= 2025 World Women's Handball Championship squads =

The following is a list of squads for each nation competing at the 2025 World Women's Handball Championship. Each team had a provisional list of 35 players. Each roster consists of 18 players, of whom 16 may be fielded for each match.

Age, club, caps and goals as of 26 November 2025.

== Group A ==
=== Croatia ===
A 19-player squad was announced on 7 November 2025. The final roster was revealed on 25 November 2025.

Head coach: Ivica Obrvan

| No. | Pos. | Name | Date of birth (age) | Height | App. | Goals | Club |
|---|---|---|---|---|---|---|---|
| 1 | GK | Lucija Bešen | 29 March 1998 (aged 27) | 1.82 m | 64 | 1 | (Croatia) RK Podravka Koprivnica |
| 3 | RW | Lara Burić | 13 August 2003 (aged 22) | 1.69 m | 32 | 42 | (Croatia) RK Lokomotiva Zagreb |
| 4 | LB | Tina Barišić | 30 October 2000 (aged 25) | 1.85 m | 30 | 86 | (Croatia) RK Podravka Koprivnica |
| 5 | CB | Iva Zrilić | 13 October 2004 (aged 21) | 1.66 m | 7 | 0 | (Croatia) RK Lokomotiva Zagreb |
| 6 | P | Sara Šenvald | 14 March 1996 (aged 29) | 1.85 m | 41 | 33 | (Croatia) RK Podravka Koprivnica |
| 10 | CB | Dejana Milosavljević | 23 November 1994 (aged 31) | 1.73 m | 55 | 140 | (Romania) HC Dunărea Brăila |
| 21 | RW | Lana Jurina | 22 June 2005 (aged 20) | 1.77 m | 0 | 0 | (Croatia) ŽRK Koka Varaždin |
| 23 | RB | Katarina Pavlović | 30 January 1995 (aged 30) | 1.80 m | 40 | 119 | (Hungary) Alba Fehérvár KC |
| 28 | LW | Andrea Šimara | 13 July 1997 (aged 28) | 1.70 m | 58 | 93 | (Croatia) RK Podravka Koprivnica |
| 29 | P | Veronika Babara | 21 June 2006 (aged 19) | 1.77 m | 2 | 2 | (Croatia) RK Podravka Koprivnica |
| 32 | CB | Ana Malec | 25 July 2000 (aged 25) | 1.74 m | 5 | 4 | (Croatia) RK Lokomotiva Zagreb |
| 36 | GK | Lea Zetović | 10 October 2004 (aged 21) | 1.81 m | 2 | 0 | (Croatia) RK Lokomotiva Zagreb |
| 40 | LB | Tena Petika | 16 June 2000 (aged 25) | 1.90 m | 32 | 43 | (Germany) SV Union Halle-Neustadt |
| 41 | P | Ema Balaško | 12 December 2004 (aged 20) | 1.76 m | 3 | 0 | (Croatia) RK Lokomotiva Zagreb |
| 44 | LW | Katja Vuković | 13 September 2006 (aged 19) | 1.71 m | 11 | 10 | (Croatia) RK Podravka Koprivnica |
| 45 | CB | Iva Bule | 14 November 2004 (aged 21) | 1.74 m | 7 | 18 | (Croatia) RK Dalmatinka Ploče |
| 48 | RB | Hannah Vuljak | 18 August 2002 (aged 23) | 1.83 m | 3 | 1 | (Croatia) RK Podravka Koprivnica |
| 88 | LB | Kristina Prkačin | 21 October 1997 (aged 28) | 1.83 m | 57 | 62 | (Croatia) RK Podravka Koprivnica |

=== Denmark ===
The squad was announced on 3 November 2025. On 19 November, Amalie Milling was added to the squad. On 21 November, Althea Reinhardt and Mette Tranborg had to withdraw from the squad due to injuries. On 23 November, Helene Kindberg and Sarah Paulsen were added to the squad.

Head coach: Helle Thomsen

| No. | Pos. | Name | Date of birth (age) | Height | App. | Goals | Club |
|---|---|---|---|---|---|---|---|
| 4 | RB | Helene Kindberg | 13 January 1998 (aged 27) | 1.79 m | 22 | 37 | (Denmark) Team Esbjerg |
| 6 | CB | Helena Elver | 1 March 1998 (aged 27) | 1.75 m | 50 | 109 | (Hungary) Győri ETO KC |
| 8 | LB | Anne Mette Hansen (c) | 25 August 1994 (aged 31) | 1.82 m | 195 | 585 | (Romania) CSM București |
| 11 | LB | Line Haugsted | 11 November 1994 (aged 31) | 1.80 m | 121 | 151 | (Denmark) Team Esbjerg |
| 12 | GK | Anna Kristensen (c) | 25 October 2000 (aged 25) | 1.84 m | 51 | 0 | (Denmark) Team Esbjerg |
| 15 | P | Sofie Bardrum | 3 April 1996 (aged 29) | 1.75 m | 5 | 14 | (Slovenia) RK Krim |
| 21 | RW | Andrea Aagot | 22 May 2000 (aged 25) | 1.78 m | 59 | 119 | (Denmark) Odense Håndbold |
| 23 | CB | Kristina Jørgensen | 17 January 1998 (aged 27) | 1.87 m | 142 | 412 | (Hungary) Győri ETO KC |
| 25 | RW | Trine Østergaard (c) | 17 October 1991 (aged 34) | 1.66 m | 212 | 435 | (Romania) CSM București |
| 28 | LB | Laura Borg | 21 February 2004 (aged 21) | 1.87 m | 9 | 3 | (Denmark) Viborg HK |
| 33 | LW | Emma Friis | 31 October 1999 (aged 26) | 1.62 m | 86 | 255 | (Romania) CSM București |
| 35 | P | Nanna Hinnerfeldt | 11 June 1999 (aged 26) | 1.72 m | 9 | 9 | (Denmark) Nykøbing Falster Håndboldklub |
| 37 | LB | Sarah Paulsen | 27 August 1997 (aged 28) | 1.74 m | 6 | 10 | (Denmark) SønderjyskE |
| 40 | GK | Amalie Milling | 27 December 1999 (aged 25) | 1.86 m | 19 | 0 | (Denmark) Ikast Håndbold |
| 41 | LW | Elma Halilcevic | 18 June 2000 (aged 25) | 1.68 m | 46 | 103 | (Denmark) Odense Håndbold |
| 42 | CB | Michala Møller | 16 February 2000 (aged 25) | 1.78 m | 53 | 108 | (Denmark) Team Esbjerg |
| 45 | LB | Julie Scaglione | 20 August 2004 (aged 21) | 1.83 m | 19 | 47 | (Denmark) Ikast Håndbold |

=== Japan ===
The squad was announced on 7 November 2025.

Head coach: (Denmark) Morten Soubak

| No. | Pos. | Name | Date of birth (age) | Height | App. | Goals | Club |
|---|---|---|---|---|---|---|---|
| 3 | P | Miyako Hatsumi | 10 September 1997 (aged 28) | 1.65 m | 36 | 64 | (Japan) Mie Violet Iris |
| 5 | RB | Arisa Kinjo | 8 December 1999 (aged 25) | 1.60 m | 10 | 28 | (South Korea) Wonderful Samcheok |
| 12 | GK | Kanako Shimoya | 15 October 1998 (aged 27) | 1.68 m | 1 | 0 | (Japan) Kumamoto Beaust Pindys |
| 13 | RB | Kaho Nakayama | 23 October 1998 (aged 27) | 1.73 m | 43 | 135 | (Germany) BSV Sachsen Zwickau |
| 17 | LB | Ayaka Ohmatsuzawa | 7 August 1997 (aged 28) | 1.73 m | 14 | 8 | (Japan) Prestige International Aranmare |
| 19 | P | Naoko Sahara | 18 January 1996 (aged 29) | 1.80 m | 31 | 44 | (Japan) Hokkoku Bank Handball Team |
| 20 | RW | Natsumi Akiyama | 23 July 1994 (aged 31) | 1.62 m | 47 | 107 | (Japan) Prestige International Aranmare |
| 23 | CB | Natsuki Aizawa | 6 January 1999 (aged 26) | 1.61 m | 41 | 183 | (Germany) Thüringer HC |
| 24 | CB | Ayama Okada | 24 May 2000 (aged 25) | 1.68 m | 30 | 76 | (Japan) Kagawa Bank |
| 29 | LW | Senri Ryu | 12 July 1999 (aged 26) | 1.69 m | 4 | 1 | (Japan) Sony Semiconductor |
| 30 | GK | Sakura Hauge | 7 January 1987 (aged 38) | 1.74 m | 79 | 8 | (Norway) Molde Elite |
| 32 | LB | Haruno Sasaki | 26 February 1995 (aged 30) | 1.72 m | 63 | 172 | (Germany) Frisch Auf Göppingen |
| 37 | LB | Minami Matsuura | 26 January 2002 (aged 23) | 1.58 m | 1 | 0 | (Japan) Kagawa Bank |
| 51 | LW | Yuki Yoshidome | 2 August 1998 (aged 27) | 1.64 m | 38 | 83 | (Japan) Hokkoku Bank Handball Team |
| 55 | P | Clare Francis Gray | 3 June 1997 (aged 28) | 1.71 m | 9 | 18 | (Japan) Kumamoto Beaust Pindys |
| 62 | LB | Mei Kawashima | 28 September 2001 (aged 24) | 1.70 m | 0 | 0 | (Japan) Sony Semiconductor |
| 77 | GK | Aki Ueshima | 5 July 2001 (aged 24) | 1.76 m | 0 | 0 | (France) ASUL Vaulx-en-Velin |
| 89 | RB | Sora Ishikawa | 20 December 2002 (aged 22) | 1.70 m | 31 | 71 | (Norway) Molde Elite |

=== Romania ===
The squad was announced on 7 November 2025.

Head coach: Ovidiu Mihai Mihăilă

| No. | Pos. | Name | Date of birth (age) | Height | App. | Goals | Club |
|---|---|---|---|---|---|---|---|
| 1 | GK | Bianca Curmenț | 12 June 1997 (aged 28) | 1.82 m | 13 | 0 | (Romania) CSM Corona Brașov |
| 2 | RW | Mihaela Mihai | 15 December 2004 (aged 20) | 1.77 m | 6 | 4 | (Romania) CSM București |
| 6 | P | Asma Elghaoui | 29 August 1991 (aged 34) | 1.74 m | 2 | 4 | (Romania) SCM Râmnicu Vâlcea |
| 13 | CB | Cristina Laslo | 10 April 1996 (aged 29) | 1.77 m | 85 | 153 | (Romania) Gloria Bistrița |
| 17 | CB | Rebeca Necula | 17 May 2003 (aged 22) | 1.67 m | 12 | 11 | (Romania) SCM Râmnicu Vâlcea |
| 19 | LB | Maryia Skrobic | 19 March 1997 (aged 28) | 1.88 m | 0 | 0 | (Romania) Rapid București |
| 20 | P | Sonia Vasiliu | 11 January 1996 (aged 29) | 1.82 m | 0 | 0 | (Romania) CSM Slatina |
| 24 | CB | Alisia Boicuic | 20 July 2005 (aged 20) | 1.77 m | 11 | 20 | (Romania) CSM Corona Brașov |
| 27 | P | Lorena Ostase | 25 July 1997 (aged 28) | 1.79 m | 53 | 149 | (Romania) Gloria Bistrița |
| 29 | LW | Alexandra Dumitrascu | 4 September 2002 (aged 23) | 1.72 m | 2 | 1 | (Romania) CSM Corona Brașov |
| 30 | RW | Sonia Seraficeanu | 25 July 1997 (aged 28) | 1.76 m | 54 | 114 | (Romania) Gloria Bistrița |
| 42 | CB | Elena Rosu | 24 March 1997 (aged 28) | 1.75 m | 9 | 7 | (Romania) HC Dunărea Brăila |
| 44 | LW | Éva Kerekes | 7 April 2001 (aged 24) | 1.77 m | 3 | 4 | (Romania) Gloria Bistrița |
| 53 | GK | Iulia Dumanska | 15 August 1996 (aged 29) | 1.76 m | 72 | 0 | (Romania) CS Minaur Baia Mare |
| 70 | CB | Andreea Popa | 3 June 2000 (aged 25) | 1.75 m | 27 | 49 | (Romania) HC Dunărea Brăila |
| 71 | RB | Alicia Gogîrlă | 17 January 2003 (aged 22) | 1.82 m | 17 | 21 | (Romania) SCM Craiova |
| 94 | GK | Elena Șerban | 15 October 1994 (aged 31) | 1.82 m | 2 | 0 | (Romania) HC Dunărea Brăila |
| 99 | LB | Sorina Grozav | 27 May 1999 (aged 26) | 1.75 m | 21 | 34 | (Romania) CSM Corona Brașov |

== Group B ==
=== Hungary ===
The squad was announced on 4 November 2025. On 18 November, Júlia Hársfalvi replaced Csenge Fodor in the squad due to an injury. On 24 November Laura Falusi-Udvardi replaced Anett Kovács in the squad due to an injury.

Head coach: Vladimir Golovin

| No. | Pos. | Name | Date of birth (age) | Height | App. | Goals | Club |
|---|---|---|---|---|---|---|---|
| 4 | P | Petra Füzi-Tóvizi | 15 March 1999 (aged 26) | 1.78 m | 101 | 123 | (Hungary) Debreceni VSC |
| 5 | LB | Luca Csíkos | 25 February 2005 (aged 20) | 1.79 m | 6 | 10 | (Hungary) Váci NKSE |
| 9 | LW | Júlia Hársfalvi | 12 November 1996 (aged 29) | 1.68 m | 10 | 18 | (Hungary) Ferencvárosi TC |
| 10 | LB | Lea Faragó | 22 July 2005 (aged 20) | 1.75 m | 5 | 12 | (Hungary) Esztergomi KC |
| 11 | RB | Anna Albek | 2 December 2001 (aged 23) | 1.89 m | 42 | 49 | (France) Metz Handball |
| 17 | RW | Laura Falusi-Udvardi | 17 July 1997 (aged 28) | 1.65 m | 0 | 0 | (Hungary) Mosonmagyaróvári KC SE |
| 18 | RW | Anett Kovács | 12 November 1994 (aged 31) | 1.68 m | 18 | 37 | (Hungary) Esztergomi KC |
| 19 | LW | Gréta Márton | 3 October 1999 (aged 26) | 1.73 m | 105 | 240 | (Hungary) Ferencvárosi TC |
| 20 | P | Apollónia Szmolek | 8 August 2002 (aged 23) | 1.87 m | 5 | 2 | (Hungary) Esztergomi KC |
| 28 | RB | Nikoletta Papp | 23 July 1996 (aged 29) | 1.82 m | 73 | 79 | (Romania) Minaur Baia Mare |
| 31 | GK | Zsófi Szemerey | 2 June 1994 (aged 31) | 1.83 m | 43 | 1 | (Hungary) Győri ETO KC |
| 38 | CB | Petra Vámos | 14 September 2000 (aged 25) | 1.75 m | 95 | 254 | (France) Metz Handball |
| 42 | RB | Katrin Klujber | 21 April 1999 (aged 26) | 1.70 m | 101 | 547 | (Hungary) Ferencvárosi TC |
| 58 | P | Réka Bordás | 26 August 1997 (aged 28) | 1.85 m | 77 | 60 | (Hungary) Ferencvárosi TC |
| 59 | LB | Csenge Kuczora | 26 January 2000 (aged 25) | 1.76 m | 65 | 225 | (Germany) Thüringer HC |
| 61 | GK | Kinga Janurik | 6 November 1991 (aged 34) | 1.76 m | 78 | 1 | (Hungary) Ferencvárosi TC |
| 74 | GK | Anna Bukovszky | 30 June 2002 (aged 23) | 1.75 m | 11 | 0 | (Hungary) Esztergomi KC |
| 77 | CB | Petra Simon | 12 November 2004 (aged 21) | 1.68 m | 44 | 132 | (Hungary) Ferencvárosi TC |
| 88 | RW | Vivien Grosch | 17 April 1997 (aged 28) | 1.65 m | 5 | 8 | (Hungary) Debreceni VSC |

=== Iran ===
Head coach: (Portugal) Ana Teixeira

| No. | Pos. | Name | Date of birth (age) | Height | App. | Goals | Club |
|---|---|---|---|---|---|---|---|
| 4 | LB | Fatemeh Merikh | 6 August 2004 (aged 21) | 1.70 m | 21 | 35 | (Iran) Foolad Sepahan Isfahan |
| 8 | RW | Haniyeh Karimi | 2 May 2003 (aged 22) | 1.73 m | 6 | 2 | (Iran) Perspolis Behbahan |
| 9 | RB | Setareh Rahmanian | 19 November 1994 (aged 31) | 1.78 m | 7 | 4 | (Iran) Naft E Gaz Gachsaran |
| 10 | P | Atieh Shahsavari | 16 January 2000 (aged 25) | 1.80 m | 133 | 67 | (Iran) Foolad Sepahan Isfahan |
| 12 | GK | Fatemeh Khalili | 30 June 1996 (aged 29) | 1.75 m | 47 | 0 | (Iran) Foolad Sepahan Isfahan |
| 17 | CB | Mina Vatanparast | 10 December 1989 (aged 35) | 1.67 m | 43 | 115 | (Iran) Sang Ahan Bafaq |
| 19 | LW | Hadiseh Norouzi | 10 November 1998 (aged 27) | 1.72 m | 63 | 41 | (Iran) Foolad Sepahan Isfahan |
| 20 | LW | Bahar Eizadgashb | 2 July 2000 (aged 25) | 1.64 m | 25 | 34 | (Iran) Foolad Hormozgan Club |
| 22 | GK | Zahra Afshari | 20 February 2007 (aged 18) | 1.81 m | 0 | 0 | (Iran) Naft E Gaz Gachsaran |
| 23 | P | Leila Hosseini | 2 December 2003 (aged 21) | 1.73 m | 7 | 3 | (Iran) Naft E Gaz Gachsaran |
| 24 | CB | Aseman Badvi | 24 February 2007 (aged 18) | 1.75 m | 17 | 28 | (Iran) Sang Ahan Bafaq |
| 25 | LB | Hedieh Hafez | 27 October 1999 (aged 26) | 1.70 m | 0 | 0 | (Iran) Foolad Sepahan Isfahan |
| 27 | LB | Arezou Kianiara | 25 January 1994 (aged 31) | 1.73 m | 75 | 55 | (Iran) Sang Ahan Bafgh |
| 76 | LB | Nastaran Koudzarifarahani | 10 January 2004 (aged 21) | 1.75 m | 8 | 33 | (Iran) Foolad Sepahan Isfahan |
| 96 | RW | Sanaz Rajabi | 15 October 1991 (aged 34) | 1.65 m | 106 | 156 | (Iran) Sang Ahan Bafgh |
| 99 | LB | Mozhgan Ghahremani | 6 August 1991 (aged 34) | 1.78 m | 170 | 150 | (Iran) Eshtad Sazeh Mashhad |

=== Senegal ===
Head coach: Yacine Messaoudi

| No. | Pos. | Name | Date of birth (age) | Height | App. | Goals | Club |
|---|---|---|---|---|---|---|---|
| 10 | LW | Aminata Cissokho | 1 June 2001 (aged 24) | 1.75 m | 6 | 14 | (France) Paris 92 |
| 12 | GK | Fatima Camara | 7 December 2004 (aged 20) | 1.78 m | 0 | 0 | (France) Palente Besançon Handball |
| 15 | P | Hawa N'Diaye | 24 July 1995 (aged 30) | 1.76 m | 28 | 91 | (Romania) SCM Gloria Buzău |
| 16 | GK | Justicia Toubissa | 16 July 2001 (aged 24) | 1.73 m | 21 | 0 | (France) Sambre-Avesnois Handball |
| 17 | RW | Honorine Da Sylva | 31 January 2006 (aged 19) | 1.67 m | 0 | 0 | (France) ASUL Vaulx-en-Velin Handball |
| 21 | LW | Mathita Diawara | 21 January 2003 (aged 22) | 1.75 m | 6 | 2 | (France) OGC Nice |
| 23 | P | Maiwenn Dasylva | 30 October 2002 (aged 23) | 1.85 m | 6 | 2 | (France) Rouen Handball |
| 24 | LB | Dounia Abdourahim | 17 January 1992 (aged 33) | 1.82 m | 0 | 0 | (France) Le Havre AC |
| 27 | LW | Dienaba Sy | 27 June 1995 (aged 30) | 1.69 m | 17 | 21 | (France) OGC Nice |
| 29 | LB | Gnonsiane Niombla | 9 July 1990 (aged 35) | 1.72 m | 0 | 0 | (Romania) Viitorul Cluj-Napoca |
| 31 | P | Marie Fall | 2 April 1998 (aged 27) | 1.85 m | 6 | 12 | (France) OGC Nice |
| 42 | LB | Astou N'Diaye | 23 April 2000 (aged 25) | 1.68 m | 6 | 6 | (Tunisia) Club Africain |
| 44 | RW | Raïssa Dapina | 27 September 1995 (aged 30) | 1.75 m | 28 | 65 | (France) OGC Nice |
| 55 | LB | Soda Cissé | 4 March 1998 (aged 27) | 1.76 m | 6 | 8 | (Tunisia) AS Téboulba |
| 77 | CB | Sophie Kebe | 29 July 2001 (aged 24) | 1.70 m | 12 | 35 | (France) Palente Besançon Handball |
| 92 | LB | Coura Camara | 1 March 1999 (aged 26) | 1.80 m | 0 | 0 | (France) Cesson Rennes MHB |
| 99 | GK | Ndeye Sene | 12 February 1997 (aged 28) | 1.90 m | 6 | 0 | (France) Golf Handball Club |

=== Switzerland ===
A 19-player squad was announced on 5 November 2025.

Head coach: (Norway) Knut Ove Joa

| No. | Pos. | Name | Date of birth (age) | Height | App. | Goals | Club |
|---|---|---|---|---|---|---|---|
| 1 | GK | Lea Schüpbach | 10 September 1997 (aged 28) | 1.79 m | 60 | 0 | (France) Handball Plan-de-Cuques |
| 3 | CB | Kerstin Kündig | 2 July 1993 (aged 32) | 1.75 m | 105 | 275 | (Switzerland) GC Amicitia Zürich |
| 4 | CB | Laurentia Wolff | 19 August 2003 (aged 22) | 1.77 m | 27 | 8 | (Germany) VfL Oldenburg |
| 7 | P | Tabea Schmid | 14 August 2003 (aged 22) | 1.81 m | 49 | 251 | (Denmark) Team Esbjerg |
| 8 | RW | Mia Emmenegger | 17 January 2005 (aged 20) | 1.61 m | 45 | 222 | (Denmark) Team Esbjerg |
| 10 | LB | Daphne Gautschi | 9 July 2000 (aged 25) | 1.72 m | 67 | 250 | (Romania) SCM Râmnicu Vâlcea |
| 11 | LB | Clairebel Coker | 21 February 2005 (aged 20) | 1.77 m | 1 | 1 | (Switzerland) LC Brühl Handball |
| 13 | LW | Era Baumann | 10 April 2007 (aged 18) | 1.67 m | 21 | 30 | (Denmark) Viborg HK |
| 14 | CB | Nuria Bucher | 21 March 2005 (aged 20) | 1.79 m | 34 | 64 | (Germany) HSG Blomberg-Lippe |
| 15 | LB | Norma Goldmann | 6 October 2003 (aged 22) | 1.75 m | 33 | 29 | (Germany) Bergischer HC |
| 17 | LB | Charlotte Kähr | 27 June 2001 (aged 24) | 1.75 m | 61 | 63 | (Germany) BSV Sachsen Zwickau |
| 18 | LW | Melanie Felber | 14 February 1991 (aged 34) | 1.67 m | 14 | 19 | (Sweden) Skara HF |
| 21 | RB | Malin Altherr | 14 February 2003 (aged 22) | 1.79 m | 47 | 65 | (Switzerland) LC Brühl Handball |
| 30 | GK | Claire Hartz | 2 September 2005 (aged 20) | 1.81 m | 6 | 0 | (Switzerland) Spono Eagles |
| 32 | GK | Seraina Kuratli | 18 April 2007 (aged 18) | 1.76 m | 11 | 1 | (Switzerland) GC Amicitia Zürich |
| 33 | P | Nora Snedkerud | 21 January 2005 (aged 20) | 1.80 m | 18 | 9 | (France) Achenheim Truchtersheim Handball |
| 35 | RW | Louise Truchot | 12 January 2003 (aged 22) | 1.64 m | 1 | 1 | (Switzerland) LC Brühl Handball |
| 44 | P | Joline Erni | 18 April 2006 (aged 19) | 1.75 m | 1 | 0 | (Switzerland) GC Amicitia Zürich |

== Group C ==
=== Germany ===
The squad was announced on 4 November 2025.

Head coach: Markus Gaugisch

| No. | Pos. | Name | Date of birth (age) | Height | App. | Goals | Club |
|---|---|---|---|---|---|---|---|
| 4 | CB | Alina Grijseels | 12 April 1996 (aged 29) | 1.75 m | 112 | 393 | (Germany) Borussia Dortmund |
| 8 | RB | Nina Engel | 25 April 2003 (aged 22) | 1.76 m | 17 | 50 | (Germany) HSG Bensheim/Auerbach |
| 9 | P | Lisa Antl | 21 June 2000 (aged 25) | 1.72 m | 72 | 110 | (Germany) Borussia Dortmund |
| 10 | CB | Mareike Thomaier | 25 August 2000 (aged 25) | 1.72 m | 46 | 48 | (Germany) HSG Bensheim/Auerbach |
| 11 | LB | Xenia Smits | 22 April 1994 (aged 31) | 1.85 m | 145 | 344 | (France) Metz Handball |
| 14 | P | Marie Steffen | 2 March 2001 (aged 24) | 1.83 m | 7 | 1 | (Germany) VfL Oldenburg |
| 19 | LB | Nieke Kühne | 9 September 2004 (aged 21) | 1.84 m | 10 | 13 | (Germany) HSG Blomberg-Lippe |
| 20 | LB | Emily Vogel | 26 April 1998 (aged 27) | 1.82 m | 138 | 413 | (Hungary) Ferencvárosi TC |
| 23 | LB | Annika Lott | 7 December 1999 (aged 25) | 1.80 m | 46 | 88 | (France) Brest Bretagne Handball |
| 24 | GK | Sarah Wachter | 16 December 1999 (aged 25) | 1.83 m | 48 | 2 | (Germany) Borussia Dortmund |
| 27 | RB | Julia Maidhof | 13 March 1998 (aged 27) | 1.76 m | 75 | 231 | (Romania) Râmnicu Vâlcea |
| 29 | LW | Antje Döll | 3 October 1988 (aged 37) | 1.70 m | 105 | 273 | (Germany) Sport-Union Neckarsulm |
| 30 | RW | Jenny Behrend | 20 January 1996 (aged 29) | 1.72 m | 85 | 165 | (Germany) VfL Oldenburg |
| 31 | LW | Alexia Hauf | 18 July 1998 (aged 27) | 1.62 m | 32 | 68 | (Germany) HSG Blomberg-Lippe |
| 42 | GK | Katharina Filter | 4 February 1999 (aged 26) | 1.80 m | 74 | 2 | (Denmark) Team Esbjerg |
| 45 | LW | Jolina Huhnstock | 4 May 2001 (aged 24) | 1.80 m | 15 | 11 | (Germany) Buxtehuder SV |
| 49 | LB | Aimée von Pereira | 16 February 2000 (aged 25) | 1.83 m | 6 | 4 | (Denmark) København Håndbold |
| 61 | GK | Nicole Roth | 8 May 1995 (aged 30) | 1.82 m | 7 | 0 | (Germany) HSG Blomberg-Lippe |
| 77 | RB | Viola Leuchter | 15 June 2004 (aged 21) | 1.87 m | 39 | 94 | (Denmark) Odense Håndbold |

=== Iceland ===
The squad was announced on 7 November 2025.

Head coach: Arnar Pétursson

| No. | Pos. | Name | Date of birth (age) | Height | App. | Goals | Club |
|---|---|---|---|---|---|---|---|
| 3 | LB | Andrea Jacobsen | 9 April 1998 (aged 27) | 1.81 m | 66 | 116 | (Germany) HSG Blomberg-Lippe |
| 6 | RW | Þórey Anna Ásgeirsdóttir | 3 November 1997 (aged 28) | 1.71 m | 47 | 68 | (Iceland) Valur |
| 7 | RW | Díana Dögg Magnúsdóttir | 19 September 1997 (aged 28) | 1.75 m | 65 | 88 | (Germany) HSG Blomberg-Lippe |
| 12 | GK | Hafdís Renötudóttir | 12 July 1997 (aged 28) | 1.93 m | 70 | 4 | (Iceland) Valur |
| 14 | P | Elísa Elíasdóttir | 31 July 2004 (aged 21) | 1.76 m | 24 | 19 | (Iceland) ÍBV |
| 17 | CB | Elín Klara Þorkelsdóttir | 14 September 2004 (aged 21) | 1.69 m | 26 | 90 | (Sweden) IK Sävehof |
| 19 | CB | Lovisa Thompson | 27 October 1999 (aged 26) | 1.72 m | 30 | 66 | (Iceland) Valur |
| 20 | GK | Sara Sif Helgadóttir | 8 June 2000 (aged 25) | 1.71 m | 14 | 0 | (Iceland) Valur |
| 21 | CB | Sandra Erlingsdóttir | 27 July 1998 (aged 27) | 1.60 m | 38 | 155 | (Iceland) ÍBV |
| 22 | CB | Elín Rósa Magnúsdóttir | 22 October 2002 (aged 23) | 1.67 m | 31 | 59 | (Germany) HSG Blomberg-Lippe |
| 23 | LW | Dana Björg Guðmundsdóttir | 1 June 2002 (aged 23) | 1.70 m | 12 | 25 | (Norway) Volda |
| 24 | RW | Katrín Anna Ásmundsdóttir | 4 July 2004 (aged 21) | 1.70 m | 12 | 25 | (Iceland) Fram |
| 25 | RB | Thea Imani Sturludóttir | 21 January 1997 (aged 28) | 1.79 m | 91 | 197 | (Iceland) Valur |
| 33 | P | Katrín Tinna Jensdóttir | 31 July 2002 (aged 23) | 1.81 m | 27 | 17 | (Iceland) ÍR |
| 34 | LB | Alfa Brá Oddsdóttir Hagalín | 27 April 2005 (aged 20) | 1.80 m | 9 | 8 | (Iceland) Fram |
| 35 | P | Alexandra Líf Arnarsdóttir | 22 October 2000 (aged 25) | 1.76 m | 0 | 0 | (Iceland) Haukar Handball |
| 37 | LW | Rakel Oddný Guðmundsdóttir | 26 June 2004 (aged 21) | 1.68 m | 3 | 2 | (Iceland) Haukar Handball |
| 43 | CB | Matthildur Lilja Jónsdóttir | 13 September 2004 (aged 21) | 1.76 m | 0 | 0 | (Iceland) ÍR |

=== Serbia ===
The squad was announced on 5 November 2025.

Head coach: (Spain) José Ignacio Prades

| No. | Pos. | Name | Date of birth (age) | Height | App. | Goals | Club |
|---|---|---|---|---|---|---|---|
| 1 | GK | Marijana Ilić | 19 August 1996 (aged 29) | 1.84 m | 3 | 0 | (Germany) SV Union Halle-Neustadt |
| 2 | LW | Sanja Radosavljević | 15 January 1994 (aged 31) | 1.72 m | 103 | 286 | (Poland) MKS Lublin |
| 3 | RW | Katarina Krpež Šlezak | 2 May 1988 (aged 37) | 1.67 m | 164 | 413 | (Romania) CSM Corona Brașov |
| 5 | LB | Emilija Lazić | 4 August 2000 (aged 25) | 1.78 m | 25 | 47 | (Hungary) Alba Fehérvár KC |
| 8 | CB | Tamara Mandić | 28 August 2005 (aged 20) | 1.75 m | 5 | 5 | (Serbia) ŽRK Medicinar |
| 9 | LB | Dunja Tabak | 29 June 2001 (aged 24) | 1.79 m | 12 | 12 | (Croatia) RK Lokomotiva Zagreb |
| 13 | P | Jelena Agbaba | 20 June 1997 (aged 28) | 1.83 m | 34 | 43 | (Serbia) ŽRK Crvena zvezda |
| 15 | RB | Anđela Janjušević | 18 June 1995 (aged 30) | 1.81 m | 74 | 197 | (Romania) HC Dunărea Brăila |
| 16 | GK | Jovana Risović | 7 October 1993 (aged 32) | 1.71 m | 86 | 5 | (Serbia) ŽRK Naisa |
| 19 | P | Vladana Mitrović | 25 May 2004 (aged 21) | 1.80 m | 2 | 3 | (Serbia) ŽORK Jagodina |
| 21 | LW | Tamara Kocić | 17 July 2003 (aged 22) | 1.79 m | 16 | 11 | (Serbia) RK Ruma |
| 22 | LB | Jovana Jovović | 4 December 2001 (aged 23) | 1.81 m | 38 | 129 | (Hungary) Debreceni VSC |
| 24 | LB | Jovana Skrobić | 9 April 1996 (aged 29) | 1.81 m | 30 | 84 | (Serbia) ŽRK Crvena zvezda |
| 27 | GK | Gordana Petković | 24 March 1991 (aged 34) | 1.78 m | 0 | 0 | (Serbia) ŽRK Crvena zvezda |
| 33 | LB | Teodora Veličković | 28 April 2001 (aged 24) | 1.75 m | 29 | 32 | (Serbia) ŽRK Crvena zvezda |
| 34 | RW | Dunja Radević | 25 November 2005 (aged 20) | 1.69 m | 21 | 39 | (Montenegro) ŽRK Budućnost Podgorica |
| 72 | P | Dragana Cvijić | 15 March 1990 (aged 35) | 1.83 m | 110 | 333 | (Hungary) Ferencvárosi TC |
| 77 | CB | Aleksandra Vukajlović | 7 June 1997 (aged 28) | 1.71 m | 47 | 65 | (Romania) CSM Slatina |
| 94 | RB | Sara Garović | 22 August 1994 (aged 31) | 1.75 m | 4 | 11 | (Serbia) ŽRK Crvena zvezda |

=== Uruguay ===
The squad was announced on 23 November 2025.

Head coach: Leonardo Puñales

| No. | Pos. | Name | Date of birth (age) | Height | App. | Goals | Club |
|---|---|---|---|---|---|---|---|
| 2 | P | Julieta Pessina | 19 September 1999 (aged 26) | 1.69 m | 40 | 15 | (Uruguay) Layva Balonmano |
| 3 | LB | Sabrina Grieco | 12 May 1999 (aged 26) | 1.73 m | 60 | 200 | (Uruguay) Club Atlético Goes |
| 4 | CB | Martina Barreiro | 24 October 1996 (aged 29) | 1.65 m | 102 | 452 | (Uruguay) Club Atlético Goes |
| 5 | RB | Camila Barreiro | 29 January 1994 (aged 31) | 1.60 m | 28 | 54 | (Uruguay) Club Atlético Goes |
| 6 | LW | Leticia Schinca | 12 April 1990 (aged 35) | 1.69 m | 60 | 180 | (Uruguay) Club Nautico |
| 7 | RW | Catalina Tournier | 4 December 2001 (aged 23) | 1.63 m | 120 | 90 | (Uruguay) Colegio Alemán |
| 8 | LB | Camila Bianco | 9 March 1998 (aged 27) | 1.76 m | 40 | 60 | (Uruguay) Layva Balonmano |
| 9 | P | Rosina González | 22 June 1993 (aged 32) | 1.73 m | 40 | 55 | (Uruguay) Layva Balonmano |
| 10 | P | Viviana Ferrari | 25 March 1992 (aged 33) | 1.71 m | 190 | 450 | (Uruguay) Club Atlético Goes |
| 12 | GK | Viviana Hergatacorzian | 3 August 2001 (aged 24) | 1.78 m | 25 | 1 | (Uruguay) Club Atlético Goes |
| 13 | CB | Maite Pessina | 4 December 2001 (aged 23) | 1.71 m | 20 | 25 | (Uruguay) Layva Balonmano |
| 18 | RB | Sabrina Golda | 31 May 2003 (aged 22) | 1.64 m | 40 | 100 | (Uruguay) Club Nautico |
| 19 | RB | Magdalena Guichon | 12 May 2004 (aged 21) | 1.69 m | 30 | 60 | (Uruguay) Scuola Italiana Di Montevideo |
| 22 | GK | Agustina Modernell | 22 October 1995 (aged 30) | 1.74 m | 94 | 1 | (Uruguay) Layva Balonmano |
| 24 | LB | Martina Campos | 25 December 2005 (aged 19) | 1.67 m | 32 | 130 | (Uruguay) Sesi Araraquara |
| 27 | CB | Paula Eastman | 5 May 1997 (aged 28) | 1.57 m | 70 | 150 | (Uruguay) Layva Balonmano |

== Group D ==
=== Faroe Islands ===
The squad was announced on 3 November 2025.

Head coach: (Denmark) Claus Mogensen

| No. | Pos. | Name | Date of birth (age) | Height | App. | Goals | Club |
|---|---|---|---|---|---|---|---|
| 1 | GK | Annika Fríðheim Petersen | 1 June 1999 (aged 26) | 1.79 m | 33 | 1 | (Denmark) EH Aalborg |
| 2 | RB | Elsa Egholm | 21 June 2003 (aged 22) | 1.77 m | 24 | 25 | (Denmark) Ajax København |
| 3 | LB | Marianna Geirsdóttir Eystberg | 27 February 1998 (aged 27) | 1.80 m | 22 | 76 | (Denmark) BK Ydun |
| 5 | P | Var Bentsdóttir Zachariasen | 11 April 2002 (aged 23) | 1.80 m | 9 | 4 | (Denmark) Ajax København |
| 6 | LB | Marita Mortensen | 29 March 2001 (aged 24) | 1.80 m | 20 | 20 | (Denmark) HØJ Elite |
| 7 | P | Bjarta Osberg Johansen | 28 April 1993 (aged 32) | 1.71 m | 44 | 39 | (Faroe Islands) Kyndil |
| 8 | LW | Rannvá Olsen | 22 January 2003 (aged 22) | 1.70 m | 20 | 31 | (Denmark) Ejstrup/Hærvejen |
| 10 | CB | Súna Krossteig Hansen | 29 March 2000 (aged 25) | 1.72 m | 37 | 82 | (Denmark) Skanderborg Håndbold |
| 16 | GK | Gylta á Neystabø | 13 December 2006 (aged 18) | 1.75 m | 0 | 0 | (Faroe Islands) Kyndil |
| 17 | LB | Lív Bentsdóttir Zachariasen | 11 April 2002 (aged 23) | 1.79 m | 16 | 8 | (Denmark) Ajax København |
| 18 | P | Pernille Brandenborg (c) | 29 June 1997 (aged 28) | 1.82 m | 48 | 92 | (Norway) Storhamar HE |
| 21 | CB | Maria Pálsdóttir Nólsoy | 19 August 2004 (aged 21) | 1.77 m | 20 | 55 | (Denmark) HH Elite |
| 23 | RW | Lív Sveinbjørnsdóttir Poulsen | 27 December 2001 (aged 23) | 1.74 m | 33 | 66 | (Faroe Islands) VÍF |
| 28 | RW | Karin Egholm | 28 July 2005 (aged 20) | 1.69 m | 7 | 10 | (Faroe Islands) H71 |
| 44 | LW | Anna Elisabeth Halsdóttir Weyhe | 30 October 2005 (aged 20) | 1.69 m | 12 | 34 | (Faroe Islands) H71 |
| 47 | CB | Maria Halsdóttir Weyhe | 5 August 2000 (aged 25) | 1.71 m | 23 | 55 | (Faroe Islands) H71 |
| 77 | CB | Jana Mittún | 24 November 2003 (aged 22) | 1.76 m | 27 | 122 | (Denmark) Viborg HK |
| 88 | GK | Rakul Wardum | 12 June 2002 (aged 23) | 1.78 m | 27 | 2 | (Denmark) Ringkøbing Håndbold |

=== Montenegro ===
A 23-player squad was announced on 10 November 2025. The final squad was announced on 24 November 2025.

Head coach: Suzana Lazović

| No. | Pos. | Name | Date of birth (age) | Height | App. | Goals | Club |
|---|---|---|---|---|---|---|---|
| 1 | GK | Andrea Škerović | 10 April 2004 (aged 21) | 1.81 m | 0 | 0 | (Montenegro) ŽRK Budućnost |
| 2 | RW | Anastasija Marsenić | 24 February 2003 (aged 22) | 1.72 m | 23 | 38 | (Denmark) København Håndbold |
| 6 | LB | Elena Mitrović | 22 December 2006 (aged 18) | 1.87 m | 17 | 55 | (Montenegro) ŽRK Budućnost |
| 9 | LB | Đurđina Jauković (c) | 24 February 1997 (aged 28) | 1.85 m | 101 | 302 | (Romania) CSM București |
| 10 | CB | Matea Pletikosić | 24 April 1998 (aged 27) | 1.68 m | 69 | 105 | (Croatia) RK Podravka Koprivnica |
| 11 | P | Ivana Godeč | 11 May 2001 (aged 24) | 1.82 m | 36 | 20 | (Montenegro) ŽRK Budućnost |
| 12 | GK | Armelle Attingré | 15 January 1989 (aged 36) | 1.85 m | 14 | 1 | (Montenegro) ŽRK Budućnost |
| 13 | LW | Dijana Trivić | 22 October 1995 (aged 30) | 1.72 m | 63 | 149 | (Romania) CSM Corona Brașov |
| 14 | RB | Katarina Džaferović | 14 July 2002 (aged 23) | 1.85 m | 31 | 4 | (Hungary) Mosonmagyaróvári KC SE |
| 15 | RB | Jelena Vukčević | 11 December 2004 (aged 20) | 1.70 m | 17 | 22 | (Montenegro) ŽRK Budućnost |
| 18 | GK | Marija Marsenić | 6 May 2004 (aged 21) | 1.79 m | 2 | 0 | (Montenegro) ŽRK Budućnost |
| 28 | CB | Marija Božović | 21 November 2000 (aged 25) | 1.78 m | 2 | 2 | (Czech Republic) Házená Kynžvart |
| 34 | P | Tatjana Brnović | 9 November 1998 (aged 27) | 1.84 m | 91 | 180 | (Romania) CSM București |
| 37 | RW | Nina Bulatović | 9 December 1996 (aged 28) | 1.72 m | 53 | 58 | (Montenegro) ŽRK Budućnost |
| 55 | P | Andrijana Tatar | 10 December 1995 (aged 29) | 1.79 m | 11 | 9 | (Hungary) Mosonmagyaróvári KC SE |
| 91 | LW | Ivona Pavićević | 21 April 1996 (aged 29) | 1.67 m | 105 | 151 | (Romania) SCM Craiova |
| 96 | CB | Itana Grbić | 1 September 1996 (aged 29) | 1.69 m | 115 | 180 | (Montenegro) ŽRK Budućnost |

=== Paraguay ===
Head coach: Marizza Faría

| No. | Pos. | Name | Date of birth (age) | Height | App. | Goals | Club |
|---|---|---|---|---|---|---|---|
| 2 | LW | Fátima Acuña | 14 August 1999 (aged 26) | 1.78 m | 122 | 187 | (Spain) Club Adesal Córdoba |
| 4 | RB | Fernanda Insfrán | 7 February 1998 (aged 27) | 1.58 m | 115 | 407 | (Spain) CB Sporting La Rioja |
| 6 | P | Sabrina Fiore | 17 April 1996 (aged 29) | 1.76 m | 122 | 100 | (North Macedonia) WHC Chair |
| 10 | P | Gisela González | 16 April 1997 (aged 28) | 1.71 m | 75 | 83 | (Spain) BM Gijón |
| 11 | CB | Delyne Leiva | 27 March 1998 (aged 27) | 1.59 m | 115 | 155 | (Spain) Lanzarote Puerto del Carmen |
| 12 | GK | Fátima Ocampos | 3 January 2003 (aged 22) | 1.80 m | 52 | 12 | (Italy) Ariosto 2023 |
| 14 | LB | María Paula Fernández | 30 August 1998 (aged 27) | 1.54 m | 115 | 214 | (Spain) CB Zonzamas |
| 16 | LB | Jessica Fleitas | 22 August 1997 (aged 28) | 1.63 m | 100 | 104 | (Paraguay) Club Juventud Ypanense |
| 18 | P | Maggie Lugo | 8 April 1994 (aged 31) | 1.73 m | 52 | 39 | (Paraguay) Club Deportivo Internacional |
| 24 | LW | Ariana Portillo | 17 August 2001 (aged 24) | 1.66 m | 77 | 97 | (Spain) CB Atlético Guardés |
| 25 | GK | María Machucha | 23 October 1994 (aged 31) | 1.76 m | 115 | 12 | (Spain) CB Caniza |
| 26 | RW | Jazmín Mendoza | 27 May 2002 (aged 23) | 1.64 m | 60 | 95 | (Spain) CB Atlético Guardés |
| 27 | LW | Brenda Torres | 26 October 2002 (aged 23) | 1.62 m | 4 | 2 | (Spain) Lanzarote Puerto del Carmen |
| 28 | LB | Milagros Samaniego | 18 March 2006 (aged 19) | 1.78 m | 27 | 15 | (Paraguay) Cerro Porteño |
| 35 | CB | Fiorella Enríquez | 20 April 2006 (aged 19) | 1.63 m | 7 | 0 | (Paraguay) Club Deportivo Internacional |
| 39 | RW | Valheria Valdovinos | 4 September 2001 (aged 24) | 1.63 m | 0 | 0 | (Paraguay) Cerro Porteño |

=== Spain ===
The squad was announced on 5 November 2025.

Head coach: Ambros Martín

| No. | Pos. | Name | Date of birth (age) | Height | App. | Goals | Club |
|---|---|---|---|---|---|---|---|
| 1 | GK | Nicole Wiggins | 9 August 2000 (aged 25) | 1.78 m | 46 | 3 | (Spain) BM Bera Bera |
| 14 | LW | Ona Vegué | 9 July 1998 (aged 27) | 1.69 m | 29 | 81 | (Germany) HSG Blomberg-Lippe |
| 17 | LW | Jennifer Gutiérrez Bermejo | 20 May 1995 (aged 30) | 1.69 m | 120 | 297 | (Romania) CS Gloria Bistrița |
| 18 | RW | Maitane Etxeberria | 15 January 1997 (aged 28) | 1.69 m | 102 | 185 | (Spain) BM Bera Bera |
| 19 | LB | Ester Somaza | 3 June 2004 (aged 21) | 1.78 m | 26 | 47 | (Spain) BM Bera Bera |
| 23 | RB | Paula Arcos | 21 December 2001 (aged 23) | 1.68 m | 79 | 190 | (Romania) CS Gloria Bistrița |
| 24 | P | Lysa Tchaptchet | 20 December 2001 (aged 23) | 1.86 m | 61 | 78 | (Denmark) Odense Håndbold |
| 27 | LB | Danila So Delgado | 19 September 2001 (aged 24) | 1.73 m | 36 | 108 | (Romania) CS Gloria Bistrița |
| 33 | P | Kaba Gassama | 16 August 1997 (aged 28) | 1.84 m | 85 | 125 | (Romania) CS Gloria Bistrița |
| 34 | CB | Alicia Fernández | 21 December 1992 (aged 32) | 1.73 m | 115 | 267 | (Poland) MKS Zagłębie Lubin |
| 65 | RW | Anne Erauskin | 7 November 1998 (aged 27) | 1.71 m | 18 | 43 | (Spain) BM Bera Bera |
| 67 | CB | Elba Álvarez | 26 May 2001 (aged 24) | 1.70 m | 19 | 41 | (Spain) BM Bera Bera |
| 68 | P | Lyndie Tchaptchet | 13 January 2005 (aged 20) | 1.85 m | 16 | 29 | (Spain) BM Bera Bera |
| 70 | LB | Carmen Arroyo | 3 March 2004 (aged 21) | 1.80 m | 14 | 22 | (Spain) BM Bera Bera |
| 73 | RB | Maddi Bengoetxea | 15 October 2000 (aged 25) | 1.73 m | 5 | 9 | (Spain) CBF Elda |
| 74 | GK | Lucía Prades | 5 October 2001 (aged 24) | 1.79 m | 7 | 2 | (Spain) BM Bera Bera |
| 76 | LW | Lisa Oppedal | 20 December 2003 (aged 21) | 1.78 m | 9 | 14 | (Spain) CB Elche |
| 93 | GK | Nicole Morales | 5 August 1998 (aged 27) | 1.72 m | 13 | 1 | (Spain) CB Elche |

== Group E ==
=== Argentina ===
The squad was announced on 2 November 2025.

Head coach: Mariano Muñoz

| No. | Pos. | Name | Date of birth (age) | Height | App. | Goals | Club |
|---|---|---|---|---|---|---|---|
| 1 | GK | Marisol Carratú | 15 July 1986 (aged 39) | 1.76 m | 153 | 3 | (Spain) CB Elche |
| 3 | CB | Martina Romero | 18 March 2002 (aged 23) | 1.71 m | 20 | 20 | (Spain) CBF Málaga Costa del Sol |
| 5 | RB | Helena Molina | 30 October 2006 (aged 19) | 1.83 m | 5 | 13 | (Argentina) Asociación Alemana de Quilmes |
| 6 | RW | Ayelén García | 13 December 1999 (aged 25) | 1.67 m | 62 | 103 | (Spain) CD Beti Onak |
| 7 | P | Rocío Campigli | 6 August 1994 (aged 31) | 1.71 m | 215 | 210 | (Spain) CBF Málaga |
| 13 | P | Giuliana Gavilan | 7 March 1996 (aged 29) | 1.76 m | 83 | 113 | (Spain) BM Bera Bera |
| 17 | RB | Malena Cavo | 2 April 1999 (aged 26) | 1.70 m | 63 | 206 | (Poland) MKS Zagłębie Lubin |
| 18 | CB | Macarena Sans | 20 November 1996 (aged 29) | 1.66 m | 109 | 302 | (Spain) CD Beti Onak |
| 20 | LW | Joana Bolling | 6 April 1995 (aged 30) | 1.68 m | 37 | 53 | (Spain) Club Handbol Mislata |
| 22 | LB | Elke Karsten | 15 May 1995 (aged 30) | 1.77 m | 124 | 451 | (Spain) BM Bera Bera |
| 23 | P | Sol Azcun | 24 February 2000 (aged 25) | 1.82 m | 5 | 4 | (Spain) CBF Elda |
| 24 | CB | Carolina Bono | 14 July 2000 (aged 25) | 1.67 m | 46 | 25 | (Spain) BM Porriño |
| 25 | LB | Micaela Casasola | 17 March 1997 (aged 28) | 1.75 m | 101 | 221 | (Spain) CD Beti Onak |
| 26 | LW | Lucia Dalle | 4 December 1998 (aged 26) | 1.62 m | 48 | 73 | (Italy) Handball Erice |
| 27 | LB | Martina Lang | 7 November 2003 (aged 22) | 1.72 m | 8 | 10 | (Spain) BM Remudas |
| 33 | GK | Valentina Menucci | 30 December 2000 (aged 24) | 1.74 m | 0 | 0 | (Spain) Club Balonmano Zonzamas |
| 34 | RW | Berenice Frelier | 6 March 2003 (aged 22) | 1.70 m | 2 | 0 | (Slovakia) IUVENTA Michalovce |

=== Austria ===
The squad was announced on 6 November 2025.

Head coach: (Netherlands) Monique Tijsterman

| No. | Pos. | Name | Date of birth (age) | Height | App. | Goals | Club |
|---|---|---|---|---|---|---|---|
| 1 | GK | Lena Ivančok | 29 March 2001 (aged 24) | 1.75 m | 60 | 3 | (Germany) Neckarsulmer SU |
| 4 | LB | Andrea Barnjak | 18 March 2007 (aged 18) | 1.79 m | 10 | 5 | (Austria) Hypo Niederösterreich |
| 14 | RB | Klara Schlegel | 7 May 2001 (aged 24) | 1.83 m | 39 | 81 | (Germany) TuS Metzingen |
| 17 | LB | Hannah Ginsthofer | 16 March 2003 (aged 22) | 1.80 m | 0 | 0 | (Austria) UHC Tulln |
| 18 | RB | Kristina Dramac | 9 January 2002 (aged 23) | 1.80 m | 23 | 67 | (Croatia) RK Podravka Koprivnica |
| 21 | GK | Antonija Mamic | 26 June 1995 (aged 30) | 1.83 m | 32 | 3 | (Croatia) RK Lokomotiva Zagreb |
| 23 | P | Lina Kovacs | 8 October 2004 (aged 21) | 1.75 m | 4 | 2 | (Austria) Handball Wiener Neustadt |
| 29 | LB | Ines Ivančok-Šoltić | 14 April 1998 (aged 27) | 1.80 m | 75 | 307 | (Hungary) Debreceni VSC |
| 31 | RW | Lisa Spalt | 13 January 2002 (aged 23) | 1.71 m | 3 | 1 | (Austria) Hypo Niederösterreich |
| 44 | P | Nora Leitner | 5 May 2002 (aged 23) | 1.77 m | 38 | 35 | (Portugal) Benfica |
| 54 | LW | Santina Sabatnig | 4 January 2004 (aged 21) | 1.73 m | 42 | 49 | (Germany) HC Rödertal |
| 64 | CB | Ana Pandza | 24 December 2003 (aged 21) | 1.68 m | 44 | 57 | (Croatia) RK Podravka Koprivnica |
| 77 | LW | Marie Scheiderbauer | 8 September 2006 (aged 19) | 1.70 m | 7 | 4 | (Austria) UHC Tulln |
| 81 | CB | Viktoria Marksteiner | 5 November 2005 (aged 20) | 1.70 m | 2 | 0 | (Germany) SV Union Halle-Neustadt |
| 89 | LW | Eleonora Stankovic | 27 October 2002 (aged 23) | 1.70 m | 15 | 31 | (Germany) HC Rödertal |
| 97 | RW | Philomena Egger | 1 May 2007 (aged 18) | 1.77 m | 11 | 30 | (Slovenia) RK Krim |

=== Egypt ===
Head coach: Mohamed Ahmed

| No. | Pos. | Name | Date of birth (age) | Height | App. | Goals | Club |
|---|---|---|---|---|---|---|---|
| 1 | GK | Mai Gomaa | 13 August 1995 (aged 30) | 1.89 m | 15 | 0 | (Poland) AZS Politechnika Koszalin |
| 4 | LW | Amina Accousch | 11 May 2003 (aged 22) | 1.72 m | 33 | 53 | (Egypt) Al Ahly |
| 6 | RW | Ons Yaakoub | 9 April 2008 (aged 17) | 1.64 m | 10 | 22 | (Egypt) Al Zohour SC |
| 7 | RB | Rawan Abdallah | 1 January 2003 (aged 22) | 1.76 m | 19 | 57 | (Egypt) Al Ahly |
| 9 | RB | Shrouk Elsheref | 7 July 2006 (aged 19) | 1.74 m | 45 | 98 | (Egypt) Al Ahly |
| 10 | CB | Ehsan Abdelnaeim | 27 November 1986 (aged 38) | 1.74 m | 24 | 75 | (France) OGC Nice Côte d'Azur Handball |
| 11 | LB | Loijin Abdalla | 17 February 2004 (aged 21) | 1.84 m | 45 | 62 | (Egypt) Smouha SC |
| 22 | LB | Touka Gadallah | 2 December 2004 (aged 20) | 1.77 m | 40 | 83 | (Egypt) Al Ahly |
| 24 | LB | Sondos Essam | 1 January 2008 (aged 17) | 1.68 m | 6 | 19 | (Egypt) Giza Sports Club |
| 25 | RB | Malak Seoudy | 10 January 2002 (aged 23) | 1.70 m | 33 | 46 | (Egypt) Alexandria Sporting Club |
| 28 | CB | Nadein Abdelrahman | 18 December 2004 (aged 20) | 1.72 m | 39 | 62 | (Egypt) Alexandria Sporting Club |
| 33 | RW | Amina Hagag | 1 October 1995 (aged 30) | 1.73 m | 15 | 37 | (Egypt) Al Ahly |
| 44 | P | Mariam Ibrahim | 21 March 2002 (aged 23) | 1.84 m | 18 | 28 | (Egypt) Alexandria Sporting Club |
| 66 | RB | Yara Mahmoud | 30 November 2003 (aged 21) | 1.69 m | 27 | 46 | (Egypt) El Shams SC |
| 89 | P | Fatma Oraby | 17 May 2005 (aged 20) | 1.71 m | 33 | 43 | (Egypt) El Shams SC |
| 90 | LB | Shahd Saadalla | 13 September 2006 (aged 19) | 1.90 m | 22 | 78 | (Egypt) Alexandria Sporting Club |
| 96 | GK | Ganna Ali | 6 December 2006 (aged 18) | 1.80 m | 20 | 0 | (Egypt) Alexandria Sporting Club |
| 98 | GK | Gihad Sayed | 21 February 2006 (aged 19) | 1.78 m | 41 | 0 | (Egypt) Al Ahly |
| 99 | LW | Nouran Abdelsalam | 30 September 1996 (aged 29) | 1.70 m | 15 | 22 | (Egypt) Al Ahly |

=== Netherlands ===
The squad was announced on 12 November 2025.

Head coach: (Sweden) Henrik Signell

| No. | Pos. | Name | Date of birth (age) | Height | App. | Goals | Club |
|---|---|---|---|---|---|---|---|
| 4 | RB | Alieke van Maurik | 11 May 2005 (aged 20) | 1.81 m | 23 | 30 | (Netherlands) OTTO Work Force/VOC |
| 8 | LB | Lois Abbingh (c) | 13 August 1992 (aged 33) | 1.77 m | 232 | 925 | (Germany) Borussia Dortmund |
| 9 | CB | Larissa Nüsser | 8 February 2000 (aged 25) | 1.75 m | 103 | 199 | (Romania) Gloria Bistrița |
| 12 | LW | Bo van Wetering | 5 October 1999 (aged 26) | 1.72 m | 116 | 383 | (Hungary) Győri ETO KC |
| 14 | LB | Judith van der Helm | 13 January 2005 (aged 20) | 1.65 m | 37 | 36 | (Denmark) Team Esbjerg |
| 18 | LB | Kelly Dulfer | 21 March 1994 (aged 31) | 1.85 m | 204 | 333 | (Hungary) Győri ETO KC |
| 19 | P | Merel Freriks | 6 January 1998 (aged 27) | 1.75 m | 105 | 202 | (Romania) CSM București |
| 22 | LW | Zoë Sprengers | 19 January 2000 (aged 25) | 1.66 m | 73 | 154 | (Denmark) Nykøbing Falster Håndboldklub |
| 24 | P | Romée Maarschalkerweerd | 24 September 2004 (aged 21) | 1.78 m | 26 | 46 | (Denmark) HH Elite |
| 26 | RW | Angela Malestein | 31 January 1993 (aged 32) | 1.70 m | 236 | 845 | (Hungary) Ferencvárosi TC |
| 30 | GK | Rinka Duijndam | 6 August 1997 (aged 28) | 1.78 m | 111 | 4 | (France) Chambray Touraine Handball |
| 31 | RW | Kelly Vollebregt | 1 January 1995 (aged 30) | 1.67 m | 53 | 109 | (Germany) Borussia Dortmund |
| 38 | GK | Yara ten Holte | 23 November 1999 (aged 26) | 1.75 m | 81 | 4 | (Denmark) Odense Håndbold |
| 44 | P | Nikita van der Vliet | 14 March 2000 (aged 25) | 1.71 m | 63 | 116 | (Denmark) Odense Håndbold |
| 48 | RB | Dione Housheer | 26 September 1999 (aged 26) | 1.80 m | 116 | 399 | (Hungary) Győri ETO KC |
| 79 | CB | Estavana Polman | 5 August 1992 (aged 33) | 1.73 m | 198 | 668 | (Romania) CS Rapid București |

== Group F ==
=== China ===
Head coach: (France) Yérime Sylla

| No. | Pos. | Name | Date of birth (age) | Height | App. | Goals | Club |
|---|---|---|---|---|---|---|---|
| 1 | GK | Lu Chang | 6 April 1998 (aged 27) | 1.86 m | 44 | 0 | (China) Shandong Handball |
| 3 | LB | Pan Fengying | 26 November 2006 (aged 19) | 1.80 m | 0 | 0 | (China) Beijing Handball |
| 7 | LW | Zhang Siyu | 19 January 2004 (aged 21) | 1.63 m | 0 | 0 | (China) Anhui Handball |
| 8 | CB | Liang Jing | 14 April 2006 (aged 19) | 1.73 m | 0 | 0 | (China) Anhui Handball |
| 9 | P | Jiang Xintong | 30 August 1990 (aged 35) | 1.75 m | 0 | 0 | (China) Shanghai Handball |
| 10 | RW | Shi Zihan | 31 October 2005 (aged 20) | 1.72 m | 0 | 0 | (China) Jiangsu Handball |
| 11 | RB | Liu Chan | 10 August 1998 (aged 27) | 1.80 m | 30 | 37 | (China) Shandong Handball |
| 12 | GK | Yang Wenqi | 8 December 2005 (aged 19) | 1.79 m | 0 | 0 | (China) Anhui Handball |
| 13 | LB | Wei Xinxin | 11 June 2006 (aged 19) | 1.62 m | 0 | 0 | (China) Shanghai Handball |
| 16 | GK | Huang Sitong | 20 December 2006 (aged 18) | 1.77 m | 13 | 0 | (China) Jiangsu Handball |
| 18 | RB | Wang Jingjing | 2 April 2005 (aged 20) | 1.74 m | 0 | 0 | (China) Anhui Handball |
| 19 | RB | Zhuo Ziyi | 8 December 2005 (aged 19) | 1.75 m | 0 | 0 | (China) Beijing Handball |
| 21 | RW | Zhang Pingping | 15 November 1999 (aged 26) | 1.70 m | 0 | 0 | (China) Shanghai Handball |
| 23 | P | Li Yuanmeng | 24 December 2002 (aged 22) | 1.75 m | 0 | 0 | (China) Jiangsu Handball |
| 24 | CB | Qu Wenna | 2 January 2002 (aged 23) | 1.73 m | 13 | 5 | (China) Jiangsu Handball |
| 28 | CB | Liu Xuedan | 13 October 2005 (aged 20) | 1.72 m | 14 | 45 | (China) Anhui Handball |
| 32 | P | Li Ziai | 23 December 2006 (aged 18) | 1.76 m | 0 | 0 | (China) Jiangsu Handball |
| 53 | LW | Liu Yuting | 18 July 2004 (aged 21) | 1.68 m | 25 | 51 | (China) Anhui Handball |

=== France ===
A 20-player squad was announced on 31 October 2025. The final squad was announced on 24 November. On 4 December, Lilou Pintat replaced Méline Nocandy in the squad due to an injury.

Head coach: Sébastien Gardillou

| No. | Pos. | Name | Date of birth (age) | Height | App. | Goals | Club |
|---|---|---|---|---|---|---|---|
| 2 | CB | Méline Nocandy | 25 February 1998 (aged 27) | 1.75 m | 87 | 170 | (France) Brest Bretagne Handball |
| 3 | RW | Alicia Toublanc | 3 May 1996 (aged 29) | 1.69 m | 71 | 192 | (Hungary) Debreceni VSC |
| 5 | LB | Clarisse Mairot | 27 January 2001 (aged 24) | 1.70 m | 15 | 12 | (France) Brest Bretagne Handball |
| 12 | GK | Floriane André | 30 May 2000 (aged 25) | 1.86 m | 25 | 2 | (France) Brest Bretagne Handball |
| 14 | LW | Nina Dury | 16 January 2004 (aged 21) | 1.74 m | 6 | 19 | (France) JDA Dijon Handball |
| 15 | RB | Marie-Hélène Sajka | 13 September 1997 (aged 28) | 1.85 m | 9 | 14 | (France) OGC Nice Côte d'Azur Handball |
| 18 | P | Lilou Pintat | 9 November 2004 (aged 21) | 1.80 m | 4 | 0 | (France) JDA Dijon Handball |
| 21 | LB | Orlane Kanor | 16 June 1997 (aged 28) | 1.79 m | 118 | 255 | (Hungary) Ferencvárosi TC |
| 22 | CB | Tamara Horacek (c) | 5 November 1995 (aged 30) | 1.78 m | 112 | 231 | (Slovenia) RK Krim |
| 25 | RB | Emma Jacques | 29 November 2001 (aged 23) | 1.90 m | 8 | 4 | (Hungary) Esztergomi KC |
| 26 | P | Pauletta Foppa | 22 December 2000 (aged 24) | 1.77 m | 111 | 277 | (France) Brest Bretagne Handball |
| 28 | RW | Lucie Granier | 11 May 1999 (aged 26) | 1.67 m | 70 | 146 | (France) Metz Handball |
| 29 | P | Oriane Ondono | 14 April 1996 (aged 29) | 1.80 m | 53 | 67 | (France) Brest Bretagne Handball |
| 30 | GK | Camille Depuiset | 19 October 1998 (aged 27) | 1.79 m | 10 | 0 | (France) Brest Bretagne Handball |
| 32 | P | Sarah Bouktit | 27 August 2002 (aged 23) | 1.83 m | 49 | 96 | (France) Metz Handball |
| 34 | CB | Léna Grandveau | 21 January 2003 (aged 22) | 1.70 m | 53 | 86 | (France) Metz Handball |
| 96 | LB | Fatou Karamoko | 14 December 2005 (aged 19) | 1.76 m | 2 | 1 | (France) Stella Saint-Maur Handball |
| 98 | LW | Suzanne Wajoka | 2 January 2001 (aged 24) | 1.71 m | 7 | 20 | (France) Metz Handball |
| 99 | GK | Hatadou Sako | 21 October 1995 (aged 30) | 1.74 m | 44 | 0 | (Hungary) Győri ETO KC |

=== Poland ===
The squad was announced on 5 November 2025.

Head coach: (Norway) Arne Senstad

| No. | Pos. | Name | Date of birth (age) | Height | App. | Goals | Club |
|---|---|---|---|---|---|---|---|
| 4 | P | Aleksandra Olek | 31 October 2000 (aged 25) | 1.78 m | 34 | 51 | (Romania) HC Dunărea Brăila |
| 8 | RB | Monika Kobylińska | 9 April 1995 (aged 30) | 1.77 m | 131 | 470 | (Romania) CS Gloria Bistrița Nasaud |
| 13 | RW | Natalia Janas | 16 September 1999 (aged 26) | 1.70 m | 7 | 3 | (Poland) MKS Zagłębie Lubin |
| 16 | GK | Adrianna Płaczek | 10 December 1993 (aged 31) | 1.74 m | 118 | 1 | (Hungary) DVSC Schaeffler |
| 21 | GK | Barbara Zima | 14 January 2000 (aged 25) | 1.89 m | 62 | 10 | (Poland) MKS Zagłębie Lubin |
| 22 | LB | Aleksandra Rosiak | 7 July 1997 (aged 28) | 1.82 m | 85 | 198 | (Poland) MKS Lublin |
| 26 | GK | Paulina Wdowiak | 12 January 2000 (aged 25) | 1.74 m | 23 | 0 | (Poland) MKS Lublin |
| 27 | CB | Magdalena Drażyk | 23 February 1997 (aged 28) | 1.69 m | 16 | 17 | (Poland) KPR Kobierzyce |
| 29 | LB | Katarzyna Cygan | 9 March 2000 (aged 25) | 1.84 m | 12 | 19 | (Poland) MKS Urbis Gniezno |
| 31 | RW | Magda Balsam | 20 September 1996 (aged 29) | 1.72 m | 69 | 240 | (Romania) CSM Slatina |
| 33 | P | Nikola Głębocka | 14 February 2002 (aged 23) | 1.80 m | 10 | 9 | (Poland) MKS Urbis Gniezno |
| 36 | P | Natalia Pankowska | 11 March 2002 (aged 23) | 1.79 m | 5 | 6 | (Poland) Piotrcovia Piotrków Trybunalski |
| 39 | RB | Natalia Nosek | 20 April 1998 (aged 27) | 1.79 m | 67 | 99 | (Romania) SCM Craiova |
| 40 | LW | Daria Michalak | 12 December 1995 (aged 29) | 1.71 m | 73 | 128 | (Romania) HC Dunărea Brăila |
| 49 | CB | Karolina Kochaniak | 5 July 1995 (aged 30) | 1.75 m | 60 | 126 | (Poland) MKS Zagłębie Lubin |
| 78 | LB | Paulina Uścinowicz | 16 October 1999 (aged 26) | 1.83 m | 38 | 60 | (Germany) Neckarsulmer SU |
| 96 | LW | Dagmara Nocuń | 2 January 1996 (aged 29) | 1.60 m | 77 | 124 | (Montenegro) OTP Group Buducnost |

=== Tunisia ===
Head coach: (France) Pablo Morel

| No. | Pos. | Name | Date of birth (age) | Height | App. | Goals | Club |
|---|---|---|---|---|---|---|---|
| 1 | GK | Roua Bouida | 12 September 2001 (aged 24) | 1.70 m | 7 | 0 | (Tunisia) ASF Sahel |
| 2 | LB | Maroua Dhaouadi | 22 May 1992 (aged 33) | 1.80 m | 58 | 143 | (Tunisia) Club Africain |
| 5 | RW | Aya Ben Abdallah | 19 August 1997 (aged 28) | 1.68 m | 24 | 36 | (Romania) HC Zalău |
| 6 | P | Amal Ben Hassine | 23 February 2004 (aged 21) | 1.76 m | 13 | 28 | (Tunisia) El Menzah Sport |
| 7 | LW | Fatma Bouri | 29 January 1993 (aged 32) | 1.79 m | 30 | 32 | (Tunisia) Club Africain |
| 8 | CB | Fadwa Aouij | 23 February 2001 (aged 24) | 1.71 m | 25 | 89 | (France) Club Africain |
| 10 | RB | Amal Hamrouni | 16 June 1995 (aged 30) | 1.56 m | 45 | 195 | (France) La Roche-sur-Yon Vendée handball |
| 12 | GK | Roa Mkadem | 9 April 2000 (aged 25) | 1.78 m | 14 | 0 | (Tunisia) Sporting Club de Moknine |
| 13 | P | Yosr Mostefaoui | 18 August 2006 (aged 19) | 1.80 m | 0 | 0 | (France) Achenheim Truchtersheim Handball |
| 14 | P | Mouna Jlezi | 22 June 1991 (aged 34) | 1.73 m | 37 | 63 | (Romania) HC Zalău |
| 16 | GK | Basma Sfar | 30 November 1997 (aged 27) | 1.81 m | 12 | 0 | (France) Blanzat Sport Montluçon |
| 18 | CB | Salma Ben Hassine | 18 September 2005 (aged 20) | 1.76 m | 12 | 59 | (Tunisia) Association Sportive Féminine de Mahdia |
| 19 | RW | Nada Zelfani | 11 November 2000 (aged 25) | 1.73 m | 20 | 70 | (Tunisia) ASF Sahel |
| 20 | LW | Mariem Rezgui | 20 January 1997 (aged 28) | 1.73 m | 10 | 7 | (Tunisia) Sporting Club de Moknine |
| 21 | CB | Sondes Hachana | 7 September 1996 (aged 29) | 1.72 m | 38 | 97 | (Tunisia) Sporting Club de Moknine |
| 27 | RW | Houda Rmiza | 19 June 2004 (aged 21) | 1.58 m | 13 | 55 | (Tunisia) Club Africain |
| 55 | LB | Mayssa Ben Hassine | 16 December 2004 (aged 20) | 1.70 m | 0 | 0 | (France) Paris 92 |
| 98 | CB | Soumaya Belhadj | 30 September 1998 (aged 27) | 1.71 m | 19 | 34 | (Tunisia) Sporting Club de Moknine |

== Group G ==
=== Brazil ===
The squad was announced on 6 November 2025.

Head coach: Cristiano Silva

| No. | Pos. | Name | Date of birth (age) | Height | App. | Goals | Club |
|---|---|---|---|---|---|---|---|
| 1 | GK | Gabriela Moreschi | 8 July 1994 (aged 31) | 1.90 m | 99 | 0 | (Romania) CSM București |
| 2 | LB | Bruna de Paula | 26 September 1996 (aged 29) | 1.70 m | 120 | 410 | (Hungary) Győri ETO KC |
| 3 | RW | Alexandra do Nascimento | 16 September 1981 (aged 44) | 1.77 m | 206 | 789 | (Italy) Handball Erice |
| 6 | LB | Mariane Fernándes | 4 January 1996 (aged 29) | 1.65 m | 72 | 180 | (Poland) Zagłębie Lubin |
| 8 | LW | Jamily do Nascimento | 8 January 1998 (aged 27) | 1.63 m | 20 | 44 | (Brazil) Clube Português do Recife |
| 10 | RW | Jéssica Quintino | 17 April 1991 (aged 34) | 1.72 m | 165 | 458 | (Romania) Minaur Baia Mare |
| 19 | P | Milena Menezes | 1 October 2000 (aged 25) | 1.80 m | 18 | 23 | (Hungary) Szombathelyi KKA |
| 20 | LW | Larissa Araújo | 1 July 1992 (aged 33) | 1.67 m | 115 | 247 | (Romania) CSM Corona Brașov |
| 23 | RB | Giulia Guarieiro | 24 July 1995 (aged 30) | 1.75 m | 70 | 110 | (Germany) Thüringer HC |
| 28 | RB | Micaela Rodrigues | 8 February 2003 (aged 22) | 1.73 m | 16 | 35 | (Spain) BM Bera Bera |
| 30 | RB | Gabriela Bitolo | 1 April 1999 (aged 26) | 1.82 m | 40 | 74 | (Germany) TuS Metzingen |
| 33 | P | Sabryne Santos | 3 February 2001 (aged 24) | 1.80 m | 15 | 4 | (Portugal) AA S. Pedro do Sul |
| 35 | CB | Maria Grasielly Brasil | 12 March 2001 (aged 24) | 1.73 m | 14 | 20 | (Spain) CD Beti Onak |
| 36 | P | Marcela Arounian | 7 January 2000 (aged 25) | 1.83 m | 55 | 87 | (France) Saint-Amand Handball |
| 42 | CB | Jhennifer Lopes | 28 July 2000 (aged 25) | 1.77 m | 50 | 27 | (France) Saint-Amand Handball |
| 77 | LB | Kelly Rosa | 25 January 2004 (aged 21) | 1.78 m | 34 | 73 | (Hungary) Dunaújvárosi Kohász KA |
| 87 | GK | Renata Arruda | 18 February 1999 (aged 26) | 1.78 m | 78 | 7 | (Romania) Gloria Bistrița-Năsăud |
| 90 | RW | Agda Gonçalves | 14 May 1990 (aged 35) | 1.64 m | 7 | 13 | (Spain) CBF Elda |

=== Czech Republic ===
The provisional squad was announced on 14 November 2025. The final squad was announced on 24 November. On 4 December Michaela Malá replaced Sabrina Novotná due to an injury.

Head coaches: (Slovakia) Tomáš Hlavatý / Daniel Čurda

| No. | Pos. | Name | Date of birth (age) | Height | App. | Goals | Club |
|---|---|---|---|---|---|---|---|
| 14 | CB | Kamila Kordovská | 4 December 1997 (aged 27) | 1.79 m | 104 | 217 | (Germany) Sport-Union Neckarsulm |
| 17 | P | Karolína Pejšová | 11 June 2005 (aged 20) | 1.83 m | 5 | 0 | (Czech Republic) DHC Slavia Praha |
| 22 | RB | Markéta Šustáčková | 9 April 1997 (aged 28) | 1.74 m | 77 | 132 | (Czech Republic) DHK Baník Most |
| 23 | RB | Marie Poláková | 29 July 2002 (aged 23) | 1.75 m | 10 | 6 | (Germany) TSV Kirchhain |
| 24 | LB | Eliška Desortová | 19 April 2000 (aged 25) | 1.75 m | 35 | 36 | (Slovakia) HC DAC Dunajská Streda |
| 27 | GK | Patricie Wizurová | 1 June 2005 (aged 20) | 1.85 m | 12 | 0 | (Czech Republic) DHC Sokol Poruba |
| 34 | CB | Julie Franková | 4 October 2000 (aged 25) | 1.79 m | 54 | 37 | (Czech Republic) DHK Baník Most |
| 35 | RW | Valerie Smetková | 10 January 2001 (aged 24) | 1.72 m | 21 | 64 | (Hungary) Szombathelyi KKA |
| 37 | GK | Michaela Malá | 12 January 2003 (aged 22) | 1.76 m | 4 | 0 | (Czech Republic) DHC Slavia Praha |
| 38 | RW | Anna Franková | 2 October 1996 (aged 29) | 1.70 m | 47 | 57 | (Germany) TuS Metzingen |
| 39 | LB | Veronika Vávrová | 26 April 2005 (aged 20) | 1.78 m | 7 | 9 | (Czech Republic) Házená Kynžvart |
| 43 | RB | Veronika Holečková | 8 September 2003 (aged 22) | 1.72 m | 7 | 5 | (Czech Republic) DHC Slavia Praha |
| 44 | RW | Dominika Zachová | 4 June 1996 (aged 29) | 1.75 m | 88 | 245 | (Czech Republic) DHK Baník Most |
| 67 | LW | Veronika Kafka Malá (c) | 6 May 1994 (aged 31) | 1.70 m | 120 | 394 | (Norway) Storhamar HE |
| 79 | GK | Sabrina Novotná | 2 July 2000 (aged 25) | 1.83 m | 46 | 3 | (France) Metz Handball |
| 88 | LW | Klára Kubálková | 11 December 2002 (aged 22) | 1.74 m | 10 | 9 | (Czech Republic) DHK Zora Olomouc |
| 91 | P | Anna Jestříbková | 29 February 2004 (aged 21) | 1.78 m | 26 | 18 | (Czech Republic) DHK Baník Most |
| 96 | LB | Charlotte Cholevová | 29 July 2002 (aged 23) | 1.73 m | 60 | 263 | (Germany) TuS Metzingen |

=== Cuba ===
Head coach: Osvaldo Hernández

| No. | Pos. | Name | Date of birth (age) | Height | App. | Goals | Club |
|---|---|---|---|---|---|---|---|
| 1 | GK | Niurkis Mora | 6 October 1994 (aged 31) | 1.83 m | 36 | 4 | (France) Rouen Handball |
| 2 | RW | Zajaris Hernández | 26 January 2006 (aged 19) | 1.83 m | 15 | 31 | Santiago de Cuba |
| 4 | RW | Liliamnis Rosabal | 3 July 1999 (aged 26) | 1.73 m | 29 | 31 | (Cuba) Granma |
| 6 | P | Dianny González | 19 September 1998 (aged 27) | 1.81 m | 18 | 31 | (Cuba) Matanzas Handball |
| 10 | RW | Gleinys Reyes | 31 July 1989 (aged 36) | 1.78 m | 35 | 62 | (Spain) CB Zonzamas |
| 11 | CB | Diancy González | 19 September 1998 (aged 27) | 1.70 m | 10 | 8 | (Cuba) Matanzas Handball |
| 15 | RW | Odalys Escalona | 1 October 1983 (aged 42) | 1.74 m | 24 | 10 | (Spain) CB Bolaños |
| 16 | GK | Danielys Herranz | 26 January 1999 (aged 26) | 1.78 m | 35 | 2 | (Italy) HAC Nuoro |
| 17 | CB | Angela Amoros | 11 May 1992 (aged 33) | 1.68 m | 24 | 28 | (Cuba) Matanzas Handball |
| 18 | RB | Lorena Téllez | 26 November 1996 (aged 29) | 1.82 m | 25 | 49 | (Spain) CB Atlético Guardés |
| 24 | LB | Schakira Robert | 5 September 1996 (aged 29) | 1.75 m | 25 | 17 | (Spain) Ciudad Real |
| 26 | RW | Anna Sardiñas | 27 October 2007 (aged 18) | 1.85 m | 5 | 21 | (Cuba) La Habana |
| 30 | CB | Adriana Arencibia | 3 March 2003 (aged 22) | 1.72 m | 0 | 0 | (Cuba) Villa Clara |
| 34 | LW | Yennifer Toledo | 1 October 2000 (aged 25) | 1.83 m | 22 | 58 | (Kosovo) KHF Samadrexha |
| 55 | CB | Yarumy Céspedes | 2 January 1996 (aged 29) | 1.70 m | 28 | 45 | (Spain) CB T-Maravilla |
| 80 | P | Melissa Chala | 27 April 2004 (aged 21) | 1.82 m | 24 | 21 | (Cuba) Pinar del Río |

=== Sweden ===
The squad was announced on 27 October 2025. On 25 November, Vilma Matthijs Holmberg was added to the squad. On 3 December, Linn Hansson replaced Anna Lagerquist in the squad due to an injury.

Head coach: Tomas Axnér

| No. | Pos. | Name | Date of birth (age) | Height | App. | Goals | Club |
|---|---|---|---|---|---|---|---|
| 1 | GK | Johanna Bundsen | 3 June 1991 (aged 34) | 1.85 m | 172 | 16 | (France) Metz Handball |
| 2 | LW | Clara Lerby | 8 May 1999 (aged 26) | 1.72 m | 29 | 95 | (Denmark) Nykøbing Falster Håndboldklub |
| 3 | RB | Nina Koppang | 31 May 2002 (aged 23) | 1.78 m | 44 | 76 | (Denmark) Team Esbjerg |
| 7 | P | Linn Blohm | 20 May 1992 (aged 33) | 1.80 m | 193 | 564 | (Hungary) Győri ETO KC |
| 8 | LB | Jamina Roberts (c) | 28 May 1990 (aged 35) | 1.76 m | 263 | 710 | (Denmark) Ikast Håndbold |
| 10 | RW | Mathilda Lundström | 20 December 1996 (aged 28) | 1.64 m | 91 | 135 | (Denmark) HH Elite |
| 11 | LB | Tyra Axnér | 18 March 2002 (aged 23) | 1.78 m | 62 | 122 | (France) Metz Handball |
| 12 | GK | Filippa Idéhn | 15 August 1990 (aged 35) | 1.83 m | 137 | 11 | (Denmark) Ikast Håndbold |
| 19 | P | Anna Lagerquist | 16 October 1993 (aged 32) | 1.75 m | 120 | 127 | (Hungary) Győri ETO KC |
| 21 | GK | Evelina Eriksson | 20 August 1996 (aged 29) | 1.84 m | 51 | 1 | (Romania) CSM București |
| 23 | CB | Emma Lindqvist | 17 September 1997 (aged 28) | 1.77 m | 118 | 271 | (Denmark) Ikast Håndbold |
| 24 | RW | Nathalie Hagman | 19 July 1991 (aged 34) | 1.67 m | 251 | 972 | (Hungary) Győri ETO KC |
| 27 | RB | Thea Kylberg | 20 June 2004 (aged 21) | 1.83 m | 6 | 10 | (Denmark) Ikast Håndbold |
| 29 | LB | Kristin Thorleifsdóttir | 13 January 1998 (aged 27) | 1.82 m | 90 | 137 | (Hungary) Debreceni VSC |
| 38 | LW | Elin Hansson | 7 August 1996 (aged 29) | 1.73 m | 103 | 256 | (Denmark) Team Esbjerg |
| 40 | P | Vilma Matthijs Holmberg | 25 February 1999 (aged 26) | 1.73 m | 15 | 4 | (France) Chambray Touraine Handball |
| 42 | CB | Jenny Carlson | 17 April 1995 (aged 30) | 1.72 m | 85 | 233 | (Norway) Molde Elite |
| 49 | P | Olivia Löfqvist | 13 July 1998 (aged 27) | 1.77 m | 38 | 44 | (Denmark) Team Esbjerg |
| 97 | LW | Linn Hansson | 18 September 1997 (aged 28) | 1.69 m | 7 | 11 | (France) Paris 92 |

== Group H ==
=== Angola ===
The squad was announced on 10 November 2025.

Head coach: (Spain) Carlos Viver

| No. | Pos. | Name | Date of birth (age) | Height | App. | Goals | Club |
|---|---|---|---|---|---|---|---|
| 1 | GK | Marta Alberto | 10 February 1995 (aged 30) | 1.82 m | 18 | 1 | (Angola) Petro de Luanda |
| 2 | CB | Vilma Nenganga | 12 September 1996 (aged 29) | 1.75 m | 24 | 63 | (Angola) Petro de Luanda |
| 4 | LW | Marcela Tati | 12 December 2004 (aged 20) | 1.78 m | 30 | 44 | (Angola) Primeiro de Agosto |
| 5 | P | Liliane Mario | 16 November 2004 (aged 21) | 1.77 m | 31 | 62 | (Slovenia) RK Krim |
| 6 | RB | Juliana Machado | 6 November 1994 (aged 31) | 1.72 m | 89 | 179 | (Angola) Primeiro de Agosto |
| 7 | RW | Dolores Rosário | 1 April 2003 (aged 22) | 1.76 m | 25 | 53 | (Angola) Primeiro de Agosto |
| 8 | CB | Helena Paulo | 24 January 1998 (aged 27) | 1.73 m | 63 | 208 | (Romania) Târgu Jiu |
| 9 | LW | Natália Santos | 25 December 1986 (aged 38) | 1.73 m | 300 | 248 | (Angola) Primeiro de Agosto |
| 10 | P | Albertina Kassoma | 12 June 1996 (aged 29) | 1.85 m | 104 | 302 | (Romania) Rapid București |
| 11 | LW | Marília Quizelete | 3 June 1997 (aged 28) | 1.73 m | 38 | 64 | (Angola) Petro de Luanda |
| 12 | GK | Cristina Miguel | 7 August 2003 (aged 22) | 1.73 m | 15 | 0 | (Angola) Primeiro de Agosto |
| 15 | LB | Rossana Mateus | 11 September 2000 (aged 25) | 1.84 m | 0 | 0 | (Angola) Primeiro de Agosto |
| 25 | P | Liliane Venancio | 19 September 1995 (aged 30) | 1.91 m | 55 | 74 | (Romania) HC Dunărea Brăila |
| 30 | GK | Eliane Paulo | 9 March 1999 (aged 26) | 1.81 m | 12 | 0 | (Angola) Primeiro de Agosto |
| 35 | RB | Azenaide Carlos | 14 June 1990 (aged 35) | 1.73 m | 113 | 174 | (Serbia) ŽRK Crvena zvezda |
| 77 | LB | Bernadeth Belo | 2 January 2004 (aged 21) | 1.82 m | 37 | 121 | (Angola) Primeiro de Agosto |
| 88 | RW | Balbina Nunda | 29 October 2006 (aged 19) | 1.73 m | 9 | 49 | (Angola) Primeiro de Agosto |
| 90 | CB | Isabel Guialo | 8 April 1990 (aged 35) | 1.70 m | 101 | 324 | (Angola) Primeiro de Agosto |

=== Kazakhstan ===
Head coach: Aliaksandr Sytsko

| No. | Pos. | Name | Date of birth (age) | Height | App. | Goals | Club |
|---|---|---|---|---|---|---|---|
| 3 | P | Mariya Sitnikova | 11 October 1998 (aged 27) | 1.65 m | 37 | 62 | (Kazakhstan) Handball Club Turan |
| 4 | LB | Zhanerke Kuandykova | 25 February 2004 (aged 21) | 1.80 m | 33 | 49 | (Kazakhstan) Handball Club Astana |
| 5 | LB | Aiym Tursyn | 29 August 2007 (aged 18) | 1.64 m | 9 | 23 | (Kazakhstan) HC Alatay |
| 7 | CB | Aida Zhaparova | 16 February 2000 (aged 25) | 1.60 m | 35 | 85 | (Kazakhstan) Azeryol HC |
| 8 | LB | Nazym Sabyrzhankyzy | 17 May 2002 (aged 23) | 1.80 m | 8 | 36 | (Kazakhstan) Kaysar Club |
| 10 | RB | Kristina Radayeva | 4 January 1995 (aged 30) | 1.79 m | 79 | 183 | (North Macedonia) HC Gjorce Petrov |
| 11 | P | Zlata Zvyagina | 26 November 2002 (aged 23) | 1.72 m | 52 | 71 | (Kazakhstan) Kaysar Club |
| 12 | GK | Zhannat Aitenova | 5 November 1989 (aged 36) | 1.82 m | 120 | 4 | (Kazakhstan) Kaysar Club |
| 15 | LB | Irina Khassakhanova | 2 October 1994 (aged 31) | 1.87 m | 115 | 298 | (Kazakhstan) HC Alatay |
| 16 | GK | Darya Kolesnichenko | 8 August 2004 (aged 21) | 1.78 m | 18 | 0 | (Kazakhstan) HC Kazygurt |
| 17 | RW | Zhanerke Seitkassym | 5 December 2002 (aged 22) | 1.62 m | 52 | 91 | (Kazakhstan) Kaysar Club |
| 22 | P | Madina Myrzamseiitova | 4 February 2005 (aged 20) | 1.82 m | 25 | 41 | (Kazakhstan) Handball Club Astana |
| 35 | P | Kira Nemtyreva | 7 January 2005 (aged 20) | 1.80 m | 8 | 19 | (Kazakhstan) HC Karaganda |
| 44 | GK | Damira Zhaparova | 27 November 2005 (aged 19) | 1.70 m | 27 | 0 | (Kazakhstan) Handball Club Astana |
| 99 | RB | Mariya Pupchenkova | 10 March 1998 (aged 27) | 1.78 m | 82 | 127 | (Kazakhstan) Kaysar Club |

=== Norway ===
The squad was announced on 5 November 2025.

Head coach: Ole Gjekstad

| No. | Pos. | Name | Date of birth (age) | Height | App. | Goals | Club |
|---|---|---|---|---|---|---|---|
| 4 | LB | Veronica Kristiansen | 10 July 1990 (aged 35) | 1.74 m | 195 | 619 | (Hungary) Győri ETO KC |
| 5 | CB | Anniken Obaidli | 22 June 1995 (aged 30) | 1.72 m | 22 | 25 | (Norway) Storhamar HE |
| 6 | P | Maren Nyland Aardahl | 2 March 1994 (aged 31) | 1.83 m | 82 | 145 | (Denmark) Odense Håndbold |
| 7 | RB | Stine Skogrand | 3 March 1993 (aged 32) | 1.73 m | 175 | 354 | (Denmark) Ikast Håndbold |
| 8 | CB | Live Rushfeldt Deila | 15 January 2000 (aged 25) | 1.76 m | 29 | 40 | (Denmark) Team Esbjerg |
| 9 | RB | Nora Mørk | 5 April 1991 (aged 34) | 1.69 m | 195 | 923 | (Denmark) Team Esbjerg |
| 11 | RW | Malin Aune | 4 March 1995 (aged 30) | 1.65 m | 108 | 200 | (Norway) Storhamar HE |
| 14 | LB | Kristine Breistøl | 23 August 1993 (aged 32) | 1.92 m | 111 | 196 | (Hungary) Győri ETO KC |
| 15 | P | Vilde Ingstad | 18 December 1994 (aged 30) | 1.80 m | 139 | 216 | (Hungary) Ferencvárosi TC |
| 16 | GK | Katrine Lunde | 30 March 1980 (aged 45) | 1.80 m | 380 | 3 | (Serbia) ŽRK Crvena zvezda |
| 19 | P | Selma Henriksen | 25 July 2002 (aged 23) | 1.79 m | 8 | 23 | (Norway) Sola HK |
| 21 | LB | Ingvild Bakkerud | 9 July 1995 (aged 30) | 1.83 m | 78 | 130 | (Denmark) Odense Håndbold |
| 25 | CB | Henny Reistad (c) | 9 February 1999 (aged 26) | 1.81 m | 109 | 478 | (Denmark) Team Esbjerg |
| 26 | RW | Emilie Hovden | 5 April 1996 (aged 29) | 1.63 m | 62 | 157 | (Hungary) Győri ETO KC |
| 33 | LB | Thale Rushfeldt Deila | 15 January 2000 (aged 25) | 1.78 m | 71 | 169 | (Denmark) Odense Håndbold |
| 34 | LW | Anniken Wollik | 5 December 1997 (aged 27) | 1.66 m | 18 | 20 | (Romania) SCM Râmnicu Vâlcea |
| 40 | GK | Eli Marie Raasok | 21 November 1996 (aged 29) | 1.76 m | 20 | 1 | (Norway) Storhamar HE |
| 44 | GK | June Krogh | 2 December 2003 (aged 21) | 1.87 m | 10 | 0 | (Norway) Storhamar HE |

=== South Korea ===
Head coach: Lee Kye-chung

| No. | Pos. | Name | Date of birth (age) | Height | App. | Goals | Club |
|---|---|---|---|---|---|---|---|
| 7 | LW | Lee Won-jung | 17 May 2002 (aged 23) | 1.71 m | 6 | 16 | (South Korea) Powerful Daegu |
| 9 | CB | Lee Yeong-yeong | 2 October 1991 (aged 34) | 1.65 m | 0 | 0 | (South Korea) Gyeongnam Development Corporation |
| 10 | P | Song Hae-ri | 2 October 1997 (aged 28) | 1.73 m | 0 | 0 | (South Korea) Busan Bisco |
| 11 | CB | Kim Yeon-woo | 13 October 2003 (aged 22) | 1.65 m | 6 | 4 | (South Korea) Gyeongnam Development Corporation |
| 12 | GK | Jeong Jin-hui | 24 March 1999 (aged 26) | 1.80 m | 28 | 0 | (South Korea) Seoul City Hall |
| 16 | GK | Park Sae-young | 11 August 1994 (aged 31) | 1.76 m | 26 | 0 | (South Korea) Wonderful Samcheok |
| 18 | P | Yeon Ji-hyun | 5 March 2002 (aged 23) | 1.75 m | 7 | 6 | (South Korea) Gwangju City Corporation |
| 19 | LB | Kim Da-young | 16 September 1996 (aged 29) | 1.70 m | 5 | 5 | (South Korea) Busan Bisco |
| 23 | LB | Song Ji-eun | 4 September 1996 (aged 29) | 1.70 m | 0 | 0 | (South Korea) Sk Sugar Gliders |
| 24 | LB | Hur You-jin | 24 January 1996 (aged 29) | 1.70 m | 0 | 0 | (South Korea) Wonderful Samcheok |
| 26 | LB | Woo Bit-na | 23 October 2001 (aged 24) | 1.72 m | 19 | 69 | (South Korea) Seoul City Hall |
| 27 | RW | Jeon Ji-yeon | 2 May 2003 (aged 22) | 1.68 m | 17 | 25 | (South Korea) Wonderful Samcheok |
| 29 | LW | Yun Ye-jin | 3 November 2000 (aged 25) | 1.63 m | 13 | 16 | (South Korea) Seoul City Hall |
| 31 | P | Gim Bo-eun | 8 December 1997 (aged 27) | 1.77 m | 18 | 28 | (South Korea) Wonderful Samcheok |
| 33 | RB | Jung Ji-in | 18 July 2000 (aged 25) | 1.80 m | 14 | 17 | (South Korea) Powerful Daegu |
| 35 | RB | Lee Hye-won | 16 May 2004 (aged 21) | 1.68 m | 22 | 78 | (South Korea) Busan Bisco |
| 36 | RW | Cha Seo-yeon | 24 July 2004 (aged 21) | 1.62 m | 15 | 64 | (South Korea) Incheon Metropolitan City |
| 37 | CB | Kim Min-seo | 14 February 2004 (aged 21) | 1.60 m | 8 | 58 | (South Korea) Wonderful Samcheok |
