= Handball at the 2026 Asian Games =

- Venue: Kasugai City General Gymnasium; Toyoda Gosei Memorial Gymnasium
- Date: 19 – 29 September 2026
- Nations: 11

The handball tournament at the 2026 Asian Games was held between 19 and 29 September 2026 at two locations in Aichi Prefecture. In this tournament, nine teams participate in the men's competition, while seven teams participate in the women's competition.

== Schedule ==
The schedule is as follows:

●	Round	●	Last round	P	Preliminary round	¼	Quarterfinals	½	Semifinals	F	Finals

Event↓/Date →	19th Sat	20th Sun	21st Mon	22nd Tue	23rd Wed	24th Thu	25th Fri	26th Sat	27th Sun	28th Mon	29th Tue
Men	P	P	P	P	P	—N/a	P	¼	—N/a	½	F
Women	●	●	—N/a	●	●	—N/a	●	●	●	—N/a	

== Medal summary ==
=== Medal table ===
* Host nation (Japan)

Rank	Nation	Gold	Silver	Bronze	Total
1	Bahrain	1	0	0	1
1	South Korea	1	0	0	1
3	Japan*	0	1	1	2
4	Qatar	0	1	0	1
5	China	0	0	1	1
Totals (5 entries)		2	2	2	6

=== Medalists ===
Event	Gold	Silver	Bronze
Men	Bahrain; Mohamed Rabia; Hesham Isa; Salman Al-Showaikh; Ahmed Kadhem; Ahmed Jalal; Mohamed Ali; Abdulla Abdulkarim; Sayed Shubbar; Hasan Madan; Ali Mohamed; Ahmed Eid; Jasim Khamis; Hasan Merza; Mohamed Habib; Mohamed Habib Naser; Husain Al-Sayyad	Qatar; Ahmad Madadi; Rafael Capote; Frankis Carol; Abdulrazzaq Murad; Saifdinne Dhib; Eldar Memišević; Nasreddine Megdich; Firas Zemzemi; Abdelrahman Abdalla; Ahmed Abdelrhem; Youssef Ali; Amine Guehis; Malek Soussou; Mohamedali Hamam; Ameen Zakkar; Ebrahim Ebaid	Japan; Takumi Nakamura; Kota Nakata; Taiga Tsutaya; Tomoya Sakurai; Daisuke Tanaka; Adam Baig; Soya Ichihara; Naoki Sugioka; Jin Watanabe; Yuta Iwashita; Tatsuki Yoshino; Hayato Goto; Hiroyasu Tamakawa; Naoki Fujisaka; Akio Hashimoto; Kotaro Mizumachi
Women	South Korea; Lee Hye-won; Lee Won-jung; Lee Yeong-yeong; Ryu Eun-hee; Jeong Jin-hui; Park Sae-young; Han Mi-seul; Kang Eun-hye; Jo Eun-been; Kim So-ra; Woo Bit-na; Gwon Han-na; Cha Seo-yeon; Jeon Ji-yeon; Gim Bo-eun; Kim Min-seo	Japan; Miyako Hatsumi; Arisa Kinjo; Kaho Nakayama; Naoko Sahara; Kaoru Wada; Natsuki Aizawa; Asuka Fujita; Sakura Kametani; Haruno Sasaki; Minami Matsuura; Clare Gray; Yuki Yoshidome; Ai Nakao; Aki Ueshima; Kaede Higa; Sora Ishikawa	China; Lu Chang; Pan Fengying; Liang Jing; Jiang Xintong; Shi Zihan; Liu Chan; Li Xiaoqing; Yang Yue; Huang Sitong; Hou Changqing; Zhang Pingping; Yuan Lingjie; Qu Wenna; Liu Xuedan; Zheng Yun; Liu Yuting

== Draw ==
The draw for the competition was held on 23 July 2026.

=== Men ===
Nine teams were divided into a group of five and a group of four. The teams were seeded based on their final ranking at the 2026 Asian Men's Handball Championship (with the exception of Kazakhstan, who did not qualify).

Group A

- Qatar
- Japan (hosts)
- China
- Hong Kong

Group B

- Bahrain
- Kuwait
- South Korea
- Iran
- Kazakhstan

=== Women ===
Seven teams were placed in one group. The teams were seeded based on their final ranking at the 2024 Asian Women's Handball Championship (with the exceptions of Uzbekistan, who withdrew, and Vietnam, who did not qualify).

Group

- Japan (hosts)
- South Korea
- Kazakhstan
- China
- Hong Kong
- Uzbekistan
- Vietnam
