= Natsumi Aizawa =

Japanese handball player

Natsuki Aizawa
Personal information
- Nationality: Japanese
- Born: 6 January 1999 (age 27) Ibaraki Prefecture, Japan
- Height: 160 cm (5 ft 3 in)

Sport
- Sport: Handball
- Position: Centre back
- Current club: Thüringer HC
- Number: 23

Senior clubs
- Years: Team
- 2020–2024: Hokkoku Bank Honey Bee
- 2024–: Thüringer HC
National team
- Years: Team
- –: Japan
Medal record
Women's handball
Representing Japan
Asian Games
Gold medal – first place	2022 Hangzhou	Team
Silver medal – second place	2026 Aichi–Nagoya	Team

Natsuki Aizawa (Japanese: 相澤 菜月, Aizawa Natsuki; born 6 January 1999) is a Japanese handball player who plays as a centre back for German club Thüringer HC and the Japan women's national handball team. She previously played for Hokkoku Bank Honey Bee in Japan's domestic league. Aizawa has won gold and silver medals in women's handball at the Asian Games, and helped Thüringer HC win the EHF European League in the 2024–25 season.

== Career ==
Aizawa was born in Ibaraki Prefecture, Japan, and attended Osaka University of Health and Sport Sciences. She joined Hokkoku Bank Honey Bee in 2020 after completing her university studies. Playing as a centre back, she became an important player for the team and competed in Japan's domestic handball competitions.

During the 2021–22 Japan Handball League season, Aizawa was named the league's regular-season Most Valuable Player. She also finished as the league's leading scorer, with 117 goals, and led the competition in goals from seven-metre throws. These performances established her as one of the leading players in the domestic women's league.

Aizawa also helped Hokkoku Bank win the All-Japan Women's Handball Championship. She was named the tournament's Most Valuable Player after the team's victory in January 2022. The club subsequently won the 2023 edition of the championship, with Aizawa again receiving the individual Most Valuable Player award.

Aizawa represented Japan at the 2022 Asian Games, held in Hangzhou in 2023 because of the COVID-19 pandemic. Japan won the gold medal in the women's handball tournament, making Aizawa an Asian Games champion.

In the 2024–25 season, Aizawa moved to Germany to join Thüringer HC, competing in the Bundesliga and European club competitions. The club described her as a key player when it announced a contract extension in October 2025, confirming that she would remain with the team for a further two years.

Aizawa helped Thüringer HC win the EHF European League in the 2024–25 season. In the following season, the club reached the 2025–26 final but lost to Dijon Handball, finishing as runners-up. During the 2025–26 campaign, Aizawa contributed in both scoring and playmaking roles, including in the quarter-final against Nykøbing Falster Håndbold, where she recorded four goals and four assists in the first leg and seven goals and four assists in the second leg.

Aizawa was selected for Japan's women's national team for the 2026 Asian Games in Aichi and Nagoya. Japan reached the final and won the silver medal, adding to the gold medal she had earned at the previous Asian Games.
