= Handball at the 2026 Asian Games – Women's tournament =

Women's handball at the 2026 Asian Games
- Venues: Kasugai City Gymnasium; Toyoda Gosei Memorial Gymnasium
- Dates: 19–27 September 2026
- Competitors: 109 from 7 nations

Medalists
gold medal	South Korea
silver medal	Japan
bronze medal	China

The women's handball tournament at the 2026 Asian Games was held in Inazawa and Kasugai, Japan from 19 to 27 September 2026.

== Rosters ==
China	Hong Kong	Japan	Kazakhstan
Lu Chang; Pan Fengying; Liang Jing; Jiang Xintong; Shi Zihan; Liu Chan; Li Xiaoqing; Yang Yue; Huang Sitong; Hou Changqing; Zhang Pingping; Yuan Lingjie; Qu Wenna; Liu Xuedan; Zheng Yun; Liu Yuting	Chan Kam Ling; Sze Yan Yee; Chong Sze Kei; Cheung Man Shan; Hung Cheuk Kiu; Yeung Chun Yan; Tsang Yuen Lam; Wu Lei Ling; Liu Ho Ching; Hung Sin Yu; Tai Tsz Yee; Lo Kei Laam; Wong Yee Ting; Cheung Mei Ngo; Fung Sze Ming; Yiu Hei Yan	Miyako Hatsumi; Arisa Kinjo; Kaho Nakayama; Naoko Sahara; Kaoru Wada; Natsuki Aizawa; Asuka Fujita; Sakura Kametani; Haruno Sasaki; Minami Matsuura; Clare Gray; Yuki Yoshidome; Ai Nakao; Aki Ueshima; Kaede Higa; Sora Ishikawa	Damira Zhaparova; Mariya Sitnikova; Sevara Rejemetova; Aiym Tursyn; Aida Zhaparova; Veronika Khardina; Kristina Radayeva; Zlata Zvyagina; Zhannat Aitenova; Arailym Abdikhamit; Irina Khassakhanova; Zhanerke Seitkassym; Madina Myrzamseiitova; Kristina Stepanova; Zhanerke Kuandykova
South Korea	Uzbekistan	Vietnam	
Lee Hye-won; Lee Won-jung; Lee Yeong-yeong; Ryu Eun-hee; Jeong Jin-hui; Park Sae-young; Han Mi-seul; Kang Eun-hye; Jo Eun-been; Kim So-ra; Woo Bit-na; Gwon Han-na; Cha Seo-yeon; Jeon Ji-yeon; Gim Bo-eun; Kim Min-seo	Sarbinaz Saparbaeva; Mukaddas Juraeva; Shalola Keldiyorova; Sabina Mullaeva; Ruksshona Ruzieva; Dilnoza Sultanova; Turoyim Mamirova; Ilmira Bayjanova; Khusniya Safarova; Anastasiya Khudoyarova; Nilufar Yusufova; Zulaykho Marimboeva; Zukhra Botirova; Anna Popovich	Nguyễn Thị Thanh Huyền; Huỳnh Gia Mỹ; Nguyễn Thị Diễm Quỳnh; Hà Thị Thu Huệ; Võ Bé Tư; Hà Thị Hạnh; Đàm Thị Thanh Huyền; Hoàng Thị Lan Anh; Nguyễn Thị Ánh Tuyết; Đỗ Thị Tú Hảo; Nguyễn Ngọc Thảo Vy; Trần Hải Yến; Phạm Thị Loan; Đỗ Thị Huyền Trang; Đỗ Thị Như Quỳnh; Phùng Thị Linh Trang	

== Results ==
All times are local, Japan Standard Time (UTC+9).

Pos	Team	Pld	W	D	L	GF	GA	GD	Pts
1st place, gold medalist(s)	South Korea	6	6	0	0	243	105	+138	12
2nd place, silver medalist(s)	Japan (H)	6	5	0	1	217	120	+97	10
3rd place, bronze medalist(s)	China	6	4	0	2	189	154	+35	8
4	Kazakhstan	6	3	0	3	164	187	−23	6
5	Uzbekistan	6	2	0	4	116	206	−90	4
6	Hong Kong	6	1	0	5	131	209	−78	2
7	Vietnam	6	0	0	6	128	207	−79	0

Source: asiangames2026.org
(H) Hosts

19 September 2026; 10:00	South Korea	48–16	Hong Kong	Toyoda Gosei Memorial Gymnasium; Referees: Mazaheri, Mozafari (IRI)
19 September 2026; 10:00	Lee W. 9	(25–9)	Chong 6	Toyoda Gosei Memorial Gymnasium; Referees: Mazaheri, Mozafari (IRI)
19 September 2026; 10:00		Report	1× (suspension)	Toyoda Gosei Memorial Gymnasium; Referees: Mazaheri, Mozafari (IRI)

19 September 2026; 10:00	Kazakhstan	24–34	China	Kasugai City Gymnasium; Referees: Lee, Lee (KOR)
19 September 2026; 10:00	Khassakhanova 9	(12–17)	Liu C. 4	Kasugai City Gymnasium; Referees: Lee, Lee (KOR)
19 September 2026; 10:00	2× (suspension)	Report	1× (yellow card) 2× (suspension)	Kasugai City Gymnasium; Referees: Lee, Lee (KOR)

19 September 2026; 12:00	Japan	40–14	Vietnam	Kasugai City Gymnasium; Referees: Allayarova, Razakbergenova (UZB)
19 September 2026; 12:00	Matsuura 10	(19–5)	Đàm 5	Kasugai City Gymnasium; Referees: Allayarova, Razakbergenova (UZB)
19 September 2026; 12:00	1× (suspension)	Report	1× (suspension)	Kasugai City Gymnasium; Referees: Allayarova, Razakbergenova (UZB)

20 September 2026; 13:30	South Korea	42–18	Kazakhstan	Kasugai City Gymnasium; Referees: Al-Enezi, Al-Naseem (KUW)
20 September 2026; 13:30	Woo 10	(18–8)	Khassakhanova 7	Kasugai City Gymnasium; Referees: Al-Enezi, Al-Naseem (KUW)
20 September 2026; 13:30	1× (suspension)	Report	2× (suspension) 2× (red card)	Kasugai City Gymnasium; Referees: Al-Enezi, Al-Naseem (KUW)

20 September 2026; 15:30	Vietnam	23–26	Hong Kong	Kasugai City Gymnasium; Referees: Mozafari, Mazaheri (IRI)
20 September 2026; 15:30	Phạm, Phùng 5	(9–11)	Wu 14	Kasugai City Gymnasium; Referees: Mozafari, Mazaheri (IRI)
20 September 2026; 15:30	1× (yellow card) 4× (suspension)	Report	2× (suspension)	Kasugai City Gymnasium; Referees: Mozafari, Mazaheri (IRI)

20 September 2026; 17:30	Japan	43–12	Uzbekistan	Kasugai City Gymnasium; Referees: Lee, Lee (KOR)
20 September 2026; 17:30	Matsuura 10	(17–7)	Saparbaeva 5	Kasugai City Gymnasium; Referees: Lee, Lee (KOR)
20 September 2026; 17:30	2× (suspension)	Report	3× (suspension)	Kasugai City Gymnasium; Referees: Lee, Lee (KOR)

22 September 2026; 13:30	Vietnam	25–29	Kazakhstan	Kasugai City Gymnasium; Referees: Lee, Lee (KOR)
22 September 2026; 13:30	Nguyễn T.A. 8	(14–14)	Seitkassym, Zhaparova 6	Kasugai City Gymnasium; Referees: Lee, Lee (KOR)
22 September 2026; 13:30	4× (suspension)	Report	1× (suspension)	Kasugai City Gymnasium; Referees: Lee, Lee (KOR)

22 September 2026; 15:30	Hong Kong	16–39	Japan	Kasugai City Gymnasium; Referees: Razakbergenova, Allayarova (UZB)
22 September 2026; 15:30	Chong, Hung 4	(8–18)	Wada 7	Kasugai City Gymnasium; Referees: Razakbergenova, Allayarova (UZB)
22 September 2026; 15:30	1× (suspension)	Report	1× (suspension)	Kasugai City Gymnasium; Referees: Razakbergenova, Allayarova (UZB)

22 September 2026; 17:30	Uzbekistan	14–37	China	Kasugai City Gymnasium; Referees: Gheisarian, Gheisarian (IRI)
22 September 2026; 17:30	Saparbaeva 4	(6–18)	Liang 7	Kasugai City Gymnasium; Referees: Gheisarian, Gheisarian (IRI)
22 September 2026; 17:30	2× (suspension)	Report	4× (suspension)	Kasugai City Gymnasium; Referees: Gheisarian, Gheisarian (IRI)

23 September 2026; 13:30	Hong Kong	27–34	Kazakhstan	Kasugai City Gymnasium; Referees: Usui, Kawai (JPN)
23 September 2026; 13:30	Wong 6	(13–21)	Khassakhanova 8	Kasugai City Gymnasium; Referees: Usui, Kawai (JPN)
23 September 2026; 13:30	1× (suspension)	Report	2× (suspension)	Kasugai City Gymnasium; Referees: Usui, Kawai (JPN)

23 September 2026; 15:30	Uzbekistan	13–43	South Korea	Kasugai City Gymnasium; Referees: Abo, Al-Rashed (JOR)
23 September 2026; 15:30	Saparbaeva 5	(8–22)	Joo 7	Kasugai City Gymnasium; Referees: Abo, Al-Rashed (JOR)
23 September 2026; 15:30	3× (suspension)	Report	3× (suspension)	Kasugai City Gymnasium; Referees: Abo, Al-Rashed (JOR)

23 September 2026; 17:30	China	27–33	Japan	Kasugai City Gymnasium; Referees: Mohamed, Al-Aradi (BHR)
23 September 2026; 17:30	Liu C. 9	(16–18)	Aizawa 6	Kasugai City Gymnasium; Referees: Mohamed, Al-Aradi (BHR)
23 September 2026; 17:30	1× (yellow card) 3× (suspension)	Report	1× (suspension)	Kasugai City Gymnasium; Referees: Mohamed, Al-Aradi (BHR)

25 September 2026; 12:30	Vietnam	21–29	Uzbekistan	Toyoda Gosei Memorial Gymnasium; Referees: Cha, Pak (KOR)
25 September 2026; 12:30	Phùng 5	(13–15)	Mullaeva 8	Toyoda Gosei Memorial Gymnasium; Referees: Cha, Pak (KOR)
25 September 2026; 12:30	2× (suspension)	Report	5× (suspension)	Toyoda Gosei Memorial Gymnasium; Referees: Cha, Pak (KOR)

25 September 2026; 15:00	Kazakhstan	24–39	Japan	Toyoda Gosei Memorial Gymnasium; Referees: Mozafari, Mazaheri (IRI)
25 September 2026; 15:00	Abdikhamit 5	(12–15)	Aizawa 7	Toyoda Gosei Memorial Gymnasium; Referees: Mozafari, Mazaheri (IRI)
25 September 2026; 15:00	2× (suspension)	Report	2× (suspension)	Toyoda Gosei Memorial Gymnasium; Referees: Mozafari, Mazaheri (IRI)

25 September 2026; 17:30	South Korea	37–17	China	Toyoda Gosei Memorial Gymnasium; Referees: Al-Enezi, Al-Naseem (KUW)
25 September 2026; 17:30	Kwon, Lee Y. 5	(19–8)	Liu X. 5	Toyoda Gosei Memorial Gymnasium; Referees: Al-Enezi, Al-Naseem (KUW)
25 September 2026; 17:30	3× (suspension)	Report	5× (suspension)	Toyoda Gosei Memorial Gymnasium; Referees: Al-Enezi, Al-Naseem (KUW)

26 September 2026; 12:30	Kazakhstan	35–20	Uzbekistan	Toyoda Gosei Memorial Gymnasium; Referees: Lee, Lee (KOR)
26 September 2026; 12:30	three players 6	(15–9)	Ruzieva 5	Toyoda Gosei Memorial Gymnasium; Referees: Lee, Lee (KOR)
26 September 2026; 12:30	4× (suspension)	Report	3× (suspension)	Toyoda Gosei Memorial Gymnasium; Referees: Lee, Lee (KOR)

26 September 2026; 15:00	China	37–19	Hong Kong	Toyoda Gosei Memorial Gymnasium; Referees: Razakbergenova, Allayarova (UZB)
26 September 2026; 15:00	Shi 8	(19–11)	Chong 4	Toyoda Gosei Memorial Gymnasium; Referees: Razakbergenova, Allayarova (UZB)
26 September 2026; 15:00	2× (suspension)	Report	2× (suspension)	Toyoda Gosei Memorial Gymnasium; Referees: Razakbergenova, Allayarova (UZB)

26 September 2026; 17:30	South Korea	46–18	Vietnam	Toyoda Gosei Memorial Gymnasium; Referees: Abo, Al-Rashed (JOR)
26 September 2026; 17:30	Jo 8	(22–9)	Nguyễn T.A. 10	Toyoda Gosei Memorial Gymnasium; Referees: Abo, Al-Rashed (JOR)
26 September 2026; 17:30	1× (suspension)	Report	5× (suspension) 1× (red card)	Toyoda Gosei Memorial Gymnasium; Referees: Abo, Al-Rashed (JOR)

27 September 2026; 13:00	Uzbekistan	28–27	Hong Kong	Toyoda Gosei Memorial Gymnasium; Referees: Mozafarivanani, Mazaheri (IRI)
27 September 2026; 13:00	Mullaeva, Safarova 5	(11–14)	Wong 7	Toyoda Gosei Memorial Gymnasium; Referees: Mozafarivanani, Mazaheri (IRI)
27 September 2026; 13:00	2× (suspension)	Report	3× (suspension)	Toyoda Gosei Memorial Gymnasium; Referees: Mozafarivanani, Mazaheri (IRI)

27 September 2026; 15:30	China	37–27	Vietnam	Toyoda Gosei Memorial Gymnasium; Referees: Razakbergenova, Allayarova (UZB)
27 September 2026; 15:30	Qu 7	(17–13)	Nguyễn T.A. 10	Toyoda Gosei Memorial Gymnasium; Referees: Razakbergenova, Allayarova (UZB)
27 September 2026; 15:30		Report		Toyoda Gosei Memorial Gymnasium; Referees: Razakbergenova, Allayarova (UZB)

27 September 2026; 18:00	Japan	23–27	South Korea	Toyoda Gosei Memorial Gymnasium; Referees: Al-Enezi, Al-Naseem (KUW)
27 September 2026; 18:00	Gray 6	(12–16)	Kwon 7	Toyoda Gosei Memorial Gymnasium; Referees: Al-Enezi, Al-Naseem (KUW)
27 September 2026; 18:00	1× (suspension)	Report	1× (yellow card) 5× (suspension) 1× (red card)	Toyoda Gosei Memorial Gymnasium; Referees: Al-Enezi, Al-Naseem (KUW)
