= Arailym Abdikhamit =

Kazakhstani handball player

Personal information
- Nationality: Kazakhstani
- Born: 3 March 1999 (age 27)
- Height: 1.95 m (6 ft 5 in)

Sport
- Sport: Handball
- Position: Pivot
- Current club: Kazygurt Handball
National team
Years	Team	Apps	(Gls)
–	Kazakhstan	42	(70)
Medal record
Asian Championship
Bronze medal – third place	2024 India

Arailym Abdikhamit (born 3 March 1999) is a Kazakhstani handball player for Kazygurt Handball and the Kazakhstani national team.

She competed at the 2015 World Women's Handball Championship in Denmark.
