= Gwon Han-na =

South Korean handball player (born 1989)

Gwon Han-Na
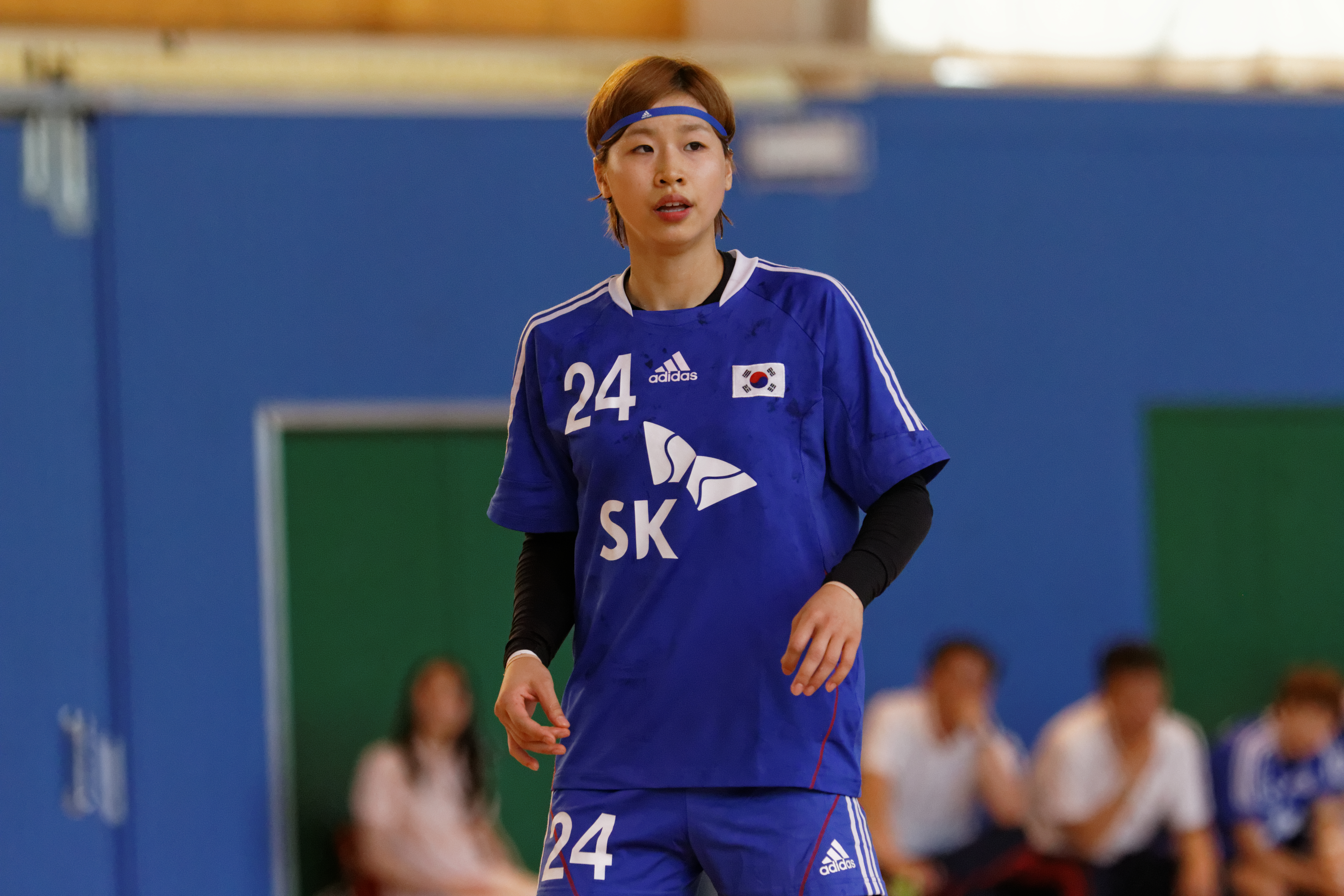

Personal information
- Nationality: South Korean
- Born: 22 November 1989 (age 36) Seoul, South Korea
- Height: 1.73 m (5 ft 8 in)

Sport
- Sport: Handball
- Position: Centre back
- Current club: Busan

Senior clubs
- Years: Team
- –: Seoul City Hall
- –: Busan Infrastructure Corporation
- –: SK Sugar Gliders
- –: Seoul City Hall
- –: Busan Infrastructure Corporation
National team
Years	Team	Apps	(Gls)
–	South Korea	77	(211)
Medal record
Women's handball
Representing South Korea
Asian Games
Gold medal – first place	2014 Incheon	Team
Gold medal – first place	2026 Aichi–Nagoya	Team
World University Games
Silver medal – second place	2015 Gwangju	Team

Korean name
- Hangul: 권한나
- Hanja: 權韓娜
- RR: Gwon Hanna
- MR: Kwŏn Hanna

Gwon Han-Na (born 22 November 1989) is a South Korean handball player for Busan and the South Korean national team.

She competed for the South Korean team at the 2012 Summer Olympics in London.

She holds the record for the most goals in the South Korean Handball League with over 1500 (as of 2026).
