= Kaede Higa =

Japanese handball player (born 2003)

Personal information
- Nationality: Japanese
- Born: 27 August 2003 (age 23) Okinawa Prefecture, Japan
- Height: 170 cm (67 in)

Sport
- Sport: Handball
- Position: Goalkeeper
- Current club: Kagawa Bank GiraSol Kagawa

Senior clubs
- Years: Team
- –: Kagawa Bank GiraSol Kagawa
National team
- Years: Team
- –: Japan
Medal record
Women's handball
Representing Japan
Asian Games
Silver medal – second place	2026 Aichi–Nagoya	Team

Kaede Higa (Japanese: 比嘉 楓; born 27 August 2003) is a Japanese handball player who plays as a goalkeeper for Kagawa Bank GiraSol Kagawa and the Japan women's national handball team. She represented Japan at the 2026 Asian Games, where the team won the silver medal. Higa previously played collegiate handball for Osaka University of Health and Sport Sciences, where she received individual recognition in the Kansai student league.

== Career ==
Higa was born on 27 August 2003 in Okinawa Prefecture, Japan. Influenced by her older sister, she began playing handball in the second grade of elementary school and became a goalkeeper in the fourth grade. She attended Naha Nishi High School, where she helped the team finish as runners-up at the All Japan High School Athletic Championships. During her school years, she was selected for Japan's under-16 and under-18 national teams.

Higa enrolled at Osaka University of Health and Sport Sciences, where she played for the university's women's handball team. She became the team's first-choice goalkeeper and contributed to its success in collegiate competitions. In August 2023, the university won both the men's and women's titles at the West Japan Intercollegiate Handball Championship. Higa was named among the women's tournament's outstanding players.

In August 2024, Higa was again recognised among the outstanding players at the West Japan Intercollegiate Handball Championship, as Osaka University of Health and Sport Sciences won both the men's and women's competitions for a second consecutive year. Her performances established her as one of the leading goalkeepers in university handball.

In May 2025, Higa was named the most valuable player of the Kansai Collegiate Women's Spring League. Osaka University of Health and Sport Sciences completed the league with a perfect record of nine wins, securing its 22nd consecutive title. Higa played as goalkeeper and helped the team maintain its strong defensive record.

After graduating from university, Higa joined Kagawa Bank GiraSol Kagawa, a Japanese women's handball club. She continued her career in the domestic league while pursuing selection for Japan's senior national team. Her club and national-team profiles list her as a goalkeeper and give her height as 170 centimetres.

Higa was selected for Japan's women's national team for the 2026 Asian Games in Aichi and Nagoya. The Japanese team won its first five matches in the women's handball tournament before facing South Korea in the final round-robin match on 27 September. Japan lost 23–27 and finished second with five wins and one defeat, earning the silver medal. The Japan Handball Association confirmed the team's final standing and medal, while the Asian Handball Federation's tournament records list Japan as the runner-up.
