= Kim So-ra =

South Korean handball player (born 1998)

Personal information
- Nationality: South Korean
- Born: 18 July 1998 (age 28)
- Height: 1.80 m (5 ft 11 in)

Sport
- Sport: Handball
- Position: Pivot
- Current club: Gyeongnam Development Corp.

Senior clubs
- Years: Team
- -2021: Korea National Sport University
- 2021-: Gyeongnam Development Corp.
National team
Years	Team	Apps	(Gls)
–	South Korea	8	(5)
Medal record
Women's handball
Representing South Korea
Asian Games
Gold medal – first place	2026 Aichi–Nagoya	Team
Asian Championship
Gold medal – first place	2021 Jordan
Gold medal – first place	2022 South Korea
Junior World Championship
Bronze medal – third place	2018 Hungary
Asian Junior Championship
Gold medal – first place	2017 Hong Kong
Youth World Championship
Bronze medal – third place	2016 Slovakia
Asian Youth Championship
Gold medal – first place	2015 India

Kim So-ra (Korean: 김소라; born 18 July 1998) is a South Korean handball player for the club Gyeongnam Development Corp. and for the South Korean national team.

She participated at the 2017 World Women's Handball Championship and at the 2019 World Women's Handball Championship.
