= Kaoru Wada (handballer) =

Japanese handball player

Personal information
- Nationality: Japanese
- Born: 8 May 2001 (age 25) Nara Prefecture, Japan
- Height: 169 cm (5 ft 7 in)

Sport
- Sport: Handball
- Position: Left wing
- Current club: Kagawa Bank GiraSol Kagawa
Medal record
Women's handball
Representing Japan
Asian Games
Silver medal – second place	2026 Aichi–Nagoya	Team

Kaoru Wada (Japanese: 和田 薫, Wada Kaoru; born 8 May 2001) is a Japanese handball player who plays as a left wing for Kagawa Bank GiraSol Kagawa and the Japan women's national handball team. She won a silver medal with Japan at the 2026 Asian Games.

== Career ==
Wada attended Osaka University of Health and Sport Sciences, where she competed in collegiate handball. She was part of the university team that won the All Japan Intercollegiate Handball Championship in 2022 and 2023. She received a special award in 2022 and an outstanding-player award in 2023.

Wada joined Kagawa Bank GiraSol Kagawa in 2024. She plays as a left wing in Japan's domestic handball competitions.

Wada represented Japan in the women's handball tournament at the 2026 Asian Games in Aichi and Nagoya. Japan advanced to the final and won the silver medal after losing to South Korea.

In February 2026, Kagawa Bank GiraSol Kagawa received the Kagawa Sports Award following its victory in the adult women's handball competition at the National Sports Festival. Wada was part of the team during this period.
