= Michaela Malá =

Czech handball player

Personal information
- Nationality: Czech
- Born: 12 January 2003 (age 23) Plzeň, Czech Republic
- Height: 1.76 m (5 ft 9 in)

Sport
- Sport: Handball
- Position: Goalkeeper
- Current club: DHC Slavia Prague
- Number: 27

Senior clubs
- Years: Team
- 2021-2022: DHC Plzeň
- 2022-: DHC Slavia Prague
National team
Years	Team	Apps	(Gls)
2021–	Czech Republic	0	(0)

Michaela Malá (born 12 January 2003) is a Czech handballer for DHC Slavia Prague and the Czech national team.

She participated at the 2021 World Women's Handball Championship in Spain, placing 19th.
