= Ai Nakao =

Japanese handball player

Personal information
- Nationality: Japanese
- Born: 27 February 2006 (age 20) Kyoto Prefecture, Japan
- Education: Osaka University of Health and Sport Sciences
- Height: 175 cm (5 ft 9 in)

Sport
- Sport: Handball
- Position: Left back
- Club: Blue Sakuya Kagoshima
Medal record
Women's handball
Representing Japan
Asian Games
Silver medal – second place	2026 Aichi–Nagoya	Team

Ai Nakao (Japanese: 中尾 藍; born 27 February 2006) is a Japanese handball player who plays as a left back. She represents Osaka University of Health and Sport Sciences in collegiate handball and has been selected for the Japan women's national handball team. Nakao represented Japan at the 2026 Asian Games, where the team won the silver medal in the women's handball tournament. She previously captained Japan's under-18 and under-20 national teams.

== Career ==
Nakao was born on 27 February 2006 in Kyoto Prefecture, Japan. She attended Kyoto Prefectural Rakuhoku High School and began playing handball in the fifth grade of elementary school. She later enrolled at Osaka University of Health and Sport Sciences, where she joined the women's handball team. She said that she chose the university because of its strong sporting environment and the opportunity to work towards her goal of becoming a member of Japan's senior national team.

During her high-school years, Nakao was selected for Japan's under-18 national team and served as its captain. She was subsequently named captain of the under-20 team, continuing her development in international youth handball. Her selection for both age-group teams provided experience in international competition before she entered the senior national-team programme.

At Osaka University of Health and Sport Sciences, Nakao became part of one of Japan's leading university handball programmes. In November 2025, she received an Outstanding Player Award at the All Japan Intercollegiate Handball Championship. The women's team won the national championship, defeating Tsukuba University in the final to secure its 12th consecutive title and 13th overall.

In April 2026, Nakao was selected for Japan's first overseas training tour of the year. The Japan Handball Association listed her as a left back, with a height of 175 cm, and identified her as a player for Osaka University of Health and Sport Sciences. The selection marked a step in her progression from the youth national teams to the senior squad.

In July 2026, Nakao was named to Japan's women's handball squad for the Aichi–Nagoya Asian Games. Japan began the tournament with victories over Vietnam and Uzbekistan and continued through the group stage to reach the medal round. Japan ultimately finished second in the women's competition, winning the silver medal.
