= Vilma Matthijs Holmberg =

Swedish handball player (born 1999)

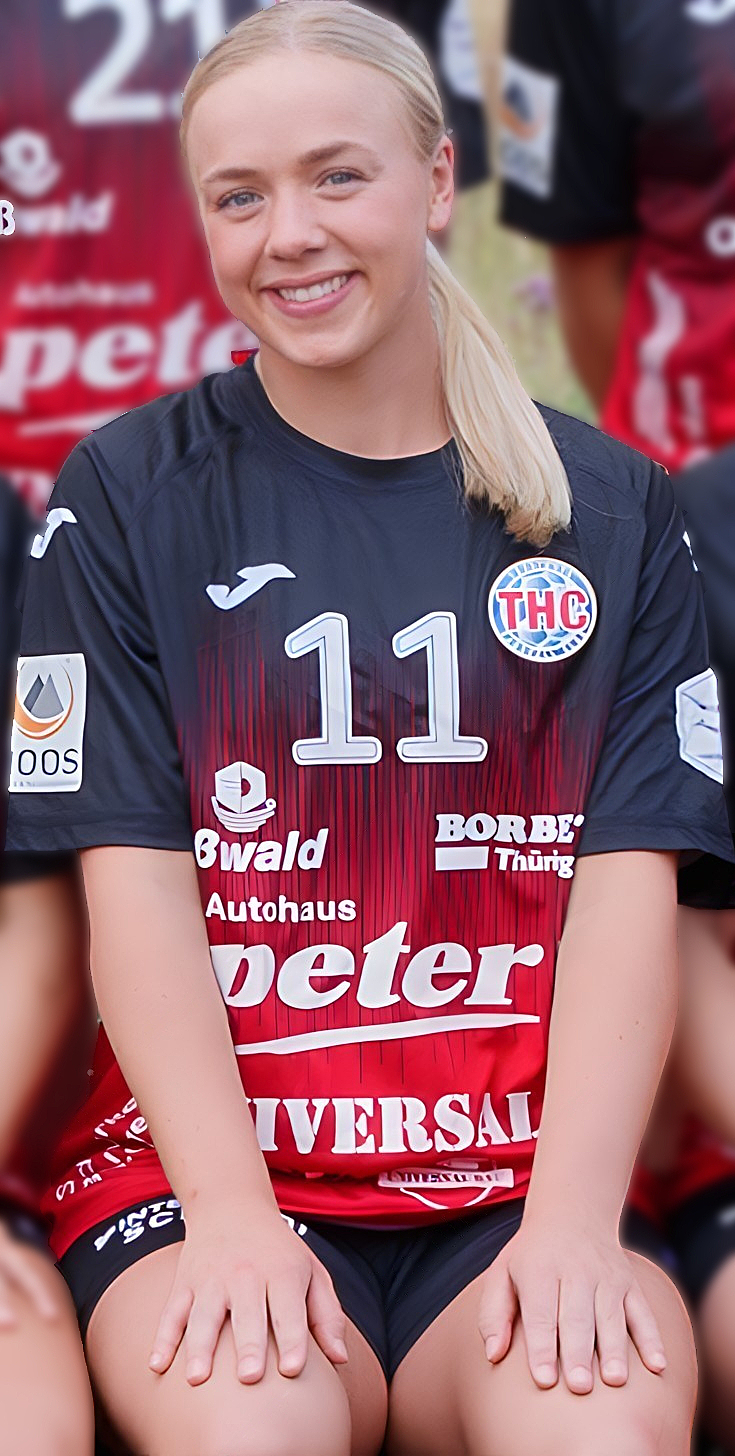

Personal information
- Full name: Vilma Matthijs Holmberg (2022)
- Nationality: Swedish
- Born: 25 February 1999 (age 27) Stockholm, Sweden
- Height: 1.75 m (5 ft 9 in)

Sport
- Sport: Handball
- Position: Line player
- Current club: Thüringer HC
- Number: 11

Youth career
- Years: Team
- –: KFUM Ulricehamn

Senior clubs
- Years: Team
- 2015–2018: Tyresö Handball
- 2018–2022: Skuru IK
- 2022–2024: Thüringer HC
- 2024–: Chambray Touraine Handball
National team
Years	Team	Apps	(Gls)
2021–	Sweden	13	(4)
- Updated on 25 July 2025

Vilma Matthijs Holmberg (born 25 February 1999) is a Swedish handball player who plays for Chambray Touraine Handball in France and for the Swedish national team.

She represented Sweden at the 2021 World Handball Championship.

== Achievements ==
- Svensk handbollselit:
  - Winner: 2021
  - Silver Medalist: 2019
- Swedish Handball Cup:
  - Winner: 2022
