= Mariya Sitnikova =

Kazakhstani handball player

Personal information
- Nationality: Kazakhstani
- Born: 10 November 1998 (age 27)
- Height: 1.65 m (5 ft 5 in)

Sport
- Sport: Handball
- Position: Left back
- Current club: Handball Club Turan
- Number: '

Senior clubs
- Years: Team
- –: Kazygurt Handball
- –: Handball Club Turan
National team
Years	Team	Apps	(Gls)
–	Kazakhstan	37	(62)
Medal record
Asian Championship
Bronze medal – third place	2024 India
- Updated on 27 November 2025

Mariya Sitnikova (born 10 November 1998) is a Kazakhstani handball player for Handball Club Turan and the Kazakhstani national team.

She represented Kazakhstan at the 2019 World Women's Handball Championship.
