= Zhannat Aitenova =

Kazakhstani handball player

Personal information
- Nationality: Kazakhstani
- Born: November 5, 1989 (age 36)
- Height: 1.80 m (5 ft 11 in)

Sport
- Sport: Handball
- Position: Goalkeeper
- Current club: Kaysar Club

Senior clubs
- Years: Team
- –: Seihun-Kam
- –: Kaysar Club
National team
Years	Team	Apps	(Gls)
–	Kazakhstan	120	(4)
Medal record
Asian Championship
Bronze medal – third place	2024 India
- Updated on 27 November 2025

Zhannat Aitenova (born 1989) is a handball player for Kaysar Club and the Kazakhstani national team.

She played at the 2007 World Women's Handball Championship, which was Kazakhstan's first ever participation at a world championship. They finished 18th of 24. She participated at the 2011 World Women's Handball Championship in Brazil.
