= Minami Matsuura =

Japanese handball player

Personal information
- Native name: Japanese: 松浦 未南
- Nationality: Japanese
- Born: 26 January 2002 (age 24) Yamaguchi Prefecture, Japan
- Occupation: Handball player
- Height: 158 cm (5 ft 2 in)

Sport
- Sport: Handball
- Position: Backcourt player
- Club: Kagawa Bank GiraSol Kagawa
Medal record
Women's handball
Representing Japan
Asian Games
Silver medal – second place	2026 Aichi–Nagoya	Team

Minami Matsuura (Japanese: 松浦 未南, Matsuura Minami; born 26 January 2002) is a Japanese handball player who plays for Kagawa Bank GiraSol Kagawa and represents Japan in international competition. She was a member of the Japan women's national handball team that won the silver medal at the 2026 Asian Games in Aichi and Nagoya, Japan.

== Career ==
Matsuura attended Osaka University of Health and Sport Sciences, where she played collegiate handball. In 2022, she was part of the university team that won the All Japan Intercollegiate Handball Championship, and she received an individual outstanding-player award in connection with the team's victory.

After graduating, Matsuura joined Kagawa Bank GiraSol Kagawa in 2024. The team competes in Japan's top-level domestic handball league. She plays in the backcourt and has been used in central attacking roles. Her move to Kagawa Bank followed her university career at Osaka University of Health and Sport Sciences.

Matsuura became a member of Japan's senior women's national team. At the 2026 Asian Games, she helped Japan reach the women's handball final. Japan lost to South Korea in the final and finished with the silver medal. During the preliminary-round match against Vietnam on 19 September, Matsuura scored 10 goals, the highest individual total in the match, as Japan won 40–14.

In domestic competition, Matsuura was part of the Kagawa Bank GiraSol Kagawa team that won the women's League H playoff final in 2026. She scored eight goals in the final against Blue Sakuya Kagoshima and was named player of the match.
