= Clare Gray =

Japanese handball player (born 1997)

Personal information
- Full name: Clare Francis Gray
- Nationality: Japanese
- Born: 3 June 1997 (age 29) Fujisawa, Japan
- Height: 1.71 m (5 ft 7 in)

Sport
- Sport: Handball
- Position: Line player
- Current club: Omron Corporation
National team
Years	Team	Apps	(Gls)
2021–	Japan	0	(0)
Medal record
Women's handball
Representing Japan
Asian Games
Silver medal – second place	2026 Aichi–Nagoya	Team
Asian Championship
Gold medal – first place	2024 India

Clare Francis Gray (born 3 June 1997) is a Japanese female handball player for Omron Corporation and the Japanese national team.

She represented Japan at the 2021 World Women's Handball Championship in Spain.

At the 2024 Asian Championship she won gold medals with the Japanese team.
