= Naoko Sahara =

Japanese handball player (born 1996)

Personal information
- Nationality: Japanese
- Born: 18 January 1996 (age 30)
- Height: 1.80 m (5 ft 11 in)

Sport
- Sport: Handball
- Position: Line player
- Current club: Hokkoku Bank
- Number: 13
National team
Years	Team	Apps	(Gls)
2021-	Japan	31	(44)
Medal record
Women's handball
Representing Japan
Asian Games
Gold medal – first place	2022 Hangzhou	Team
Silver medal – second place	2026 Aichi–Nagoya	Team
Asian Championship
Silver medal – second place	2022 South Korea
- Updated on 27 November 2025

Naoko Sahara (born 18 January 1996) is a Japanese female handball player for Hokkoku Bank and the Japanese national team.

She represented Japan at the 2021 World Women's Handball Championship in Spain. She represented Japan again at the 2025 World Championship.

At the 2022 Asian Championship, she won silver medals, losing to South Korea in the final. At this occasion she was chosen for the tournament MVP.
