= Miyako Hatsumi =

Japanese handball player

Personal information
- Nationality: Japanese
- Born: 10 September 1997 (age 29) Kanagawa Prefecture, Japan
- Height: 165 cm (65 in)

Sport
- Sport: Handball
- Position: Pivot
- Current club: Mie Violet Iris
Medal record
Women's handball
Representing Japan
Asian Games
Gold medal – first place	2022 Hangzhou	Team
Silver medal – second place	2026 Aichi–Nagoya	Team

Miyako Hatsumi (Japanese: 初見 実椰子, Hatsumi Miyako; born 10 September 1997) is a Japanese handball player who plays as a pivot for Mie Violet Iris and the Japan women's national handball team. She won gold and silver medals with Japan at the Asian Games in 2022 and 2026, respectively. She has also represented Japan at the World Women's Handball Championship and the Asian Women's Handball Championship.

== Career ==
Hatsumi attended Kosei Gakuen Girls' High School before studying at Tokyo Women's College of Physical Education, where she played collegiate handball. After graduating, she joined Sony Semiconductor Manufacturing, continuing her handball career in Japan's corporate club system. She later joined Mie Violet Iris, competing in Japan's domestic women's handball league. She has played primarily as a pivot and has also been used as a left wing and backcourt player.

Hatsumi made her debut for Japan's senior women's national team in a Japan–South Korea international series in 2022. Her versatility in attack and defensive work led to further national-team selections. She represented Japan at the 2022 Asian Women's Handball Championship and the 2022 Asian Games, held in Hangzhou in 2023 because of the COVID-19 pandemic. Japan won the gold medal in the women's handball tournament, defeating South Korea in the final.

Hatsumi competed at the 2023 World Women's Handball Championship and the 2024 Asian Women's Handball Championship as a member of Japan's national team. She was selected again for the 2025 World Women's Handball Championship, held in Germany and the Netherlands. Japan played in the preliminary-round group alongside Denmark, Romania and Croatia.

At the 2026 Asian Games in Aichi and Nagoya, Hatsumi played for Japan in the women's handball tournament. Japan won its first five matches before facing South Korea in the final round on 27 September. South Korea won 27–23, leaving Japan with the silver medal. The result gave Japan medals at two consecutive Asian Games, following its gold-medal victory in 2022. In the final match against South Korea on 27 September 2026, Hatsumi made her 50th international appearance for Japan. She had made her senior international debut in 2022 and was used in several positions during the Asian Games, including as a pivot and in defensive formations.
