= Yuki Yoshidome =

Japanese handball player (born 1998)

Personal information
- Full name: Yuki Yoshidome
- Nationality: Japanese
- Born: 2 August 1998 (age 28)
- Height: 1.64 m (5 ft 5 in)

Sport
- Sport: Handball
- Position: Left wing
- Current club: Hokkoku Bank
- Number: 17
National team
Years	Team	Apps	(Gls)
2021–	Japan	38	(83)
Medal record
Women's handball
Representing Japan
Asian Games
Gold medal – first place	2022 Hangzhou	Team
Silver medal – second place	2026 Aichi–Nagoya	Team
Asian Championship
Gold medal – first place	2024 India
Silver medal – second place	2022 South Korea

Yuki Yoshidome (born 2 August 1998) is a Japanese female handball player for Hokkoku Bank and the Japanese national team.

She represented Japan at the 2021 World Women's Handball Championship in Spain. She represented Japan again at the 2025 World Championship.

At the 2022 Asian Championship, she won silver medals, losing to South Korea in the final.

At the 2024 Asian Championship she won a gold medal with the Japanese team.
