= Jeong Jin-hui =

South Korean handball player (born 1999)

Personal information
- Nationality: South Korean
- Born: 24 March 1999 (age 27)
- Height: 1.80 m (5 ft 11 in)

Sport
- Sport: Handball
- Position: Goalkeeper
- Current club: Seoul City Hall

Senior clubs
- Years: Team
- –: Korea National Sport University
- –: Seoul City Hall
National team
Years	Team	Apps	(Gls)
–	South Korea	28	(0)
Medal record
Women's handball
Representing South Korea
Asian Games
Gold medal – first place	2026 Aichi–Nagoya	Team
Silver medal – second place	2022 Hangzhou	Team
Asian Championship
Gold medal – first place	2022 South Korea

Korean name
- Hangul: 정진희
- RR: Jeong Jinhui
- MR: Chŏng Chinhŭi
- Updated on 27 November 2025

Jeong Jin-hui (Korean: 정진희; born 24 March 1999) is a South Korean handball player who plays as a goalkeeper for the club Seoul City Hall and for South Korea internationally. She made her Olympic debut representing South Korea at the 2020 Summer Olympics.

== Career ==
She participated at the 2017 World Women's Handball Championship where South Korea finished at 13th place. She was part of the national team which claimed bronze medal during the 2018 Women's Youth World Handball Championship where South Korea defeated Sweden 34–27 in the third-place match.

She was included in the South Korean squad in the women's handball competition for the 2020 Summer Olympics and the 2024 Summer Olympics, as well as the 2022 Asian Games where the team won a silver medal.

In 2025 she represented Korea at the 2025 World Women's Handball Championship.
