= Zhanerke Seitkassym =

Kazakhstani handball player

Personal information
- Nationality: Kazakhstani
- Born: 5 December 2002 (age 23)
- Height: 1.68 m (5 ft 6 in)

Sport
- Sport: Handball
- Position: Right back
- Current club: Kaysar Club
National team
Years	Team	Apps	(Gls)
–	Kazakhstan	52	(91)
Medal record
Asian Championship
Bronze medal – third place	2021 Jordan
Bronze medal – third place	2024 India
- Updated on 27 November 2025

Zhanerke Seitkassym (born 5 December 2002) is a Kazakhstani handball player for Kaysar Club and the Kazakhstani national team.

She represented Kazakhstan at the 2019 World Women's Handball Championship.
