= Sora Ishikawa =

Japanese handball player (born 2002)

Personal information
- Nationality: Japanese
- Born: 20 December 2002 (age 23) Ōita Prefecture, Japan
- Education: Osaka University of Health and Sport Sciences
- Height: 169 cm (5 ft 7 in)

Sport
- Sport: Handball
- Position: Right back
Medal record
Women's handball
Representing Japan
Asian Games
Gold medal – first place	2022 Hangzhou	Team
Silver medal – second place	2026 Aichi–Nagoya	Team

Sora Ishikawa (Japanese: 石川 空; born 20 December 2002) is a Japanese handball player who plays as a right back for Spanish club Super Amara Bera Bera and the Japan women's national team. She represented Japan at the Asian Games, winning gold at the 2022 Asian Games, held in Hangzhou in 2023, and silver at the 2026 Asian Games in Aichi–Nagoya. She has also represented Japan at the IHF Women's World Handball Championship.

== Career ==
Ishikawa was born on 20 December 2002 in Ōita Prefecture, Japan. She attended Ōita Tsurusaki High School before enrolling at Osaka University of Health and Sport Sciences. She played for the university's women's handball team and became a member of Japan's national team. Her performances at university level helped her progress to senior international competition.

Ishikawa represented Japan at the 2022 Asian Games, which were held in Hangzhou, China, from September to October 2023 after being postponed because of the COVID-19 pandemic. Japan won the women's handball tournament, earning the gold medal. The result was a significant achievement for the Japanese national team and marked Ishikawa's first Asian Games gold medal.

In March 2025, Ishikawa graduated from Osaka University of Health and Sport Sciences. At the university's graduation ceremony, she received the Ōshima Kamakichi Award, which recognises students with outstanding sporting achievements.

After graduating, Ishikawa began her professional career overseas. She joined Norwegian club Molde HK Elite before moving to Spanish club Super Amara Bera Bera. Her move to European club handball provided her with experience in a different league while she continued representing Japan internationally.

Ishikawa was selected for Japan's squad at the 2025 IHF Women's World Championship, co-hosted by Germany and the Netherlands. She competed against international teams as part of the Japanese side, known as Orihime Japan. The tournament was another major international appearance in her senior career.

In July 2026, the Japan Handball Association named Ishikawa in the women's national team for the Aichi–Nagoya Asian Games. She was listed as a back player and represented Japan in the women's tournament. Japan reached the final and finished with the silver medal, adding to the gold medal she had won at the previous Asian Games.
