= Aki Ueshima =

Japanese handball player (born 2001)

Personal information
- Nationality: Japanese
- Born: 5 July 2001 (age 25) Ishikawa Prefecture, Japan
- Height: 176 cm (69 in)

Sport
- Sport: Handball
- Position: Goalkeeper
- Current club: ASUL Vaulx-en-Velin Handball
- Number: 77
Medal record
Women's handball
Representing Japan
Asian Games
Silver medal – second place	2026 Aichi–Nagoya	Team
Asian Junior Championships
Silver medal – second place	2019 Beirut

Aki Ueshima (Japanese: 上嶋 亜樹; born 5 July 2001) is a Japanese handball player who plays as a goalkeeper for French club ASUL Vaulx-en-Velin Handball and the Japan women's national team. She represented Japan at the 2025 IHF Women's World Handball Championship and won a silver medal in the women's tournament at the 2026 Asian Games in Aichi–Nagoya. She previously played for clubs in the Netherlands, Japan and Iceland.

== Career ==
Ueshima was born on 5 July 2001 in Ishikawa Prefecture, Japan. She attended Komatsu Municipal High School before enrolling at the University of Tsukuba, where she played for the university's women's handball team. During her university career, she competed in national collegiate competitions, and the team finished as runner-up at the 2023 All Japan Intercollegiate Handball Championship. She also spent time training at a handball academy in Arnhem, Netherlands, to develop her goalkeeping skills.

In 2019, Ueshima represented Japan at the Asian Women's Junior Handball Championship in Beirut, Lebanon. Japan reached the final and finished second behind South Korea, earning the silver medal. The tournament was one of her early international appearances with Japan's youth national team. She subsequently continued her development through university handball and senior-level club competition.

In early 2023, Ueshima spent a month with Dutch club SV Dalfsen Handbal, making five appearances for the team. After completing her studies at the University of Tsukuba, she joined Kumamoto Beaust Pindys in Japan in 2024. The club announced her signing in January of that year, identifying her as a goalkeeper who had represented Japan at under-16 and under-20 levels and at the 2023 Asian qualification tournament for the women's Olympic competition.

In October 2024, Ueshima signed with Icelandic club UMF Stjarnan. She later moved to France to join ASUL Vaulx-en-Velin Handball for the 2025–26 season. The French club competed in the women's second division, giving Ueshima further experience in European handball. Her club affiliation and playing position were listed in the International Handball Federation's roster for the 2025 World Championship.

Ueshima was selected for Japan's senior squad at the 2025 IHF Women's World Handball Championship, co-hosted by Germany and the Netherlands. She was listed as a goalkeeper, standing 176 cm tall, and wore number 77. The tournament marked an important senior international appearance as she continued her professional career in France.

In July 2026, the Japan Handball Association selected Ueshima for the women's national team at the Aichi–Nagoya Asian Games. Japan won its first five matches in the women's tournament before losing 23–27 to South Korea in its final match on 27 September. The result left Japan with five wins and one defeat, securing the silver medal.
