= Arisa Kinjo =

Japanese handball player

Personal information
- Nationality: Japanese
- Born: 8 December 1999 (age 26) Okinawa Prefecture, Japan
- Height: 160 cm (63 in)

Sport
- Sport: Handball
- Position: Right back
- Current club: Samcheok City Hall
Medal record
Women's handball
Representing Japan
Asian Games
Silver medal – second place	2026 Aichi–Nagoya	Team

Arisa Kinjo (Japanese: 金城 ありさ, Kinjo Arisa; born 8 December 1999) is a Japanese handball player who plays as a right back for Samcheok City Hall in South Korea and the Japan women's national handball team. She won a silver medal with Japan at the 2026 Asian Games and represented the country at the 2025 World Women's Handball Championship.

== Career ==
Kinjo attended Tokyo Women's College of Physical Education, where she played collegiate handball. She competed alongside Miyako Hatsumi, and the pair helped their university win the 2018 All Japan Student Handball Championship and the 2019 Kanto Student Handball League Division 1 title. Kinjo began playing handball in elementary school, influenced by her older sister, who also played the sport.

Kinjo represented Japan in international competitions while studying at Tokyo Women's College of Physical Education. She was included in Japan's squad for the 2024 IHF Women's Olympic Qualification Tournament, where she scored seven goals in the match against Hungary.

In November 2025, Kinjo joined Samcheok City Hall, a South Korean handball club competing in the Korea Handball League. She represented Japan at the 2025 World Women's Handball Championship, held in Germany and the Netherlands, playing as a right back.

Kinjo was selected for Japan's women's handball team at the 2026 Asian Games in Aichi and Nagoya. Japan advanced to the final, where it lost to South Korea and finished with the silver medal.
