= Kuwait women's national handball team =

Kuwait

Information
- Association: Kuwait Handball Association

Colours
1st	2nd

Results

Asian Championship
- Appearances: 2 (First in 2012)
- Best result: 10th (2021)
- Last updated on Unknown.

The Kuwait women's national handball team is the national team of Kuwait. It is governed by the Kuwait Handball Association and takes part in international handball competitions.

On 15 September 2015, the International Handball Federation suspended the Kuwait Handball Association.

== Tournament history ==
=== Asian Championship ===
Year	Rank	M	W	D	L	GF	GA	Dif
(Jordan) 1987	Did not enter							
(China) 1989	Did not enter							
(Japan) 1991	Did not enter							
(China) 1993	Did not enter							
(South Korea) 1995	Did not enter							
(Jordan) 1997	Did not enter							
(Japan) 1999	Did not enter							
(China) 2000	Did not enter							
(Kazakhstan) 2002	Did not enter							
(Japan) 2004	Did not enter							
(China) 2006	Did not enter							
(Thailand) 2008	Did not enter							
(Kazakhstan) 2010	Did not enter							
(Indonesia) 2012	12th	7	0	0	7	46	388	−342
(Indonesia) 2015	Did not enter							
(South Korea) 2017	Did not enter							
(Japan) 2018	Did not enter							
(Jordan) 2021	10th	6	1	0	5	98	185	−87
Total	2/18	0	0	0	0	0	0	0
