= Han Sun-hee =

South Korean handball player (born 1973)

Personal information
- Nationality: South Korean
- Born: 9 June 1973 (age 53)
- Height: 172 cm (68 in)

Sport
- Sport: Handball
- Position: Left wing
- Current club: Retired

Senior clubs
- Years: Team
- –: Allianz Life Séoul
- 2006–2008: Hypo Niederösterreich
National team
- Years: Team
- –: South Korea
Medal record
Representing South Korea
Women's handball
Olympic Games
Gold medal – first place	1992 Barcelona	Team
Silver medal – second place	1996 Atlanta	Team
World Championship
Gold medal – first place	1995 Austria/Hungary
Asian Games
Gold medal – first place	1998 Bangkok
Asian Championship
Gold medal – first place	1993 China
Gold medal – first place	1995 South Korea
Gold medal – first place	1997 Jordan

Han Sun-Hee (born June 9, 1973) is a South Korean team handball player (left wing) and Olympic champion. She played for the Korean team and received a gold medal at the 1992 Summer Olympics in Barcelona. She received a silver medal at the 1996 Summer Olympics in Atlanta.

In 1995 she was part of the South Korea team that won the 1995 World Championship. At the 1997 World Women's Handball Championship she reached a 5th place with the South Korean team.

She also won a gold medal for South Korea at the 1998 Asian Games.

Between 2006 and 2008 she played for Hypo Niederösterreich in Austria together with her national team colleagues Oh Seong-ok and Cha-youn Kim. Here she won the Austrian Championship and Cup in both seasons, and reached the final of the 2007-08 EHF Women's Champions League, where they lost to Russian Zvezda Zvenigorod.
