= Kazakhstan women's national handball team =

Kazakhstan

Information
- Association: Kazakhstan Handball Federation
- Coach: Aliaksandr Sytsko

Colours
1st	2nd

Results

Summer Olympics
- Appearances: 1 (First in 2008)
- Best result: 10th (2008)

World Championship
- Appearances: 8 (First in 2007)
- Best result: 18th (2007)

Asian Championship
- Appearances: 13 (First in 1993)
- Best result: (gold) Champions (2002, 2010)
- Last updated on Unknown.

The Kazakhstan women's national handball team is the national handball team of Kazakhstan and takes part in international handball competitions.

The team's first world championship was at the 2007 World Women's Handball Championship in France, where they finished 18th. They also participated in the 2009 World Women's Handball Championship in China, finishing 22nd. At the 2011 World Women's Handball Championship in Brazil they finished 19th. The team had also qualified for the 2003 World Women's Handball Championship, but decided to withdraw.

They won the title at the 2002 and 2010 Asian Women's Handball Championship.

== Results ==
=== Summer Olympics ===
Year	Position	Pld	W	D	L	GS	GA	+/-
(China) 2008	10th	5	1	1	3	109	137	−28
Total	1/12	5	1	1	3	109	13	−28

Handball at the 2012 Summer Olympics – Asian women's qualification tournament Handball at the 2016 Summer Olympics – Asian women's qualification tournament Handball at the 2020 Summer Olympics – Asian women's qualification tournament Handball at the 2024 Summer Olympics – Asian women's qualification tournament

=== World Championship ===
- 2007 – 18th
- 2009 – 22nd
- 2011 – 19th
- 2015 – 22nd
- 2019 – 22nd
- 2021 – 24th
- 2023 – 30th
- 2025 – 31st

=== Asian Championship ===
Year	Position	Pld	W	D	L	GS	GA	+/-
(China) 1993	5th	4	2	0	2	128	80	+40
(South Korea) 1995	did not enter							
(Jordan) 1997	did not enter							
(Japan) 1999	did not enter							
(China) 2000	5th	4	2	0	2	117	84	+33
(Kazakhstan) 2002	1st	5	5	0	0	143	107	+36
(Japan) 2004	did not enter							
(China) 2006	4th	3	0	0	3	56	114	−58
(Thailand) 2008	5th	5	3	0	2	178	111	+67
(Kazakhstan) 2010	1st	5	5	0	0	157	122	+35
(Indonesia) 2012	4th	7	4	0	3	249	145	+104
(Indonesia) 2015	4th	6	4	0	2	224	132	+92
(South Korea) 2017	4th	5	2	0	3	130	135	−5
(Japan) 2018	4th	6	3	0	3	192	156	+36
(Jordan) 2021	3rd	6	4	0	2	177	186	−9
(South Korea) 2022	5th	6	4	0	2	177	168	+9
(India) 2024	3rd	5	3	0	2	137	115	+22
(Kazakhstan) 2026	qualified							
Total	14/21	67	41	0	26	2065	1655	+410

=== Asian Games ===
Handball at the Asian Games

1. Handball at the 1994 Asian Games
2. Handball at the 1998 Asian Games
3. Handball at the 2002 Asian Games
4. Handball at the 2006 Asian Games
5. Handball at the 2010 Asian Games
6. Handball at the 2014 Asian Games
7. Handball at the 2018 Asian Games
8. Handball at the 2022 Asian Games
9. Handball at the 2026 Asian Games

== Current squad ==
Squad for the 2025 World Women's Handball Championship.

Head coach: Aliaksandr Sytsko

No.	Pos.	Name	Date of birth (age)	Height	App.	Goals	Club
3	P	Mariya Sitnikova	11 October 1998 (age 28)	1.65 m	37	62	(Kazakhstan) Handball Club Turan
4	LB	Zhanerke Kuandykova	25 February 2004 (age 22)	1.80 m	33	49	(Kazakhstan) Handball Club Astana
5	LB	Aiym Tursyn	29 August 2007 (age 19)	1.64 m	9	23	(Kazakhstan) HC Alatay
7	CB	Aida Zhaparova	16 February 2000 (age 26)	1.60 m	35	85	(Kazakhstan) Azeryol HC
8	LB	Nazym Sabyrzhankyzy	17 May 2002 (age 24)	1.80 m	8	36	(Kazakhstan) Kaysar Club
10	RB	Kristina Radayeva	4 January 1995 (age 31)	1.79 m	79	183	(North Macedonia) HC Gjorce Petrov
11	P	Zlata Zvyagina	26 November 2002 (age 23)	1.72 m	52	71	(Kazakhstan) Kaysar Club
12	GK	Zhannat Aitenova	5 November 1989 (age 37)	1.82 m	120	4	(Kazakhstan) Kaysar Club
15	LB	Irina Khassakhanova	2 October 1994 (age 32)	1.87 m	115	298	(Kazakhstan) HC Alatay
16	GK	Darya Kolesnichenko	8 August 2004 (age 22)	1.78 m	18	0	(Kazakhstan) HC Kazygurt
17	RW	Zhanerke Seitkassym	5 December 2002 (age 23)	1.62 m	52	91	(Kazakhstan) Kaysar Club
22	P	Madina Myrzamseiitova	4 February 2005 (age 21)	1.82 m	25	41	(Kazakhstan) Handball Club Astana
35	P	Kira Nemtyreva	7 January 2005 (age 21)	1.80 m	8	19	(Kazakhstan) HC Karaganda
44	GK	Damira Zhaparova	27 November 2005 (age 20)	1.70 m	27	0	(Kazakhstan) Handball Club Astana
99	RB	Mariya Pupchenkova	10 March 1998 (age 28)	1.78 m	82	127	(Kazakhstan) Kaysar Club
