= Zhai Chao =

Chinese handball player (born 1971)

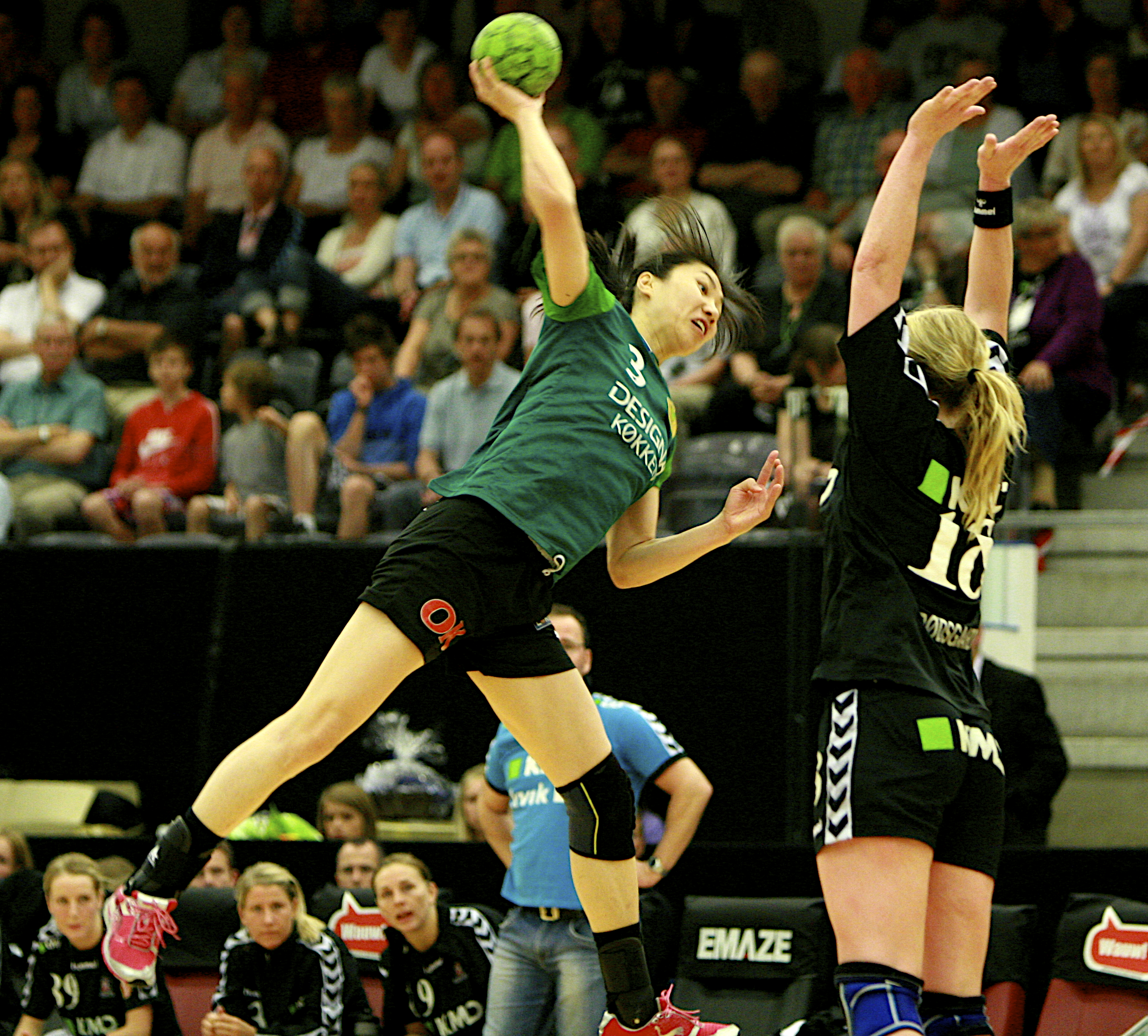

Personal information
- Nationality: Chinese
- Born: 14 December 1971 (age 54) Beijing, China
- Height: 178 cm (70 in)

Sport
- Sport: Handball
- Position: Playmaker / Left back
- Current club: Retired

Senior clubs
- Years: Team
- –: Beijing
- 1998-2000: SV Berliner VG 49
- 2001-2004: Randers HK
- 2004-2010: Viborg HK
National team
- Years: Team
- 1989–2004: China
Medal record
Women's Handball
Representing China
Asian Games
Silver medal – second place	1990 Beijing	Team
Bronze medal – third place	1994 Hiroshima	Team
Bronze medal – third place	2002 Busan	Team
Asian Championships
Silver medal – second place	1995 Seoul	Team
Silver medal – second place	1997 Amman	Team

Zhai Chao (Chinese: 翟超; pinyin: Zhái Chāo; born December 14, 1971, in Beijing) is a Chinese handball player who competed in the 1996 and 2004 Summer Olympics, as well as in the 1999, 2001 and 2003 World championships. Widely considered the best Chinese player of all time, and one of the best Asian players of all time, she was voted IHF World Player of the Year 2002.

== Career ==
Chao Zhai started playing handball in Beijing in 1985. In the 1996 Olympics she finished fifth with the Chinese team. She played all four matches and scored 29 goals. She played for the Chinese national team at the 1999 World championship in Denmark/Norway. She started playing for the German club SV Berliner VG 49 in January 1998, and switched to the Danish club Randers HK in 2001. She played for the Chinese national team in the 2001 World Women's Handball Championship in Italy where she scored 49 goals and the 6th best scorer in the championship. She was a member of the Chinese team which finished eighth in the 2004 summer Olympics, where she played all seven matches and scored 32 goals. In 2004, she started playing for the Danish club Viborg HK, and with this club she won the EHF Champions League in 2006 and 2009. In 2007-08 she took a break from handball due to pregnancy.

== Awards ==
Chao Zhai was voted World Handball Player of the Year 2002 by the International Handball Federation.

Awards
Preceded by Cecilie Leganger	IHF World Player of the Year – Women; 2002	Succeeded by Bojana Radulović
