= Handball at the 1990 Asian Games – Women's tournament =

Sports in Asian Games

Women at the 1990 Asian Games
- Venue: Beijiao Gymnasium
- Date: 26 September – 5 October 1990
- Nations: 6

Medalists
| gold medal | South Korea |
| silver medal | China |
| bronze medal | Chinese Taipei |

Women's handball at the 1990 Asian Games was held in Beijiao Gymnasium, Beijing from 26 September to 5 October 1990.

== Results ==
| Pos | Team | Pld | W | D | L | GF | GA | GD | Pts |
|---|---|---|---|---|---|---|---|---|---|
| 1 | South Korea | 5 | 5 | 0 | 0 | 179 | 111 | +68 | 10 |
| 2 | China | 5 | 4 | 0 | 1 | 139 | 103 | +36 | 8 |
| 3 | Chinese Taipei | 5 | 2 | 1 | 2 | 121 | 124 | −3 | 5 |
| 4 | North Korea | 5 | 2 | 0 | 3 | 143 | 129 | +14 | 4 |
| 5 | Japan | 5 | 1 | 1 | 3 | 125 | 112 | +13 | 3 |
| 6 | Hong Kong | 5 | 0 | 0 | 5 | 62 | 190 | −128 | 0 |

Source: Results

| 26 September | China | 37–3 | Hong Kong | Beijiao Gymnasium, Beijing |

| 26 September | Chinese Taipei | 25–23 | North Korea | Beijiao Gymnasium, Beijing |

| 26 September | South Korea | 32–23 | Japan | Beijiao Gymnasium, Beijing |

| 28 September | North Korea | 26–24 | Japan | Beijiao Gymnasium, Beijing |

| 28 September | South Korea | 40–22 | Hong Kong | Beijiao Gymnasium, Beijing |

| 28 September | China | 30–19 | Chinese Taipei | Beijiao Gymnasium, Beijing |

| 30 September | Chinese Taipei | 37–18 | Hong Kong | Beijiao Gymnasium, Beijing |

| 30 September | China | 27–21 | Japan | Beijiao Gymnasium, Beijing |

| 30 September | South Korea | 40–29 | North Korea | Beijiao Gymnasium, Beijing |

| 2 October | South Korea | 31–18 | Chinese Taipei | Beijiao Gymnasium, Beijing |

| 2 October | Japan | 35–5 | Hong Kong | Beijiao Gymnasium, Beijing |

| 2 October | China | 26–24 | North Korea | Beijiao Gymnasium, Beijing |

| 4 October | Hong Kong | 14–41 | North Korea | Beijiao Gymnasium, Beijing |

| 4 October | Japan | 22–22 | Chinese Taipei | Beijiao Gymnasium, Beijing |

| 5 October | South Korea | 36–19 | China | Beijiao Gymnasium, Beijing |

== Final standing ==
| Rank | Team | Pld | W | D | L |
|---|---|---|---|---|---|
| 1st place, gold medalist(s) | South Korea | 5 | 5 | 0 | 0 |
| 2nd place, silver medalist(s) | China | 5 | 4 | 0 | 1 |
| 3rd place, bronze medalist(s) | Chinese Taipei | 5 | 2 | 1 | 2 |
| 4 | North Korea | 5 | 2 | 0 | 3 |
| 5 | Japan | 5 | 1 | 1 | 3 |
| 6 | Hong Kong | 5 | 0 | 0 | 5 |
