= Song Hai-rim =

South Korean handball player (born 1985)

Personal information
- Nationality: South Korean
- Born: 12 January 1985 (age 41) Seoul, South Korea
- Height: 1.67 m (5 ft 6 in)

Sport
- Sport: Handball
- Position: Back

Senior clubs
- Years: Team
- 2002–2010: Daegu Metropolitan City Hall
- 2010–2015: Hiroshima Maple Reds
- 2016–2019: Seoul City Hall
- 2019–2020: Gwangju Metropolitan City Corporation
- 2021–2022: Sony Semiconductor HC
National team
- Years: Team
- –: South Korea

Teams managed
- 2022–2025: Sony Semiconductor
- 2025–: Incheon City Hall (assistent)
Medal record
Olympic Games
Bronze medal – third place	2008 Beijing	Team
Asian Championship
Bronze medal – third place	2006 China	Team
Asian Games
Gold medal – first place	2018 Jakarta	Team
- Song Hai-rim
- Hangul: 송해림
- RR: Song Haerim
- MR: Song Haerim

Song Hai-rim (Korean: 송해림; born January 12, 1985, in Seoul), also spelled as Song Hae-rim, is a South Korean handball player and coach.

She competed at the 2008 Summer Olympics, where she won a bronze medal with the South Korean team.

Between 2022 and 2025 she coached the Japanese team Sony Semiconductor, and here she won the 2025 Japan Handball League. In 2025 she became the assistant coach of Incheon City Hall.
