= Japan Handball Association =

Governing body of handball and beach handball in Japan

Japan Handball Association JHA
- IOC nation: Japan
- Sport: Handball
- Other sports: Beach handball; Wheelchair handball
- Official website: www.handball.or.jp

AFFILIATIONS
- International federation: International Handball Federation (IHF)
- IHF member since: 1952
- Continental association: Asian Handball Federation
- National Olympic Committee: Japanese Olympic Committee
- Other affiliation(s): East Asian Handball Association; Japan Sport Council; Japan Anti-Doping Agency

GOVERNING BODY
- President: Yoshihide Watanabe (Japan)

HEADQUARTERS
- Address: Tokyo
- Country: Japan
- Secretary General: Seimei Gamo (Japan)

FINANCE
- Sponsors: Yamato Transport; ASICS; Wakunaga Pharmaceutical Co., Ltd. All Nippon Airways

The Japan Handball Association (JHA) (Japanese: 日本ハンドボール協会) is the governing body of handball and beach handball in Japan. JHA is affiliated to the Asian Handball Federation (AHF), Japanese Olympic Committee and International Handball Federation (IHF) since 1952.

== Competitions ==
- Japan Handball League

== National teams ==
- Japan men's national handball team
- Japan men's national junior handball team
- Japan men's national youth handball team
- Japan women's national handball team
- Japan women's national junior handball team
- Japan women's national youth handball team

== Competitions hosted ==
=== International ===
- 2020 Summer Olympics
- 2019 World Women's Handball Championship
- 2001 World Games
- 1997 World Men's Handball Championship

=== Continental ===
- 2024 Asian Men's Handball Championship
- 2018 Asian Women's Handball Championship
- 2011 Asian Women's Youth Handball Championship
- 2006 Asian Men's Junior Handball Championship
- 2004 Asian Women's Handball Championship
- 2000 Asian Men's Handball Championship
- 1999 Asian Women's Handball Championship
- 1998 Asian Women's Junior Handball Championship
- 1994 Asian Games
- 1991 Asian Women's Handball Championship
- 1991 Asian Men's Handball Championship
