= Masamichi Kuriyama =

Japanese handball coach

Masamichi Kuriyama (Japanese: 栗山雅倫, born 21 June 1971) is a Japanese handball coach, who previously coached the Japanese national team from 2012 to 2015. He coached the team at the 2013 and the 2015 World Women's Handball Championship.

He was replaced by Danish coach Ulrik Kirkely.

== External ==
- DhDB profile
