= Oh Seong-ok =

South Korean handball player (born 1972)

Personal information
- Nationality: South Korean
- Born: 10 October 1972 (age 54) Daejeon, South Korea

Sport
- Sport: Handball
- Position: centre back/left back
- Current club: Retired

Senior clubs
- Years: Team
- 1991–1995: Korean Sport University
- 1995–1999: Chong Kun Dang
- 1999–2006: Hiroshima Maple Reds
- 2006–2010: Hypo Niederösterreich
- 2010–?: Hiroshima Maple Reds
National team
Years	Team	Apps
1989–2008	South Korea	260

Teams managed
- 2009–2010: Hypo Niederösterreich
- 2016–?: South Korea junior
- 2021–2022: SK Sugar Gliders
Medal record
Representing South Korea
Women's handball
Gold medal – first place	1992 Barcelona	Team
Silver medal – second place	1996 Atlanta	Team
Silver medal – second place	2004 Athens	Team
Bronze medal – third place	2008 Beijing	Team
World Championship
Gold medal – first place	1995 Austria/Hungary
Asian Games
Gold medal – first place	1990 Beyjing
Gold medal – first place	1994 Hiroshima
- Korean name
- Hangul: 오성옥
- Hanja: 吳成玉
- RR: O Seongok
- MR: O Sŏngok

Oh Seong-Ok (born October 10, 1972) is a former South Korean handball player (centre back/left back). She is the first South Korean woman to compete at five Olympics (1992 to 2008). She has won both Olympics, World and Asian gold medals with the South Korean National team.

== Career ==
Oh Seong-Ok played for Korean Sport University and HC Chong Kun Dang in her home country. In 1999 she joined the Japanese team Hiroshima Maple Reds, where she won 6 Japanese Championships.

In 2006 she joined the Austrian top club Hypo Niederösterreich, together with national team colleagues Kim Cha-youn and Han Sun-hee. Here she won the Austrian Championship and Cup four years in a row from 2007 to 2010. With the club she also reached the final of the 2007-08 EHF Women's Champions League, where they lost to Russian Zvezda Zvenigorod. In 2006-07 and in 2007-08 she was named women's handballer of the year in Austria. She left the club in 2010.

In 2021 she became the coach of the South Korean team SK Sugar Gliders, but left the team after a year for personal reasons.

== National team ==
At the 1992 Olympics, Oh was part of the South Korea team, which won the gold medal. She played all five matches and scored twenty goals. Four years later, she won the silver medal at the 1996 Olympics, a feat she repeated in 2004, where South Korea lost to Denmark in the final on a penalty shoot out.

In 1995 she was part of the South Korea team that won the 1995 World Championship. This was the first time a non-European team won the title, and as of 2026 the only Asian team to do so.

== See also ==
- List of athletes with the most appearances at Olympic Games
- List of multiple Olympic medalists in one event
