= 2015 Asian Women's Handball Championship =

Tournament details
- Host country: Indonesia
- Venue: 1 (in 1 host city)
- Dates: 14 – 23 March
- Teams: 9 (from 1 confederation)

Final positions
- Champions: South Korea (12th title)
- Runners-up: Japan
- Third place: China
- Fourth place: Kazakhstan

Tournament statistics
- Matches played: 24
- Goals scored: 1,398 (58.25 per match)

The 2015 Asian Women's Handball Championship was the 15th edition of the Asian Women's Handball Championship, which took place from 14 to 23 March 2015 at Jakarta, Indonesia. The tournament was held under the aegis of Asian Handball Federation. It also acted as the Asian qualifying tournament for the 2015 World Women's Handball Championship.

== Draw ==
The draw was held on 11 January 2015.

Group A	Group B
South Korea	China
Japan	Kazakhstan
Iran	Uzbekistan
India	Hong Kong
~~Turkmenistan~~	Indonesia

== Preliminary round ==
All times are local (UTC+7).

Team advanced to the knockout stage
Team advanced to the 5–8th placement matches

=== Group A ===
Team	Pld	W	D	L	GF	GA	GD	Pts
South Korea	3	3	0	0	142	41	+101	6
Japan	3	2	0	1	116	51	+65	4
Iran	3	1	0	2	64	129	−65	2
India	3	0	0	3	42	143	−101	0

14 March 2015; 17:00	Iran	11–60	South Korea	POPKI Sport Hall, Jakarta
14 March 2015; 17:00	Esfahani 3	(6–28)	Kim Jin-sil 8	POPKI Sport Hall, Jakarta
14 March 2015; 17:00		Report		POPKI Sport Hall, Jakarta

15 March 2015; 17:00	Iran	11–45	Japan	POPKI Sport Hall, Jakarta
15 March 2015; 17:00	Ghahremani 3	(5–24)	five players 5	POPKI Sport Hall, Jakarta
15 March 2015; 17:00		Report		POPKI Sport Hall, Jakarta

16 March 2015; 15:00	Japan	51–8	India	POPKI Sport Hall, Jakarta
16 March 2015; 15:00	Hara 10	(30–4)	Kaur 3	POPKI Sport Hall, Jakarta
16 March 2015; 15:00		Report		POPKI Sport Hall, Jakarta

18 March 2015; 19:00	India	10–50	South Korea	POPKI Sport Hall, Jakarta
18 March 2015; 19:00	Sharma 3	(7–28)	Bae Min-hee 9	POPKI Sport Hall, Jakarta
18 March 2015; 19:00		Report		POPKI Sport Hall, Jakarta

19 March 2015; 15:00	India	24–42	Iran	POPKI Sport Hall, Jakarta
19 March 2015; 15:00	Kaur 8	(12–18)	Rajabi 13	POPKI Sport Hall, Jakarta
19 March 2015; 15:00		Report		POPKI Sport Hall, Jakarta

19 March 2015; 19:00	South Korea	32–20	Japan	POPKI Sport Hall, Jakarta
19 March 2015; 19:00		(16–15)		POPKI Sport Hall, Jakarta
19 March 2015; 19:00		Report		POPKI Sport Hall, Jakarta

=== Group B ===
Team	Pld	W	D	L	GF	GA	GD	Pts
Kazakhstan	4	4	0	0	178	67	+111	8
China	4	3	0	1	174	63	+111	6
Uzbekistan	4	2	0	2	146	104	+42	4
Hong Kong	4	1	0	3	77	123	−46	2
Indonesia (H)	4	0	0	4	25	241	−216	0

(H) Hosts

14 March 2015; 15:00	Uzbekistan	15–42	China	POPKI Sport Hall, Jakarta
14 March 2015; 15:00	Najmedinova 5	(13–22)	Shen Ping 7	POPKI Sport Hall, Jakarta
14 March 2015; 15:00		Report		POPKI Sport Hall, Jakarta

14 March 2015; 19:00	Indonesia	10–39	Hong Kong	POPKI Sport Hall, Jakarta
14 March 2015; 19:00	Lopez 4	(2–22)	three players 6	POPKI Sport Hall, Jakarta
14 March 2015; 19:00		Report		POPKI Sport Hall, Jakarta

15 March 2015; 15:00	Uzbekistan	23–40	Kazakhstan	POPKI Sport Hall, Jakarta
15 March 2015; 15:00	Khalimuratova 6	(14–16)	Tankina 9	POPKI Sport Hall, Jakarta
15 March 2015; 15:00		Report		POPKI Sport Hall, Jakarta

15 March 2015; 19:00	China	42–11	Hong Kong	POPKI Sport Hall, Jakarta
15 March 2015; 19:00		(24–4)		POPKI Sport Hall, Jakarta
15 March 2015; 19:00		Report		POPKI Sport Hall, Jakarta

16 March 2015; 17:00	Kazakhstan	68–5	Indonesia	POPKI Sport Hall, Jakarta
16 March 2015; 17:00	Olga, Aleksandrova 10	(32–2)	five players 1	POPKI Sport Hall, Jakarta
16 March 2015; 17:00		Report		POPKI Sport Hall, Jakarta

16 March 2015; 19:00	Hong Kong	16–35	Uzbekistan	POPKI Sport Hall, Jakarta
16 March 2015; 19:00	Yiu Hei Yan, Lam Wai Yu 3	(6–18)	Najmedinova 6	POPKI Sport Hall, Jakarta
16 March 2015; 19:00		Report		POPKI Sport Hall, Jakarta

18 March 2015; 15:00	Kazakhstan	37–10	Hong Kong	POPKI Sport Hall, Jakarta
18 March 2015; 15:00	Aleksandrova 8	(20–5)	Lam Wai Yu 4	POPKI Sport Hall, Jakarta
18 March 2015; 15:00		Report		POPKI Sport Hall, Jakarta

18 March 2015; 17:00	Indonesia	4–61	China	POPKI Sport Hall, Jakarta
18 March 2015; 17:00	four players 1	(3–29)	Wang Bin 12	POPKI Sport Hall, Jakarta
18 March 2015; 17:00		Report		POPKI Sport Hall, Jakarta

19 March 2015; 13:00	Indonesia	6–73	Uzbekistan	POPKI Sport Hall, Jakarta
19 March 2015; 13:00	Annisa 3	(4–29)	Erkinova 18	POPKI Sport Hall, Jakarta
19 March 2015; 13:00		Report		POPKI Sport Hall, Jakarta

19 March 2015; 17:00	China	29–33	Kazakhstan	POPKI Sport Hall, Jakarta
19 March 2015; 17:00	three players 7	(15–19)	Aleksandrova 14	POPKI Sport Hall, Jakarta
19 March 2015; 17:00		Report		POPKI Sport Hall, Jakarta

== Placement 5th–8th ==
5–8th place semifinals
21 March
Iran	22
Hong Kong	14
21 March
Uzbekistan	45
India	22

Fifth place game
22 March
Iran	18
Uzbekistan	30
Seventh place game
22 March
Hong Kong	22
India	28

=== 5–8th place semifinals ===
21 March 2015; 13:00	Iran	22–14	Hong Kong	POPKI Sport Hall, Jakarta
21 March 2015; 13:00	Rajabi 9	(12–4)	three players 3	POPKI Sport Hall, Jakarta
21 March 2015; 13:00		Report		POPKI Sport Hall, Jakarta

21 March 2015; 15:00	Uzbekistan	45–22	India	POPKI Sport Hall, Jakarta
21 March 2015; 15:00	Bahromova 14	(16–10)	three players 4	POPKI Sport Hall, Jakarta
21 March 2015; 15:00		Report		POPKI Sport Hall, Jakarta

=== Seventh place game ===
22 March 2015; 17:00	Hong Kong	22–28	India	POPKI Sport Hall, Jakarta
22 March 2015; 17:00		Report		POPKI Sport Hall, Jakarta

=== Fifth place game ===
22 March 2015; 15:00	Iran	18–30	Uzbekistan	POPKI Sport Hall, Jakarta
22 March 2015; 15:00	Janbaz 4	(10–16)	Goloskokova 11	POPKI Sport Hall, Jakarta
22 March 2015; 15:00		Report		POPKI Sport Hall, Jakarta

== Final round ==
Semifinals
21 March
South Korea	42
China	23
21 March
Kazakhstan	21
Japan	37

Final
23 March
South Korea	36
Japan	22
Third place game
23 March
China	28
Kazakhstan	25

=== Semifinals ===
21 March 2015; 17:00	South Korea	42–23	China	POPKI Sport Hall, Jakarta
21 March 2015; 17:00	Jung Yu-ra 7	(18–9)	Wang Bin 5	POPKI Sport Hall, Jakarta
21 March 2015; 17:00		Report		POPKI Sport Hall, Jakarta

21 March 2015; 19:00	Kazakhstan	21–37	Japan	POPKI Sport Hall, Jakarta
21 March 2015; 19:00		(11–17)		POPKI Sport Hall, Jakarta
21 March 2015; 19:00		Report		POPKI Sport Hall, Jakarta

=== Third place game ===
23 March 2015; 15:00	China	28–25	Kazakhstan	POPKI Sport Hall, Jakarta
23 March 2015; 15:00	Yu Yuanyuan, Sun Mengying 6	(18–9)	Alexandrova 11	POPKI Sport Hall, Jakarta
23 March 2015; 15:00		Report		POPKI Sport Hall, Jakarta

=== Final ===
23 March 2015; 17:00	South Korea	36–22	Japan	POPKI Sport Hall, Jakarta
23 March 2015; 17:00	Lee Eun-bi 8	(18–8)	Yokoshima, Fujii 5	POPKI Sport Hall, Jakarta
23 March 2015; 17:00		Report		POPKI Sport Hall, Jakarta

== Final standing ==
Rank	Team
1st place, gold medalist(s)	South Korea
2nd place, silver medalist(s)	Japan
3rd place, bronze medalist(s)	China
4	Kazakhstan
5	Uzbekistan
6	Iran
7	India
8	Hong Kong
9	Indonesia

Team qualified for the 2015 World Championship
