= Asian Handball Championship =

Asian Handball Championship may refer to:

- Asian Men's Handball Championship
- Asian Women's Handball Championship
