= Mariya Pupchenkova =

Kazakhstani handball player

Personal information
- Nationality: Kazakhstani
- Born: 10 March 1998 (age 28)
- Height: 1.75 m (5 ft 9 in)

Sport
- Sport: Handball
- Position: Right back
- Current club: Kaysar Club
National team
Years	Team	Apps	(Gls)
–	Kazakhstan	82	(127)
Medal record
Asian Championship
Bronze medal – third place	2021 Jordan
Bronze medal – third place	2024 India
- Updated on 27 November 2025

Mariya Pupchenkova (born 10 March 1998) is a Kazakhstani handball player for Kaysar Club and the Kazakhstani national team.

She represented Kazakhstan at the 2019 World Women's Handball Championship.
