= Kim Jin-sil =

South Korean handball player (born 1994)

Personal information
- Nationality: South Korean
- Born: 1 October 1994 (age 32)
- Height: 1.67 m (5 ft 6 in)

Sport
- Sport: Handball
- Position: Right wing
- Current club: Busan Infrastructure
National team
- Years: Team
- –: South Korea

- Kim Jin-sil
- Hangul: 김진실
- RR: Gim Jinsil
- MR: Kim Chinsil

Kim Jin-sil (Korean: 김진실; born 1 October 1994) is a South Korean handball player who plays for the club Busan Infrastructure. She is member of the South Korean national team. She competed at the 2015 World Women's Handball Championship in Denmark.
