= 2002 Asian Women's Handball Championship =

2002 Asian Championship
Tournament details
- Host country: Kazakhstan
- Venue: 1 (in 1 host city)
- Dates: 26–31 July
- Teams: 7 (from 1 confederation)

Final positions
- Champions: Kazakhstan (1st title)
- Runners-up: South Korea
- Third place: China
- Fourth place: Japan

Tournament statistics
- Matches played: 14
- Goals scored: 743 (53.07 per match)

The 2002 Asian Women's Handball Championship, the ninth Asian Championship, which was taking place from 26 to 31 July 2002 in Almaty, Kazakhstan. It acted as the Asian qualifying tournament for the 2003 World Women's Handball Championship. Kazakhstan won the tournament, but decided later to withdraw from the 2003 World Championship, giving the spot instead to Japan.

== Draw ==
Group A	Group B
South Korea; China; ~~North Korea~~ * Turkmenistan	Japan; Kazakhstan; Chinese Taipei; Uzbekistan

* Withdrew

== Preliminary round ==
All times are local (UTC+6).

=== Group A ===
Team	Pld	W	D	L	GF	GA	GD	Pts
South Korea	2	2	0	0	74	30	+44	4
China	2	1	0	1	61	44	+17	2
Turkmenistan	2	0	0	2	25	86	−61	0

26 July 2002; 13:30	South Korea	32–17	China	Almaty
26 July 2002; 13:30		(15–10)		Almaty

27 July 2002; 14:00	South Korea	42–13	Turkmenistan	Almaty
27 July 2002; 14:00		(22–4)		Almaty

28 July 2002; 14:00	China	44–12	Turkmenistan	Almaty
28 July 2002; 14:00		(18–5)		Almaty

=== Group B ===
Team	Pld	W	D	L	GF	GA	GD	Pts
Kazakhstan (H)	3	3	0	0	91	61	+30	6
Japan	3	2	0	1	99	63	+36	4
Chinese Taipei	3	1	0	2	69	72	−3	2
Uzbekistan	3	0	0	3	62	125	−63	0

(H) Hosts

26 July 2002; 16:00	Japan	22–17	Chinese Taipei	Almaty
26 July 2002; 16:00		(13–8)		Almaty

26 July 2002; 18:00	Kazakhstan	35–22	Uzbekistan	Almaty
26 July 2002; 18:00		(16–7)		Almaty

27 July 2002; 16:00	Japan	53–19	Uzbekistan	Almaty
27 July 2002; 16:00		(23–12)		Almaty

27 July 2002; 18:00	Kazakhstan	29–15	Chinese Taipei	Almaty
27 July 2002; 18:00		(15–6)		Almaty

28 July 2002; 16:00	Japan	24–27	Kazakhstan	Almaty
28 July 2002; 16:00		(10–15)		Almaty

28 July 2002; 18:00	Chinese Taipei	37–21	Uzbekistan	Almaty
28 July 2002; 18:00		(14–13)		Almaty

== Placement 5th/6th ==
30 July 2002; 14:00	Turkmenistan	28–31	Chinese Taipei	Almaty
30 July 2002; 14:00		(14–18)		Almaty

== Final round ==
Semifinals
30 July – Almaty
South Korea	31
Japan	22
30 July – Almaty
Kazakhstan	25
China	21

Gold medal match
31 July – Almaty
South Korea	25
Kazakhstan	27
Bronze medal match
31 July – Almaty
Japan	23
China	29

=== Semifinals ===
30 July 2002; 16:00	South Korea	31–22	Japan	Almaty
30 July 2002; 16:00		(14–9)		Almaty

30 July 2002; 18:00	Kazakhstan	25–21	China	Almaty
30 July 2002; 18:00		(13–11)		Almaty

=== Bronze medal match ===
31 July 2002; 16:00	Japan	23–29	China	Almaty
31 July 2002; 16:00		(10–15)		Almaty

=== Gold medal match ===
31 July 2002; 18:00	South Korea	25–27	Kazakhstan	Almaty
31 July 2002; 18:00		(13–13)		Almaty

== Final standing ==
Rank	Team
1st place, gold medalist(s)	Kazakhstan
2nd place, silver medalist(s)	South Korea
3rd place, bronze medalist(s)	China
4	Japan
5	Chinese Taipei
6	Turkmenistan
7	Uzbekistan

Team qualified for the 2003 World Championship

Kazakhstan withdrew and was replaced by Japan in the 2003 World Championship.
