= 2026 Asian Women's Handball Championship =

Tournament details
- Host country: Kazakhstan
- Venue: 1 (in 1 host city)
- Dates: 23 November – 3 December
- Teams: 10 (from 1 confederation)

The 2026 Asian Women's Handball Championship is the 21st edition of the Asian Women's Handball Championship, which takes place from 23 November to 3 December 2026 in Almaty, Kazakhstan. The tournament, held under the aegis of Asian Handball Federation, acts as the Asian qualifying tournament for the 2027 World Women's Handball Championship, with the top four teams qualifying. If the Oceania representative (Australia) finishes in the top 5, they qualify for the World Championships.

== Draw ==
The draw was held on 25 October 2026.

== Preliminary round ==
All times are local (UTC+5).

=== Group A ===
Pos	Team	Pld	W	D	L	GF	GA	GD	Pts	Qualification
1	Japan	0	0	0	0	0	0	0	0	Quarterfinals
1	Iran	0	0	0	0	0	0	0	0	Quarterfinals
1	China	0	0	0	0	0	0	0	0	Quarterfinals
1	Hong Kong	0	0	0	0	0	0	0	0	Quarterfinals
1	Thailand (Note: After Bangladesh withdrew, Thailand was moved to Group A.)	0	0	0	0	0	0	0	0	Ninth place game
—	Bangladesh (Note: Bangladesh withdrew before the tournament.)	0	0	0	0	0	0	0	0	Withdrew

First match(es) will be played: 23 November 2026. Source: IHF
Rules for classification: 1) points; 2) head-to-head points; 3) head-to-head goal difference; 4) head-to-head number of goals scored; 5) goal difference.
Notes:

23 November 2026; 13:00	Hong Kong	v	Iran	Dostyk Universal Sports Complex, Almaty
23 November 2026; 13:00		Report		Dostyk Universal Sports Complex, Almaty

23 November 2026; 15:00	Thailand	v	Japan	Dostyk Universal Sports Complex, Almaty
23 November 2026; 15:00		Report		Dostyk Universal Sports Complex, Almaty

24 November 2026; 11:00	Hong Kong	v	Japan	Dostyk Universal Sports Complex, Almaty
24 November 2026; 11:00		Report		Dostyk Universal Sports Complex, Almaty

24 November 2026; 17:00	China	v	Iran	Dostyk Universal Sports Complex, Almaty
24 November 2026; 17:00		Report		Dostyk Universal Sports Complex, Almaty

25 November 2026; 13:00	Iran	v	Thailand	Dostyk Universal Sports Complex, Almaty
25 November 2026; 13:00		Report		Dostyk Universal Sports Complex, Almaty

25 November 2026; 15:00	Hong Kong	v	China	Dostyk Universal Sports Complex, Almaty
25 November 2026; 15:00		Report		Dostyk Universal Sports Complex, Almaty

27 November 2026; 11:00	Thailand	v	Hong Kong	Dostyk Universal Sports Complex, Almaty
27 November 2026; 11:00		Report		Dostyk Universal Sports Complex, Almaty

27 November 2026; 15:00	China	v	Japan	Dostyk Universal Sports Complex, Almaty
27 November 2026; 15:00		Report		Dostyk Universal Sports Complex, Almaty

28 November 2026; 11:00	Thailand	v	China	Dostyk Universal Sports Complex, Almaty
28 November 2026; 11:00		Report		Dostyk Universal Sports Complex, Almaty

28 November 2026; 15:00	Japan	v	Iran	Dostyk Universal Sports Complex, Almaty
28 November 2026; 15:00		Report		Dostyk Universal Sports Complex, Almaty

=== Group B ===
Pos	Team	Pld	W	D	L	GF	GA	GD	Pts	Qualification
1	South Korea	0	0	0	0	0	0	0	0	Quarterfinals
1	Kazakhstan (H)	0	0	0	0	0	0	0	0	Quarterfinals
1	India	0	0	0	0	0	0	0	0	Quarterfinals
1	Australia	0	0	0	0	0	0	0	0	Quarterfinals
1	Uzbekistan	0	0	0	0	0	0	0	0	Ninth place game

First match(es) will be played: 23 November 2026. Source: IHF
Rules for classification: 1) points; 2) head-to-head points; 3) head-to-head goal difference; 4) head-to-head number of goals scored; 5) goal difference.
(H) Hosts

23 November 2026; 11:00	Uzbekistan	v	South Korea	Dostyk Universal Sports Complex, Almaty
23 November 2026; 11:00		Report		Dostyk Universal Sports Complex, Almaty

23 November 2026; 17:00	Australia	v	Kazakhstan	Dostyk Universal Sports Complex, Almaty
23 November 2026; 17:00		Report		Dostyk Universal Sports Complex, Almaty

24 November 2026; 13:00	Australia	v	South Korea	Dostyk Universal Sports Complex, Almaty
24 November 2026; 13:00		Report		Dostyk Universal Sports Complex, Almaty

24 November 2026; 15:00	India	v	Kazakhstan	Dostyk Universal Sports Complex, Almaty
24 November 2026; 15:00		Report		Dostyk Universal Sports Complex, Almaty

25 November 2026; 11:00	Australia	v	India	Dostyk Universal Sports Complex, Almaty
25 November 2026; 11:00		Report		Dostyk Universal Sports Complex, Almaty

25 November 2026; 17:00	Kazakhstan	v	Uzbekistan	Dostyk Universal Sports Complex, Almaty
25 November 2026; 17:00		Report		Dostyk Universal Sports Complex, Almaty

27 November 2026; 13:00	Uzbekistan	v	Australia	Dostyk Universal Sports Complex, Almaty
27 November 2026; 13:00		Report		Dostyk Universal Sports Complex, Almaty

27 November 2026; 17:00	India	v	South Korea	Dostyk Universal Sports Complex, Almaty
27 November 2026; 17:00		Report		Dostyk Universal Sports Complex, Almaty

28 November 2026; 13:00	Uzbekistan	v	India	Dostyk Universal Sports Complex, Almaty
28 November 2026; 13:00		Report		Dostyk Universal Sports Complex, Almaty

28 November 2026; 17:00	South Korea	v	Kazakhstan	Dostyk Universal Sports Complex, Almaty
28 November 2026; 17:00		Report		Dostyk Universal Sports Complex, Almaty

== Knockout stage ==
=== Bracket ===
Quarter-finals
30 November
A1
B4
30 November
B2
A3
30 November
B1
A4
30 November
A2
B3

Semi-finals
1 December
1 December

Final
3 December
Third place
3 December

Fifth place bracket

5–8th place semifinals
1 December
1 December

Fifth place game
3 December
Seventh place game
3 December

=== Quarterfinals ===
30 November 2026; 11:00	A2	v	B3	Dostyk Universal Sports Complex, Almaty
30 November 2026; 11:00		Report		Dostyk Universal Sports Complex, Almaty

30 November 2026; 13:00	B2	v	A3	Dostyk Universal Sports Complex, Almaty
30 November 2026; 13:00		Report		Dostyk Universal Sports Complex, Almaty

30 November 2026; 15:00	A1	v	B4	Dostyk Universal Sports Complex, Almaty
30 November 2026; 15:00		Report		Dostyk Universal Sports Complex, Almaty

30 November 2026; 17:00	B1	v	A4	Dostyk Universal Sports Complex, Almaty
30 November 2026; 17:00		Report		Dostyk Universal Sports Complex, Almaty

=== 5–8th place semifinals ===
1 December 2026; 13:00	LQF1	v	LQF2	Dostyk Universal Sports Complex, Almaty
1 December 2026; 13:00		Report		Dostyk Universal Sports Complex, Almaty

1 December 2026; 15:00	LQF3	v	LQF4	Dostyk Universal Sports Complex, Almaty
1 December 2026; 15:00		Report		Dostyk Universal Sports Complex, Almaty

=== Semifinals ===
1 December 2026; 17:00	WQF1	v	WQF2	Dostyk Universal Sports Complex, Almaty
1 December 2026; 17:00		Report		Dostyk Universal Sports Complex, Almaty

1 December 2026; 19:00	WQF3	v	WQF4	Dostyk Universal Sports Complex, Almaty
1 December 2026; 19:00		Report		Dostyk Universal Sports Complex, Almaty

=== Ninth place game ===
1 December 2026; 11:00	A5	v	B5	Dostyk Universal Sports Complex, Almaty

=== Seventh place game ===
3 December 2026; 10:00	LSF1	v	LSF2	Dostyk Universal Sports Complex, Almaty
3 December 2026; 10:00		Report		Dostyk Universal Sports Complex, Almaty

=== Fifth place game ===
3 December 2026; 12:00	WSF1	v	WSF2	Dostyk Universal Sports Complex, Almaty
3 December 2026; 12:00		Report		Dostyk Universal Sports Complex, Almaty

=== Third place game ===
3 December 2026; 14:00	LSF1	v	LSF2	Dostyk Universal Sports Complex, Almaty
3 December 2026; 14:00		Report		Dostyk Universal Sports Complex, Almaty

=== Final ===
3 December 2026; 16:00	WSF1	v	WSF2	Dostyk Universal Sports Complex, Almaty
3 December 2026; 16:00		Report		Dostyk Universal Sports Complex, Almaty

== Final standing ==
Rank	Team
1st place, gold medalist(s)	
2nd place, silver medalist(s)	
3rd place, bronze medalist(s)	
4	
5	
6	
7	
8	
9	
10	

Qualified for the 2027 World Women's Handball Championship
