= 1999 Asian Women's Handball Championship =

1999 Asian Championship
Tournament details
- Host country: Japan
- Venue: 1 (in 1 host city)
- Dates: 24–29 January 2000
- Teams: 5 (from 1 confederation)

Final positions
- Champions: South Korea (7th title)
- Runners-up: China
- Third place: Japan
- Fourth place: North Korea

Tournament statistics
- Matches played: 10
- Goals scored: 493 (49.3 per match)
- Top scorer: (Japan) Mineko Tanaka (31)

The 1999 Asian Women's Handball Championship was the seventh Asian Championship, which was taking place from 24 to 30 January 2000 in Kumamoto, Japan. It acted as the Asian qualifying tournament for the 2000 Olympic Games.

== Standings ==
Team	Pld	W	D	L	GF	GA	GD	Pts
South Korea	4	4	0	0	131	84	+47	8
China	4	2	1	1	105	89	+16	5
Japan (H)	4	2	0	2	100	86	+14	4
North Korea	4	1	1	2	103	108	−5	3
Chinese Taipei	4	0	0	4	54	126	−72	0

(H) Hosts

== Results ==
All times are local (UTC+9).

24 January 2000; 17:00	South Korea	36–27	North Korea	Yamaga City Gymnasium, Kumamoto; Referees: Abdullah, Abbas (KUW)
24 January 2000; 17:00	Huh S.Y., Oh S.O. 8	(19–14)	Ko Y.A. 7	Yamaga City Gymnasium, Kumamoto; Referees: Abdullah, Abbas (KUW)
24 January 2000; 17:00	2× (yellow card) 3× (suspension)	Report	3× (yellow card) 2× (suspension)	Yamaga City Gymnasium, Kumamoto; Referees: Abdullah, Abbas (KUW)

24 January 2000; 19:00	Japan	31–7	Chinese Taipei	Yamaga City Gymnasium, Kumamoto; Referees: Husain, Hamdan (JOR)
24 January 2000; 19:00	Komatsu, Kurachi 5	(15–4)	Su C.L. 5	Yamaga City Gymnasium, Kumamoto; Referees: Husain, Hamdan (JOR)
24 January 2000; 19:00	2× (yellow card) 1× (suspension)	Report	3× (yellow card) 3× (suspension)	Yamaga City Gymnasium, Kumamoto; Referees: Husain, Hamdan (JOR)

25 January 2000; 17:00	South Korea	30–20	Japan	Yamaga City Gymnasium, Kumamoto; Referees: Abdullah, Abbas (KUW)
25 January 2000; 17:00	Lee S.E. 12	(15–13)	Tanaka 8	Yamaga City Gymnasium, Kumamoto; Referees: Abdullah, Abbas (KUW)
25 January 2000; 17:00	3× (yellow card) 1× (suspension)	Report	3× (yellow card) 3× (suspension)	Yamaga City Gymnasium, Kumamoto; Referees: Abdullah, Abbas (KUW)

25 January 2000; 19:00	China	21–21	North Korea	Yamaga City Gymnasium, Kumamoto; Referees: Kalin, Korić (SLO)
25 January 2000; 19:00	Zhai C. 6	(8–11)	Pak S.O. 7	Yamaga City Gymnasium, Kumamoto; Referees: Kalin, Korić (SLO)
25 January 2000; 19:00	3× (yellow card) 3× (suspension)	Report	3× (yellow card) 4× (suspension)	Yamaga City Gymnasium, Kumamoto; Referees: Kalin, Korić (SLO)

26 January 2000; 18:00	China	31–14	Chinese Taipei	Yamaga City Gymnasium, Kumamoto; Referees: Hamada, Ogasawara (JPN)
26 January 2000; 18:00	Chen J., Chen L. 6	(16–8)	Kung J.W. 6	Yamaga City Gymnasium, Kumamoto; Referees: Hamada, Ogasawara (JPN)
26 January 2000; 18:00	1× (yellow card) 1× (suspension)	Report	3× (yellow card) 4× (suspension)	Yamaga City Gymnasium, Kumamoto; Referees: Hamada, Ogasawara (JPN)

27 January 2000; 17:00	South Korea	34–8	Chinese Taipei	Yamaga City Gymnasium, Kumamoto; Referees: Husain, Hamdan (JOR)
27 January 2000; 17:00	Jang S.Y. 8	(16–1)	Kung J.W., Huang W.Y. 3	Yamaga City Gymnasium, Kumamoto; Referees: Husain, Hamdan (JOR)
27 January 2000; 17:00	2× (yellow card) 1× (suspension)	Report	3× (yellow card) 1× (suspension)	Yamaga City Gymnasium, Kumamoto; Referees: Husain, Hamdan (JOR)

27 January 2000; 19:00	Japan	26–25	North Korea	Yamaga City Gymnasium, Kumamoto; Referees: Al-Janahi, Al-Rashid (KSA)
27 January 2000; 19:00	Tanaka 9	(11–9)	Ri H.Y. 5	Yamaga City Gymnasium, Kumamoto; Referees: Al-Janahi, Al-Rashid (KSA)
27 January 2000; 19:00	3× (yellow card) 3× (suspension) 1× (red card)	Report	3× (yellow card) 4× (suspension) 1× (red card)	Yamaga City Gymnasium, Kumamoto; Referees: Al-Janahi, Al-Rashid (KSA)

28 January 2000; 18:00	China	24–23	Japan	Yamaga City Gymnasium, Kumamoto; Referees: Kalin, Korić (SLO)
28 January 2000; 18:00	Li J.F. 7	(8–10)	Tanaka 10	Yamaga City Gymnasium, Kumamoto; Referees: Kalin, Korić (SLO)
28 January 2000; 18:00	2× (yellow card) 5× (suspension) 1× (red card)	Report	3× (yellow card) 5× (suspension)	Yamaga City Gymnasium, Kumamoto; Referees: Kalin, Korić (SLO)

29 January 2000; 15:00	South Korea	31–29	China	Yamaga City Gymnasium, Kumamoto; Referees: Abdullah, Abbas (KUW)
29 January 2000; 15:00	Lee S.E. 13	(17–13)	Li J.F. 7	Yamaga City Gymnasium, Kumamoto; Referees: Abdullah, Abbas (KUW)
29 January 2000; 15:00	3× (yellow card) 5× (suspension)	Report	3× (yellow card) 5× (suspension)	Yamaga City Gymnasium, Kumamoto; Referees: Abdullah, Abbas (KUW)

29 January 2000; 17:00	North Korea	30–25	Chinese Taipei	Yamaga City Gymnasium, Kumamoto; Referees: Zhang, Zhang (CHN)
29 January 2000; 17:00	Ri H.Y. 13	(11–11)	Su C.L. 7	Yamaga City Gymnasium, Kumamoto; Referees: Zhang, Zhang (CHN)
29 January 2000; 17:00	3× (yellow card) 2× (suspension)	Report	3× (yellow card) 5× (suspension)	Yamaga City Gymnasium, Kumamoto; Referees: Zhang, Zhang (CHN)

== Final standing ==
Rank	Team
1st place, gold medalist(s)	South Korea
2nd place, silver medalist(s)	China
3rd place, bronze medalist(s)	Japan
4	North Korea
5	Chinese Taipei

Team qualified for the 2000 Summer Olympics
