= Handball Association of the DPR Korea =

North Korean sporting association

Handball Association of the DPR Korea HADPRK
- IOC nation: Democratic People's Republic of Korea (PRK)
- Sport: Handball
- Other sports: Beach handball

HISTORY
- Year of formation: 1974; 51 years ago

AFFILIATIONS
- International federation: International Handball Federation (IHF)
- IHF member since: 1974
- Continental association: Asian Handball Federation
- National Olympic Committee: Olympic Committee of the Democratic People's Republic of Korea

GOVERNING BODY
- President: Ri Kyong Hwa

HEADQUARTERS
- Address: Kumsong Dong 2, Mangyongdae Dist, Pyongyang PO Box 56
- Country: North Korea
- Secretary General: Kwang Su Kim

The Handball Association of the DPR Korea (HADPRK) is the administrative and controlling body for handball and beach handball in the North Korea. Founded in 1974, HADPRK is a member of Asian Handball Federation (AHF) and the International Handball Federation (IHF).

== National teams ==
- North Korea men's national handball team
- North Korea men's national junior handball team
- North Korea women's national handball team
