= Vietnam women's national handball team =

Vietnam

Information
- Association: Vietnam Handball Federation

Colours
1st	2nd

Results

Asian Championship
- Appearances: 2 (First in 2008)
- Best result: 6th (2008, 2017)
- Last updated on Unknown.

The Vietnam women's national handball team is the national team of Vietnam. It is governed by the Vietnam Handball Federation and takes part in international handball competitions.

== Tournament history ==
=== Asian Championship ===
- 2008 – 6th
- 2017 – 6th
