= Hwang Kyun-young =

South Korean handball coach

Hwang Kyun-young (born 28 February 1969) is a South Korean handball coach and former player. He coached the Japanese national team between 2008 and 2012, and participated at the 2009 World Women's Handball Championship in China, and at the 2011 World Women's Handball Championship in Brazil.

He left the team in 2012 as a consequence of not qualifying for the 2012 Olympics.

In addition he has also coached at the Korea National Sport University and several Japanese handball clubs.
