= Kuwait Handball Association =

Handball governing body in Kuwait

Kuwait Handball Association Arabic: الاتحاد الكويتي لكرة اليد KHA
- IOC nation: State of Kuwait (KUW)
- Sport: Handball
- Other sports: Beach handball
- Official website: www.kha-kuwait.com

HISTORY
- Year of formation: 17 April 1966; 58 years ago

DEMOGRAPHICS
- Membership size: 16 member clubs

AFFILIATIONS
- International federation: International Handball Federation (IHF)
- IHF member since: 1970
- Continental association: Asian Handball Federation
- National Olympic Committee: Kuwait Olympic Committee
- Member of NOC since: 6 June 1966
- Other affiliation(s): West Asian Handball Federation

GOVERNING BODY
- President: Naser Saleh Abu Marzouq (Kuwait)

HEADQUARTERS
- Address: 2nd Ring Road Street P.O. Box: 5925 KW-13060 Safat
- Country: Kuwait
- Secretary General: Qayed Hamoud Al-Adwani
- Vice-President: Shabib Saad Al-Hajri
- Treasurer: Faisal Ali Baqer
- Deputy Secretary General: Abdullah Jasem Mohammad Al-Theyab

The Kuwait Handball Association (Arabic: الاتحاد الكويتي لكرة اليد) (KHA) is the administrative and controlling body for handball and beach handball in State of Kuwait. KHA is a founder member of the Asian Handball Federation (AHF) and member of the International Handball Federation (IHF) since 1970. Handball in Kuwait was founded by Sheikh Fahad Al-Ahmed Al-Jaber Al-Sabah, who is a member of House of Sabah, the ruling family of Kuwait. He was also the first President of KHA.

== KHA Presidents ==
S. No.	Name	Term
1.	Sheikh Fahad Al-Ahmed Al-Jaber Al-Sabah	1966 – ?
?	?	? – ?
?	Salem Al-Yamani	1969 – 1970
?	?	? – ?
?	Khalid Al-Harban	1973 – 1976
?	?	? – ?
?	Mahli Farhoud	1980 – 1982
?	Sheikh Salem Al-Fahad	1982 – 1983
?	Abdul Mohsen Al-Enezi	1983 – 1984
?	Farid Al-Ajeel	1985 – 1986
?	Sheikh Talal Al-Khaled Al-Ahmad Al-Sabah	1986 – 1987
?	Sheikh Salem Al-Fahad	1987 – 1988
?	Sheikh Ahmed Al-Fahad Al-Ahmed Al-Sabah	1988 – 1989
?	?	? – ?
?	Naser Saleh Abu Marzouq	1991 – Till date

== National teams ==
- Kuwait men's national handball team
- Kuwait men's national junior handball team
- Kuwait men's national youth handball team
- Kuwait women's national handball team
- Kuwait women's junior national handball team
- Kuwait women's youth national handball team

== Competitions hosted ==
- 2020 Asian Men's Handball Championship
- 2018 Asian Men's Club League Handball Championship
- 2007 Asian Men's Club League Handball Championship
- 2002 West Asian Games
- 2000 Asian Men's Club League Handball Championship
- 1995 Asian Men's Handball Championship
- 1977 Asian Men's Handball Championship

== Affiliated members ==
- Al-Arabi SC
- Burgan SC
- Al-Fahaheel FC
- Al-Jahra SC
- Kazma SC
- Khaitan SC
- Kuwait SC
- Al-Nasr SC
- Qadsia SC
- Al-Qurain SC
- Al Sahel SC
- Al-Salmiya SC
- Al-Shabab SC
- Al-Sulaibikhat SC
- Al Tadhamon SC
- Al-Yarmouk SC
