= Indonesia women's national handball team =

Indonesia

Information
- Association: Indonesia Handball Association

Colours
1st	2nd

Results

Asian Championship
- Appearances: 2 (First in 2012)
- Best result: 9th (2015)
- Last updated on Unknown.

The Indonesia women's national handball team is the national team of Indonesia. It is governed by the Indonesia Handball Association and takes part in international handball competitions.

== Tournament history ==
=== Asian Championship ===
- 2012 – 11th
- 2015 – 9th
