= Olympic Committee of the Democratic People's Republic of Korea =

Sports body of North Korea

- Country: North Korea
- Code: PRK
- Created: 1920 (unified); 1953 (separate)
- Recognized: 1957
- Headquarters: P.O. Box 56 Kumsong-dong 2 Kwangbok Street Mangyongdae District, Pyongyang
- President: Kim Il-guk

The Olympic Committee of the Democratic People's Republic of Korea (Korean: 조선민주주의인민공화국 올림픽 위원회; Hanja: 朝鮮民主主義人民共和國 올림픽 委員會; IOC code: PRK) is the National Olympic Committee (NOC) representing North Korea (competing either as DPR Korea or as the country's full official name, the Democratic People's Republic of Korea).

It is a member of the Olympic Council of Asia (OCA), and of the Association of National Olympic Committees (ANOC). It is based in Kwangbok Street, Kumsong-dong, Mangyongdae District, Pyongyang. Its chairman is Kim Il-guk and its Secretary General is Son Kwang-ho.

== History ==
Old logo

This Olympic Committee can be traced to the formation of the Joseon Sports Council established on 13 July 1920, and it made Korean national competitions of each sport including All Joseon Football Tournament. The competitions were combined as the All Joseon Sport Games (currently Korean National Sports Festival) in 1934, and the combined competition was held every autumn. However, the Joseon Sports Council was forcibly dissolved by Japan on 4 July 1938, and Korean sporting activities were restricted until the end of the Japanese occupation.

The council was revived after Korean independence in 1945, and joined the IOC on 20 June 1947. It also established the Korean Olympic Committee (KOC) to prepare for the Olympic Games in that year. However, due to the division of Korea, the Soviet-backed regime in northern Korea displayed dissatisfaction with this arrangement, and repeatedly called for the creation of a North Korean NOC. The IOC declined these pleas on the grounds that there could be only one NOC per country.

Regardless of the lack of recognition, the Olympic Committee of the Democratic People's Republic of Korea was founded in 1953 and it applied to join the IOC in June 1956.

In the 1957 session of the IOC, the Olympic Committee of the USSR asked the IOC to provisionally recognize the North Korean NOC on the grounds that the East German NOC had been admitted alongside the Olympic Committee of West Germany. Recognition was to be done under the condition that the two Korean NOCs would agree to send a unified team to 1960 Summer Olympics in Rome, but the plans failed due to opposition by the South's Korean Olympic Committee. The matter of a unified team was debated over the following sessions, and lobbied by the Bulgarian and Romanian NOCs, and in 1962 the IOC finally conferred provisional recognition on the North Korean NOC.

Talks about a unified team continued in 1963, but these talks failed after the NOCs could agree on nothing but the flag, which was to consist of the word "Korea" under the Olympic rings. North Korea joined the Soviet-led boycott of the 1984 Summer Olympics in Los Angeles. Between 1985 and 1988 the NOCs negotiated about co-hosting the 1988 Summer Olympics. The negotiations failed, resulting in North Korea boycotting the Games held in Seoul, South Korea.

On 8 September 2021, the IOC Executive Board suspended the Olympic Committee of the Democratic People's Republic of Korea (North Korea) through at least the end of 2022 for violations of the Olympic Charter, over its refusal to send athletes to the 2020 Summer Olympics in Tokyo due to COVID-19 pandemic-related concerns. There has been speculation about whether the IOC was also intending to send a message to nations considering a boycott of the 2022 Winter Olympics in Beijing, that they could be banned from participation in future Olympic Games if they chose to boycott this edition. However, North Korean Ministry of Sports and the National Olympic Committee said in a letter to the 2022 Beijing Winter Olympics Organizing Committee, the Chinese Olympic Committee, and the General Administration of Sport of China on 7 January 2022 that "Due to the "action of hostile forces" and the COVID-19 pandemic, they would not be able to participate in the 2022 Beijing Winter Olympics." In addition, the North Korean Olympic Committee said "supports all the work of our comrades in China to host a grand and wonderful Olympics. The United States and its followers are plotting anti-Chinese conspiracies to obstruct the successful hosting of the Olympics, but this is an insult to the spirit of the Olympic Charter and an act to damage China's international image. We firmly oppose and reject these actions."

== National body members ==
The following national bodies have membership in the Committee:

- Amateur Athletic Association of DPR of Korea
- Amateur Basketball Association of DPR Korea
- Amateur Boxing Association of DPR Korea
- Amateur Swimming Association of D.P.R. Korea
- Amateur Wrestling Association of the Democratic People's Republic of Korea
- Badminton Association of the Democratic People's Republic of Korea
- Baseball and Softball Association of DPR Korea
- Democratic People's Republic of Korea Weightlifting Association
- DPR Korea Football Association
- Gymnastics Association of the Democratic People's Republic of Korea
- Handball Association of the DPR Korea
- Ice Hockey Association of the DPR Korea
- Judo Association of the Democratic People's Republic of Korea
- PRK Korea Rowing Federation
- Shooting Association of DPR Korea
- Skating Association of the Democratic People's Republic of Korea
- Table Tennis Association of the Democratic People's Republic of Korea
- Tennis Association of DPR of Korea
- The Volleyball Association of the D.P.R. Korea

== 2020 unified Korea team and 2032 co-host bid with South Korea ==
On November 2, 2018, officials from both North and South Korea announced that their countries would participate at the 2020 Summer Olympics, held in Tokyo, Japan, as a unified team. The officials from both Koreas also announced that the letters they would send to the IOC regarding their bids for hosting the 2032 Summer Olympics would also consist of co-host bids so that the Olympic activities would take place in both nations if their bids were accepted as well.

== See also ==
- North Korea at the Olympics
- North Korea at the Paralympics
- North Korea at the Asian Games
