= 2012 Asian Women's Handball Championship =

2012 Asian Championship

Tournament details
- Host country: Indonesia
- Venue: 1 (in 1 host city)
- Dates: 7–16 December
- Teams: 12 (from 1 confederation)

Final positions
- Champions: South Korea (11th title)
- Runners-up: China
- Third place: Japan
- Fourth place: Kazakhstan

Tournament statistics
- Matches played: 42
- Goals scored: 2,385 (56.79 per match)

The 2012 Asian Women's Handball Championship was the 14th Asian Championship, which took place from 7 to 16 December 2012 in Yogyakarta, Indonesia. It acted as the Asian qualifying tournament for the 2013 World Women's Handball Championship in Serbia.

== Draw ==
Group A	Group B
South Korea; China; North Korea; Iran; Indonesia; Chinese Taipei	Kazakhstan; Japan; Uzbekistan; Turkmenistan; Kuwait; India

== Preliminary round ==
All times are local (UTC+7).

=== Group A ===
Team	Pld	W	D	L	GF	GA	GD	Pts
South Korea	5	5	0	0	207	72	+135	10
China	5	4	0	1	191	81	+110	8
North Korea	5	3	0	2	188	107	+81	6
Chinese Taipei	5	2	0	3	117	141	−24	4
Iran	5	1	0	4	129	147	−18	2
Indonesia (H)	5	0	0	5	15	299	−284	0

(H) Hosts

7 December 2012; 14:00	Chinese Taipei	7–40	South Korea	Gedung Olah Raga UNY, Yogyakarta
7 December 2012; 14:00		(3–18)		Gedung Olah Raga UNY, Yogyakarta

7 December 2012; 18:00	Iran	53–4	Indonesia	Gedung Olah Raga UNY, Yogyakarta
7 December 2012; 18:00		(24–1)		Gedung Olah Raga UNY, Yogyakarta

7 December 2012; 20:00	China	29–20	North Korea	Gedung Olah Raga UNY, Yogyakarta
7 December 2012; 20:00		(13–6)		Gedung Olah Raga UNY, Yogyakarta

8 December 2012; 14:00	China	31–14	Chinese Taipei	Gedung Olah Raga UNY, Yogyakarta
8 December 2012; 14:00		(18–7)		Gedung Olah Raga UNY, Yogyakarta

8 December 2012; 16:00	North Korea	36–20	Iran	Gedung Olah Raga UNY, Yogyakarta
8 December 2012; 16:00		(18–7)		Gedung Olah Raga UNY, Yogyakarta

8 December 2012; 18:00	South Korea	63–3	Indonesia	Gedung Olah Raga UNY, Yogyakarta
8 December 2012; 18:00		(34–1)		Gedung Olah Raga UNY, Yogyakarta

9 December 2012; 10:00	Indonesia	2–66	China	Gedung Olah Raga UNY, Yogyakarta
9 December 2012; 10:00		(1–32)		Gedung Olah Raga UNY, Yogyakarta

9 December 2012; 14:00	South Korea	41–16	Iran	Gedung Olah Raga UNY, Yogyakarta
9 December 2012; 14:00		(22–8)		Gedung Olah Raga UNY, Yogyakarta

9 December 2012; 18:00	North Korea	41–23	Chinese Taipei	Gedung Olah Raga UNY, Yogyakarta
9 December 2012; 18:00		(22–10)		Gedung Olah Raga UNY, Yogyakarta

11 December 2012; 12:00	Iran	15–37	China	Gedung Olah Raga UNY, Yogyakarta
11 December 2012; 12:00		(8–21)		Gedung Olah Raga UNY, Yogyakarta

11 December 2012; 16:00	Chinese Taipei	44–4	Indonesia	Gedung Olah Raga UNY, Yogyakarta
11 December 2012; 16:00		(23–1)		Gedung Olah Raga UNY, Yogyakarta

11 December 2012; 20:00	North Korea	18–33	South Korea	Gedung Olah Raga UNY, Yogyakarta
11 December 2012; 20:00		(4–18)		Gedung Olah Raga UNY, Yogyakarta

12 December 2012; 10:00	Iran	25–29	Chinese Taipei	Gedung Olah Raga UNY, Yogyakarta
12 December 2012; 10:00		(16–15)		Gedung Olah Raga UNY, Yogyakarta

12 December 2012; 14:00	Indonesia	2–73	North Korea	Gedung Olah Raga UNY, Yogyakarta
12 December 2012; 14:00		(1–39)		Gedung Olah Raga UNY, Yogyakarta

12 December 2012; 18:00	South Korea	30–28	China	Gedung Olah Raga UNY, Yogyakarta
12 December 2012; 18:00		(17–16)		Gedung Olah Raga UNY, Yogyakarta

=== Group B ===
Team	Pld	W	D	L	GF	GA	GD	Pts
Japan	5	5	0	0	212	77	+135	10
Kazakhstan	5	4	0	1	208	90	+118	8
Uzbekistan	5	3	0	2	183	114	+69	6
India	5	2	0	3	147	157	−10	4
Turkmenistan	5	1	0	4	104	128	−24	2
Kuwait	5	0	0	5	20	308	−288	0

7 December 2012; 12:00	Kazakhstan	42–17	India	Gedung Olah Raga UNY, Yogyakarta
7 December 2012; 12:00		(23–8)		Gedung Olah Raga UNY, Yogyakarta

7 December 2012; 16:00	Japan	69–1	Kuwait	Gedung Olah Raga UNY, Yogyakarta
7 December 2012; 16:00		(39–1)		Gedung Olah Raga UNY, Yogyakarta

8 December 2012; 10:00	Kuwait	1–70	Kazakhstan	Gedung Olah Raga UNY, Yogyakarta
8 December 2012; 10:00		(1–34)		Gedung Olah Raga UNY, Yogyakarta

8 December 2012; 12:00	Turkmenistan	25–26	India	Gedung Olah Raga UNY, Yogyakarta
8 December 2012; 12:00		(13–10)		Gedung Olah Raga UNY, Yogyakarta

8 December 2012; 20:00	Japan	31–27	Uzbekistan	Gedung Olah Raga UNY, Yogyakarta
8 December 2012; 20:00		(20–13)		Gedung Olah Raga UNY, Yogyakarta

9 December 2012; 12:00	Kazakhstan	34–15	Turkmenistan	Gedung Olah Raga UNY, Yogyakarta
9 December 2012; 12:00		(13–9)		Gedung Olah Raga UNY, Yogyakarta

9 December 2012; 16:00	India	18–48	Japan	Gedung Olah Raga UNY, Yogyakarta
9 December 2012; 16:00		(11–23)		Gedung Olah Raga UNY, Yogyakarta

9 December 2012; 20:00	Uzbekistan	64–7	Kuwait	Gedung Olah Raga UNY, Yogyakarta
9 December 2012; 20:00		(32–3)		Gedung Olah Raga UNY, Yogyakarta

10 December 2012; 10:00	Uzbekistan	26–14	Turkmenistan	Gedung Olah Raga UNY, Yogyakarta
10 December 2012; 10:00		(16–11)		Gedung Olah Raga UNY, Yogyakarta

11 December 2012; 10:00	Turkmenistan	8–37	Japan	Gedung Olah Raga UNY, Yogyakarta
11 December 2012; 10:00		(4–21)		Gedung Olah Raga UNY, Yogyakarta

11 December 2012; 14:00	Kuwait	6–63	India	Gedung Olah Raga UNY, Yogyakarta
11 December 2012; 14:00		(2–27)		Gedung Olah Raga UNY, Yogyakarta

11 December 2012; 18:00	Uzbekistan	30–39	Kazakhstan	Gedung Olah Raga UNY, Yogyakarta
11 December 2012; 18:00		(16–18)		Gedung Olah Raga UNY, Yogyakarta

12 December 2012; 12:00	India	23–36	Uzbekistan	Gedung Olah Raga UNY, Yogyakarta
12 December 2012; 12:00		(10–21)		Gedung Olah Raga UNY, Yogyakarta

12 December 2012; 16:00	Turkmenistan	42–5	Kuwait	Gedung Olah Raga UNY, Yogyakarta
12 December 2012; 16:00		(20–1)		Gedung Olah Raga UNY, Yogyakarta

12 December 2012; 20:00	Kazakhstan	23–27	Japan	Gedung Olah Raga UNY, Yogyakarta
12 December 2012; 20:00		(12–11)		Gedung Olah Raga UNY, Yogyakarta

== Placement 9th–12th ==
Semifinals
14 December – Yogyakarta
Iran	54
Kuwait	5
14 December – Yogyakarta
Turkmenistan	40
Indonesia	9

9th/10th
15 December – Yogyakarta
Iran	23
Turkmenistan	18
11th/12th
15 December – Yogyakarta
Kuwait	21
Indonesia	26

=== 9th–12th semifinals ===
14 December 2012; 10:00	Iran	53–5	Kuwait	Gedung Olah Raga UNY, Yogyakarta
14 December 2012; 10:00		(27–4)		Gedung Olah Raga UNY, Yogyakarta

14 December 2012; 12:00	Turkmenistan	40–9	Indonesia	Gedung Olah Raga UNY, Yogyakarta
14 December 2012; 12:00		(23–1)		Gedung Olah Raga UNY, Yogyakarta

=== 11th/12th ===
15 December 2012; 14:00	Kuwait	21–26	Indonesia	Gedung Olah Raga UNY, Yogyakarta
15 December 2012; 14:00		(8–13)		Gedung Olah Raga UNY, Yogyakarta

=== 9th/10th ===
15 December 2012; 16:00	Iran	23–18	Turkmenistan	Gedung Olah Raga UNY, Yogyakarta
15 December 2012; 16:00		(12–11)		Gedung Olah Raga UNY, Yogyakarta

== Placement 5th–8th ==
Semifinals
14 December – Yogyakarta
North Korea	46
India	24
14 December – Yogyakarta
Uzbekistan	32
Chinese Taipei	23

5th/6th
15 December – Yogyakarta
North Korea	41
Uzbekistan	28
7th/8th
15 December – Yogyakarta
India	24
Chinese Taipei	40

=== 5th–8th semifinals ===
14 December 2012; 14:00	North Korea	46–24	India	Gedung Olah Raga UNY, Yogyakarta
14 December 2012; 14:00		(21–12)		Gedung Olah Raga UNY, Yogyakarta

14 December 2012; 16:00	Uzbekistan	32–23	Chinese Taipei	Gedung Olah Raga UNY, Yogyakarta
14 December 2012; 16:00		(19–9)		Gedung Olah Raga UNY, Yogyakarta

=== 7th/8th ===
15 December 2012; 18:00	India	24–40	Chinese Taipei	Gedung Olah Raga UNY, Yogyakarta
15 December 2012; 18:00		(11–21)		Gedung Olah Raga UNY, Yogyakarta

=== 5th/6th ===
15 December 2012; 20:00	North Korea	41–28	Uzbekistan	Gedung Olah Raga UNY, Yogyakarta
15 December 2012; 20:00		(21–13)		Gedung Olah Raga UNY, Yogyakarta

== Final round ==
Semifinals
14 December – Yogyakarta
South Korea	34
Kazakhstan	21
14 December – Yogyakarta
Japan	25
China	28

Gold medal match
16 December – Yogyakarta
South Korea	40
China	22
Bronze medal match
16 December – Yogyakarta
Kazakhstan	20
Japan	21

=== Semifinals ===
14 December 2012; 18:00	South Korea	34–21	Kazakhstan	Gedung Olah Raga UNY, Yogyakarta
14 December 2012; 18:00		(16–10)		Gedung Olah Raga UNY, Yogyakarta

14 December 2012; 20:00	Japan	25–28	China	Gedung Olah Raga UNY, Yogyakarta
14 December 2012; 20:00		(12–13)		Gedung Olah Raga UNY, Yogyakarta

=== Bronze medal match ===
16 December 2012; 18:00	Kazakhstan	20–21	Japan	Gedung Olah Raga UNY, Yogyakarta
16 December 2012; 18:00		(8–7)		Gedung Olah Raga UNY, Yogyakarta

=== Gold medal match ===
16 December 2012; 20:00	South Korea	40–22	China	Gedung Olah Raga UNY, Yogyakarta
16 December 2012; 20:00		(18–12)		Gedung Olah Raga UNY, Yogyakarta

== Final standing ==
Rank	Team
1st place, gold medalist(s)	South Korea
2nd place, silver medalist(s)	China
3rd place, bronze medalist(s)	Japan
4	Kazakhstan
5	North Korea
6	Uzbekistan
7	Chinese Taipei
8	India
9	Iran
10	Turkmenistan
11	Indonesia
12	Kuwait

Team qualified for the 2013 World Championship
