= 1991 Asian Women's Handball Championship =

1991 Asian Championship
Tournament details
- Host country: Japan
- Venue: 1 (in 1 host city)
- Dates: 22–31 August
- Teams: 5 (from 1 confederation)

Final positions
- Champions: South Korea (3rd title)
- Runners-up: Japan
- Third place: China
- Fourth place: North Korea

Tournament statistics
- Matches played: 10
- Goals scored: 503 (50.3 per match)

The 1991 Asian Women's Handball Championship, the third Asian Championship, which was taking place from 22 to 31 August 1991 in Hiroshima, Japan. It acted as the Asian qualifying tournament for the 1992 Summer Olympics.

South Korea won their third title, Japan finishing 2nd and China 3rd.

== Standings ==
| Team | Pld | W | D | L | GF | GA | GD | Pts |
|---|---|---|---|---|---|---|---|---|
| South Korea | 4 | 4 | 0 | 0 | 135 | 82 | +53 | 8 |
| Japan (H) | 4 | 3 | 0 | 1 | 104 | 83 | +21 | 6 |
| China | 4 | 2 | 0 | 2 | 101 | 84 | +17 | 4 |
| North Korea | 4 | 1 | 0 | 3 | 80 | 113 | −33 | 2 |
| Chinese Taipei | 4 | 0 | 0 | 4 | 83 | 141 | −58 | 0 |

(H) Hosts

== Results ==
| South Korea | 27–18 | China | Hiroshima |

| Japan | 36–18 | Chinese Taipei | Hiroshima |
| | JHA | | Hiroshima |

| North Korea | 19–27 | China | Hiroshima |

| Japan | 23–14 | North Korea | Hiroshima |
| | JHA | | Hiroshima |

| China | 38–18 | Chinese Taipei | Hiroshima |

| North Korea | 19–36 | South Korea | Hiroshima |

| 28 August 1991 | Chinese Taipei | 27–28 | North Korea | Hiroshima |

| 28 August 1991 | South Korea | 33–25 | Japan | Hiroshima |
| 28 August 1991 | | JHA | | Hiroshima |

| 31 August 1991 | China | 18–20 | Japan | Hiroshima |
| 31 August 1991 | | JHA | | Hiroshima |

| 31 August 1991 | Chinese Taipei | 20–39 | South Korea | Hiroshima |

== Final ranking ==
Final ranking is:

| Rank | Team |
|---|---|
| 1st place, gold medalist(s) | South Korea |
| 2nd place, silver medalist(s) | Japan |
| 3rd place, bronze medalist(s) | China |
| 4 | North Korea |
| 5 | Chinese Taipei |

| Team qualified for the 1992 Summer Olympics |
