= Ulrik Kirkely =

Danish handball coach (born 1972)

Personal information
- Nationality: Danish
- Born: 5 January 1972 (age 54) Denmark

Sport
- Sport: Handball

Senior clubs
- Years: Team
- –: GOG Håndbold
- –: Gudme HK
- –: Tved

Teams managed
- 2010–2011: Bahrain (men)
- 2011–2012: Vejen EH
- 2011–2012: Saudi Arabia (men)
- 2012–2015: Denmark (women) (assistant)
- 2015: Randers HK
- 2015–2017: Odense Håndbold
- 2017–2021: Japan (women)
- 2020–2023: Odense Håndbold
- 2023–2024: Győri ETO KC

Ulrik Kirkely (born 5 January 1972) is a Danish handball coach and former handball player.

As a player he played for Danish club GOG Håndbold, where he won the 1997/98 EHF Cup Winners' Cup.

He coached the Japanese national team between 2017 and 2021. The major tournaments where the team participated in that phase include the 2017 World Women's Handball Championship, the 2019 World Women's Handball Championship and the 2020 Summer Olympics.

== Coaching career ==
He has previously coached Tved, Gudme HK, Team Sydhavsøerne and KIF Vejen in Denmark.

Afterwards he has been the head coach of both Bahrains and Saudi Arabia's men's teams. He managed to reach the World Championship with both teams.

He then became the assistant coach on the Denmark women's national team under Jan Pytlick. He was in this position from 2012 to 2015.

In February 2015 he became the temporary head coach at Randers HK, after the club had fired their previous manager, Mads Brandt. A little more than a month later he announced, that he would not continue in the position after the end of the season.

From 2015 to 2017 he was once again the assistant coach to Pytlick, this time at the Danish club Odense Håndbold. He left this position to take over as the coach of the Japanese women's national team.

From 2020 to 2023 he was the head coach of Odense Håndbold, where he had previously been the assistant. In this period he won the Danish league twice and the Danish Cup once.

In December 2022 he signed a contract with Hungarian top club Győri Audi ETO KC, starting from the 2023-24 season. He was fired from this position after a single season after he lost the final of the Hungarian cup. His assistant at Gyor, Danish Kristian Danielsen, was also fired at the same time.

== Achievements ==
As manager

Odense

- Danish League:
  - Winner: 2021, 2022
- Danish Cup
  - Winner: 2020
