= Mineko Tanaka =

Japanese handball player (born 1975)

Personal information
- Nationality: Japanese
- Born: 14 January 1975 (age 51)
- Height: 1.60 m (5 ft 3 in)

Sport
- Sport: Handball
- Position: Centre back
- Current club: Osaka Lovvits
- Number: 5
National team
Years	Team	Apps	(Gls)
–	Japan	143	(607)

Mineko Tanaka (田中 美音子, Tanaka Mineko; born 14 January 1975) is a Japanese handball player who plays for the club Osaka Lovvits. She is also member of the Japanese national team. She competed at the 2005 World Women's Handball Championship in Russia, and at the 2015 World Women's Handball Championship in Denmark.
