= Chinese Taipei women's national handball team =

Chinese Taipei

Information
- Association: Chinese Taipei Handball Association

Colours
1st	2nd

Results

Asian Championship
- Appearances: 11 (First in 1987)
- Best result: 4th (1989, 1995, 2004)
- Last updated on Unknown.

The Chinese Taipei women's national handball team is the national team of Chinese Taipei. It is governed by the Chinese Taipei Handball Association and takes part in international handball competitions.

== Tournament history ==
=== Asian Championship ===
- 1987 – 5th
- 1989 – 4th
- 1991 – 5th
- 1993 – 6th
- 1995 – 4th
- 1997 – 5th
- 1999 – 5th
- 2000 – 7th
- 2002 – 5th
- 2004 – 4th
- 2012 – 7th
