= Hong Kong women's national handball team =

Hong Kong

Information
- Association: Handball Association of Hong Kong
- Coach: Ip Shi Yan

Colours
| 1st | 2nd |

Results

Asian Championship
- Appearances: 7 (First in 1989)
- Best result: 5th (1989)
- Last updated on Unknown.

The Hong Kong women's national handball team is the national team of Hong Kong. It is governed by the Handball Association of Hong Kong and takes part in international handball competitions.

== Asian Championship record ==
- 1989 – 5th
- 2015 – 8th
- 2017 – 8th
- 2018 – 7th
- 2021 – 6th
- 2022 – 9th
- 2024 – 7th
- 2026 – Qualified
