= China women's national handball team =

China

Information
- Association: Chinese Handball Association
- Coach: Yérime Sylla
- Assistant coach: Zhao Xin; Sándor Zsadányi

Colours
1st	2nd

Results

Summer Olympics
- Appearances: 5 (First in 1984)
- Best result: (bronze) Bronze Medal (1984)

World Championship
- Appearances: 19 (First in 1986)
- Best result: 8th (1990)

Asian Championship
- Appearances: 19 (First in 1987)
- Best result: 2nd (1987, 1989, 1993, 1995, 1997, 1999, 2004, 2006, 2008, 2012)
- Last updated on Unknown.

China women's national handball team
Medal record

Olympic Games
Bronze medal – third place	1984 Los Angeles	Team

Asian Games
Gold medal – first place	2010 Guangzhou	Team
Silver medal – second place	1990 Beijing	Team
Silver medal – second place	2018 Jakarta-Palembang	Team
Bronze medal – third place	1994 Hiroshima	Team
Bronze medal – third place	2002 Busan	Team
Bronze medal – third place	2022 Hangzhou	Team

Asian Championship
Silver medal – second place	1987 Amman	
Silver medal – second place	1989 Beijing	
Silver medal – second place	1993 Shantou	
Silver medal – second place	1995 Seoul	
Silver medal – second place	1997 Amman	
Silver medal – second place	1999 Kumamoto	
Silver medal – second place	2004 Hiroshima	
Silver medal – second place	2006 Guangzhou	
Silver medal – second place	2008 Bangkok	
Silver medal – second place	2012 Yogyacarta	
Bronze medal – third place	1991 Hiroshima	
Bronze medal – third place	2002 Almaty	
Bronze medal – third place	2010 Almaty	
Bronze medal – third place	2015 Jakarta	
Bronze medal – third place	2017 Suwon	
Bronze medal – third place	2018 Japan	
Bronze medal – third place	2022 Incheon/Seoul	

The China women's national handball team is the national team of People's Republic of China. It is governed by the China Handball Federation and takes part in international handball competitions.

== Results ==
=== Olympic Games ===
Year	Position	Pld	W	D	L	GS	GA	+/-
(Canada) 1976	Did not qualify							
(Soviet Union) 1980	Did not qualify							
(United States) 1984	(bronze) Bronze Medal	5	2	1	2	112	115	-3
(South Korea) 1988	6th	5	2	0	3	128	106	+22
(Spain) 1992	Did not qualify							
(United States) 1996	5th	4	2	0	2	99	109	-10
(Australia) 2000	Did not qualify							
(Greece) 2004	8th	7	2	0	5	182	177	+5
(China) 2008	6th	8	3	0	5	187	199	-12
(Australia) 2012	Did not qualify							
(United Kingdom) 2016	Did not qualify							
(Japan) 2020	Did not qualify							
(France) 2024	Did not qualify							
Total	5/13	29	11	1	17	708	706	-2

=== World Championship ===
- 1986 – 9th
- 1990 – 8th
- 1993 – 14th
- 1995 – 13th
- 1997 – 22nd
- 1999 – 18th
- 2001 – 11th
- 2003 – 19th
- 2005 – 17th
- 2007 – 21st
- 2009 – 12th
- 2011 – 21st
- 2013 – 18th
- 2015 – 17th
- 2017 – 22nd
- 2019 – 23rd
- 2021 – 32nd
- 2023 – 28th
- 2025 – 26th

=== Asian Games ===
- 1990 – (silver) Silver Medal
- 1994 – (bronze) Bronze Medal
- 1998 – 4th
- 2002 – (bronze) Bronze Medal
- 2006 – 4th
- 2010 – (gold) Gold Medal
- 2014 – 4th
- 2018 – (silver) Silver Medal
- 2022 – (bronze) Bronze Medal

=== Asian Championship ===
- 1987 – (silver) Silver Medal
- 1989 – (silver) Silver Medal
- 1991 – (bronze) Bronze Medal
- 1993 – (silver) Silver Medal
- 1995 – (silver) Silver Medal
- 1997 – (silver) Silver Medal
- 1999 – (silver) Silver Medal
- 2000 – 4th
- 2002 – (bronze) Bronze Medal
- 2004 – (silver) Silver Medal
- 2006 – (silver) Silver Medal
- 2008 – (silver) Silver Medal
- 2010 – (bronze) Bronze Medal
- 2012 – (silver) Silver Medal
- 2015 – (bronze) Bronze Medal
- 2017 – (bronze) Bronze Medal
- 2018 – (bronze) Bronze Medal
- 2022 – (bronze) Bronze Medal
- 2024 – 5th
- 2026 – Qualified

== Current squad ==
Roster for the 2025 World Women's Handball Championship.

Head coach: (France) Yérime Sylla

No.	Pos.	Name	Date of birth (age)	Height	App.	Goals	Club
1	GK	Lu Chang	6 April 1998 (age 28)	1.86 m	44	0	(China) Shandong Handball
3	LB	Pan Fengying	26 November 2006 (age 19)	1.80 m	0	0	(China) Beijing Handball
7	LW	Zhang Siyu	19 January 2004 (age 22)	1.63 m	0	0	(China) Anhui Handball
8	CB	Liang Jing	14 April 2006 (age 20)	1.73 m	0	0	(China) Anhui Handball
9	P	Jiang Xintong	30 August 1990 (age 36)	1.75 m	0	0	(China) Shanghai Handball
10	RW	Shi Zihan	31 October 2005 (age 21)	1.72 m	0	0	(China) Jiangsu Handball
11	RB	Liu Chan	10 August 1998 (age 28)	1.80 m	30	37	(China) Shandong Handball
12	GK	Yang Wenqi	8 December 2005 (age 20)	1.79 m	0	0	(China) Anhui Handball
13	LB	Wei Xinxin	11 June 2006 (age 20)	1.62 m	0	0	(China) Shanghai Handball
16	GK	Huang Sitong	20 December 2006 (age 19)	1.77 m	13	0	(China) Jiangsu Handball
18	RB	Wang Jingjing	2 April 2005 (age 21)	1.74 m	0	0	(China) Anhui Handball
19	RB	Zhuo Ziyi	8 December 2005 (age 20)	1.75 m	0	0	(China) Beijing Handball
21	RW	Zhang Pingping	15 November 1999 (age 26)	1.70 m	0	0	(China) Shanghai Handball
23	P	Li Yuanmeng	24 December 2002 (age 23)	1.75 m	0	0	(China) Jiangsu Handball
24	CB	Qu Wenna	2 January 2002 (age 24)	1.73 m	13	5	(China) Jiangsu Handball
28	CB	Liu Xuedan	13 October 2005 (age 21)	1.72 m	14	45	(China) Anhui Handball
32	P	Li Ziai	23 December 2006 (age 19)	1.76 m	0	0	(China) Jiangsu Handball
53	LW	Liu Yuting	18 July 2004 (age 22)	1.68 m	25	51	(China) Anhui Handball
3	LW	Liu Yuting	18 July 2004 (age 22)	1.68 m	4	4	(China) Anhui Handball
