= Turkmenistan women's national handball team =

Turkmenistan

Information
- Association: Handball Federation of Turkmenistan

Colours
1st	2nd

Results

Asian Championship
- Appearances: 2 (First in 2002)
- Best result: 6th (2002)
- Last updated on Unknown.

The Turkmenistan women's national handball team is the national team of Turkmenistan. It is governed by the Handball Federation of Turkmenistan and takes part in international handball competitions.

== Tournament history ==
=== Asian Championship ===
- 2002 – 6th
- 2012 – 10th
