= 2004 Asian Women's Handball Championship =

2004 Asian Championship
Tournament details
- Host country: Japan
- Venue(s): 1 (in 1 host city)
- Dates: 23–25 July
- Teams: 4 (from 1 confederation)

Final positions
- Champions: Japan (1st title)
- Runners-up: China
- Third place: South Korea
- Fourth place: Chinese Taipei

Tournament statistics
- Matches played: 6
- Goals scored: 342 (57 per match)
- Top scorer(s): (South Korea) Hu Ha-na (29)

The 2004 Asian Women's Handball Championship, the tenth Asian Championship, which was taking place from 23 to 25 July 2004 in Hiroshima, Japan. It acted as the Asian qualifying tournament for the 2005 World Women's Handball Championship.

== Standings ==
Team	Pld	W	D	L	GF	GA	GD	Pts
Japan (H)	3	3	0	0	96	64	+32	6
China	3	2	0	1	91	83	+8	4
South Korea	3	1	0	2	82	84	−2	2
Chinese Taipei	3	0	0	3	73	111	−38	0

(H) Hosts

== Results ==
All times are local (UTC+9).

23 July 2004; 17:00	South Korea	34–27	Chinese Taipei	Higashiku Sports Center, Hiroshima; Referees: Hamada, Ogasawara (JPN)
23 July 2004; 17:00	Hu H.N. 12	(17–16)	Chen Y.J. 8	Higashiku Sports Center, Hiroshima; Referees: Hamada, Ogasawara (JPN)
23 July 2004; 17:00	2× (yellow card) 1× (suspension)	Report	3× (yellow card) 8× (suspension)	Higashiku Sports Center, Hiroshima; Referees: Hamada, Ogasawara (JPN)

23 July 2004; 18:40	China	23–30	Japan	Higashiku Sports Center, Hiroshima; Referees: Al-Hagg, Samha (SYR)
23 July 2004; 18:40	Wu W.J. 8	(9–14)	Tanaka 8	Higashiku Sports Center, Hiroshima; Referees: Al-Hagg, Samha (SYR)
23 July 2004; 18:40	1× (yellow card) 4× (suspension)	Report	3× (yellow card) 6× (suspension)	Higashiku Sports Center, Hiroshima; Referees: Al-Hagg, Samha (SYR)

24 July 2004; 13:30	Japan	35–18	Chinese Taipei	Higashiku Sports Center, Hiroshima; Referees: Abulrethaei, Mohammad (KUW)
24 July 2004; 13:30	Nakamura, Yoshida 6	(17–7)	Chen Y.J., Shen F.N. 4	Higashiku Sports Center, Hiroshima; Referees: Abulrethaei, Mohammad (KUW)
24 July 2004; 13:30	3× (yellow card) 4× (suspension)	Report	2× (yellow card) 2× (suspension)	Higashiku Sports Center, Hiroshima; Referees: Abulrethaei, Mohammad (KUW)

24 July 2004; 15:30	South Korea	25–26	China	Higashiku Sports Center, Hiroshima; Referees: Al-Hagg, Samha (SYR)
24 July 2004; 15:30	Hu H.N. 11	(14–17)	Shen P. 8	Higashiku Sports Center, Hiroshima; Referees: Al-Hagg, Samha (SYR)
24 July 2004; 15:30	3× (yellow card) 3× (suspension)	Report	3× (yellow card) 4× (suspension) 1× (red card)	Higashiku Sports Center, Hiroshima; Referees: Al-Hagg, Samha (SYR)

25 July 2004; 13:30	China	42–28	Chinese Taipei	Higashiku Sports Center, Hiroshima; Referees: Hamada, Ogasawara (JPN)
25 July 2004; 13:30	Wang W. 11	(23–14)	Chen Y.J. 8	Higashiku Sports Center, Hiroshima; Referees: Hamada, Ogasawara (JPN)
25 July 2004; 13:30	3× (yellow card) 7× (suspension)	Report	3× (yellow card) 3× (suspension)	Higashiku Sports Center, Hiroshima; Referees: Hamada, Ogasawara (JPN)

25 July 2004; 15:30	Japan	31–23	South Korea	Higashiku Sports Center, Hiroshima; Referees: Abulrethaei, Mohammad (KUW)
25 July 2004; 15:30	Sakugawa 12	(15–13)	Song H.R. 8	Higashiku Sports Center, Hiroshima; Referees: Abulrethaei, Mohammad (KUW)
25 July 2004; 15:30	2× (yellow card) 4× (suspension)	Report	3× (yellow card) 4× (suspension)	Higashiku Sports Center, Hiroshima; Referees: Abulrethaei, Mohammad (KUW)

== Final standing ==
Rank	Team
1st place, gold medalist(s)	Japan
2nd place, silver medalist(s)	China
3rd place, bronze medalist(s)	South Korea
4	Chinese Taipei

Team qualified for the 2005 World Championship
