= 2010 Asian Women's Handball Championship =

2010 Asian Championship
Tournament details
- Host country: Kazakhstan
- Venue(s): 1 (in 1 host city)
- Dates: 19–25 December
- Teams: 8 (from 1 confederation)

Final positions
- Champions: Kazakhstan (2nd title)
- Runner-up: South Korea
- Third place: China
- Fourth place: Japan

Tournament statistics
- Matches played: 18
- Goals scored: 1,061 (58.94 per match)

The 2010 Asian Women's Handball Championship was the 13th Asian Championship, which took place from 19 to 25 December 2010 in Almaty, Kazakhstan. It acted as the Asian qualifying tournament for the 2011 World Women's Handball Championship in Brazil.

Due to heavy snow, both South Korea and Japan couldn't make the trip to Kazakhstan in time and the program was moved forward.

China, Japan, Kazakhstan and South Korea qualified for the World championship after reaching the semifinals.

== Draw ==
Group A	Group B
China; Kazakhstan; Iran; North Korea	South Korea; Japan; Thailand; Uzbekistan

== Preliminary round ==
All times are local (UTC+6).

=== Group A ===
Team	Pld	W	D	L	GF	GA	GD	Pts
Kazakhstan (H)	3	3	0	0	95	66	+29	6
China	3	2	0	1	101	69	+32	4
North Korea	3	1	0	2	105	90	+15	2
Iran	3	0	0	3	52	128	−76	0

(H) Hosts

19 December 2010; 18:30	China	22–25	Kazakhstan	Baluan Sholak Palace of Culture and Sports, Almaty
19 December 2010; 18:30		(14–13)		Baluan Sholak Palace of Culture and Sports, Almaty

20 December 2010; 14:00	Iran	22–47	North Korea	Baluan Sholak Palace of Culture and Sports, Almaty
20 December 2010; 14:00		(12–25)		Baluan Sholak Palace of Culture and Sports, Almaty

21 December 2010; 14:00	China	33–27	North Korea	Baluan Sholak Palace of Culture and Sports, Almaty
21 December 2010; 14:00		(14–12)		Baluan Sholak Palace of Culture and Sports, Almaty

21 December 2010; 17:00	Kazakhstan	35–13	Iran	Baluan Sholak Palace of Culture and Sports, Almaty
21 December 2010; 17:00		(23–7)		Baluan Sholak Palace of Culture and Sports, Almaty

22 December 2010; 14:00	China	46–17	Iran	Baluan Sholak Palace of Culture and Sports, Almaty
22 December 2010; 14:00		(20–7)		Baluan Sholak Palace of Culture and Sports, Almaty

22 December 2010; 17:00	Kazakhstan	35–31	North Korea	Baluan Sholak Palace of Culture and Sports, Almaty
22 December 2010; 17:00		(17–15)		Baluan Sholak Palace of Culture and Sports, Almaty

=== Group B ===
Team	Pld	W	D	L	GF	GA	GD	Pts
South Korea	3	2	1	0	120	49	+71	5
Japan	3	2	1	0	117	61	+56	5
Uzbekistan	3	1	0	2	69	142	−73	2
Thailand	3	0	0	3	53	107	−54	0

19 December 2010; 17:00	Thailand	25–31	Uzbekistan	Baluan Sholak Palace of Culture and Sports, Almaty
19 December 2010; 17:00		(11–17)		Baluan Sholak Palace of Culture and Sports, Almaty

20 December 2010; 15:30	Japan	57–22	Uzbekistan	Baluan Sholak Palace of Culture and Sports, Almaty
20 December 2010; 15:30		(31–11)		Baluan Sholak Palace of Culture and Sports, Almaty

20 December 2010; 17:00	South Korea	38–11	Thailand	Baluan Sholak Palace of Culture and Sports, Almaty
20 December 2010; 17:00		(21–5)		Baluan Sholak Palace of Culture and Sports, Almaty

21 December 2010; 15:30	South Korea	60–16	Uzbekistan	Baluan Sholak Palace of Culture and Sports, Almaty
21 December 2010; 15:30		(32–10)		Baluan Sholak Palace of Culture and Sports, Almaty

21 December 2010; 18:30	Japan	38–17	Thailand	Baluan Sholak Palace of Culture and Sports, Almaty
21 December 2010; 18:30		(18–9)		Baluan Sholak Palace of Culture and Sports, Almaty

22 December 2010; 15:30	South Korea	22–22	Japan	Baluan Sholak Palace of Culture and Sports, Almaty
22 December 2010; 15:30		(10–10)		Baluan Sholak Palace of Culture and Sports, Almaty

== Placement 5th–8th ==
=== 7th/8th ===
24 December 2010; 15:00	Iran	20–30	Thailand	Baluan Sholak Palace of Culture and Sports, Almaty
24 December 2010; 15:00		(7–11)		Baluan Sholak Palace of Culture and Sports, Almaty

=== 5th/6th ===
24 December 2010; 17:00	North Korea	52–21	Uzbekistan	Baluan Sholak Palace of Culture and Sports, Almaty
24 December 2010; 17:00		(24–7)		Baluan Sholak Palace of Culture and Sports, Almaty

== Final round ==
Semifinals
23 December – Almaty
Kazakhstan	29
Japan	24
23 December – Almaty
South Korea	31
China	26

Gold medal match
25 December – Almaty
Kazakhstan	33
South Korea	32
Bronze medal match
25 December – Almaty
Japan	25
China	26

=== Semifinals ===
23 December 2010; 15:00	Kazakhstan	29–24	Japan	Baluan Sholak Palace of Culture and Sports, Almaty
23 December 2010; 15:00		(16–13)		Baluan Sholak Palace of Culture and Sports, Almaty

23 December 2010; 17:00	South Korea	31–26	China	Baluan Sholak Palace of Culture and Sports, Almaty
23 December 2010; 17:00		(13–14)		Baluan Sholak Palace of Culture and Sports, Almaty

=== Bronze medal match ===
25 December 2010; 15:00	Japan	25–26	China	Baluan Sholak Palace of Culture and Sports, Almaty
25 December 2010; 15:00		(14–15)		Baluan Sholak Palace of Culture and Sports, Almaty

=== Gold medal match ===
25 December 2010; 17:00	Kazakhstan	33–32	South Korea	Baluan Sholak Palace of Culture and Sports, Almaty
25 December 2010; 17:00		(16–15)		Baluan Sholak Palace of Culture and Sports, Almaty

== Final standing ==
Rank	Team
1st place, gold medalist(s)	Kazakhstan
2nd place, silver medalist(s)	South Korea
3rd place, bronze medalist(s)	China
4	Japan
5	North Korea
6	Uzbekistan
7	Thailand
8	Iran

Team qualified for the 2011 World Championship
