= 2000 Asian Women's Handball Championship =

2000 Asian Championship
Tournament details
- Host country: China
- Venue: 1 (in 1 host city)
- Dates: 10–17 August
- Teams: 7 (from 1 confederation)

Final positions
- Champions: South Korea (8th title)
- Runners-up: Japan
- Third place: North Korea
- Fourth place: China

Tournament statistics
- Matches played: 14
- Goals scored: 697 (49.79 per match)

The 2000 Asian Women's Handball Championship, the eighth Asian Championship, which was taking place from 10 to 17 August 10 2000 in Shanghai, China. It acted as the Asian qualifying tournament for the 2001 World Women's Handball Championship.

== Teams ==
Group A	Group B
South Korea; Japan; Kazakhstan; Chinese Taipei	China; North Korea; India

== Preliminary round ==
All times are local (UTC+8).

=== Group A ===
Team	Pld	W	D	L	GF	GA	GD	Pts
South Korea	3	3	0	0	91	46	+45	6
Japan	3	2	0	1	71	63	+8	4
Kazakhstan	3	1	0	2	69	74	−5	2
Chinese Taipei	3	0	0	3	40	88	−48	0

10 August 2000; 14:00	South Korea	30–18	Kazakhstan	Shanghai
10 August 2000; 14:00		(18–6)		Shanghai

10 August 2000; 16:00	Japan	27–12	Chinese Taipei	Shanghai
10 August 2000; 16:00		(12–4)		Shanghai

11 August 2000; 14:00	South Korea	33–9	Chinese Taipei	Shanghai
11 August 2000; 14:00		(20–6)		Shanghai

11 August 2000; 16:00	Japan	25–23	Kazakhstan	Shanghai
11 August 2000; 16:00		(14–10)		Shanghai

13 August 2000; 14:00	Kazakhstan	30–16	Chinese Taipei	Shanghai
13 August 2000; 14:00		(12–6)		Shanghai

13 August 2000; 16:00	South Korea	28–19	Japan	Shanghai
13 August 2000; 16:00		(13–11)		Shanghai

=== Group B ===
Team	Pld	W	D	L	GF	GA	GD	Pts
China (H)	2	2	0	0	76	35	+41	4
North Korea	2	1	0	1	75	39	+36	2
India	2	0	0	2	22	99	−77	0

(H) Hosts

10 August 2000; 20:00	China	28–24	North Korea	Shanghai
10 August 2000; 20:00		(15–15)		Shanghai

11 August 2000; 18:00	North Korea	51–11	India	Shanghai
11 August 2000; 18:00		(27–7)		Shanghai

13 August 2000; 18:30	China	48–11	India	Shanghai
13 August 2000; 18:30		(24–5)		Shanghai

== Placement 5th/6th ==
16 August 2000; 16:00	Kazakhstan	48–10	India	Shanghai
16 August 2000; 16:00		(26–8)		Shanghai

== Final round ==
Semifinals
15 August – Shanghai
South Korea	29
North Korea	23
15 August – Shanghai
China	21
Japan	24

Gold medal match
17 August – Shanghai
South Korea	33
Japan	23
Bronze medal match
17 August – Shanghai
North Korea	24
China	18

=== Semifinals ===
15 August 2000; 16:00	South Korea	29–23	North Korea	Shanghai
15 August 2000; 16:00		(10–9)		Shanghai

15 August 2000; 18:00	China	21–24	Japan	Shanghai
15 August 2000; 18:00		(10–9)		Shanghai

=== Bronze medal match ===
17 August 2000; 16:00	North Korea	24–18	China	Shanghai
17 August 2000; 16:00		(10–9)		Shanghai

=== Gold medal match ===
17 August 2000; 18:00	South Korea	33–23	Japan	Shanghai
17 August 2000; 18:00		(14–9)		Shanghai

== Final standing ==
Rank	Team
1st place, gold medalist(s)	South Korea
2nd place, silver medalist(s)	Japan
3rd place, bronze medalist(s)	North Korea
4	China
5	Kazakhstan
6	India
7	Chinese Taipei

Team qualified for the 2001 World Championship
