= 2008 Asian Women's Handball Championship =

2008 Asian Championship

Tournament details
- Host country: Thailand
- Venue: 1 (in 1 host city)
- Dates: 21–30 November
- Teams: 10 (from 1 confederation)

Final positions
- Champions: South Korea (10th title)
- Runners-up: China
- Third place: Japan
- Fourth place: Thailand

Tournament statistics
- Matches played: 27
- Goals scored: 1,564 (57.93 per match)

The 2008 Asian Women's Handball Championship was the twelfth Asian Championship, which was taking place from 21 to 30 November 2008 in Bangkok, Thailand. It acted as the Asian qualifying tournament for the 2009 World Women's Handball Championship in China.

== Draw ==
Group A	Group B
Japan; South Korea; Kazakhstan; Uzbekistan; Iran	China; Thailand; India; Qatar; Vietnam

== Preliminary round ==
All times are local (UTC+7).

=== Group A ===
Team	Pld	W	D	L	GF	GA	GD	Pts
South Korea	4	4	0	0	176	97	+79	8
Japan	4	3	0	1	147	96	+51	6
Kazakhstan	4	2	0	2	135	93	+42	4
Iran	4	1	0	3	82	157	−75	2
Uzbekistan	4	0	0	4	78	175	−97	0

21 November 2008; 12:00	South Korea	57–26	Uzbekistan	Nimibutr Stadium, Bangkok
21 November 2008; 12:00		(31–10)		Nimibutr Stadium, Bangkok

21 November 2008; 13:30	Kazakhstan	41–18	Iran	Nimibutr Stadium, Bangkok
21 November 2008; 13:30		(21–5)		Nimibutr Stadium, Bangkok

22 November 2008; 13:30	Japan	47–14	Uzbekistan	Nimibutr Stadium, Bangkok
22 November 2008; 13:30		(21–3)		Nimibutr Stadium, Bangkok

22 November 2008; 18:00	South Korea	32–29	Kazakhstan	Nimibutr Stadium, Bangkok
22 November 2008; 18:00		(16–15)		Nimibutr Stadium, Bangkok

23 November 2008; 14:30	Japan	42–20	Iran	Nimibutr Stadium, Bangkok
23 November 2008; 14:30		(21–8)		Nimibutr Stadium, Bangkok

24 November 2008; 15:00	Kazakhstan	42–12	Uzbekistan	Nimibutr Stadium, Bangkok
24 November 2008; 15:00		(19–4)		Nimibutr Stadium, Bangkok

24 November 2008; 16:30	South Korea	48–15	Iran	Nimibutr Stadium, Bangkok
24 November 2008; 16:30		(22–7)		Nimibutr Stadium, Bangkok

25 November 2008; 14:30	Japan	31–23	Kazakhstan	Nimibutr Stadium, Bangkok
25 November 2008; 14:30		(15–9)		Nimibutr Stadium, Bangkok

26 November 2008; 13:30	Uzbekistan	26–29	Iran	Nimibutr Stadium, Bangkok
26 November 2008; 13:30		(12–17)		Nimibutr Stadium, Bangkok

26 November 2008; 15:00	South Korea	39–27	Japan	Nimibutr Stadium, Bangkok
26 November 2008; 15:00		(22–11)		Nimibutr Stadium, Bangkok

=== Group B ===
Team	Pld	W	D	L	GF	GA	GD	Pts
China	4	4	0	0	169	61	+108	8
Thailand (H)	4	3	0	1	121	110	+11	6
Vietnam	4	2	0	2	106	132	−26	4
India	4	1	0	3	108	136	−28	2
Qatar	4	0	0	4	82	147	−65	0

(H) Hosts

21 November 2008; 16:15	Thailand	34–23	Qatar	Nimibutr Stadium, Bangkok
21 November 2008; 16:15		(17–8)		Nimibutr Stadium, Bangkok

21 November 2008; 17:45	China	42–12	India	Nimibutr Stadium, Bangkok
21 November 2008; 17:45		(21–5)		Nimibutr Stadium, Bangkok

22 November 2008; 15:00	China	38–14	Qatar	Nimibutr Stadium, Bangkok
22 November 2008; 15:00		(19–5)		Nimibutr Stadium, Bangkok

22 November 2008; 16:30	India	27–29	Vietnam	Nimibutr Stadium, Bangkok
22 November 2008; 16:30		(15–13)		Nimibutr Stadium, Bangkok

23 November 2008; 16:00	Thailand	29–20	Vietnam	Nimibutr Stadium, Bangkok
23 November 2008; 16:00		(19–15)		Nimibutr Stadium, Bangkok

24 November 2008; 13:30	India	37–23	Qatar	Nimibutr Stadium, Bangkok
24 November 2008; 13:30		(18–13)		Nimibutr Stadium, Bangkok

24 November 2008; 18:00	China	54–19	Vietnam	Nimibutr Stadium, Bangkok
24 November 2008; 18:00		(26–10)		Nimibutr Stadium, Bangkok

25 November 2008; 16:00	Thailand	42–32	India	Nimibutr Stadium, Bangkok
25 November 2008; 16:00		(22–13)		Nimibutr Stadium, Bangkok

26 November 2008; 16:30	China	35–16	Thailand	Nimibutr Stadium, Bangkok
26 November 2008; 16:30		(19–11)		Nimibutr Stadium, Bangkok

26 November 2008; 18:00	Qatar	22–38	Vietnam	Nimibutr Stadium, Bangkok
26 November 2008; 18:00		(7–20)		Nimibutr Stadium, Bangkok

== Placement 5th–10th ==
=== 9th/10th ===
29 November 2008; 14:00	Uzbekistan	10–0	Qatar	Nimibutr Stadium, Bangkok
29 November 2008; 14:00		(Walkover)		Nimibutr Stadium, Bangkok

=== 7th/8th ===
29 November 2008; 16:00	Iran	34–30	India	Nimibutr Stadium, Bangkok
29 November 2008; 16:00		(17–12)		Nimibutr Stadium, Bangkok

=== 5th/6th ===
29 November 2008; 18:00	Kazakhstan	43–18	Vietnam	Nimibutr Stadium, Bangkok
29 November 2008; 18:00		(21–7)		Nimibutr Stadium, Bangkok

== Final round ==
Semifinals
28 November – Bangkok
South Korea	38
Thailand	17
28 November – Bangkok
China	29
Japan	28

Gold medal match
30 November – Bangkok
South Korea	35
China	23
Bronze medal match
30 November – Bangkok
Thailand	16
Japan	39

=== Semifinals ===
28 November 2008; 16:00	South Korea	38–17	Thailand	Nimibutr Stadium, Bangkok
28 November 2008; 16:00		(18–10)		Nimibutr Stadium, Bangkok

28 November 2008; 18:00	China	29–28	Japan	Nimibutr Stadium, Bangkok
28 November 2008; 18:00		(12–14)		Nimibutr Stadium, Bangkok

=== Bronze medal match ===
30 November 2008; 15:00	Thailand	16–39	Japan	Nimibutr Stadium, Bangkok
30 November 2008; 15:00		(11–20)		Nimibutr Stadium, Bangkok

=== Gold medal match ===
30 November 2008; 17:00	South Korea	35–23	China	Nimibutr Stadium, Bangkok
30 November 2008; 17:00		(16–14)		Nimibutr Stadium, Bangkok

== Final standing ==
Rank	Team
1st place, gold medalist(s)	South Korea
2nd place, silver medalist(s)	China
3rd place, bronze medalist(s)	Japan
4	Thailand
5	Kazakhstan
6	Vietnam
7	Iran
8	India
9	Uzbekistan
10	Qatar

Team qualified for the 2009 World Championship
