= 1989 Asian Women's Handball Championship =

1989 Asian Championship
Tournament details
- Host country: China
- Venue(s): 1 (in 1 host city)
- Dates: 21–29 August
- Teams: 5 (from 1 confederation)

Final positions
- Champions: South Korea (2nd title)
- Runners-up: China
- Third place: Japan
- Fourth place: Chinese Taipei

Tournament statistics
- Matches played: 10
- Goals scored: 510 (51 per match)

The 1989 Asian Women's Handball Championship was the second Asian Championship, which took place from 21 to 29 August 1989 in Beijing, China.

== Standings ==
| Team | Pld | W | D | L | GF | GA | GD | Pts |
|---|---|---|---|---|---|---|---|---|
| South Korea | 4 | 4 | 0 | 0 | 145 | 72 | +73 | 8 |
| China (H) | 4 | 3 | 0 | 1 | 125 | 73 | +52 | 6 |
| Japan | 4 | 2 | 0 | 2 | 122 | 79 | +43 | 4 |
| Chinese Taipei | 4 | 1 | 0 | 3 | 88 | 96 | −8 | 2 |
| Hong Kong | 4 | 0 | 0 | 4 | 30 | 190 | −160 | 0 |

(H) Hosts

== Results ==
| 23 August 1989 | South Korea | 32–14 | Chinese Taipei | Beijing |
| 23 August 1989 | | (13–8) | | Beijing |

| China | 25–21 | Japan | Beijing |

| South Korea | 51–8 | Hong Kong | Beijing |

| Chinese Taipei | 15–26 | Japan | Beijing |

| 26 August 1989 | Japan | 26–33 | South Korea | Beijing |

| Hong Kong | 7–47 | China | Beijing |

| Japan | 49–6 | Hong Kong | Beijing |

| Chinese Taipei | 16–29 | China | Beijing |

| 29 August 1989 | China | 24–29 | South Korea | Beijing |

| Hong Kong | 9–43 | Chinese Taipei | Beijing |

== Final standing ==
| Rank | Team |
|---|---|
| 1st place, gold medalist(s) | South Korea |
| 2nd place, silver medalist(s) | China |
| 3rd place, bronze medalist(s) | Japan |
| 4 | Chinese Taipei |
| 5 | Hong Kong |

| Team qualified for the 1990 World Championship |
