= North Korea women's national handball team =

North Korea

Information
- Association: Handball Association of the DPR Korea

Colours
1st	2nd

Results

Asian Championship
- Appearances: 6 (First in 1991)
- Best result: 3rd (1993, 2000)
- Last updated on Unknown.

The North Korea women's national handball team represents North Korea in international handball and is controlled by the Handball Association of the DPR Korea.

North Korea attended for the first time an international competition when they participated at the 2010 Asian Women's Handball Championship, where they finished fifth.

== Tournament history ==
=== Asian Championship ===
- 1991 – 4th
- 1993 – 3rd
- 1999 – 4th
- 2000 – 3rd
- 2010 – 5th
- 2012 – 5th
