= Japan women's national handball team =

Japan

Information
- Nickname: おりひめJAPAN
- Association: Japan Handball Association
- Coach: Morten Soubak
- Assistant coach: Shota Arai

Colours
1st	2nd

Results

Summer Olympics
- Appearances: 2 (First in 1976)
- Best result: 5th (1976)

World Championship
- Appearances: 22 (First in 1962)
- Best result: 7th (1965)

Asian Championship
- Appearances: 20 (First in 1987)
- Best result: Winner (2004, 2024)
- Last updated on November 2025.

The Japan women's national handball team is the national handball team of Japan and is controlled by the Japan Handball Association.

Together with South Korea they are one of the traditional powerhouses in Asia and have won the Asian Championship twice.

== Results ==
=== Summer Olympics ===
- 1976 – 5th
- 2020 – 12th

=== World Championship ===
- 1962 – 9th
- 1965 – 7th
- 1971 – 9th
- 1973 – 10th
- 1975 – 10th
- 1986 – 14th
- 1995 – 13–16th
- 1997 – 17th
- 1999 – 17th
- 2001 – 20th
- 2003 – 16th
- 2005 – 18th
- 2007 – 19th
- 2009 – 16th
- 2011 – 14th
- 2013 – 14th
- 2015 – 19th
- 2017 – 16th
- 2019 – 10th
- 2021 – 11th
- 2023 – 17th
- 2025 – 13th

=== Asian Championship ===
- 1987 – 3rd
- 1989 – 3rd
- 1991 – 2nd
- 1993 – 4th
- 1995 – 3rd
- 1997 – 3rd
- 1999 – 3rd
- 2000 – 2nd
- 2002 – 4th
- 2004 – 1st
- 2006 – 3rd
- 2008 – 3rd
- 2010 – 4th
- 2012 – 3rd
- 2015 – 2nd
- 2017 – 2nd
- 2018 – 2nd
- 2021 – 2nd
- 2022 – 2nd
- 2024 – 1st
- 2026 – Qualified

=== Other Competitions ===
==== Carpathian Trophy ====
- 2019 – 3rd

== Current squad ==
Squad for the 2025 World Women's Handball Championship.

Head coach: Morten Soubak

No.	Pos.	Name	Date of birth (age)	Height	App.	Goals	Club
3	P	Miyako Hatsumi	10 September 1997 (age 29)	1.65 m	36	64	(Japan) Mie Violet Iris
5	RB	Arisa Kinjo	8 December 1999 (age 26)	1.60 m	10	28	(South Korea) Wonderful Samcheok
12	GK	Kanako Shimoya	15 October 1998 (age 28)	1.68 m	1	0	(Japan) Kumamoto Beaust Pindys
13	RB	Kaho Nakayama	23 October 1998 (age 28)	1.73 m	43	135	(Germany) BSV Sachsen Zwickau
17	LB	Ayaka Ohmatsuzawa	7 August 1997 (age 29)	1.73 m	14	8	(Japan) Prestige International Aranmare
19	P	Naoko Sahara	18 January 1996 (age 30)	1.80 m	31	44	(Japan) Hokkoku Bank Handball Team
20	RW	Natsumi Akiyama	23 July 1994 (age 32)	1.62 m	47	107	(Japan) Prestige International Aranmare
23	CB	Natsuki Aizawa	6 January 1999 (age 27)	1.61 m	41	183	(Germany) Thüringer HC
24	CB	Ayama Okada	24 May 2000 (age 26)	1.68 m	30	76	(Japan) Kagawa Bank
29	LW	Senri Ryu	12 July 1999 (age 27)	1.69 m	4	1	(Japan) Sony Semiconductor
30	GK	Sakura Hauge	7 January 1987 (age 39)	1.74 m	79	8	(Norway) Molde Elite
32	LB	Haruno Sasaki	26 February 1995 (age 31)	1.72 m	63	172	(Germany) Frisch Auf Göppingen
37	LB	Minami Matsuura	26 January 2002 (age 24)	1.58 m	1	0	(Japan) Kagawa Bank
51	LW	Yuki Yoshidome	2 August 1998 (age 28)	1.64 m	38	83	(Japan) Hokkoku Bank Handball Team
55	P	Clare Francis Gray	3 June 1997 (age 29)	1.71 m	9	18	(Japan) Kumamoto Beaust Pindys
62	LB	Mei Kawashima	28 September 2001 (age 25)	1.70 m	0	0	(Japan) Sony Semiconductor
77	GK	Aki Ueshima	5 July 2001 (age 25)	1.76 m	0	0	(France) ASUL Vaulx-en-Velin
89	RB	Sora Ishikawa	20 December 2002 (age 23)	1.70 m	31	71	(Norway) Molde Elite

== List of head coaches ==
- 1998 - 2001 (Japan) Hiroyuki Ito
- 2002 - 2004 (Japan) Katsuhiro Nishikubo
- 2005 - 2008 (Netherlands) Bert Bouwer
- 2008 - 2012 (South Korea) Hwang Kyun-young
- 2012 - 2017 (Japan) Masamichi Kuriyama
- 2017 - 2021 (Denmark) Ulrik Kirkely
- 2021 - 2024 (Japan) Shigeo Kusumoto
- 2024 - 2024 (Japan) Toshiyuki Tanaka
- 2024 - 2025 (Japan) Shota Arai
- 2025 - (Denmark) Morten Soubak
