= 1993 Asian Women's Handball Championship =

1993 Asian Championship
Tournament details
- Host country: China
- Venue(s): 1 (in 1 host city)
- Dates: 18–24 August
- Teams: 7 (from 1 confederation)

Final positions
- Champions: South Korea (4th title)
- Runner-up: China
- Third place: North Korea
- Fourth place: Japan

Tournament statistics
- Matches played: 14
- Goals scored: 732 (52.29 per match)

The 1993 Asian Women's Handball Championship, the fourth Asian Championship, which was taking place from 18 to 24 August 1993 in Shantou, China.

== Preliminary round ==
=== Group A ===
Team	Pld	W	D	L	GF	GA	GD	Pts
South Korea	2	2	0	0	74	43	+31	4
North Korea	2	1	0	1	56	52	+4	2
Chinese Taipei	2	0	0	2	36	71	−35	0

South Korea	36–23	North Korea	Shantou

Chinese Taipei	20–38	South Korea	Shantou

North Korea	33–16	Chinese Taipei	Shantou

=== Group B ===
Team	Pld	W	D	L	GF	GA	GD	Pts
China (H)	3	3	0	0	94	57	+37	6
Japan	3	2	0	1	86	56	+30	4
Kazakhstan	3	1	0	2	94	64	+30	2
India	3	0	0	3	29	126	−97	0

(H) Hosts

China	24–21	Japan	Shantou

Kazakhstan	46–9	India	Shantou

China	30–26	Kazakhstan	Shantou

Japan	40–10	India	Shantou

Kazakhstan	22–25	Japan	Shantou

India	10–40	China	Shantou

== Placement 5th/6th ==
Chinese Taipei	16–34	Kazakhstan	Shantou

== Final round ==
Semifinals
South Korea	41
Japan	27
China	21
North Korea	9

Gold medal match
South Korea	43
China	26
Bronze medal match
Japan	21
North Korea	25

=== Semifinals ===
South Korea	41–27	Japan	Shantou

China	21–9	North Korea	Shantou

=== Bronze medal match ===
Japan	21–25	North Korea	Shantou

=== Gold medal match ===
24 August 1993	South Korea	43–26	China	Shantou

== Final standing ==
Rank	Team
1st place, gold medalist(s)	South Korea
2nd place, silver medalist(s)	China
3rd place, bronze medalist(s)	North Korea
4	Japan
5	Kazakhstan
6	Chinese Taipei
7	India

Team qualified for the 1993 World Championship

NB : China was probably already qualified thanks to its 8th place at the 1990 World Championship.
