= 2006 Asian Women's Handball Championship =

2006 Asian Championship
Tournament details
- Host country: China
- Venue: 1 (in 1 host city)
- Dates: 1–5 July
- Teams: 4 (from 1 confederation)

Final positions
- Champions: South Korea (9th title)
- Runners-up: China
- Third place: Japan
- Fourth place: Kazakhstan

Tournament statistics
- Matches played: 6
- Goals scored: 333 (55.5 per match)

The 2006 Asian Women's Handball Championship, the eleventh Asian Championship, which was taking place from 1 to 5 July 2006 in Guangzhou, China. It acted as the Asian qualifying tournament for the 2007 World Women's Handball Championship.

== Standings ==
Team	Pld	W	D	L	GF	GA	GD	Pts
South Korea	3	3	0	0	97	65	+32	6
China (H)	3	2	0	1	89	72	+17	4
Japan	3	1	0	2	91	82	+9	2
Kazakhstan	3	0	0	3	56	114	−58	0

(H) Hosts

== Results ==
All times are local (UTC+8).

1 July 2006; 19:00	South Korea	39–16	Kazakhstan	Tianhe Gymnasium, Guangzhou
1 July 2006; 19:00		(16–7)		Tianhe Gymnasium, Guangzhou

1 July 2006; 21:00	Japan	27–29	China	Tianhe Gymnasium, Guangzhou
1 July 2006; 21:00		(15–18)		Tianhe Gymnasium, Guangzhou

3 July 2006; 19:00	Japan	23–31	South Korea	Tianhe Gymnasium, Guangzhou
3 July 2006; 19:00		(13–19)		Tianhe Gymnasium, Guangzhou

3 July 2006; 21:00	China	34–18	Kazakhstan	Tianhe Gymnasium, Guangzhou
3 July 2006; 21:00		(17–10)		Tianhe Gymnasium, Guangzhou

5 July 2006; 17:00	Japan	41–22	Kazakhstan	Tianhe Gymnasium, Guangzhou
5 July 2006; 17:00		(20–12)		Tianhe Gymnasium, Guangzhou

5 July 2006; 19:00	China	26–27	South Korea	Tianhe Gymnasium, Guangzhou
5 July 2006; 19:00		(12–14)		Tianhe Gymnasium, Guangzhou

== Final standing ==
Rank	Team
1st place, gold medalist(s)	South Korea
2nd place, silver medalist(s)	China
3rd place, bronze medalist(s)	Japan
4	Kazakhstan

Team qualified for the 2007 World Championship
