= 1997 Asian Women's Handball Championship =

1997 Asian Championship
Tournament details
- Host country: Jordan
- Venue: 1 (in 1 host city)
- Dates: 4–9 June
- Teams: 5 (from 1 confederation)

Final positions
- Champions: South Korea (6th title)
- Runners-up: China
- Third place: Japan
- Fourth place: Uzbekistan

Tournament statistics
- Matches played: 10
- Goals scored: 479 (47.9 per match)

The 1997 Asian Women's Handball Championship was the sixth Asian Championship, which took place from 4 to 9 June 1997 in Amman, Jordan. It acts as the Asian qualifying tournament for the 1997 World Women's Handball Championship.

== Standings ==
Team	Pld	W	D	L	GF	GA	GD	Pts
South Korea	4	4	0	0	156	71	+85	8
China	4	3	0	1	115	89	+26	6
Japan	4	2	0	2	88	91	−3	4
Uzbekistan	4	1	0	3	74	105	−31	2
Chinese Taipei	4	0	0	4	46	123	−77	0

== Results ==
4 June 1997	China	27–22	Japan	Amman
4 June 1997		(11–13)		Amman

4 June 1997	South Korea	41–16	Uzbekistan	Amman

5 June 1997	Chinese Taipei	12–25	Japan	Amman
5 June 1997		(7–12)		Amman

5 June 1997	China	29–21	Uzbekistan	Amman

6 June 1997	Uzbekistan	21–12	Chinese Taipei	Amman

6 June 1997	South Korea	34–27	China	Amman

7 June 1997	South Korea	45–10	Chinese Taipei	Amman

7 June 1997	Japan	23–16	Uzbekistan	Amman
7 June 1997		(8–10)		Amman

8 June 1997	China	32–12	Chinese Taipei	Amman

8 June 1997	South Korea	36–18	Japan	Amman
8 June 1997		(15–7)		Amman

== Final standing ==
Rank	Team
1st place, gold medalist(s)	South Korea
2nd place, silver medalist(s)	China
3rd place, bronze medalist(s)	Japan
4	Uzbekistan
5	Chinese Taipei

Team qualified for the 1997 World Championship
