= 1995 Asian Women's Handball Championship =

1995 Asian Championship
Tournament details
- Host country: South Korea
- Venue: 1 (in 1 host city)
- Dates: 6–8 May
- Teams: 4 (from 1 confederation)

Final positions
- Champions: South Korea (5th title)
- Runners-up: China
- Third place: Japan
- Fourth place: Chinese Taipei

Tournament statistics
- Matches played: 6
- Goals scored: 273 (45.5 per match)

The 1995 Asian Women's Handball Championship, the fifth Asian Championship, which was taking place from 6 to 8 May 1995 in Seoul, South Korea. It acts as the Asian qualifying tournament for the 1995 World Women's Handball Championship.

== Standings ==
Team	Pld	W	D	L	GF	GA	GD	Pts
South Korea (H)	3	3	0	0	99	50	+49	6
China	3	2	0	1	76	71	+5	4
Japan	3	1	0	2	57	65	−8	2
Chinese Taipei	3	0	0	3	41	87	−46	0

(H) Hosts

== Results ==
South Korea	34–24	China	Seoul

Japan	24–11	Chinese Taipei	Seoul

South Korea	31–15	Japan	Seoul

China	29–19	Chinese Taipei	Seoul

Japan	18–23	China	Seoul

Chinese Taipei	11–34	South Korea	Seoul

== Final standing ==
Rank	Team
1st place, gold medalist(s)	South Korea
2nd place, silver medalist(s)	China
3rd place, bronze medalist(s)	Japan
4	Chinese Taipei

Team qualified for the 1996 Summer Olympics and 1995 World Championship
Team qualified for the 1995 World Championship
