= South Korea women's national handball team =

South Korea

Information
- Association: Korea Handball Federation
- Coach: Lee Kye-chung
- Assistant coach: Chong Yeon-ho
- Captain: Shin Eun-joo
- Most caps: Ryu Eun-hee (171)

Colours
1st	2nd

Results

Summer Olympics
- Appearances: 11 (First in 1984)
- Best result: Gold medal (1988, 1992)

World Championship
- Appearances: 21 (First in 1978)
- Best result: Champions (1995)

Asian Championship
- Appearances: 20 (First in 1987)
- Best result: (gold) Champions (1987, 1989, 1991, 1993, 1995, 1997, 1999, 2000, 2006, 2008, 2012, 2015, 2017, 2018, 2021, 2022)
- Last updated on Unknown.

South Korea women's national handball team
Medal record

Olympic Games
Gold medal – first place	1988 Seoul	Team
Gold medal – first place	1992 Barcelona	Team
Silver medal – second place	1984 Los Angeles	Team
Silver medal – second place	1996 Atlanta	Team
Silver medal – second place	2004 Athens	Team
Bronze medal – third place	2008 Beijing	Team

World Championship
Gold medal – first place	1995 Austria/Hungary	
Bronze medal – third place	2003 Croatia	

Asian Games
Gold medal – first place	1990 Beijing	Team
Gold medal – first place	1994 Hiroshima	Team
Gold medal – first place	1998 Bangkok	Team
Gold medal – first place	2002 Busan	Team
Gold medal – first place	2006 Doha	Team
Gold medal – first place	2014 Incheon	Team
Gold medal – first place	2018 Jakarta-Palembang	Team
Gold medal – first place	2026 Aichi-Nagoya	Team
Silver medal – second place	2022 Hangzhou	Team
Bronze medal – third place	2010 Guangzhou	Team

Asian Championship
Gold medal – first place	1987 Amman	
Gold medal – first place	1989 Beijing	
Gold medal – first place	1991 Hiroshima	
Gold medal – first place	1993 Shantou	
Gold medal – first place	1995 Seoul	
Gold medal – first place	1997 Amman	
Gold medal – first place	1999 Kumamoto	
Gold medal – first place	2000 Shanghai	
Gold medal – first place	2006 Guangzhou	
Gold medal – first place	2008 Bangkok	
Gold medal – first place	2012 Yogyakarta	
Gold medal – first place	2015 Jakarta	
Gold medal – first place	2017 Suwon	
Gold medal – first place	2018 Kumamoto	
Gold medal – first place	2021 Amman	
Gold medal – first place	2022 Incheon/Seoul	
Silver medal – second place	2002 Almaty	
Silver medal – second place	2010 Almaty	
Silver medal – second place	2024 New Delhi	
Bronze medal – third place	2004 Hiroshima	

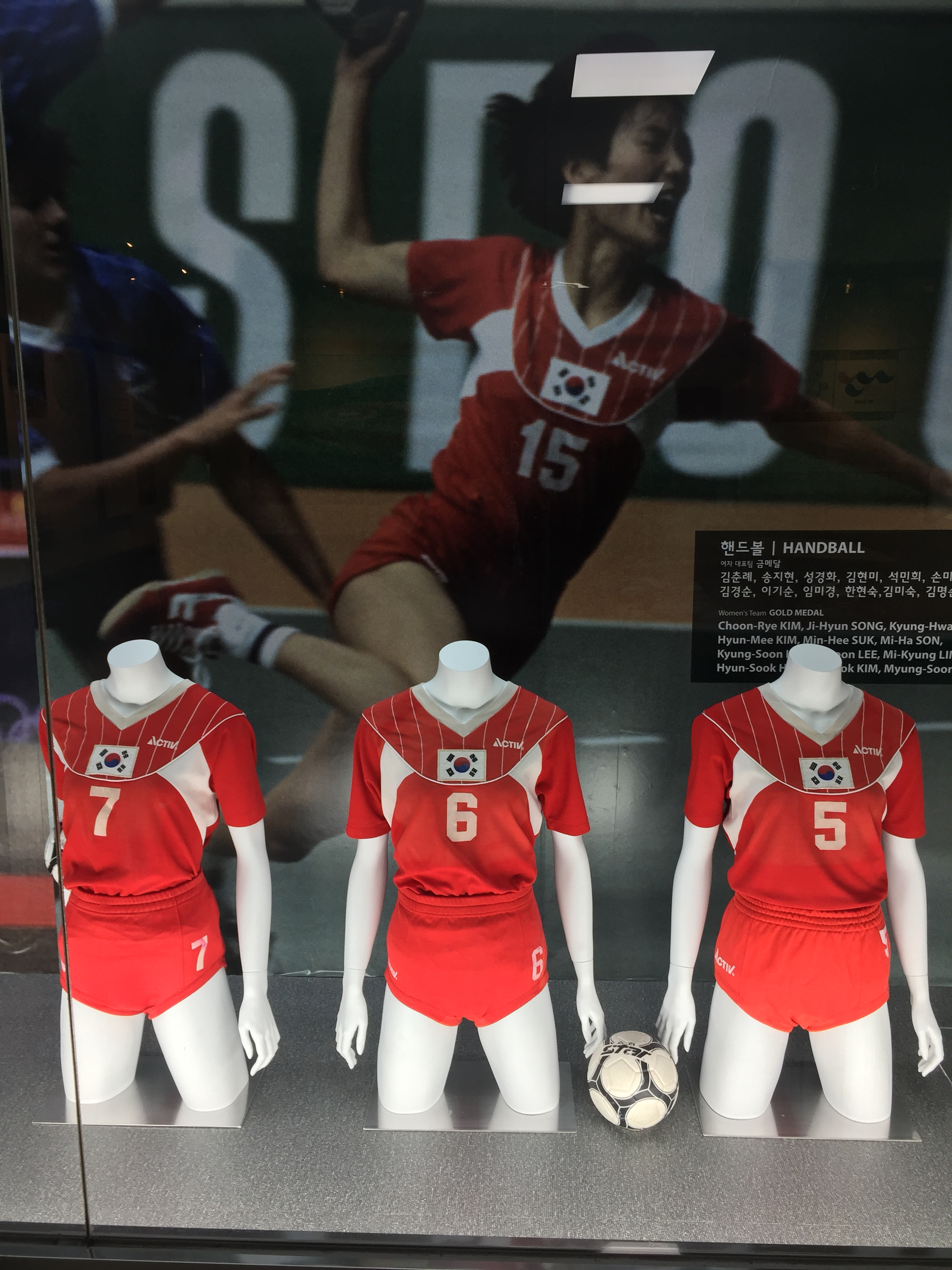
Korean handball players' uniforms at the 1988 Olympics

The South Korea women's national handball team is the national team of South Korea. Since 1984, the Korean team has not only participated constantly in Olympic Games but also ranked among the top four nations every time until 2012. Korea grabbed the gold medal in 1988 and 1992, won the silver medal in 1984, 1996, 2004 and took bronze medal in 2008. They have earned two World Championship medals so far: In 1995, they also won the World Championship title in Austria/Hungary 1995 World Women's Handball Championship, they came off third to secure the bronze medal at the Croatia in 2003 World Women's Handball Championship. It is a twelve-time Asian Champion, the tournament has been won by any other nation only twice.

Both the men's and women's and children's teams failed to qualify in the regional qualifiers for the 2008 Beijing Olympics in 2007 August due to the biased refereeing, but the International Handball Federation ordered replays of both qualifying tournaments after acknowledging biased officiating by Middle Eastern referees. South Korea beat Japan in both the men's and women's matches and qualified for the Beijing Olympic Games in 2008 January. However, the Executive Committee of the Kuwait-based federation, which had rejected the International Handball Federation's ruling to hold the replays, agreed to fine Japan and South Korea $1,000 and issued a warning to both countries. In addition, the Asian Handball Federation appealed the IHF's decision to the Court of Arbitration for Sport, which ruled the Asian women's qualification invalid and forced the Korean ladies to play in the final Olympic qualifying tournament. The replay was decided to be invalid by the Court. The Korean women's team earned their ticket to the Beijing Olympics at the Olympic qualifying game held at Nîmes, France.
In the semi-final match of 2008 Beijing Olympic games with Norway, Norway's deciding goal was requested to be annulled by the Korean delegation, because they claimed the ball had not crossed the goal line before the end whistle of the game. Korea's appeal was turned down by the IHF's Disciplinary Commission, confirming the end result to be 29–28 in favor of Norway.

The 2008 film Forever the Moment is a fictionalized account of the teams' journey to the 2004 Athens Olympics.

== Results ==
=== Olympic Games ===
Year	Position	Tournament	Host
1984	2	(United States) Los Angeles Olympics	United States
1988	1	(South Korea) Seoul Olympics	South Korea
1992	1	(Spain) Barcelona Olympics	Spain
1996	2	(United States) Atlanta Olympics	United States
2000	4	(Australia) Sydney Olympics	Australia
2004	2	(Greece) Athens Olympics	Greece
2008	3	(China) Beijing Olympics	China
2012	4	(United Kingdom) London Olympics	Great Britain
2016	10	(Brazil) Rio Olympics	Brazil
2020	8	(Japan) Tokyo Olympics	Japan
2024	10	(France) Paris Olympics	France

=== World Championship ===
- 1978 – 10–12th place
- 1982 – 6th place
- 1986 – 11th place
- 1990 – 11th place
- 1993 – 11th place
- 1995 – Champions
- 1997 – 5th place
- 1999 – 9th place
- 2001 – 15th place
- 2003 – 3rd place
- 2005 – 8th place
- 2007 – 6th place
- 2009 – 6th place
- 2011 – 11th place
- 2013 – 12th place
- 2015 – 14th place
- 2017 – 13th place
- 2019 – 11th place
- 2021 – 14th place
- 2023 – 22nd place
- 2025 – 23rd place

=== Asian Games ===
- 1990 – (gold) Champions
- 1994 – (gold) Champions
- 1998 – (gold) Champions
- 2002 – (gold) Champions
- 2006 – (gold) Champions
- 2010 – (bronze) 3rd place
- 2014 – (gold) Champions
- 2018 – (gold) Champions
- 2022 – (silver) Runners-up
- 2026 – (gold) Champions

=== Asian Championship ===
- 1987 – (gold) Champions
- 1989 – (gold) Champions
- 1991 – (gold) Champions
- 1993 – (gold) Champions
- 1995 – (gold) Champions
- 1997 – (gold) Champions
- 1999 – (gold) Champions
- 2000 – (gold) Champions
- 2002 – (silver) Runners-up
- 2004 – (bronze) 3rd place
- 2006 – (gold) Champions
- 2008 – (gold) Champions
- 2010 – (silver) Runners-up
- 2012 – (gold) Champions
- 2015 – (gold) Champions
- 2017 – (gold) Champions
- 2018 – (gold) Champions
- 2021 – (gold) Champions
- 2022 – (gold) Champions
- 2024 – (silver) Runners-up
- 2026 – Qualified

=== Other tournaments ===
- Carpathian Trophy 1994 – 2nd place
- Carpathian Trophy 2006 – 2nd place
- Møbelringen Cup 2017 – 4th place

== Team ==
=== Current squad ===
Roster for the 2025 World Women's Handball Championship.

Head coach: Lee Kye-chung

No.	Pos.	Name	Date of birth (age)	Height	App.	Goals	Club
7	LW	Lee Won-jung	17 May 2002 (age 24)	1.71 m	6	16	(South Korea) Powerful Daegu
9	CB	Lee Yeon-gyeong	2 October 1991 (age 35)	1.65 m	0	0	(South Korea) Gyeongnam Development Corporation
10	P	Song Hae-ri	2 October 1997 (age 29)	1.73 m	0	0	(South Korea) Busan Bisco
11	CB	Kim Yeon-woo	13 October 2003 (age 23)	1.65 m	6	4	(South Korea) Gyeongnam Development Corporation
12	GK	Jeong Jin-hui	24 March 1999 (age 27)	1.80 m	28	0	(South Korea) Seoul City Hall
16	GK	Park Sae-young	11 August 1994 (age 32)	1.76 m	26	0	(South Korea) Wonderful Samcheok
18	P	Yeon Ji-hyun	5 March 2002 (age 24)	1.75 m	7	6	(South Korea) Gwangju City Corporation
19	LB	Kim Da-young	16 September 1996 (age 30)	1.70 m	5	5	(South Korea) Busan Bisco
23	LB	Song Ji-eun	4 September 1996 (age 30)	1.70 m	0	0	(South Korea) Sk Sugar Gliders
24	LB	Hur You-jin	24 January 1996 (age 30)	1.70 m	0	0	(South Korea) Wonderful Samcheok
26	LB	Woo Bit-na	23 October 2001 (age 25)	1.72 m	19	69	(South Korea) Seoul City Hall
27	RW	Jeon Ji-yeon	2 May 2003 (age 23)	1.68 m	17	25	(South Korea) Wonderful Samcheok
29	LW	Yun Ye-jin	3 November 2000 (age 26)	1.63 m	13	16	(South Korea) Seoul City Hall
31	P	Gim Bo-eun	8 December 1997 (age 28)	1.77 m	18	28	(South Korea) Wonderful Samcheok
33	RB	Jung Ji-in	18 July 2000 (age 26)	1.80 m	14	17	(South Korea) Powerful Daegu
35	RB	Lee Hye-won	16 May 2004 (age 22)	1.68 m	22	78	(South Korea) Busan Bisco
36	RW	Cha Seo-yeon	24 July 2004 (age 22)	1.62 m	15	64	(South Korea) Incheon Metropolitan City
37	CB	Kim Min-seo	14 February 2004 (age 22)	1.60 m	8	58	(South Korea) Wonderful Samcheok

=== Notable players ===
- Lim O-kyeong – World Handball Player of the Year (1996)
- Kim Hyun-mee – World Handball Player of the Year (1989)

=== Notable coaches ===
- Kang Jae-won
- Chung Hyung-kyun

== See also ==
- South Korea men's national handball team
