= Asian Women's Handball Championship =

Biennial continental handball competition

- Current season, competition or edition: 2024 Asian Women's Handball Championship
- Sport: Handball
- Founded: 1987
- First season: 1987
- Continent: Asia (AHF)
- Most recent champion: Japan (2nd title)
- Most titles: South Korea (16 titles)

The AHF Asian Women's Handball Championship is a biennial continental handball competition contested by the senior women's national teams of the members of Asian Handball Federation (AHF). Since 2018, it also includes teams from Oceania. The competition also serves as a qualifying tournament for the IHF World Women's Handball Championship.

The current champion is Japan, which won its 2nd title at the 2024 tournament.

== Summary ==
Year	Host	Final			Third place match		
Year	Host	Champion	Score	Runner-up	Third place	Score	Fourth place
1987; Details	(Jordan); Amman	South Korea	34–24	China	Japan	26–9	Syria
1989; Details	(China); Beijing	South Korea	No playoffs	China	Japan	No playoffs	Chinese Taipei
1991; Details	(Japan); Hiroshima	South Korea	No playoffs	Japan	China	No playoffs	North Korea
1993; Details	(China); Shantou	South Korea	43–26	China	North Korea	25–21	Japan
1995; Details	(South Korea); Seoul	South Korea	No playoffs	China	Japan	No playoffs	Chinese Taipei
1997; Details	(Jordan); Amman	South Korea	No playoffs	China	Japan	No playoffs	Uzbekistan
1999^{1} Details	(Japan); Kumamoto	South Korea	No playoffs	China	Japan	No playoffs	North Korea
2000; Details	(China); Shanghai	South Korea	33–23	Japan	North Korea	24–18	China
2002; Details	(Kazakhstan); Almaty	Kazakhstan	27–25	South Korea	China	29–23	Japan
2004; Details	(Japan); Hiroshima	Japan	No playoffs	China	South Korea	No playoffs	Chinese Taipei
2006; Details	(China); Guangzhou	South Korea	No playoffs	China	Japan	No playoffs	Kazakhstan
2008; Details	(Thailand); Bangkok	South Korea	35–23	China	Japan	39–16	Thailand
2010; Details	(Kazakhstan); Almaty	Kazakhstan	33–32	South Korea	China	26–25	Japan
2012; Details	(Indonesia); Yogyakarta	South Korea	40–22	China	Japan	21–20	Kazakhstan
2015; Details	(Indonesia); Jakarta	South Korea	36–22	Japan	China	28–25	Kazakhstan
2017; Details	(South Korea); Suwon	South Korea	30–20	Japan	China	34–26	Kazakhstan
2018; Details	(Japan); Kumamoto	South Korea	30–25	Japan	China	27–21	Kazakhstan
2021; Details	(Jordan); Amman	South Korea	33–24	Japan	Kazakhstan	38–33	Iran
2022; Details	(South Korea); Incheon/Seoul	South Korea	34–29 (OT)	Japan	China	39–24	Iran
2024; Details	(India); New Delhi	Japan	25–24	South Korea	Kazakhstan	28–22	Iran
2026; Details	(Kazakhstan); Almaty						

== Medal table ==
Rank	Nation	Gold	Silver	Bronze	Total
1	South Korea	16	3	1	20
2	Japan	2	7	8	17
3	Kazakhstan	2	0	2	4
4	China	0	10	7	17
5	North Korea	0	0	2	2
Totals (5 entries)		20	20	20	60

== Participating nations ==
Nation	(Jordan) 1987	(China) 1989	(Japan) 1991	(China) 1993	(South Korea) 1995	(Jordan) 1997	(Japan) 1999	(China) 2000	(Kazakhstan) 2002	(Japan) 2004	(China) 2006	(Thailand) 2008	(Kazakhstan) 2010	(Indonesia) 2012	(Indonesia) 2015	(South Korea) 2017	(Japan) 2018	(Jordan) 2021	(South Korea) 2022	(India) 2024	(Kazakhstan) 2026	Years
Australia																	5th		10th		Q	3
Bangladesh																					WD	1
China	2nd	2nd	3rd	2nd	2nd	2nd	2nd	4th	3rd	2nd	2nd	2nd	3rd	2nd	3rd	3rd	3rd		3rd	5th	Q	20
Chinese Taipei	5th	4th	5th	6th	4th	5th	5th	7th	5th	4th				7th								11
Hong Kong		5th													8th	8th	7th	6th	9th	7th	Q	8
India				7th				6th				8th		8th	7th		8th		6th	6th	Q	9
Indonesia														11th	9th							2
Iran												7th	8th	9th	6th	7th	6th	4th	4th	4th	Q	10
Japan	3rd	3rd	2nd	4th	3rd	3rd	3rd	2nd	4th	1st	3rd	3rd	4th	3rd	2nd	2nd	2nd	2nd	2nd	1st	Q	21
Jordan	6th																	7th				2
Kazakhstan				5th				5th	1st		4th	5th	1st	4th	4th	4th	4th	3rd	5th	3rd	Q	14
Kuwait														12th				10th				2
New Zealand																	10th					1
North Korea			4th	3rd			4th	3rd					5th	5th								6
Palestine																		11th				1
Qatar												10th										1
Singapore																	9th	9th		8th		3
South Korea	1st	1st	1st	1st	1st	1st	1st	1st	2nd	3rd	1st	1st	2nd	1st	1st	1st	1st	1st	1st	2nd	Q	21
Syria	4th																	8th				2
Thailand												4th	7th						7th		Q	4
Turkmenistan									6th					10th								2
Uzbekistan						4th			7th			9th	6th	6th	5th	5th		5th	8th		Q	10
Vietnam												6th				6th						2
Total	6	5	5	7	4	5	5	7	7	4	4	10	8	12	9	8	10	11	10	8	11	

== See also ==
- Asian Women's Junior Handball Championship
- Asian Women's Youth Handball Championship
- Asian Men's Handball Championship
- Asian Men's Junior Handball Championship
- Asian Men's Youth Handball Championship

== Notes ==
1. Played in January 2000.
