= 2023 West Asian Women's Handball Championship =

2025 edition of the Women's Handball World Championship

2023 AHF Women's President Cup
بطولة غرب آسيا الثالثة للسيدات لكرة اليد

Tournament details
- Host country: Jordan
- Venue: 1 (in 1 host city)
- Dates: 7–14 February
- Teams: 4 (from 1 confederation)

Final positions
- Champions: India (1st title)
- Runners-up: Jordan
- Third place: Iraq
- Fourth place: Kuwait

Tournament statistics
- Matches played: 12
- Goals scored: 621 (51.75 per match)
- Top scorers: (Iraq) Mast Hama Saleh (48 goals)

Awards
- Best player: (India) Nidhi Sharma

The 2023 AHF Women's President Cup was the third edition of the AHF Women's President Cup (previously known as the West Asian Women's Handball Championship), the international handball championship organised under the aegis of Asian Handball Federation (AHF) for the women's national teams of Western Asia. The tournament was held in Amman, Jordan from 7 to 14 February 2023.

Iran were the defending champions. India went on undefeated to clinch the title.

== Pariticpating teams ==
5 nations were initially set to participate in the tournament; however, Uzbekistan withdrew after the draw.

Team	App.	Previous best performance
India	1st	Debut
Iraq	3rd	Third place (2016)
Jordan	3rd	Runners-up (2016, 2017)
Kuwait	1st	Debut

== Standings ==
Pos	Team	Pld	W	D	L	GF	GA	GD	Pts
1	India	6	6	0	0	221	105	+116	12
2	Jordan	6	4	0	2	164	133	+31	8
3	Iraq	6	2	0	4	134	178	−44	4
4	Kuwait	6	0	0	6	102	205	−103	0

Source: AHF
Rules for classification: 1) points; 2) head-to-head points; 3) head-to-head goal difference; 4) head-to-head number of goals scored; 5) goal difference.

== Results ==
7 February 2023; 16:00	Kuwait	15–41	India	Princess Sumaya Hall, Amman; Referees: Hamdan, Al Ramadena (JOR)
7 February 2023; 16:00	Sl. Salem, Al-Salboukh 4	(5–21)	Bhawna 9	Princess Sumaya Hall, Amman; Referees: Hamdan, Al Ramadena (JOR)
7 February 2023; 16:00	10× (suspension)	Report	4× (suspension)	Princess Sumaya Hall, Amman; Referees: Hamdan, Al Ramadena (JOR)

7 February 2023; 18:00	Iraq	17–31	Jordan	Princess Sumaya Hall, Amman; Referees: Razakbergenova, Allayarova (UZB)
7 February 2023; 18:00	Mohammed, Hussein 5	(7–18)	S. Obeidat 7	Princess Sumaya Hall, Amman; Referees: Razakbergenova, Allayarova (UZB)
7 February 2023; 18:00	1× (yellow card) 4× (suspension)	Report	2× (suspension)	Princess Sumaya Hall, Amman; Referees: Razakbergenova, Allayarova (UZB)

8 February 2023; 16:00	Iraq	13–40	India	Princess Sumaya Hall, Amman; Referees: Al Ramadena, Hamdan (JOR)
8 February 2023; 16:00	Hama Saleh 6	(4–21)	Mitali 10	Princess Sumaya Hall, Amman; Referees: Al Ramadena, Hamdan (JOR)
8 February 2023; 16:00	3× (suspension)	Report	1× (suspension)	Princess Sumaya Hall, Amman; Referees: Al Ramadena, Hamdan (JOR)

8 February 2023; 18:00	Kuwait	16–35	Jordan	Princess Sumaya Hall, Amman; Referees: Al-Dughaishi, Al Hasani (OMA)
8 February 2023; 18:00	Al-Saad 8	(7–16)	S. Obeidat 7	Princess Sumaya Hall, Amman; Referees: Al-Dughaishi, Al Hasani (OMA)
8 February 2023; 18:00	3× (suspension) 1× (red card)	Report	5× (suspension) 1× (red card)	Princess Sumaya Hall, Amman; Referees: Al-Dughaishi, Al Hasani (OMA)

10 February 2023; 16:00	Kuwait	25–34	Iraq	Princess Sumaya Hall, Amman; Referees: Razakbergenova, Allayarova (UZB)
10 February 2023; 16:00	Sl. Salem, Al-Saad 7	(12–14)	Hama Saleh 9	Princess Sumaya Hall, Amman; Referees: Razakbergenova, Allayarova (UZB)
10 February 2023; 16:00	5× (suspension)	Report	5× (suspension)	Princess Sumaya Hall, Amman; Referees: Razakbergenova, Allayarova (UZB)

10 February 2023; 18:00	Jordan	21–37	India	Princess Sumaya Hall, Amman; Referees: Al-Dughaishi, Al Hasani (OMA)
10 February 2023; 18:00	Naser, S. Obeidat 4	(12–18)	Nidhi 10	Princess Sumaya Hall, Amman; Referees: Al-Dughaishi, Al Hasani (OMA)
10 February 2023; 18:00	3× (suspension)	Report	1× (yellow card) 3× (suspension)	Princess Sumaya Hall, Amman; Referees: Al-Dughaishi, Al Hasani (OMA)

11 February 2023; 16:00	India	40–12	Kuwait	Princess Sumaya Hall, Amman; Referees: Al-Dughaishi, Al Hasani (OMA)
11 February 2023; 16:00	Bhawna 9	(22–3)	Al-Saad 8	Princess Sumaya Hall, Amman; Referees: Al-Dughaishi, Al Hasani (OMA)
11 February 2023; 16:00	4× (suspension)	Report	1× (yellow card) 6× (suspension)	Princess Sumaya Hall, Amman; Referees: Al-Dughaishi, Al Hasani (OMA)

11 February 2023; 18:00	Jordan	28–20	Iraq	Princess Sumaya Hall, Amman; Referees: Razakbergenova, Allayarova (UZB)
11 February 2023; 18:00	S. Obeidat 8	(16–5)	Mohammed 9	Princess Sumaya Hall, Amman; Referees: Razakbergenova, Allayarova (UZB)
11 February 2023; 18:00	2× (yellow card) 1× (suspension)	Report	4× (suspension)	Princess Sumaya Hall, Amman; Referees: Razakbergenova, Allayarova (UZB)

13 February 2023; 16:00	India	35–23	Iraq	Princess Sumaya Hall, Amman; Referees: Al-Dughaishi, Al Hasani (OMA)
13 February 2023; 16:00	Meenu 6	(17–9)	Hama Saleh 9	Princess Sumaya Hall, Amman; Referees: Al-Dughaishi, Al Hasani (OMA)
13 February 2023; 16:00	1× (yellow card) 4× (suspension)	Report	3× (suspension)	Princess Sumaya Hall, Amman; Referees: Al-Dughaishi, Al Hasani (OMA)

13 February 2023; 18:00	Jordan	28–15	Kuwait	Princess Sumaya Hall, Amman; Referees: Razakbergenova, Allayarova (UZB)
13 February 2023; 18:00	Mahmoud 7	(14–10)	Sl. Salem 8	Princess Sumaya Hall, Amman; Referees: Razakbergenova, Allayarova (UZB)
13 February 2023; 18:00	4× (suspension)	Report	4× (suspension)	Princess Sumaya Hall, Amman; Referees: Razakbergenova, Allayarova (UZB)

14 February 2023; 16:00	Iraq	27–19	Kuwait	Princess Sumaya Hall, Amman; Referees: Al-Dughaishi, Al Hasani (OMA)
14 February 2023; 16:00	Hama Saleh 13	(13–11)	Al-Salboukh 8	Princess Sumaya Hall, Amman; Referees: Al-Dughaishi, Al Hasani (OMA)
14 February 2023; 16:00	1× (yellow card) 6× (suspension)	Report	3× (suspension)	Princess Sumaya Hall, Amman; Referees: Al-Dughaishi, Al Hasani (OMA)

14 February 2023; 18:00	India	28–21	Jordan	Princess Sumaya Hall, Amman; Referees: Allayarova, Razakbergenova (UZB)
14 February 2023; 18:00	Priyanka Thakur 8	(12–8)	S. Obeidat 6	Princess Sumaya Hall, Amman; Referees: Allayarova, Razakbergenova (UZB)
14 February 2023; 18:00	1× (suspension)	Report	2× (suspension)	Princess Sumaya Hall, Amman; Referees: Allayarova, Razakbergenova (UZB)

== Awards ==
2023 AHF Women's President Cup Champions

India
1st title

Team roster: Nidhi Sharma, Kirti Singh, Deepa Devi, Nikki, Diksha Kumari, Priyanka Thakur, Shalini Thakur, Arula Thakur, Priyanka Rathore, Pooja Kanwar, Champa, Shailja Sharma, Hem Lata, Payal, Kijal, Meenu, Simran, Bhawna, Priyanka, Mitali Sharma
Head Coach: Sachin Choudhary

=== All-star Team ===
The All-star Team was announced on 14 February 2023.

Position	Player
Goalkeeper	(India) Diksha Kumari
Left wing	(Jordan) Faten Al-Hamaideh
Left back	(Iraq) Jenan Mahmoud
Centre back	(Jordan) Fallak Obeidat
Right back	(Kuwait) Aisha Al-Saad
Right wing	(India) Priyanka Thakur
Pivot	(Jordan) Sondos Obeidat
MVP	(India) Nidhi Sharma

== Statistics ==
=== Top goalscorers ===
Rank	Name	Goals	Shots	%
1	(Iraq) Mast Hama Saleh	48	94	51
2	(India) Bhawana	38	58	66
3	(Iraq) Iman Mohammed	34	64	53
4	(India) Nidhi Sharma	33	40	83
4	(India) Mitali Sharma	33	58	57
6	(India) Priyanka Thakur	32	46	70
6	(Jordan) Sondos Obeidat	32	55	58
6	(Kuwait) Aisha Al-Saad	32	66	48
9	(India) Shalini Thakur	31	40	78
10	(Kuwait) Slmah Salem	29	63	46

=== Top goalkeepers ===
Rank	Name	%	Saves	Shots
1	(India) Hem Lata	58	7	12
2	(India) Diksha Kumari	53	79	148
2	(India) Simran	53	21	40
4	(Kuwait) Sarah Salem	50	4	8
5	(Jordan) Mera Gammoh	46	45	97
6	(Jordan) Aya Obeidat	44	12	27
7	(Jordan) Leema Abeda	33	33	99
8	(Iraq) Hawzhee Malazada	31	21	68
9	(Kuwait) Loulwah Al-Enezi	27	18	68
9	(Kuwait) Jumana Al-Shamali	27	19	71

=== Top assists ===
Rank	Name	Team	Assists
1	Bhawana	India	19
2	Nidhi Sharma	India	16
3	Shalini Thakur	India	14
4	Diksha Kumari	India	10
5	Slmah Salem	Kuwait	9
6	Mitali Sharma	India	8
6	Lubna Salameh	Jordan	8
8	Pooja Kanwar	India	5
9	Tamara Khlaifat	Jordan	3
9	Mast Hama Saleh	Iraq	3
9	Iman Mohammed	Iraq	3
9	Kaneaw Hussein	Iraq	3
9	Roaa Naser	Jordan	3
9	Aysheh Al-Majali	Jordan	3
