= Iraq women's national handball team =

National team of Iraq

Iraq

Information
- Association: Iraqi Handball Federation

Colours
1st	2nd

Results

Summer Olympics
- Appearances: No

World Championship
- Appearances: No
- Last updated on Unknown.

Iraq women's national handball team
Medal record

West Asian Handball Championship
Bronze medal – third place	2016 Doha	Team

The Iraq women's national handball team is the national team of Iraq. It is governed by the Iraqi Handball Federation and takes part in international handball competitions.

== Competition record ==
=== West Asian Women's Handball Championship ===
- 2016: (bronze)
- 2017: 6th

== Results in West Asian Women's Handball Championship ==
=== 2016 West Asian Women's Handball Championship ===
"Qatar win West Asian Women Handball Championship title"

16 September 2017; 17:00	Iraq	5 – 25	Jordan	Doha, Qatar
16 September 2017; 17:00		(4 – 13)		Doha, Qatar

17 September 2017; 18:30	Iraq	13 – 30	Qatar	Doha, Qatar
17 September 2017; 18:30		(6 – 13)		Doha, Qatar

19 September 2017; 17:00	Iraq	21 – 14	United Arab Emirates	Doha, Qatar
19 September 2017; 17:00		(9 – 5)		Doha, Qatar

=== 2017 West Asian Women's Handball Championship ===
"JORDAN TO HOST REGIONAL HANDBALL TOURNAMENT".

15 February 2018; 15:00	Iraq	8 – 43	Iran	Princess Sumaya Hall, Amman; Referees: Al-Wahibi, Al-Shahi (OMA)
15 February 2018; 15:00	Mohammed 3	(3 – 22)	Bapiri 9	Princess Sumaya Hall, Amman; Referees: Al-Wahibi, Al-Shahi (OMA)
15 February 2018; 15:00	4× (yellow card) 2× (suspension)		3× (yellow card) 3× (suspension)	Princess Sumaya Hall, Amman; Referees: Al-Wahibi, Al-Shahi (OMA)

16 February 2018; 19:00	Qatar	33 – 4	Iraq	Princess Sumaya Hall, Amman; Referees: Hamdan, Al-Ramadena (JOR)
16 February 2018; 19:00	Soliman, Khalfan 5	(13 – 2)	Mohammed 2	Princess Sumaya Hall, Amman; Referees: Hamdan, Al-Ramadena (JOR)
16 February 2018; 19:00			3× (yellow card) 6× (suspension)	Princess Sumaya Hall, Amman; Referees: Hamdan, Al-Ramadena (JOR)

18 February 2018; 17:00	Iraq	14 – 29	Jordan	Princess Sumaya Hall, Amman; Referees: Al-Kuaibi, Malaekah (KSA)
18 February 2018; 17:00	Mohammed 5	(8 – 13)	Obiedat 11	Princess Sumaya Hall, Amman; Referees: Al-Kuaibi, Malaekah (KSA)
18 February 2018; 17:00	3× (yellow card) 5× (suspension)		1× (yellow card) 2× (suspension)	Princess Sumaya Hall, Amman; Referees: Al-Kuaibi, Malaekah (KSA)

19 February 2018; 15:00	Iraq	15 – 33	Syria	Princess Sumaya Hall, Amman; Referees: Hamdan, Al-Ramadena (JOR)
19 February 2018; 15:00	Hameed 4	(6 – 21)	Hallom 8	Princess Sumaya Hall, Amman; Referees: Hamdan, Al-Ramadena (JOR)
19 February 2018; 15:00	3× (yellow card) 5× (suspension)		1× (yellow card) 2× (suspension)	Princess Sumaya Hall, Amman; Referees: Hamdan, Al-Ramadena (JOR)

21 February 2018; 14:00	Lebanon	25 – 18	Iraq	Princess Sumaya Hall, Amman; Referees: Gheisarian, Gheisarian (IRI)
21 February 2018; 14:00	Ammari 16	(14 – 10)	Karim, Abdalla 5	Princess Sumaya Hall, Amman; Referees: Gheisarian, Gheisarian (IRI)
21 February 2018; 14:00	2× (yellow card) 3× (suspension)		3× (yellow card) 8× (suspension)	Princess Sumaya Hall, Amman; Referees: Gheisarian, Gheisarian (IRI)
