= Handball at the Arab Games =

- Handball
- Frequency: Every four years
- Inaugurated: 1961 (Morocco) Casablanca
- Most recent: 2011 (Qatar) Doha
- Most successful team(s): Egypt (EGY) (6 titles)

Handball has been an Arab Games event since the third edition in 1961 in Casablanca, Morocco.

== Men's tournaments ==
=== Summaries ===
| Year | Host | Final | | | Third-place game | | |
| Year | Host | Champion | Score | Second Place | Third Place | Score | Fourth Place |
|---|---|---|---|---|---|---|---|
| 1961; Details | (Morocco); Casablanca | UA Republic | – | Morocco | Jordan | – | |
| 1965; Details | (United Arab Republic); Cairo | UA Republic | – | Palestine | Syria | – | |
| 1976; Details | (Syria); Damascus | Syria | – | Jordan | | – | |
| 1985; Details | (Morocco); Rabat | Tunisia | – | Algeria | Morocco | – | Saudi Arabia |
| 1992; Details | (Syria); Damascus | Egypt | – | Saudi Arabia | Tunisia | – | |
| 1997 | (Lebanon); Beirut | canceled | | | canceled | | |
| 1999; Details | (Jordan); Amman | Egypt | 26 – 20 | Morocco | Jordan / Saudi Arabia; No 3rd place match | | |
| 2004 | (Algeria); Algiers | canceled | | | canceled | | |
| 2007; Details | (Egypt); Cairo | Egypt | ^{n/a} | Algeria | Saudi Arabia | ^{n/a} | Jordan |
| 2011; Details | (Qatar); Doha | Egypt | 26 – 21 | Qatar | Tunisia | 23 – 21 | Saudi Arabia |
| 2023; Details | (Algeria) (5 cities)^{a} | Qatar | 37 – 24 | Saudi Arabia | Algeria | 31 – 29 | Iraq |

^n/a A round-robin tournament determined the final standings.
^a Arab Games helds in 5 cities (Algiers, Oran, Constantine, Annaba and Tipaza). Handball tournament helds in Oran.

== Women's tournaments ==
=== Summaries ===
| Year | Host | Final | | | Third-place game | | |
| Year | Host | Champion | Score | Second Place | Third Place | Score | Fourth Place |
|---|---|---|---|---|---|---|---|
| 1985; Details | (Morocco); Rabat | Tunisia | | Algeria | Morocco | | |
| 1992; Details | (Syria); Damascus | Algeria | | Tunisia | Syria | | |
| 1997 | (Lebanon); Beirut | canceled | | | canceled | | |
| 1999; Details | (Jordan); Amman | Algeria | | Tunisia | Egypt / Jordan; No 3rd place match | | |
| 2004 | (Algeria); Algiers | canceled | | | canceled | | |
| 2007 | (Egypt); Cairo | canceled | | | canceled | | |
| 2011; Details | (Qatar); Doha | Algeria | ^{n/a} | Tunisia | Jordan | ^{n/a} | Qatar |
| 2023; Details | (Algeria) (5 cities)^{a} | canceled | | | canceled | | |

^n/a A round-robin tournament determined the final standings.
^a Arab Games helds in 5 cities (Algiers, Oran, Constantine, Annaba and Tipaza). Handball tournament helds in Oran.

=== Participating nations ===
| Nation | 85 (Morocco) | 92 (Syria) | 99 (Jordan) | 11 (Qatar) | Years |
|---|---|---|---|---|---|
| Algeria | 2nd | 1st | 1st | 1st | 4 |
| Egypt | | | 3rd* | | 1 |
| Jordan | | | 3rd* | 3rd | 2 |
| Morocco | 3rd | | | | 1 |
| Qatar | | | | 4th | 1 |
| Syria | | 3rd | | | 1 |
| Tunisia | 1st | 2nd | 2nd | 2nd | 4 |

* Egypt and Jordan third both.
