= Handball at the 2025 Asian Youth Games =

2025 Asian Youth Games competition

- Venue: Umm Al-Hassam Hall
- Dates: 19–30 October 2025

Handball at the 2025 Asian Youth Games was held in Manama, Bahrain from 19 to 30 October 2025 at the Umm Al-Hassam Hall.

== Medalists ==
Event	Gold	Silver	Bronze
Boys	Saudi Arabia; Ali Al-Osif; Ali Al-Darorah; Fadel Al-Ramdan; Ahmed Abu Al-Rahi; Hyder Al-Dassary; Mohammed Al-Sihati; Ahmed Al-Obaidi; Basel Al-Abdulmohsin; Ahmed Abo Abeed; Elyas Al-Aradi; Ibrahim Al-Khowildi; Mhanad Al-Saihati; Haidar Al-Tarooti; Hassn Al-Elaiwat; Abbas Al-Awazim; Wafi Al-Sahwan	Kuwait; Saad Al-Khamees; Abdullatif Salmin; Omar Madwah; Ahmad Al-Shammari; Mohammad Al-Farhan; Mohammad Al-Theyab; Fahad Al-Mahboub; Saqer Al-Obaid; Nayef Al-Ajmi; Saleem Al-Mahmoud; Yaqoub Hasan; Abdulhadi Barrak; Hussain Al-Ajmi; Faisal Al-Enezi; Abdulwahab Al-Mutawa	Bahrain; Karrar Ahmed; Haidar Salman; Qassim Sabt; Hussain Abadi; Mohammed Tarrada; Sayed Majeed Al-Muhafda; Ahmed Eid; Ahmed Abdulla; Mahdi Jaafar Ali; Ali Al-Mahroos; Ahmed Al-Samahiji; Mahmood Ali Ahmed; Abuthar Yateem; Ali Adel Hasan; Mohammed Aadam; Ali Jadeed
Girls	Iran; Fatemeh Olfatnia; Diana Rezaei; Tina Khoshnejad; Negar Babasafari; Fatemeh Behzadi; Sarina Rostami; Sana Fotouhi; Dina Derakhshanmehr; Reihaneh Hosseini; Hasti Arianfar; Aseman Badvi; Arezoo Taleei; Parisan Ahmadkhosravi; Hasti Sheikhalizadeh; Zahra Afshari; Melika Safikhani	China; Cheng Yahan; Fu Yujie; Liu Yutong; Zhang Shuoyan; Liu Yixuan; Zhang Yuxin; Yu Siqi; Sha Yiyao; Zhang Jingwen; Zhu Yifan; Fu Zhaojun; Sulayiman Anaguli; Ding Xiyue; Li Zifeng; Wang Xiaoyan; Zhou Zixuan	Kazakhstan; Aiym Tursyn; Anastassiya Grigoryeva; Anzhelika Orlovskaya; Nurdana Kyrgyzbay; Yana Frankovskaya; Korkem Lutfullayeva; Zhanerke Ertazayeva; Guldana Maral; Anastassiya Golushko; Kyzzhibek Galym; Banu Kopzhan; Anastassiya Lobanova; Darya Mozgovaya; Elina Burmistrova; Sofiya Shikhalyova; Balgyn Abibulla

== Medal table ==
Rank	Nation	Gold	Silver	Bronze	Total
1	Iran (IRI)	1	0	0	1
1	Saudi Arabia (KSA)	1	0	0	1
3	China (CHN)	0	1	0	1
3	Kuwait (KUW)	0	1	0	1
5	Bahrain (BRN)	0	0	1	1
5	Kazakhstan (KAZ)	0	0	1	1
Totals (6 entries)		2	2	2	6

== Results ==
=== Boys ===
==== Preliminary round ====
===== Group A =====
Pos	Team	Pld	W	D	L	GF	GA	GD	Pts
1	Saudi Arabia	4	4	0	0	180	61	+119	8
2	Bahrain	4	3	0	1	169	78	+91	6
3	Jordan	4	2	0	2	95	100	−5	4
4	Hong Kong	4	1	0	3	84	111	−27	2
5	Maldives	4	0	0	4	50	228	−178	0

Source: AHF

19 October; 13:00	Maldives	7–71	Saudi Arabia	Umm Al-Hassam Hall, Manama; Referees: Noochan, Suansiri (THA)
19 October; 13:00	Shaheem 2	(3–35)	Al-Osif 15	Umm Al-Hassam Hall, Manama; Referees: Noochan, Suansiri (THA)
19 October; 13:00		Report	1× (suspension)	Umm Al-Hassam Hall, Manama; Referees: Noochan, Suansiri (THA)

19 October; 19:00	Hong Kong	12–36	Bahrain	Umm Al-Hassam Hall, Manama; Referees: Rezaei, Yazdanian (IRI)
19 October; 19:00	Or 3	(5–18)	Jadeed 6	Umm Al-Hassam Hall, Manama; Referees: Rezaei, Yazdanian (IRI)
19 October; 19:00	1× (suspension) 1× (red card)	Report	3× (suspension) 1× (red card)	Umm Al-Hassam Hall, Manama; Referees: Rezaei, Yazdanian (IRI)

20 October; 17:00	Jordan	11–33	Saudi Arabia	Umm Al-Hassam Hall, Manama; Referees: Ismoilov, Ismoilov (UZB)
20 October; 17:00	Herzallah, Shebli, Abusharkh 2	(5–16)	Al-Obaidi 8	Umm Al-Hassam Hall, Manama; Referees: Ismoilov, Ismoilov (UZB)
20 October; 17:00	2× (suspension) 1× (red card)	Report	2× (suspension)	Umm Al-Hassam Hall, Manama; Referees: Ismoilov, Ismoilov (UZB)

20 October; 19:00	Maldives	13–74	Bahrain	Umm Al-Hassam Hall, Manama; Referees: Al-Shaib, Al-Naemi (QAT)
20 October; 19:00	Shaheem 8	(6–34)	K. Ahmed 24	Umm Al-Hassam Hall, Manama; Referees: Al-Shaib, Al-Naemi (QAT)
20 October; 19:00	5× (suspension)	Report	1× (suspension)	Umm Al-Hassam Hall, Manama; Referees: Al-Shaib, Al-Naemi (QAT)

23 October; 12:00	Saudi Arabia	43–16	Hong Kong	Umm Al-Hassam Hall, Manama; Referees: Rezaei, Yazdanian (IRI)
23 October; 12:00	Al-Obaidi 9	(23–5)	Li Z. 7	Umm Al-Hassam Hall, Manama; Referees: Rezaei, Yazdanian (IRI)
23 October; 12:00	3× (suspension)	Report	1× (yellow card) 1× (suspension)	Umm Al-Hassam Hall, Manama; Referees: Rezaei, Yazdanian (IRI)

23 October; 16:00	Maldives	20–42	Jordan	Umm Al-Hassam Hall, Manama; Referees: Razakbergenova, Allayarova (UZB)
23 October; 16:00	Shaheem 10	(14–24)	Al-Abdallah, Abusharkh 10	Umm Al-Hassam Hall, Manama; Referees: Razakbergenova, Allayarova (UZB)
23 October; 16:00	1× (suspension)	Report	3× (suspension)	Umm Al-Hassam Hall, Manama; Referees: Razakbergenova, Allayarova (UZB)

25 October; 17:00	Hong Kong	41–10	Maldives	Umm Al-Hassam Hall, Manama; Referees: Noochan, Suansiri (THA)
25 October; 17:00	Liu 6	(18–4)	Ibrahim, Shaheem, Musthafa 2	Umm Al-Hassam Hall, Manama; Referees: Noochan, Suansiri (THA)
25 October; 17:00	1× (suspension)	Report	6× (suspension)	Umm Al-Hassam Hall, Manama; Referees: Noochan, Suansiri (THA)

25 October; 19:00	Jordan	20–32	Bahrain	Umm Al-Hassam Hall, Manama; Referees: Rezaei, Yazdanian (IRI)
25 October; 19:00	Obeidat 5	(11–19)	Sabt 9	Umm Al-Hassam Hall, Manama; Referees: Rezaei, Yazdanian (IRI)
25 October; 19:00	1× (yellow card) 2× (suspension) 1× (red card)	Report	1× (suspension)	Umm Al-Hassam Hall, Manama; Referees: Rezaei, Yazdanian (IRI)

26 October; 13:00	Hong Kong	15–22	Jordan	Umm Al-Hassam Hall, Manama; Referees: Al-Naseem, Al-Enezi (KUW)
26 October; 13:00	Li Z. 5	(10–10)	Al-Sobaihi 5	Umm Al-Hassam Hall, Manama; Referees: Al-Naseem, Al-Enezi (KUW)
26 October; 13:00	1× (yellow card) 2× (suspension) 1× (red card)	Report	5× (suspension)	Umm Al-Hassam Hall, Manama; Referees: Al-Naseem, Al-Enezi (KUW)

26 October; 19:00	Bahrain	27–33	Saudi Arabia	Umm Al-Hassam Hall, Manama; Referees: Al-Wahibi, Al-Shahi (OMA)
26 October; 19:00	Tarrada 6	(9–17)	Al-Obaidi 9	Umm Al-Hassam Hall, Manama; Referees: Al-Wahibi, Al-Shahi (OMA)
26 October; 19:00	1× (suspension)	Report	1× (yellow card) 4× (suspension) 1× (red card)	Umm Al-Hassam Hall, Manama; Referees: Al-Wahibi, Al-Shahi (OMA)

===== Group B =====
Pos	Team	Pld	W	D	L	GF	GA	GD	Pts
1	Kuwait	5	4	0	1	181	118	+63	8
2	China	5	4	0	1	170	123	+47	8
3	Iran	5	4	0	1	162	90	+72	8
4	United Arab Emirates	5	2	0	3	131	164	−33	4
5	Thailand	5	1	0	4	91	178	−87	2
6	Kazakhstan	5	0	0	5	124	186	−62	0

Source: AHF

19 October; 11:00	China	40–25	United Arab Emirates	Umm Al-Hassam Hall, Manama; Referees: Al-Wahibi, Al-Shahi (OMA)
19 October; 11:00	Qin 10	(17–12)	Al-Obeidli, I. Al-Suwaidi 5	Umm Al-Hassam Hall, Manama; Referees: Al-Wahibi, Al-Shahi (OMA)
19 October; 11:00	4× (suspension)	Report	4× (suspension)	Umm Al-Hassam Hall, Manama; Referees: Al-Wahibi, Al-Shahi (OMA)

19 October; 15:00	Iran	42–12	Thailand	Umm Al-Hassam Hall, Manama; Referees: Ali, Al-Aradi (BHR)
19 October; 15:00	Hessehzadeh 8	(20–3)	Nambanha 3	Umm Al-Hassam Hall, Manama; Referees: Ali, Al-Aradi (BHR)
19 October; 15:00	3× (suspension)	Report	2× (suspension)	Umm Al-Hassam Hall, Manama; Referees: Ali, Al-Aradi (BHR)

19 October; 17:00	Kuwait	42–26	Kazakhstan	Umm Al-Hassam Hall, Manama; Referees: Kwon, Kim (KOR)
19 October; 17:00	Salmin 10	(22–12)	Sudarikov 6	Umm Al-Hassam Hall, Manama; Referees: Kwon, Kim (KOR)
19 October; 17:00	1× (suspension)	Report	6× (suspension)	Umm Al-Hassam Hall, Manama; Referees: Kwon, Kim (KOR)

21 October; 16:00	Iran	20–17	China	Umm Al-Hassam Hall, Manama; Referees: Kwon, Kim (KOR)
21 October; 16:00	Javidi 5	(9–9)	Qin 8	Umm Al-Hassam Hall, Manama; Referees: Kwon, Kim (KOR)
21 October; 16:00	1× (yellow card) 5× (suspension)	Report	1× (yellow card) 3× (suspension)	Umm Al-Hassam Hall, Manama; Referees: Kwon, Kim (KOR)

21 October; 18:00	Thailand	15–43	Kuwait	Umm Al-Hassam Hall, Manama; Referees: Al-Wahibi, Al-Shahi (OMA)
21 October; 18:00	Nisaidee, Wisinchai 4	(10–23)	Madwah 7	Umm Al-Hassam Hall, Manama; Referees: Al-Wahibi, Al-Shahi (OMA)
21 October; 18:00	5× (suspension)	Report	1× (suspension)	Umm Al-Hassam Hall, Manama; Referees: Al-Wahibi, Al-Shahi (OMA)

21 October; 20:00	United Arab Emirates	35–27	Kazakhstan	Umm Al-Hassam Hall, Manama; Referees: Ahmed, Ebrahim (BHR)
21 October; 20:00	Al-Yassi 8	(16–10)	Sudarikov 9	Umm Al-Hassam Hall, Manama; Referees: Ahmed, Ebrahim (BHR)
21 October; 20:00	1× (yellow card) 6× (suspension)	Report	5× (suspension)	Umm Al-Hassam Hall, Manama; Referees: Ahmed, Ebrahim (BHR)

23 October; 10:00	China	35–17	Thailand	Umm Al-Hassam Hall, Manama; Referees: Al-Shaib, Al-Naemi (QAT)
23 October; 10:00	Zhou Y. 8	(21–8)	Wisinchai 6	Umm Al-Hassam Hall, Manama; Referees: Al-Shaib, Al-Naemi (QAT)
23 October; 10:00	1× (suspension)	Report	2× (suspension)	Umm Al-Hassam Hall, Manama; Referees: Al-Shaib, Al-Naemi (QAT)

23 October; 14:00	Kazakhstan	25–45	Iran	Umm Al-Hassam Hall, Manama; Referees: Kwon, Kim (KOR)
23 October; 14:00	Sudarikov 7	(13–22)	Fattahi, Khanlari 6	Umm Al-Hassam Hall, Manama; Referees: Kwon, Kim (KOR)
23 October; 14:00	1× (suspension)	Report	1× (suspension)	Umm Al-Hassam Hall, Manama; Referees: Kwon, Kim (KOR)

23 October; 18:00	Kuwait	37–21	United Arab Emirates	Umm Al-Hassam Hall, Manama; Referees: Ali, Al-Aradi (BHR)
23 October; 18:00	N. Al-Ajmi 7	(20–10)	I. Al-Suwaidi 6	Umm Al-Hassam Hall, Manama; Referees: Ali, Al-Aradi (BHR)
23 October; 18:00	2× (suspension)	Report	5× (suspension) 1× (red card)	Umm Al-Hassam Hall, Manama; Referees: Ali, Al-Aradi (BHR)

24 October; 16:00	Thailand	23–20	Kazakhstan	Umm Al-Hassam Hall, Manama; Referees: Ismoilov, Ismoilov (UZB)
24 October; 16:00	Wisinchai 5	(9–6)	Sudarikov 6	Umm Al-Hassam Hall, Manama; Referees: Ismoilov, Ismoilov (UZB)
24 October; 16:00	4× (suspension)	Report	1× (suspension) 1× (red card)	Umm Al-Hassam Hall, Manama; Referees: Ismoilov, Ismoilov (UZB)

24 October; 18:00	China	37–35	Kuwait	Umm Al-Hassam Hall, Manama; Referees: Kwon, Kim (KOR)
24 October; 18:00	Qin 8	(22–18)	Hasan 10	Umm Al-Hassam Hall, Manama; Referees: Kwon, Kim (KOR)
24 October; 18:00	1× (yellow card) 3× (suspension) 1× (red card)	Report	3× (suspension)	Umm Al-Hassam Hall, Manama; Referees: Kwon, Kim (KOR)

24 October; 20:00	United Arab Emirates	12–36	Iran	Umm Al-Hassam Hall, Manama; Referees: Lau, Tan (HKG)
24 October; 20:00	A.A. Al-Blooshi, Al-Yassi, Al-Hu. Al-Shadadi 2	(5–14)	Hessehzadeh 6	Umm Al-Hassam Hall, Manama; Referees: Lau, Tan (HKG)
24 October; 20:00	1× (suspension)	Report	2× (suspension)	Umm Al-Hassam Hall, Manama; Referees: Lau, Tan (HKG)

26 October; 11:00	United Arab Emirates	38–24	Thailand	Umm Al-Hassam Hall, Manama; Referees: Tan, Lau (HKG)
26 October; 11:00	Al-Hu. Al-Shadadi 8	(19–13)	Nisaidee 7	Umm Al-Hassam Hall, Manama; Referees: Tan, Lau (HKG)
26 October; 11:00	3× (suspension)	Report	3× (suspension)	Umm Al-Hassam Hall, Manama; Referees: Tan, Lau (HKG)

26 October; 15:00	Kazakhstan	26–41	China	Umm Al-Hassam Hall, Manama; Referees: Ahmed, Ebrahim (BHR)
26 October; 15:00	Karsybay 7	(9–21)	Liu J. 9	Umm Al-Hassam Hall, Manama; Referees: Ahmed, Ebrahim (BHR)
26 October; 15:00		Report	2× (suspension)	Umm Al-Hassam Hall, Manama; Referees: Ahmed, Ebrahim (BHR)

26 October; 17:00	Kuwait	24–19	Iran	Umm Al-Hassam Hall, Manama; Referees: Ismoilov, Ismoilov (UZB)
26 October; 17:00	Hasan 7	(12–9)	Ahmadifar 6	Umm Al-Hassam Hall, Manama; Referees: Ismoilov, Ismoilov (UZB)
26 October; 17:00	3× (suspension)	Report	1× (suspension)	Umm Al-Hassam Hall, Manama; Referees: Ismoilov, Ismoilov (UZB)

==== Final round ====
Semifinals
28 October
Saudi Arabia	32
China	24
28 October
Kuwait	23
Bahrain	21

Gold medal match
30 October
Saudi Arabia	29
Kuwait	28
Bronze medal match
30 October
China	28
Bahrain	32

===== Semifinals =====
28 October; 17:00	Saudi Arabia	32–24	China	Umm Al-Hassam Hall, Manama; Referees: Kim, Kwon (KOR)
28 October; 17:00	Al-Obaidi 11	(15–15)	Qin 6	Umm Al-Hassam Hall, Manama; Referees: Kim, Kwon (KOR)
28 October; 17:00	1× (yellow card) 2× (suspension)	Report	1× (suspension)	Umm Al-Hassam Hall, Manama; Referees: Kim, Kwon (KOR)

28 October; 19:00	Kuwait	23–21	Bahrain	Umm Al-Hassam Hall, Manama; Referees: Rezaei, Yazdanian (IRI)
28 October; 19:00	Salmin 9	(13–11)	Yateem 6	Umm Al-Hassam Hall, Manama; Referees: Rezaei, Yazdanian (IRI)
28 October; 19:00	1× (yellow card) 7× (suspension)	Report	1× (yellow card) 2× (suspension)	Umm Al-Hassam Hall, Manama; Referees: Rezaei, Yazdanian (IRI)

===== Bronze medal match =====
30 October; 17:00	China	28–32	Bahrain	Umm Al-Hassam Hall, Manama; Referees: Al-Shahi, Al-Wahibi (OMA)
30 October; 17:00	Liu Z. 14	(13–14)	Al-Samahiji 10	Umm Al-Hassam Hall, Manama; Referees: Al-Shahi, Al-Wahibi (OMA)
30 October; 17:00	4× (suspension)	Report	4× (suspension)	Umm Al-Hassam Hall, Manama; Referees: Al-Shahi, Al-Wahibi (OMA)

===== Gold medal match =====
30 October; 19:00	Saudi Arabia	29–28	Kuwait	Umm Al-Hassam Hall, Manama; Referees: Ismoilov, Ismoilov (UZB)
30 October; 19:00	Al-Obaidi 10	(15–13)	Salmin 7	Umm Al-Hassam Hall, Manama; Referees: Ismoilov, Ismoilov (UZB)
30 October; 19:00	2× (suspension) 1× (red card)	Report	1× (yellow card) 3× (suspension)	Umm Al-Hassam Hall, Manama; Referees: Ismoilov, Ismoilov (UZB)

=== Girls ===
Pos	Team	Pld	W	D	L	GF	GA	GD	Pts
1	Iran	6	6	0	0	196	135	+61	12
2	China	6	5	0	1	207	140	+67	10
3	Kazakhstan	6	4	0	2	204	153	+51	8
4	Uzbekistan	6	3	0	3	189	169	+20	6
5	India	6	1	1	4	159	203	−44	3
6	Thailand	6	1	1	4	136	188	−52	3
7	Hong Kong	6	0	0	6	124	227	−103	0

Source: AHF

20 October; 11:00	Uzbekistan	39–26	India	Umm Al-Hassam Hall, Manama; Referees: Mozaffari, Mazaheri (IRI)
20 October; 11:00	Sharipboeva 11	(20–11)	Devi, Kanishka 7	Umm Al-Hassam Hall, Manama; Referees: Mozaffari, Mazaheri (IRI)
20 October; 11:00	2× (suspension)	Report	1× (yellow card) 1× (suspension)	Umm Al-Hassam Hall, Manama; Referees: Mozaffari, Mazaheri (IRI)

20 October; 13:00	Kazakhstan	40–24	Hong Kong	Umm Al-Hassam Hall, Manama; Referees: Razakbergenova, Allayarova (UZB)
20 October; 13:00	Kopzhan 7	(21–13)	Wong P. 7	Umm Al-Hassam Hall, Manama; Referees: Razakbergenova, Allayarova (UZB)
20 October; 13:00	1× (suspension)	Report	4× (suspension)	Umm Al-Hassam Hall, Manama; Referees: Razakbergenova, Allayarova (UZB)

20 October; 15:00	China	25–30	Iran	Umm Al-Hassam Hall, Manama; Referees: Al-Naseem, Al-Enezi (KUW)
20 October; 15:00	Liu Yi., Li 6	(12–11)	Badvi, Ahmadkhosravi 10	Umm Al-Hassam Hall, Manama; Referees: Al-Naseem, Al-Enezi (KUW)
20 October; 15:00	5× (suspension)	Report	4× (suspension)	Umm Al-Hassam Hall, Manama; Referees: Al-Naseem, Al-Enezi (KUW)

21 October; 10:00	Iran	27–24	Uzbekistan	Umm Al-Hassam Hall, Manama; Referees: Lau, Tan (HKG)
21 October; 10:00	Badvi 10	(12–11)	Bayjanova 7	Umm Al-Hassam Hall, Manama; Referees: Lau, Tan (HKG)
21 October; 10:00	3× (suspension)	Report	1× (yellow card) 5× (suspension) 1× (red card)	Umm Al-Hassam Hall, Manama; Referees: Lau, Tan (HKG)

21 October; 12:00	India	26–39	Kazakhstan	Umm Al-Hassam Hall, Manama; Referees: Noochan, Suansiri (THA)
21 October; 12:00	Muskan 9	(15–19)	Kyrgyzbay 10	Umm Al-Hassam Hall, Manama; Referees: Noochan, Suansiri (THA)
21 October; 12:00	1× (suspension)	Report		Umm Al-Hassam Hall, Manama; Referees: Noochan, Suansiri (THA)

21 October; 14:00	China	33–15	Thailand	Umm Al-Hassam Hall, Manama; Referees: Rostom, Sallat (SYR)
21 October; 14:00	Cheng 6	(18–8)	Wongsa 5	Umm Al-Hassam Hall, Manama; Referees: Rostom, Sallat (SYR)
21 October; 14:00	2× (suspension)	Report	3× (suspension)	Umm Al-Hassam Hall, Manama; Referees: Rostom, Sallat (SYR)

24 October; 10:00	Thailand	37–24	Hong Kong	Umm Al-Hassam Hall, Manama; Referees: Mozaffari, Mazaheri (IRI)
24 October; 10:00	Khachonrit, Yodkhum 8	(17–9)	Lau S., Tsang 5	Umm Al-Hassam Hall, Manama; Referees: Mozaffari, Mazaheri (IRI)
24 October; 10:00	2× (suspension)	Report	3× (suspension)	Umm Al-Hassam Hall, Manama; Referees: Mozaffari, Mazaheri (IRI)

24 October; 12:00	Uzbekistan	29–37	China	Umm Al-Hassam Hall, Manama; Referees: Al-Naseem, Al-Enezi (KUW)
24 October; 12:00	Erkaboeva 7	(16–18)	Zhang S. 9	Umm Al-Hassam Hall, Manama; Referees: Al-Naseem, Al-Enezi (KUW)
24 October; 12:00	1× (suspension)	Report	3× (suspension)	Umm Al-Hassam Hall, Manama; Referees: Al-Naseem, Al-Enezi (KUW)

24 October; 14:00	Iran	27–23	Kazakhstan	Umm Al-Hassam Hall, Manama; Referees: Ahmed, Ebrahim (BHR)
24 October; 14:00	Badvi 7	(8–13)	Lobanova 6	Umm Al-Hassam Hall, Manama; Referees: Ahmed, Ebrahim (BHR)
24 October; 14:00	1× (suspension)	Report	2× (suspension)	Umm Al-Hassam Hall, Manama; Referees: Ahmed, Ebrahim (BHR)

25 October; 11:00	Uzbekistan	23–31	Kazakhstan	Umm Al-Hassam Hall, Manama; Referees: Al-Shaib, Al-Naemi (QAT)
25 October; 11:00	Sharipboeva, Majidova, Bayjanova 4	(15–15)	Ertazayeva 10	Umm Al-Hassam Hall, Manama; Referees: Al-Shaib, Al-Naemi (QAT)
25 October; 11:00	3× (suspension)	Report	2× (suspension)	Umm Al-Hassam Hall, Manama; Referees: Al-Shaib, Al-Naemi (QAT)

25 October; 13:00	Thailand	26–26	India	Umm Al-Hassam Hall, Manama; Referees: Rostom, Sallat (SYR)
25 October; 13:00	Yodkhum 9	(8–15)	Devi 9	Umm Al-Hassam Hall, Manama; Referees: Rostom, Sallat (SYR)
25 October; 13:00	2× (suspension)	Report	5× (suspension)	Umm Al-Hassam Hall, Manama; Referees: Rostom, Sallat (SYR)

25 October; 15:00	Hong Kong	14–38	China	Umm Al-Hassam Hall, Manama; Referees: Allayarova, Razakbergenova (UZB)
25 October; 15:00	Lau S., Wong P. 4	(6–20)	Fu Y., Sha 9	Umm Al-Hassam Hall, Manama; Referees: Allayarova, Razakbergenova (UZB)
25 October; 15:00	2× (suspension)	Report	1× (suspension)	Umm Al-Hassam Hall, Manama; Referees: Allayarova, Razakbergenova (UZB)

27 October; 11:00	Iran	32–16	Thailand	Umm Al-Hassam Hall, Manama; Referees: Thabet, Al-Mudhaweb (BHR)
27 October; 11:00	Badvi 7	(16–9)	Wongsa 5	Umm Al-Hassam Hall, Manama; Referees: Thabet, Al-Mudhaweb (BHR)
27 October; 11:00	2× (suspension)	Report	2× (suspension)	Umm Al-Hassam Hall, Manama; Referees: Thabet, Al-Mudhaweb (BHR)

27 October; 13:00	Kazakhstan	30–35	China	Umm Al-Hassam Hall, Manama; Referees: Rostom, Sallat (SYR)
27 October; 13:00	Kyrgyzbay 8	(15–16)	Cheng 10	Umm Al-Hassam Hall, Manama; Referees: Rostom, Sallat (SYR)
27 October; 13:00	3× (suspension)	Report	1× (suspension)	Umm Al-Hassam Hall, Manama; Referees: Rostom, Sallat (SYR)

27 October; 15:00	India	33–17	Hong Kong	Umm Al-Hassam Hall, Manama; Referees: Razakbergenova, Allayarova (UZB)
27 October; 15:00	N. Yadav 12	(16–9)	Tsang 6	Umm Al-Hassam Hall, Manama; Referees: Razakbergenova, Allayarova (UZB)
27 October; 15:00	2× (suspension)	Report	5× (suspension)	Umm Al-Hassam Hall, Manama; Referees: Razakbergenova, Allayarova (UZB)

28 October; 11:00	Kazakhstan	41–18	Thailand	Umm Al-Hassam Hall, Manama; Referees: Lau, Tan (HKG)
28 October; 11:00	Kyrgyzbay 10	(19–9)	Wanna, Dindam 3	Umm Al-Hassam Hall, Manama; Referees: Lau, Tan (HKG)
28 October; 11:00	2× (suspension)	Report	3× (suspension)	Umm Al-Hassam Hall, Manama; Referees: Lau, Tan (HKG)

28 October; 13:00	Hong Kong	24–42	Uzbekistan	Umm Al-Hassam Hall, Manama; Referees: Mozaffari, Mazaheri (IRI)
28 October; 13:00	Lau S. 7	(8–15)	Turgunova 9	Umm Al-Hassam Hall, Manama; Referees: Mozaffari, Mazaheri (IRI)
28 October; 13:00	2× (suspension)	Report	3× (suspension)	Umm Al-Hassam Hall, Manama; Referees: Mozaffari, Mazaheri (IRI)

28 October; 15:00	India	26–43	Iran	Umm Al-Hassam Hall, Manama; Referees: Noochan, Suansiri (THA)
28 October; 15:00	Muskan, Devi, N. Yadav 6	(13–23)	Badvi 12	Umm Al-Hassam Hall, Manama; Referees: Noochan, Suansiri (THA)
28 October; 15:00	1× (suspension)	Report	3× (suspension)	Umm Al-Hassam Hall, Manama; Referees: Noochan, Suansiri (THA)

30 October; 11:00	Thailand	24–32	Uzbekistan	Umm Al-Hassam Hall, Manama; Referees: Al-Naseem, Al-Enezi (KUW)
30 October; 11:00	Dindam 7	(11–18)	Bayjanova 11	Umm Al-Hassam Hall, Manama; Referees: Al-Naseem, Al-Enezi (KUW)
30 October; 11:00	1× (yellow card) 1× (suspension)	Report	2× (suspension)	Umm Al-Hassam Hall, Manama; Referees: Al-Naseem, Al-Enezi (KUW)

30 October; 13:00	Hong Kong	21–37	Iran	Umm Al-Hassam Hall, Manama; Referees: Ahmed, Ebrahim (BHR)
30 October; 13:00	Wong P. 9	(13–17)	Sheikhalizadeh 11	Umm Al-Hassam Hall, Manama; Referees: Ahmed, Ebrahim (BHR)
30 October; 13:00	2× (suspension)	Report	1× (suspension)	Umm Al-Hassam Hall, Manama; Referees: Ahmed, Ebrahim (BHR)

30 October; 15:00	China	39–22	India	Umm Al-Hassam Hall, Manama; Referees: Mozaffari, Mazaheri (IRI)
30 October; 15:00	Zhang S. 11	(19–9)	Devi 12	Umm Al-Hassam Hall, Manama; Referees: Mozaffari, Mazaheri (IRI)
30 October; 15:00	3× (suspension)	Report	1× (suspension)	Umm Al-Hassam Hall, Manama; Referees: Mozaffari, Mazaheri (IRI)
