= 2017 West Asian Women's Handball Championship =

- Logo of 2nd West Asian Women's Handball Championship

Tournament details
- Host country: Jordan
- Venue: 1 (in 1 host city)
- Dates: 15 – 21 February 2018
- Teams: 6 (from 1 confederation)

Final positions
- Champions: Iran (1st title)
- Runners-up: Jordan
- Third place: Syria
- Fourth place: Qatar (Defending Champion)

Tournament statistics
- Matches played: 15
- Goals scored: 705 (47 per match)
- Top scorer(s): Ones Ammari (LIB) (79 Goals)

Awards
- Best player: Ones Ammari (LIB)

‌The 2017 West Asian Women's Handball Championship was the second edition of the championship held under the aegis of the Asian Handball Federation. The championship was hosted by the Jordan Handball Federation at Princess Sumaya Hall, Amman (Jordan) from 15 to 21 February 2018.

The championship was previously awarded to Bahrain and scheduled to take place in December 2017 but due to unavoidable circumstances the championship was postponed and then awarded to the Jordan.

== Participating teams ==
Country	Previous appearances in championship
Iran	0 (debut)
Iraq	1 (2016)
Jordan	1 (2016)
Lebanon	0 (debut)
Qatar	1 (**2016**)
Syria	0 (debut)

^{1} Bold indicates champion for that year, Italics indicates host.

== Referees ==
The following four referee pairs were selected for the championship.

Referees
Iran	Ahmad Gheisarian; Amir Gheisarian
Jordan	Khaled Hamdan; Mohammad Al-Ramadena

Referees
Oman	Khamis Al-Wahibi; Omer Al-Shahi
Saudi Arabia	Hussain Al-Kuaibi; Mohammed Malaekah

== Round-robin ==
Team	Pld	W	D	L	GF	GA	GD	Pts
Iran	5	5	0	0	161	66	+95	10
Jordan	5	4	0	1	137	101	+36	8
Syria	5	3	0	2	113	107	+6	6
Qatar	5	1	1	3	120	131	−11	3
Lebanon	5	1	1	3	115	137	−22	3
Iraq	5	0	0	5	59	163	−104	0

15 February 2018; 15:00	**Iraq**	**8 – 43**	**Iran**	Princess Sumaya Hall, Amman; Referees: Al-Wahibi, Al-Shahi (OMA)
15 February 2018; 15:00	Mohammed 3	(3 – 22)	Bapiri 9	Princess Sumaya Hall, Amman; Referees: Al-Wahibi, Al-Shahi (OMA)
15 February 2018; 15:00	4× (yellow card) 2× (suspension)		3× (yellow card) 3× (suspension)	Princess Sumaya Hall, Amman; Referees: Al-Wahibi, Al-Shahi (OMA)

15 February 2018; 17:00	**Jordan**	**34 – 23**	**Lebanon**	Princess Sumaya Hall, Amman; Referees: Al-Kuaibi, Malaekah (KSA)
15 February 2018; 17:00	Naser 9	(15 – 13)	Ammari 13	Princess Sumaya Hall, Amman; Referees: Al-Kuaibi, Malaekah (KSA)
15 February 2018; 17:00	3× (yellow card) 5× (suspension)		4× (yellow card) 5× (suspension)	Princess Sumaya Hall, Amman; Referees: Al-Kuaibi, Malaekah (KSA)

15 February 2018; 19:00	**Qatar**	**24 – 27**	**Syria**	Princess Sumaya Hall, Amman; Referees: Gheisarian, Gheisarian (IRI)
15 February 2018; 19:00	Al-Khulaifi 6	(11 – 14)	Morad 12	Princess Sumaya Hall, Amman; Referees: Gheisarian, Gheisarian (IRI)
15 February 2018; 19:00	4× (yellow card) 8× (suspension) 1× (red card)		3× (yellow card) 4× (suspension)	Princess Sumaya Hall, Amman; Referees: Gheisarian, Gheisarian (IRI)

16 February 2018; 15:00	**Iran**	**29 – 19**	**Lebanon**	Princess Sumaya Hall, Amman; Referees: Al-Wahibi, Al-Shahi (OMA)
16 February 2018; 15:00	Yuosefi 7	(16 – 8)	Ammari 16	Princess Sumaya Hall, Amman; Referees: Al-Wahibi, Al-Shahi (OMA)
16 February 2018; 15:00	3× (yellow card) 5× (suspension)		3× (yellow card) 1× (suspension)	Princess Sumaya Hall, Amman; Referees: Al-Wahibi, Al-Shahi (OMA)

16 February 2018; 17:00	**Syria**	**19 – 27**	**Jordan**	Princess Sumaya Hall, Amman; Referees: Gheisarian, Gheisarian (IRI)
16 February 2018; 17:00	Soliman 5	(6 – 13)	Rawashdeh, Obiedat 5	Princess Sumaya Hall, Amman; Referees: Gheisarian, Gheisarian (IRI)
16 February 2018; 17:00	2× (yellow card) 1× (suspension)		3× (yellow card)	Princess Sumaya Hall, Amman; Referees: Gheisarian, Gheisarian (IRI)

16 February 2018; 19:00	**Qatar**	**33 – 4**	**Iraq**	Princess Sumaya Hall, Amman; Referees: Hamdan, Al-Ramadena (JOR)
16 February 2018; 19:00	Soliman, Khalfan 5	(13 – 2)	Mohammed 2	Princess Sumaya Hall, Amman; Referees: Hamdan, Al-Ramadena (JOR)
16 February 2018; 19:00			3× (yellow card) 6× (suspension)	Princess Sumaya Hall, Amman; Referees: Hamdan, Al-Ramadena (JOR)

18 February 2018; 15:00	**Syria**	**26 – 18**	**Lebanon**	Princess Sumaya Hall, Amman; Referees: Gheisarian, Gheisarian (IRI)
18 February 2018; 15:00	Ismael 8	(13 – 11)	Ammari 13	Princess Sumaya Hall, Amman; Referees: Gheisarian, Gheisarian (IRI)
18 February 2018; 15:00	4× (yellow card) 6× (suspension)		3× (yellow card) 7× (suspension)	Princess Sumaya Hall, Amman; Referees: Gheisarian, Gheisarian (IRI)

18 February 2018; 17:00	**Iraq**	**14 – 29**	**Jordan**	Princess Sumaya Hall, Amman; Referees: Al-Kuaibi, Malaekah (KSA)
18 February 2018; 17:00	Mohammed 5	(8 – 13)	Obiedat 11	Princess Sumaya Hall, Amman; Referees: Al-Kuaibi, Malaekah (KSA)
18 February 2018; 17:00	3× (yellow card) 5× (suspension)		1× (yellow card) 2× (suspension)	Princess Sumaya Hall, Amman; Referees: Al-Kuaibi, Malaekah (KSA)

18 February 2018; 19:00	**Iran**	**38 – 16**	**Qatar**	Princess Sumaya Hall, Amman; Referees: Al-Wahibi, Al-Shahi (OMA)
18 February 2018; 19:00	three players 7	(16 – 7)	Khalfan 4	Princess Sumaya Hall, Amman; Referees: Al-Wahibi, Al-Shahi (OMA)
18 February 2018; 19:00	3× (yellow card) 3× (suspension)		2× (yellow card) 1× (suspension)	Princess Sumaya Hall, Amman; Referees: Al-Wahibi, Al-Shahi (OMA)

19 February 2018; 15:00	**Iraq**	**15 – 33**	**Syria**	Princess Sumaya Hall, Amman; Referees: Hamdan, Al-Ramadena (JOR)
19 February 2018; 15:00	Hameed 4	(6 – 21)	Hallom 8	Princess Sumaya Hall, Amman; Referees: Hamdan, Al-Ramadena (JOR)
19 February 2018; 15:00	3× (yellow card) 5× (suspension)		1× (yellow card) 2× (suspension)	Princess Sumaya Hall, Amman; Referees: Hamdan, Al-Ramadena (JOR)

19 February 2018; 17:00	**Lebanon**	**30 – 30**	**Qatar**	Princess Sumaya Hall, Amman; Referees: Gheisarian, Gheisarian (IRI)
19 February 2018; 17:00	Ammari 21	(12 – 13)	Khalfan 11	Princess Sumaya Hall, Amman; Referees: Gheisarian, Gheisarian (IRI)
19 February 2018; 17:00	2× (yellow card) 3× (suspension)		3× (yellow card) 5× (suspension)	Princess Sumaya Hall, Amman; Referees: Gheisarian, Gheisarian (IRI)

19 February 2018; 19:00	**Jordan**	**15 – 28**	**Iran**	Princess Sumaya Hall, Amman; Referees: Al-Wahibi, Al-Shahi (OMA)
19 February 2018; 19:00	Sanduqa 5	(9 – 16)	Fallahi 5	Princess Sumaya Hall, Amman; Referees: Al-Wahibi, Al-Shahi (OMA)
19 February 2018; 19:00	2× (yellow card) 3× (suspension)		3× (yellow card) 3× (suspension)	Princess Sumaya Hall, Amman; Referees: Al-Wahibi, Al-Shahi (OMA)

21 February 2018; 12:00	**Iran**	**23 – 8**	**Syria**	Princess Sumaya Hall, Amman; Referees: Al-Kuaibi, Malaekah (KSA)
21 February 2018; 12:00	Bapiri 6	(8 – 4)	Al-Dalati, Soliman 2	Princess Sumaya Hall, Amman; Referees: Al-Kuaibi, Malaekah (KSA)
21 February 2018; 12:00	3× (yellow card) 1× (suspension)		2× (yellow card) 1× (suspension)	Princess Sumaya Hall, Amman; Referees: Al-Kuaibi, Malaekah (KSA)

21 February 2018; 14:00	**Lebanon**	**25 – 18**	**Iraq**	Princess Sumaya Hall, Amman; Referees: Gheisarian, Gheisarian (IRI)
21 February 2018; 14:00	Ammari 16	(14 – 10)	Karim, Abdalla 5	Princess Sumaya Hall, Amman; Referees: Gheisarian, Gheisarian (IRI)
21 February 2018; 14:00	2× (yellow card) 3× (suspension)		3× (yellow card) 8× (suspension)	Princess Sumaya Hall, Amman; Referees: Gheisarian, Gheisarian (IRI)

21 February 2018; 16:00	**Jordan**	**32 – 17**	**Qatar**	Princess Sumaya Hall, Amman; Referees: Al-Wahibi, Al-Shahi (OMA)
21 February 2018; 16:00	Naser 11	(12 – 10)	Khalfan 7	Princess Sumaya Hall, Amman; Referees: Al-Wahibi, Al-Shahi (OMA)
21 February 2018; 16:00	3× (yellow card) 2× (suspension)		1× (yellow card) 3× (suspension)	Princess Sumaya Hall, Amman; Referees: Al-Wahibi, Al-Shahi (OMA)

== Final standings ==
Rank	Team
1st place, gold medalist(s)	Iran (1st title)
2nd place, silver medalist(s)	Jordan
3rd place, bronze medalist(s)	Syria
4	Qatar
5	Lebanon
6	Iraq

== Medal summary ==
Gold	Silver	Bronze
Iran Fatemehsadat Mousavi; Sheida Fallahi; Sheida Abolghasemi; Samireh Ali Ramaei; Maryam Yuosefi; Fatemeh Khalili Behfar; Shaghayegh Bapiri; Mina Vatanparast; Zeinab Bazrafkan; Roya Noroozi; Shima Zare; Seyran Ahmadi; Zahra Faghihi; Elnaz Ghasemi; Sanaz Rajabi; Mozhgan Ghahremani Team Officials Kameli Fatemeh; Shafeyan Nashmin; Barzkar Masoumeh	Jordan Ayah Obiedat; Nahed Rawashdeh; Yasmeen Al-Zawahreh; Roaa Naser; Amal Obiedat; Sondos Obiedat; Hanadi Al-Ash; Lubna Salameh; Fallak Obiedat; Mera Gammoh; Leema Abeda; Sara Al-Halabeih; Dina Sanduqa; Sham Al-Damen; Aysheh Al-Majali; Raneem Abdelhadi; Rozana Al-Ash; Faten Al-Hamaidaeh Team Officials Adnene Belhareth; Muwafag Malkawi; Wlla Al-Said; Shadi Al-Sakran	Syria Madlean Khanem; Khetam Ismael; Nasrin Al-Dalati; Shereen Al-Hazzam; Ola Abo Ghazala; Heba Ghadir; Enas Al-Aisami; Eman Morad; Abeer Sallat; Rouah Al-Asaad; Riman Soliman; Hanan Amaya; Nadra Jajoul; Nawar Hallom; Najla Al-Sharki; Alaa Al-Mhamid Team Officials Samer Abouebed; Mahmood Sasila; Arwa Al-Kasar

=== Top goalscorers ===
Rank	Name	Team	Goals	Shots	%
1	Ones Ammari	Lebanon	79	113	69.9
2	Rouza Khalfan	Qatar	36	64	56.3
3	Shaghayegh Bapiri	Iran	31	35	88.6
3	Roaa Naser	Jordan	31	53	58.5
5	Aya Soliman	Qatar	25	43	58.1
6	Amal Obiedat	Jordan	24	42	57.1
7	Sanaz Rajabi	Iran	23	34	67.6
8	Nehad Rawashdeh	Jordan	22	32	68.8
9	Sondos Obiedat	Jordan	20	37	54.1
10	Sheida Fallahi	Iran	19	28	67.9

=== Top goalkeepers ===
Rank	Name	Team	%	Saves	Shots
1	Seyran Ahmadi	Iran	65.4	34	52
2	Leema Abeda	Jordan	63.2	12	19
3	Fatemeh Khalili Behfar	Iran	50	26	52
4	Zeinab Bazrafkan	Iran	48.8	21	43
5	Ayah Obiedat	Jordan	45.7	64	140
6	Rouah Al-Asaad	Syria	35.4	17	48
7	Madlean Khanem	Syria	33.3	38	114
7	Sham Al-Damen	Jordan	33.3	9	27
9	Sara Petkouska	Lebanon	31.4	38	121
10	Bashae Al-Kuwari	Qatar	25.9	14	54
