= Iraqi Women's Handball League =

- Current season, competition or edition: 2025–26 Iraqi League
- Sport: Handball
- First season: 2012; 14 years ago
- Administrator: IHF
- No. of teams: 7 teams
- Country: Iraq
- Confederation: AHF
- Continent: Asia
- Most recent champion: University of Sulaymaniyah (1st title) (2025–26)
- Most titles: Erbil Girls Club (3 titles)
- Level on pyramid: Level 1
- Relegation to: National 2
- Domestic cups: Iraq Cup; Iraq Super Cup
- International cups: AHF Asian Championship; Arab Women's Championship

The Iraqi Women's Handball League ( Arabic : الدوري العراقي لكرة اليد للسيدات ) is the highest-level women's handball league competition in Iraq. It is organized under the authority of the Iraqi Handball Federation, the national governing body for handball in Iraq. The competition brings together women's handball clubs and university clubs from different parts of the country and serves as the principal domestic championship for women's handball in Iraq. The league forms part of the Iraqi domestic handball competition system and is separate from the men's Iraqi Handball League. Its participating clubs have included teams from Baghdad, Erbil, Kirkuk, Najaf, Sulaymaniyah and other Iraqi cities and institutions.

== Competition format ==
The format of the Iraqi Women's Handball League has varied between seasons. In the 2025–26 season, the competition was played as a single round-robin league. Seven teams participated, with each team playing six matches. The team finishing with the most points was declared champion. Contemporary reporting also confirms that the competition was played in one league phase, with matches initially staged in Baghdad before the final rounds were held in Sulaymaniyah. The final round concluded in July 2026, with the University of Sulaymaniyah defeating Al-Kufa 21–15 to secure the championship.

== Titles by Clubs ==
Clubs by titles won
Rank	Club	Titles #	Years Won
1	Erbil Girls Club	3	2012, 2013, 2014
2	Erbil Club	2	2019, 2021
2	Kirkuk Girls Club	2	2023, 2024
4	Najaf Girls Club	1	2016
4	Zanko University Erbil	1	2022
4	University of Sulaymaniyah	1	2025–26

== Winners List ==
Champions by season
No.	Season	Champions	Runners-up
1	2025–26	University of Sulaymaniyah	Al-Kufa Club
2	2024	Kirkuk Girls Club	Al-Najma Club
3	2023	Kirkuk Girls Club	Erbil Club
4	2022	Zanko University Erbil	Erbil Club
5	2021	Erbil Club	Erbil Girls Club
-	2020	Competition not held	
6	2019	Erbil Club	Aphrodite Club
-	2018	Competition not held	
-	2017	Competition not held	
7	2016	Najaf Girls Club	Aphrodite Club
	2015	Competition not held	
8	2014	Erbil Girls Club	Iraq Club
9	2013	Erbil Girls Club	Al-Qalaa Club
10	2012	Erbil Girls Club	Baghdad Girls Club

Sources :
