= Handball at the 2011 Arab Games =

Handball at the 2011 Pan Arab Games
- Location: Doha, Qatar
- Dates: 10-21 December

Handball at the 2011 Pan Arab Games will be held in Doha, Qatar from December 10 to 21, 2011. In this tournament, 11 teams will play in the men's competition, and 4 teams will participate in the women's competition. It is yet unknown whether the Tunisian team will field a different team from the World championship squad. Kuwait withdrew from the tournament.

== Results ==
=== Men ===
==== Preliminary round ====
===== Group A =====
Team	Pld	W	D	L	GF	GA	GD	Pts
Egypt	3	2	1	0	131	51	+80	5
Qatar	3	2	1	0	109	58	+51	5
Morocco	3	1	0	2	77	83	−6	2
Sudan	3	0	0	3	21	146	−125	0

11 December; 18:00	Qatar	51–10	Sudan	Aspire Zone - Women's Indoor Hall, Doha
11 December; 18:00		(24–5)		Aspire Zone - Women's Indoor Hall, Doha

12 December; 16:00	Egypt	46–19	Morocco	Aspire Zone - Women's Indoor Hall, Doha
12 December; 16:00		(19–13)		Aspire Zone - Women's Indoor Hall, Doha

13 December; 12:00	Sudan	5–58	Egypt	Aspire Zone - Women's Indoor Hall, Doha
13 December; 12:00		(0–26)		Aspire Zone - Women's Indoor Hall, Doha

15 December; 18:00	Qatar	31–21	Morocco	Aspire Zone - Women's Indoor Hall, Doha
15 December; 18:00		(16–7)		Aspire Zone - Women's Indoor Hall, Doha

17 December; 12:00	Morocco	37–6	Sudan	Aspire Zone - Women's Indoor Hall, Doha
17 December; 12:00		(19–4)		Aspire Zone - Women's Indoor Hall, Doha

17 December; 18:00	Qatar	27–27	Egypt	Aspire Zone - Women's Indoor Hall, Doha
17 December; 18:00		(13–14)		Aspire Zone - Women's Indoor Hall, Doha

===== Group B =====
Team	Pld	W	D	L	GF	GA	GD	Pts
Tunisia	4	4	0	0	142	59	+83	8
Saudi Arabia	4	3	0	1	123	64	+59	6
Bahrain	4	2	0	2	121	86	+35	4
Jordan	4	1	0	3	85	69	+16	2
Djibouti	4	0	0	4	39	212	−173	0

11 December; 14:00	Tunisia	27–11	Jordan	Aspire Zone - Women's Indoor Hall, Doha
11 December; 14:00		(8–4)		Aspire Zone - Women's Indoor Hall, Doha

11 December; 16:00	Bahrain	18–21	Saudi Arabia	Aspire Zone - Women's Indoor Hall, Doha
11 December; 16:00		(9–12)		Aspire Zone - Women's Indoor Hall, Doha

12 December; 12:00	Djibouti	7–55	Saudi Arabia	Aspire Zone - Women's Indoor Hall, Doha
12 December; 12:00		(4–23)		Aspire Zone - Women's Indoor Hall, Doha

12 December; 14:00	Tunisia	32–23	Bahrain	Aspire Zone - Women's Indoor Hall, Doha
12 December; 14:00		(16–14)		Aspire Zone - Women's Indoor Hall, Doha

13 December; 14:00	Jordan	24–28	Bahrain	Aspire Zone - Women's Indoor Hall, Doha
13 December; 14:00		(14–14)		Aspire Zone - Women's Indoor Hall, Doha

13 December; 16:00	Djibouti	9–55	Tunisia	Aspire Zone - Women's Indoor Hall, Doha
13 December; 16:00		(3–25)		Aspire Zone - Women's Indoor Hall, Doha

15 December; 14:00	Saudi Arabia	16–28	Tunisia	Aspire Zone - Women's Indoor Hall, Doha
15 December; 14:00		(6–14)		Aspire Zone - Women's Indoor Hall, Doha

15 December; 16:00	Jordan	50–14	Djibouti	Aspire Zone - Women's Indoor Hall, Doha
15 December; 16:00		(27–7)		Aspire Zone - Women's Indoor Hall, Doha

17 December; 14:00	Bahrain	52–9	Djibouti	Aspire Zone - Women's Indoor Hall, Doha
17 December; 14:00		(28–3)		Aspire Zone - Women's Indoor Hall, Doha

17 December; 16:00	Saudi Arabia	31–21	Jordan	Aspire Zone - Women's Indoor Hall, Doha
17 December; 16:00		(18–10)		Aspire Zone - Women's Indoor Hall, Doha

==== Final round ====
Semifinal
December 19
Egypt	31
Saudi Arabia	21
December 19
Tunisia	20
Qatar	22

Gold medal game
December 21
Egypt	26
Qatar	21
Bronze medal game
December 21
Saudi Arabia	21
Tunisia	23

===== Semifinals =====
19 December; 16:00	Egypt	31–21	Saudi Arabia	Aspire Zone - Women's Indoor Hall, Doha
19 December; 16:00		(15–8)		Aspire Zone - Women's Indoor Hall, Doha

19 December; 18:00	Tunisia	20–22	Qatar	Aspire Zone - Women's Indoor Hall, Doha
19 December; 18:00		(6–9)		Aspire Zone - Women's Indoor Hall, Doha

===== Bronze medal match =====
21 December; 16:00	Saudi Arabia	21–23	Tunisia	Aspire Zone - Women's Indoor Hall, Doha
21 December; 16:00		(13–13)		Aspire Zone - Women's Indoor Hall, Doha

===== Gold medal match =====
21 December; 18:00	Egypt	26–21	Qatar	Aspire Zone - Women's Indoor Hall, Doha
21 December; 18:00		(13–10)		Aspire Zone - Women's Indoor Hall, Doha

==== Final standing ====
Rank	Team
1st place, gold medalist(s)	Egypt
2nd place, silver medalist(s)	Qatar
3rd place, bronze medalist(s)	Tunisia
4	Saudi Arabia
5	Bahrain
6	Morocco
7	Jordan
8	Sudan
9	Djibouti

=== Women ===
==== Final round ====
Team	Pld	W	D	L	GF	GA	GD	Pts
Algeria	6	5	1	0	221	85	+136	11
Tunisia	6	4	1	1	240	94	+146	9
Jordan	6	2	0	4	93	212	−119	4
Qatar	6	0	0	6	73	236	−163	0

12 December; 18:00	Qatar	15–24	Jordan	Aspire Zone - Women's Indoor Hall, Doha
12 December; 18:00		(9–12)		Aspire Zone - Women's Indoor Hall, Doha

13 December; 18:00	Tunisia	16–23	Algeria	Aspire Zone - Women's Indoor Hall, Doha
13 December; 18:00		(11–9)		Aspire Zone - Women's Indoor Hall, Doha

14 December; 16:00	Jordan	9–46	Tunisia	Aspire Zone - Women's Indoor Hall, Doha
14 December; 16:00		(4–17)		Aspire Zone - Women's Indoor Hall, Doha

14 December; 18:00	Qatar	9–46	Algeria	Aspire Zone - Women's Indoor Hall, Doha
14 December; 18:00		(4–22)		Aspire Zone - Women's Indoor Hall, Doha

16 December; 16:00	Algeria	45–9	Jordan	Aspire Zone - Women's Indoor Hall, Doha
16 December; 16:00		(20–7)		Aspire Zone - Women's Indoor Hall, Doha

16 December; 18:00	Qatar	11–49	Tunisia	Aspire Zone - Women's Indoor Hall, Doha
16 December; 18:00		(5–25)		Aspire Zone - Women's Indoor Hall, Doha

18 December; 16:00	Algeria	29–29	Tunisia	Aspire Zone - Women's Indoor Hall, Doha
18 December; 16:00		(15–12)		Aspire Zone - Women's Indoor Hall, Doha

18 December; 18:00	Jordan	23–22	Qatar	Aspire Zone - Women's Indoor Hall, Doha
18 December; 18:00		(11–9)		Aspire Zone - Women's Indoor Hall, Doha

19 December; 12:00	Tunisia	49-14	Jordan	Aspire Zone - Women's Indoor Hall, Doha
19 December; 12:00		(21-7)		Aspire Zone - Women's Indoor Hall, Doha

19 December; 14:00	Algeria	43-8	Qatar	Aspire Zone - Women's Indoor Hall, Doha
19 December; 14:00		(21-2)		Aspire Zone - Women's Indoor Hall, Doha

21 December; 11:00	Jordan	14–35	Algeria	Aspire Zone - Women's Indoor Hall, Doha
21 December; 11:00		(3–17)		Aspire Zone - Women's Indoor Hall, Doha

21 December; 13:00	Tunisia	51–8	Qatar	Aspire Zone - Women's Indoor Hall, Doha
21 December; 13:00		(18–3)		Aspire Zone - Women's Indoor Hall, Doha

==== Final standing ====
Rank	Team
1st place, gold medalist(s)	Algeria
2nd place, silver medalist(s)	Tunisia
3rd place, bronze medalist(s)	Jordan
4	Qatar
