= Jordan Handball Federation =

Governing body of handball in Jordan

Jordan Handball Federation Arabic: الاتحاد الأردني لكرة اليد JHF
- IOC nation: The Hashemite Kingdom of Jordan (JOR)
- Sport: Handball
- Other sports: Beach handball; Wheelchair handball
- Official website: www.jordanhf.com

HISTORY
- Year of formation: 1961; 64 years ago

DEMOGRAPHICS
- Number of affiliated Handball clubs: 15

AFFILIATIONS
- International federation: International Handball Federation (IHF)
- IHF member since: 1966
- Continental association: Asian Handball Federation
- National Olympic Committee: Jordan Olympic Committee
- Other affiliation(s): West Asian Handball Federation; Arab Handball Federation
- Address: Amman
- Country: Jordan

The Jordan Handball Federation (Arabic: الاتحاد الأردني لكرة اليد) is the governing body of handball and beach handball in The Hashemite Kingdom of Jordan. Founded in 1961, the Jordan Handball Federation is affiliated to the International Handball Federation and Asian Handball Federation. The Jordan Handball Federation is also affiliated to the Jordan Olympic Committee, West Asian Handball Federation and the Arab Handball Federation. It is based in Amman.

== National teams ==
- Jordan men's national handball team
- Jordan men's national junior handball team
- Jordan men's national youth handball team
- Jordan women's national handball team
- Jordan women's national junior handball team
- Jordan women's national youth handball team
- Jordan national beach handball team
- Jordan national junior beach handball team
- Jordan women's national beach handball team

== Competitions hosted ==
- 2021 Asian Women's Handball Championship
- 2018 Asian Men's Youth Handball Championship
- 2017 West Asian Women's Handball Championship
- 2016 Asian Men's Club League Handball Championship
- 2016 Asian Men's Junior Handball Championship
- 2014 Asian Men's Youth Handball Championship
- 2009 Asian Men's Club League Handball Championship
- 2009 Asian Women's Youth Handball Championship
- 2008 Asian Men's Junior Handball Championship
- 2008 Asian Men's Youth Handball Championship
- 2005 Asian Men's Club League Handball Championship
- 2002 Asian Women's Junior Handball Championship
- 1998 Asian Men's Club League Handball Championship
- 1997 Asian Women's Handball Championship
- 1987 Asian Women's Handball Championship
- 1987 Asian Men's Handball Championship
