= Palestine women's national handball team =

Palestine

Information
- Association: Palestinian Handball Association

Colours
1st	2nd

Results

Asian Championship
- Appearances: 1 (First in 2021)
- Best result: 11th (2021)
- Last updated on Unknown.

The Palestine women's national handball team is the national team of Palestine. It is governed by the Palestinian Handball Association and takes part in international handball competitions.

== Tournament history ==
=== Asian Championship ===
Year	Rank	M	W	D	L	GF	GA	Dif
(Jordan) 1987 to (Japan) 2018	Did not enter							
(Jordan) 2021	11th	5	0	0	5	50	228	−178
Total	1/18	5	0	0	5	50	228	−178
