= Syria women's national handball team =

Syria

Information
- Nickname: Nosour Qasioun (Arabic: نسور قاسيون, lit. 'Qasioun Eagles')
- Association: Syrian Arab Handball Federation
- Coach: Vladimir Gligorov

Colours
1st	2nd

Results

World Championship
- Appearances: none

Asian Championship
- Appearances: 2 (First in 1987)
- Best result: 4th (1987)
- Last updated on 16 September 2021.

Syria women's national handball team
Medal record

West Asian Handball Championship
Bronze medal – third place	2017 Amman	

Pan Arab Games
Bronze medal – third place	1992 Damascus	

The Syria women's national handball team is the national team of Syria. It is governed by the Syrian Arab Handball Federation and takes part in international handball competitions.

== History ==
The team first played at the 1987 Asian Championships.

After winning over Jordan and advancing from the group, they lost in the semifinals of the tournament with South Korea and then in the bronze medal match with Japan. Fourth place in the tournament is the biggest success of women's handball in Syria.

The team, shortly after its success at the Asian Championships, took fourth place at the home Mediterranean Games in Latakia, and in 1992 was bronze at the Pan-Arab Games in Damascus.

In 2017, after a long unsuccessful period, they won bronze medals at the West Asian Championships.

After checking out of several teams, they qualified for the 2021 Asian Championships in Amman, Jordan.

== Competition record ==
=== Asian Championship ===
Champions Runners up Third place Fourth place

Year	Rank	M	W	D	L	GF	GA	Dif
(Jordan) 1987	4th	4	1	0	3	48	114	−66
(China) 1989	Did not enter							
(Japan) 1991	Did not enter							
(China) 1993	Did not enter							
(South Korea) 1995	Did not enter							
(Jordan) 1997	Did not enter							
(Japan) 1999	Did not enter							
(China) 2000	Did not enter							
(Kazakhstan) 2002	Did not enter							
(Japan) 2004	Did not enter							
(China) 2006	Did not enter							
(Thailand) 2008	Did not enter							
(Kazakhstan) 2010	Did not enter							
(Indonesia) 2012	Did not enter							
(Indonesia) 2015	Did not enter							
(South Korea) 2017	Did not enter							
(Japan) 2018	Did not enter							
(Jordan) 2021	8th	7	2	0	5	174	206	−32
Total	2/18	11	3	0	8	222	320	−98

=== West Asian Championship ===
Year	Rank	M	W	D	L	GF	GA	Dif
(Qatar) 2016	Did not enter							
(Jordan) 2017	3rd	5	3	0	2	113	107	+6
(Lebanon) 2019	Cancelled due to insufficient number of teams							
Total	1/2	5	3	0	2	113	107	+6

=== Mediterranean Games ===
- (Syria) 1987 – 4th

=== Pan Arab Games ===
- (Syria) 1992 – (bronze)

== Current squad ==
Team roster for the 2021 Asian Women's Handball Championship:

Coach: Vladimir Gligorov

- Madeleine Ghanem
- Roaa Al-Asaad
- Hanan Amaya
- Naglaa Al-Sharqi
- Ola Abu Ghazaleh
- Lynn Satouf
- Raghad Fadel
- Hajar Namouz
- Aya Al-Zanati
- Lynn Abbas
- Joy Al-Jarrah
- Rasha Abdullah
- Majdoleen Sarita
- Mais Asi
- Linda Al-Hamwi
- Lujain Al-Hamwi
- Hadeel Hussein
