= 2021 Asian Women's Handball Championship =

Tournament details
- Host country: Jordan
- Venue: 1 (in 1 host city)
- Dates: 15–25 September
- Teams: 11 (from 1 confederation)

Final positions
- Champions: South Korea (15th title)
- Runners-up: Japan
- Third place: Kazakhstan
- Fourth place: Iran

Tournament statistics
- Matches played: 34
- Goals scored: 1,836 (54 per match)

The 2021 Asian Women's Handball Championship was the 18th edition of the championship held from 15 to 25 September 2021 in Amman, Jordan under the aegis of Asian Handball Federation. It is the third time in history that the championship is organised by the Jordan Handball Federation. It also acted as the qualification tournament for the 2021 World Women's Handball Championship, with the top five teams from the championship directly qualifying for the event to be held in Spain.

On 9 August 2020, the AHF decided to postpone the championship due to the COVID-19 pandemic. Previously, the championship was scheduled to take place from 10 to 22 December 2020. On 3 August 2021, the AHF announced to move the event from South Korea to Jordan due to the pandemic.

South Korea won their fifth straight and 15th overall title after defeating Japan in the final.

== Draw ==
The draw was held in Amman, Jordan on 11 August 2021 at 18:00.

=== Seeding ===
Teams were seeded according to the AHF COC regulations and rankings of the previous edition of the championship. Teams who had not participate in the previous edition were in Pot 5. As organizer, Jordan had the right to choose their group.

| Pot 1 | Pot 2 | Pot 3 | Pot 4 | Pot 5 |
|---|---|---|---|---|
| South Korea; Jordan | Japan; Kazakhstan | Iran; Hong Kong | ~~India~~ → Syria; Singapore | ~~Afghanistan~~ → Palestine; Kuwait; ~~Qatar~~; Uzbekistan |

- For the first time, China did not participate.
- Since 2018 countries from Oceania (Australia and New Zealand) may participate in the Asian Championships and may qualify for the World Championship if one of them finishes within the top five.
- In August 2021, Afghanistan, who was drawn in Group B, withdrew from the championship due to the fall of Kabul. In the same time, India, also drawn in Group B, also withdrew from the championship due to unavoidable circumstances. As a consequence, Palestine and Syria were added to Group B to replace those two countries.
- In September 2021, a few days before the start of the championship, Qatar withdrew from the championship due to the COVID-19 pandemic.

== Preliminary round ==
All times are local (UTC+3).

=== Group A ===
| Pos | Team | Pld | W | D | L | GF | GA | GD | Pts | Qualification |
|---|---|---|---|---|---|---|---|---|---|---|
| 1 | South Korea | 4 | 4 | 0 | 0 | 164 | 58 | +106 | 8 | Semifinals |
| 2 | Kazakhstan | 4 | 3 | 0 | 1 | 115 | 115 | 0 | 6 | Semifinals |
| 3 | Hong Kong | 4 | 2 | 0 | 2 | 95 | 114 | −19 | 4 | 5–8th place semifinals |
| 4 | Uzbekistan | 4 | 1 | 0 | 3 | 107 | 122 | −15 | 2 | 5–8th place semifinals |
| 5 | Singapore | 4 | 0 | 0 | 4 | 59 | 131 | −72 | 0 | 9th place game |

Rules for classification: 1) points; 2) head-to-head points; 3) head-to-head goal difference; 4) head-to-head number of goals scored; 5) goal difference.

| 15 September 2021; 11:00 | Kazakhstan | 33–18 | Singapore | Princess Sumaya Hall, Amman |
| 15 September 2021; 11:00 | | (14–12) | | Princess Sumaya Hall, Amman |

| 15 September 2021; 13:00 | South Korea | 45–19 | Uzbekistan | Princess Sumaya Hall, Amman; Referees: Marzieh, Hassanzadah (IRI) |
| 15 September 2021; 13:00 | Kim Ji-h. 5 | (22–8) | Bahromova, Yusopova 7 | Princess Sumaya Hall, Amman; Referees: Marzieh, Hassanzadah (IRI) |
| 15 September 2021; 13:00 | 3× (suspension) | Report | 3× (suspension) | Princess Sumaya Hall, Amman; Referees: Marzieh, Hassanzadah (IRI) |

| 16 September 2021; 11:00 | Kazakhstan | 31–29 | Hong Kong | Princess Sumaya Hall, Amman |
| 16 September 2021; 11:00 | | (17–14) | | Princess Sumaya Hall, Amman |

| 16 September 2021; 13:00 | South Korea | 39–9 | Singapore | Princess Sumaya Hall, Amman; Referees: Mozafarivanani, Mazaheri (IRI) |
| 16 September 2021; 13:00 | Yun 7 | (21–5) | four players 2 | Princess Sumaya Hall, Amman; Referees: Mozafarivanani, Mazaheri (IRI) |
| 16 September 2021; 13:00 | 2× (yellow card) | Report | 5× (suspension) | Princess Sumaya Hall, Amman; Referees: Mozafarivanani, Mazaheri (IRI) |

| 18 September 2021; 15:00 | Singapore | 16–26 | Hong Kong | Princess Sumaya Hall, Amman |
| 18 September 2021; 15:00 | | (7–12) | | Princess Sumaya Hall, Amman |

| 18 September 2021; 19:00 | Uzbekistan | 28–31 | Kazakhstan | Princess Sumaya Hall, Amman |
| 18 September 2021; 19:00 | | (16–14) | | Princess Sumaya Hall, Amman |

| 19 September 2021; 13:00 | Singapore | 16–33 | Uzbekistan | Princess Sumaya Hall, Amman |
| 19 September 2021; 13:00 | | (10–17) | | Princess Sumaya Hall, Amman |

| 19 September 2021; 19:00 | South Korea | 40–10 | Hong Kong | Princess Sumaya Hall, Amman; Referees: Mozafarivanani, Mazaheri (IRI) |
| 19 September 2021; 19:00 | Jo 10 | (20–3) | Lo, Wong Y. 2 | Princess Sumaya Hall, Amman; Referees: Mozafarivanani, Mazaheri (IRI) |
| 19 September 2021; 19:00 | 2× (yellow card) 3× (suspension) | Report | 2× (suspension) | Princess Sumaya Hall, Amman; Referees: Mozafarivanani, Mazaheri (IRI) |

| 21 September 2021; 11:00 | Hong Kong | 30–27 | Uzbekistan | Princess Sumaya Hall, Amman |
| 21 September 2021; 11:00 | | (16–15) | | Princess Sumaya Hall, Amman |

| 21 September 2021; 13:00 | Kazakhstan | 20–40 | South Korea | Princess Sumaya Hall, Amman; Referees: Marzieh, Hassanzadah (IRI) |
| 21 September 2021; 13:00 | Jumadilova 8 | (9–21) | Jo 8 | Princess Sumaya Hall, Amman; Referees: Marzieh, Hassanzadah (IRI) |
| 21 September 2021; 13:00 | 10× (yellow card) 1× (suspension) | Report | 1× (yellow card) 3× (suspension) 1× (red card) | Princess Sumaya Hall, Amman; Referees: Marzieh, Hassanzadah (IRI) |

=== Group B ===
| Pos | Team | Pld | W | D | L | GF | GA | GD | Pts | Qualification |
|---|---|---|---|---|---|---|---|---|---|---|
| 1 | Japan | 5 | 5 | 0 | 0 | 217 | 41 | +176 | 10 | Semifinals |
| 2 | Iran | 5 | 4 | 0 | 1 | 176 | 84 | +92 | 8 | Semifinals |
| 3 | Jordan (H) | 5 | 3 | 0 | 2 | 131 | 113 | +18 | 6 | 5–8th place semifinals |
| 4 | Syria | 5 | 2 | 0 | 3 | 129 | 150 | −21 | 4 | 5–8th place semifinals |
| 5 | Kuwait | 5 | 1 | 0 | 4 | 83 | 170 | −87 | 2 | 9th place game |
| 6 | Palestine | 5 | 0 | 0 | 5 | 50 | 228 | −178 | 0 | Eleventh place |

Rules for classification: 1) points; 2) head-to-head points; 3) head-to-head goal difference; 4) head-to-head number of goals scored; 5) goal difference.
(H) Hosts

| 15 September 2021; 15:00 | Japan | 23–20 | Iran | Princess Sumaya Hall, Amman |
| 15 September 2021; 15:00 | | (14–8) | | Princess Sumaya Hall, Amman |

| 15 September 2021; 17:00 | Palestine | 7–45 | Jordan | Princess Sumaya Hall, Amman |
| 15 September 2021; 17:00 | | (2–23) | | Princess Sumaya Hall, Amman |

| 15 September 2021; 19:00 | Kuwait | 28–32 | Syria | Princess Sumaya Hall, Amman |
| 15 September 2021; 19:00 | | (13–16) | | Princess Sumaya Hall, Amman |

| 16 September 2021; 15:00 | Iran | 38–11 | Kuwait | Princess Sumaya Hall, Amman |
| 16 September 2021; 15:00 | | (21–5) | | Princess Sumaya Hall, Amman |

| 16 September 2021; 17:00 | Jordan | 28–24 | Syria | Princess Sumaya Hall, Amman |
| 16 September 2021; 17:00 | | (12–12) | | Princess Sumaya Hall, Amman |

| 16 September 2021; 19:00 | Japan | 56–1 | Palestine | Princess Sumaya Hall, Amman |
| 16 September 2021; 19:00 | | (29–0) | | Princess Sumaya Hall, Amman |

| 18 September 2021; 11:00 | Iran | 52–9 | Palestine | Princess Sumaya Hall, Amman |
| 18 September 2021; 11:00 | | (23–3) | | Princess Sumaya Hall, Amman |

| 18 September 2021; 13:00 | Syria | 7–42 | Japan | Princess Sumaya Hall, Amman |
| 18 September 2021; 13:00 | | (2–22) | | Princess Sumaya Hall, Amman |

| 18 September 2021; 17:00 | Jordan | 28–11 | Kuwait | Princess Sumaya Hall, Amman |
| 18 September 2021; 17:00 | | (17–5) | | Princess Sumaya Hall, Amman |

| 19 September 2021; 11:00 | Palestine | 13–47 | Syria | Princess Sumaya Hall, Amman |
| 19 September 2021; 11:00 | | (5–27) | | Princess Sumaya Hall, Amman |

| 19 September 2021; 15:00 | Kuwait | 5–52 | Japan | Princess Sumaya Hall, Amman |
| 19 September 2021; 15:00 | | (2–26) | | Princess Sumaya Hall, Amman |

| 19 September 2021; 17:00 | Iran | 28–22 | Jordan | Princess Sumaya Hall, Amman |
| 19 September 2021; 17:00 | | (15–12) | | Princess Sumaya Hall, Amman |

| 21 September 2021; 15:00 | Syria | 19–38 | Iran | Princess Sumaya Hall, Amman |
| 21 September 2021; 15:00 | | (10–20) | | Princess Sumaya Hall, Amman |

| 21 September 2021; 17:00 | Jordan | 8–43 | Japan | Princess Sumaya Hall, Amman |
| 21 September 2021; 17:00 | | (4–23) | | Princess Sumaya Hall, Amman |

| 21 September 2021; 19:00 | Kuwait | 28–20 | Palestine | Princess Sumaya Hall, Amman |
| 21 September 2021; 19:00 | | (16–10) | | Princess Sumaya Hall, Amman |

== Knockout stage ==
=== Bracket ===
Semi-finals
23 September
South Korea | 46
Iran | 21
23 September
Japan | 38
Kazakhstan | 24

Final
25 September
South Korea | 33
Japan | 24
Third place
25 September
Iran | 33
Kazakhstan | 38

5–8th place bracket

5–8th place semifinals
23 September
Uzbekistan | 34
Jordan | 26
23 September
Syria | 24
Hong Kong | 34

Fifth place
25 September
Uzbekistan | 28
Hong Kong | 25
Seventh place
25 September
Jordan | 22
Syria | 21

=== Ninth place game ===
| 23 September 2021; 11:00 | Singapore | 24–15 | Kuwait | Princess Sumaya Hall, Amman |
| 23 September 2021; 11:00 | | (12–6) | | Princess Sumaya Hall, Amman |

=== 5–8th place semifinals ===
| 23 September 2021; 13:00 | Uzbekistan | 34–26 | Jordan | Princess Sumaya Hall, Amman |
| 23 September 2021; 13:00 | | (15–11) | | Princess Sumaya Hall, Amman |

| 23 September 2021; 15:00 | Syria | 24–34 | Hong Kong | Princess Sumaya Hall, Amman |
| 23 September 2021; 15:00 | | (10–19) | | Princess Sumaya Hall, Amman |

=== Semifinals ===
| 23 September 2021; 17:00 | South Korea | 46–21 | Iran | Princess Sumaya Hall, Amman; Referees: Khasan, Khusan (UZB) |
| 23 September 2021; 17:00 | Song 8 | (23–12) | Ghahremani 6 | Princess Sumaya Hall, Amman; Referees: Khasan, Khusan (UZB) |
| 23 September 2021; 17:00 | 3× (suspension) | Report | 4× (suspension) 1× (red card) | Princess Sumaya Hall, Amman; Referees: Khasan, Khusan (UZB) |

| 23 September 2021; 19:00 | Japan | 38–24 | Kazakhstan | Princess Sumaya Hall, Amman |
| 23 September 2021; 19:00 | | (18–16) | | Princess Sumaya Hall, Amman |

=== Seventh place game ===
| 25 September 2021; 13:00 | Jordan | 22–21 | Syria | Princess Sumaya Hall, Amman |
| 25 September 2021; 13:00 | | (6–13) | | Princess Sumaya Hall, Amman |

=== Fifth place game ===
| 25 September 2021; 15:00 | Uzbekistan | 28–25 | Hong Kong | Princess Sumaya Hall, Amman |
| 25 September 2021; 15:00 | | (11–11) | | Princess Sumaya Hall, Amman |

=== Third place game ===
| 25 September 2021; 17:00 | Iran | 33–38 | Kazakhstan | Princess Sumaya Hall, Amman |
| 25 September 2021; 17:00 | | (15–20) | | Princess Sumaya Hall, Amman |

=== Final ===
| 25 September 2021; 19:00 | South Korea | 33–24 | Japan | Princess Sumaya Hall, Amman; Referees: Hussein, Imran (IRQ) |
| 25 September 2021; 19:00 | Jung 11 | (18–14) | Takamiya 6 | Princess Sumaya Hall, Amman; Referees: Hussein, Imran (IRQ) |
| 25 September 2021; 19:00 | 2× (suspension) | Report | 1× (suspension) | Princess Sumaya Hall, Amman; Referees: Hussein, Imran (IRQ) |

== Final standing ==
| Rank | Team |
|---|---|
| 1st place, gold medalist(s) | South Korea |
| 2nd place, silver medalist(s) | Japan |
| 3rd place, bronze medalist(s) | Kazakhstan |
| 4 | Iran |
| 5 | Uzbekistan |
| 6 | Hong Kong |
| 7 | Jordan |
| 8 | Syria |
| 9 | Singapore |
| 10 | Kuwait |
| 11 | Palestine |

| Qualified for the 2021 World Women's Handball Championship |

2021 Women's Asian Champions

South Korea
15th title

Team roster: Oh Sa-ra, Kim Seon-hwa, Song Ji-young, Shin Eun-joo, Song Hye-soo, Jeong Jin-hui, Yun Ye-jin, Kim Ji-hyun, Jo Ha-rang, Lee Mi-gyeong, Kim So-ra, Jung Yu-ra, Woo Bit-na, Kim Jin-yi, Jung Ji-in, Park Jun-hee
