= West Asian Women's Handball Championship =

Women's handball championship

- Sport: Handball
- Founded: 2016
- First season: 2016
- Owner: Asian Handball Federation
- Continent: Western Asia
- Most recent champion: India (1st title)
- Most titles: India & Iran & Qatar (1 title each)

The West Asian Women's Handball Championship or AHF Women's President Cup since 2023, is the official competition organised by the Asian Handball Federation for senior women's national handball teams of Western Asia.

== Summary ==
Year	Host	Final			Third place match		
Year	Host	Champion	Score	Runner-up	Third place	Score	Fourth place
2016; Details	(Qatar); Doha	Qatar	No playoffs	Jordan	Iraq	No playoffs	United Arab Emirates
2017; Details	(Jordan); Amman	Iran	No playoffs	Jordan	Syria	No playoffs	Qatar
2019; Details	(Lebanon); Beirut	Cancelled due to insufficient number of teams					
2023; Details	(Jordan); Amman	India	No playoffs	Jordan	Iraq	No playoffs	Kuwait

^1 Played in February 2018 ^2 Cancelled due to insufficient number of teams

== Medal table ==
Rank	Nation	Gold	Silver	Bronze	Total
1	India	1	0	0	1
1	Iran	1	0	0	1
1	Qatar	1	0	0	1
4	Jordan	0	3	0	3
5	Iraq	0	0	2	2
6	Syria	0	0	1	1
Totals (6 entries)		3	3	3	9

== Participating nations ==
Nation	(Qatar) 2016	(Jordan) 2017	(Jordan) 2023	Years
Iran		1st		1
Iraq	3rd	6th	3rd	3
Jordan	2nd	2nd	1st	2
Kuwait			4th	1
Lebanon		5th		1
Qatar	1st	4th		2
Syria		3rd		1
United Arab Emirates	4th			1
Guest Teams
India			1st	1
Total	4	6	4	
