= Handball at the 2023 Arab Games =

- Venue: Miloud Hadefi Complex Omnisport Arena; Hamou Boutlélis Sports Palace
- Location: Oran, Algeria
- Dates: 6–14 July

At the 2023 Arab Games, the Handball events were held at Miloud Hadefi Complex Omnisport Arena and Hamou Boutlélis Sports Palace in Oran, Algeria from 6 to 14 July. In this tournament, 5 teams played in men's competition only.

== Handball Medal table ==
* Host nation (Algeria)

2023 Handball Arab Games medal table
Rank	NOC	Gold	Silver	Bronze	Total
1	Qatar (QAT)	1	0	0	1
2	Saudi Arabia (KSA)	0	1	0	1
3	Algeria (ALG)*	0	0	1	1
4	Iraq (IRQ)	0	0	0	0
4	Jordan (JOR)	0	0	0	0
Totals (5 entries)		1	1	1	3

== Results ==
Date	Team 1	Score	Team 2
Day 1; 6 July	Iraq	25–32	Saudi Arabia
Day 1; 6 July	Jordan	22–39	Algeria
Day 2; 7 July	Saudi Arabia	28–18	Jordan
Day 2; 7 July	Algeria	28–27	Qatar
Day 3; 8 July	Qatar	36–21	Jordan
Day 3; 8 July	Algeria	21–21	Iraq
Day 4; 10 July	Jordan	21–32	Iraq
Day 4; 10 July	Saudi Arabia	22–23	Qatar
Day 5; 11 July	Algeria	15–22	Saudi Arabia
Day 5; 11 July	Qatar	24–21	Iraq
Semi finals 12 July	Qatar	24–23	Iraq
Semi finals 12 July	Algeria	19–20	Saudi Arabia
Finals; 14 July	Iraq	29–31	Algeria
Finals; 14 July	Qatar	38–24	Saudi Arabia
