= Iraqi Men's Handball League =

- Current season, competition or edition: 2025–26 Iraqi Handball Elite League
- Sport: Handball
- First season: 1978; 48 years ago
- Administrator: Iraqi Handball Federation
- No. of teams: 10 teams
- Country: Iraq
- Confederation: AHF
- Continent: Asia
- Most recent champion: Al Hashd Al Shaabi SC (2nd titles) (2025–26)
- Most titles: Al Jaish SC / Al-Karkh SC (12 titles)
- Level on pyramid: Level 1
- Relegation to: National 2
- Domestic cups: Iraqi Cup; Iraqi Super Cup
- International cups: AHF Asian Club Championship; Arab Clubs Championship

The Iraqi Handball Elite League ( Arabic : الدوري العراقي للنخبة لكرة اليد ) is the highest level of men's Handball in Iraq and it is organized by the Iraqi Handball Federation. Iraqi Handball Elite League is currently contested by 10 clubs around the country as of the last season 2025–26.

The regular season is played by 10 teams, playing each other twice, once at home and once away from home. After that the final Champion is defined by the team with the most points in the ranking table, the last placed two teams were automatically relegated to the second division.

== Titles by club ==
Rank	Club	Titles
1	Al Jaish SC	12
1	Al-Karkh SC	12
3	Al-Shorta SC	7
4	Al-Rasheed SC	6
5	Al-Talaba SC	4
6	Al Hashd Al Shaabi SC	2
6	Naft Al-Janoub SC	2
8	Sulaymaniyah SC	1
8	Diyala SC	1
8	Al-Bahri SC	1

== Winners List ==
Season	Champion
2025–26	Al Hashd Al Shaabi SC
2024–25	Al Hashd Al Shaabi SC
2023–24	Al-Karkh SC
2022–23	Al-Shorta SC
2021–22	Al-Shorta SC
2020–21	Al Jaish SC
2019–20	Al-Shorta SC
2018–19	Al-Shorta SC
2017–18	Al-Shorta SC
2016–17	Al-Shorta SC
2015–16	Al-Shorta SC
2014–15	Naft Al-Janoub SC
2013–14	Naft Al-Janoub SC
2012–13	Al Jaish SC
2011–12	Al Jaish SC

Season	Champion
2010–11	Al-Karkh SC
2009–10	Al Jaish SC
2008–09	Al Jaish SC
2007	Al Jaish SC
2006	Sulaymaniyah SC
2005–06	Al-Karkh SC
2004–05	Al-Karkh SC
2003–04	Al Jaish SC
2002–03	Al Jaish SC
2001–02	Al Jaish SC
2000–01	Al-Karkh SC
1999–2000	Al-Karkh SC
1998–99	Diyala SC
1997–98	Al-Karkh SC
1996–97	Al-Karkh SC
1995–96	Al-Karkh SC
1994–95	Al-Karkh SC

Season	Champion
1993–94	Al-Talaba SC
1992–93	Al-Karkh SC
1991–92	Al-Karkh SC
1990–91	Al-Rasheed SC
1989–90	Al-Rasheed SC
1988–89	Al-Rasheed SC
1987–88	Al-Rasheed SC
1986–87	Al-Rasheed SC
1985–86	Al-Rasheed SC
1984–85	Al Jaish SC
1984	Al Jaish SC
1983	Al-Bahri SC
1982	Al Jaish SC
1981	Al-Talaba SC
1980	Not held
1979	Al-Talaba SC
1978	Al-Talaba SC

Sources :
