= Jo Ha-rang =

South Korean handball player (born 1991)

Personal information
- Nationality: South Korean
- Born: 15 July 1991 (age 35)
- Height: 1.65 m (5 ft 5 in)

Sport
- Sport: Handball
- Position: Left wing
- Current club: Gwangju City
National team
- Years: Team
- –: South Korea
Medal record
Asian Championship
Gold medal – first place	2018 Japan
Gold medal – first place	2021 Jordan

Jo Ha-rang (born 15 July 1991) is a South Korean handball player for Gwangju City and the South Korean national team.

She participated at the 2017 World Women's Handball Championship.
