= Islamic Republic of Iran Handball Federation =

Major handball organization in Iran

Islamic Republic of Iran Handball Federation فدراسیون هندبال جمهوری اسلامی ایران (Persian) IRIHF
- IOC nation: IRI
- Sport: Handball
- Other sports: Beach handball
- Official website: irhf.ir

HISTORY
- Year of formation: 1975 at Tehran (Imperial State of Iran)

AFFILIATIONS
- International federation: International Handball Federation (IHF)
- IHF member since: 1978
- Continental association: Asian Handball Federation
- National Olympic Committee: National Olympic Committee of the Islamic Republic of Iran
- Other affiliation(s): West Asian Handball Federation; Ministry of Youth Affairs and Sports; National Olympic Academy of Iran

GOVERNING BODY
- President: Alireza Pakdel (Iran)

HEADQUARTERS
- Address: Enghelab Sport Complex, Tehran
- Country: Islamic Republic of Iran
- Secretary General: Mr. Mohammad Reza Rajabi

The Islamic Republic of Iran Handball Federation (IRIHF) is the governing body for Handball in Iran. It was founded in 1975, and has been a member of IHF since 1978. It is also a member of the Asian Handball Federation. The IRIHF is responsible for organizing the Iran men's national handball team and Iran women's national handball team.

== IRIHF Presidents ==
1. Amir Amin
2. Haroun Mahdavi
3. Mahmoud Mashhoun
4. Amir Hosseini
5. Mahmoud Mashhoun
6. Mohammad Hamzeh Alipour
7. Salimi
8. Ali Mohammad Amirtash
9. Alireza Rahimi (1994 - 2010)
10. Jalal Kouzehgari (2010 - 2017)
11. Alireza Rahimi (2017 - 2019)
12. Alireza Pakdel (2019–Present)

== Competitions hosted ==
- 2020 Asian Men's Junior Handball Championship
- 2014 Asian Men's Junior Handball Championship
- 2010 Asian Men's Junior Handball Championship
- 2008 Asian Men's Handball Championship
- 2007 Asian Beach Handball Championship
- 2006 Asian Men's Youth Handball Championship
- 2004 Asian Men's Club League Handball Championship
- 2002 Asian Men's Handball Championship
- 2001 Asian Men's Club League Handball Championship
- 2000 Asian Men's Junior Handball Championship
- 1999 Asian Men's Club League Handball Championship
- 1990 Asian Men's Junior Handball Championship
