= Alireza Rahimi (footballer) =

Iranian football administrator (born 1952)

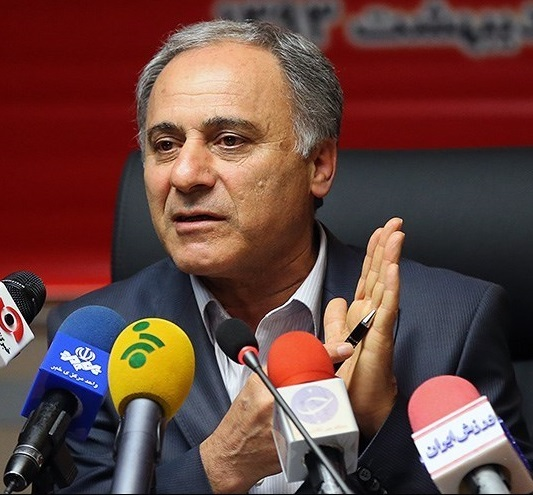

Vice-President of Asian Handball Federation
- Incumbent
- Assumed office 10 November 2017 Serving with Ahmed Mohamed Al-Shaabi (Qatar); Abdullah Ashour (Lebanon); Ali Mohamed Isa Eshaqi (Bahrain)
- President: His Highness Sheikh Ahmed Al-Fahad Al-Ahmed Al-Sabah (Kuwait)

8th President of Islamic Republic of Iran Handball Federation
- In office 2017–2019
- Preceded by: Jalal Kouzehgari
- Succeeded by: Alireza Pakdel
- In office 1994–2010
- Preceded by: Ali Mohammad Amirtash
- Succeeded by: Jalal Kouzehgari
Alireza Rahimi
Personal information
- Date of birth: 22 January 1952 (age 74)
- Place of birth: Isfahan, Iran
- Position: Forward
Youth career
- 1969–1973: Sepahan
Senior career*
Years	Team	Apps	(Gls)
1973–1985	Sepahan		
- * Club domestic league appearances and goals

Alireza Rahimi (Persian: علیرضا رحیمی; born 22 January 1952) is the current vice-president of Asian Handball Federation since 2017 and former president of the Islamic Republic of Iran Handball Federation 2017 to 2019. He was previously the president of three sport clubs including Persepolis Athletic and Cultural Club, Sepahan F.C. based in Isfahan, Iran and Rah Ahan FC. He was a board member of the Islamic Republic of Iran Football Federation and also was the chairman of the Islamic Republic of Iran Handball Federation from 1994 to 2010. He is also a former player of Sepahan.
