= Tansholpan Jumadilova =

Kazakhstani handball player

Personal information
- Nationality: Kazakhstani
- Born: 18 July 1998 (age 28)
- Height: 1.65 m (5 ft 5 in)

Sport
- Sport: Handball
- Position: Pivot
- Current club: Kazygurt Handball
National team
Years	Team	Apps	(Gls)
–	Kazakhstan	47	(123)
Medal record
Asian Championship
Bronze medal – third place	2021 Jordan

Tansholpan Jumadilova (born 18 July 1998) is a Kazakhstani handball player for Kazygurt Handball and the Kazakhstani national team.

She represented Kazakhstan at the 2019 World Women's Handball Championship.
