= 2018 Asian Men's Youth Handball Championship =

2018 handball championship in Asia

- Logo of 8th Asian Men's Youth (U-19) Handball Championship

Tournament details
- Host country: Jordan
- Venue: 1 (in 1 host city)
- Dates: 16–26 September
- Teams: 14 (from 1 confederation)

Final positions
- Champions: Bahrain (2nd title)
- Runners-up: Japan
- Third place: Chinese Taipei
- Fourth place: Saudi Arabia

Tournament statistics
- Matches played: 42
- Top scorer(s): (Qatar) Ahmed Al-Kharusi (71 goals)

Awards
- Best player: (Qatar) Ahmed Al-Kharusi

The 2018 Asian Men's Youth Handball Championship was the 8th edition of the championship held from 16 to 26 September 2018 at Amman (Jordan) under the aegis of Asian Handball Federation. It was the third time in history that championship was organised in Jordan by the Jordan Handball Federation. The top four teams qualified for the 2019 Men's Youth World Handball Championship to be held in Republic of Macedonia.

== Draw ==
The draw was held on 28 April 2018 in Amman, Jordan.

Teams were seeded according to the AHF Competition regulations and rankings of the previous edition of the championship. Teams who had not participate in the previous edition were in Pot 4.

Pot 1	Pot 2	Pot 3	Pot 4
Bahrain; Japan; South Korea; Jordan	Qatar; Saudi Arabia; Iraq; ~~Uzbekistan~~	China	Iran; India; Chinese Taipei; United Arab Emirates; Oman; ~~Palestine~~; Syria

Uzbekistan and Palestine withdrew from the tournament after the draw.

== Preliminary round ==
All times are local (UTC+3).

=== Group A ===
Pos	Team	Pld	W	D	L	GF	GA	GD	Pts	Qualification
1	Bahrain	3	3	0	0	95	62	+33	6	Main round
2	Saudi Arabia	3	2	0	1	95	75	+20	4	Main round
3	China	3	1	0	2	69	94	−25	2	8–12th placement
4	Oman	3	0	0	3	67	95	−28	0	8–12th placement

Rules for classification: 1) Points; 2) Head-to-head points; 3) Head-to-head goal difference; 4) Head-to-head goals scored; 5) Goal difference; 6) Goals scored; 7) Draw.

16 September 2018; 13:30	China	22–35	Saudi Arabia	Princess Sumaya Hall, Amman; Referees: Sadeghi, Kolahdouzan (IRI)
16 September 2018; 13:30	Chen 7	(8–19)	Al-Qasir 7	Princess Sumaya Hall, Amman; Referees: Sadeghi, Kolahdouzan (IRI)

16 September 2018; 15:15	Oman	17–33	Bahrain	Princess Sumaya Hall, Amman; Referees: El-Awwad, Al-Zayyat (JOR)
16 September 2018; 15:15	Al-Balushi, Al-Najadi 4	(9–17)	Afrooz, Qambar 5	Princess Sumaya Hall, Amman; Referees: El-Awwad, Al-Zayyat (JOR)

17 September 2018; 11:45	China	21–34	Bahrain	Princess Sumaya Hall, Amman; Referees: Lee, Lee (KOR)
17 September 2018; 11:45	Xie 5	(11–15)	Shuaib 6	Princess Sumaya Hall, Amman; Referees: Lee, Lee (KOR)

17 September 2018; 13:30	Oman	25–36	Saudi Arabia	Princess Sumaya Hall, Amman; Referees: Imran, Hussein (IRQ)
17 September 2018; 13:30	Al-Khalasi 7	(13–21)	Al-Khulayf 9	Princess Sumaya Hall, Amman; Referees: Imran, Hussein (IRQ)

18 September 2018; 10:00	China	26–25	Oman	Princess Sumaya Hall, Amman; Referees: El-Haj, Etoom (JOR)
18 September 2018; 10:00	Rao 7	(10–12)	S. Al-Hasani 9	Princess Sumaya Hall, Amman; Referees: El-Haj, Etoom (JOR)

18 September 2018; 11:45	Bahrain	28–24	Saudi Arabia	Princess Sumaya Hall, Amman; Referees: Al-Zayyat, El-Awwad (JOR)
18 September 2018; 11:45	Qambar 6	(18–8)	Obaed 5	Princess Sumaya Hall, Amman; Referees: Al-Zayyat, El-Awwad (JOR)

=== Group B ===
Pos	Team	Pld	W	D	L	GF	GA	GD	Pts	Qualification
1	Chinese Taipei	2	2	0	0	70	45	+25	4	Main round
2	Jordan (H)	2	1	0	1	46	55	−9	2	Main round
3	Syria	2	0	0	2	54	70	−16	0	8–12th placement

Rules for classification: 1) Points; 2) Head-to-head points; 3) Head-to-head goal difference; 4) Head-to-head goals scored; 5) Goal difference; 6) Goals scored; 7) Draw.
(H) Hosts

16 September 2018; 17:00	Syria	26–29	Jordan	Princess Sumaya Hall, Amman; Referees: Al-Shamrookh, Jawad (BHR)
16 September 2018; 17:00	Al-Mulla 5	(10–13)	Yacoub 9	Princess Sumaya Hall, Amman; Referees: Al-Shamrookh, Jawad (BHR)

17 September 2018; 17:00	Chinese Taipei	41–28	Syria	Princess Sumaya Hall, Amman; Referees: Al-Kuaibi, Malaekah (KSA)
17 September 2018; 17:00	Lin 6	(18–11)	Al-Mulla 8	Princess Sumaya Hall, Amman; Referees: Al-Kuaibi, Malaekah (KSA)

18 September 2018; 17:00	Jordan	17–29	Chinese Taipei	Princess Sumaya Hall, Amman; Referees: Ota, Shimajiri (JPN)
18 September 2018; 17:00	Al-Dibis 5	(6–16)	Lin 11	Princess Sumaya Hall, Amman; Referees: Ota, Shimajiri (JPN)

=== Group C ===
Pos	Team	Pld	W	D	L	GF	GA	GD	Pts	Qualification
1	India	2	0	0	2	56	77	−21	0	Main round
	South Korea (D)	1	1	0	0	45	30	+15	2	Disqualified
	Iraq (D)	1	1	0	0	32	26	+6	2	Disqualified

Rules for classification: 1) Points; 2) Head-to-head points; 3) Head-to-head goal difference; 4) Head-to-head goals scored; 5) Goal difference; 6) Goals scored; 7) Draw.
(D) Disqualified

16 September 2018; 11:45	India	30–45	South Korea	Princess Sumaya Hall, Amman; Referees: El-Haj, Etoom (JOR)
16 September 2018; 11:45	Amit 9	(11–22)	Im 9	Princess Sumaya Hall, Amman; Referees: El-Haj, Etoom (JOR)

17 September 2018; 10:00	Iraq	32–26	India	Princess Sumaya Hall, Amman; Referees: Ota, Shimajiri (JPN)
17 September 2018; 10:00	three players 6	(15–11)	Mohit 9	Princess Sumaya Hall, Amman; Referees: Ota, Shimajiri (JPN)

18 September 2018; 13:30	South Korea	Abandoned	Iraq	Princess Sumaya Hall, Amman

=== Group D ===
Pos	Team	Pld	W	D	L	GF	GA	GD	Pts	Qualification
1	Iran	3	3	0	0	81	73	+8	6	Main round
2	Japan	3	1	1	1	93	80	+13	3	Main round
3	Qatar	3	1	1	1	91	88	+3	3	8–12th placement
4	United Arab Emirates	3	0	0	3	71	95	−24	0	8–12th placement

Rules for classification: 1) Points; 2) Head-to-head points; 3) Head-to-head goal difference; 4) Head-to-head goals scored; 5) Goal difference; 6) Goals scored; 7) Draw.

16 September 2018; 10:00	Iran	29–28	Japan	Princess Sumaya Hall, Amman; Referees: Al-Wahibi, Al-Shahi (OMA)
16 September 2018; 10:00	Asari 8	(17–15)	Taiga 8	Princess Sumaya Hall, Amman; Referees: Al-Wahibi, Al-Shahi (OMA)

16 September 2018; 18:45	United Arab Emirates	31–35	Qatar	Princess Sumaya Hall, Amman; Referees: Hussein, Imran (IRQ)
16 September 2018; 18:45	Abdelqadir 11	(17–17)	Al-Kharusi 13	Princess Sumaya Hall, Amman; Referees: Hussein, Imran (IRQ)

17 September 2018; 15:15	Iran	26–25	Qatar	Princess Sumaya Hall, Amman; Referees: Al-Zayyat, El-Awwad (JOR)
17 September 2018; 15:15	Asari 8	(12–8)	Al-Kharusi 11	Princess Sumaya Hall, Amman; Referees: Al-Zayyat, El-Awwad (JOR)

17 September 2018; 18:45	United Arab Emirates	20–34	Japan	Princess Sumaya Hall, Amman; Referees: Sadeghi, Kolahdouzan (IRI)
17 September 2018; 18:45	Abdelqadir, Al-Shurafa 4	(14–15)	Taiga 7	Princess Sumaya Hall, Amman; Referees: Sadeghi, Kolahdouzan (IRI)

18 September 2018; 15:15	United Arab Emirates	20–26	Iran	Princess Sumaya Hall, Amman; Referees: Al-Wahibi, Al-Shahi (OMA)
18 September 2018; 15:15	Abdelqadir 11	(8–14)	Asari 7	Princess Sumaya Hall, Amman; Referees: Al-Wahibi, Al-Shahi (OMA)

18 September 2018; 18:45	Japan	31–31	Qatar	Princess Sumaya Hall, Amman; Referees: Sadeghi, Kolahdouzan (IRI)
18 September 2018; 18:45	Taiga 8	(16–15)	Mohamed 10	Princess Sumaya Hall, Amman; Referees: Sadeghi, Kolahdouzan (IRI)

== 8–12th placement matches ==
=== Group III ===
Pos	Team	Pld	W	D	L	GF	GA	GD	Pts
8	China	4	3	0	1	114	98	+16	6 (Note: China 29–26 Qatar)
9	Qatar	4	3	0	1	111	106	+5	6
10	United Arab Emirates	4	2	0	2	108	111	−3	4 (Note: Oman 26–28 United Arab Emirates)
11	Oman	4	2	0	2	109	106	+3	4
12	Syria	3	0	0	3	99	120	−21	0

Source: AHF
Rules for classification: 1) Points; 2) Head-to-head points; 3) Head-to-head goal difference; 4) Head-to-head goals scored; 5) Goal difference; 6) Goals scored; 7) Draw.
Notes:

20 September 2018; 10:00	Syria	25–30	Oman	Princess Sumaya Hall, Amman; Referees: Lee, Lee (KOR)
20 September 2018; 10:00	Al-Mulla 6	(14–14)	Al-Bulushi, N. Al-Hasani 6	Princess Sumaya Hall, Amman; Referees: Lee, Lee (KOR)

20 September 2018; 11:45	China	30–25	United Arab Emirates	Princess Sumaya Hall, Amman; Referees: Al-Shamrookh, Jawad (BHR)
20 September 2018; 11:45	Xie 9	(14–16)	Abdelqadir 8	Princess Sumaya Hall, Amman; Referees: Al-Shamrookh, Jawad (BHR)

21 September 2018; 09:00	Oman	25–24	China	Princess Sumaya Hall, Amman; Referees: Ota, Shimajiri (JPN)
21 September 2018; 09:00	S. Al-Hasani 6	(10–13)	Rao 6	Princess Sumaya Hall, Amman; Referees: Ota, Shimajiri (JPN)

21 September 2018; 10:45	Qatar	27–25	United Arab Emirates	Princess Sumaya Hall, Amman; Referees: Al-Wahibi, Al-Shahi (OMA)
21 September 2018; 10:45	Mohamed 6	(12–12)	Abdelqadir, Al-Ghfeli 5	Princess Sumaya Hall, Amman; Referees: Al-Wahibi, Al-Shahi (OMA)

22 September 2018; 10:00	China	29–26	Qatar	Princess Sumaya Hall, Amman; Referees: Lee, Lee (KOR)
22 September 2018; 10:00	Zhang 9	(20–11)	Al-Kharusi 13	Princess Sumaya Hall, Amman; Referees: Lee, Lee (KOR)

22 September 2018; 11:45	United Arab Emirates	30–28	Syria	Princess Sumaya Hall, Amman; Referees: Al-Kuaibi, Malaekah (KSA)
22 September 2018; 11:45	Al-Maazmi 7	(16–13)	Al-Hosin 6	Princess Sumaya Hall, Amman; Referees: Al-Kuaibi, Malaekah (KSA)

24 September 2018; 10:00	Oman	26–28	United Arab Emirates	Princess Sumaya Hall, Amman; Referees: Ota, Shimajiri (JPN)
24 September 2018; 10:00	S. Al-Hasani 14	(12–15)	Al-Hosani 7	Princess Sumaya Hall, Amman; Referees: Ota, Shimajiri (JPN)

24 September 2018; 11:45	Qatar	29–24	Syria	Princess Sumaya Hall, Amman; Referees: Al-Wahibi, Al-Shahi (OMA)
24 September 2018; 11:45	Khelifi 8	(13–11)	five players 4	Princess Sumaya Hall, Amman; Referees: Al-Wahibi, Al-Shahi (OMA)

25 September 2018; 10:00	Qatar	29–28	Oman	Princess Sumaya Hall, Amman; Referees: El-Haj, Etoom (JOR)
25 September 2018; 10:00	Al-Kharusi 15	(15–15)	N. Al-Hasani, S. Al-Hasani 8	Princess Sumaya Hall, Amman; Referees: El-Haj, Etoom (JOR)

25 September 2018; 11:45	China	31–22	Syria	Princess Sumaya Hall, Amman; Referees: Al-Kuaibi, Malaekah (KSA)
25 September 2018; 11:45	Rao 12	(18–10)	Al-Mulla 7	Princess Sumaya Hall, Amman; Referees: Al-Kuaibi, Malaekah (KSA)

== Main round ==
=== Group I ===
Pos	Team	Pld	W	D	L	GF	GA	GD	Pts	Qualification
1	Bahrain	3	3	0	0	93	74	+19	6	Semifinals
2	Japan	3	2	0	1	97	58	+39	4	Semifinals
3	India	3	1	0	2	67	99	−32	2	5th place game
4	Jordan (H)	3	0	0	3	69	95	−26	0	

Source: AHF
Rules for classification: 1) Points; 2) Head-to-head points; 3) Head-to-head goal difference; 4) Head-to-head goals scored; 5) Goal difference; 6) Goals scored; 7) Draw.
(H) Hosts

20 September 2018; 13:30	Jordan	26–28	India	Princess Sumaya Hall, Amman; Referees: Al-Kuaibi, Malaekah (KSA)
20 September 2018; 13:30	Al-Atabi 6	(10–14)	Mohit, Singh 8	Princess Sumaya Hall, Amman; Referees: Al-Kuaibi, Malaekah (KSA)

20 September 2018; 15:15	Bahrain	27–23	Japan	Princess Sumaya Hall, Amman; Referees: Al-Zayyat, El-Awwad (JOR)
20 September 2018; 15:15	Mohamed 10	(8–14)	Kosuke, Mizuki 5	Princess Sumaya Hall, Amman; Referees: Al-Zayyat, El-Awwad (JOR)

21 September 2018; 14:00	Bahrain	32–21	India	Princess Sumaya Hall, Amman; Referees: Lee, Lee (KOR)
21 September 2018; 14:00	Qambar 8	(16–7)	Mohit 12	Princess Sumaya Hall, Amman; Referees: Lee, Lee (KOR)

21 September 2018; 15:45	Jordan	13–33	Japan	Princess Sumaya Hall, Amman; Referees: Sadeghi, Kolahdouzan (IRI)
21 September 2018; 15:45	Al-Dibis 9	(7–15)	Shu, Shuichi 6	Princess Sumaya Hall, Amman; Referees: Sadeghi, Kolahdouzan (IRI)

22 September 2018; 13:30	Japan	41–18	India	Princess Sumaya Hall, Amman; Referees: Al-Shamrookh, Jawad (BHR)
22 September 2018; 13:30	Taiga 8	(20–12)	Amit 6	Princess Sumaya Hall, Amman; Referees: Al-Shamrookh, Jawad (BHR)

22 September 2018; 15:15	Jordan	30–34	Bahrain	Princess Sumaya Hall, Amman; Referees: Ota, Shimajiri (JPN)
22 September 2018; 15:15	Barakeh 6	(14–18)	Husain 8	Princess Sumaya Hall, Amman; Referees: Ota, Shimajiri (JPN)

=== Group II ===
Pos	Team	Pld	W	D	L	GF	GA	GD	Pts	Qualification
1	Saudi Arabia	2	1	1	0	60	54	+6	3	Semifinals
2	Chinese Taipei	2	1	0	1	57	60	−3	2	Semifinals
3	Iran	2	0	1	1	54	57	−3	1	5th place game

Source: AHF
Rules for classification: 1) Points; 2) Head-to-head points; 3) Head-to-head goal difference; 4) Head-to-head goals scored; 5) Goal difference; 6) Goals scored; 7) Draw.

20 September 2018; 17:00	Saudi Arabia	27–27	Iran	Princess Sumaya Hall, Amman; Referees: Imran, Hussein (IRQ)
20 September 2018; 17:00	Al-Turki 8	(13–16)	Asari 8	Princess Sumaya Hall, Amman; Referees: Imran, Hussein (IRQ)

21 September 2018; 17:30	Chinese Taipei	30–27	Iran	Princess Sumaya Hall, Amman; Referees: Al-Zayyat, El-Awwad (JOR)
21 September 2018; 17:30	Chen 8	(11–10)	Hosseini 7	Princess Sumaya Hall, Amman; Referees: Al-Zayyat, El-Awwad (JOR)

22 September 2018; 17:00	Chinese Taipei	27–33	Saudi Arabia	Princess Sumaya Hall, Amman; Referees: Imran, Hussein (IRQ)
22 September 2018; 17:00	four players 4	(17–16)	Ajlan 9	Princess Sumaya Hall, Amman; Referees: Imran, Hussein (IRQ)

== Knockout stage ==
=== Bracket ===
Semifinals
24 September
Bahrain	33
Chinese Taipei	25
24 September
Saudi Arabia	17
Japan	25

Final
26 September
Bahrain	34
Japan	31
Third place
26 September
Chinese Taipei	29
Saudi Arabia	26

=== Fifth place game ===
24 September 2018; 13:30	India	25–30	Iran	Princess Sumaya Hall, Amman; Referees: Lee, Lee (KOR)
24 September 2018; 13:30	Mohit, Singh 7	(14–17)	Asari 9	Princess Sumaya Hall, Amman; Referees: Lee, Lee (KOR)

=== Semifinals ===
24 September 2018; 15:30	Bahrain	33–25	Chinese Taipei	Princess Sumaya Hall, Amman; Referees: Al-Zayyat, El-Awwad (JOR)
24 September 2018; 15:30	Ali 10	(18–11)	Lin, Yao 5	Princess Sumaya Hall, Amman; Referees: Al-Zayyat, El-Awwad (JOR)

24 September 2018; 17:30	Saudi Arabia	17–25	Japan	Princess Sumaya Hall, Amman; Referees: Sadeghi, Kolahdouzan (IRI)
24 September 2018; 17:30	Al-Turki, Obaed 4	(7–11)	Taiga 6	Princess Sumaya Hall, Amman; Referees: Sadeghi, Kolahdouzan (IRI)

=== Third place game ===
26 September 2018; 16:00	Chinese Taipei	29–26	Saudi Arabia	Princess Sumaya Hall, Amman; Referees: Al-Wahibi, Al-Shahi (OMA)
26 September 2018; 16:00	Yang 9	(15–14)	Al-Khulayf, Obaed 6	Princess Sumaya Hall, Amman; Referees: Al-Wahibi, Al-Shahi (OMA)

=== Final ===
26 September 2018; 18:00	Bahrain	34–31	Japan	Princess Sumaya Hall, Amman; Referees: Sadeghi, Kolahdouzan (IRI)
26 September 2018; 18:00	Shuaib, Qambar 8	(17–16)	Shimizu 7	Princess Sumaya Hall, Amman; Referees: Sadeghi, Kolahdouzan (IRI)

== Final standings ==
Rank	Team
1st place, gold medalist(s)	Bahrain
2nd place, silver medalist(s)	Japan
3rd place, bronze medalist(s)	Chinese Taipei
4	Saudi Arabia
5	Iran
6	India
7	Jordan
8	China
9	Qatar
10	United Arab Emirates
11	Oman
12	Syria
DSQ	Iraq
DSQ	South Korea

Team qualified for the 2019 Youth World Championship
