= Oh Sa-ra =

South Korean handball player (born 1992)

Personal information
- Nationality: South Korean
- Born: 26 November 1992 (age 33)
- Height: 1.73 m (5 ft 8 in)

Sport
- Sport: Handball
- Position: Goalkeeper
- Current club: Busan
National team
Years	Team	Apps	(Gls)
–	South Korea	12	(3)
Medal record
Asian Championship
Gold medal – first place	2021 Jordan
Gold medal – first place	2022 South Korea
Silver medal – second place	2024 India

Oh Sa-ra (Korean: 오사라; born 26 November 1992) is a South Korean handball player for Busan and the South Korean national team.

She participated at the 2021 World Women's Handball Championship in Spain.
