= Fatemeh Khalili =

Iranian handball player (born 1996)

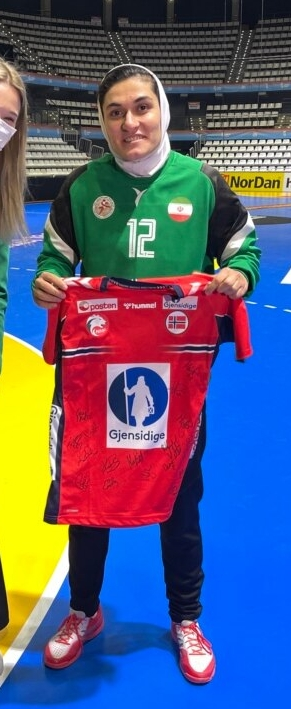

Personal information
- Full name: Fatemeh Khalili Behfar
- Nationality: Iranian
- Born: 30 June 1996 (age 30) Qom, Iran
- Height: 1.75 m (5 ft 9 in)

Sport
- Sport: Handball
- Position: Goalkeeper
- Current club: CSM Iași 2020
- Number: 12

Senior clubs
- Years: Team
- –2015: Hadaf Pooyan Javan
- 2015–2016: Naftogaz Gachsaran
- 2017–2018: Shahid Chamran
- 2019–2020: Eshtad Sazeh
- 2020–2021: Sepahan
- 2021–2022: Antalya Anadolu
- 2022–2023: Tekirdağ Süleymanpaşa
- 2023–: CSM Iași 2020
National team
Years	Team		
–	Iran U20		
–	Iran	47	(0)
- Updated on 27 November 2025

Fatemeh Khalili Behfar (Persian: فاطمه خلیلی بهفر; born 30 June 1996) is an Iranian professional handball player for CSM Iași 2020 and the Iranian national team. She has participated in five Asian senior championships so far.

== Women's World Handball Championship in 2021 ==
In the 2021 World Women's Handball Championship in Spain, in the second meeting of the Iranian women's national handball team, she was selected as the best player on the field against the Norwegian national team with 18 saves and made history.

Norway goalkeeper Silje Solberg said: "Fateme was incredibly impressive." One of the best performances I have seen on the handball field. I am proud of this goalkeeper and I am very impressed. She also played a great game against Romania.
