= Iraqi Handball Federation =

Governing body of handball in Iraq

Iraqi Handball Federation Arabic: الاتحاد العراقي لكرة اليد IHF
- IOC nation: Republic of Iraq (IRQ)
- Sport: Handball

HISTORY
- Year of formation: 1972; 53 years ago

AFFILIATIONS
- International federation: International Handball Federation (IHF)
- IHF member since: 1976
- Continental association: Asian Handball Federation
- National Olympic Committee: National Olympic Committee of Iraq
- Other affiliation(s): Arab Handball Federation

GOVERNING BODY
- President: Mohammed Hashem Al-Araji

HEADQUARTERS
- Address: Falastin Street, Baghdad
- Country: Iraq
- Secretary General: Yasir Qaddoori
- Vice-President: Ryadh Abdulridha
- Treasurer: Khalil Ibrahim

Iraqi Handball Federation

Medal record

Representing Iraq

Handball

Islamic Solidarity Games
Bronze medal – third place	2017 Baku	Team

The Iraqi Handball Federation (IHF) (Arabic: الاتحاد العراقي لكرة اليد) is the administrative and controlling body for handball in Republic of Iraq. Founded in 1972, IHF is a member of the Asian Handball Federation and member of the International Handball Federation since 1976.

== IHF Executive Committee ==
Following is the IHF Executive Committee for the term 2018 – 2022.

Designation	Name
President	Mohammed Hashem Al-Araji
Vice-President	Ryadh Abdulridha
Secretary General	Yasir Qaddoori
Treasurer	Khalil Ibrahim
Members	Rydha Aboodi
Members	Kameran Hassan
Members	Haitham Abdulsattar
Members	Mrs. Etibar Mouhammed

== Competitions hosted ==
HFI had hosted following international championships:

Championship	Venue
2028 Asian Men's Club League Handball Championship	Baghdad
2023 Asian Men's Club League Handball Championship	Baghdad

== National teams ==
- Iraq men's national handball team
- Iraq men's national junior handball team
- Iraq women's national handball team
