= Iran women's national handball team =

Iran

Information
- Nickname: Team Melli Zanan
- Association: IRIHF
- Coach: Ana Teixeira
- Assistant coach: Ana De Jesus; Nashmin Shafeyan

Colours
| 1st | 2nd |

Results

World Championship
- Appearances: 3 (First in 2021)
- Best result: 31st (2021, 2023)

Asian Championship
- Appearances: 9 (First in 2008)
- Best result: 4th (2021, 2022, 2024)
- Last updated on Unknown.

Iran women's national handball team
Medal record

West Asian Championship
| Gold medal – first place | 2017 Amman | |

Islamic Solidarity Games
| Bronze medal – third place | 2025 Riyadh | |

The Iran women's national handball team represents Iran in international handball competitions and is controlled by IR Iran Handball Federation.

== Tournament record ==
=== World Championship ===
| Tournament | Ranking | Pld | W | D | L | GS | GA | Dif |
|---|---|---|---|---|---|---|---|---|
| 1957–2019 | Did not enter | – | – | – | – | – | – | – |
| (Spain) 2021 | 31st | 7 | 1 | 0 | 6 | 112 | 221 | −109 |
| (Denmark) (Norway) (Sweden) 2023 | 31st | 7 | 1 | 0 | 6 | 144 | 240 | −96 |
| (Germany) (Netherlands) 2025 | 32nd | 7 | 0 | 0 | 7 | 107 | 233 | −126 |
| (Hungary) 2027 | To be determined | | | | | | | |
| (Spain) 2029 | To be determined | | | | | | | |
| (Czech Republic) (Poland) 2031 | To be determined | | | | | | | |
| Total | 3/27 | 21 | 2 | 0 | 19 | 363 | 684 | −331 |

=== Asian Championship ===
| Tournament | Ranking | Pld | W | D | L | GS | GA | Dif |
|---|---|---|---|---|---|---|---|---|
| 1987–2006 | Did not enter | – | – | – | – | – | – | – |
| (Thailand) 2008 | 7th | 5 | 2 | 0 | 3 | 116 | 187 | −71 |
| (Kazakhstan) 2010 | 8th | 4 | 0 | 0 | 4 | 72 | 158 | −86 |
| (Indonesia) 2012 | 9th | 7 | 3 | 0 | 4 | 206 | 170 | +36 |
| (Indonesia) 2015 | 6th | 5 | 2 | 0 | 3 | 104 | 173 | −69 |
| (South Korea) 2017 | 7th | 5 | 1 | 0 | 4 | 120 | 157 | −37 |
| (Japan) 2018 | 6th | 6 | 2 | 0 | 4 | 139 | 167 | −28 |
| (Jordan) 2021 | 4th | 7 | 4 | 0 | 3 | 230 | 168 | +62 |
| (South Korea) 2022 | 4th | 6 | 3 | 0 | 3 | 175 | 205 | −30 |
| (India) 2024 | 4th | 5 | 2 | 0 | 3 | 114 | 129 | −15 |
| (Kazakhstan) 2026 | qualified | | | | | | | |
| Total | 10/21 | 50 | 19 | 0 | 31 | 1276 | 1514 | −238 |

=== Asian Games ===
| Year | Ranking | Pld | W | D | L | GS | GA | Dif |
|---|---|---|---|---|---|---|---|---|
| 1990–2026 | Did not enter | | | | | | | |
| (Qatar) 2030 | Future events | | | | | | | |
| (Saudi Arabia) 2034 | Future events | | | | | | | |
| Total | – | – | – | – | – | – | – | – |

=== Islamic Solidarity Games ===
| Tournament | Ranking | Pld | W | D | L | GS | GA | Dif |
|---|---|---|---|---|---|---|---|---|
| (Azerbaijan) 2017 | Did not enter | | | | | | | |
| (Turkey) 2021 | 6th | 4 | 1 | 0 | 3 | 113 | 99 | +14 |
| (Saudi Arabia) 2025 | 3rd | 5 | 3 | 0 | 2 | 155 | 124 | +31 |
| (Malaysia) 2029 | Future event | | | | | | | |
| Total | | | | | | | | |

=== Indoor and Martial Arts Games ===
| Tournament | Ranking | Pld | W | D | L | GS | GA | Dif |
|---|---|---|---|---|---|---|---|---|
| (Saudi Arabia) 2026 | | | | | | | | |
| Total | | | | | | | | |

=== West Asian Championship ===
| Tournament | Ranking | Pld | W | D | L | GS | GA | Dif |
|---|---|---|---|---|---|---|---|---|
| (Qatar) 2016 | Did not enter | | | | | | | |
| (Jordan) 2017 | 1st | 5 | 5 | 0 | 0 | 161 | 66 | +95 |
| (Lebanon) 2019 | Cancelled | | | | | | | |
| (Jordan) 2023 | Did not enter | | | | | | | |
| Total | – | 5 | 5 | 0 | 0 | 161 | 66 | +95 |

== Current squad ==
Roster for the 2025 World Women's Handball Championship.

Head coach: Ana Teixeira

| No. | Pos. | Name | Date of birth (age) | Height | App. | Goals | Club |
|---|---|---|---|---|---|---|---|
| 4 | LB | Fatemeh Merikh | 6 August 2004 (age 22) | 1.70 m | 21 | 35 | (Iran) Foolad Sepahan Isfahan |
| 8 | RW | Haniyeh Karimi | 2 May 2003 (age 23) | 1.73 m | 6 | 2 | (Iran) Perspolis Behbahan |
| 9 | RB | Setareh Rahmanian | 19 November 1994 (age 31) | 1.78 m | 7 | 4 | (Iran) Naft E Gaz Gachsaran |
| 10 | P | Atieh Shahsavari | 16 January 2000 (age 26) | 1.80 m | 133 | 67 | (Iran) Foolad Sepahan Isfahan |
| 12 | GK | Fatemeh Khalili | 30 June 1996 (age 30) | 1.75 m | 47 | 0 | (Iran) Foolad Sepahan Isfahan |
| 17 | CB | Mina Vatanparast | 10 December 1989 (age 36) | 1.67 m | 43 | 115 | (Iran) Sang Ahan Bafaq |
| 19 | LW | Hadiseh Norouzi | 10 November 1998 (age 28) | 1.72 m | 63 | 41 | (Iran) Foolad Sepahan Isfahan |
| 20 | LW | Bahar Eizadgashb | 2 July 2000 (age 26) | 1.64 m | 25 | 34 | (Iran) Foolad Hormozgan Club |
| 22 | GK | Zahra Afshari | 20 February 2007 (age 19) | 1.81 m | 0 | 0 | (Iran) Naft E Gaz Gachsaran |
| 23 | P | Leila Hosseini | 2 December 2003 (age 22) | 1.73 m | 7 | 3 | (Iran) Naft E Gaz Gachsaran |
| 24 | CB | Aseman Badvi | 24 February 2007 (age 19) | 1.75 m | 17 | 28 | (Iran) Sang Ahan Bafaq |
| 25 | LB | Hedieh Hafez | 27 October 1999 (age 27) | 1.70 m | 0 | 0 | (Iran) Foolad Sepahan Isfahan |
| 27 | LB | Arezou Kianiara | 25 January 1994 (age 32) | 1.73 m | 75 | 55 | (Iran) Sang Ahan Bafgh |
| 76 | LB | Nastaran Koudzarifarahani | 10 January 2004 (age 22) | 1.75 m | 8 | 33 | (Iran) Foolad Sepahan Isfahan |
| 96 | RW | Sanaz Rajabi | 15 October 1991 (age 35) | 1.65 m | 106 | 156 | (Iran) Sang Ahan Bafgh |
| 99 | LB | Mozhgan Ghahremani | 6 August 1991 (age 35) | 1.78 m | 170 | 150 | (Iran) Eshtad Sazeh Mashhad |
