= 1987 Asian Women's Handball Championship =

1987 Asian Championship
Tournament details
- Host country: Jordan
- Venue(s): 1 (in 1 host city)
- Dates: 20–27 August
- Teams: 6 (from 1 confederation)

Final positions
- Champions: South Korea (1st title)
- Runners-up: China
- Third place: Japan
- Fourth place: Syria

Tournament statistics
- Matches played: 11
- Goals scored: 557 (50.64 per match)

The 1987 Asian Women's Handball Championship, the first Asian Championship, which was taking place from 20 to 27 August 1987 in Amman, Jordan.

== Preliminary round ==
=== Group A ===
Team	Pld	W	D	L	GF	GA	GD	Pts
South Korea	2	2	0	0	74	27	+47	4
Japan	2	1	0	1	51	52	−1	2
Chinese Taipei	2	0	0	2	31	77	−46	0

20 August 1987	South Korea	32–16	Japan	Amman
20 August 1987		(17–7)		Amman

22 August 1987	South Korea	42–11	Chinese Taipei	Amman
22 August 1987		(11–30)		Amman

23 August 1987	Japan	35–20	Chinese Taipei	Amman
23 August 1987		(15–8)		Amman

=== Group B ===
Team	Pld	W	D	L	GF	GA	GD	Pts
China	2	2	0	0	80	16	+64	4
Syria	2	1	0	1	33	51	−18	2
Jordan (H)	2	0	0	2	19	65	−46	0

(H) Hosts

20 August 1987	Jordan	8–40	China	Amman

22 August 1987	China	40–8	Syria	Amman

23 August 1987	Jordan	11–25	Syria	Amman

== Placement 5th/6th ==
25 August 1987	Chinese Taipei	43–15	Jordan	Amman
25 August 1987		(22–9)		Amman

== Final round ==
Semifinals
South Korea	37
Syria	6
China (ET)	34
Japan	31

Gold medal match
South Korea	34
China	24
Bronze medal match
Syria	9
Japan	26

=== Semifinals ===
25 August 1987	South Korea	37–6	Syria	Amman

25 August 1987
China
34–31 (ET)
Japan
Amman

(12–11)

FT: 24-24 ET: 6-6, 4-1

=== Bronze medal match ===
26 August 1987	Syria	9–23	Japan	Amman
26 August 1987		(4–13)		Amman

=== Gold medal match ===
27 August 1987	South Korea	34–24	China	Amman

== Final standing ==
Rank	Team
1st place, gold medalist(s)	South Korea
2nd place, silver medalist(s)	China
3rd place, bronze medalist(s)	Japan
4	Syria
5	Chinese Taipei
6	Jordan

Team qualified for the 1988 Summer Olympics
