= Jordan women's national handball team =

Jordan

Information
- Association: Jordan Handball Federation

Colours
| 1st | 2nd |

Results

World Championship
- Appearances: none

Asian Championship
- Appearances: 2 (First in 1987)
- Best result: 6th (1987)
- Last updated on 16 September 2021.

Jordan women's national handball team
Medal record

West Asian Handball Championship
| Silver medal – second place | 2017 Amman | Team |
| Silver medal – second place | 2016 Doha | Team |

Pan Arab Games
| Bronze medal – third place | 2011 Doha | Team |
| Bronze medal – third place | 1999 Amman | Team |

The Jordan women's national handball team is the national team of Jordan. It is governed by the Jordan Handball Federation and takes part in international handball competitions.

== Records ==
Champions Runners-up Third place Fourth place

=== Asian Championship ===
| Year | Rank | M | W | D | L | GF | GA | Dif |
|---|---|---|---|---|---|---|---|---|
| (Jordan) 1987 | 6th | 3 | 0 | 0 | 3 | 34 | 118 | −84 |
| (China) 1989 to (Japan) 2018 | Did not enter | | | | | | | |
| (Jordan) 2021 | 7th | 7 | 4 | 0 | 3 | 179 | 168 | +11 |
| Total | 2/18 | 10 | 4 | 0 | 7 | 213 | 286 | −73 |

=== West Asian Championship ===
| Tournament | Rank | Pld | W | D | L | GF | GA | Dif |
|---|---|---|---|---|---|---|---|---|
| (Qatar) 2016 | 2nd | 3 | 2 | 0 | 1 | 78 | 35 | +41 |
| (Jordan) 2017 | 2nd | 5 | 4 | 0 | 1 | 137 | 101 | +36 |
| (Lebanon) 2019 | Cancelled due to insufficient number of teams | | | | | | | |
| Total | 2/2 | 8 | 6 | 0 | 2 | 215 | 136 | +79 |
