= 2016 West Asian Women's Handball Championship =

Tournament details
- Host country: Qatar
- Venue: 1 (in 1 host city)
- Dates: 16 – 19 September 2016
- Teams: 4 (from 1 confederation)

Final positions
- Champions: Qatar (1st title)
- Runners-up: Jordan
- Third place: Iraq
- Fourth place: United Arab Emirates

Tournament statistics
- Matches played: 6
- Goals scored: 240 (40 per match)

‌The 2016 West Asian Women's Handball Championship was the inaugural edition of the championship held under the aegis of Asian Handball Federation. The championship was hosted by Qatar Handball Association at Aspire Dome, Doha (Qatar) from 16 to 19 September 2016.

Qatar won their first title by winning all the matches in a round-robin tournament.

== Participating teams ==
- Iraq
- Jordan
- Qatar (Host)
- United Arab Emirates

== Round-robin ==
Team	Pld	W	D	L	GF	GA	GD	Pts
Qatar	3	3	0	0	88	43	+45	6
Jordan	3	2	0	1	78	37	+41	4
Iraq	3	1	0	2	39	69	−30	2
United Arab Emirates	3	0	0	3	35	91	−56	0

16 September 2016; 17:00	Iraq	5 – 25	Jordan	Doha, Qatar
16 September 2016; 17:00		(4 – 13)		Doha, Qatar

16 September 2016; 18:30	United Arab Emirates	11 – 36	Qatar	Doha, Qatar
16 September 2016; 18:30		(6 – 17)		Doha, Qatar

17 September 2016; 17:00	United Arab Emirates	10 – 34	Jordan	Doha, Qatar
17 September 2016; 17:00		(7 – 17)		Doha, Qatar

17 September 2016; 18:30	Iraq	13 – 30	Qatar	Doha, Qatar
17 September 2016; 18:30		(6 – 13)		Doha, Qatar

19 September 2016; 17:00	Iraq	21 – 14	United Arab Emirates	Doha, Qatar
19 September 2016; 17:00		(9 – 5)		Doha, Qatar

19 September 2016; 18:30	Qatar	22 – 19	Jordan	Doha, Qatar
19 September 2016; 18:30		(11 – 8)		Doha, Qatar

== Final standings ==
Rank	Team
1st place, gold medalist(s)	Qatar (1st title)
2nd place, silver medalist(s)	Jordan
3rd place, bronze medalist(s)	Iraq
4	United Arab Emirates
