= Jordan men's national handball team =

Jordan

Information
- Association: Jordan Handball Federation
- Coach: Zoran Kastratović
- Assistant coach: Mohammad Al-Qise; Aymen Ben Yahia

Colours
1st	2nd

Results

Asian Championship
- Appearances: 8 (First in 1983)
- Best result: 7th (1983, 2006)
- Last updated on Unknown.

The Jordan national handball team is the national handball team of Jordan and is controlled by Jordan Handball Federation.

== Tournament history ==
=== Asian Championship ===
- 1983 – 7th
- 1987 – 9th
- 2004 – 8th
- 2006 – 7th
- 2010 – 12th
- 2012 – 9th
- 2022 – 12th
- 2026 – 11th
