= Qatar women's national handball team =

Qatar

Information
- Association: Qatar Handball Association

Colours
1st	2nd

Results

Asian Championship
- Appearances: 1 (First in 2008)
- Best result: 10th (2008)
- Last updated on Unknown.

The Qatar women's national handball team is the national team of Qatar. It is governed by the Qatar Handball Association and takes part in international handball competitions.

== Team ==
=== Current squad ===
The 16 player squad for the 2025 Islamic Solidarity Games.

Head coach:

No.	Pos.	Name	Date of birth (age)	Height	App.	Goals	Club
		Aljazi Al-Abdulla	9 November 2008 (age 17)
		Noora Al-Mana	30 January 1999 (age 26)
		Bashaer Al-Kuwari	29 July 1996 (age 29)
		Maryam Al-Suwaidi	16 June 1987 (age 38)
		Fatma Al-Suwaidi	26 August 1990 (age 35)
		Hannah Al-Bader	23 June 1991 (age 34)
		Buthaina Al-Muhaizaa	8 June 1979 (age 46)
		Aya Soliman	12 December 1993 (age 31)
		Dhabia Al-Naimi	25 November 1989 (age 35)
		Sara Al-Dossari	25 February 1987 (age 38)
		Aldana Al-Khulaifi	12 April 1991 (age 34)
		Haya Al-Abdulla	25 January 1998 (age 27)
		Sameera Al-Abdulla	2 April 1999 (age 26)
		Jawaher Al-Nassr	16 February 1999 (age 26)
		Maha Al-Mohammed	29 November 2001 (age 23)
		Heba Al-Abdulla	30 December 1998 (age 26)

== Tournament history ==
=== Asian Championship ===
- 2008 – 10th
