= Handball at the 2018 Asian Games – Women's tournament =

Asian Games Handball competition

Women at the 2018 Asian Games
- Venue: POPKI Sports Hall
- Date: 14–30 August 2018
- Competitors: 158 from 10 nations

Medalists
gold medal	South Korea
silver medal	China
bronze medal	Japan

The women's tournament of Handball at the 2018 Asian Games at Jakarta, Indonesia was held between 14 and 30 August 2018. The matches were held at the POPKI Sports Hall.

== Squads ==
China	Hong Kong	India	Indonesia
Lin Yanqun; Zhang Haixia; Li Xiaoqing; Wu Yin; Wu Nana; Yu Yuanyuan; Wang Haiye; Si Wen; Liu Xiaomei; Sha Zhengwen; Yang Jiao; Zhao Jiaqin; Yang Yurou; Li Yao; Qiao Ru; Lan Xiaoling	Chan Kam Ling; Cheung Mei Ngo; Cheung Shu Man; Wong Ching Yu; Tang Man Ting; Tsang Mei Yan; Chung Ka Yu; Leung Sin Ying; Tsang Yuen Lam; Chow Pui Yee; Wu Lei Ling; Leung Tsz Hin; Lam Sze Pui; Wong Shuk Yee; Lee Man Nga; Lam Wai Yu	Nina Shil; Nidhi Sharma; Sushma Ghanghas; Maninder Kaur; Sanjeeta Ruhel; Jyoti Shukla; Banita Sharma; Deepa Thakur; Ritu; Indu Gupta; Kajal; Rimpi; Khila Devi; Diksha Kumari; Priyanka Thakur; Manjula Pathak	Shantika Ayuning Baharizki; Fitri Anggi Yani; Claudia Finka Wiranata; Inge Indah Wijayatri; Dian Ekavianti Fefan; Shinta Hidayatuzzaroh; Lia Apriliani; Ria Astuti; Marselina; Afifatur Rofidiyah; Putri Dwi Merdekawati; Gadis Risma Septiananda; Sri Nurlinda; Anggun Pramesti; Felita Widya Dhana; Anisa Yulianti
Japan	Kazakhstan	Malaysia	North Korea
Kimiko Hida; Mika Nagata; Kaho Sunami; Sayo Shiota; Asuka Fujita; Aya Yokoshima; Minami Itano; Chie Katsuren; Hitomi Tada; Natsumi Akiyama; Nozomi Hara; Mana Ohyama; Shiori Nagata; Miyuki Terada; Tomomi Kawata; Mayuko Ishitate	Irina Danilova; Olga Tankina; Sevara Rejemetova; Anna Kazachenko; Veronika Khardina; Kristina Kapralova; Yelena Suyazova; Tatyana Parfenova; Arailym Abdikhamit; Irina Alexandrova; Tatyana Davydova; Natalya Ilyina; Mariya Pupchenkova; Valeriya Karavayeva; Viktoriya Kolotinskaya; Dana Abilda	Nurul Hafizah Mispani; Norsyamimi Wan Nazri; Nur Alia Saimi; Nur Shaidatul Zubaidi; Noor Haninah Hasri; Nur Amira Wahid; Farah Atifah Ahmad Yusop; Aqilah Hasya Haris Fadzillah; Nurul Irdina Yazid; Dharshiniy Sivan; Nurfarahiyah Yusri; Siti Zubaidah Salleh; Nor Shuhada Zahari; Nur Atikah Azman; Nurshahira Abd Rahman; Nur Asyiqin Rasdi	Ho Ryu-gyong; O Kyong-sun; Choe Chun-il; Kil Mi-hyang; An Ok-sim; Han Jong-hyang; Jang Ok-hyang; Kim Jong-hui; Mun Un-suk; Mun Hong-sim; Kim Chol-sun; Kim Un-gyong; Han Chun-yon; Choe Pong-im
South Korea	Thailand		
Park Sae-young; Kim Seon-hwa; Song Hai-rim; Shin Eun-joo; Kim On-a; Park Mi-ra; Yoo Hyun-ji; Kang Eun-hye; Choi Su-min; Han Mi-seul; Jung Ji-hae; Gim Bo-eun; Song Ji-eun; Lee Hyo-jin; Jung Yu-ra; Yu So-jeong	Pakakan Thongkot; Pawinee Bunjarern; Preechaya Junmanee; Thitima Sriratbuaphan; Wantanee Wichaisang; Jenjira Paochanoun; Chuenkamol Inthong; Suphaporn Yaemyim; Nuttawadee Saisod; Kwanruedi Srithamma; Nittaya Joisakoo; Kawinthida Janjit; Siriyaporn Boonnet; Sunanta Hongbooddee; Dujduan Matarit; Suphansa Thongnum		

== Results ==
All times are Western Indonesia Time (UTC+07:00)

=== Preliminary round ===
==== Group A ====
Pos	Team	Pld	W	D	L	GF	GA	GD	Pts	Qualification
1	South Korea	4	4	0	0	151	86	+65	8	Semifinals
2	China	4	2	0	2	120	112	+8	4 (Note: Tied on head-to-head points (2). Head-to-head goal difference: CHN +2, PRK +1, KAZ −3.)	Semifinals
3	North Korea	4	2	0	2	139	125	+14	4	Classification 5th–8th
4	Kazakhstan	4	2	0	2	118	116	+2	4	Classification 5th–8th
5	India	4	0	0	4	77	166	−89	0	Classification 9th–10th

Source: AHF
Notes:

14 August; 11:00	India	19–36	Kazakhstan	POPKI Sports Hall, Jakarta; Referees: Lee, Koo (KOR)
14 August; 11:00	Rimpi 8	(13–19)	Abilda 8	POPKI Sports Hall, Jakarta; Referees: Lee, Koo (KOR)
14 August; 11:00	2× (yellow card) 5× (suspension)		2× (yellow card) 2× (suspension)	POPKI Sports Hall, Jakarta; Referees: Lee, Koo (KOR)

14 August; 16:00	North Korea	22–39	South Korea	POPKI Sports Hall, Jakarta; Referees: Al-Marhoon, Al-Mawt (BHR)
14 August; 16:00	Han C. 5	(12–17)	Jung Y. 12	POPKI Sports Hall, Jakarta; Referees: Al-Marhoon, Al-Mawt (BHR)
14 August; 16:00	1× (yellow card) 5× (suspension)		3× (yellow card) 4× (suspension)	POPKI Sports Hall, Jakarta; Referees: Al-Marhoon, Al-Mawt (BHR)

16 August; 16:00	India	18–45	South Korea	POPKI Sports Hall, Jakarta; Referees: Shakir, Kadhim (IRQ)
16 August; 16:00	Ritu 6	(9–20)	Yu 12	POPKI Sports Hall, Jakarta; Referees: Shakir, Kadhim (IRQ)
16 August; 16:00	1× (yellow card) 4× (suspension)		1× (yellow card) 1× (suspension)	POPKI Sports Hall, Jakarta; Referees: Shakir, Kadhim (IRQ)

16 August; 18:00	China	26–27	Kazakhstan	POPKI Sports Hall, Jakarta; Referees: Hizaki, Ikebuchi (JPN)
16 August; 18:00	Li Y. 6	(11–11)	Abilda 7	POPKI Sports Hall, Jakarta; Referees: Hizaki, Ikebuchi (JPN)
16 August; 18:00	1× (yellow card) 8× (suspension)		5× (suspension)	POPKI Sports Hall, Jakarta; Referees: Hizaki, Ikebuchi (JPN)

19 August; 16:00	India	21–36	China	POPKI Sports Hall, Jakarta; Referees: Al-Saqer, Al-Suqufi (KSA)
19 August; 16:00	Kaur 10	(9–19)	Zhang 7	POPKI Sports Hall, Jakarta; Referees: Al-Saqer, Al-Suqufi (KSA)
19 August; 16:00	3× (yellow card) 2× (suspension)		2× (yellow card) 4× (suspension)	POPKI Sports Hall, Jakarta; Referees: Al-Saqer, Al-Suqufi (KSA)

19 August; 18:00	Kazakhstan	33–37	North Korea	POPKI Sports Hall, Jakarta; Referees: Shakir, Kadhim (IRQ)
19 August; 18:00	Abilda 10	(17–17)	O 9	POPKI Sports Hall, Jakarta; Referees: Shakir, Kadhim (IRQ)
19 August; 18:00	3× (yellow card) 1× (suspension)		4× (suspension)	POPKI Sports Hall, Jakarta; Referees: Shakir, Kadhim (IRQ)

21 August; 14:00	North Korea	49–19	India	POPKI Sports Hall, Jakarta; Referees: Hizaki, Ikebuchi (JPN)
21 August; 14:00	Choe P. 11	(23–10)	Ghanghas, Kaur, Rimpi 4	POPKI Sports Hall, Jakarta; Referees: Hizaki, Ikebuchi (JPN)
21 August; 14:00	2× (yellow card) 3× (suspension)		3× (yellow card) 4× (suspension)	POPKI Sports Hall, Jakarta; Referees: Hizaki, Ikebuchi (JPN)

21 August; 18:00	China	24–33	South Korea	POPKI Sports Hall, Jakarta; Referees: Al-Wahibi, Al-Shahi (OMA)
21 August; 18:00	Liu 5	(11–14)	Jung Y. 8	POPKI Sports Hall, Jakarta; Referees: Al-Wahibi, Al-Shahi (OMA)
21 August; 18:00	3× (yellow card) 1× (suspension)		3× (yellow card) 1× (suspension)	POPKI Sports Hall, Jakarta; Referees: Al-Wahibi, Al-Shahi (OMA)

23 August; 14:00	North Korea	31–34	China	POPKI Sports Hall, Jakarta; Referees: Ota, Shimajiri (JPN)
23 August; 14:00	Choe C. 8	(14–17)	Liu 13	POPKI Sports Hall, Jakarta; Referees: Ota, Shimajiri (JPN)
23 August; 14:00	2× (yellow card) 3× (suspension)		1× (yellow card) 2× (suspension)	POPKI Sports Hall, Jakarta; Referees: Ota, Shimajiri (JPN)

23 August; 16:00	South Korea	34–22	Kazakhstan	POPKI Sports Hall, Jakarta; Referees: Li, Ke (CHN)
23 August; 16:00	Yu 7	(17–11)	Suyazova, Abilda 5	POPKI Sports Hall, Jakarta; Referees: Li, Ke (CHN)
23 August; 16:00	1× (yellow card) 2× (suspension)		1× (yellow card) 3× (suspension)	POPKI Sports Hall, Jakarta; Referees: Li, Ke (CHN)

==== Group B ====
Pos	Team	Pld	W	D	L	GF	GA	GD	Pts	Qualification
1	Japan	4	4	0	0	208	38	+170	8	Semifinals
2	Thailand	4	3	0	1	120	93	+27	6	Semifinals
3	Hong Kong	4	2	0	2	112	97	+15	4	Classification 5th–8th
4	Indonesia	4	1	0	3	56	146	−90	2	Classification 5th–8th
5	Malaysia	4	0	0	4	45	167	−122	0	Classification 9th–10th

Source: AHF

14 August; 14:00	Thailand	16–41	Japan	POPKI Sports Hall, Jakarta; Referees: Tavakkoli, Valadkhanian (IRI)
14 August; 14:00	Bunjarern 7	(6–23)	Akiyama 8	POPKI Sports Hall, Jakarta; Referees: Tavakkoli, Valadkhanian (IRI)
14 August; 14:00	4× (yellow card) 2× (suspension)		3× (yellow card) 4× (suspension)	POPKI Sports Hall, Jakarta; Referees: Tavakkoli, Valadkhanian (IRI)

14 August; 18:00	Malaysia	15–23	Indonesia	POPKI Sports Hall, Jakarta; Referees: Al-Saqer, Al-Suqufi (KSA)
14 August; 18:00	Yusri 4	(9–12)	Apriliani 7	POPKI Sports Hall, Jakarta; Referees: Al-Saqer, Al-Suqufi (KSA)
14 August; 18:00	2× (yellow card) 8× (suspension) 1× (red card)		3× (yellow card) 2× (suspension)	POPKI Sports Hall, Jakarta; Referees: Al-Saqer, Al-Suqufi (KSA)

16 August; 11:00	Thailand	34–16	Indonesia	POPKI Sports Hall, Jakarta; Referees: Li, Ke (CHN)
16 August; 11:00	Hongbooddee 10	(19–6)	Wijayatri 4	POPKI Sports Hall, Jakarta; Referees: Li, Ke (CHN)
16 August; 11:00	2× (yellow card) 3× (suspension)		3× (yellow card) 4× (suspension)	POPKI Sports Hall, Jakarta; Referees: Li, Ke (CHN)

16 August; 14:00	Hong Kong	13–41	Japan	POPKI Sports Hall, Jakarta; Referees: Tavakkoli, Valadkhanian (IRI)
16 August; 14:00	Cheung M. 6	(5–18)	Fujita, Akiyama 6	POPKI Sports Hall, Jakarta; Referees: Tavakkoli, Valadkhanian (IRI)
16 August; 14:00	2× (yellow card) 4× (suspension)		3× (yellow card) 2× (suspension)	POPKI Sports Hall, Jakarta; Referees: Tavakkoli, Valadkhanian (IRI)

19 August; 11:00	Thailand	30–24	Hong Kong	POPKI Sports Hall, Jakarta; Referees: Al-Wahibi, Al-Shahi (OMA)
19 August; 11:00	Bunjarern 10	(13–10)	Wu 7	POPKI Sports Hall, Jakarta; Referees: Al-Wahibi, Al-Shahi (OMA)
19 August; 11:00	2× (yellow card) 5× (suspension)		3× (yellow card) 4× (suspension)	POPKI Sports Hall, Jakarta; Referees: Al-Wahibi, Al-Shahi (OMA)

19 August; 14:00	Japan	64–3	Malaysia	POPKI Sports Hall, Jakarta; Referees: Li, Ke (CHN)
19 August; 14:00	Kawata 10	(32–2)	Yusop 2	POPKI Sports Hall, Jakarta; Referees: Li, Ke (CHN)
19 August; 14:00			2× (suspension)	POPKI Sports Hall, Jakarta; Referees: Li, Ke (CHN)

21 August; 16:00	Malaysia	12–40	Thailand	POPKI Sports Hall, Jakarta; Referees: Li, Ke (CHN)
21 August; 16:00	five players 2	(5–24)	Yaemyim 11	POPKI Sports Hall, Jakarta; Referees: Li, Ke (CHN)
21 August; 16:00	7× (suspension) 1× (red card)			POPKI Sports Hall, Jakarta; Referees: Li, Ke (CHN)

21 August; 20:00	Hong Kong	35–11	Indonesia	POPKI Sports Hall, Jakarta; Referees: Shakir, Kadhim (IRQ)
21 August; 20:00	Wu 12	(17–5)	five players 2	POPKI Sports Hall, Jakarta; Referees: Shakir, Kadhim (IRQ)
21 August; 20:00	1× (yellow card) 2× (suspension)		1× (yellow card) 4× (suspension)	POPKI Sports Hall, Jakarta; Referees: Shakir, Kadhim (IRQ)

23 August; 11:00	Malaysia	15–40	Hong Kong	POPKI Sports Hall, Jakarta; Referees: Al-Saqer, Al-Suqufi (KSA)
23 August; 11:00	Saimi 5	(9–23)	Cheung M. 7	POPKI Sports Hall, Jakarta; Referees: Al-Saqer, Al-Suqufi (KSA)
23 August; 11:00	2× (yellow card) 3× (suspension)			POPKI Sports Hall, Jakarta; Referees: Al-Saqer, Al-Suqufi (KSA)

23 August; 18:00	Indonesia	6–62	Japan	POPKI Sports Hall, Jakarta; Referees: Lee, Lee (KOR)
23 August; 18:00	Apriliani 4	(4–34)	Kawata 11	POPKI Sports Hall, Jakarta; Referees: Lee, Lee (KOR)
23 August; 18:00	1× (yellow card) 6× (suspension)		2× (yellow card)	POPKI Sports Hall, Jakarta; Referees: Lee, Lee (KOR)

=== Classification 9th–10th ===
25 August; 14:00	India	54–19	Malaysia	POPKI Sports Hall, Jakarta; Referees: Ota, Shimajiri (JPN)
25 August; 14:00	D. Thakur, Gupta, Devi 8	(19–5)	Yusop 7	POPKI Sports Hall, Jakarta; Referees: Ota, Shimajiri (JPN)
25 August; 14:00	2× (yellow card) 4× (suspension)		2× (yellow card) 6× (suspension)	POPKI Sports Hall, Jakarta; Referees: Ota, Shimajiri (JPN)

=== Classification 5th–8th ===
Classification 5–8
25 August
North Korea	59
Indonesia	19
25 August
Hong Kong	23
Kazakhstan	35

Classification 5th–6th
29 August
North Korea	32
Kazakhstan	30
Classification 7th–8th
29 August
Indonesia	16
Hong Kong	30

==== Semifinals ====
25 August; 16:00	North Korea	59–15	Indonesia	POPKI Sports Hall, Jakarta; Referees: Al-Wahibi, Al-Shahi (OMA)
25 August; 16:00	Choe P. 13	(28–6)	Apriliani 7	POPKI Sports Hall, Jakarta; Referees: Al-Wahibi, Al-Shahi (OMA)
25 August; 16:00	1× (yellow card) 1× (suspension)		2× (yellow card) 5× (suspension)	POPKI Sports Hall, Jakarta; Referees: Al-Wahibi, Al-Shahi (OMA)

25 August; 18:00	Hong Kong	23–35	Kazakhstan	POPKI Sports Hall, Jakarta; Referees: Lee, Lee (KOR)
25 August; 18:00	Cheung M. 7	(9–15)	Ilyina 10	POPKI Sports Hall, Jakarta; Referees: Lee, Lee (KOR)
25 August; 18:00	2× (yellow card) 2× (suspension)		2× (yellow card) 2× (suspension)	POPKI Sports Hall, Jakarta; Referees: Lee, Lee (KOR)

==== Classification 7th–8th ====
29 August; 11:00	Indonesia	16–30	Hong Kong	POPKI Sports Hall, Jakarta; Referees: Lee, Lee (KOR)
29 August; 11:00	Baharizki, Apriliani 4	(8–18)	Cheung M. 10	POPKI Sports Hall, Jakarta; Referees: Lee, Lee (KOR)
29 August; 11:00	2× (yellow card) 4× (suspension)		2× (yellow card) 5× (suspension)	POPKI Sports Hall, Jakarta; Referees: Lee, Lee (KOR)

==== Classification 5th–6th ====
29 August; 16:00	North Korea	32–30	Kazakhstan	POPKI Sports Hall, Jakarta; Referees: Ota, Shimajiri (JPN)
29 August; 16:00	Mun U. 12	(16–13)	Ilyina 9	POPKI Sports Hall, Jakarta; Referees: Ota, Shimajiri (JPN)
29 August; 16:00	2× (yellow card) 3× (suspension)		1× (yellow card) 5× (suspension)	POPKI Sports Hall, Jakarta; Referees: Ota, Shimajiri (JPN)

=== Final round ===
Semifinals
27 August
South Korea	40
Thailand	13
27 August
Japan	31
China	32

Gold medal match
30 August
South Korea	29
China	23
Bronze medal match
30 August
Thailand	14
Japan	43

==== Semifinals ====
27 August; 11:00	South Korea	40–13	Thailand	POPKI Sports Hall, Jakarta; Referees: Ota, Shimajiri (JPN)
27 August; 11:00	Choi 9	(16–7)	Paochanoun, Yaemyim, Joisakoo 3	POPKI Sports Hall, Jakarta; Referees: Ota, Shimajiri (JPN)
27 August; 11:00	2× (yellow card) 1× (suspension)		2× (yellow card) 1× (suspension)	POPKI Sports Hall, Jakarta; Referees: Ota, Shimajiri (JPN)

27 August; 16:00	Japan	31–32	China	POPKI Sports Hall, Jakarta; Referees: Al-Wahibi, Al-Shahi (OMA)
27 August; 16:00	Yokoshima, Akiyama 6	(15–13)	Liu 11	POPKI Sports Hall, Jakarta; Referees: Al-Wahibi, Al-Shahi (OMA)
27 August; 16:00	2× (yellow card) 2× (suspension)		2× (yellow card)	POPKI Sports Hall, Jakarta; Referees: Al-Wahibi, Al-Shahi (OMA)

==== Bronze medal match ====
30 August; 16:00	Thailand	14–43	Japan	POPKI Sports Hall, Jakarta; Referees: Lee, Lee (KOR)
30 August; 16:00	Bunjarern 6	(6–20)	Fujita, Akiyama, Kawata 6	POPKI Sports Hall, Jakarta; Referees: Lee, Lee (KOR)
30 August; 16:00	2× (yellow card) 5× (suspension)		3× (yellow card) 2× (suspension)	POPKI Sports Hall, Jakarta; Referees: Lee, Lee (KOR)

==== Gold medal match ====
30 August; 18:00	South Korea	29–23	China	POPKI Sports Hall, Jakarta; Referees: Ota, Shimajiri (JPN)
30 August; 18:00	Jung Y. 8	(12–9)	Liu 10	POPKI Sports Hall, Jakarta; Referees: Ota, Shimajiri (JPN)
30 August; 18:00	2× (yellow card)		3× (yellow card) 2× (suspension)	POPKI Sports Hall, Jakarta; Referees: Ota, Shimajiri (JPN)

== Final standing ==
Rank	Team	Pld	W	D	L
1st place, gold medalist(s)	South Korea	6	6	0	0
2nd place, silver medalist(s)	China	6	3	0	3
3rd place, bronze medalist(s)	Japan	6	5	0	1
4	Thailand	6	3	0	3
5	North Korea	6	4	0	2
6	Kazakhstan	6	3	0	3
7	Hong Kong	6	3	0	3
8	Indonesia	6	1	0	5
9	India	5	1	0	4
10	Malaysia	5	0	0	5
