= Handball at the 2014 Asian Games – Women's tournament =

Women at the 2014 Asian Games
- Venue: Suwon Gymnasium; Seonhak Handball Gymnasium
- Date: 20 September – 1 October 2014
- Competitors: 141 from 9 nations

Medalists
| gold medal | South Korea |
| silver medal | Japan |
| bronze medal | Kazakhstan |

Women's handball at the 2014 Asian Games was held in Incheon, South Korea from September 20 to October 1, 2014.

== Squads ==
| China | Hong Kong | India | Japan |
|---|---|---|---|
| Xu Mo; Chen Qian; Wu Nana; Gong Yan; Shen Ping; Wang Bin; Huang Hong; Wu Yin; Hou Yibo; Li Xiaoqing; Sha Zhengwen; Zhang Haixia; Yang Jiao; Zhao Jiaqin; Li Yao; Qiao Ru | Chan Kam Ling; Cheng Ching Hang; Lau Sze Wan; Wong Shuk Yee; Cheung Mei Ngo; Chung Ka Yu; Wan Oi Man; Sum Ming Yee; Chiu Chit Kwan; Lee Ching Ngan; Leung Sin Ying; Tsang Ching Man; Wu Lei Ling; Lai Mei Yu; Wong Wing Tung; Lam Wai Yu | Priyanka; Manisha Rathore; Varuni Negi; Rajwant Kaur; Sanjeeta Ruhel; Preeti Jangra; Anumit; Rimpi; Ritu; Deepa Thakur; Gurmail Kaur; Sonia; Indu Gupta; Gurpreet Kaur; Maninder Kaur; Tintu Abraham | Kimiko Hida; Megumi Honda; Mikako Ishino; Arata Nishikiori; Kaoru Yokoshima; Chie Katsuren; Aya Yokoshima; Yui Sunami; Sato Shiroishi; Yuko Arihama; Mayuko Ishitate; Rino Aizawa; Kaori Fujima; Nozomi Hara; Shiori Nagata; Anri Matsumura |
| Kazakhstan | Maldives | South Korea | Thailand |
| Yevgeniya Tsupenkova; Rizagul Mukanova; Olga Tankina; Marina Pikalova; Viktoriya Kolotinskaya; Xeniya Volnukhina; Anastassiya Rodina; Yelena Suyazova; Tatyana Parfenova; Natalya Ilyina; Irina Alexandrova; Irina Danilova; Yelena Klimenko; Polina Mikhailova; Kristina Kapralova | Fathimath Rishma; Juwairiya Mohamed; Aishath Leen Abdulla Amir; Husna Mohamed; Shizna Rasheed; Aminath Nazra; Ishrath Hameed; Zulaikha Ibrahim; Hudha Zaki; Mariyam Manal; Nahidha Ahmed; Nashfa Amira; Aishath Reema; Aminath Israau Abdul Shukoor | Park Sae-young; Kim Seon-hwa; Jung Yu-ra; Won Seon-pil; Ryu Eun-hee; Park Mi-ra; Yoo Hyun-ji; Kim Jin-yi; Choi Su-min; Song Mi-young; Sim Hae-in; Jung Ji-hae; Kim On-a; Lee Eun-bi; Woo Sun-hee; Gwon Han-na | Kadnarin Kangrit; Suphatcharaporn Boonmi; Phatcharavadee Sukcharoen; Thippawan Wongmak; Pattarasiri Thanawat; Patchara Nunsuwan; Sarocha Samaair; Khuearat Kammor; Sunanta Hongbooddee; Wongduean Sawatporn; Chuenkamol Intong; Suphansa Thongnum; Siriluk Jantahom; Pornpimon Meethuen; Lamduan Maneesa; Suphaporn Yaemyim |
| Uzbekistan | | | |
| Lutfie Useinova; Surayyokhon Abdulhamidova; Khabibakhon Kodirova; Gulmira Najmedinova; Angelina Goloskokova; Alina Sukhoplyasova; Svetlana Ibragimova; Anastasiya Mustafaeva; Kristina Ofitserova; Olga Ziborova; Ekaterina Khalmuratova; Dilnozahon Hasanova; Valeriya Uchaeva; Dilbarhon Bahromova; Elena Udiryakova; Valentina Zinoveva | | | |

== Results ==
All times are Korea Standard Time (UTC+09:00)

=== Preliminary round ===
==== Group A ====
| Pos | Team | Pld | W | D | L | GF | GA | GD | Pts | Qualification |
|---|---|---|---|---|---|---|---|---|---|---|
| 1 | South Korea | 3 | 3 | 0 | 0 | 131 | 39 | +92 | 6 | Semifinals |
| 2 | China | 3 | 2 | 0 | 1 | 99 | 68 | +31 | 4 | Semifinals |
| 3 | Thailand | 3 | 0 | 1 | 2 | 53 | 113 | −60 | 1 (Note: Head-to-head result: THA 26–26 IND. Overall goal difference was used as the tiebreaker.) | Classification 5–8 |
| 4 | India | 3 | 0 | 1 | 2 | 49 | 112 | −63 | 1 | Classification 5–8 |

Source: Results
Notes:

| 20 September; 16:00 | India | 11–47 | South Korea | Suwon Gymnasium, Suwon; Referees: Shimajiri, Ota (JPN) |
| 20 September; 16:00 | R. Kaur 6 | (3–25) | Kim S. 8 | Suwon Gymnasium, Suwon; Referees: Shimajiri, Ota (JPN) |
| 20 September; 16:00 | 2× (yellow card) 7× (suspension) | | 3× (yellow card) | Suwon Gymnasium, Suwon; Referees: Shimajiri, Ota (JPN) |

| 21 September; 18:00 | Thailand | 26–26 | India | Suwon Gymnasium, Suwon; Referees: Shimajiri, Ota (JPN) |
| 21 September; 18:00 | Sawatporn 6 | (15–10) | Rathore 8 | Suwon Gymnasium, Suwon; Referees: Shimajiri, Ota (JPN) |
| 21 September; 18:00 | 3× (yellow card) 6× (suspension) | | 3× (yellow card) 5× (suspension) | Suwon Gymnasium, Suwon; Referees: Shimajiri, Ota (JPN) |

| 22 September; 16:00 | South Korea | 49–6 | Thailand | Suwon Gymnasium, Suwon; Referees: Zohari (UAE), Shakir (IRQ) |
| 22 September; 16:00 | Kim S. 10 | (23–3) | Kammor 2 | Suwon Gymnasium, Suwon; Referees: Zohari (UAE), Shakir (IRQ) |
| 22 September; 16:00 | 2× (yellow card) | | 3× (yellow card) 4× (suspension) | Suwon Gymnasium, Suwon; Referees: Zohari (UAE), Shakir (IRQ) |

| 22 September; 20:00 | India | 12–39 | China | Suwon Gymnasium, Suwon; Referees: Kadhim, Shakir (IRQ) |
| 22 September; 20:00 | M. Kaur 4 | (6–20) | Zhang 6 | Suwon Gymnasium, Suwon; Referees: Kadhim, Shakir (IRQ) |
| 22 September; 20:00 | 3× (yellow card) 1× (suspension) | | 3× (yellow card) 1× (suspension) | Suwon Gymnasium, Suwon; Referees: Kadhim, Shakir (IRQ) |

| 24 September; 18:00 | China | 22–35 | South Korea | Suwon Gymnasium, Suwon; Referees: Mousavian, Kolahdouzan (IRI) |
| 24 September; 18:00 | Chen, Gong 4 | (10–17) | Woo 7 | Suwon Gymnasium, Suwon; Referees: Mousavian, Kolahdouzan (IRI) |
| 24 September; 18:00 | 3× (yellow card) 7× (suspension) | | 2× (yellow card) 4× (suspension) | Suwon Gymnasium, Suwon; Referees: Mousavian, Kolahdouzan (IRI) |

| 25 September; 15:00 | China | 38–21 | Thailand | Suwon Gymnasium, Suwon; Referees: Zohari (UAE), Koo (KOR) |
| 25 September; 15:00 | Shen 7 | (21–5) | Kangrit, Sawatporn 5 | Suwon Gymnasium, Suwon; Referees: Zohari (UAE), Koo (KOR) |
| 25 September; 15:00 | 3× (yellow card) 2× (suspension) | | 3× (yellow card) | Suwon Gymnasium, Suwon; Referees: Zohari (UAE), Koo (KOR) |

==== Group B ====
| Pos | Team | Pld | W | D | L | GF | GA | GD | Pts | Qualification |
|---|---|---|---|---|---|---|---|---|---|---|
| 1 | Japan | 4 | 4 | 0 | 0 | 190 | 46 | +144 | 8 | Semifinals |
| 2 | Kazakhstan | 4 | 3 | 0 | 1 | 153 | 64 | +89 | 6 | Semifinals |
| 3 | Uzbekistan | 4 | 2 | 0 | 2 | 121 | 117 | +4 | 4 | Classification 5–8 |
| 4 | Hong Kong | 4 | 1 | 0 | 3 | 84 | 107 | −23 | 2 | Classification 5–8 |
| 5 | Maldives | 4 | 0 | 0 | 4 | 19 | 233 | −214 | 0 | |

Source: Results

| 20 September; 18:00 | Hong Kong | 8–37 | Japan | Suwon Gymnasium, Suwon; Referees: Lee, Lee (KOR) |
| 20 September; 18:00 | Sum, Lai 2 | (2–18) | Matsumura 7 | Suwon Gymnasium, Suwon; Referees: Lee, Lee (KOR) |
| 20 September; 18:00 | 1× (yellow card) 2× (suspension) | | 3× (yellow card) 2× (suspension) | Suwon Gymnasium, Suwon; Referees: Lee, Lee (KOR) |

| 20 September; 20:00 | Uzbekistan | 57–7 | Maldives | Suwon Gymnasium, Suwon; Referees: Nuangthanee, Outyana (THA) |
| 20 September; 20:00 | Bahromova 12 | (24–3) | Rishma 5 | Suwon Gymnasium, Suwon; Referees: Nuangthanee, Outyana (THA) |
| 20 September; 20:00 | 2× (yellow card) 2× (suspension) | | 10× (suspension) | Suwon Gymnasium, Suwon; Referees: Nuangthanee, Outyana (THA) |

| 21 September; 16:00 | Japan | 79–0 | Maldives | Suwon Gymnasium, Suwon; Referees: Nuangthanee, Outyana (THA) |
| 21 September; 16:00 | Aizawa 16 | (40–0) | 0 | Suwon Gymnasium, Suwon; Referees: Nuangthanee, Outyana (THA) |
| 21 September; 16:00 | 1× (suspension) | | 3× (yellow card) 5× (suspension) | Suwon Gymnasium, Suwon; Referees: Nuangthanee, Outyana (THA) |

| 21 September; 20:00 | Hong Kong | 13–40 | Kazakhstan | Suwon Gymnasium, Suwon; Referees: Kadhim, Shakir (IRQ) |
| 21 September; 20:00 | Tsang 4 | (8–19) | Alexandrova 9 | Suwon Gymnasium, Suwon; Referees: Kadhim, Shakir (IRQ) |
| 21 September; 20:00 | 3× (yellow card) 3× (suspension) | | 3× (yellow card) 3× (suspension) | Suwon Gymnasium, Suwon; Referees: Kadhim, Shakir (IRQ) |

| 22 September; 14:00 | Kazakhstan | 37–23 | Uzbekistan | Suwon Gymnasium, Suwon; Referees: Yin, Mei (CHN) |
| 22 September; 14:00 | Volnukhina 9 | (20–10) | Goloskokova, Mustafaeva 6 | Suwon Gymnasium, Suwon; Referees: Yin, Mei (CHN) |
| 22 September; 14:00 | 3× (yellow card) 3× (suspension) | | 3× (yellow card) 4× (suspension) | Suwon Gymnasium, Suwon; Referees: Yin, Mei (CHN) |

| 22 September; 18:00 | Maldives | 7–41 | Hong Kong | Suwon Gymnasium, Suwon; Referees: Shimajiri, Ota (JPN) |
| 22 September; 18:00 | Rishma 4 | (3–21) | Lai 7 | Suwon Gymnasium, Suwon; Referees: Shimajiri, Ota (JPN) |
| 22 September; 18:00 | 1× (yellow card) 4× (suspension) | | 3× (yellow card) 1× (suspension) | Suwon Gymnasium, Suwon; Referees: Shimajiri, Ota (JPN) |

| 24 September; 16:00 | Kazakhstan | 56–5 | Maldives | Suwon Gymnasium, Suwon; Referees: Zohari (UAE), Kadhim (IRQ) |
| 24 September; 16:00 | Klimenko 9 | (27–3) | Rishma 3 | Suwon Gymnasium, Suwon; Referees: Zohari (UAE), Kadhim (IRQ) |
| 24 September; 16:00 | 3× (yellow card) 2× (suspension) | | 3× (yellow card) 1× (suspension) | Suwon Gymnasium, Suwon; Referees: Zohari (UAE), Kadhim (IRQ) |

| 24 September; 20:00 | Uzbekistan | 18–51 | Japan | Suwon Gymnasium, Suwon; Referees: Nuangthanee, Outyana (THA) |
| 24 September; 20:00 | Sukhoplyasova, Ofitserova 4 | (12–26) | Hara, Matsumura 7 | Suwon Gymnasium, Suwon; Referees: Nuangthanee, Outyana (THA) |
| 24 September; 20:00 | 3× (yellow card) 9× (suspension) 1× (red card) | | 3× (yellow card) 6× (suspension) | Suwon Gymnasium, Suwon; Referees: Nuangthanee, Outyana (THA) |

| 25 September; 13:00 | Uzbekistan | 23–22 | Hong Kong | Suwon Gymnasium, Suwon; Referees: Ota, Shimajiri (JPN) |
| 25 September; 13:00 | Sukhoplyasova, Khalmuratova 5 | (9–12) | Cheung 5 | Suwon Gymnasium, Suwon; Referees: Ota, Shimajiri (JPN) |
| 25 September; 13:00 | 3× (yellow card) 6× (suspension) | | 3× (yellow card) 3× (suspension) | Suwon Gymnasium, Suwon; Referees: Ota, Shimajiri (JPN) |

| 25 September; 17:00 | Japan | 23–20 | Kazakhstan | Suwon Gymnasium, Suwon; Referees: Al-Marhoon, Al-Mawt (BHR) |
| 25 September; 17:00 | Sunami, Ishitate, Matsumura 5 | (12–8) | Alexandrova 9 | Suwon Gymnasium, Suwon; Referees: Al-Marhoon, Al-Mawt (BHR) |
| 25 September; 17:00 | 3× (yellow card) 10× (suspension) | | 3× (yellow card) 4× (suspension) | Suwon Gymnasium, Suwon; Referees: Al-Marhoon, Al-Mawt (BHR) |

=== Classification 5–8 ===
Semifinals
28 September
Thailand | 23
Hong Kong | 24
28 September
Uzbekistan | 44
India | 26

Classification 5th–6th
30 September
Hong Kong | 16
Uzbekistan | 26
Classification 7th–8th
30 September
Thailand (p) | 26 (5)
India | 26 (4)

==== Semifinals ====
| 28 September; 12:00 | Thailand | 23–24 | Hong Kong | Seonhak Handball Gymnasium, Incheon; Referees: Shakir, Kadhim (IRQ) |
| 28 September; 12:00 | Wongmak 6 | (11–11) | four players 4 | Seonhak Handball Gymnasium, Incheon; Referees: Shakir, Kadhim (IRQ) |
| 28 September; 12:00 | 3× (yellow card) 1× (suspension) | | 3× (yellow card) 3× (suspension) | Seonhak Handball Gymnasium, Incheon; Referees: Shakir, Kadhim (IRQ) |

| 28 September; 14:00 | Uzbekistan | 44–26 | India | Seonhak Handball Gymnasium, Incheon; Referees: Lee, Lee (KOR) |
| 28 September; 14:00 | Goloskokova, Khalmuratova 7 | (22–11) | Rathore 10 | Seonhak Handball Gymnasium, Incheon; Referees: Lee, Lee (KOR) |
| 28 September; 14:00 | 3× (yellow card) 5× (suspension) | | 2× (yellow card) 3× (suspension) | Seonhak Handball Gymnasium, Incheon; Referees: Lee, Lee (KOR) |

==== Classification 7th–8th ====
30 September
16:00
Thailand
26–26
India
Seonhak Handball Gymnasium, Incheon
Referees: Al-Mawt (BHR), Zohari (UAE)
Kangrit 9
(12–14)
Rathore 10
3× (yellow card) 3× (suspension)

3× (yellow card) 5× (suspension)

FT: 26–26 Pen: 5–4

==== Classification 5th–6th ====
| 30 September; 18:00 | Hong Kong | 16–26 | Uzbekistan | Seonhak Handball Gymnasium, Incheon; Referees: Shimajiri, Ota (JPN) |
| 30 September; 18:00 | Cheng 3 | (7–12) | Goloskokova, Mustafaeva 6 | Seonhak Handball Gymnasium, Incheon; Referees: Shimajiri, Ota (JPN) |
| 30 September; 18:00 | 2× (yellow card) 1× (suspension) | | 3× (yellow card) 6× (suspension) | Seonhak Handball Gymnasium, Incheon; Referees: Shimajiri, Ota (JPN) |

=== Final round ===
Semifinals
28 September
South Korea | 41
Kazakhstan | 30
28 September
Japan | 28
China | 25

Gold medal match
1 October
South Korea | 29
Japan | 19
Bronze medal match
1 October
Kazakhstan | 27
China | 26

==== Semifinals ====
| 28 September; 16:00 | South Korea | 41–30 | Kazakhstan | Seonhak Handball Gymnasium, Incheon; Referees: Al-Suwailam, Al-Mutawa (KUW) |
| 28 September; 16:00 | Woo 10 | (20–16) | Alexandrova 15 | Seonhak Handball Gymnasium, Incheon; Referees: Al-Suwailam, Al-Mutawa (KUW) |
| 28 September; 16:00 | 3× (yellow card) 3× (suspension) | | 3× (yellow card) 5× (suspension) | Seonhak Handball Gymnasium, Incheon; Referees: Al-Suwailam, Al-Mutawa (KUW) |

| 28 September; 18:00 | Japan | 28–25 | China | Seonhak Handball Gymnasium, Incheon; Referees: Al-Marhoon, Al-Mawt (BHR) |
| 28 September; 18:00 | Sunami 9 | (17–10) | Wu Y. 8 | Seonhak Handball Gymnasium, Incheon; Referees: Al-Marhoon, Al-Mawt (BHR) |
| 28 September; 18:00 | 3× (yellow card) 3× (suspension) | | 3× (yellow card) 4× (suspension) | Seonhak Handball Gymnasium, Incheon; Referees: Al-Marhoon, Al-Mawt (BHR) |

==== Bronze medal match ====
| 1 October; 16:00 | Kazakhstan | 27–26 | China | Seonhak Handball Gymnasium, Incheon; Referees: Kolahdouzan, Mousavian (IRI) |
| 1 October; 16:00 | Volnukhina 7 | (14–11) | Shen 8 | Seonhak Handball Gymnasium, Incheon; Referees: Kolahdouzan, Mousavian (IRI) |
| 1 October; 16:00 | 2× (yellow card) 2× (suspension) | | 3× (yellow card) 4× (suspension) | Seonhak Handball Gymnasium, Incheon; Referees: Kolahdouzan, Mousavian (IRI) |

==== Gold medal match ====
| 1 October; 18:00 | South Korea | 29–19 | Japan | Seonhak Handball Gymnasium, Incheon; Referees: Al-Marhoon, Al-Mawt (BHR) |
| 1 October; 18:00 | Ryu 8 | (17–5) | Yokoshima 3 | Seonhak Handball Gymnasium, Incheon; Referees: Al-Marhoon, Al-Mawt (BHR) |
| 1 October; 18:00 | 2× (yellow card) 4× (suspension) | | 2× (yellow card) 4× (suspension) | Seonhak Handball Gymnasium, Incheon; Referees: Al-Marhoon, Al-Mawt (BHR) |

== Final standing ==
| Rank | Team | Pld | W | D | L |
|---|---|---|---|---|---|
| 1st place, gold medalist(s) | South Korea | 5 | 5 | 0 | 0 |
| 2nd place, silver medalist(s) | Japan | 6 | 5 | 0 | 1 |
| 3rd place, bronze medalist(s) | Kazakhstan | 6 | 4 | 0 | 2 |
| 4 | China | 5 | 2 | 0 | 3 |
| 5 | Uzbekistan | 6 | 4 | 0 | 2 |
| 6 | Hong Kong | 6 | 2 | 0 | 4 |
| 7 | Thailand | 5 | 0 | 2 | 3 |
| 8 | India | 5 | 0 | 2 | 3 |
| 9 | Maldives | 4 | 0 | 0 | 4 |
