= Handball at the 2018 Asian Games =

- Venue: POPKI Sports Hall
- Date: 13–31 August 2018
- Competitors: 362 from 17 nations

Handball at the 2018 Asian Games was held at the POPKI Sports Hall, Jakarta, Indonesia, from 13 August to 31 August 2018. In this tournament, 13 teams participated in the men's competition while 10 teams participated in the women's competition.

== Schedule ==
P	Preliminary round	S	Second round	C	Classification	½	Semifinals	F	Finals

Event↓/Date →	13th Mon	14th Tue	15th Wed	16th Thu	17th Fri	18th Sat	19th Sun	20th Mon	21st Tue	22nd Wed	23rd Thu	24th Fri	25th Sat	26th Sun	27th Mon	28th Tue	29th Wed	30th Thu	31st Fri
Men	P		P		P			S	C	S		S		C	½		C		F
Women		P		P			P		P		P		C		½		C	F	

== Medalists ==
Event	Gold	Silver	Bronze
Men	Qatar; Rasheed Yusuff; Bertrand Roiné; Rafael Capote; Frankis Carol; Abdulrazzaq Murad; Danijel Šarić; Goran Stojanović; Firas Chaieb; Amine Guehis; Allaedine Berrached; Wajdi Sinen; Ahmad Madadi; Youssef Benali; Moustafa Heiba; Anis Zouaoui; Ameen Zakkar	Bahrain; Ali Merza; Hasan Al-Samahiji; Isa Khalaf; Mahmood Abdulqader; Mohamed Abdulredha; Mohamed Merza; Mohamed Abdulhusain; Bilal Basham; Hasan Madan; Husain Al-Baboor; Komail Mahfoodh; Jasim Al-Salatna; Ali Abdulqader; Hasan Al-Fardan; Mohamed Habib; Husain Al-Sayyad	South Korea; Jeong Yi-kyeong; Sim Jae-bok; Choi Beom-mun; Jung Su-young; Park Jung-geu; Jo Tae-hun; Jang Dong-hyun; Lee Hyeon-sik; Yoon Ci-yoel; Na Seung-do; Hwang Do-yeop; Kim Dong-cheol; Jeong Jae-wan; Lee Dong-myung; Ku Chang-eun; Lee Chang-woo
Women	South Korea; Park Sae-young; Kim Seon-hwa; Song Hai-rim; Shin Eun-joo; Kim On-a; Park Mi-ra; Yoo Hyun-ji; Kang Eun-hye; Choi Su-min; Han Mi-seul; Jung Ji-hae; Gim Bo-eun; Song Ji-eun; Lee Hyo-jin; Jung Yu-ra; Yu So-jeong	China; Lin Yanqun; Zhang Haixia; Li Xiaoqing; Wu Yin; Wu Nana; Yu Yuanyuan; Wang Haiye; Si Wen; Liu Xiaomei; Sha Zhengwen; Yang Jiao; Zhao Jiaqin; Yang Yurou; Li Yao; Qiao Ru; Lan Xiaoling	Japan; Kimiko Hida; Mika Nagata; Kaho Sunami; Sayo Shiota; Asuka Fujita; Aya Yokoshima; Minami Itano; Chie Katsuren; Hitomi Tada; Natsumi Akiyama; Nozomi Hara; Mana Ohyama; Shiori Nagata; Miyuki Terada; Tomomi Kawata; Mayuko Ishitate

== Medal table ==
Rank	Nation	Gold	Silver	Bronze	Total
1	South Korea (KOR)	1	0	1	2
2	Qatar (QAT)	1	0	0	1
3	Bahrain (BRN)	0	1	0	1
3	China (CHN)	0	1	0	1
5	Japan (JPN)	0	0	1	1
Totals (5 entries)		2	2	2	6

== Draw ==
The draw for the competition was done at the JS Luwansa Hotel, Jakarta on 5 July 2018. The draw was conducted by Indonesian Asian Games Organizing Committee (Inasgoc) in the presence of Asian Handball Federation events officer. The teams were seeded based on their final ranking at the 2014 Asian Games.

=== Men ===
Group A

- Qatar (1)
- Iran (4)
- Malaysia

Group B

- South Korea (2)
- Japan (9)
- Pakistan

Group C

- Indonesia (Host)
- Saudi Arabia (7)
- Hong Kong (11)

Group D

- Bahrain (3)
- Chinese Taipei (8)
- India (14)
- Iraq

=== Women ===
Group A

- South Korea (1)
- Kazakhstan (3)
- China (4)
- India (8)
- North Korea

Group B

- Indonesia (Host)
- Japan (2)
- Hong Kong (6)
- Thailand (7)
- Malaysia

== Final standing ==
=== Men ===
Rank	Team	Pld	W	D	L
1st place, gold medalist(s)	Qatar	7	7	0	0
2nd place, silver medalist(s)	Bahrain	8	7	0	1
3rd place, bronze medalist(s)	South Korea	7	4	1	2
4	Japan	7	2	2	3
5	Iran	6	3	0	3
6	Saudi Arabia	6	2	2	2
7	Iraq	7	3	1	3
8	Hong Kong	6	1	0	5
9	Chinese Taipei	7	5	0	2
10	India	7	3	0	4
11	Pakistan	6	2	0	4
12	Indonesia	6	1	0	5
13	Malaysia	6	0	0	6

=== Women ===
Rank	Team	Pld	W	D	L
1st place, gold medalist(s)	South Korea	6	6	0	0
2nd place, silver medalist(s)	China	6	3	0	3
3rd place, bronze medalist(s)	Japan	6	5	0	1
4	Thailand	6	3	0	3
5	North Korea	6	4	0	2
6	Kazakhstan	6	3	0	3
7	Hong Kong	6	3	0	3
8	Indonesia	6	1	0	5
9	India	5	1	0	4
10	Malaysia	5	0	0	5
