= 2017 Asian Women's Handball Championship =

Tournament details
- Host country: South Korea
- Venue(s): 1 (in 1 host city)
- Dates: 13–22 March
- Teams: 8 (from 1 confederation)

Final positions
- Champions: South Korea (13th title)
- Runner-up: Japan
- Third place: China
- Fourth place: Kazakhstan

Tournament statistics
- Matches played: 20
- Goals scored: 1,095 (54.75 per match)

The 2017 Asian Women's Handball Championship was the 16th edition of the Asian Women's Handball Championship, which took place from 13 to 22 March 2017 in Suwon, South Korea. The tournament was held under the aegis of Asian Handball Federation. It was the second time that South Korea hosted the tournament, after the 1995 Championship. It also acted as the Asian qualifying tournament for the 2017 World Women's Handball Championship.

== Venues ==
2017 Asian Women's Handball Championship is located in South Korea	Suwon
2017 Asian Women's Handball Championship is located in South Korea	Suwon Gymnasium
2017 Asian Women's Handball Championship is located in South Korea	Capacity: 5,145

== Draw ==
The draw was held on 11 January 2017 at the SK Olympic Handball Gymnasium in Seoul, South Korea. Maldives withdrew from the championship after the draw. Vietnam was initially drawn in Group B but was shifted to Group A, to balance number of teams in each group.

Group A	Group B
South Korea	Japan
China	Kazakhstan
Iran	Uzbekistan
~~Maldives~~	Hong Kong
Vietnam	

== Referees ==
Three male and two female referee pairs were selected for the championship. Bahraini, Jordanian and Iranian pairs were male while the rest of two were female:

Referees
Bahrain	Samir Ali Marhoon; Hussain Saeed Al-Mawt
Iran	Mehdi Tavakoli Ataabadi; Saeed Valadkhanian
Japan	Tomoko Ota; Mariko Shimajiri

Referees
Jordan	Yaser Eial Awwad; Akram Al-Zayyat
South Korea	Eunha Lee; Gaeul Lee

== Preliminary round ==
All times are local (UTC+9).

=== Group A ===
Pos	Team	Pld	W	D	L	GF	GA	GD	Pts	Qualification
1	South Korea (H)	3	3	0	0	135	57	+78	6	Semifinals
2	China	3	2	0	1	97	61	+36	4	Semifinals
3	Vietnam	3	1	0	2	54	119	−65	2	
4	Iran	3	0	0	3	61	110	−49	0	

Rules for classification: 1) points; 2) head-to-head points; 3) head-to-head goal difference; 4) head-to-head number of goals scored; 5) goal difference.
(H) Hosts

13 March 2017; 14:15	China	33–8	Iran	Suwon Gymnasium, Suwon; Referees: Al-Zayyat, Awwad (JOR)
13 March 2017; 14:15	Zhang 6	(17–3)	Bapiri 3	Suwon Gymnasium, Suwon; Referees: Al-Zayyat, Awwad (JOR)
13 March 2017; 14:15	3× (yellow card) 3× (suspension)	Report	3× (yellow card) 3× (suspension)	Suwon Gymnasium, Suwon; Referees: Al-Zayyat, Awwad (JOR)

13 March 2017; 16:30	South Korea	48–11	Vietnam	Suwon Gymnasium, Suwon; Referees: Shimajiri, Ota (JPN)
13 March 2017; 16:30	Shin 11	(22–7)	Nguyễn 4	Suwon Gymnasium, Suwon; Referees: Shimajiri, Ota (JPN)
13 March 2017; 16:30	3× (yellow card) 1× (suspension)	Report	2× (suspension)	Suwon Gymnasium, Suwon; Referees: Shimajiri, Ota (JPN)

15 March 2017; 14:15	Vietnam	10–40	China	Suwon Gymnasium, Suwon; Referees: Shimajiri, Ota (JPN)
15 March 2017; 14:15	Trang 3	(5–18)	Lan 7	Suwon Gymnasium, Suwon; Referees: Shimajiri, Ota (JPN)
15 March 2017; 14:15	2× (yellow card)	Report	3× (yellow card)	Suwon Gymnasium, Suwon; Referees: Shimajiri, Ota (JPN)

15 March 2017; 16:30	Iran	22–44	South Korea	Suwon Gymnasium, Suwon; Referees: Al-Mawt, Ali Marhoon (BHR)
15 March 2017; 16:30	four players 3	(9–23)	Choi 7	Suwon Gymnasium, Suwon; Referees: Al-Mawt, Ali Marhoon (BHR)
15 March 2017; 16:30	3× (yellow card) 4× (suspension)	Report	3× (yellow card) 4× (suspension)	Suwon Gymnasium, Suwon; Referees: Al-Mawt, Ali Marhoon (BHR)

17 March 2017; 14:15	Iran	31–33	Vietnam	Suwon Gymnasium, Suwon; Referees: Al-Mawt, Ali Marhoon (BHR)
17 March 2017; 14:15	Yousefi 7	(11–14)	Trang 13	Suwon Gymnasium, Suwon; Referees: Al-Mawt, Ali Marhoon (BHR)
17 March 2017; 14:15	3× (yellow card) 4× (suspension)	Report	3× (yellow card) 2× (suspension)	Suwon Gymnasium, Suwon; Referees: Al-Mawt, Ali Marhoon (BHR)

17 March 2017; 16:30	South Korea	43–24	China	Suwon Gymnasium, Suwon; Referees: Shimajiri, Ota (JPN)
17 March 2017; 16:30	Choi 9	(21–13)	Qiao 6	Suwon Gymnasium, Suwon; Referees: Shimajiri, Ota (JPN)
17 March 2017; 16:30	1× (yellow card) 1× (suspension)	Report	4× (yellow card) 3× (suspension)	Suwon Gymnasium, Suwon; Referees: Shimajiri, Ota (JPN)

=== Group B ===
Pos	Team	Pld	W	D	L	GF	GA	GD	Pts	Qualification
1	Japan	3	3	0	0	104	37	+67	6	Semifinals
2	Kazakhstan	3	2	0	1	84	63	+21	4	Semifinals
3	Uzbekistan	3	1	0	2	67	93	−26	2	
4	Hong Kong	3	0	0	3	39	101	−62	0	

Rules for classification: 1) points; 2) head-to-head points; 3) head-to-head goal difference; 4) head-to-head number of goals scored; 5) goal difference.

14 March 2017; 14:15	Kazakhstan	35–22	Uzbekistan	Suwon Gymnasium, Suwon; Referees: Lee, Lee (KOR)
14 March 2017; 14:15	Alexandrova 8	(14–13)	Voronina 12	Suwon Gymnasium, Suwon; Referees: Lee, Lee (KOR)
14 March 2017; 14:15	3× (yellow card) 5× (suspension)	Report	3× (yellow card) 4× (suspension)	Suwon Gymnasium, Suwon; Referees: Lee, Lee (KOR)

14 March 2017; 16:30	Japan	37–7	Hong Kong	Suwon Gymnasium, Suwon; Referees: Al-Mawt, Ali Marhoon (BHR)
14 March 2017; 16:30	Kawata 7	(17–5)	Lei 2	Suwon Gymnasium, Suwon; Referees: Al-Mawt, Ali Marhoon (BHR)
14 March 2017; 16:30	3× (yellow card) 1× (suspension)	Report	3× (yellow card) 4× (suspension)	Suwon Gymnasium, Suwon; Referees: Al-Mawt, Ali Marhoon (BHR)

16 March 2017; 14:15	Hong Kong	13–35	Kazakhstan	Suwon Gymnasium, Suwon; Referees: Tavakoli, Valadkhanian (IRI)
16 March 2017; 14:15	Wong 4	(7–15)	five players 4	Suwon Gymnasium, Suwon; Referees: Tavakoli, Valadkhanian (IRI)
16 March 2017; 14:15	3× (yellow card) 5× (suspension)	Report	3× (yellow card) 1× (suspension)	Suwon Gymnasium, Suwon; Referees: Tavakoli, Valadkhanian (IRI)

16 March 2017; 16:30	Uzbekistan	16–39	Japan	Suwon Gymnasium, Suwon; Referees: Al-Zayyat, Awwad (JOR)
16 March 2017; 16:30	Voronina 7	(7–16)	Kawata 10	Suwon Gymnasium, Suwon; Referees: Al-Zayyat, Awwad (JOR)
16 March 2017; 16:30	3× (yellow card) 4× (suspension)	Report	3× (yellow card) 5× (suspension)	Suwon Gymnasium, Suwon; Referees: Al-Zayyat, Awwad (JOR)

18 March 2017; 14:15	Uzbekistan	29–19	Hong Kong	Suwon Gymnasium, Suwon; Referees: Al-Zayyat, Awwad (JOR)
18 March 2017; 14:15	Abdulhamidova 12	(13–10)	Lei 5	Suwon Gymnasium, Suwon; Referees: Al-Zayyat, Awwad (JOR)
18 March 2017; 14:15	3× (yellow card) 8× (suspension)	Report	3× (yellow card) 3× (suspension)	Suwon Gymnasium, Suwon; Referees: Al-Zayyat, Awwad (JOR)

18 March 2017; 16:30	Japan	28–14	Kazakhstan	Suwon Gymnasium, Suwon; Referees: Lee, Lee (KOR)
18 March 2017; 16:30	Kawata, Ohyama 4	(11–11)	Rodina 4	Suwon Gymnasium, Suwon; Referees: Lee, Lee (KOR)
18 March 2017; 16:30	4× (yellow card) 3× (suspension)	Report	3× (yellow card) 3× (suspension)	Suwon Gymnasium, Suwon; Referees: Lee, Lee (KOR)

== Knockout stage ==
=== Bracket ===
Semifinals
20 March
South Korea	41
Kazakhstan	20
20 March
Japan	27
China	26

Final
22 March
South Korea	30
Japan	20
Third place
22 March
Kazakhstan	26
China	34

5–8th place bracket

Semifinals
20 March
Vietnam	30
Hong Kong	24
20 March
Uzbekistan	29
Iran	28

Final
21 March
Vietnam	29
Uzbekistan	41
Third place
21 March
Hong Kong	18
Iran	31

=== 5–8th place semifinals ===
20 March 2017; 12:00	Vietnam	30–24	Hong Kong	Suwon Gymnasium, Suwon; Referees: Lee, Lee (KOR)
20 March 2017; 12:00	Trang 8	(14–10)	Lei 10	Suwon Gymnasium, Suwon; Referees: Lee, Lee (KOR)
20 March 2017; 12:00	2× (yellow card) 3× (suspension)	Report	3× (yellow card) 6× (suspension)	Suwon Gymnasium, Suwon; Referees: Lee, Lee (KOR)

20 March 2017; 14:15	Uzbekistan	29–28	Iran	Suwon Gymnasium, Suwon; Referees: Al-Zayyat, Awwad (JOR)
20 March 2017; 14:15	Voronina 10	(14–11)	Bapiri 7	Suwon Gymnasium, Suwon; Referees: Al-Zayyat, Awwad (JOR)
20 March 2017; 14:15	3× (yellow card) 3× (suspension)	Report	3× (yellow card) 4× (suspension)	Suwon Gymnasium, Suwon; Referees: Al-Zayyat, Awwad (JOR)

=== Semifinals ===
20 March 2017; 16:30	South Korea	41–20	Kazakhstan	Suwon Gymnasium, Suwon; Referees: Shimajiri, Ota (JPN)
20 March 2017; 16:30	three players 7	(20–10)	Tankina 4	Suwon Gymnasium, Suwon; Referees: Shimajiri, Ota (JPN)
20 March 2017; 16:30	2× (yellow card)	Report	3× (yellow card) 3× (suspension)	Suwon Gymnasium, Suwon; Referees: Shimajiri, Ota (JPN)

20 March 2017; 18:45	Japan	27–26	China	Suwon Gymnasium, Suwon; Referees: Al-Mawt, Ali Marhoon (BHR)
20 March 2017; 18:45	Ohyama 8	(12–12)	Meng 7	Suwon Gymnasium, Suwon; Referees: Al-Mawt, Ali Marhoon (BHR)
20 March 2017; 18:45	3× (yellow card) 5× (suspension)	Report	2× (yellow card) 5× (suspension)	Suwon Gymnasium, Suwon; Referees: Al-Mawt, Ali Marhoon (BHR)

=== Seventh place game ===
21 March 2017; 14:15	Hong Kong	18–31	Iran	Suwon Gymnasium, Suwon; Referees: Shimajiri, Ota (JPN)
21 March 2017; 14:15	Lai 4	(7–14)	Bapiri 7	Suwon Gymnasium, Suwon; Referees: Shimajiri, Ota (JPN)
21 March 2017; 14:15	3× (yellow card) 3× (suspension)	Report	3× (yellow card) 1× (suspension)	Suwon Gymnasium, Suwon; Referees: Shimajiri, Ota (JPN)

=== Fifth place game ===
21 March 2017; 16:30	Vietnam	29–41	Uzbekistan	Suwon Gymnasium, Suwon; Referees: Tavakoli, Valadkhanian (IRI)
21 March 2017; 16:30	Trang 9	(13–17)	Dilbaarhon 10	Suwon Gymnasium, Suwon; Referees: Tavakoli, Valadkhanian (IRI)
21 March 2017; 16:30	3× (yellow card) 5× (suspension)	Report	3× (yellow card) 7× (suspension)	Suwon Gymnasium, Suwon; Referees: Tavakoli, Valadkhanian (IRI)

=== Third place game ===
22 March 2017; 14:15	Kazakhstan	26–34	China	Suwon Gymnasium, Suwon; Referees: Lee, Lee (KOR)
22 March 2017; 14:15	Abilda 6	(12–16)	Zhang 8	Suwon Gymnasium, Suwon; Referees: Lee, Lee (KOR)
22 March 2017; 14:15	3× (yellow card) 2× (suspension)	Report	3× (yellow card) 3× (suspension)	Suwon Gymnasium, Suwon; Referees: Lee, Lee (KOR)

=== Final ===
22 March 2017; 16:30	South Korea	30–20	Japan	Suwon Gymnasium, Suwon; Referees: Al-Mawt, Ali Marhoon (BHR)
22 March 2017; 16:30	Kim 7	(11–15)	Nakayama 5	Suwon Gymnasium, Suwon; Referees: Al-Mawt, Ali Marhoon (BHR)
22 March 2017; 16:30	2× (yellow card) 2× (suspension)	Report	3× (yellow card) 3× (suspension)	Suwon Gymnasium, Suwon; Referees: Al-Mawt, Ali Marhoon (BHR)

== Final standing ==
Rank	Team
1st place, gold medalist(s)	South Korea
2nd place, silver medalist(s)	Japan
3rd place, bronze medalist(s)	China
4	Kazakhstan
5	Uzbekistan
6	Vietnam
7	Iran
8	Hong Kong

Team qualified for the 2017 World Women's Handball Championship
