= Chen Qian =

Chen Qian may refer to:

- Chen Qian (Jin dynasty) (陳騫), courtesy name Xiuyuan, Jin dynasty military general
- Emperor Wen of Chen (522–566), named Chen Qian, emperor of the Chen dynasty
- Chen Qian (handballer) (born 1990), female Chinese handballer
- Chen Qian (pentathlete) (born 1987), female Chinese modern pentathlete
- Chen Qian (swimmer) (born 1993), female Chinese swimmer

== See also ==
- Qian Chen (professor), Chinese-American scientist
