= Asuka Fujita =

Japanese handball player (born 1996)

Personal information
- Nationality: Japanese
- Born: 14 February 1996 (age 30) Osaka, Japan
- Height: 1.66 m (5 ft 5 in)

Sport
- Sport: Handball
- Position: Right wing
- Current club: Gloria Bistrița-Năsăud
- Number: 27

Senior clubs
- Years: Team
- 2014–2018: Sony Semiconductor Manufacturing
- 2018–2020: Borussia Dortmund
- 2020–2022: Minaur Baia Mare
- 2022–2023: SCM Râmnicu Vâlcea
- 2023–: CS Gloria Bistrița-Năsăud (handball)
National team
Years	Team	Apps	(Gls)
2017–	Japan	38	(100)
Medal record
Women's handball
Representing Japan
Asian Games
Silver medal – second place	2026 Aichi–Nagoya	Team
Bronze medal – third place	2018 Jakarta	Team
Asian Championship
Silver medal – second place	2017 South Korea
Silver medal – second place	2018 Japan

Asuka Fujita (藤田 明日香, Fujita Asuka; born 14 February 1996) is a Japanese professional handballer who plays as a right wing for Liga Națională club Gloria Bistrița-Năsăud and the Japan national team.

== Achievements ==
- Handball-Bundesliga:
  - Winner: 2020
- Asian Championship:
  - Silver Medalist: 2017, 2018
- Asian Games:
  - Bronze Medalist: 2018
