= Han Mi-seul =

South Korean handball player (born 1993)

Personal information
- Nationality: South Korean
- Born: 13 August 1993 (age 33)
- Height: 1.77 m (5 ft 10 in)

Sport
- Sport: Handball
- Position: Left back
- Current club: Wonderful Samcheok
National team
Years	Team	Apps
–	South Korea	14
Medal record
Women's handball
Representing South Korea
Asian Games
Gold medal – first place	2018 Jakarta	Team
Gold medal – first place	2026 Aichi–Nagoya	Team
Asian Championship
Gold medal – first place	2018 Japan

Han Mi-seul (Korean: 한미슬, born 13 August 1993) is a South Korean handball player for Wonderful Samcheok and the South Korean national team.

She competed at the 2015 World Women's Handball Championship in Denmark.
