= Won Seon-pil =

South Korean handball player (born 1994)

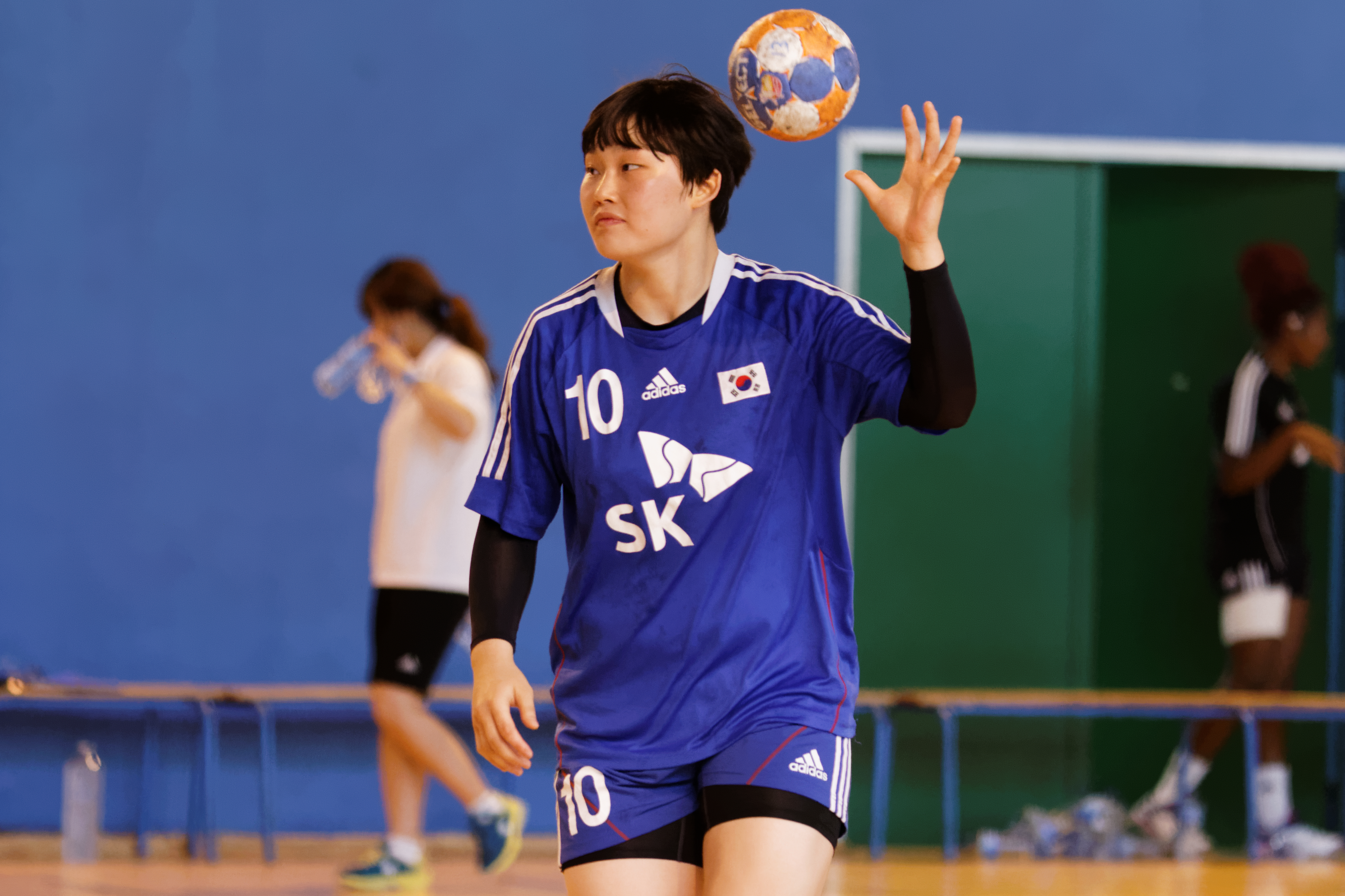

Personal information
- Nationality: South Korean
- Born: 6 August 1994 (age 32) Jeongseon, South Korea
- Height: 1.74 m (5 ft 9 in)

Sport
- Sport: Handball
- Position: Pivot
- Current club: Busan Infrastructure Corporation

Senior clubs
- Years: Team
- –: Incheon Sports Council
- -2024: Gwangju Metropolitan City Corporation
- 2024-: Busan Infrastructure Corporation
National team
Years	Team	Apps
–	South Korea	13
Medal record
Asian Games
Gold medal – first place	2014 Incheon
Asian Championship
Gold medal – first place	2017 South Korea
Gold medal – first place	2022 South Korea
Junior World Championship
Gold medal – first place	2014 Croatia
- Won Seon-pil
- Hangul: 원선필
- RR: Won Seonpil
- MR: Wŏn Sŏnp'il

Won Seon-pil (born 6 August 1994) is a South Korean handball player for Busan Infrastructure Corporation and the South Korean Republic national team.

== Club handball ==
Won started her career at Incheon Sports Council, and later joined Gwangju Metropolitan City Corporation. In 2024 she joined Busan Infrastructure Corporation.

== National team ==
She represented South Korea at the 2013 World Women's Handball Championship.

A year later she won a gold medal at the 2014 Women's Junior World Handball Championship in Croatia as the team captain, and was chosen for the tournament all-star team. Later the same year she won a gold medal at the 2014 Asian Games.

At the 2017 Asian Chmpionship she won another gold medal with Korea, qualifying them for the 2017 World Women's Handball Championship.

She also represented Korea at the 2020 Olympics.

In 2022 she won her second Asian Championship.
