= Xiaoling =

Xiaoling may refer to the following from China:

- Deng Xiaoling (邓小玲; born 1974), female softball player who competed at the 2000 and 2004 Summer Olympics
- Lan Xiaoling (born 1993), Chinese team handball player
- Luo Xiaoling (born 1988), Chinese professional racing cyclist
- Ming Xiaoling Mausoleum (明孝陵), the tomb of the Hongwu Emperor, the founder of the Ming Dynasty, in Nanjing
- Qing Xiaoling Mausoleum (清孝陵), the tomb of the Shunzhi Emperor, one of the Eastern Qing tombs near Beijing
- Zhang Xiaoling (张小玲; born 1957), female Paralympic table tennis player
