= Yang Yurou =

Chinese handball player (born 1996)

Personal information
- Nationality: Chinese
- Born: 16 July 1996 (age 30) Anhui, China
- Height: 1.85 m (6 ft 1 in)

Sport
- Sport: Handball
- Position: Goalkeeper
- Current club: Anhui Handball
National team
Years	Team	Apps	(Gls)
–	China	77	(5)
Medal record
Asian Games
Silver medal – second place	2018 Jakarta	Team
Bronze medal – third place	2022 Hangzhou	Team
Asian Championship
Bronze medal – third place	2018 Japan

Yang Yurou (Chinese: 杨雨柔, born 16 July 1996) is a Chinese handball player for Anhui Handball and the Chinese national team.

She competed at the 2015 World Women's Handball Championship in Denmark.

== Achievements ==
- Norwegian League:
  - Winner: 2019/2020
- Norwegian Cup:
  - Winner: 2019
