= Kang Eun-hye =

South Korean handball player (born 1996)

Personal information
- Nationality: South Korean
- Born: 17 April 1996 (age 30) Seoul, South Korea
- Height: 1.86 m (6 ft 1 in)

Sport
- Sport: Handball
- Position: Pivot
- Current club: Busan
National team
Years	Team	Apps
–	South Korea	16
Medal record
Women's handball
Representing South Korea
Asian Games
Gold medal – first place	2018 Jakarta	Team
Gold medal – first place	2026 Aichi–Nagoya	Team
Silver medal – second place	2022 Hangzhou	Team
Asian Championship
Gold medal – first place	2018 Japan
Gold medal – first place	2022 South Korea
Youth Olympic Games
Gold medal – first place	2014 Nanjing	Team

Kang Eun-hye (Korean: 강은혜, born 17 April 1996) is a South Korean handball player for Busan and the South Korean national team.

She participated at the 2017 World Women's Handball Championship, 2014 Summer Youth Olympics, 2020 Summer Olympics, 2024 Summer Olympics, 2018 Asian Games, 2022 Asian Games, and 2015 Summer Universiade.
