= Kapralov =

Kapralov (Russian: Капралов) is a Russian masculine surname, its feminine counterpart is Kapralova. Notable people with the surname include:

- Andrey Kapralov (born 1980), Russian swimmer
- Kristina Kapralova (born 1995), Kazakhstani handball player
- Vítězslava Kaprálová (1915–40), Czech composer
