= Yelena Klimenko =

Kazakhstani handball player

Personal information
- Nationality: Kazakhstani
- Born: April 30, 1991 (age 35)
- Height: 167 cm (66 in)

Sport
- Sport: Handball

Senior clubs
- Years: Team
- –: Astana HC
National team
- Years: Team
- –: Kazakhstan
Medal record
Asian Games
Bronze medal – third place	2014 Incheon

Yelena Klimenko (Елена Александровна Клименко, born 30 April 1991) is a handball player from Kazakhstan. She plays on the Kazakhstan women's national handball team, and participated at the 2011 World Women's Handball Championship in Brazil.
