= Liu Xiaomei =

Liu Xiaomei may refer to:

- Liu Xiaomei (athlete) (born 1972), Chinese sprinter
- Liu Xiaomei (handballer) (born 1985), Chinese handball player
