= Si Wen =

Chinese handball player (born 1990)

Personal information
- Nationality: Chinese
- Born: 14 December 1990 (age 35)
- Height: 1.71 m (5 ft 7 in)

Sport
- Sport: Handball
- Position: Right wing
- Current club: Shanghai
National team
Years	Team	Apps	(Gls)
–	China	30	(18)
Medal record
Asian Games
Silver medal – second place	2018 Jakarta	Team

Si Wen (born 14 December 1990) is a Chinese handball player for Shanghai and the Chinese national team. She participated at the 2017 World Women's Handball Championship.
