= Minami Itano =

Japanese handball player (born 1993)

Personal information
- Nationality: Japanese
- Born: 2 February 1993 (age 33)
- Height: 1.73 m (5 ft 8 in)

Sport
- Sport: Handball
- Position: Goalkeeper
- Current club: Hiroshima Maple Reds
National team
Years	Team	Apps	(Gls)
–	Japan	6	(0)
Medal record
Asian Games
Bronze medal – third place	2018 Indonesia	Team
Asian Championship
Silver medal – second place	2018 Japan

Minami Itano (板野陽, Itano Minami; born 2 February 1993) is a Japanese handball player for Hiroshima Maple Reds and the Japanese national team.

She participated at the 2017 World Women's Handball Championship.
