= Yang Jiao =

Chinese handball player (born 1994)

Personal information
- Nationality: Chinese
- Born: 7 September 1994 (age 32)
- Height: 1.85 m (6 ft 1 in)

Sport
- Sport: Handball
- Position: Left back
- Current club: Liaoning Handball
National team
Years	Team	Apps	(Gls)
–	China	60	(100)
Medal record
Asian Games
Silver medal – second place	2018 Jakarta	Team
Asian Championship
Bronze medal – third place	2018 Japan

Yang Jiao (Chinese: 杨娇, born 7 September 1994) is a Chinese handball player. She plays for the club Liaoning Handball and on the Chinese national team. She represented China at the 2013 World Women's Handball Championship in Serbia, where the Chinese team placed 18th.
