= Jin Mengqing =

Chinese handball player (born 1995)

Personal information
- Nationality: Chinese
- Born: 29 May 1995 (age 31)
- Height: 1.72 m (5 ft 8 in)

Sport
- Sport: Handball
- Position: Centre back
- Current club: Jiangsu Handball
National team
Years	Team	Apps	(Gls)
–	China	75	(180)
Medal record
Asian Games
Bronze medal – third place	2022 Hangzhou	Team
Asian Championship
Bronze medal – third place	2018 Japan
Bronze medal – third place	2022 South Korea
- Updated on 27 November 2023

Jin Mengqing (Chinese: 金梦青, born 29 May 1995) is a Chinese handball player for Jiangsu Handball and the Chinese national team.

She competed at the 2015 World Women's Handball Championship in Denmark and at the 2023 World Women's Handball Championship in Scandinavia.
