= Park Sae-young =

South Korean handball player (born 1994)

Personal information
- Nationality: South Korean
- Born: 11 August 1994 (age 32) Seoul, South Korea
- Height: 1.76 m (5 ft 9 in)

Sport
- Sport: Handball
- Position: Goalkeeper
- Current club: Wonderful Samcheok

Senior clubs
- Years: Team
- –: Gyeong
- –: Wonderful Samcheok
National team
| Years | Team | Apps | (Gls) |
| – | South Korea | 26 | (0) |
Medal record
Women's handball
Representing South Korea
Asian Games
| Gold medal – first place | 2014 Incheon | Team |
| Gold medal – first place | 2018 Indonesia | Team |
| Gold medal – first place | 2026 Aichi–Nagoya | Team |
| Silver medal – second place | 2022 Hangzhou | Team |
Asian Championship
| Gold medal – first place | 2018 Japan |
| Gold medal – first place | 2022 South Korea |
| Silver medal – second place | 2024 India |
Junior World Championship
| Gold medal – first place | 2014 Croatia |
- Updated on 27 November 2025

Park Sae-young (Korean: 박새영, born 11 August 1994) is a South Korean handball player for Wonderful Samcheok and the South Korean national team.

She participated at the 2017 World Women's Handball Championship, the 2024 Summer Olympics, and the 2014 Asian Games, 2018 Asian Games, and 2022 Asian Games.
