= Ju Hui =

South Korean handball player (born 1989)

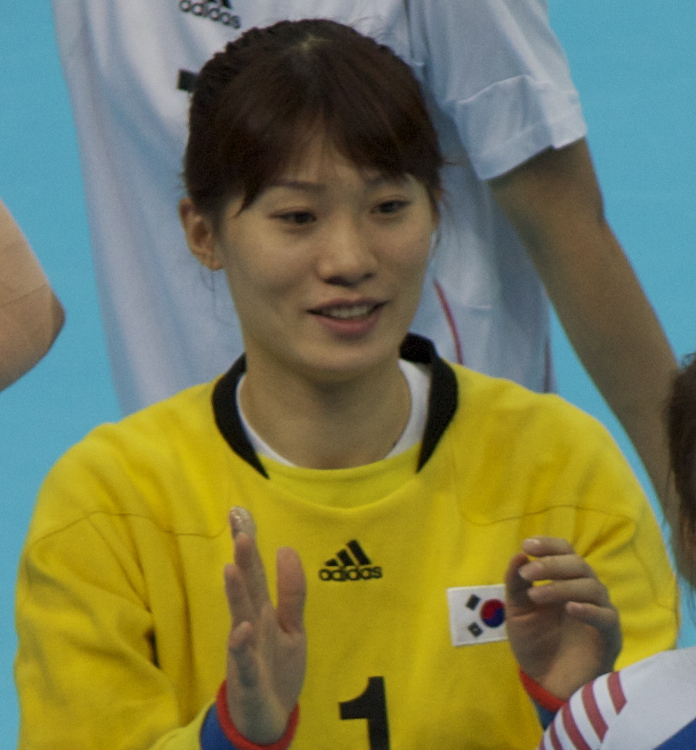

Personal information
- Nationality: South Korean
- Born: 4 November 1989 (age 36) Seoul, South Korea
- Height: 1.81 m (5 ft 11 in)

Sport
- Sport: Handball
- Position: Goalkeeper
- Current club: Seoul City
National team
- Years: Team
- –: South Korea
Medal record
Asian Championship
Gold medal – first place	2018 Japan

- Ju Hui
- Hangul: 주희
- Hanja: 朱喜
- RR: Ju Hui
- MR: Chu Hŭi

Ju Hui (born 4 November 1989) is a Korean handball goalkeeper for Seoul City and the South Korean national team.

She participated at the 2011 World Women's Handball Championship in Brazil and the 2012 Summer Olympics. She also participated in the 2017 World Women's Handball Championship.
