= Kim Seon-hwa =

South Korean handball player (born 1991)

Personal information
- Nationality: South Korean
- Born: 7 January 1991 (age 35) Seoul, South Korea
- Height: 1.60 m (5 ft 3 in)

Sport
- Sport: Handball
- Position: Right wing
- Current club: SK Sugar Gliders
- Number: 2
National team
Years	Team	Apps
–	South Korea	16
Medal record
Asian Games
Gold medal – first place	2014 Incheon	Team
Gold medal – first place	2018 Indonesia	Team
Silver medal – second place	2022 Hangzhou	Team
Asian Championship
Gold medal – first place	2021 Jordan

- Kim Seon-hwa
- Hangul: 김선화
- Hanja: 金善貨
- RR: Gim Seonhwa
- MR: Kim Sŏnhwa

Kim Seon-Hwa (Korean: 김선화; born 7 January 1991) is a South Korean handball player for SK Sugar Gliders and the South Korean national team.

She participated at the 2011 World Women's Handball Championship in Brazil and at the 2013 World Women's Handball Championship in Serbia.
