= Yu So-jeong =

South Korean handball player (born 1996)

Personal information
- Nationality: South Korean
- Born: 4 June 1996 (age 30)
- Height: 1.68 m (5 ft 6 in)

Sport
- Sport: Handball
- Position: Right back
- Current club: SK Sugar Gliders
- Number: 29
National team
Years	Team	Apps	(Gls)
–	South Korea	19	(71)
Medal record
Asian Games
Gold medal – first place	2018 Indonesia	Team
Asian Championship
Gold medal – first place	2018 Japan
Junior World Championship
Gold medal – first place	2014 Croatia

Yu So-jeong (Korean: 유소정; born 4 June 1996) is a South Korean handball player for SK Sugar Gliders and the South Korean national team.

She competed at the 2015 World Women's Handball Championship in Denmark, the 2017 World Women's Handball Championship in Germany and the 2019 World Women's Handball Championship in Japan.

She also competed at the 2016 Olympics.
