= Jung Yu-ra =

South Korean handball player (born 1992)

Personal information
- Nationality: South Korean
- Born: 6 February 1992 (age 34) Seoul, South Korea
- Height: 1.70 m (5 ft 7 in)

Sport
- Sport: Handball
- Position: Right wing
- Current club: Colorful Daegu

Senior clubs
- Years: Team
- 2010-: Colorful Daegu
National team
Years	Team	Apps	(Gls)
2011-	South Korea	59	(170)
Medal record
Asian Championship
Gold medal – first place	2018 Japan
Gold medal – first place	2021 Jordan
Asian Games
Gold medal – first place	2014 Incheon	Team
Gold medal – first place	2018 Jakarta	Team
- Jung Yu-ra
- Hangul: 정유라
- RR: Jeong Yura
- MR: Chŏng Yura

Jung Yu-ra (born 6 February 1992), also known at Jeong Yu-ra or Jung Yura, is a South Korean handball player for Colorful Daegu and the South Korean national team.

== Career ==
Internationally, Jung has represented South Korea several times at the Summer Olympics. Her team placed fourth in 2012, tenth in 2016, and eight at the 2020 Summer Olympics. She was also part of the Korean team that won gold medals at the 2014 Asian Games, and another gold at the 2018 Asian Games.
