= Yu Yuanyuan =

Chinese handball player (born 1995)

Personal information
- Nationality: Chinese
- Born: 30 January 1995 (age 31)
- Height: 1.72 m (5 ft 8 in)

Sport
- Sport: Handball
- Position: Left wing
- Current club: Jiangsu
National team
Years	Team	Apps	(Gls)
–	China	57	(112)
Medal record
Asian Games
Silver medal – second place	2018 Jakarta	Team

Yu Yuanyuan (Chinese: 于源源, born 30 January 1995) is a Chinese handball player for Jiangsu and the Chinese national team.

She represented China at the 2013 World Women's Handball Championship in Serbia, where the Chinese team placed 18th.
