= Rasheed Yusuff =

Qatari handball player (born 1994)

Personal information
- Nationality: Qatari
- Born: 16 October 1994 (age 32)
- Height: 1.89 m (6 ft 2 in)

Sport
- Sport: Handball
- Position: Goalkeeper
- Current club: Al Sadd
- Number: 1
National team
Years	Team	Apps	(Gls)
–	Qatar	74	(0)
Medal record
Men's handball
Representing Qatar
Asian Games
Gold medal – first place	2018 Jakarta	Team
Asian Championship
Gold medal – first place	2022 Saudi Arabia
Islamic Solidarity Games
Gold medal – first place	2021 Konya

Rasheed Yusuff (born 16 October 1994) is a Qatari handball player for Al Sadd and the Qatari national team.

He represented Qatar at the 2019 World Men's Handball Championship. He was part of the Qatari team that won gold medals at the 2018 Asian Games in Jakarta.
