= Yuki Tanabe =

Japanese handball player (born 1989)

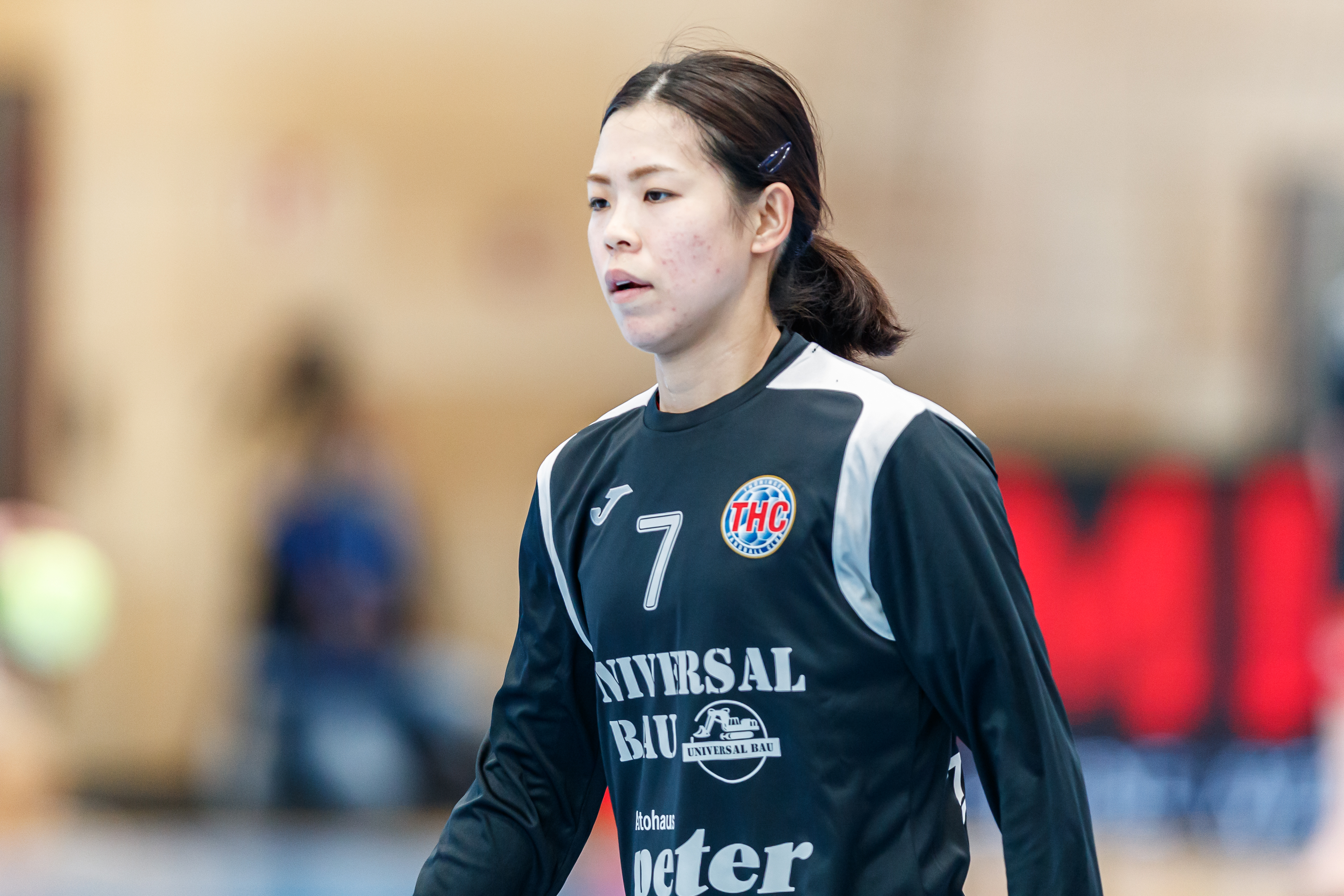

Personal information
- Nationality: Japanese
- Born: 25 August 1989 (age 37)
- Height: 1.70 m (5 ft 7 in)

Sport
- Sport: Handball
- Position: Left wing
- Current club: Hokkoku Bank

Senior clubs
- Years: Team
- 2012–2014: Hokkoku Bank
- 2014–2016: Fehérvár KC
- 2016–: Hokkoku Bank
National team
Years	Team	Apps	(Gls)
–	Japan	67	(186)
Medal record
Asian Championship
Silver medal – second place	2018 Japan

Yuki Tanabe (田邉 夕貴, Tanabe Yuki; born 25 August 1989) is a Japanese handballer for Hokkoku Bank and the Japanese national team.

She represented her country at the 2013 World Women's Handball Championship in Serbia.
