= Wu Yin (handballer) =

Chinese handball player (born 1988)

Personal information
- Nationality: Chinese
- Born: 13 April 1988 (age 38)
- Height: 1.75 m (5 ft 9 in)

Sport
- Sport: Handball
- Position: Right back
- Current club: Shanghai Club
National team
Years	Team	Apps	(Gls)
–	China	55	(75)
Medal record
Asian Games
Silver medal – second place	2018 Jakarta	Team

Wu Yin (Chinese: 吴茵; pinyin: Wú Yīn; born 13 April 1988) is a Chinese team handball player. She plays on the Chinese national team, and participated at the 2009 World Women's Handball Championship at home, as well as the 2011 World Women's Handball Championship in Brazil.
