= Kaho Sunami =

Japanese handball player (born 1993)

Personal information
- Nationality: Japanese
- Born: 5 January 1993 (age 33)
- Height: 1.66 m (5 ft 5 in)

Sport
- Sport: Handball
- Position: Pivot
- Current club: Sony Semiconductor
National team
Years	Team	Apps	(Gls)
–	Japan	39	(69)
Medal record
Asian Championship
Silver medal – second place	2018 Japan

Kaho Sunami (角南果帆, Sunami Kaho; born 5 January 1993) is a Japanese handball player for Sony Semiconductor and the Japanese national team.

She participated at the 2017 World Women's Handball Championship.
