= Sha Zhengwen =

Chinese handball player (born 1990)

Personal information
- Nationality: Chinese
- Born: 18 June 1990 (age 36)
- Height: 1.90 m (6 ft 3 in)

Sport
- Sport: Handball
- Position: Pivot
- Current club: Shanghai
National team
Years	Team	Apps	(Gls)
–	China	100	(130)
Medal record
Asian Games
Gold medal – first place	2010 Guangzhou	Team
Silver medal – second place	2018 Jakarta	Team

Sha Zhengwen (Chinese: 沙正文; born 18 June 1990) is a Chinese handball player for Shanghai and the Chinese national team.

She participated at the 2011 World Women's Handball Championship in Brazil.
