= Wu Nana =

Chinese handball player (born 1990)

Personal information
- Nationality: Chinese
- Born: 4 March 1990 (age 36)
- Height: 1.70 m (5 ft 7 in)

Sport
- Sport: Handball
- Position: Left wing
- Current club: Shanghai
National team
Years	Team	Apps	(Gls)
–	China	80	(65)
Medal record
Asian Games
Silver medal – second place	2018 Jakarta	Team

Wu Nana (Chinese: 吴娜娜, born 4 March 1990) is a Chinese handball player for Shanghai and the Chinese national team.

She participated at the 2011 World Women's Handball Championship in Brazil.
