= Lan Xiaoling =

Chinese handball player (born 1993)

Personal information
- Nationality: Chinese
- Born: 22 May 1993 (age 33)
- Height: 1.81 m (5 ft 11 in)

Sport
- Sport: Handball
- Position: Left back
National team
- Years: Team
- –: China
Medal record
Asian Games
Silver medal – second place	2018 Jakarta	Team
Asian Championship
Bronze medal – third place	2018 Japan

Lan Xiaoling (Chinese: 蓝小玲, born 22 May 1993) is a Chinese handball player. She plays on the Chinese national team, and participated at the 2009 World Women's Handball Championship at home, as well as the 2011 World Women's Handball Championship in Brazil.
