= Viktoriya Kolotinskaya =

Kazakhstani handball player

Personal information
- Nationality: Kazakhstani
- Born: 10 March 1995 (age 31)
- Height: 1.75 m (5 ft 9 in)

Sport
- Sport: Handball
- Position: Left wing
- Current club: Seikhun-KAM Handball
National team
Years	Team	Apps	(Gls)
–	Kazakhstan	10	(61)
Medal record
Asian Games
Bronze medal – third place	2014 Incheon
Asian Championship
Bronze medal – third place	2021 Jordan

Viktoriya Kolotinskaya (Виктория Викторовна Колотинская; born 10 March 1995) is a Kazakhstani handball player. She plays for the club Seikhun-KAM Handball and is member of the Kazakhstani national team. She competed at the 2015 World Women's Handball Championship in Denmark.
