= Natalya Ilyina =

Kazakhstani handball player

Personal information
- Nationality: Kazakhstani
- Born: October 27, 1985 (age 40)
- Height: 175 cm (69 in)

Sport
- Sport: Handball

Senior clubs
- Years: Team
- –: Kazygurt
- –: Astana
National team
- Years: Team
- –: Kazakhstan
Medal record
Asian Games
Bronze medal – third place	2014 Incheon

Natalya Ilyina (Наталья Александровна Ильина, née Kulakova, born 27 October 1985) is a team handball player from Kazakhstan. She has played on the Kazakhstan women's national handball team, and played at the 2007 World Women's Handball Championship, which was Kazakhstan's first ever participation. They finished 18th of 24.

She also participated at the 2011 World Women's Handball Championship in Brazil. She used to be the wife of Kazakhstan Olympic champion in weightlifting Ilya Ilyin, but divorced him in 2017.
