= Anri Matsumura =

Japanese handball player (born 1991)

Personal information
- Nationality: Japanese
- Born: 21 June 1991 (age 35)
- Height: 1.68 m (5 ft 6 in)

Sport
- Sport: Handball
- Position: Left wing
- Current club: Sony Semiconductor
National team
Years	Team	Apps	(Gls)
–	Japan	20	(87)

Anri Matsumura (松村 杏里, Matsumura Anri; born 21 June 1991) is a Japanese handball player for Sony Semiconductor and the Japanese national team.

She competed at the 2015 World Women's Handball Championship in Denmark.
