= Yelena Suyazova =

Kazakhstani handball player

Personal information
- Nationality: Kazakhstani
- Born: 15 June 1989 (age 37)
- Height: 187 cm (74 in)

Sport
- Sport: Handball

Senior clubs
- Years: Team
- –: HC Almaty
National team
- Years: Team
- –: Kazakhstan
Medal record
Asian Games
Bronze medal – third place	2014 Incheon

Yelena Suyazova (Russian: Елена Олеговна Суязова; born 15 June 1989) is a handball player from Kazakhstan. She has played on the Kazakhstan women's national handball team, and participated at the 2011 World Women's Handball Championship in Brazil.
