= Li Yao =

Chinese handball player (born 1992)

Personal information
- Nationality: Chinese
- Born: 7 June 1992 (age 34)
- Height: 1.73 m (5 ft 8 in)

Sport
- Sport: Handball
- Position: Centre back
- Current club: Anhui Handball
National team
Years	Team	Apps	(Gls)
–	China	200	(430)
Medal record
Asian Games
Gold medal – first place	2010 Guangzhou	Team
Silver medal – second place	2018 Jakarta	Team

Li Yao (Chinese: 李瑶, born 7 June 1992) is a Chinese handball player. She plays on the Chinese national team, and participated at the 2011 World Women's Handball Championship in Brazil.
