= Anastassiya Rodina =

Kazakhstani handball player

Personal information
- Nationality: Kazakhstani
- Born: 30 June 1991 (age 35)
- Height: 1.78 m (5 ft 10 in)

Sport
- Sport: Handball
- Position: Pivot
- Current club: Almaty Region Handball
National team
Years	Team	Apps	(Gls)
–	Kazakhstan	10	(47)
Medal record
Asian Games
Bronze medal – third place	2014 Incheon

Anastassiya Rodina (born 30 June 1991) is a Kazakhstani handball player. She plays for the club Almaty Region Handball and is member of the Kazakhstani national team. She competed at the 2015 World Women's Handball Championship in Denmark.
