= Irina Danilova =

Kazakhstani handball player

Personal information
- Nationality: Kazakhstani
- Born: 17 December 1993 (age 32)
- Height: 1.85 m (6 ft 1 in)

Sport
- Sport: Handball
- Position: Goalkeeper
- Current club: Almaty Handball
National team
Years	Team	Apps	(Gls)
–	Kazakhstan	8	(0)
Medal record
Asian Games
Bronze medal – third place	2014 Incheon

Irina Danilova (Ирина Игоревна Данилова, born 17 December 1993) is a Kazakhstani handball player who plays for the club Almaty Handball. She is member of the Kazakhstani national team. She competed at the 2015 World Women's Handball Championship in Denmark.
