= Qiao Ru =

Chinese handball player (born 1995)

Personal information
- Nationality: Chinese
- Born: 5 January 1995 (age 31)
- Height: 1.83 m (6 ft 0 in)

Sport
- Sport: Handball
- Position: Pivot
- Current club: Jiangsu
National team
| Years | Team | Apps | (Gls) |
| – | China | 90 | (171) |
Medal record
Asian Games
| Silver medal – second place | 2018 Jakarta | Team |
Asian Championship
| Bronze medal – third place | 2018 Japan |

Qiao Ru (born 5 January 1995) is a Chinese handball player for Jiangsu and the Chinese national team.

She competed at the 2015 World Women's Handball Championship in Denmark.
