= Zhao Jiaqin =

Chinese handball player (born 1986)

Personal information
- Nationality: Chinese
- Born: 22 January 1986 (age 40)
- Height: 1.74 m (5 ft 9 in)

Sport
- Sport: Handball
- Position: Centre back
- Current club: Jiangsu Handball
National team
Years	Team	Apps	(Gls)
–	China	225	(1000)
Medal record
Asian Games
Gold medal – first place	2010 Guangzhou	Team
Silver medal – second place	2018 Jakarta	Team

Zhao Jiaqin (Chinese: 赵佳芹, born 22 January 1986) is a Chinese handball player. She plays on the Chinese national team and participated at the 2009 World Women's Handball Championship at home, as well as the 2011 World Women's Handball Championship in Brazil and 2013 World Women's Handball Championship in Serbia.
