= Qian Chen (professor) =

Chinese-American medical scientist

Qian Chen is a Chinese-American medical scientist who is currently the Michael G. Ehrlich Endowed Chair Professor in Orthopaedic Research at the Alpert Medical School, a part of Brown University.
