= Zhou Lei (handballer) =

Chinese handball player (born 1994)

Personal information
- Nationality: Chinese
- Born: 25 October 1994 (age 31)
- Height: 1.70 m (5 ft 7 in)

Sport
- Sport: Handball
- Position: Right wing
- Current club: Shanghai Handball
National team
Years	Team	Apps	(Gls)
–	China	22	(37)

Zhou Lei (born 25 October 1994) is a Chinese handball player for Shanghai Handball and the Chinese national team.

She represented China at the 2019 World Women's Handball Championship in Japan, where the Chinese team placed 23rd.
