= Hitomi Tada =

Japanese handball player (born 1991)

Personal information
- Nationality: Japanese
- Born: 13 October 1991 (age 35)
- Height: 1.66 m (5 ft 5 in)

Sport
- Sport: Handball
- Position: Right back
- Current club: MIE violet' IRIS
National team
Years	Team	Apps	(Gls)
–	Japan	31	(51)
Medal record
Asian Championship
Silver medal – second place	2018 Japan

Hitomi Tada (born 13 October 1991) is a Japanese handball player for MIE violet' IRIS and the Japanese national team.

She participated at the 2017 World Women's Handball Championship.
