= Shiori Nagata =

Japanese handball player (born 1987)

Personal information
- Nationality: Japanese
- Born: 24 October 1987 (age 38) Fukuoka, Japan
- Height: 1.72 m (5 ft 8 in)

Sport
- Sport: Handball
- Position: Pivot
- Current club: Omron
National team
Years	Team	Apps	(Gls)
–	Japan	103	(88)
Medal record
Asian Championship
Silver medal – second place	2018 Japan
Silver medal – second place	2021 Jordan

Shiori Nagata (born 24 October 1987) is a Japanese handball player for Omron and the Japanese national team.

She participated at the 2011 World Women's Handball Championship in Brazil, and at the 2013 World Women's Handball Championship in Serbia.
