= Chen Qian (handballer) =

Chinese handball player (born 1990)

Personal information
- Nationality: Chinese
- Born: 26 January 1990 (age 36)
- Height: 1.73 m (5 ft 8 in)

Sport
- Sport: Handball
- Position: Left wing
- Current club: Anhui Club
National team
| Years | Team | Apps | (Gls) |
| – | China | 16 | (18) |

Chen Qian (born 26 January 1990) is a Chinese team handball player. She plays for the Anhui HC, and on the Chinese national team. She represented China at the 2013 World Women's Handball Championship in Serbia, where the Chinese team placed 18th.
