= Malaysia women's national handball team =

Malaysia

Information
- Association: Malaysia Handball Association

Colours
1st	2nd
- Last updated on Unknown.

The Malaysia women's national handball team is the national women's handball team of Malaysia and is controlled by the Malaysia Handball Association. It made its first appearance at the Asian Games in 2018.
