= Kristina Radayeva =

Kazakhstani handball player (born 1995)

Kristina Kapralova
Personal information
- Nationality: Kazakhstani
- Born: 4 January 1995 (age 31)
- Height: 1.54 m (5 ft 1 in)

Sport
- Sport: Handball
- Position: Right back
- Current club: WHC Gjorche Petrov

Senior clubs
- Years: Team
- –: Kazygurt Handball
- –: WHC Gjorche Petrov
National team
Years	Team	Apps	(Gls)
–	Kazakhstan	79	(183)
Medal record
Asian Championship
Bronze medal – third place	2024 India
Asian Games
Bronze medal – third place	2014 Incheon

Kristina Radayeva (Кристина Андреевна Радаева, née Kapralova, born 4 January 1995) is a Kazakhstani handball player. She plays for the Macedonian club WHC Gjorche Petrov and is member of the Kazakhstani national team. She competed at the 2015 World Women's Handball Championship in Denmark.
