= Zhang Haixia =

Chinese handball player (born 1995)

Personal information
- Nationality: Chinese
- Born: 10 February 1995 (age 31)
- Height: 1.74 m (5 ft 9 in)

Sport
- Sport: Handball
- Position: Right wing
- Current club: Jiangsu
National team
Years	Team	Apps	(Gls)
–	China	97	(197)
Medal record
Asian Games
Silver medal – second place	2018 Jakarta	Team
Bronze medal – third place	2022 Hangzhou	Team
Asian Championship
Bronze medal – third place	2022 South Korea

Zhang Haixia (Chinese: 张海侠, born 10 February 1995) is a Chinese handball player for Jiangsu and the Chinese national team.

She represented China at the 2013 World Women's Handball Championship in Serbia, where the Chinese team placed 18th.
