= Mana Ohyama =

Japanese handball player (born 1992)

Personal information
- Nationality: Japanese
- Born: 7 December 1992 (age 33)
- Height: 1.65 m (5 ft 5 in)

Sport
- Sport: Handball
- Position: Centre back
- Current club: Hokkoku Bank
National team
Years	Team	Apps	(Gls)
–	Japan	39	(93)
Medal record
Asian Championship
Silver medal – second place	2018 Japan

Mana Ohyama (大山 真奈, Ōyama Mana; born 7 December 1992) is a Japanese handball player for Hokkoku Bank and the Japanese national team.

She participated at the 2017 World Women's Handball Championship.

== Achievements ==
- Carpathian Trophy:
  - Bronze Medalist: 2019

== Individual awards ==
- Carpathian Trophy Fair Play Award: 2019
