= Natsumi Akiyama =

Japanese handball player (born 1994)

Personal information
- Nationality: Japanese
- Born: 23 July 1994 (age 32) Kyōto, Japan
- Height: 1.62 m (5 ft 4 in)

Sport
- Sport: Handball
- Position: Right wing
- Current club: Aranmare Toyama
- Number: 32

Senior clubs
- Years: Team
- 2017-2022: Hokkoku Bank
- 2022-2024: Kisvárdai KC
- 2024-2025: Szombathelyi KKA
- 2025-: Aranmare Toyama
National team
Years	Team	Apps	(Gls)
–	Japan	47	(107)
Medal record
Asian Championship
Gold medal – first place	2024 India
- Updated on 26 October 2025

Natsumi Akiyama (born 23 July 1994) is a Japanese handball player for Aranmare Toyama and the Japanese national team.

She has previously played for the Hungarian clubs Kisvárdai KC and Szombathelyi KKA, as well as Hokkoku Bank in Japan.

She represented Japan at the 2019 World Women's Handball Championship. She represented Japan again at the 2025 World Championship.

At the 2024 Asian Championship she won gold medals with the Japanese team.
