= Park Mi-ra =

South Korean handball player (born 1987)

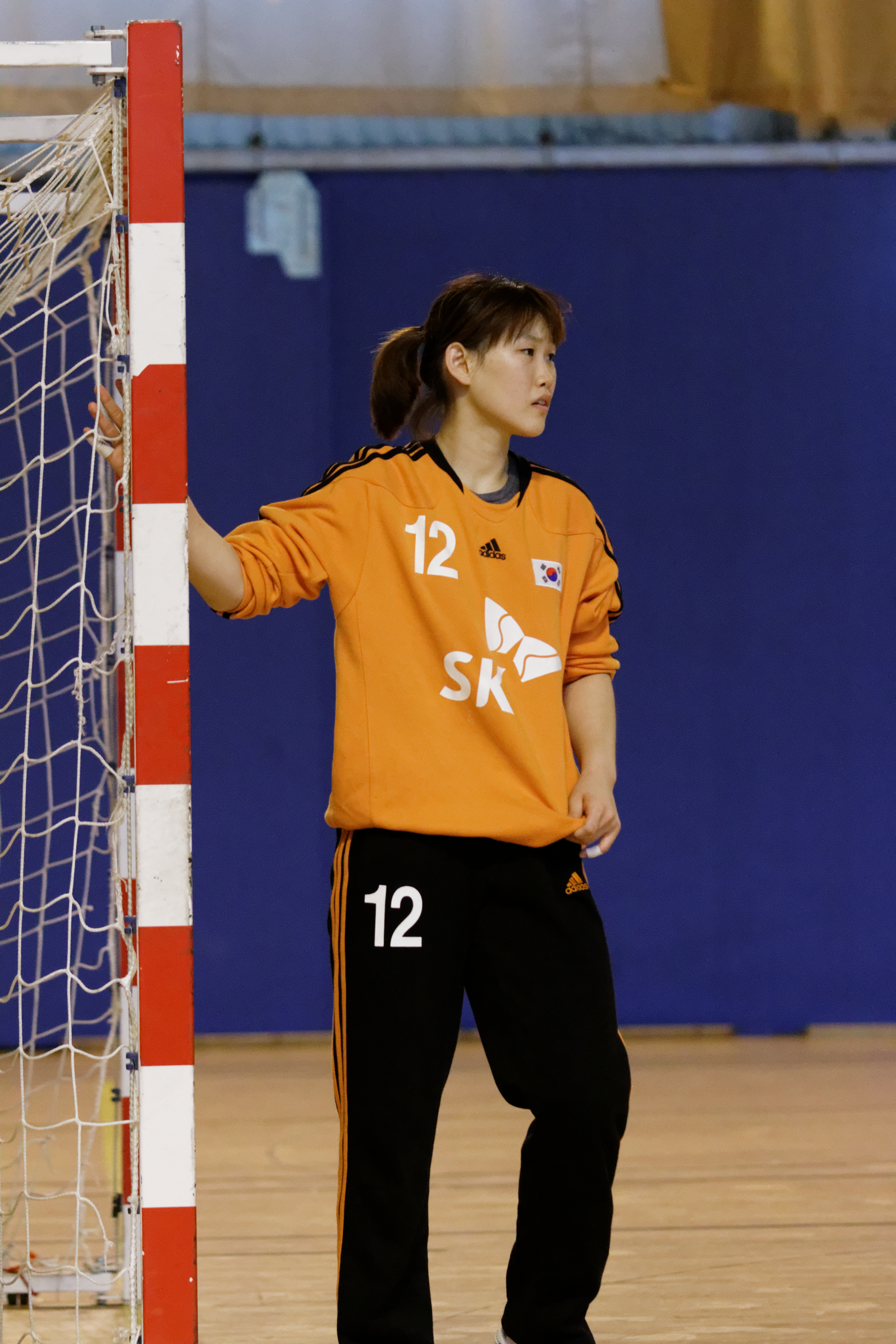

Personal information
- Nationality: South Korean
- Born: 20 April 1987 (age 39) Daegu, South Korea
- Height: 1.73 m (5 ft 8 in)

Sport
- Sport: Handball
- Position: Goalkeeper
- Current club: Wonderful Samcheok
National team
Years	Team	Apps	(Gls)
–	South Korea	38	(0)
Medal record
Asian Games
Gold medal – first place	2014 Incheon	Team
Gold medal – first place	2018 Jakarta	Team

- Park Mi-ra
- Hangul: 박미라
- RR: Bak Mira
- MR: Pak Mira

Park Mi-ra (born 20 April 1987) is a South Korean handball player for Wonderful Samcheok and the South Korean Republic national team. As part of the Korean team she competed at the 2013 World Women's Handball Championship in Serbia, the 2015 World Women's Handball Championship in Denmark and the 2016 Summer Olympics in Rio de Janeiro.
