= Dana Abilda =

Kazakhstani handball player

Personal information
- Nationality: Kazakhstani
- Born: 18 October 1996 (age 30)
- Height: 1.67 m (5 ft 6 in)

Sport
- Sport: Handball
- Position: Pivot
- Current club: Érd HC
National team
Years	Team	Apps	(Gls)
–	Kazakhstan	60	(367)
Medal record
Asian Championship
Bronze medal – third place	2024 India

Dana Abilda (born 18 October 1996) is a Kazakhstani handball player for Érd HC and the Kazakhstani national team.

She competed at the 2015 World Women's Handball Championship in Denmark.
