= Mayuko Ishitate =

Japanese handball player (born 1987)

Personal information
- Nationality: Japanese
- Born: 18 January 1987 (age 39) Fukui, Japan
- Height: 1.67 m (5 ft 6 in)

Sport
- Sport: Handball
- Position: Centre back
- Current club: MIE violet' IRIS
- Number: 20

Senior clubs
- Years: Team
- 2009–2014: Omron Corporation
- 2014–2017: Fehérvár KC
- 2017–: MIE violet' IRIS
National team
Years	Team	Apps	(Gls)
–	Japan	94	(195)

Mayuko Ishitate (石立 真悠子, Ishitate Mayuko; born 18 January 1987) is a Japanese handballer for MIE violet' IRIS and the Japanese national team.

She participated at the 2011 World Women's Handball Championship in Brazil and the 2013 World Women's Handball Championship in Serbia.
