= Irina Alexandrova =

Kazakhstani handball player

Personal information
- Nationality: Kazakhstani
- Born: 2 October 1994 (age 32)
- Height: 1.83 m (6 ft 0 in)

Sport
- Sport: Handball
- Position: Left back
- Current club: USC Dostyk
National team
Years	Team	Apps	(Gls)
–	Kazakhstan	77	(448)
Medal record
Asian Games
Bronze medal – third place	2014 Incheon

Irina Alexandrova (born 2 October 1994) is a Kazakhstani handball player for USC Dostyk and the Kazakhstani national team.

She competed at the 2015 World Women's Handball Championship in Denmark.
