= Choi Su-min =

South Korean handball player (born 1990)

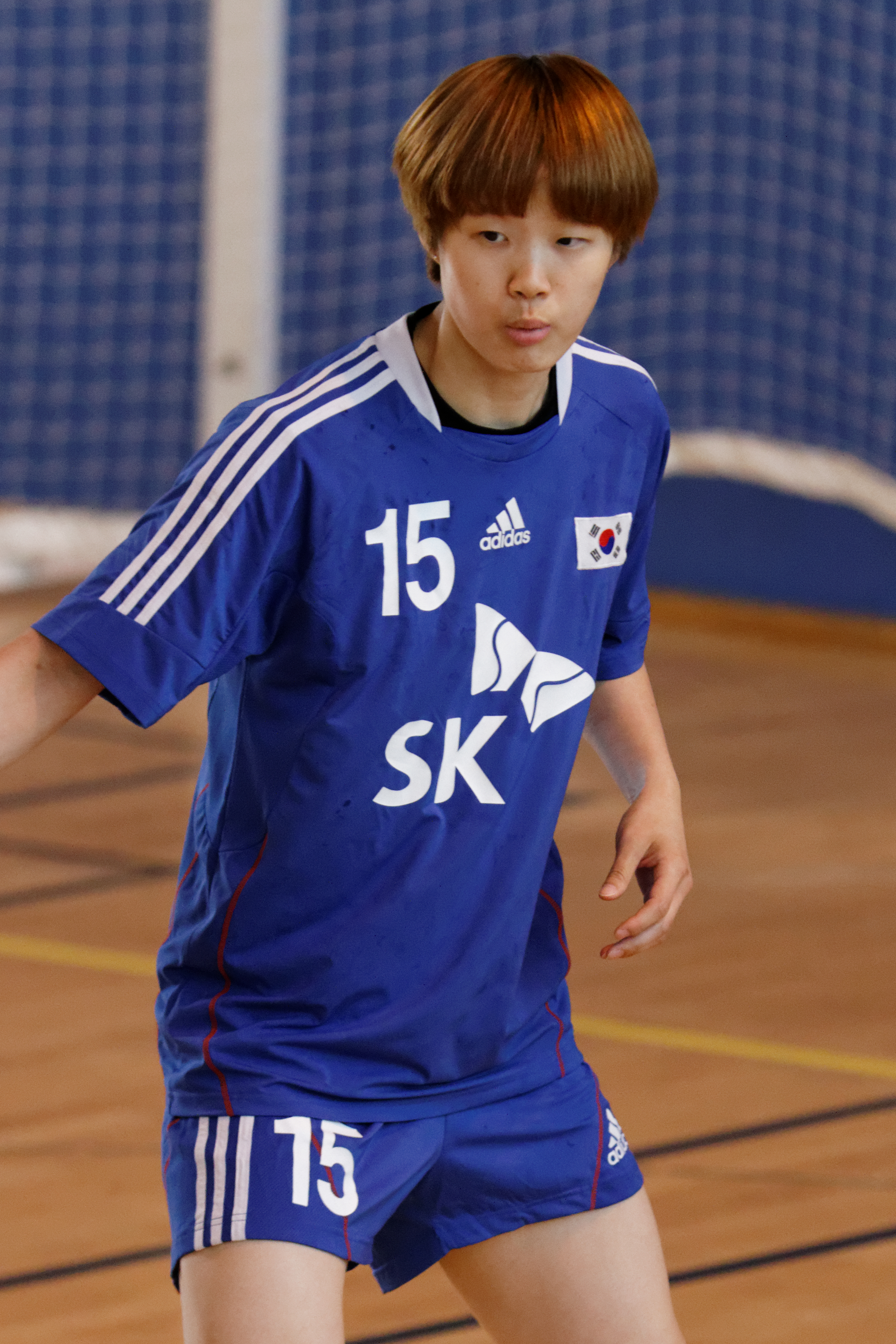

Personal information
- Nationality: South Korean
- Born: 9 January 1990 (age 36)
- Height: 1.78 m (5 ft 10 in)

Sport
- Sport: Handball
- Position: Left wing
- Current club: Seoul City
National team
Years	Team	Apps	(Gls)
–	South Korea	49	(155)
Medal record
Asian Games
Gold medal – first place	2014 Incheon	Team
Gold medal – first place	2018 Jakarta	Team

- Choi Su-min
- Hangul: 최수민
- RR: Choe Sumin
- MR: Ch'oe Sumin

Choi Su-min (born 9 January 1990) is a South Korean handball player for Seoul City and the South Korean Republic national team.
