= Nozomi Hara =

Japanese handball player (born 1991)

Personal information
- Nationality: Japanese
- Born: 9 March 1991 (age 35)
- Height: 1.70 m (5 ft 7 in)

Sport
- Sport: Handball
- Position: Centre back
- Current club: MIE violet' IRIS
National team
Years	Team	Apps	(Gls)
–	Japan	45	(102)
Medal record
Asian Championship
Silver medal – second place	2018 Japan

Nozomi Hara (原 希美, Hara Nozomi; born 9 March 1991) is a Japanese handball player for Mie Violet'Iris and the Japanese national team.

She represented Japan at the 2013 World Women's Handball Championship in Serbia, where the Japanese placed 14th.
