= Aya Yokoshima =

Japanese handball player (born 1990)

Personal information
- Nationality: Japanese
- Born: 3 July 1990 (age 36)
- Height: 1.63 m (5 ft 4 in)

Sport
- Sport: Handball
- Position: Centre back
- Current club: Hokkoku Bank Handball Team
National team
Years	Team	Apps	(Gls)
–	Japan	20	(58)
Medal record
Asian Championship
Silver medal – second place	2018 Japan

Aya Yokoshima (横嶋 彩, Yokoshima Aya; born 3 July 1990) is a Japanese handball player for Hokkoku Bank Handball Team and the Japanese national team.

She competed at the 2015 World Women's Handball Championship in Denmark.
