= Chie Katsuren =

Japanese handball player (born 1989)

Personal information
- Nationality: Japanese
- Born: 14 April 1989 (age 37) Okinawa, Japan
- Height: 1.59 m (5 ft 3 in)

Sport
- Sport: Handball
- Position: Left wing
- Current club: Omron
National team
Years	Team	Apps	(Gls)
–	Japan	59	(135)
Medal record
Asian Championship
Silver medal – second place	2018 Japan
Silver medal – second place	2021 Jordan

Chie Katsuren (born 14 April 1989) is a Japanese handball player for Omron and the Japanese national team.
