= Yoo Hyun-ji =

South Korean handball player (born 1984)

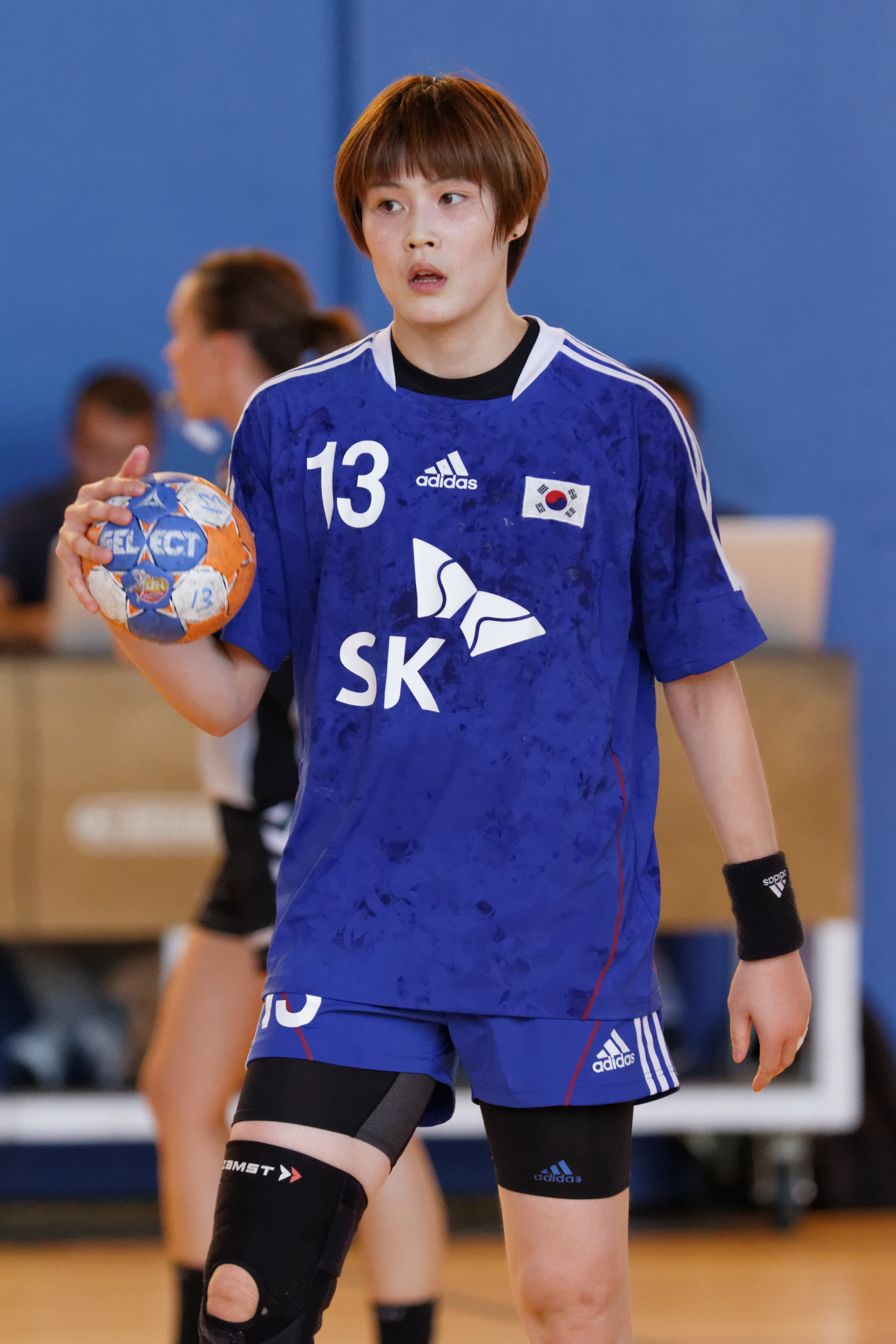

Personal information
- Nationality: South Korean
- Born: 16 July 1984 (age 42) Incheon, South Korea
- Height: 1.75 m (5 ft 9 in)

Sport
- Sport: Handball
- Position: Pivot
- Current club: Wonderful Samcheok
National team
Years	Team	Apps	(Gls)
–	South Korea	89	(111)

- Yoo Hyun-ji
- Hangul: 유현지
- RR: Yu Hyeonji
- MR: Yu Hyŏnji

Yoo Hyun-ji (born 16 July 1984) is a South Korean handball player for Wonderful Samcheok and the South Korean Republic national team.
