= Tomomi Kawata =

Japanese handball player (born 1998)

Personal information
- Nationality: Japanese
- Born: 30 June 1998 (age 28)
- Height: 1.61 m (5 ft 3 in)

Sport
- Sport: Handball
- Position: Left back
- Current club: Hokkoku Bank
National team
Years	Team	Apps	(Gls)
–	Japan	27	(100)

Tomomi Kawata (born 30 June 1998) is a Japanese handball player for Hokkoku Bank and the Japanese national team.

She represented Japan at the 2019 World Women's Handball Championship.
