= Olga Tankina =

Kazakhstani handball player (born 1994)

Personal information
- Nationality: Kazakhstani
- Born: 20 January 1994 (age 32)
- Height: 1.82 m (6 ft 0 in)

Sport
- Sport: Handball
- Position: Right wing
- Current club: Almaty Handball
National team
Years	Team	Apps	(Gls)
–	Kazakhstan	10	(110)
Medal record
Asian Games
Bronze medal – third place	2014 Incheon

Olga Tankina (Ольга Николаевна Танкина, born 20 January 1994) is a Kazakhstani handball player who plays for the club Almaty Handball. She is member of the Kazakhstani national team and competed at the 2015 World Women's Handball Championship in Denmark.
