= 2018 Asian Women's Handball Championship =

Tournament details
- Host country: Japan
- Venues: 3 (in 3 host cities)
- Dates: 30 November – 9 December
- Teams: 10 (from 1 confederation)

Final positions
- Champions: South Korea (14th title)
- Runners-up: Japan
- Third place: China
- Fourth place: Kazakhstan

Tournament statistics
- Matches played: 29
- Goals scored: 1,438 (49.59 per match)
- Attendance: 24,707 (852 per match)
- Top scorers: (Australia) Sally Potocki (57 goals)

The 2018 Asian Women's Handball Championship was the 17th edition of the Asian Women's Handball Championship, which took place from 30 November to 9 December 2018 in Kumamoto, Yamaga and Yatsushiro, Japan. The tournament was held under the aegis of Asian Handball Federation and acted as the Asian qualifying tournament for the 2019 World Women's Handball Championship.

South Korea won their fourth straight and 14th overall title after defeating Japan in the final.

== Draw ==
The draw was held on 6 August 2018 at the Hotel Nikko in Kumamoto.

Teams were seeded according to the AHF COC regulations and rankings of the previous edition of the championship. Teams who had not participate in the previous edition were in Pot 4.

Pot 1	Pot 2	Pot 3	Pot 4
South Korea; Japan	China; Kazakhstan	Iran; Hong Kong	Australia; New Zealand; India; Singapore

== Preliminary round ==
All times are local (UTC+9).

=== Group A ===
Pos	Team	Pld	W	D	L	GF	GA	GD	Pts	Qualification
1	Japan (H)	4	4	0	0	140	55	+85	8	Semifinals
2	Kazakhstan	4	3	0	1	148	95	+53	6	Semifinals
3	Australia	4	2	0	2	99	105	−6	4	5–8th place semifinals
4	Iran	4	1	0	3	96	120	−24	2	5–8th place semifinals
5	New Zealand	4	0	0	4	50	158	−108	0	9th place game

Source: AHF
Rules for classification: 1) points; 2) head-to-head points; 3) head-to-head goal difference; 4) head-to-head number of goals scored; 5) goal difference.
(H) Hosts

30 November 2018; 16:45	Australia	24–32	Kazakhstan	Yatsushiro Gymnasium, Yatsushiro; Attendance: 800; Referees: Lee, Lee (KOR)
30 November 2018; 16:45	Potocki 12	(15–15)	three players 7	Yatsushiro Gymnasium, Yatsushiro; Attendance: 800; Referees: Lee, Lee (KOR)
30 November 2018; 16:45	3× (yellow card)	Report	3× (yellow card) 1× (suspension)	Yatsushiro Gymnasium, Yatsushiro; Attendance: 800; Referees: Lee, Lee (KOR)

30 November 2018; 19:00	New Zealand	5–41	Japan	Yatsushiro Gymnasium, Yatsushiro; Attendance: 1,500; Referees: Antić, Jakovljević (SRB)
30 November 2018; 19:00	Anastasiou 3	(2–20)	Tanabe 9	Yatsushiro Gymnasium, Yatsushiro; Attendance: 1,500; Referees: Antić, Jakovljević (SRB)
30 November 2018; 19:00	1× (yellow card) 5× (suspension)	Report	1× (yellow card) 2× (suspension)	Yatsushiro Gymnasium, Yatsushiro; Attendance: 1,500; Referees: Antić, Jakovljević (SRB)

1 December 2018; 13:45	Iran	26–41	Kazakhstan	Yatsushiro Gymnasium, Yatsushiro; Attendance: 360; Referees: Al-Mawt, Marhoon (BHR)
1 December 2018; 13:45	Rajabi 6	(12–18)	Abilda 10	Yatsushiro Gymnasium, Yatsushiro; Attendance: 360; Referees: Al-Mawt, Marhoon (BHR)
1 December 2018; 13:45	1× (yellow card) 4× (suspension)	Report	3× (yellow card) 2× (suspension)	Yatsushiro Gymnasium, Yatsushiro; Attendance: 360; Referees: Al-Mawt, Marhoon (BHR)

1 December 2018; 16:00	Australia	18–37	Japan	Yatsushiro Gymnasium, Yatsushiro; Attendance: 1,500; Referees: Cheng, Zhou (CHN)
1 December 2018; 16:00	Potocki 8	(8–19)	Katsuren 8	Yatsushiro Gymnasium, Yatsushiro; Attendance: 1,500; Referees: Cheng, Zhou (CHN)
1 December 2018; 16:00	1× (yellow card) 4× (suspension)	Report	2× (yellow card) 2× (suspension)	Yatsushiro Gymnasium, Yatsushiro; Attendance: 1,500; Referees: Cheng, Zhou (CHN)

2 December 2018; 13:45	Kazakhstan	51–14	New Zealand	Yatsushiro Gymnasium, Yatsushiro; Attendance: 500; Referees: Cheng, Zhou (CHN)
2 December 2018; 13:45	Abilda, Khardina 8	(26–5)	Anastasiou 6	Yatsushiro Gymnasium, Yatsushiro; Attendance: 500; Referees: Cheng, Zhou (CHN)
2 December 2018; 13:45	2× (yellow card) 1× (suspension)	Report	2× (yellow card) 3× (suspension)	Yatsushiro Gymnasium, Yatsushiro; Attendance: 500; Referees: Cheng, Zhou (CHN)

2 December 2018; 16:00	Australia	29–24	Iran	Yatsushiro Gymnasium, Yatsushiro; Attendance: 400; Referees: Lee, Lee (KOR)
2 December 2018; 16:00	Potocki 12	(12–11)	Janbaz 6	Yatsushiro Gymnasium, Yatsushiro; Attendance: 400; Referees: Lee, Lee (KOR)
2 December 2018; 16:00	1× (yellow card) 4× (suspension)	Report	3× (yellow card) 4× (suspension) 1× (red card)	Yatsushiro Gymnasium, Yatsushiro; Attendance: 400; Referees: Lee, Lee (KOR)

4 December 2018; 16:45	New Zealand	12–28	Australia	Yamaga Gymnasium, Yamaga; Attendance: 500; Referees: Cheng, Zhou (CHN)
4 December 2018; 16:45	Hazelton 4	(3–15)	Mouncey 6	Yamaga Gymnasium, Yamaga; Attendance: 500; Referees: Cheng, Zhou (CHN)
4 December 2018; 16:45	2× (yellow card) 5× (suspension)	Report	2× (yellow card)	Yamaga Gymnasium, Yamaga; Attendance: 500; Referees: Cheng, Zhou (CHN)

4 December 2018; 19:00	Iran	8–31	Japan	Yamaga Gymnasium, Yamaga; Attendance: 1,700; Referees: Al-Mawt, Marhoon (BHR)
4 December 2018; 19:00	Baperi 3	(5–15)	Yokoshima 7	Yamaga Gymnasium, Yamaga; Attendance: 1,700; Referees: Al-Mawt, Marhoon (BHR)
4 December 2018; 19:00	3× (yellow card) 3× (suspension)	Report	2× (yellow card) 2× (suspension)	Yamaga Gymnasium, Yamaga; Attendance: 1,700; Referees: Al-Mawt, Marhoon (BHR)

5 December 2018; 16:45	New Zealand	19–38	Iran	Yamaga Gymnasium, Yamaga; Attendance: 500
5 December 2018; 16:45	Anastasiou 7	(10–20)	Baperi 6	Yamaga Gymnasium, Yamaga; Attendance: 500
5 December 2018; 16:45	1× (yellow card) 5× (suspension)	Report	3× (yellow card) 1× (suspension)	Yamaga Gymnasium, Yamaga; Attendance: 500

5 December 2018; 19:00	Japan	31–24	Kazakhstan	Yamaga Gymnasium, Yamaga; Attendance: 1,550
5 December 2018; 19:00	Tanabe 9	(14–11)	Alexandrova, Tankina 6	Yamaga Gymnasium, Yamaga; Attendance: 1,550
5 December 2018; 19:00	4× (yellow card) 2× (suspension)	Report	1× (yellow card) 4× (suspension)	Yamaga Gymnasium, Yamaga; Attendance: 1,550

=== Group B ===
Pos	Team	Pld	W	D	L	GF	GA	GD	Pts	Qualification
1	South Korea	4	4	0	0	139	57	+82	8	Semifinals
2	China	4	3	0	1	121	53	+68	6	Semifinals
3	Hong Kong	4	2	0	2	82	114	−32	4	5–8th place semifinals
4	India	4	1	0	3	73	113	−40	2	5–8th place semifinals
5	Singapore	4	0	0	4	45	123	−78	0	9th place game

Source: AHF
Rules for classification: 1) points; 2) head-to-head points; 3) head-to-head goal difference; 4) head-to-head number of goals scored; 5) goal difference.

30 November 2018; 16:45	Singapore	7–35	China	Yamaga Gymnasium, Yamaga; Attendance: 700; Referees: Hizaki, Ikebuchi (JPN)
30 November 2018; 16:45	Ham, Leow 2	(2–15)	Tian, Zhou 5	Yamaga Gymnasium, Yamaga; Attendance: 700; Referees: Hizaki, Ikebuchi (JPN)
30 November 2018; 16:45		Report		Yamaga Gymnasium, Yamaga; Attendance: 700; Referees: Hizaki, Ikebuchi (JPN)

30 November 2018; 19:00	India	10–37	South Korea	Yamaga Gymnasium, Yamaga; Attendance: 600; Referees: Shimajiri, Ota (JPN)
30 November 2018; 19:00	Menika 4	(5–17)	three players 7	Yamaga Gymnasium, Yamaga; Attendance: 600; Referees: Shimajiri, Ota (JPN)
30 November 2018; 19:00	2× (yellow card) 4× (suspension)	Report	2× (yellow card) 3× (suspension)	Yamaga Gymnasium, Yamaga; Attendance: 600; Referees: Shimajiri, Ota (JPN)

1 December 2018; 13:45	Hong Kong	10–36	China	Yamaga Gymnasium, Yamaga; Attendance: 600; Referees: Mousavian, Kolahdouzan (IRN)
1 December 2018; 13:45	Wu 4	(2–16)	Liang 8	Yamaga Gymnasium, Yamaga; Attendance: 600; Referees: Mousavian, Kolahdouzan (IRN)
1 December 2018; 13:45	2× (yellow card) 1× (suspension)	Report	3× (yellow card) 3× (suspension)	Yamaga Gymnasium, Yamaga; Attendance: 600; Referees: Mousavian, Kolahdouzan (IRN)

1 December 2018; 16:00	Singapore	9–41	South Korea	Yamaga Gymnasium, Yamaga; Attendance: 700; Referees: Antić, Jakovljević (SRB)
1 December 2018; 16:00	Chan, Wan 3	(1–24)	Lee M. 10	Yamaga Gymnasium, Yamaga; Attendance: 700; Referees: Antić, Jakovljević (SRB)
1 December 2018; 16:00	1× (yellow card) 2× (suspension)	Report		Yamaga Gymnasium, Yamaga; Attendance: 700; Referees: Antić, Jakovljević (SRB)

2 December 2018; 13:45	China	29–12	India	Yamaga Gymnasium, Yamaga; Attendance: 800
2 December 2018; 13:45	Jin 7	(16–4)	Menika 6	Yamaga Gymnasium, Yamaga; Attendance: 800
2 December 2018; 13:45	1× (yellow card) 3× (suspension)	Report	2× (yellow card) 2× (suspension)	Yamaga Gymnasium, Yamaga; Attendance: 800

2 December 2018; 16:00	Singapore	12–25	Hong Kong	Yamaga Gymnasium, Yamaga; Attendance: 711
2 December 2018; 16:00	Wan 4	(7–13)	Wong Y. 5	Yamaga Gymnasium, Yamaga; Attendance: 711
2 December 2018; 16:00	5× (suspension)	Report	2× (yellow card) 1× (suspension)	Yamaga Gymnasium, Yamaga; Attendance: 711

4 December 2018; 16:45	Hong Kong	17–37	South Korea	Yatsushiro Gymnasium, Yatsushiro; Attendance: 250; Referees: Mousavian, Kolahdouzan (IRI)
4 December 2018; 16:45	Cheung Me. 4	(7–19)	Jung 10	Yatsushiro Gymnasium, Yatsushiro; Attendance: 250; Referees: Mousavian, Kolahdouzan (IRI)
4 December 2018; 16:45	1× (yellow card) 4× (suspension)	Report	1× (yellow card) 1× (suspension)	Yatsushiro Gymnasium, Yatsushiro; Attendance: 250; Referees: Mousavian, Kolahdouzan (IRI)

4 December 2018; 19:00	India	22–17	Singapore	Yatsushiro Gymnasium, Yatsushiro; Attendance: 300; Referees: Lee, Lee (KOR)
4 December 2018; 19:00	Anumit, H. Kaur 5	(13–7)	Wan 8	Yatsushiro Gymnasium, Yatsushiro; Attendance: 300; Referees: Lee, Lee (KOR)
4 December 2018; 19:00	3× (yellow card) 3× (suspension)	Report	1× (yellow card) 1× (suspension)	Yatsushiro Gymnasium, Yatsushiro; Attendance: 300; Referees: Lee, Lee (KOR)

5 December 2018; 16:45	South Korea	24–21	China	Yatsushiro Gymnasium, Yatsushiro; Attendance: 700; Referees: Antić, Jakovljević (SRB)
5 December 2018; 16:45	Jung 8	(14–12)	Jin, Zhou 4	Yatsushiro Gymnasium, Yatsushiro; Attendance: 700; Referees: Antić, Jakovljević (SRB)
5 December 2018; 16:45	1× (yellow card) 1× (suspension)	Report	1× (yellow card) 5× (suspension)	Yatsushiro Gymnasium, Yatsushiro; Attendance: 700; Referees: Antić, Jakovljević (SRB)

5 December 2018; 19:00	India	29–30	Hong Kong	Yatsushiro Gymnasium, Yatsushiro; Referees: Shimajiri, Ota (JPN)
5 December 2018; 19:00	Menika 10	(15–18)	Cheung Me. 8	Yatsushiro Gymnasium, Yatsushiro; Referees: Shimajiri, Ota (JPN)
5 December 2018; 19:00	2× (suspension)	Report	3× (suspension)	Yatsushiro Gymnasium, Yatsushiro; Referees: Shimajiri, Ota (JPN)

== Knockout stage ==
=== Bracket ===
Semifinals
7 December
South Korea	31
Kazakhstan	23
7 December
Japan	23
China	21

Final
9 December
South Korea	30
Japan	25
Third place
9 December
Kazakhstan	21
China	27

5–8th place bracket

5–8th place semifinals
7 December
Australia	31
India	27
7 December
Hong Kong	17
Iran	19

Fifth place
8 December
Australia	30
Iran	24
Seventh place
8 December
India	27
Hong Kong	31

=== 5–8th place semifinals ===
7 December 2018; 12:30	Australia	31–27	India	Kumamoto Prefectural Gymnasium, Kumamoto; Attendance: 139; Referees: Al-Mawt, Marhoon (BHR)
7 December 2018; 12:30	Potocki 13	(16–13)	Prachi 7	Kumamoto Prefectural Gymnasium, Kumamoto; Attendance: 139; Referees: Al-Mawt, Marhoon (BHR)
7 December 2018; 12:30	3× (yellow card) 5× (suspension)	Report	2× (yellow card) 8× (suspension)	Kumamoto Prefectural Gymnasium, Kumamoto; Attendance: 139; Referees: Al-Mawt, Marhoon (BHR)

7 December 2018; 14:30	Hong Kong	17–19	Iran	Kumamoto Prefectural Gymnasium, Kumamoto; Attendance: 650; Referees: Shimajiri, Ota (JPN)
7 December 2018; 14:30	Cheung Me. 5	(7–10)	Janbaz 5	Kumamoto Prefectural Gymnasium, Kumamoto; Attendance: 650; Referees: Shimajiri, Ota (JPN)
7 December 2018; 14:30	1× (yellow card) 2× (suspension)	Report		Kumamoto Prefectural Gymnasium, Kumamoto; Attendance: 650; Referees: Shimajiri, Ota (JPN)

=== Semifinals ===
7 December 2018; 16:45	South Korea	31–23	Kazakhstan	Kumamoto Prefectural Gymnasium, Kumamoto; Attendance: 830; Referees: Mousavian, Kolahdouzan (IRI)
7 December 2018; 16:45	Shin 9	(14–13)	Abilda 6	Kumamoto Prefectural Gymnasium, Kumamoto; Attendance: 830; Referees: Mousavian, Kolahdouzan (IRI)
7 December 2018; 16:45	3× (yellow card) 4× (suspension)	Report	2× (yellow card) 2× (suspension)	Kumamoto Prefectural Gymnasium, Kumamoto; Attendance: 830; Referees: Mousavian, Kolahdouzan (IRI)

7 December 2018; 19:00	Japan	23–21	China	Kumamoto Prefectural Gymnasium, Kumamoto; Attendance: 1,380; Referees: Antić, Jakovljević (SRB)
7 December 2018; 19:00	Hara 8	(11–11)	Jin 9	Kumamoto Prefectural Gymnasium, Kumamoto; Attendance: 1,380; Referees: Antić, Jakovljević (SRB)
7 December 2018; 19:00	1× (yellow card) 4× (suspension)	Report	3× (yellow card) 2× (suspension)	Kumamoto Prefectural Gymnasium, Kumamoto; Attendance: 1,380; Referees: Antić, Jakovljević (SRB)

=== Ninth place game ===
7 December 2018; 10:30	New Zealand	18–20	Singapore	Kumamoto Prefectural Gymnasium, Kumamoto; Attendance: 500; Referees: Cheng, Zhou (CHN)
7 December 2018; 10:30	Mair 5	(5–10)	Gan, Wan 5	Kumamoto Prefectural Gymnasium, Kumamoto; Attendance: 500; Referees: Cheng, Zhou (CHN)
7 December 2018; 10:30	2× (yellow card) 2× (suspension)	Report	2× (yellow card) 5× (suspension)	Kumamoto Prefectural Gymnasium, Kumamoto; Attendance: 500; Referees: Cheng, Zhou (CHN)

=== Seventh place game ===
8 December 2018; 13:45	India	27–31	Hong Kong	Kumamoto Prefectural Gymnasium, Kumamoto; Attendance: 500; Referees: Lee, Lee (KOR)
8 December 2018; 13:45	Prachi 7	(15–17)	Cheung Me. 6	Kumamoto Prefectural Gymnasium, Kumamoto; Attendance: 500; Referees: Lee, Lee (KOR)
8 December 2018; 13:45	2× (yellow card) 4× (suspension)	Report	3× (yellow card) 3× (suspension)	Kumamoto Prefectural Gymnasium, Kumamoto; Attendance: 500; Referees: Lee, Lee (KOR)

=== Fifth place game ===
8 December 2018; 16:00	Australia	30–24	Iran	Kumamoto Prefectural Gymnasium, Kumamoto; Attendance: 550; Referees: Hizaki, Ikebuchi (JPN)
8 December 2018; 16:00	Guignard 10	(13–12)	Fallahi 7	Kumamoto Prefectural Gymnasium, Kumamoto; Attendance: 550; Referees: Hizaki, Ikebuchi (JPN)
8 December 2018; 16:00	1× (yellow card) 3× (suspension)	Report	1× (yellow card) 7× (suspension)	Kumamoto Prefectural Gymnasium, Kumamoto; Attendance: 550; Referees: Hizaki, Ikebuchi (JPN)

=== Third place game ===
9 December 2018; 12:45	Kazakhstan	21–27	China	Kumamoto Prefectural Gymnasium, Kumamoto; Attendance: 2,400; Referees: Shimajiri, Ota (JPN)
9 December 2018; 12:45	three players 4	(11–13)	Huang Y., Zhou 6	Kumamoto Prefectural Gymnasium, Kumamoto; Attendance: 2,400; Referees: Shimajiri, Ota (JPN)
9 December 2018; 12:45	1× (yellow card) 3× (suspension)	Report	3× (yellow card) 4× (suspension)	Kumamoto Prefectural Gymnasium, Kumamoto; Attendance: 2,400; Referees: Shimajiri, Ota (JPN)

=== Final ===
9 December 2018; 15:00	South Korea	30–25	Japan	Kumamoto Prefectural Gymnasium, Kumamoto; Attendance: 3,087; Referees: Al-Mawt, Marhoon (BHR)
9 December 2018; 15:00	Ryu 11	(14–15)	Hara, Yokoshima 5	Kumamoto Prefectural Gymnasium, Kumamoto; Attendance: 3,087; Referees: Al-Mawt, Marhoon (BHR)
9 December 2018; 15:00	1× (yellow card) 3× (suspension)	Report	2× (yellow card) 5× (suspension)	Kumamoto Prefectural Gymnasium, Kumamoto; Attendance: 3,087; Referees: Al-Mawt, Marhoon (BHR)

== Final standing ==
Rank	Team
1st place, gold medalist(s)	South Korea
2nd place, silver medalist(s)	Japan
3rd place, bronze medalist(s)	China
4	Kazakhstan
5	Australia^{[1]}
6	Iran
7	Hong Kong
8	India
9	Singapore
10	New Zealand

1. If countries from Oceania (Australia or New Zealand) participating in the Asian Championships finished within the top 5, they qualified for the World Championships. If they had both placed sixth or lower, the place would have been transferred to the wild card spot.

Qualified for the 2019 World Women's Handball Championship

== Statistics ==
=== Top goalscorers ===
Rank	Name	Team	Goals
1	Sally Potocki	Australia	57
2	Dana Abilda	Kazakhstan	40
3	Menika Menika	India	32
3	Jung Yu-ra	South Korea	32
5	Jin Mengqing	China	31

=== Top goalkeepers ===
Rank	Name	Team	Saves (exc. 7M)	Shots (exc. 7M)	7M Saves	7M Thr.	Total Saves	Total Shots	%
1	Manon Vernay	Australia	100	217	7	29	107	246	43.49%
2	Nina Shil	India	63	184	2	24	65	208	31.73%
3	Zhannat Aitenova	Kazakhstan	46	173	5	18	51	191	26.70%
4	Fatemeh Khalili Behfar	Iran	38	128	4	17	42	145	28.96%
5	Sakura Hauge	Japan	35	88	2	6	37	94	39.36%
6	Minami Itano	Japan	33	67	1	9	34	76	44.74%
7	Park Sae-young	South Korea	27	66	2	8	29	74	39.19%
8	Ju Hui	South Korea	28	81	0	5	28	86	32.56%
9	Chan Kam Ling	Hong Kong	25	78	0	33	25	111	22.52%
10	Huang Xia	China	23	46	1	6	24	52	46.15%
