= 2013 IHF Super Globe =

Tournament details
- Host country: Qatar
- Venue(s): 1 (in 1 host city)
- Dates: 25–30 August
- Teams: 8 (from 5 confederations)

Final positions
- Champions: (Spain) FC Barcelona (1st title)
- Runner-up: (Germany) HSV Hamburg
- Third place: (Qatar) El Jaish
- Fourth place: (Tunisia) Étoile du Sahel

Tournament statistics
- Matches played: 20
- Goals scored: 1,066 (53.3 per match)
- Attendance: 31,750 (1,588 per match)
- Top scorer(s): (Tunisia) Rayan Aribi (35 goals)

Awards
- Best player: (Tunisia) Selim Hedoui

The 2013 IHF Super Globe was the seventh edition. It was held in Doha, Qatar at the Al-Gharafa Sports Club Hall from 25–30 August 2013.

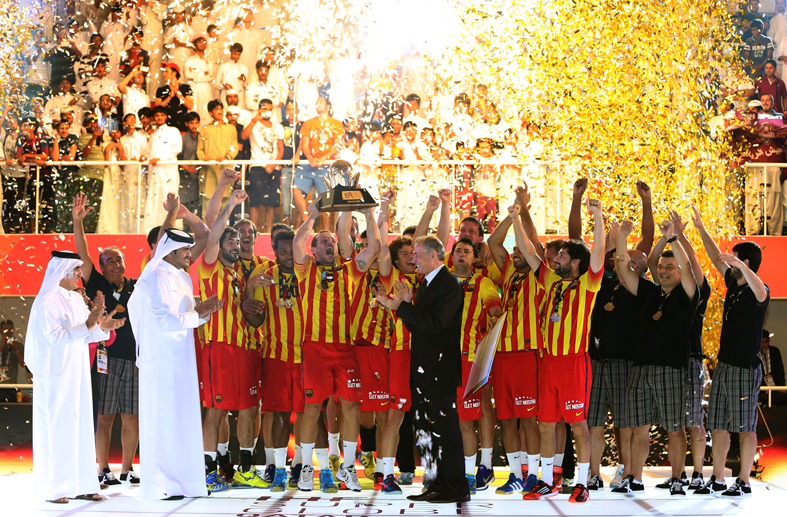
Members of FC Barcelona Intersport celebrate the winning.

FC Barcelona won the title for the first time after defeating HSV Hamburg 27–25 in the final.

== Teams ==
The teams that took part are the respectives continental champions:

- (Australia) Sydney University
- (Brazil) HC Taubaté
- (Germany) HSV Hamburg
- (Qatar) Al Rayyan
- (Qatar) Al Sadd
- (Qatar) El Jaish
- (Spain) FC Barcelona (replaces Atlético Madrid)
- (Tunisia) Étoile du Sahel

== Draw ==
=== Seedings ===
The seedings were announced on 24 June with the draw being held at 27 July.

Pot 1	Pot 2	Pot 3	Pot 4
(Spain) FC Barcelona (Germany) HSV Hamburg	(Qatar) Al Sadd (Tunisia) Étoile du Sahel	(Qatar) El Jaish (Qatar) Al Rayyan	(Brazil) HC Taubaté (Australia) Sydney University

== Preliminary round ==
The draw was held on July 27, 2013.

Legend
Qualified for the semifinals

All times are local (UTC+3).

=== Group A ===
Team	Pld	W	D	L	GF	GA	GD	Pts
(Germany) HSV Hamburg	3	2	1	0	94	73	+21	5
(Qatar) El Jaish	3	1	2	0	89	65	+24	4
(Qatar) Al Sadd	3	1	1	1	84	72	+12	3
(Australia) Sydney University	3	0	0	3	49	106	−57	0

25 August 2013; 17:00	HSV Hamburg (Germany)	29 – 29	(Qatar) El Jaish	Al-Gharafa Sports Club Hall, Doha; Attendance: 2,000; Referees: Al-Marzouqi, Al-Nuaimi (UAE)
25 August 2013; 17:00	Schröder 9	(13–13)	Roganović 7	Al-Gharafa Sports Club Hall, Doha; Attendance: 2,000; Referees: Al-Marzouqi, Al-Nuaimi (UAE)
25 August 2013; 17:00	3× (yellow card) 7× (suspension)	Report	3× (yellow card) 3× (suspension)	Al-Gharafa Sports Club Hall, Doha; Attendance: 2,000; Referees: Al-Marzouqi, Al-Nuaimi (UAE)

25 August 2013; 20:15	Al Sadd (Qatar)	33 – 20	(Australia) Sydney University	Al-Gharafa Sports Club Hall, Doha; Attendance: 1,000; Referees: Menezes, Pinto (BRA)
25 August 2013; 20:15	Al-Karbi 8	(18–10)	Hert 4	Al-Gharafa Sports Club Hall, Doha; Attendance: 1,000; Referees: Menezes, Pinto (BRA)
25 August 2013; 20:15	3× (yellow card) 2× (suspension)	Report	3× (yellow card) 10× (suspension)	Al-Gharafa Sports Club Hall, Doha; Attendance: 1,000; Referees: Menezes, Pinto (BRA)

26 August 2013; 18:00	Sydney University (Australia)	15 – 35	(Germany) HSV Hamburg	Al-Gharafa Sports Club Hall, Doha; Attendance: 1,500; Referees: Diabete, Couliabaly (CIV)
26 August 2013; 18:00	Llorente 5	(4–20)	Schröder 9	Al-Gharafa Sports Club Hall, Doha; Attendance: 1,500; Referees: Diabete, Couliabaly (CIV)
26 August 2013; 18:00	2× (yellow card) 8× (suspension)	Report	3× (yellow card) 3× (suspension)	Al-Gharafa Sports Club Hall, Doha; Attendance: 1,500; Referees: Diabete, Couliabaly (CIV)

26 August 2013; 20:00	Al Sadd (Qatar)	22 – 22	(Qatar) El Jaish	Al-Gharafa Sports Club Hall, Doha; Attendance: 1,000; Referees: Nikolić, Stojković (SRB)
26 August 2013; 20:00	Messaoud 6	(12–10)	El-Ahmar 7	Al-Gharafa Sports Club Hall, Doha; Attendance: 1,000; Referees: Nikolić, Stojković (SRB)
26 August 2013; 20:00	4× (yellow card) 2× (suspension)	Report	3× (yellow card) 7× (suspension)	Al-Gharafa Sports Club Hall, Doha; Attendance: 1,000; Referees: Nikolić, Stojković (SRB)

27 August 2013; 18:00	HSV Hamburg (Germany)	30 – 29	(Qatar) Al Sadd	Al-Gharafa Sports Club Hall, Doha; Attendance: 1,500; Referees: Reveret, Pichon (FRA)
27 August 2013; 18:00	Marković 7	(18–15)	Al-Krad 7	Al-Gharafa Sports Club Hall, Doha; Attendance: 1,500; Referees: Reveret, Pichon (FRA)
27 August 2013; 18:00	3× (yellow card) 4× (suspension)	Report	2× (yellow card) 4× (suspension)	Al-Gharafa Sports Club Hall, Doha; Attendance: 1,500; Referees: Reveret, Pichon (FRA)

27 August 2013; 20:00	El Jaish (Qatar)	38 – 14	(Australia) Sydney University	Al-Gharafa Sports Club Hall, Doha; Attendance: 500; Referees: Menezes, Pinto (BRA)
27 August 2013; 20:00	Sanai 6	(20–6)	Lennstrom 3	Al-Gharafa Sports Club Hall, Doha; Attendance: 500; Referees: Menezes, Pinto (BRA)
27 August 2013; 20:00	2× (yellow card) 3× (suspension)	Report	2× (yellow card) 4× (suspension)	Al-Gharafa Sports Club Hall, Doha; Attendance: 500; Referees: Menezes, Pinto (BRA)

=== Group B ===
Team	Pld	W	D	L	GF	GA	GD	Pts
(Spain) FC Barcelona	3	3	0	0	104	70	+34	6
(Tunisia) Étoile du Sahel	3	2	0	1	86	81	+5	4
(Brazil) HC Taubaté	3	1	0	2	69	87	−18	2
(Qatar) Al Rayyan	3	0	0	3	74	95	−21	0

25 August 2013; 13:00	Étoile du Sahel (Tunisia)	29 – 24	(Brazil) HC Taubaté	Al-Gharafa Sports Club Hall, Doha; Attendance: 2,000; Referees: Horáček, Novotný (CZE)
25 August 2013; 13:00	Bannour, Rzig 6	(14–11)	Silva, Santos 5	Al-Gharafa Sports Club Hall, Doha; Attendance: 2,000; Referees: Horáček, Novotný (CZE)
25 August 2013; 13:00	3× (yellow card) 3× (suspension)	Report	3× (yellow card) 7× (suspension)	Al-Gharafa Sports Club Hall, Doha; Attendance: 2,000; Referees: Horáček, Novotný (CZE)

25 August 2013; 15:00	FC Barcelona (Spain)	38 – 25	(Qatar) Al Rayyan	Al-Gharafa Sports Club Hall, Doha; Attendance: 2,000; Referees: Diabete, Couliabaly (CIV)
25 August 2013; 15:00	three players 6	(21–14)	Al Gharaballi 9	Al-Gharafa Sports Club Hall, Doha; Attendance: 2,000; Referees: Diabete, Couliabaly (CIV)
25 August 2013; 15:00	3× (yellow card) 4× (suspension)	Report	4× (yellow card) 6× (suspension)	Al-Gharafa Sports Club Hall, Doha; Attendance: 2,000; Referees: Diabete, Couliabaly (CIV)

26 August 2013; 14:00	Al Rayyan (Qatar)	23 – 30	(Tunisia) Étoile du Sahel	Al-Gharafa Sports Club Hall, Doha; Attendance: 2,000; Referees: Reveret, Pichon (FRA)
26 August 2013; 14:00	Al Gharaballi 7	(15–18)	Ayed 8	Al-Gharafa Sports Club Hall, Doha; Attendance: 2,000; Referees: Reveret, Pichon (FRA)
26 August 2013; 14:00	3× (yellow card) 3× (suspension)	Report	3× (yellow card) 7× (suspension)	Al-Gharafa Sports Club Hall, Doha; Attendance: 2,000; Referees: Reveret, Pichon (FRA)

26 August 2013; 16:00	HC Taubaté (Brazil)	18 – 32	(Spain) FC Barcelona	Al-Gharafa Sports Club Hall, Doha; Attendance: 2,000; Referees: Al-Nuaimi, Al-Marzouqi (UAE)
26 August 2013; 16:00	Ribeiro 5	(10–15)	Cedric 7	Al-Gharafa Sports Club Hall, Doha; Attendance: 2,000; Referees: Al-Nuaimi, Al-Marzouqi (UAE)
26 August 2013; 16:00	3× (yellow card) 6× (suspension) 1× (red card)	Report	3× (yellow card) 2× (suspension)	Al-Gharafa Sports Club Hall, Doha; Attendance: 2,000; Referees: Al-Nuaimi, Al-Marzouqi (UAE)

27 August 2013; 14:00	FC Barcelona (Spain)	34 – 27	(Tunisia) Étoile du Sahel	Al-Gharafa Sports Club Hall, Doha; Attendance: 2,000; Referees: Nikolić, Stojković (SRB)
27 August 2013; 14:00	three players 4	(11–12)	three players 4	Al-Gharafa Sports Club Hall, Doha; Attendance: 2,000; Referees: Nikolić, Stojković (SRB)
27 August 2013; 14:00	3× (yellow card) 7× (suspension)	Report	4× (yellow card) 5× (suspension) 1× (red card)	Al-Gharafa Sports Club Hall, Doha; Attendance: 2,000; Referees: Nikolić, Stojković (SRB)

27 August 2013; 16:00	Al Rayyan (Qatar)	26 – 27	(Brazil) HC Taubaté	Al-Gharafa Sports Club Hall, Doha; Attendance: 1,500; Referees: Novotný, Horáček (CZE)
27 August 2013; 16:00	Aribi 7	(15–11)	Ribeiro 10	Al-Gharafa Sports Club Hall, Doha; Attendance: 1,500; Referees: Novotný, Horáček (CZE)
27 August 2013; 16:00	3× (yellow card) 4× (suspension)	Report	3× (yellow card) 5× (suspension)	Al-Gharafa Sports Club Hall, Doha; Attendance: 1,500; Referees: Novotný, Horáček (CZE)

== Knockout stage ==
=== 5–8th place bracket ===
5–8th semifinals
29 August
(Qatar) Al Sadd	19
(Qatar) Al Rayyan	32
29 August
(Australia) Sydney University	14
(Brazil) HC Taubaté	28

Fifth place
30 August
(Qatar) Al Rayyan	30
(Brazil) HC Taubaté	28
Seventh place
30 August
(Qatar) Al Sadd	30
(Australia) Sydney University	18

==== Semifinals ====
29 August 2013; 14:00	Sydney University (Australia)	14 – 28	(Brazil) HC Taubaté	Al-Gharafa Sports Club Hall, Doha; Attendance: 750; Referees: Reveret, Pichon (FRA)
29 August 2013; 14:00	Szklarski 5	(6–11)	Lago 5	Al-Gharafa Sports Club Hall, Doha; Attendance: 750; Referees: Reveret, Pichon (FRA)
29 August 2013; 14:00	2× (yellow card) 5× (suspension)	Report	2× (yellow card) 2× (suspension)	Al-Gharafa Sports Club Hall, Doha; Attendance: 750; Referees: Reveret, Pichon (FRA)

29 August 2013; 16:00	Al Sadd (Qatar)	19 – 32	(Qatar) Al Rayyan	Al-Gharafa Sports Club Hall, Doha; Attendance: 1,000; Referees: Diabete, Couliabaly (CIV)
29 August 2013; 16:00	Al-Karbi 6	(11–17)	Filippov 11	Al-Gharafa Sports Club Hall, Doha; Attendance: 1,000; Referees: Diabete, Couliabaly (CIV)
29 August 2013; 16:00	2× (yellow card) 7× (suspension)	Report	2× (yellow card) 4× (suspension)	Al-Gharafa Sports Club Hall, Doha; Attendance: 1,000; Referees: Diabete, Couliabaly (CIV)

==== Seventh place game ====
30 August 2013; 13:30	Sydney University (Australia)	18 – 30	(Qatar) Al Sadd	Al-Gharafa Sports Club Hall, Doha; Attendance: 1,000; Referees: Diabete, Couliabaly (CIV)
30 August 2013; 13:30	Hert 5	(10–14)	Omahic 6	Al-Gharafa Sports Club Hall, Doha; Attendance: 1,000; Referees: Diabete, Couliabaly (CIV)
30 August 2013; 13:30	4× (yellow card) 5× (suspension)	Report	3× (yellow card) 4× (suspension)	Al-Gharafa Sports Club Hall, Doha; Attendance: 1,000; Referees: Diabete, Couliabaly (CIV)

==== Fifth place game ====
30 August 2013; 15:30	HC Taubaté (Brazil)	28 – 30	(Qatar) Al Rayyan	Al-Gharafa Sports Club Hall, Doha; Attendance: 2,000; Referees: Al-Nuaimi, Al-Marzouqi (UAE)
30 August 2013; 15:30	Oliveira 7	(12–17)	Aribi 10	Al-Gharafa Sports Club Hall, Doha; Attendance: 2,000; Referees: Al-Nuaimi, Al-Marzouqi (UAE)
30 August 2013; 15:30	3× (yellow card) 4× (suspension) 1× (red card)	Report	3× (yellow card) 4× (suspension)	Al-Gharafa Sports Club Hall, Doha; Attendance: 2,000; Referees: Al-Nuaimi, Al-Marzouqi (UAE)

=== Championship bracket ===
Semi-finals
29 August
(Germany) HSV Hamburg	36
(Tunisia) Étoile du Sahel	22
29 August
(Qatar) El Jaish	31
(Spain) FC Barcelona	40

Final
30 August
(Germany) HSV Hamburg	25
(Spain) FC Barcelona	27
Third place
30 August
(Tunisia) Étoile du Sahel	20
(Qatar) El Jaish	27

==== Semifinals ====
29 August 2013; 18:00	Étoile du Sahel (Tunisia)	22 – 36	(Germany) HSV Hamburg	Al-Gharafa Sports Club Hall, Doha; Attendance: 2,000; Referees: Novotný, Horáček (CZE)
29 August 2013; 18:00	Zeinelabedin 7	(9–16)	Lindberg 8	Al-Gharafa Sports Club Hall, Doha; Attendance: 2,000; Referees: Novotný, Horáček (CZE)
29 August 2013; 18:00	2× (yellow card) 3× (suspension)	Report	3× (yellow card) 6× (suspension)	Al-Gharafa Sports Club Hall, Doha; Attendance: 2,000; Referees: Novotný, Horáček (CZE)

29 August 2013; 20:15	FC Barcelona (Spain)	40 – 31	(Qatar) El Jaish	Al-Gharafa Sports Club Hall, Doha; Attendance: 2,000; Referees: Menezes, Pinto (BRA)
29 August 2013; 20:15	Rutenka 6	(20–14)	Sanai 6	Al-Gharafa Sports Club Hall, Doha; Attendance: 2,000; Referees: Menezes, Pinto (BRA)
29 August 2013; 20:15	3× (yellow card) 7× (suspension)	Report	3× (yellow card) 8× (suspension)	Al-Gharafa Sports Club Hall, Doha; Attendance: 2,000; Referees: Menezes, Pinto (BRA)

==== Third place game ====
30 August 2013; 17:30	Étoile du Sahel (Tunisia)	20 – 27	(Qatar) El Jaish	Al-Gharafa Sports Club Hall, Doha; Attendance: 2,000; Referees: Pichon, Reveret (FRA)
30 August 2013; 17:30	Zeinelabedin 6	(8–13)	Hedoui 8	Al-Gharafa Sports Club Hall, Doha; Attendance: 2,000; Referees: Pichon, Reveret (FRA)
30 August 2013; 17:30	3× (yellow card) 3× (suspension)	Report	2× (yellow card) 5× (suspension)	Al-Gharafa Sports Club Hall, Doha; Attendance: 2,000; Referees: Pichon, Reveret (FRA)

==== Final ====
30 August 2013; 20:00	HSV Hamburg (Germany)	25 – 27	(Spain) FC Barcelona	Al-Gharafa Sports Club Hall, Doha; Attendance: 2,000; Referees: Nikolić, Stojković (SRB)
30 August 2013; 20:00	Lindberg 7	(13–15)	Tomás 5	Al-Gharafa Sports Club Hall, Doha; Attendance: 2,000; Referees: Nikolić, Stojković (SRB)
30 August 2013; 20:00	4× (yellow card) 7× (suspension)	Report	3× (yellow card) 5× (suspension)	Al-Gharafa Sports Club Hall, Doha; Attendance: 2,000; Referees: Nikolić, Stojković (SRB)

== Final ranking ==
1	(Spain) FC Barcelona
2	(Germany) HSV Hamburg
3	(Qatar) El Jaish
4	(Tunisia) Étoile du Sahel
5	(Qatar) Al Rayyan
6	(Brazil) HC Taubaté
7	(Qatar) Al Sadd
8	(Australia) Sydney University
