= List of handball clubs in Qatar =

The following is a list of handball clubs in Qatar currently participating in the Qatar Handball League:

- Al Rayyan SC
- Al Sadd SC
- El Jaish SC
- Lekhwiya SC
- Al Khor SC
- Qatar SC
- Al Qiyadah SC
- Al Arabi SC
- Al Gharafa SC
- Al Wakrah SC
- Al Ahli SC
- Al Shamal SC
