= Darko Stanić =

Qatari handball player (born 1978)

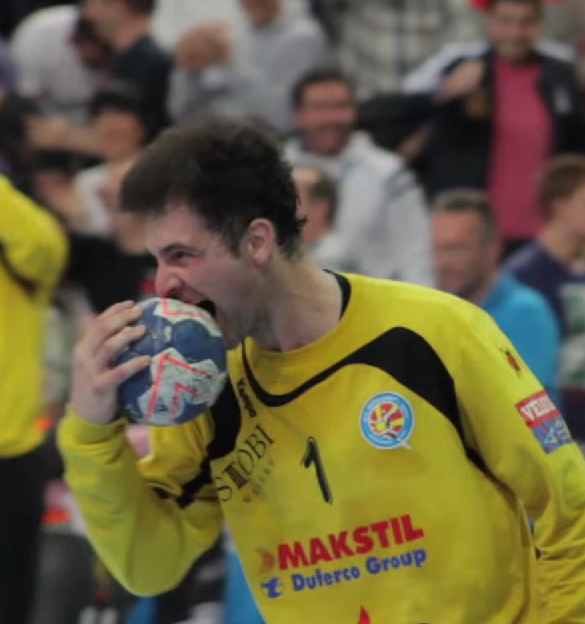
- Stanić in 2014

Personal information
- Full name: Darko Stanić
- Nationality: Serbian
- Born: 8 October 1978 (age 48) Mojkovac, SR Montenegro, SFR Yugoslavia
- Height: 1.91 m (6 ft 3 in)

Sport
- Sport: Handball
- Position: Goalkeeper
- Current club: Al Rayyan
- Number: 12
National team
- Years: Team
- 2008–2016: Serbia
Medal record
Men's handball
Representing Serbia
European Championship
Silver medal – second place	2012 Serbia	Team

Darko Stanić (Serbian Cyrillic: Дарко Станић; born 8 October 1978) is a Serbian former handball player for the Qatari Al Rayyan and the Serbia national team. He was dubbed the "Minister of Defence" due to his performances for the Serbia.

== Club career ==
After making his EHF Champions League debut with Crvena zvezda, Stanić moved abroad to Switzerland and joined TV Suhr in early 2005. He spent the next season at fellow Swiss club Grasshoppers. In April 2006, Stanić tested positive for cocaine after a play-off match with St. Gallen. He consequently received a six-month ban from handball. However, the ban was eventually extended for a period of two years, starting on 22 May 2006.

After serving his two-year suspension, Stanić signed with Slovenian club Koper in May 2008. He spent three seasons in Slovenia, before moving to Macedonian side Metalurg Skopje. Later on, Stanić also briefly played in Germany (SG BBM Bietigheim and Rhein-Neckar Löwen), Kuwait (Kuwait SC), and Qatar (El Jaish and Al Sadd and Al Rayyan).

== International career ==
Stanić made his major international debut for Serbia at the 2009 World Championship. He was later an integral part of the team that won the silver medal at the 2012 European Championship, being named the tournament's best goalkeeper. Stanić also participated in the 2012 Summer Olympics.

== Honours ==
Crvena zvezda

- Serbia and Montenegro Handball Super League: 2003–04
- Serbia and Montenegro Handball Cup: 2003–04

Koper

- Slovenian First League: 2010–11
- Slovenian Cup: 2008–09, 2010–11

Metalurg Skopje

- Macedonian Handball Super League: 2011–12, 2013–14
- Macedonian Handball Cup: 2012–13

El Jaish

- Qatar Handball League: 2015–16
- Qatar Handball Cup: 2015–16
