= Mario Tomić =

Mario Tomić may refer to:

- Mario Tomić (musician) (born 1987), Croatian music composer
- Mario Tomić (handballer) (born 1988), Croatian handball player

== See also ==
- Marko Tomić (born 1991), Serbian footballer
