= Duško Čelica =

Bosnian handball player

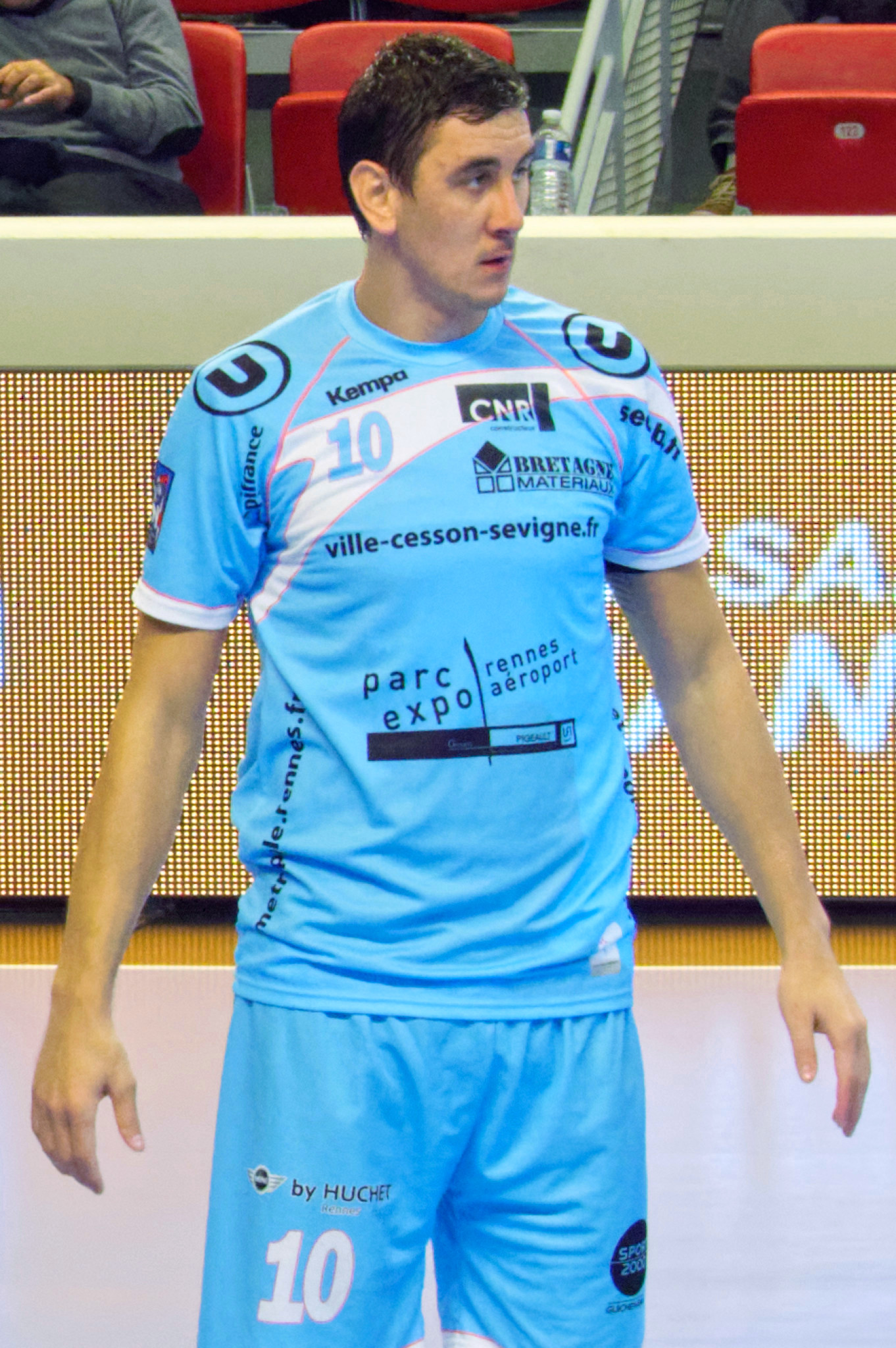
- Duško Čelica (2014)

Personal information
- Born: 16 August 1986 (age 40) Bosanska Dubica, SFR Yugoslavia (today part of Bosnia and Herzegovina)
- Height: 1.98 m (6 ft 6 in)

Sport
- Sport: Handball
- Position: Left back
- Current club: RK Vogošća
- Number: 10

Senior clubs
- Years: Team
- 2002–2007: (Bosnia and Herzegovina) Kozara
- 2007–2008: (Slovenia) Cimos Koper
- 2008–2010: (Slovenia) Maribor Branik
- 2010–2011: (Bosnia and Herzegovina) Bosna Sarajevo
- 2011–2012: Red Army Qatar
- 2012: (Qatar) El Jaish SC
- 2013: (United Arab Emirates) Al Shabab
- 2013–2014: (France) Cesson Rennes
- 2014: → (France) Sélestat AHB (loan)
- 2014–2015: (Croatia) PPD Zagreb
- 2015: → (Qatar) Al Sadd SC (loan)
- 2015–2016: (Germany) ThSV Eisenach
- 2016–2017: (Romania) HC Dobrogea Sud
- 2017–2018: (Israel) Hapoel Rishon LeZion
- 2018: → (Bosnia and Herzegovina) RK Slavija (loan)
National team
Years	Team	Apps	(Gls)
2011–	Bosnia and Herzegovina	35	(75)
- Updated on 4 May 2015

Duško Čelica (Serbian Cyrillic: Душко Челица, born 18 August 1986) is a Bosnian handball player who plays for RK Vogošća and for the Bosnian national handball team.

== Career ==
He started playing handball for local club RK Kozara in Kozarska Dubica, the town in Bosnia and Herzegovina where he was born.

=== PPD Zagreb ===
Čelica sign for PPD Zagreb in December 2014. He scored game-winning goal from 15 meters against Naturhouse La Rioja during EHF Champions League group stage game. In May 2015 Čelica is loaned out to Al Sadd SC.

== Career statistics ==
=== EHF Champions League ===
Year	Team	Games	Goals
2010–11	Bosna Sarajevo	11	22
2014–15	PPD Zagreb	6	7

=== IHF Super Globe ===
Year	Team	Games	Goals	Shots	Assists
2012	El Jaish SC	5	12	25	3

=== International ===
Year	Competition	Games	Goals	Shots	Assists
2015	World Championship	7	14	27	13

== Achievements ==
- Croatian Premier Handball League:
  - Winner: 2015
- Croatian Handball Cup :
  - Winner: 2015
