= Mahmoud Karam =

Egyptian handball player

Personal information
- Full name: Mahmoud Abdeldayem Karam Abd Rabou
- Nationality: Egyptian
- Born: 17 November 1982 (age 42)

Sport
- Sport: Handball
- Position: Right back
- Club: Al Rayyan

Mahmoud Karam (born 17 November 1982) is an Egyptian handball player for Al Rayyan and the Egypt national team. He competed in the men's tournament at the 2004 Summer Olympics.

== Career ==
He was part of El-Tayaran in Egypt during the 2015–2016 season, then moved to El Jaish in Qatar for the 2016–2017 season. He returned to Egypt to play for El-Shams SC in the 2017–2018 and 2018–2019 seasons.
