= Aribi =

Aribi is the last name of:

- Salim Aribi (born 1974), Algerian football player
- Rayan Aribi (born 1987), Tunisian handball player

Aribi also stands for:

- a district of the Local Government District of Kagarko, Nigeria
- one of several names for proto-Arabic tribes in ancient times, compare Arab (etymology)
