= IHF Men's Super Globe =

International club handball competition

- Current season, competition or edition: 2026 IHF Men's Club World Championship
- Sport: Handball
- Founded: 1997; 29 years ago
- No. of teams: 12
- Confederation: IHF members
- Most recent champion: (Hungary) One Veszprém HC (2nd title)
- Most titles: (Spain) FC Barcelona (6 titles)
- Website: Official website

The Men's Super Globe is a handball competition contested between the champion clubs from continental confederations.

On 7 December 2018, the IHF moved the Super Globe to Saudi Arabia for four years, until 2022. In May 2024, the IHF moved the Super Globe to Egypt, until 2026.

== Summary ==
Year	Host	Final			Third place match		
Year	Host	Champion	Score	Second place	Third place	Score	Fourth place
1997; Details	(Austria); Vienna	(Spain); CB Cantabria	30–29	(Norway); Drammen HK	(South Korea); Doosan KyungWol	33–27	(Austria); HC Stadtwerke Bruck
2002; Details	(Qatar); Doha	(Qatar); Al Sadd	No playoffs	(Germany); SC Magdeburg	(Brazil); Metodista SBC	No playoffs	(Kuwait); Al-Salmiya
2007; Details	(Egypt); Cairo	(Spain); BM Ciudad Real	No playoffs	(Egypt); Al-Ahly SC	(Algeria); MC Alger	No playoffs	(Brazil); Metodista SBC
2010; Details	(Qatar); Doha	(Spain); BM Ciudad Real	30–25	(Qatar); Al-Sadd	(Egypt); Zamalek SC	33–22	(Lebanon); Al-Sadd
2011; Details	(Qatar); Doha	(Germany); THW Kiel	28–25	(Spain); BM Ciudad Real	(Lebanon); Al-Sadd	28–23	(Egypt); Zamalek SC
2012; Details	(Qatar); Doha	(Spain); Atlético Madrid	28–23	(Germany); THW Kiel	(Qatar); Al-Sadd	32–26	(Egypt); Zamalek SC
2013; Details	(Qatar); Doha	(Spain); FC Barcelona	27–25	(Germany); HSV Hamburg	(Qatar); El Jaish	27–20	(Tunisia); Étoile du Sahel
2014; Details	(Qatar); Doha	(Spain); FC Barcelona	34–26	(Qatar); Al-Sadd	(Germany); SG Flensburg-Handewitt	27–17	(Qatar); El Jaish
2015; Details	(Qatar); Doha	(Germany); Füchse Berlin	28–27 (OT)	(Hungary); MKB Veszprém	(Spain); FC Barcelona	30–20	(Australia); Sydney University
2016; Details	(Qatar); Doha	(Germany); Füchse Berlin	29–28	(France); Paris Saint-Germain	(Poland); Vive Targi Kielce	36–25	(Qatar); Al Sadd
2017; Details	(Qatar); Doha	(Spain); FC Barcelona	29–25	(Germany); Füchse Berlin	(North Macedonia); RK Vardar	37–19	(Qatar); Al Sadd
2018; Details	(Qatar); Doha	(Spain); FC Barcelona	29–24	(Germany); Füchse Berlin	(France); Montpellier	33–23	(Qatar); Al Sadd
2019; Details	(Saudi Arabia); Dammam	(Spain); FC Barcelona	34–32	(Germany); THW Kiel	(North Macedonia); RK Vardar	30–26	(Saudi Arabia); Al Wehda
~~2020~~	(Saudi Arabia); Dammam	Cancelled due to the COVID-19 pandemic					
2021; Details	(Saudi Arabia); Jeddah	(Germany); SC Magdeburg	33–28	(Spain); FC Barcelona	(Denmark); Aalborg Håndbold	34–29	(Brazil); E.C. Pinheiros
2022; Details	(Saudi Arabia); Dammam	(Germany); SC Magdeburg	41–39 (OT)	(Spain); FC Barcelona	(Poland); Łomża Industria Kielce	35–26	(Egypt); Al Ahly
2023; Details	(Saudi Arabia); Dammam	(Germany); SC Magdeburg	34–32 (OT)	(Germany); Füchse Berlin	(Spain); FC Barcelona	33–30	(Poland); Łomża Industria Kielce
2024; Details	(Egypt); New Administrative Capital	(Hungary); Telekom Veszprém	34–33 (OT)	(Germany); SC Magdeburg	(Egypt); Al Ahly	32–29	(Spain); FC Barcelona
2025; Details	(Egypt); New Administrative Capital	(Spain); FC Barcelona	31–30 (OT)	(Hungary); Telekom Veszprém	(Germany); SC Magdeburg	32–23	(Egypt); Al Ahly
2026; Details	(Egypt); New Administrative Capital	(Hungary); One Veszprém HC	42–33	(Spain); FC Barcelona	(Egypt); Al Ahly	30–25	(Egypt); Zamalek SC

== Records and statistics ==
=== By club ===
Rank	Club	Won	Runner-up	Third	Years won
1	(Spain) FC Barcelona	6	3	2	2013, 2014, 2017, 2018, 2019, 2025
2	(Germany) SC Magdeburg	3	2	1	2021, 2022, 2023
3	(Germany) Füchse Berlin	2	3	0	2015, 2016
4	(Hungary) Telekom Veszprém	2	2	0	2024, 2026
5	(Spain) BM Ciudad Real	2	1	0	2007, 2010
6	(Qatar) Al-Sadd	1	2	1	2002
7	(Germany) THW Kiel	1	2	0	2011
8	(Spain) Atlético Madrid	1	0	0	2012
8	(Spain) CB Cantabria	1	0	0	1997
10	(Egypt) Al-Ahly SC	0	1	2	
11	(Germany) HSV Hamburg	0	1	0	
11	(Norway) Drammen HK	0	1	0	
11	(France) Paris Saint-Germain	0	1	0	
14	(North Macedonia) RK Vardar	0	0	2	
14	(Poland) Vive Targi Kielce	0	0	2	
16	(Algeria) MC Alger	0	0	1	
16	(Brazil) Metodista SBC	0	0	1	
16	(Egypt) Zamalek SC	0	0	1	
16	(Germany) SG Flensburg-Handewitt	0	0	1	
16	(Lebanon) Al-Sadd	0	0	1	
16	(South Korea) Doosan KyungWol	0	0	1	
16	(Qatar) El Jaish	0	0	1	
16	(France) Montpellier Handball	0	0	1	
16	(Denmark) Aalborg Håndbold	0	0	1	

- Rq:

GS Pétroliers (ex. MC Alger)

=== By country ===
Rank	By Nation	Won	Runner-up	Third	Total
1	Spain	10	4	2	16
2	Germany	6	8	2	16
3	Hungary	2	2	0	4
4	Qatar	1	2	2	5
5	Egypt	0	1	3	4
6	France	0	1	1	2
7	Norway	0	1	0	1
8	North Macedonia	0	0	2	2
8	Poland	0	0	2	2
10	Algeria	0	0	1	1
10	Brazil	0	0	1	1
10	Denmark	0	0	1	1
10	Lebanon	0	0	1	1
10	South Korea	0	0	1	1
Total		19	19	19	57

== Participation details ==
Team	1997	2002	2007	2010	2011	2012	2013	2014	2015	2016	2017	2018	2019	2021	2022	2023	2024	2025	2026	Total
(Algeria) MC Alger	7th	•	3rd	•	•	•	•	•	•	•	•	•	•	•	•	•	•	•	•	2
(Argentina) San Fernando HB	•	•	•	•	•	•	•	•	•	•	•	•	•	•	•	11th	•	•	•	1
(Australia) Southern Stars	•	•	•	6th	8th	•	•	•	•	•	•	•	•	•	•	•	•	•	•	2
(Australia) Sydney University	•	•	•	•	•	8th	8th	8th	4th	8th	8th	8th	10th	8th	11th	•	7th	9th	10th	13
(Australia) University of Queensland	•	•	•	•	•	•	•	•	•	•	•	•	•	•	•	12th	•	•	•	1
(Austria) HC Sparkasse Bruck	4th	•	•	•	•	•	•	•	•	•	•	•	•	•	•	•	•	•	•	1
(Bahrain) Al-Najma	•	•	•	•	•	•	•	•	•	•	•	7th	•	•	•	8th	•	•	•	2
(Brazil) EC Pinheiros	•	•	•	•	5th	•	•	•	•	•	5th	•	•	4th	•	•	•	•	6th	4
(Brazil) HC Taubaté	•	•	•	•	•	•	6th	6th	6th	7th	•	5th	6th	•	8th	•	8th	7th	•	9
(Brazil) Metodista São Bernardo	•	3rd	4th	•	•	6th	•	•	•	•	•	•	•	•	•	•	•	•	•	3
(Brazil) Metodista São Paulo	6th	•	•	•	•	•	•	•	•	•	•	•	•	•	•	•	•	•	•	1
(Brazil) Unopar HC	•	•	•	5th	•	•	•	•	•	•	•	•	•	•	•	•	•	•	•	1
(Cameroon) FAP Yaoundé	•	4th	•	•	•	•	•	•	•	•	•	•	•	•	•	•	•	•	•	1
(Denmark) Aalborg Håndbold	•	•	•	•	•	•	•	•	•	•	•	•	•	3rd	•	•	•	•	•	1
(Egypt) Al-Ahly	•	•	2nd	•	•	•	•	•	5th	•	•	•	•	•	4th	5th	3rd	4th	3rd	7
(Egypt) Zamalek SC	•	•	•	3rd	4th	4th	•	•	•	•	•	•	5th	5th	•	•	6th	5th	4th	8
(France) Montpellier Handball	•	•	•	•	•	•	•	•	•	•	•	3rd	•	•	•	•	•	•	•	1
(France) Paris Saint-Germain	•	•	•	•	•	•	•	•	•	2nd	•	•	•	•	•	•	•	•	•	1
(Germany) Flensburg-Handewitt	•	•	•	•	•	•	•	3rd	•	•	•	•	•	•	•	•	•	•	•	1
(Germany) Füchse Berlin	•	•	•	•	•	•	•	•	1st	1st	2nd	2nd	•	•	•	2nd	•	•	5th	6
(Germany) HSV Hamburg	•	•	•	•	•	•	2nd	•	•	•	•	•	•	•	•	•	•	•	•	1
(Germany) SC Magdeburg	•	2nd	•	•	•	•	•	•	•	•	•	•	•	1st	1st	1st	2nd	3rd	•	6
(Germany) THW Kiel	•	•	•	•	1st	2nd	•	•	•	•	•	•	2nd	•	•	•	•	•	•	3
(Hungary) Telekom Veszprém	•	•	•	•	•	•	•	•	2nd	•	•	•	•	•	•	•	1st	2nd	1st	4
(Iran) Naft & Gaz Gachsaran	•	•	•	•	•	•	•	•	•	•	7th	•	•	•	•	•	•	•	•	1
(Japan) Osaki Denki Tokyo	5th	•	•	•	•	•	•	•	•	•	•	•	•	•	•	•	•	•	•	1
(Kuwait) Burgan SC	•	•	•	•	•	•	•	•	•	•	•	•	•	•	•	•	•	•	7th	1
Al-Kuwait SC	•	•	•	•	•	•	•	•	•	•	•	•	•	•	9th	7th	•	•	•	2
(Kuwait) Al-Qadsiya	•	•	5th	•	•	•	•	•	•	•	•	•	•	•	•	•	•	•	•	1
(Kuwait) Al-Salmiya SC	•	5th	•	•	•	•	•	•	•	•	•	•	•	•	•	•	•	•	•	1
(Lebanon) Al-Sadd	•	•	•	4th	3rd	•	•	•	•	•	•	•	•	•	•	•	•	•	•	2
(Morocco) Mountada Derb Sultan	•	•	•	•	•	•	•	•	•	•	•	•	•	•	•	•	•	•	8th	1
(Mexico) Club Ministros	•	•	•	•	•	•	•	•	•	•	•	•	•	•	12th	•	•	•	•	1
(Morocco) KAC Marrakech	8th	•	•	•	•	•	•	•	•	•	•	•	•	•	•	•	•	•	•	1
(North Macedonia) RK Vardar	•	•	•	•	•	•	•	•	•	•	3rd	•	3rd	•	•	•	•	•	•	2
(Norway) Drammen HK	2nd	•	•	•	•	•	•	•	•	•	•	•	•	•	•	•	•	•	•	1
(Poland) Vive Targi Kielce	•	•	•	•	•	•	•	•	•	3rd	•	•	•	•	3rd	4th	•	•	•	3
(Portugal) SL Benfica	•	•	•	•	•	•	•	•	•	•	•	•	•	•	7th	•	•	•	•	1
(Qatar) Al Ahli	•	•	•	•	•	•	•	7th	•	•	•	•	•	•	•	•	•	•	•	1
(Qatar) Al-Duhail	•	•	•	•	•	•	•	•	•	•	•	•	8th	6th	•	•	•	•	•	2
(Qatar) Al Rayyan	•	•	•	•	7th	•	5th	•	•	•	•	•	•	•	•	•	•	•	•	2
(Qatar) Al Sadd SC	•	1st	•	2nd	6th	3rd	7th	2nd	•	4th	4th	4th	•	•	•	•	•	•	•	9
(Qatar) El Jaish SC	•	•	•	•	•	5th	3rd	4th	8th	•	•	•	•	•	•	•	•	•	•	4
(Qatar) Lekhwiya Handball Team	•	•	•	•	•	•	•	•	•	6th	•	•	•	•	•	•	•	•	•	1
(Saudi Arabia) Al Wehda	•	•	•	•	•	•	•	•	•	•	•	•	4th	9th	•	•	•	•	•	2
(Saudi Arabia) Alnoor Club	•	•	•	•	•	•	•	•	•	•	•	•	•	7th	•	9th	•	•	•	2
(Saudi Arabia) Khaleej Club	•	•	•	•	•	•	•	•	•	•	•	•	•	•	6th	6th	5th	•	•	3
(Saudi Arabia) Mudhar Club	•	•	•	•	•	7th	•	•	•	•	•	•	7th	•	10th	•	•	•	•	3
(South Korea) Doosan Kyung Wol Seoul	3rd	•	•	•	•	•	•	•	•	•	•	•	•	•	•	•	•	•	•	1
(Spain) Atlético Madrid	•	•	•	•	•	1st	•	•	•	•	•	•	•	•	•	•	•	•	•	1
(Spain) BM Ciudad Real	•	•	1st	1st	2nd	•	•	•	•	•	•	•	•	•	•	•	•	•	•	3
(Spain) Caja Cantabria de Santander	1st	•	•	•	•	•	•	•	•	•	•	•	•	•	•	•	•	•	•	1
(Spain) FC Barcelona	•	•	•	•	•	•	1st	1st	3rd	•	1st	1st	1st	2nd	2nd	3rd	4th	1st	2nd	12
(Tunisia) Club Africain	•	•	•	•	•	•	•	•	7th	•	•	•	•	•	•	•	•	•	•	1
(Tunisia) Espérance Sportive de Tunis	•	•	•	•	•	•	•	5th	•	5th	6th	•	•	•	5th	•	•	•	•	4
(Tunisia) Étoile du Sahel	•	•	•	•	•	•	4th	•	•	•	•	•	•	•	•	•	•	•	•	1
(Tunisia) Hammamet	•	•	•	•	•	•	•	•	•	•	•	6th	•	•	•	•	•	•	•	1
(United Arab Emirates) Sharjah HC	•	•	•	•	•	•	•	•	•	•	•	•	•	•	•	•	•	6th	•	1
(United States) California Eagles	•	•	•	•	•	•	•	•	•	•	•	•	•	•	•	•	9th	8th	•	2
(United States) Los Angeles THC	•	•	•	•	•	•	•	•	•	•	•	•	•	•	•	•	•	•	9th	1
(United States) New York City THC	•	•	•	•	•	•	•	•	•	•	•	•	9th	•	•	•	•	•	•	1
(United States) San Francisco CalHeat	•	•	•	•	•	•	•	•	•	•	•	•	•	10th	•	10th	•	•	•	2
Total	8	5	5	6	8	8	8	8	8	8	8	8	10	10	12	12	9	9	10	

== See also ==
- IHF Women's Super Globe
