= 2002 IHF Super Globe =

Tournament details
- Host country: Qatar
- Venue(s): 1 (in 1 host city)
- Dates: 3–9 June
- Teams: 5 (from 5 confederations)

Final positions
- Champions: (Qatar) Al Sadd (1st title)
- Runner-up: (Germany) SC Magdeburg
- Third place: (Brazil) CD São Bernardo
- Fourth place: (Cameroon) FAP Yaoundé

Tournament statistics
- Matches played: 10
- Goals scored: 606 (60.6 per match)

The 2002 IHF Super Globe was the second edition. It was held in Doha, Qatar from 3–9 June 2002. There were just one group playing against each other, so the group ranking was the final ranking.

Al Sadd won the title for the first time.

== Round Robin ==
Team	Pld	W	D	L	GF	GA	GD	Pts
(Qatar) Al Sadd	4	4	0	0	140	96	+44	8
(Germany) SC Magdeburg	4	3	0	1	143	121	+22	6
(Brazil) Metodista São Bernardo	4	2	0	2	110	116	−6	4
(Cameroon) FAP Yaoundé	4	0	1	3	105	132	−27	1
(Kuwait) Al-Salmiya SC	4	0	1	3	108	141	−33	1

== Match results ==
Al Sadd SC (Qatar)	39 – 22	(Cameroon) FAP Yaoundé
	(21 – 8)

Metodista São Bernardo (Brazil)	35 – 26	(Kuwait) Al-Salmiya SC
	(19 – 13)

Al-Salmiya SC (Kuwait)	31 – 31	(Cameroon) FAP Yaoundé
	(16 – 13)

SC Magdeburg (Germany)	32 – 35	(Qatar) Al Sadd SC
	(15 – 18)

Al Sadd SC (Qatar)	30 – 19	(Brazil) Metodista São Bernardo
	(17 – 8)

FAP Yaoundé (Cameroon)	29 – 35	(Germany) SC Magdeburg
	(8 – 17)

Metodista São Bernardo (Brazil)	27 – 23	(Cameroon) FAP Yaoundé
	(12 – 7)

Al-Salmiya SC (Kuwait)	28 – 39	(Germany) SC Magdeburg
	(9 – 19)

SC Magdeburg (Germany)	37 – 29	(Brazil) Metodista São Bernardo
	(18 – 15)

Al-Salmiya SC (Kuwait)	23 – 36	(Qatar) Al Sadd SC
	(14 – 16)
