= Žarko Marković =

Žarko Marković may refer to:

- Žarko Marković (footballer) (born 1987), Serbian footballer
- Žarko Marković (handballer) (born 1986), Montenegrin-Qatari handball player
