= 2024 Asian Men's Handball Championship =

Handball tournament in Bahrain

Tournament details
- Host country: Bahrain
- Venues: 2 (in 2 host cities)
- Dates: 11–25 January
- Teams: 16 (from 2 confederations)

Final positions
- Champions: Qatar (6th title)
- Runners-up: Japan
- Third place: Bahrain
- Fourth place: Kuwait

Tournament statistics
- Matches played: 58
- Goals scored: 3,223 (55.57 per match)

The 2024 Asian Men's Handball Championship was the 21st edition of the championship, held from 11 to 25 January 2024 in Bahrain, under the aegis of Asian Handball Federation (AHF). It was the third time in history that the championship was organised by the Bahrain Handball Federation. It also acted as a qualification tournament for the 2025 World Men's Handball Championship, with top four teams from the championship directly qualifying for the event. If New Zealand finished inside the top five, they would have qualified as well as the representative of Oceania, but they failed to do so.

Qatar won their sixth consecutive and overall title with a finals win over Japan.

== Draw ==
The draw was held on 10 November 2023 in Manama, Bahrain.

=== Seeding ===
Pot 1	Pot 2	Pot 3	Pot 4
Bahrain; Qatar; Saudi Arabia; Iran	South Korea; Iraq; Kuwait; United Arab Emirates	Oman; Hong Kong; India; ~~Australia~~	Japan; China; Chinese Taipei; New Zealand; Kazakhstan

- Australia withdrew before the draw.

== Preliminary round ==
All times are local (UTC+3).

=== Group A ===
Pos	Team	Pld	W	D	L	GF	GA	GD	Pts	Qualification
1	Qatar	3	3	0	0	85	64	+21	6	Group I
2	Kuwait	3	2	0	1	78	77	+1	4	Group II
3	Chinese Taipei	3	1	0	2	86	91	−5	2	Group III
4	Oman	3	0	0	3	71	88	−17	0	Group IV

Source: AHF
Rules for classification: 1) points; 2) head-to-head points; 3) head-to-head goal difference; 4) head-to-head number of goals scored; 5) goal difference.

12 January 2024; 13:00	Chinese Taipei	26–33	Qatar	Sheikh Khalifa Sports City Hall, Isa Town; Referees: Mohamed, Al-Aradi (BHR)
12 January 2024; 13:00	Chao 9	(11–17)	Marković 6	Sheikh Khalifa Sports City Hall, Isa Town; Referees: Mohamed, Al-Aradi (BHR)
12 January 2024; 13:00	4× (suspension)	Report	3× (suspension)	Sheikh Khalifa Sports City Hall, Isa Town; Referees: Mohamed, Al-Aradi (BHR)

12 January 2024; 17:00	Oman	26–27	Kuwait	Sheikh Khalifa Sports City Hall, Isa Town; Referees: Cheng, Zhou (CHN)
12 January 2024; 17:00	M. Al-Hasani, S. Al-Hasani 5	(11–13)	Ali 7	Sheikh Khalifa Sports City Hall, Isa Town; Referees: Cheng, Zhou (CHN)
12 January 2024; 17:00	4× (suspension)	Report	1× (yellow card) 3× (suspension) 1× (red card)	Sheikh Khalifa Sports City Hall, Isa Town; Referees: Cheng, Zhou (CHN)

14 January 2024; 13:00	Kuwait	31–27	Chinese Taipei	Sheikh Khalifa Sports City Hall, Isa Town; Referees: Furukawa, Murata (JPN)
14 January 2024; 13:00	Al-Hendal 5	(16–13)	Chao 7	Sheikh Khalifa Sports City Hall, Isa Town; Referees: Furukawa, Murata (JPN)
14 January 2024; 13:00	1× (yellow card) 3× (suspension)	Report	5× (suspension) 1× (red card)	Sheikh Khalifa Sports City Hall, Isa Town; Referees: Furukawa, Murata (JPN)

14 January 2024; 17:00	Qatar	28–18	Oman	Sheikh Khalifa Sports City Hall, Isa Town; Referees: Gheisarian, Gheisarian (IRI)
14 January 2024; 17:00	Madadi, Carol 5	(15–7)	H. Al-Dughaishi 8	Sheikh Khalifa Sports City Hall, Isa Town; Referees: Gheisarian, Gheisarian (IRI)
14 January 2024; 17:00	1× (yellow card) 3× (suspension)	Report	1× (yellow card) 5× (suspension)	Sheikh Khalifa Sports City Hall, Isa Town; Referees: Gheisarian, Gheisarian (IRI)

16 January 2024; 15:00	Chinese Taipei	33–27	Oman	Sheikh Khalifa Sports City Hall, Isa Town; Referees: Al-Mawt, Ali (BHR)
16 January 2024; 15:00	Huang 8	(18–10)	S. Al-Hasani 10	Sheikh Khalifa Sports City Hall, Isa Town; Referees: Al-Mawt, Ali (BHR)
16 January 2024; 15:00	7× (suspension)	Report	1× (yellow card) 5× (suspension)	Sheikh Khalifa Sports City Hall, Isa Town; Referees: Al-Mawt, Ali (BHR)

16 January 2024; 17:00	Kuwait	20–24	Qatar	Sheikh Khalifa Sports City Hall, Isa Town; Referees: Koo, Lee (KOR)
16 January 2024; 17:00	three players 3	(8–14)	Tomić 5	Sheikh Khalifa Sports City Hall, Isa Town; Referees: Koo, Lee (KOR)
16 January 2024; 17:00	1× (yellow card) 2× (suspension)	Report	3× (suspension)	Sheikh Khalifa Sports City Hall, Isa Town; Referees: Koo, Lee (KOR)

=== Group B ===
Pos	Team	Pld	W	D	L	GF	GA	GD	Pts	Qualification
1	South Korea	3	3	0	0	100	67	+33	6	Group II
2	Iran	3	2	0	1	88	61	+27	4	Group I
3	China	3	1	0	2	88	69	+19	2	Group IV
4	New Zealand	3	0	0	3	39	118	−79	0	Group III

Source: AHF
Rules for classification: 1) points; 2) head-to-head points; 3) head-to-head goal difference; 4) head-to-head number of goals scored; 5) goal difference.

12 January 2024; 15:00	New Zealand	13–40	Iran	Sheikh Khalifa Sports City Hall, Isa Town; Referees: Al-Dughaishi, Al-Hasani (OMA)
12 January 2024; 15:00	three players 3	(7–20)	Ghalandari 10	Sheikh Khalifa Sports City Hall, Isa Town; Referees: Al-Dughaishi, Al-Hasani (OMA)
12 January 2024; 15:00		Report		Sheikh Khalifa Sports City Hall, Isa Town; Referees: Al-Dughaishi, Al-Hasani (OMA)

12 January 2024; 19:00	China	30–32	South Korea	Sheikh Khalifa Sports City Hall, Isa Town; Referees: Mursch, Carmaux (FRA)
12 January 2024; 19:00	three players 7	(12–12)	Kim Y. 7	Sheikh Khalifa Sports City Hall, Isa Town; Referees: Mursch, Carmaux (FRA)
12 January 2024; 19:00		Report		Sheikh Khalifa Sports City Hall, Isa Town; Referees: Mursch, Carmaux (FRA)

14 January 2024; 15:00	South Korea	42–13	New Zealand	Sheikh Khalifa Sports City Hall, Isa Town; Referees: Ali, Al-Aradi (BHR)
14 January 2024; 15:00	An 9	(20–6)	P. Ireland 5	Sheikh Khalifa Sports City Hall, Isa Town; Referees: Ali, Al-Aradi (BHR)
14 January 2024; 15:00	1× (yellow card) 3× (suspension)	Report	2× (suspension)	Sheikh Khalifa Sports City Hall, Isa Town; Referees: Ali, Al-Aradi (BHR)

14 January 2024; 19:00	Iran	24–22	China	Sheikh Khalifa Sports City Hall, Isa Town; Referees: Ismoilov, Ismoilov (UZB)
14 January 2024; 19:00	Oraei 6	(15–10)	Zhou 7	Sheikh Khalifa Sports City Hall, Isa Town; Referees: Ismoilov, Ismoilov (UZB)
14 January 2024; 19:00	1× (yellow card) 5× (suspension)	Report	1× (yellow card) 3× (suspension)	Sheikh Khalifa Sports City Hall, Isa Town; Referees: Ismoilov, Ismoilov (UZB)

16 January 2024; 13:00	New Zealand	13–36	China	Sheikh Khalifa Sports City Hall, Isa Town; Referees: Al-Wahibi, Al-Shahi (OMA)
16 January 2024; 13:00	P. Ireland 6	(5–19)	Zhao 8	Sheikh Khalifa Sports City Hall, Isa Town; Referees: Al-Wahibi, Al-Shahi (OMA)
16 January 2024; 13:00	1× (suspension)	Report	1× (suspension)	Sheikh Khalifa Sports City Hall, Isa Town; Referees: Al-Wahibi, Al-Shahi (OMA)

16 January 2024; 19:00	South Korea	26–24	Iran	Sheikh Khalifa Sports City Hall, Isa Town; Referees: Furukawa, Murata (JPN)
16 January 2024; 19:00	Kim Y. 9	(10–13)	Norouzinejad 7	Sheikh Khalifa Sports City Hall, Isa Town; Referees: Furukawa, Murata (JPN)
16 January 2024; 19:00	1× (suspension)	Report	1× (yellow card) 5× (suspension)	Sheikh Khalifa Sports City Hall, Isa Town; Referees: Furukawa, Murata (JPN)

=== Group C ===
Pos	Team	Pld	W	D	L	GF	GA	GD	Pts	Qualification
1	Japan	3	2	1	0	116	64	+52	5	Group I
2	Iraq	3	1	2	0	114	71	+43	4	Group II
3	Saudi Arabia	3	1	1	1	104	77	+27	3	Group III
4	India	3	0	0	3	40	162	−122	0	Group IV

Source: AHF
Rules for classification: 1) points; 2) head-to-head points; 3) head-to-head goal difference; 4) head-to-head number of goals scored; 5) goal difference.

11 January 2024; 15:00	India	12–55	Iraq	Sheikh Khalifa Sports City Hall, Isa Town; Referees: Faraj, Taki (KUW)
11 January 2024; 15:00	Sukhveer 7	(4–26)	Hammoodi 10	Sheikh Khalifa Sports City Hall, Isa Town; Referees: Faraj, Taki (KUW)
11 January 2024; 15:00	2× (suspension)	Report	2× (suspension)	Sheikh Khalifa Sports City Hall, Isa Town; Referees: Faraj, Taki (KUW)

11 January 2024; 17:00	Japan	29–25	Saudi Arabia	Sheikh Khalifa Sports City Hall, Isa Town; Referees: Gheisarian, Gheisarian (IRI)
11 January 2024; 17:00	Baig, Yasuhira 6	(13–13)	three players 5	Sheikh Khalifa Sports City Hall, Isa Town; Referees: Gheisarian, Gheisarian (IRI)
11 January 2024; 17:00	1× (yellow card) 8× (suspension) 1× (red card)	Report	5× (suspension) 1× (red card)	Sheikh Khalifa Sports City Hall, Isa Town; Referees: Gheisarian, Gheisarian (IRI)

13 January 2024; 13:00	Saudi Arabia	48–17	India	Sheikh Khalifa Sports City Hall, Isa Town; Referees: Al-Wahibi, Al-Shahi (OMA)
13 January 2024; 13:00	Al-Hulaili 15	(22–8)	Shinde 6	Sheikh Khalifa Sports City Hall, Isa Town; Referees: Al-Wahibi, Al-Shahi (OMA)
13 January 2024; 13:00	1× (suspension)	Report	4× (suspension)	Sheikh Khalifa Sports City Hall, Isa Town; Referees: Al-Wahibi, Al-Shahi (OMA)

13 January 2024; 17:00	Iraq	28–28	Japan	Sheikh Khalifa Sports City Hall, Isa Town; Referees: Ismoilov, Ismoilov (UZB)
13 January 2024; 17:00	M. Abdulridha, Mohammed 6	(15–15)	Kosuke 5	Sheikh Khalifa Sports City Hall, Isa Town; Referees: Ismoilov, Ismoilov (UZB)
13 January 2024; 17:00	1× (yellow card) 2× (suspension)	Report	4× (suspension)	Sheikh Khalifa Sports City Hall, Isa Town; Referees: Ismoilov, Ismoilov (UZB)

15 January 2024; 13:00	Japan	59–11	India	Sheikh Khalifa Sports City Hall, Isa Town; Referees: Faraj, Taqi (KUW)
15 January 2024; 13:00	Sugioka 10	(27–6)	Surender 4	Sheikh Khalifa Sports City Hall, Isa Town; Referees: Faraj, Taqi (KUW)
15 January 2024; 13:00	2× (suspension)	Report	4× (suspension) 1× (red card)	Sheikh Khalifa Sports City Hall, Isa Town; Referees: Faraj, Taqi (KUW)

15 January 2024; 17:00	Iraq	31–31	Saudi Arabia	Sheikh Khalifa Sports City Hall, Isa Town; Referees: Mursch, Carmaux (FRA)
15 January 2024; 17:00	Hammoodi 10	(14–16)	Al-Abbas 6	Sheikh Khalifa Sports City Hall, Isa Town; Referees: Mursch, Carmaux (FRA)
15 January 2024; 17:00	3× (suspension)	Report	5× (suspension)	Sheikh Khalifa Sports City Hall, Isa Town; Referees: Mursch, Carmaux (FRA)

=== Group D ===
Pos	Team	Pld	W	D	L	GF	GA	GD	Pts	Qualification
1	Bahrain (H)	3	3	0	0	128	48	+80	6	Group II
2	United Arab Emirates	3	2	0	1	83	73	+10	4	Group I
3	Kazakhstan	3	1	0	2	55	108	−53	2	Group IV
4	Hong Kong	3	0	0	3	66	103	−37	0	Group III

Source: AHF
Rules for classification: 1) points; 2) head-to-head points; 3) head-to-head goal difference; 4) head-to-head number of goals scored; 5) goal difference.
(H) Hosts

11 January 2024; 13:00	Hong Kong	24–29	United Arab Emirates	Sheikh Khalifa Sports City Hall, Isa Town; Referees: Al-Wahibi, Al-Shahi (OMN)
11 January 2024; 13:00	Tse 4	(11–13)	Al-Maazmi 10	Sheikh Khalifa Sports City Hall, Isa Town; Referees: Al-Wahibi, Al-Shahi (OMN)
11 January 2024; 13:00	2× (suspension)	Report	2× (suspension)	Sheikh Khalifa Sports City Hall, Isa Town; Referees: Al-Wahibi, Al-Shahi (OMN)

11 January 2024; 19:00	Kazakhstan	13–47	Bahrain	Sheikh Khalifa Sports City Hall, Isa Town; Referees: Furukawa, Murata (JPN)
11 January 2024; 19:00	Irismetov 3	(7–24)	Al-Asheeri, Fadhul 8	Sheikh Khalifa Sports City Hall, Isa Town; Referees: Furukawa, Murata (JPN)
11 January 2024; 19:00	1× (suspension)	Report	1× (suspension)	Sheikh Khalifa Sports City Hall, Isa Town; Referees: Furukawa, Murata (JPN)

13 January 2024; 15:00	United Arab Emirates	39–15	Kazakhstan	Sheikh Khalifa Sports City Hall, Isa Town; Referees: Koo, Lee (KOR)
13 January 2024; 15:00	Faramarz 9	(17–5)	Yuldashev 6	Sheikh Khalifa Sports City Hall, Isa Town; Referees: Koo, Lee (KOR)
13 January 2024; 15:00	1× (suspension)	Report	4× (suspension)	Sheikh Khalifa Sports City Hall, Isa Town; Referees: Koo, Lee (KOR)

13 January 2024; 19:00	Bahrain	47–20	Hong Kong	Sheikh Khalifa Sports City Hall, Isa Town; Referees: Faraj, Taqi (KUW)
13 January 2024; 19:00	Kadhem 7	(25–8)	Kan 6	Sheikh Khalifa Sports City Hall, Isa Town; Referees: Faraj, Taqi (KUW)
13 January 2024; 19:00	3× (suspension)	Report	3× (suspension)	Sheikh Khalifa Sports City Hall, Isa Town; Referees: Faraj, Taqi (KUW)

15 January 2024; 15:00	Kazakhstan	27–22	Hong Kong	Sheikh Khalifa Sports City Hall, Isa Town; Referees: Al-Dughaishi, Ali Al-Hasani (OMA)
15 January 2024; 15:00	Melnichenko 8	(12–11)	Lin 5	Sheikh Khalifa Sports City Hall, Isa Town; Referees: Al-Dughaishi, Ali Al-Hasani (OMA)
15 January 2024; 15:00	5× (suspension)	Report	1× (suspension)	Sheikh Khalifa Sports City Hall, Isa Town; Referees: Al-Dughaishi, Ali Al-Hasani (OMA)

15 January 2024; 19:00	Bahrain	34–15	United Arab Emirates	Sheikh Khalifa Sports City Hall, Isa Town; Referees: Cheng, Zhou (CHN)
15 January 2024; 19:00	Qambar 7	(19–8)	Al-Mutawa 5	Sheikh Khalifa Sports City Hall, Isa Town; Referees: Cheng, Zhou (CHN)
15 January 2024; 19:00	1× (yellow card) 5× (suspension)	Report	1× (yellow card) 3× (suspension) 1× (red card)	Sheikh Khalifa Sports City Hall, Isa Town; Referees: Cheng, Zhou (CHN)

== Martyr Fahad Al-Ahmad Al-Sabah Cup ==
=== Group III ===
Pos	Team	Pld	W	D	L	GF	GA	GD	Pts	Qualification
1	Saudi Arabia	3	3	0	0	118	74	+44	6	Ninth place game
2	Chinese Taipei	3	2	0	1	104	69	+35	4	Eleventh place game
3	Hong Kong	3	1	0	2	74	104	−30	2	13th place game
4	New Zealand	3	0	0	3	69	118	−49	0	15th place game

Source: AHF
Rules for classification: 1) points; 2) head-to-head points; 3) head-to-head goal difference; 4) head-to-head number of goals scored; 5) goal difference.

18 January 2024; 15:00	Saudi Arabia	46–27	New Zealand	Bahrain Handball Federation Hall, Manama; Referees: Al-Dughaishi, Al-Hasani (OMA)
18 January 2024; 15:00	Al-Turaiki 8	(21–16)	P. Ireland, Naylor 6	Bahrain Handball Federation Hall, Manama; Referees: Al-Dughaishi, Al-Hasani (OMA)
18 January 2024; 15:00	2× (suspension)	Report	2× (suspension)	Bahrain Handball Federation Hall, Manama; Referees: Al-Dughaishi, Al-Hasani (OMA)

18 January 2024; 19:00	Hong Kong	19–40	Chinese Taipei	Bahrain Handball Federation Hall, Manama; Referees: Gheisarian, Gheisarian (IRI)
18 January 2024; 19:00	Tse 4	(10–19)	Huang 6	Bahrain Handball Federation Hall, Manama; Referees: Gheisarian, Gheisarian (IRI)
18 January 2024; 19:00	5× (suspension)	Report	6× (suspension)	Bahrain Handball Federation Hall, Manama; Referees: Gheisarian, Gheisarian (IRI)

19 January 2024; 15:00	Hong Kong	36–25	New Zealand	Bahrain Handball Federation Hall, Manama; Referees: Ali, Al-Aradi (BHR)
19 January 2024; 15:00	Lin 10	(18–13)	Lang 7	Bahrain Handball Federation Hall, Manama; Referees: Ali, Al-Aradi (BHR)
19 January 2024; 15:00	5× (suspension)	Report	4× (suspension)	Bahrain Handball Federation Hall, Manama; Referees: Ali, Al-Aradi (BHR)

19 January 2024; 19:00	Saudi Arabia	33–28	Chinese Taipei	Bahrain Handball Federation Hall, Manama; Referees: Ismoilov, Ismoilov (UZB)
19 January 2024; 19:00	Al-Abbas 7	(14–17)	Pen 5	Bahrain Handball Federation Hall, Manama; Referees: Ismoilov, Ismoilov (UZB)
19 January 2024; 19:00	1× (yellow card) 3× (suspension)	Report	3× (suspension)	Bahrain Handball Federation Hall, Manama; Referees: Ismoilov, Ismoilov (UZB)

21 January 2024; 15:00	Saudi Arabia	39–19	Hong Kong	Bahrain Handball Federation Hall, Manama; Referees: Furukawa, Murata (JPN)
21 January 2024; 15:00	Al-Hulaili 11	(17–8)	Chan 4	Bahrain Handball Federation Hall, Manama; Referees: Furukawa, Murata (JPN)
21 January 2024; 15:00	2× (suspension)	Report	2× (suspension)	Bahrain Handball Federation Hall, Manama; Referees: Furukawa, Murata (JPN)

21 January 2024; 19:00	Chinese Taipei	36–17	New Zealand	Bahrain Handball Federation Hall, Manama; Referees: Al-Dughaishi, Al-Hasani (OMA)
21 January 2024; 19:00	Chen H. 7	(19–8)	Burden, Naylor 4	Bahrain Handball Federation Hall, Manama; Referees: Al-Dughaishi, Al-Hasani (OMA)
21 January 2024; 19:00	3× (suspension)	Report	5× (suspension)	Bahrain Handball Federation Hall, Manama; Referees: Al-Dughaishi, Al-Hasani (OMA)

=== Group IV ===
Pos	Team	Pld	W	D	L	GF	GA	GD	Pts	Qualification
1	China	3	3	0	0	112	71	+41	6	Ninth place game
2	Oman	3	2	0	1	99	79	+20	4	Eleventh place game
3	Kazakhstan	3	1	0	2	78	97	−19	2	13th place game
4	India	3	0	0	3	76	118	−42	0	15th place game

Source: AHF
Rules for classification: 1) points; 2) head-to-head points; 3) head-to-head goal difference; 4) head-to-head number of goals scored; 5) goal difference.

18 January 2024; 13:00	India	25–46	China	Bahrain Handball Federation Hall, Manama; Referees: Ali, Al-Aradi (BHR)
18 January 2024; 13:00	Sukhveer 8	(14–20)	Zhou 9	Bahrain Handball Federation Hall, Manama; Referees: Ali, Al-Aradi (BHR)
18 January 2024; 13:00	2× (suspension)	Report	4× (suspension)	Bahrain Handball Federation Hall, Manama; Referees: Ali, Al-Aradi (BHR)

18 January 2024; 17:00	Kazakhstan	29–30	Oman	Bahrain Handball Federation Hall, Manama; Referees: Cheng, Zhou (CHN)
18 January 2024; 17:00	Tilekkabyl 7	(17–16)	S. Al-Hasani 8	Bahrain Handball Federation Hall, Manama; Referees: Cheng, Zhou (CHN)
18 January 2024; 17:00	1× (yellow card) 3× (suspension) 1× (red card)	Report	1× (suspension)	Bahrain Handball Federation Hall, Manama; Referees: Cheng, Zhou (CHN)

19 January 2024; 13:00	Kazakhstan	24–43	China	Bahrain Handball Federation Hall, Manama; Referees: Gheisarian, Gheisarian (IRI)
19 January 2024; 13:00	Gaziyev 7	(10–23)	Song, Ji 6	Bahrain Handball Federation Hall, Manama; Referees: Gheisarian, Gheisarian (IRI)
19 January 2024; 13:00	1× (yellow card) 2× (suspension)	Report	1× (yellow card) 3× (suspension)	Bahrain Handball Federation Hall, Manama; Referees: Gheisarian, Gheisarian (IRI)

19 January 2024; 17:00	India	27–47	Oman	Bahrain Handball Federation Hall, Manama; Referees: Faraj, Taqi (KUW)
19 January 2024; 17:00	Sukhveer 7	(15–25)	M. Al-Dughaishi 12	Bahrain Handball Federation Hall, Manama; Referees: Faraj, Taqi (KUW)
19 January 2024; 17:00	2× (suspension)	Report	4× (suspension)	Bahrain Handball Federation Hall, Manama; Referees: Faraj, Taqi (KUW)

21 January 2024; 13:00	India	24–25	Kazakhstan	Bahrain Handball Federation Hall, Manama; Referees: Ali, Al-Aradi (BHR)
21 January 2024; 13:00	Rohitash 10	(14–16)	Tilekkabyl 8	Bahrain Handball Federation Hall, Manama; Referees: Ali, Al-Aradi (BHR)
21 January 2024; 13:00	2× (suspension)	Report	1× (yellow card) 4× (suspension)	Bahrain Handball Federation Hall, Manama; Referees: Ali, Al-Aradi (BHR)

21 January 2024; 17:00	Oman	22–23	China	Bahrain Handball Federation Hall, Manama; Referees: Al-Mawt, Marhoon (BHR)
21 January 2024; 17:00	S. Al-Hasani 6	(14–12)	Ji, Zhou 6	Bahrain Handball Federation Hall, Manama; Referees: Al-Mawt, Marhoon (BHR)
21 January 2024; 17:00	1× (yellow card) 5× (suspension) 1× (red card)	Report	2× (yellow card) 5× (suspension)	Bahrain Handball Federation Hall, Manama; Referees: Al-Mawt, Marhoon (BHR)

=== 15th place game ===
22 January 2024; 11:00	India	31–36	New Zealand	Sheikh Khalifa Sports City Hall, Isa Town; Referees: Faraj, Taqi (KUW)
22 January 2024; 11:00	Sukhveer 10	(14–18)	P. Ireland 9	Sheikh Khalifa Sports City Hall, Isa Town; Referees: Faraj, Taqi (KUW)
22 January 2024; 11:00	4× (suspension) 1× (red card)	Report	7× (suspension) 1× (red card)	Sheikh Khalifa Sports City Hall, Isa Town; Referees: Faraj, Taqi (KUW)

=== 13th place game ===
22 January 2024; 13:00	Kazakhstan	32–35	Hong Kong	Sheikh Khalifa Sports City Hall, Isa Town; Referees: Al-Dughaishi, Al-Hasani (OMA)
22 January 2024; 13:00	Tilekkabyl 9	(18–15)	Wong K. 8	Sheikh Khalifa Sports City Hall, Isa Town; Referees: Al-Dughaishi, Al-Hasani (OMA)
22 January 2024; 13:00	2× (suspension)	Report	1× (yellow card) 2× (suspension)	Sheikh Khalifa Sports City Hall, Isa Town; Referees: Al-Dughaishi, Al-Hasani (OMA)

=== Eleventh place game ===
22 January 2024; 15:00	Oman	27–33	Chinese Taipei	Sheikh Khalifa Sports City Hall, Isa Town; Referees: Ali, Al-Aradi (BHR)
22 January 2024; 15:00	Asad S. Al-Hasani 7	(12–13)	Chao, Chen 6	Sheikh Khalifa Sports City Hall, Isa Town; Referees: Ali, Al-Aradi (BHR)
22 January 2024; 15:00	8× (suspension)	Report	2× (suspension)	Sheikh Khalifa Sports City Hall, Isa Town; Referees: Ali, Al-Aradi (BHR)

=== Ninth place game ===
23 January 2024; 14:00	China	21–25	Saudi Arabia	Sheikh Khalifa Sports City Hall, Isa Town; Referees: Furukawa, Murata (JPN)
23 January 2024; 14:00	Hu, Zhou 4	(12–14)	Mohab 6	Sheikh Khalifa Sports City Hall, Isa Town; Referees: Furukawa, Murata (JPN)
23 January 2024; 14:00	5× (suspension)	Report	1× (yellow card) 3× (suspension)	Sheikh Khalifa Sports City Hall, Isa Town; Referees: Furukawa, Murata (JPN)

== Main round ==
=== Group I ===
Pos	Team	Pld	W	D	L	GF	GA	GD	Pts	Qualification
1	Qatar	3	2	1	0	80	72	+8	5 (Note: Japan 28–28 Qatar)	Semifinals
2	Japan	3	2	1	0	82	77	+5	5	Semifinals
3	Iran	3	1	0	2	71	74	−3	2	Fifth place game
4	United Arab Emirates	3	0	0	3	69	79	−10	0	Seventh place game

Source: AHF
Rules for classification: 1) points; 2) head-to-head points; 3) head-to-head goal difference; 4) head-to-head number of goals scored; 5) goal difference.
Notes:

18 January 2024; 15:00	Japan	25–23	Iran	Sheikh Khalifa Sports City Hall, Isa Town; Referees: Koo, Lee (KOR)
18 January 2024; 15:00	Motoki 6	(11–12)	Norouzinejad 6	Sheikh Khalifa Sports City Hall, Isa Town; Referees: Koo, Lee (KOR)
18 January 2024; 15:00	1× (suspension)	Report	2× (yellow card) 2× (suspension) 1× (red card)	Sheikh Khalifa Sports City Hall, Isa Town; Referees: Koo, Lee (KOR)

18 January 2024; 17:00	United Arab Emirates	21–25	Qatar	Sheikh Khalifa Sports City Hall, Isa Town; Referees: Faraj, Taqi (KUW)
18 January 2024; 17:00	Al-Mheiri, Al-Mutawa 5	(12–8)	Marzo 7	Sheikh Khalifa Sports City Hall, Isa Town; Referees: Faraj, Taqi (KUW)
18 January 2024; 17:00	4× (suspension)	Report	4× (suspension) 2× (red card)	Sheikh Khalifa Sports City Hall, Isa Town; Referees: Faraj, Taqi (KUW)

19 January 2024; 13:00	Qatar	27–23	Iran	Sheikh Khalifa Sports City Hall, Isa Town; Referees: Al-Wahibi, Al-Shahi (OMA)
19 January 2024; 13:00	Marzo 9	(15–13)	Heidarpour 7	Sheikh Khalifa Sports City Hall, Isa Town; Referees: Al-Wahibi, Al-Shahi (OMA)
19 January 2024; 13:00	2× (suspension) 1× (red card)	Report	4× (suspension)	Sheikh Khalifa Sports City Hall, Isa Town; Referees: Al-Wahibi, Al-Shahi (OMA)

19 January 2024; 17:00	Japan	29–26	United Arab Emirates	Sheikh Khalifa Sports City Hall, Isa Town; Referees: Al-Mawt, Marhoon (BHR)
19 January 2024; 17:00	Baig, Motoki 7	(13–16)	Al-Maazmi 10	Sheikh Khalifa Sports City Hall, Isa Town; Referees: Al-Mawt, Marhoon (BHR)
19 January 2024; 17:00	1× (yellow card) 3× (suspension)	Report	1× (yellow card) 4× (suspension) 1× (red card)	Sheikh Khalifa Sports City Hall, Isa Town; Referees: Al-Mawt, Marhoon (BHR)

21 January 2024; 13:00	United Arab Emirates	22–25	Iran	Sheikh Khalifa Sports City Hall, Isa Town; Referees: Koo, Lee (KOR)
21 January 2024; 13:00	Al-Hammadi 5	(13–10)	Ezati, Taheri 5	Sheikh Khalifa Sports City Hall, Isa Town; Referees: Koo, Lee (KOR)
21 January 2024; 13:00	1× (yellow card) 2× (suspension)	Report	1× (suspension)	Sheikh Khalifa Sports City Hall, Isa Town; Referees: Koo, Lee (KOR)

21 January 2024; 17:00	Japan	28–28	Qatar	Sheikh Khalifa Sports City Hall, Isa Town; Referees: Gheisarian, Gheisarian (IRI)
21 January 2024; 17:00	Tokuda 6	(12–16)	Benali 7	Sheikh Khalifa Sports City Hall, Isa Town; Referees: Gheisarian, Gheisarian (IRI)
21 January 2024; 17:00	1× (yellow card) 6× (suspension)	Report	3× (suspension)	Sheikh Khalifa Sports City Hall, Isa Town; Referees: Gheisarian, Gheisarian (IRI)

=== Group II ===
Pos	Team	Pld	W	D	L	GF	GA	GD	Pts	Qualification
1	Bahrain (H)	3	2	1	0	86	77	+9	5	Semifinals
2	Kuwait	3	1	2	0	87	75	+12	4	Semifinals
3	South Korea	3	0	2	1	78	82	−4	2	Fifth place game
4	Iraq	3	0	1	2	62	79	−17	1	Seventh place game

Source: AHF
Rules for classification: 1) points; 2) head-to-head points; 3) head-to-head goal difference; 4) head-to-head number of goals scored; 5) goal difference.
(H) Hosts

18 January 2024; 13:00	Iraq	22–22	South Korea	Sheikh Khalifa Sports City Hall, Isa Town; Referees: Ismoilov, Ismoilov (UZB)
18 January 2024; 13:00	Hammoodi 8	(11–11)	Kim Y. 8	Sheikh Khalifa Sports City Hall, Isa Town; Referees: Ismoilov, Ismoilov (UZB)
18 January 2024; 13:00	1× (yellow card) 3× (suspension)	Report	1× (suspension)	Sheikh Khalifa Sports City Hall, Isa Town; Referees: Ismoilov, Ismoilov (UZB)

18 January 2024; 19:00	Bahrain	28–28	Kuwait	Sheikh Khalifa Sports City Hall, Isa Town; Referees: Mursch, Carmaux (FRA)
18 January 2024; 19:00	Naser 7	(16–18)	Al-Khamees, Ali 5	Sheikh Khalifa Sports City Hall, Isa Town; Referees: Mursch, Carmaux (FRA)
18 January 2024; 19:00	3× (suspension)	Report	1× (yellow card) 4× (suspension)	Sheikh Khalifa Sports City Hall, Isa Town; Referees: Mursch, Carmaux (FRA)

19 January 2024; 15:00	Kuwait	27–27	South Korea	Sheikh Khalifa Sports City Hall, Isa Town; Referees: Furukawa, Murata (JPN)
19 January 2024; 15:00	Al-Hendal 5	(10–12)	Kim Y. 7	Sheikh Khalifa Sports City Hall, Isa Town; Referees: Furukawa, Murata (JPN)
19 January 2024; 15:00	1× (yellow card) 5× (suspension)	Report	1× (yellow card) 3× (suspension) 1× (red card)	Sheikh Khalifa Sports City Hall, Isa Town; Referees: Furukawa, Murata (JPN)

19 January 2024; 19:00	Iraq	20–25	Bahrain	Sheikh Khalifa Sports City Hall, Isa Town; Referees: Cheng, Zhou (CHN)
19 January 2024; 19:00	Hafedh 9	(10–13)	Naser 8	Sheikh Khalifa Sports City Hall, Isa Town; Referees: Cheng, Zhou (CHN)
19 January 2024; 19:00	2× (suspension)	Report	1× (yellow card) 3× (suspension)	Sheikh Khalifa Sports City Hall, Isa Town; Referees: Cheng, Zhou (CHN)

21 January 2024; 15:00	Iraq	20–32	Kuwait	Sheikh Khalifa Sports City Hall, Isa Town; Referees: Mursch, Carmaux (FRA)
21 January 2024; 15:00	Hafedh 7	(6–13)	three players 5	Sheikh Khalifa Sports City Hall, Isa Town; Referees: Mursch, Carmaux (FRA)
21 January 2024; 15:00	3× (suspension)	Report	3× (suspension)	Sheikh Khalifa Sports City Hall, Isa Town; Referees: Mursch, Carmaux (FRA)

21 January 2024; 19:00	Bahrain	33–29	South Korea	Sheikh Khalifa Sports City Hall, Isa Town; Referees: Ismoilov, Ismoilov (UZB)
21 January 2024; 19:00	Al-Sayyad 10	(17–14)	Kang 7	Sheikh Khalifa Sports City Hall, Isa Town; Referees: Ismoilov, Ismoilov (UZB)
21 January 2024; 19:00	5× (suspension) 1× (red card)	Report	1× (yellow card) 2× (suspension)	Sheikh Khalifa Sports City Hall, Isa Town; Referees: Ismoilov, Ismoilov (UZB)

== Final round ==
=== Bracket ===
Semi-finals
23 January
Qatar	33
Kuwait	26
23 January
Bahrain	17
Japan	20

Final
25 January
Qatar	30
Japan	24
Third place
25 January
Kuwait	17
Bahrain	26

=== Semifinals ===
23 January 2024; 16:00	Qatar	33–26	Kuwait	Sheikh Khalifa Sports City Hall, Isa Town; Referees: Ismoilov, Ismoilov (UZB)
23 January 2024; 16:00	Carol 7	(17–11)	Ali 7	Sheikh Khalifa Sports City Hall, Isa Town; Referees: Ismoilov, Ismoilov (UZB)
23 January 2024; 16:00	3× (suspension) 1× (red card)	Report	1× (yellow card) 1× (suspension)	Sheikh Khalifa Sports City Hall, Isa Town; Referees: Ismoilov, Ismoilov (UZB)

23 January 2024; 18:30	Bahrain	17–20	Japan	Sheikh Khalifa Sports City Hall, Isa Town; Referees: Koo, Lee (KOR)
23 January 2024; 18:30	Al-Sayyad, Habib 5	(11–9)	Tsutaya 6	Sheikh Khalifa Sports City Hall, Isa Town; Referees: Koo, Lee (KOR)
23 January 2024; 18:30	1× (yellow card) 5× (suspension)	Report	2× (yellow card) 3× (suspension) 1× (red card)	Sheikh Khalifa Sports City Hall, Isa Town; Referees: Koo, Lee (KOR)

=== Seventh place game ===
22 January 2024; 17:00	United Arab Emirates	28–23	Iraq	Sheikh Khalifa Sports City Hall, Isa Town; Referees: Al-Wahibi, Al-Shahi (OMN)
22 January 2024; 17:00	Al-Maazmi 6	(15–13)	Hafedh 5	Sheikh Khalifa Sports City Hall, Isa Town; Referees: Al-Wahibi, Al-Shahi (OMN)
22 January 2024; 17:00	2× (suspension)	Report	4× (suspension)	Sheikh Khalifa Sports City Hall, Isa Town; Referees: Al-Wahibi, Al-Shahi (OMN)

=== Fifth place game ===
22 January 2024; 19:00	Iran	26–27	South Korea	Sheikh Khalifa Sports City Hall, Isa Town; Referees: Al-Mawt, Marhoon (BHR)
22 January 2024; 19:00	four players 4	(13–16)	An, Song 5	Sheikh Khalifa Sports City Hall, Isa Town; Referees: Al-Mawt, Marhoon (BHR)
22 January 2024; 19:00	2× (yellow card) 3× (suspension)	Report	1× (yellow card) 4× (suspension)	Sheikh Khalifa Sports City Hall, Isa Town; Referees: Al-Mawt, Marhoon (BHR)

=== Third place game ===
25 January 2024; 16:00	Kuwait	17–26	Bahrain	Sheikh Khalifa Sports City Hall, Isa Town; Referees: Cheng, Zhou (CHN)
25 January 2024; 16:00	Al-Khamees 5	(6–12)	Eid 9	Sheikh Khalifa Sports City Hall, Isa Town; Referees: Cheng, Zhou (CHN)
25 January 2024; 16:00	2× (yellow card) 5× (suspension)	Report	1× (yellow card) 3× (suspension)	Sheikh Khalifa Sports City Hall, Isa Town; Referees: Cheng, Zhou (CHN)

=== Final ===
25 January 2024; 18:30	Qatar	30–24	Japan	Sheikh Khalifa Sports City Hall, Isa Town; Referees: Mursch, Carmaux (FRA)
25 January 2024; 18:30	Marković 7	(17–11)	Tsutaya, Yoshida 5	Sheikh Khalifa Sports City Hall, Isa Town; Referees: Mursch, Carmaux (FRA)
25 January 2024; 18:30	2× (suspension)	Report	1× (yellow card) 1× (suspension) 1× (red card)	Sheikh Khalifa Sports City Hall, Isa Town; Referees: Mursch, Carmaux (FRA)

== Final ranking ==
Rank	Team
1st place, gold medalist(s)	Qatar
2nd place, silver medalist(s)	Japan
3rd place, bronze medalist(s)	Bahrain
4	Kuwait
5	South Korea
6	Iran
7	United Arab Emirates
8	Iraq
9	Saudi Arabia
10	China
11	Chinese Taipei
12	Oman
13	Hong Kong
14	Kazakhstan
15	New Zealand
16	India

Qualified for the 2025 World Men's Handball Championship

== All-star team ==
The All-star Team was announced on 27 January 2024.

Position	Player
Goalkeeper	(Qatar) Anadin Suljaković
Left wing	(Bahrain) Hasan Al-Samahiji
Left back	(Kuwait) Abdoullah Al Khamees
Centre back	(Bahrain) Mohamed Habib Naser
Right back	(Japan) Adam Yuki Baig
Right wing	(Kuwait) Saleh Ali
Pivot	(Japan) Shuichi Yoshida
MVP	(Qatar) Moustafa Heiba
