= Adam Yuki Baig =

Japanese handball player (born 1999)

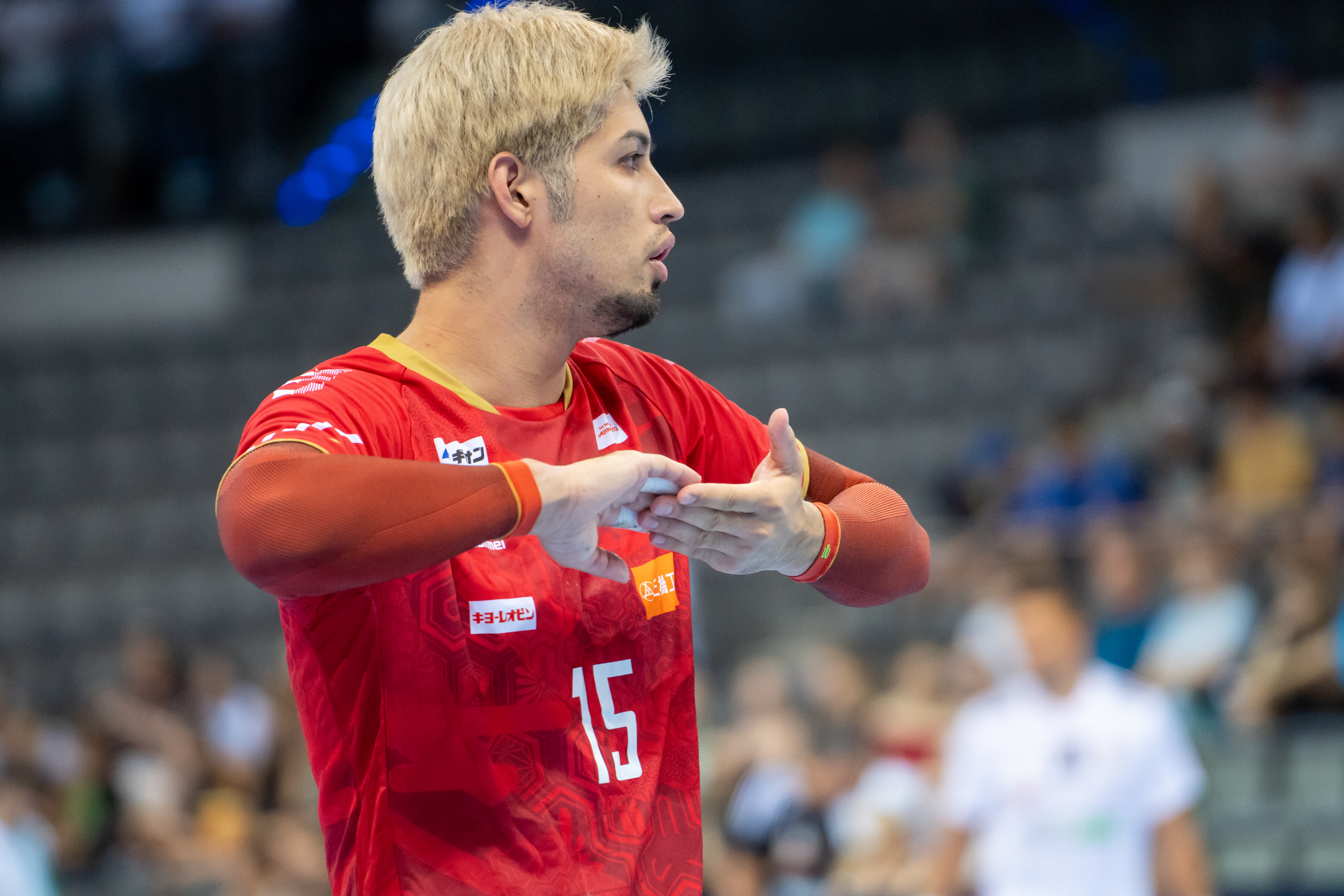

Personal information
- Nationality: Japanese
- Born: 12 April 1999 (age 27)
- Height: 1.94 m (6 ft 4 in)

Sport
- Sport: Handball
- Position: Left back
- Current club: Zeekstar Tokyo

Senior clubs
- Years: Team
- 2017–2019: Cesson Rennes MHB
- 2019–2020: Saran Loiret Handball
- 2020–: Zeekstar Tokyo
National team
Years	Team	Apps	(Gls)
–	Japan	20	(36)
Medal record
Asian Championship
Silver medal – second place	2024 Bahrain
Bronze medal – third place	2020 Kuwait

Adam Yuki Baig (born 12 April 1999) is a Japanese handball player for Zeekstar Tokyo and the Japanese national team.

He represented Japan at the 2019 World Men's Handball Championship.

== Personal life ==
Baig was born in Japan to a Pakistani father and Japanese mother.
