= Jovo Damjanović =

Montenegrin-Qatari handball player (born 1996)

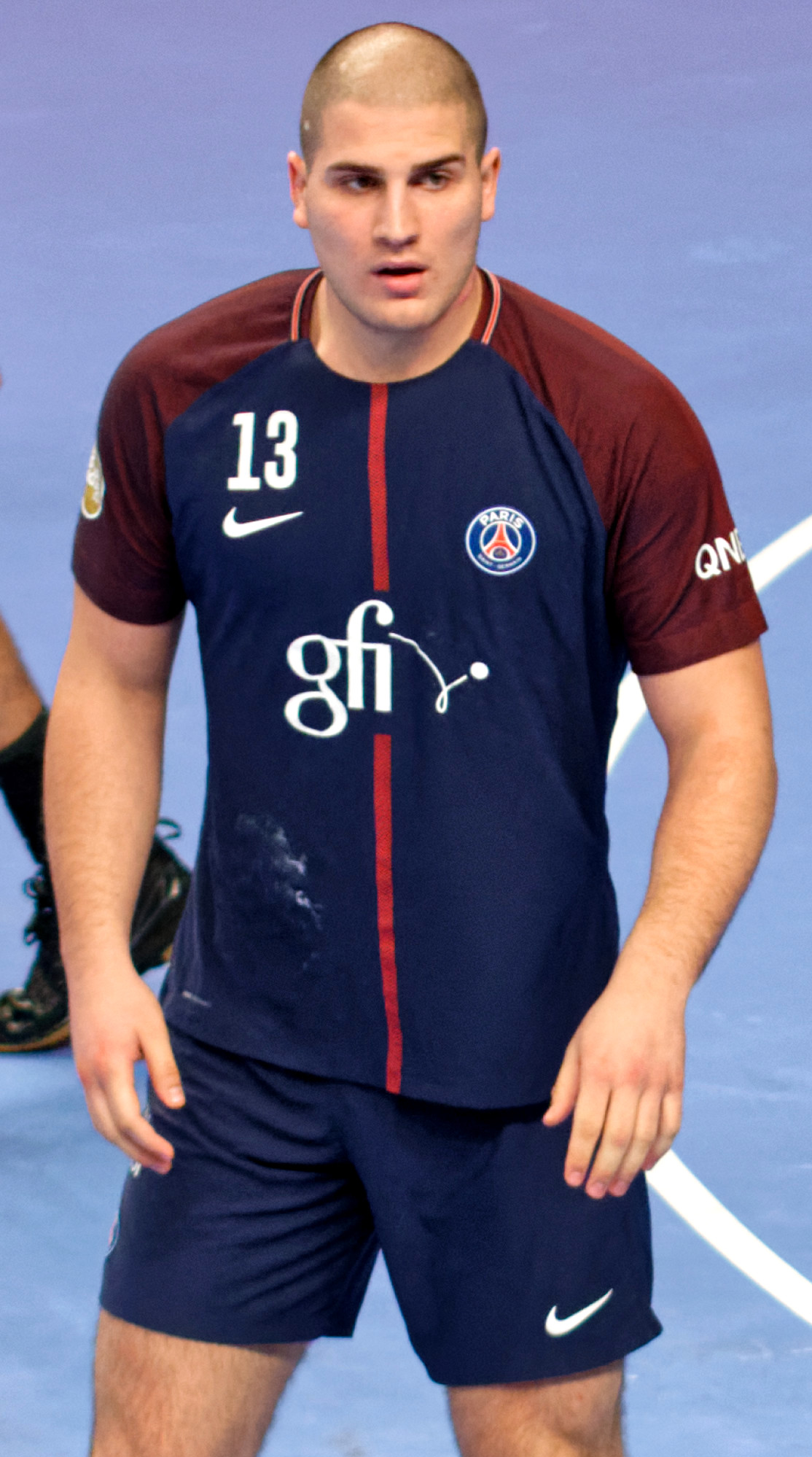
- Damjanović in 2017

Personal information
- Full name: Jovo Damjanović
- Nationality: Montenegrin / Qatari
- Born: 24 December 1996 (age 29) Nikšić, FR Yugoslavia
- Height: 1.99 m (6 ft 6 in)

Sport
- Sport: Handball
- Position: Pivot
- Current club: Al Rayyan
- Number: 2

Youth career
- Years: Team
- 2011-2013: Sutjeska Nikšić

Senior clubs
- Years: Team
- 2013-2017: El Jaish SC
- 2017-2018: PSG Handball
- 2018-: RK Železničar 1949
National team
- Years: Team
- 2013–: Qatar
Medal record
Men's handball
Representing Qatar
World Championship
Silver medal – second place	2015 Qatar

Jovo Damjanović (Montenegrin: Јово Дамјановић; born 24 December 1996) is a Montenegrin-born Qatari handball player for Qatari Al-Rayyan and Qatar.

== Club career ==
In October 2011, at age 14, Damjanović made his senior debut for Sutjeska Nikšić. He spent two seasons with the club before signing with Qatari team El Jaish in May 2013. In August 2017, Damjanović returned to Europe and signed with Paris Saint-Germain on a two-year contract.

== International career ==
A former Montenegro youth international, Damjanović represented Qatar at the 2015 World Championship, as the team finished as runners-up. This was the first World Championship medal for both Qatar and for any Asian team. The result was however controversial due to the many naturalized players of Qatar, of which Fernández was one of them. According to the Frankfurter Allgemeine, only four of the 17 players in the squad were native to Qatar. The practice was criticised by Austrian goalkeeper after his team's loss to Qatar in the round of 16, saying "It [felt] like playing against a world selection team" and "I think it is not the sense of a world championship." Furthermore there were claims of favourable refereering for the hosts. After the final whistle of their semifinal against Poland, the Polish players showed their discontent by ironically applauding the three referees.

He also participated at the 2017 World Under-21 Championship.

== Honours ==
El Jaish

- Asian Club League Handball Championship: 2014

Paris Saint-Germain

- LNH Division 1: 2017–18
