= Hamdi Ayed =

Qatari handball player (born 1993)

Personal information
- Nationality: Qatari
- Born: 16 August 1993 (age 33)
- Height: 1.78 m (5 ft 10 in)

Sport
- Sport: Handball
- Position: Left wing
- Current club: Al Rayyan
- Number: 92
National team
Years	Team	Apps	(Gls)
–	Qatar	37	(102)
Medal record
Men's handball
Representing Qatar
Islamic Solidarity Games
Gold medal – first place	2021 Konya

Hamdi Ayed (born 16 August 1993) is a Qatari handball player for Al Rayyan and the Qatari national team.

He represented Qatar at the 2019 World Men's Handball Championship.
