= Rayan Aribi =

Tunisian handball player

Rayan Laribi
Personal information
- Full name: Rayan Aribi
- Born: July 29, 1987 (age 39) Hammamet, Tunisia
- Height: 1.80 m (5 ft 11 in)

Sport
- Sport: Handball
- Position: Right Wing
- Current club: Al Rayyan
- Number: 39

Senior clubs
- Years: Team
- –2009: AS Hammamet
- 2009–2012: Étoile Sportive du Sahel
- 2012–2013: Al-Wakrah SC
- 2013–: Al Rayyan
National team
Years	Team	Apps	(Gls)
–	Tunisia	40	(22)

Rayan Aribi
Medal record

Men's handball

Representing Tunisia

Rayan Aribi (born July 29, 1987) is a Tunisian handball player. He was born in Hammamet.

== Honours ==
=== Club ===
African Champions League

- Winner: 2010 Casablanca
- Runners-up: 2011 Kaduna

African Cup Winners' Cup

- Winner: 2012 Tunis

African Super Cup

- Runners-up: 2011 Yaoundé

Tunisian Handball League

- (gold) Winner: 2011

Tunisia National Cup

- (gold) Winner: 2010

=== Individual ===
- Best scorer in the 2013 Super Globe (35 goals).
