= 1997 IHF Super Globe =

Tournament details
- Host country: Austria
- Venue(s): 1 (in 1 host city)
- Dates: 3 – 8 January 1997
- Teams: 8 (from 4 confederations)

Final positions
- Champions: (Spain) Caja Cantabria de Santander (1st title)
- Runner-up: (Norway) Drammen HK
- Third place: (South Korea) Doosan Kyung Wol Seoul
- Fourth place: (Austria) HC Sparkasse Bruck

Tournament statistics
- Matches played: 18
- Goals scored: 918 (51 per match)

The 1997 IHF Super Globe was the first edition of the tournament. It was held in Wiener Neustadt, Austria at from 3 – 8 January 1997.

Caja Cantabria de Santander defeated Drammen HK in an all-European final by 30–29.

== Teams ==
Group A	Group B
(Brazil) Metodista São Paulo (South Korea) Doosan Kyung Wol Seoul (Spain) Caja Cantabria de Santander (Morocco) KAC Marrakech	(Austria) HC Sparkasse Bruck (Japan) Osaki Denki Tokyo (Algeria) MC Algier (Norway) Drammen HK

== Preliminary round ==
Legend
Qualified for the semifinals

=== Group A ===
Team	Pld	W	D	L	GF	GA	GD	Pts
(Spain) Caja Cantabria	3	3	0	0	87	62	+25	6
(South Korea) Doosan Kyung Wol Seoul	3	2	0	1	71	72	−1	4
(Brazil) Metodista São Paulo	3	0	1	2	71	79	−8	1
(Morocco) KAC Marrakech	3	0	1	2	61	77	−16	1

3 January 1997	Metodista São Paulo (Brazil)	25–26	(South Korea) Doosan K. W. Seoul	Wiener Neustadt

3 January 1997	Caja Cantabria (Spain)	29–19	(Morocco) KAC Marrakech	Wiener Neustadt

4 January 1997	Metodista São Paulo (Brazil)	22–29	(Spain) Caja Cantabria	Wiener Neustadt

4 January 1997	KAC Marrakech (Morocco)	18–24	(South Korea) Doosan K. W. Seoul	Wiener Neustadt

5 January 1997	KAC Marrakech (Morocco)	24–24	(Brazil) Metodista São Paulo	Wiener Neustadt

5 January 1997	Doosan K. W. Seoul (South Korea)	21–29	(Spain) Caja Cantabria	Wiener Neustadt

=== Group B ===
Team	Pld	W	D	L	GF	GA	GD	Pts
(Norway) Drammen HK	3	3	0	0	89	74	+15	6
(Austria) HC Sparkasse Bruck	3	2	0	1	87	77	+10	4
(Japan) Osaki Denki Tokyo	3	0	1	2	65	77	−12	1
(Algeria) MC Algier	3	0	1	2	63	76	−13	1

3 January 1997	HC Sparkasse Bruck (Austria)	30 – 20	(Japan) Osaki Denki Tokyo	Wiener Neustadt

3 January 1997	Drammen HK (Norway)	30 – 18	(Algeria) MC Algier	Wiener Neustadt

4 January 1997	HC Sparkasse Bruck (Austria)	29 – 30	(Norway) Drammen HK	Wiener Neustadt

4 January 1997	MC Algier (Algeria)	18 – 18	(Japan) Osaki Denki Tokyo	Wiener Neustadt

5 January 1997	MC Algier (Algeria)	27 – 28	(Austria) HC Sparkasse Bruck	Wiener Neustadt

5 January 1997	Osaki Denki Tokyo (Japan)	27 – 29	(Norway) Drammen HK	Wiener Neustadt

== Knockout stage ==
=== Championship bracket ===
Semi-finals
7 January 1997
(Spain) Caja Cantabria	35
(Austria) HC Sparkasse Bruck	16
7 January 1997
(Norway) Drammen HK	32
(South Korea) Doosan K. W. Seoul	27

Final
8 January 1997
(Spain) Caja Cantabria	30
(Norway) Drammen HK	29
Third place
8 January 1997
(Austria) HC Sparkasse Bruck	27
(South Korea) Doosan K. W. Seoul	33

=== 7th–8th-place match ===
7 January 1997	KAC Marrakech (Morocco)	21 – 25	(Algeria) MC Algier	Wiener Neustadt

=== 5th–6th-place match ===
7 January 1997	Osaki Denki Tokyo (Japan)	27 – 22	(Brazil) Metodista São Paulo	Wiener Neustadt

=== Semifinal matches ===
7 January 1997	Caja Cantabria (Spain)	35 – 16	(Austria) HC Sparkasse Bruck	Wiener Neustadt

7 January 1997	Drammen HK (Norway)	32 – 27	(South Korea) Doosan K. W. Seoul	Wiener Neustadt

=== Bronze-medal match ===
8 January 1997	HC Sparkasse Bruck (Austria)	27 – 33	(South Korea) Doosan K. W. Seoul	Wiener Neustadt

=== Final match ===
8 January 1997	Caja Cantabria (Spain)	30 – 29	(Norway) Drammen HK	Wiener Neustadt

== Final ranking ==
1	(Spain) Caja Cantabria de Santander
2	(Norway) Drammen HK
3	(South Korea) Doosan Kyung Wol Seoul
4	(Austria) HC Sparkasse Bruck
5	(Japan) Osaki Denki Tokyo
6	(Brazil) Metodista São Paulo
7	(Algeria) MC Algier
8	(Morocco) KAC Marrakech
