= Goran Stojanović =

Montenegrin-Qatari handball player (born 1977)

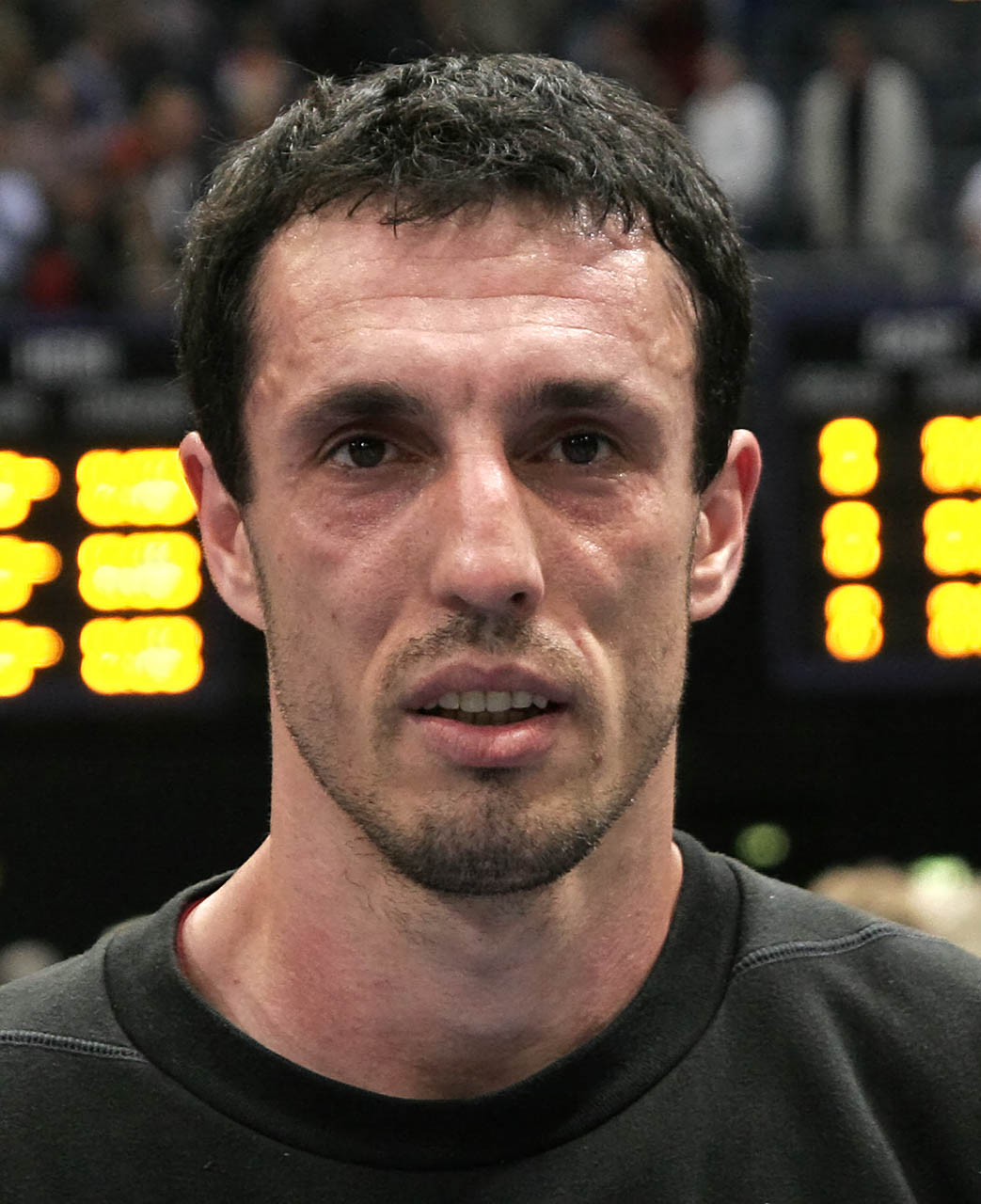
- Stojanović in 2007

Personal information
- Full name: Goran Stojanović
- Nationality: Montenegrin / Qatari
- Born: 24 February 1977 (age 49) Bar, SR Montenegro, SFR Yugoslavia
- Height: 1.92 m (6 ft 4 in)

Sport
- Sport: Handball
- Position: Goalkeeper
- Current club: Retired
- Number: 12,16

Youth career
- Years: Team
- –: Mornar Bar
National team
- Years: Team
- –: Serbia and Montenegro
- 2007–2010: Montenegro
- 2013–2018: Qatar
Medal record
Men's handball
Representing Qatar
World Championship
Silver medal – second place	2015 Qatar	Team
Asian Championship
Gold medal – first place	2014 Bahrain	Team
Gold medal – first place	2016 Bahrain	Team
Asian Games
Gold medal – first place	2014 Incheon	Team
Gold medal – first place	2018 Jakarta–Palembang	Team

Goran Stojanović (born 24 February 1977) is a Montenegrin-Qatari handball player for the Al Rayyan and the Qatar.

== Club career ==
After starting out at his hometown club Mornar Bar, Stojanović played for Crvena zvezda (2000–2002), Lovćen (2002–2004), Grasshoppers (2004–2005), VfL Pfullingen (2005–2006), VfL Gummersbach (2006–2011), Rhein-Neckar Löwen (2011–2014) and El Jaish (2014–2017) and Al Rayyan (2022–present).

== International career ==
At international level, Stojanović represented Montenegro at the 2008 European Championship in the nation's debut appearance in major tournaments. He later switched his allegiance to Qatar, winning the gold medal at the 2014 Asian Championship. Stojanović was a member of the team that finished as runners-up at the 2015 World Championship, the first World Championship medal for both Qatar and for any Asian team. The result was however controversial due to the many naturalized players of Qatar, of which Stojanović was one of them. According to the Frankfurter Allgemeine, only four of the 17 players in the squad were native to Qatar. The practice was criticised by Austrian goalkeeper after his team's loss to Qatar in the round of 16, saying "It [felt] like playing against a world selection team" and "I think it is not the sense of a world championship." Furthermore there were claims of favourable refereering for the hosts. After the final whistle of their semifinal against Poland, the Polish players showed their discontent by ironically applauding the three referees.

He subsequently helped Qatar win the 2016 Asian Championship and later participated at the 2016 Summer Olympics. Stojanović also won two gold medals at the Asian Games (2014 and 2018).

== Honours ==
Lovćen

- Serbia and Montenegro Handball Cup: 2002–03

VfL Gummersbach

- EHF Cup: 2008–09
- EHF Cup Winners' Cup: 2009–10, 2010–11

Rhein-Neckar Löwen

- EHF Cup: 2012–13

El Jaish

- Asian Club League Handball Championship: 2014
