= Toni Gerona =

Spanish handball coach

Personal information
- Full name: Antoni Gerona Salaet
- Nationality: Spanish
- Born: 31 July 1973 (age 53) Tortosa, Spain

Sport
- Sport: Handball

Teams managed
- Years: Team
- 1997–1998: Catalonia
- 1999–2004: FC Barcelona (youth)
- 2004–2008: FC Barcelona (assistant)
- 2008–2014: FC Barcelona B
- 2015–2017: El Jaish SC
- 2019–2023: C' Chartres MHB
- 2012–2013: Ireland
- 2017–2020: Tunisia
- 2020–2024: Serbia
- 2024-: Japan
Medal record
Head coach Serbia
Mediterranean Games
| Bronze medal – third place | 2022 Oran | Team |
Head coach Tunisia
Handball
African Championship
| Gold medal – first place | 2018 Gabon |
| Silver medal – second place | 2020 Tunisia |
Mediterranean Games
| Silver medal – second place | 2018 Tarragona | Team |

Antoni "Toni" Gerona Salaet (born 31 July 1973) is a Spanish handball coach.

== Biography ==
Toni Gerona trained at the National Institute of Physical Education of Catalonia between 1992 and 1997 with a license in handball.

After obtaining his diploma, he became technical training manager for the Catalan Handball Federation until 2004. At the same time, at FC Barcelona, Gerona took care of the Blaugrana youth teams from 1999 to 2004 and then, for three years, was Xesco Espar's assistant to the first team (2004-2008). In this role, he won the Champions League 2005 as well as the La Liga 2006. At the same time as the position of technical director of training (2008-2015), Gerona took over the management of the Barcelona reserve team (2009-2015). Gerona then coached the Qatari club of El Jaish from 2015 to 2017 and Al Rayyan from 2022.

In July 2017, Toni Gerona joined the Tunisian national team for three years, winning 2018 African Nations Championship and coming in second in 2020. He reached the second round of the 2019 World Championship. In the summer of 2019, at 45 and having become French-speaking following his experience in Tunisia, Toni Gerona joined the C 'Chartres MHB, promoted to the French first division. He also retained his function at the head of the Tunisian national team. In Chartres, he signed up for two seasons, one of which was optional, and benefited from an extended technical staff, made up in particular of a physical trainer and the young retiree of the grounds, Ricardo Candeias, for the goalkeepers.

He was dismissed from Tunisia national team after failing to retain the African title. A few weeks later, then eleventh in the championship, he extended his contract by a year with C'Chartres MHB. In May 2020 he became head coach for Serbia national team which he led until January 2024.

== Honours ==
=== Club ===
- EHF Champions League:
  - Winner: 2005 (assistant)
- Liga ASOBAL:
  - Winner: 2006 (assistant)

=== National team ===
- African Championship:
  - Winner: 2018
  - Runner-up: 2020
- Mediterranean Games:
  - Runner-up: 2018
  - Third place: 2022
