= Žarko Marković (handballer) =

Montenegrin-Qatari handball player (born 1986)

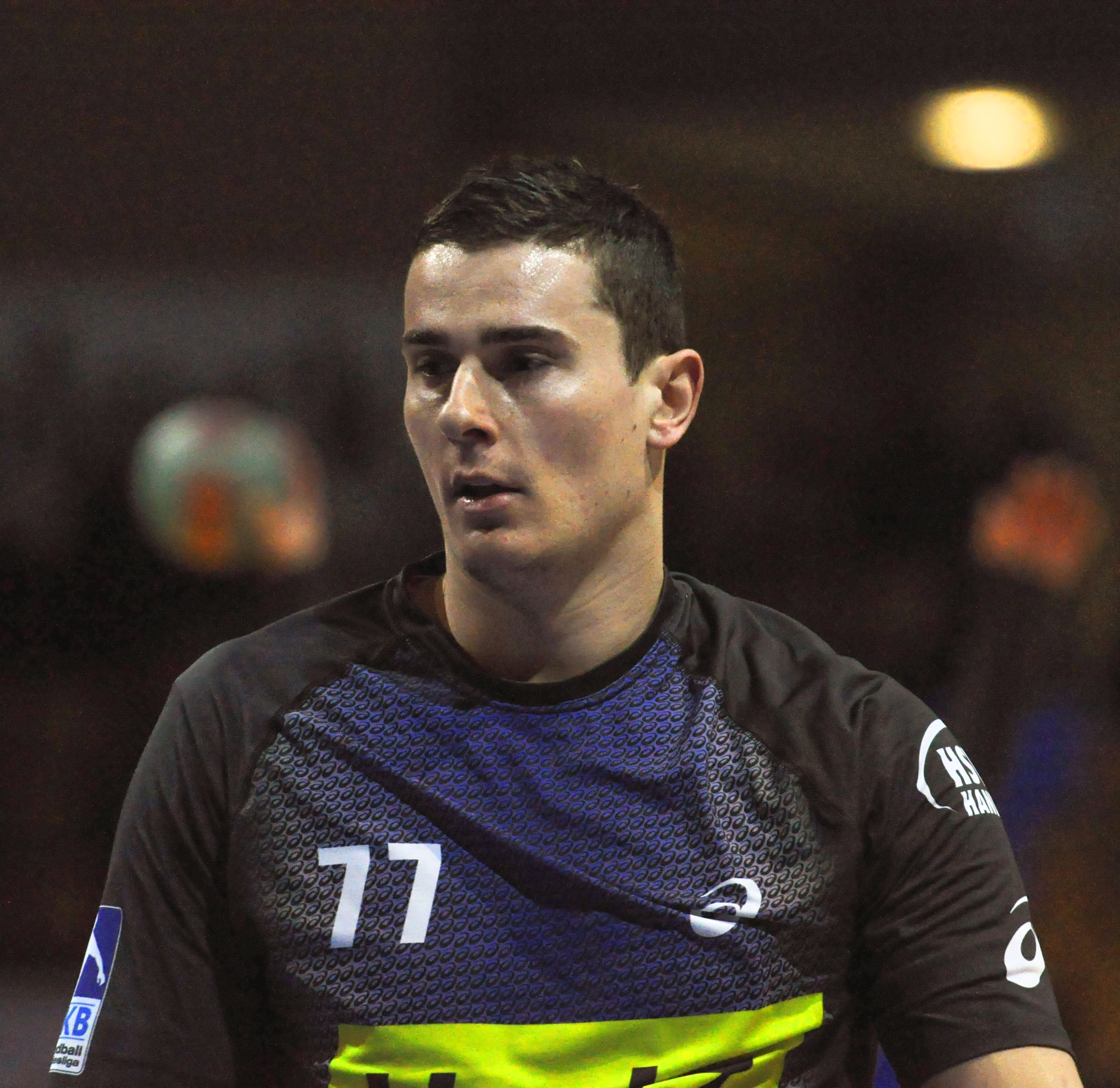
- Marković in 2015

Personal information
- Full name: Žarko Marković
- Nationality: Montenegrin / Qatari
- Born: 1 June 1986 (age 40) Cetinje, SR Montenegro, Yugoslavia
- Height: 2.03 m (6 ft 8 in)

Sport
- Sport: Handball
- Position: Right back
- Current club: Al Gharafa (on loan from Al Rayyan)
- Number: 1

Youth career
- Years: Team
- –: RK Cepelin

Senior clubs
- Years: Team
- 2003–2006: RK Jugović
- 2006–2007: Tatabánya KC
- 2007–2009: MKB Veszprém
- 2009–2010: Budućnost Podgorica
- 2010–2011: Al Ahli Jeddah
- 2011–2012: RK Metalurg Skopje
- 2012–2013: Frisch Auf Göppingen
- 2013–2014: HSV Hamburg
- 2014–2017: El Jaish
- 2017: RK Zagreb
- 2018: Al Duhail
- 2018–2019: Al Wakrah
- 2019: Al Gharafa
- 2020: Al Shamal
- 2020–2021: Al Rayyan
National team
Years	Team	Apps	(Gls)
2006–2012	Montenegro	30	(87)
2015–	Qatar	46	(213)
Medal record
Men's handball
Representing Serbia and Montenegro
U19 World Championship
Gold medal – first place	2005 Qatar
U18 European Championship
Gold medal – first place	2004 Serbia and Montenegro
Representing Qatar
World Championship
Silver medal – second place	2015 Qatar
Asian Championship
Gold medal – first place	2016 Bahrain
Gold medal – first place	2024 Bahrain

Žarko Marković (Serbian Cyrillic: Жарко Марковић; born 1 June 1986) is a Montenegrin-born Qatari handball player who plays for Al Gharafa on loan from Al Rayyan.

== Club career ==
After starting his career at Serbian club Jugović, Marković spent three seasons in Hungary with Tatabánya and MKB Veszprém. He later also played for Budućnost Podgorica, Al Ahli Jeddah, Metalurg Skopje, Frisch Auf Göppingen, HSV Hamburg, El Jaish, Zagreb, Al Duhail, Al Wakrah, Al Gharafa and Al Shamal.

== International career ==
=== Youth ===
At youth level, Marković won two gold medals for Serbia and Montenegro. He was a member of the winning squad at the 2004 European Under-18 Championship. Subsequently, Marković helped the nation win the 2005 World Under-19 Championship.

=== Senior ===
A Montenegro international since its inception, Marković participated at the 2008 European Championship in the nation's debut appearance in major tournaments. He was later omitted from the national team for the 2013 World Championship, before switching allegiance to Qatar. After being cleared to play, Marković made his debut for the Qatar national team at the 2015 World Championship, helping them finish as runners-up. The result was however controversial due to the many naturalized players of Qatar, of which Marković was one of them. According to the Frankfurter Allgemeine, only four of the 17 players in the squad were native to Qatar. The practice was criticised by Austrian goalkeeper after his team's loss to Qatar in the round of 16, saying "It [felt] like playing against a world selection team" and "I think it is not the sense of a world championship." Furthermore there were claims of favourable refereering for the hosts. After the final whistle of their semifinal against Poland, the Polish players showed their discontent by ironically applauding the three referees.

He also won the gold medal at the 2016 Asian Championship and took part in the 2016 Summer Olympics.

== Honours ==
Metalurg Skopje

- Macedonian Handball Super League: 2011–12

Al Duhail

- Qatar Handball League: 2017–18

Al Gharafa

- Arab Handball Championship of Champions: 2019

Al Shamal

- Arab Handball Championship of Winners' Cup: 2020
