= Abdullah Al-Hulaili =

Saudi Arabian handball player

Personal information
- Nationality: Saudi Arabian
- Born: 16 June 1994 (age 32)
- Height: 1.74 m (5 ft 9 in)

Sport
- Sport: Handball
- Position: Left wing
- Current club: Mudhar
- Number: 21
National team
Years	Team	Apps	(Gls)
2015–	Saudi Arabia	34	(76)
Medal record
Asian Championship
Bronze medal – third place	2022 Saudi Arabia
- Updated on 12 January 2023

Abdullah Al-Hulaili (Arabic: عبد الله الهليلي; born 16 June 1994) is a Saudi Arabian handball player for Mudhar and the Saudi Arabian national team.
