= Al Rayyan SC (handball) =

Qatari handball team

- Full name: Al Rayyan Handball Team
- Nickname(s): The Lions; Al-Raheeb (The Fierce) and & The Army
- Founded: 1978; 48 years ago
- Arena: Al Rayyan Indoor Arena; Al Rayyan
- Capacity: 2,000
- President: Sheikh Abdulla Bin Hamad Al-Thani
- Head coach: Toni Gerona
- League: Qatar Handball League
- 2027–28: 1st (champions)
- Club colours

Al Rayyan Handball Team (Arabic: الريان لكرة اليد فريق) is the handball team of Al Rayyan Sports Club, a multisport club based in Omm Alafai in the city of Al Rayyan, Qatar. It currently competes in the Qatar Handball League (QHL). The team was officially founded in 1978, eleven years after the sports club was founded.

The team has previously won the continental championship, the Asian Club League Handball Championship, on one occasion in 2012 and came runners-up in the next edition to Qatari club El Jaish.

== History ==
=== Beginnings ===
Handball has been played in Al Rayyan Sports Club since 1962, before Al Rayyan was officially founded. In 1978, the team was officially formed, and was then overseen by Tunisian Rachid Hammami on a temporary basis for about a month, before Hassan Abou El Fadl arrived as new head coach. He coached the team for 13 years and lived in the club. Originally, starting a handball team was very difficult in Qatar, as there were no facilities specially designed for it and it was hard to persuade children to join the youth teams as it was a period where football was blooming in popularity. As a result of the lack of experienced handball players in the region, the concept of officially establishing a handball team was originally discouraged by the administrators of the club.

Over the years, Al Rayyan built a strong team, thanks to then administrator of the club, Ali bin Saeed, who also received assistance from Hassan Abou El Fadl and the team captain, Mousa Reza. Ali bin Saeed, a Kuwaiti, met a childhood friend, Matar Aman, in 1978. Matar, who was in the United Arab Emirates for 15 years, now played handball professionally and was recruited to the club along with his brothers Abdulla and Fahad.

=== 1978–2000 ===
Al Rayyan played their first league game, losing to Al Sadd 15-48 in 1978. Later that year, Al Rayyan won their first domestic title, with Abdulla scoring the winning goal against Al Sadd with 4 seconds left till it went to penalties. They went on to win the league title and their youth team won a domestic cup.

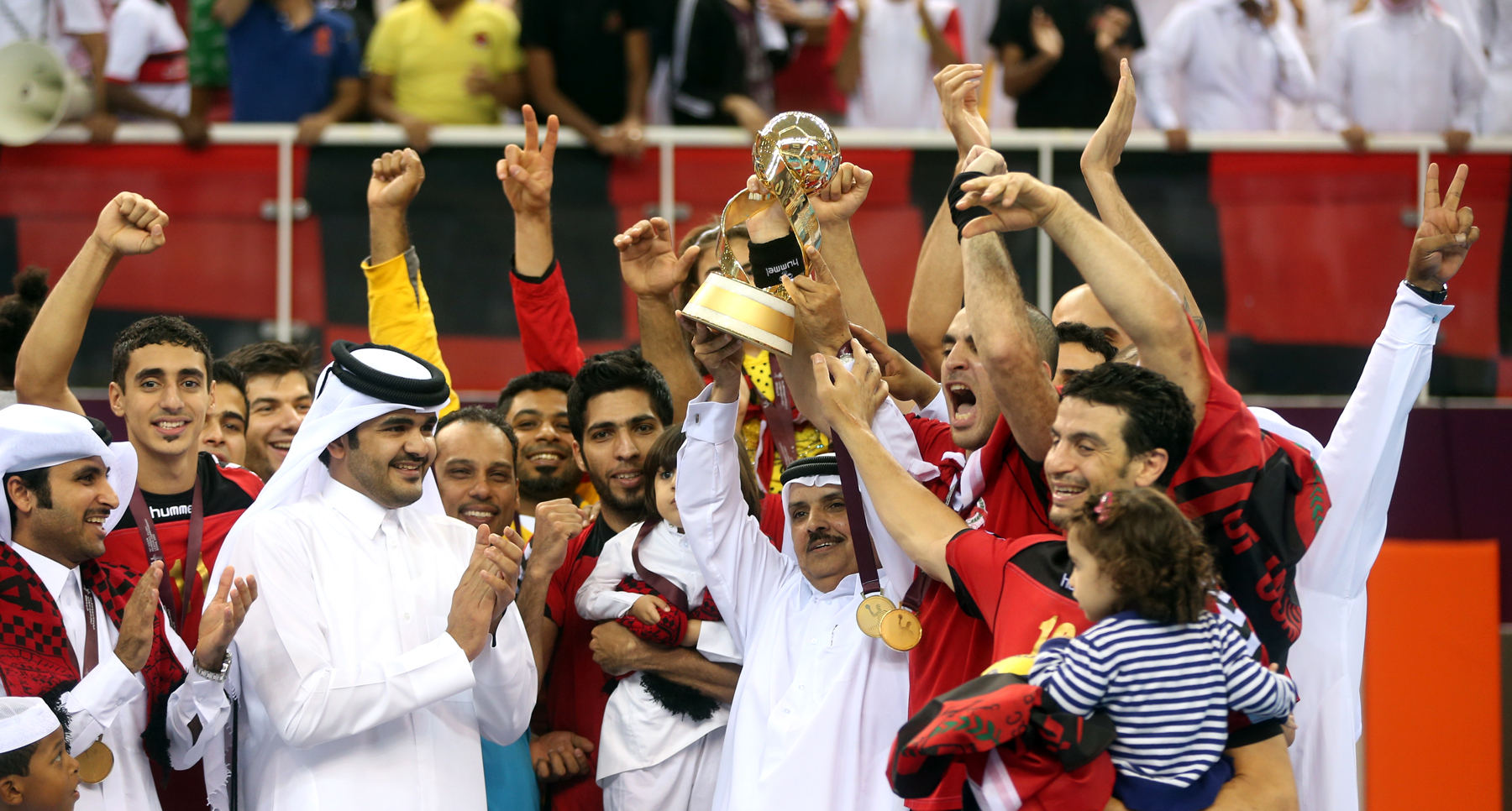
Sheikh Joaan bin Hamad Al Thani crowns Al Rayyan players as the new Asian Club Handball champions at the Al Gharafa Indoor Hall in 2012.

In the 1982-83 season, Al Rayyan achieved the impossible by winning all domestic championships in all age groups, which was 9 titles in one season. By then, the first team composed of legends like Youssef Al-Tamimi, Nasser Al-Hamid, and Mohammed al-Maliki. No other team in Qatar has accomplished a domestic triple with all age groups.

Al Rayyans squad was vastly improved in the mid-1980s. It included the likes of Fahad Aman (one of the Aman brothers), who was considered the best Qatari to ever play in the team, who could play in any position except goalkeeper and had received offers to play in German clubs. In addition, they had the Tunisian Nasser Abbasi, who was the top scorer in Africa and in Al Rayyan.

=== 2000–present ===
In 2000, Al Rayyan had won its first international title by defeating Zamalek SC in the Arab Club Handball Championship, a competition where they had finished third-placed the prior year. They were also runners-up in the Asian Club League Handball Championship in 2006.

They were eligible to participate in the 2011 IHF Super Globe as the host team. However, they finished the tournament second-last on home soil. They won the 2012 Asian Handball Championship, as well as coming in runners up the very next year to rival Qatari team El Jaish.

== Honours ==
- Qatar Handball League

Winners (14): 1981–82, 1983–84, 1984–85, 1986–87, 1990–91, 1992–93, 1997–98, 1998–99, 1999–2000, 2002–03, 2004–05, 2007–08, 2009–10, 2011–12

- Arab Club Handball Championship

Winners (1): 2000

- Asian Club League Handball Championship

Winners (1): 2012

- Youth trophies (3):

U-18: 3

== Managerial history ==
- (Tunisia) Rachid Hammami (1978)
- (Syria) Hassan Abou El Fadl (1978–91)
- (Montenegro) Pero Milošević (2003–04)
- (Tunisia) Jabbes Brahim (2011–12)
- (Croatia) Ilija Puljević (2013)
- (Croatia) Nenad Kljaić (2013–2014)
- (Spain) Toni Gerona (2020–present)

== Current squad ==
Squad for the 2027–28 season

Goalkeepers

- 12 (Serbia) Darko Stanić
- 16 (Qatar) Mohamed Daloul
- 44 (Montenegro) (Qatar) Goran Stojanović

Left Wingers

- 25 (Tunisia) (Qatar) Amine Khédira
- 92 (Qatar) Hamdi Ayed

Right Wingers

- 10 (Tunisia) (Qatar) Nasreddine Megdich
- 13 (Bosnia and Herzegovina) (Qatar) Eldar Memišević

Line players

- 2 (Montenegro) (Qatar) Jovo Damjanović
- 4 (Egypt) (Qatar) Hassan Mabrouk
- 5 (Qatar) Mahmoud Osman
- 6 (Tunisia) Issam Tej

Left Backs

- 7 (Egypt) Mostafa Khalil
- 8 (Tunisia) Rami Feikh

Centre Backs

- 11 (Syria) (Qatar) Kamalaldin Mallash
- 96 (Tunisia) Wael Mzoughi

Right Backs

- 1 (Montenegro) (Qatar) Žarko Marković
- 17 (Montenegro) (Qatar) Jovan Gačević
- 19 (Algeria) (Qatar) Charafeddine Boumendjel
- 34 (Egypt) Mahmoud Karam
- 72 (Syria) (Qatar) Hadi Hamdoon
