= Mario Tomić (handballer) =

Croatian-Qatari handball player (born 1988)

Personal information
- Nationality: Croatian / Qatari
- Born: 20 June 1988 (age 38) Zagreb, SR Croatia, SFR Yugoslavia
- Height: 1.91 m (6 ft 3 in)

Sport
- Sport: Handball
- Position: Pivot
- Current club: RK Nexe Našice
- Number: 33

Senior clubs
- Years: Team
- 2006–2011: Medveščak
- 2011–2012: Siscia
- 2012–2017: Al Sadd
- 2017–: Nexe Našice
National team
- Years: Team
- 2012–: Qatar
Medal record
Asian Championship
Gold medal – first place	2020 Kuwait
Gold medal – first place	2024 Bahrain

Mario Tomić (born 20 June 1988) is a Croatian Qatari handball player for RK Nexe Našice at the position of pivot.

He started his career as a goalkeeper in Medveščak. In 2011 he came to Siscia, where he moved to the position of pivot. Although he played in qualifications for the EHF Cup, due to a financial crisis in the club he went to Qatar. There, he played for 5 years in Al Sadd.

In 2017, he returned to Croatia and three months later, in September, signed a contract with RK Nexe Našice. He is still playing for the Qatar national team.
