= 2014–15 Croatian Premier League (men's handball) =

Premijer liga
- Season: 2014–15
- Biggest home win: Spačva 43–23 Split
- Biggest away win: Ivanić 22–32 Varaždin 1930; Đakovo 28–38 Varaždin 1930
- Highest scoring: Poreč 41–31 Bjelovar

The 2014–15 Croatian Premier Handball League is the 24th season of the Premier League, Croatia's premier Handball league.

== Team information ==
Locations of the 2014-15 Croatian Premijer Liga

The following 16 clubs compete in the Premijer liga during the 2014–15 season:

Team	Location	Arena	Capacity
Bjelovar	Bjelovar	ŠSD Bjelovar	1,500
Buzet	Buzet	Dvorana Buzet	
Đakovo	Đakovo	Nova školska dvorana	2,000
Dubrava	Zagreb	ŠD Dubrava	1,800
Gorica	Velika Gorica	Dvorana srednjih škola	
Karlovac	Karlovac	SŠD Mladost	2,750
Marina Kaštela	Kaštel Gomilica	Gradska dvorana Kaštela	
Ivanić	Ivanić-Grad		
Nexe	Našice	Sportska dvorana kralja Tomislava	2,500
Poreč	Poreč	Sportski Rekreativni Centar Veli Jože	1,400
Spačva	Vinkovci	Sportska dvorana Bartol Kašić	
Split	Split	Spaladium Arena	10,931
Umag	Umag		
Varaždin 1930	Varaždin	Varaždin Arena	5,200
Zagreb	Zagreb	Arena Zagreb	15,200
Zamet	Rijeka	Centar Zamet	2,350

Team from SEHA League

== Regular season ==
=== Standings ===
	Team	Pld	W	D	L	GF	GA	Diff	Pts	Head-to-head
1	Varaždin 1930	26	21	1	4	800	648	+152	43	
2	Poreč	26	19	1	6	783	704	+79	39	POR 31–30 DUB; DUB 30–31 POR
3	Dubrava	26	19	1	6	816	724	+92	39	POR 31–30 DUB; DUB 30–31 POR
4	Umag	26	16	2	8	748	693	+55	34	
5	Zamet	26	13	2	11	745	681	+64	28	
6	Gorica	26	13	0	13	702	705	−3	26	GOR 30–25 SPA; SPA 30–27 GOR
7	Spačva-Vinkovci	26	13	0	13	692	698	−6	26	GOR 30–25 SPA; SPA 30–27 GOR
8	Karlovac	26	12	1	13	622	652	−30	25	
9	Marina Kaštela	26	11	1	14	636	652	−16	22	
10	Đakovo	26	10	0	16	707	738	−31	20	
11	Ivanić	26	8	3	15	648	712	−64	19	
12	Buzet	26	8	2	16	643	665	−22	18	
13	Bjelovar	26	8	0	18	707	760	−53	16	
14	Split	26	3	2	21	539	756	−217	6	

Championship Round
5th – 8th Placement
Relegation Round

Pld - Played; W - Won; D - Drawn; L - Lost; GF - Goals for; GA - Goals against; Diff - Difference; Pts - Points.

=== Schedule and results ===
In the table below the home teams are listed on the left and the away teams along the top.

	RK Bjelovar	RK Buzet	RK Đakovo	RK Dubrava	HRK Gorica	MRK Ivanić	HRK Karlovac	RK Marina Kaštela	RK Poreč	RK Spačva-Vinkovci	RK Split	RK Umag	GRK Varaždin 1930	RK Zamet
Bjelovar		31–28	24–29	26–29	28–27	24–26	29–26	30–26	29–36	26–22	39–22	30–32	30–31	28–27
Buzet	26–24		29–25	26–32	26–22	35–21	25–26	28–25	20–26	25–18	29–22	25–26	24–24	17–21
Đakovo	28–25	26–20		25–30	28–32	32–26	25–26	25–20	26–30	28–24	37–24	26–23	28–38	24–25
Dubrava	38–34	31–22	40–32		35–25	29–24	30–25	27–24	30–31	30–25	29–28	30–26	32–29	33–27
Gorica	32–26	28–24	31–30	34–37		29–23	25–21	21–22	30–27	30–25	10–0	28–26	20–27	25–33
Ivanić	29–24	26–21	20–21	30–36	26–25		25–25	21–15	31–28	22–27	27–27	23–20	22–32	27–33
Karlovac	26–24	19–21	30–26	26–24	27–30	23–21		28–26	25–24	30–23	10–0	22–29	26–32	22–21
Marina Kaštela	31–24	28–26	25–24	31–28	29–23	20–20	24–15		26–29	29–22	29–19	26–32	26–29	25–24
Poreč	41–31	29–25	33–27	31–30	32–30	29–20	28–20	35–29		35–28	36–25	25–23	31–30	29–27
Spačva-Vinkovci	24–17	25–23	33–26	28–25	30–27	31–25	27–24	20–17	31–26		43–23	30–28	28–33	23–19
Split	24–32	26–21	33–30	26–36	30–31	21–34	26–29	0–10	23–32	29–28		24–29	0–10	33–33
Umag	34–25	27–25	34–21	29–29	30–29	36–30	28–24	29–25	30–30	36–29	34–17		30–26	28–22
Varaždin 1930	37–20	33–28	34–28	32–30	28–29	35–19	31–25	37–24	30–26	29–21	34–21	41–29		32–27
Zamet	29–27	24–24	29–30	28–36	35–29	34–30	28–20	36–24	28–24	36–27	44–16	31–20	24–26	

== Championship round ==
=== Standings ===
	Team	Pld	W	D	L	GF	GA	Diff	Pts	Qualification or relegation
1	Zagreb	0	0	0	0	0	0	+	0	Qualification to the Final
2	Nexe	0	0	0	0	0	0	+	0	Qualification to the Final
3	Varaždin 1930	0	0	0	0	0	0	−	0	Qualification to EHF Cup second round
4	Poreč	0	0	0	0	0	0	−	0	
5	Dubrava	0	0	0	0	0	0	−	0	
6	Umag	0	0	0	0	0	0	−	0	

Pld - Played; W - Won; D - Drawn; L - Lost; GF - Goals for; GA - Goals against; Diff - Difference; Pts - Points.

=== Schedule and results ===
In the table below the home teams are listed on the left and the away teams along the top.

	RK Dubrava	RK Nexe	RK Poreč	RK Umag	GRK Varaždin 1930	RK Zagreb
Dubrava		–	–	–	–	–
Nexe	–		–	–	–	–
Poreč	–	–		–	–	–
Umag	–	–	–		–	–
Varaždin 1930	–	–	–	–		–
Zagreb	–	–	–	–	–	

== Number of teams by counties ==
	County (županija)	No. teams	Teams
1	Istria	3	Buzet, Poreč and Umag
2	Osijek-Baranja	2	Đakovo and Nexe Našice
2	Split-Dalmatia	2	Marina Kaštela and Split
2	Zagreb County	2	Gorica and Ivanić
2	City of Zagreb	2	Dubrava and Zagreb
6	Bjelovar-Bilogora	1	Bjelovar
6	Karlovac	1	Karlovac
6	Primorje-Gorski Kotar	1	Zamet
6	Varaždin	1	Varaždin
6	Vukovar-Srijem	1	Spačva-Vinkovci
