= Selim Hedoui =

Tunisian handball player (born 1983)

Personal information
- Nationality: Tunisian
- Born: 1 October 1983 (age 43) Chebba, Tunisia
- Height: 1.99 m (6 ft 6 in)

Sport
- Sport: Handball
- Position: Left back
- Current club: Al Arabi
National team
Years	Team	Apps	(Gls)
–	Tunisia	218	(398)
Medal record
Mediterranean Games
Bronze medal – third place	2009 Pescara	Team

Selim Hedoui (born 1 October 1983) is a Tunisian handball player, playing for Al Arabi. He competed for the Tunisian national team at the 2012 Summer Olympics in London, where the Tunisian team reached the quarterfinals.
