= Mario Tomić (musician) =

- Born: 1987 (age 38–39); Split, SR Croatia
- Occupations: Music arranger, composer, jazz musician, guitarist, music producer
- Instrument: Guitar

Mario Tomić (born 1987, Split) is a Croatian music arranger, composer, jazz musician, guitarist and music producer. He lives and works in the United States.

== Career ==
Label Guitar Records named him world's best guitarist of 2005. In 2012 he received Silver award for jazz-fusion composition of the year given by Uplay for his composition "Tribual fusion". He composed music themes for famous Croatian TV talk shows "Globalno sijelo", "Dobro jutro, Hrvatska" ("Good Morning Croatia") and documentary films "Tolerancijom do mira" i "Meditacija sunca".

He published 4 CDs. He played with Tommy Emmanuel in Split at the Prokurativa square.
