= Qatar Handball League =

- Sport: Handball
- Founded: 1981
- No. of teams: 10
- Country: Qatar
- Most recent champion: Al Arabi SC (3rd title)
- Most titles: Al Rayyan SC (15 titles)
- Broadcaster: Al Kass
- Website: qatarhandball.com

The Qatar Handball League is a professional handball league in Qatar. It was founded in 1981.

== Champions ==
Champions so far are:

Season	Champion	Runner-up	Third place
1981–82	Al Rayyan SC	Al Arabi SC	Qatar SC
1982–83	Al Arabi SC	Qatar SC	Al Rayyan SC
1983–84	Al Rayyan SC	Al Sadd SC	Al Arabi SC
1984–85	Al Rayyan SC	Al Arabi SC	Qatar SC
1985–86	Al Sadd SC	Al Rayyan SC	Al Arabi SC
1986–87	Al Rayyan SC	Al-Nasar SC	Al Sadd SC
1987–88	Al Sadd SC	Al Arabi SC	Al Rayyan SC
1988–89	Al Sadd SC	Al Arabi SC	Al Rayyan SC
1989–90	Qatar SC	Al Rayyan SC	Al Sadd SC
1990–91	Al Rayyan SC	Al Sadd SC	Qatar SC
1991–92	Qatar SC	Al Sadd SC	Al Rayyan SC
1992–93	Al Rayyan SC	Al Arabi SC	Qatar SC
1993–94	Al Sadd SC	Al Rayyan SC	Al Ahli SC
1994–95	Al Ahli SC	Al Rayyan SC	Qatar SC
1995–96	Al Ahli SC	Al Sadd SC	Al Rayyan SC
1996–97	Al Sadd SC	Al Rayyan SC	Al Ahli SC
1997–98	Al Rayyan SC	Al Ahli SC	Al Sadd SC
1998–99	Al Rayyan SC	Al Ahli SC	Qatar SC
1999–2000	Al Rayyan SC	Al Ahli SC	Al Arabi SC
2000–01	Al Sadd SC	Al Ahli SC	Qatar SC
2001–02	Al Sadd SC	Al Rayyan SC	Al Ahli SC
2002–03	Al Rayyan SC	Al Sadd SC	Al-Wakrah SC
2003–04	Al Sadd SC	Al Ahli SC	Al Rayyan SC
2004–05	Al Rayyan SC	Al Ahli SC	Al-Wakrah SC
2005–06	Al Ahli SC	Al Rayyan SC	Al Sadd SC
2006–07	Al Ahli SC	Al Sadd SC	Al-Wakrah SC
2007–08	Al Rayyan SC	Al Ahli SC	Al Sadd SC
2008–09	Al Sadd SC	Al Ahli SC	El Jaish SC
2009–10	Al Rayyan SC	El Jaish SC	Al Sadd SC
2010–11	El Jaish SC	Al Rayyan SC	Al Ahli SC
2011–12	Al Rayyan SC	El Jaish SC	Al-Gharafa SC
2012–13	Lekhwiya SC	Al-Qiuada SC	El Jaish SC
2013–14	El Jaish SC	Al-Gharafa SC	Lekhwiya SC
2014–15	Al-Gharafa SC	Al Sadd SC	Al Rayyan SC
2015–16	El Jaish SC	Lekhwiya SC	Al Rayyan SC
2016–17	El Jaish SC	Al-Qiuada SC	Al Rayyan SC
2017–18	Al Duhail SC	Al-Wakrah SC	Al Rayyan SC
2018–19	Al-Wakrah SC	Al Duhail SC	Al Sadd SC
2019–20	Al Arabi SC	Al-Wakrah SC	Al Duhail SC
2020–21	Al Duhail SC	Al Arabi SC	Al-Wakrah SC
2021–22	Al Duhail SC	Al-Wakrah SC	Al Rayyan SC
2022–23	Al Duhail SC	Al-Gharafa SC	Al Rayyan SC
2023–24	Al Rayyan SC	Al Arabi SC	Al Duhail SC
2024–25	Al Arabi SC	Al Duhail SC	Al Rayyan SC

== Performances ==
=== Performance by club ===
Club	Winners	Runners-up	Third place	Winning years
Al Rayyan SC	15	8	12	1981–82, 1983–84, 1984–85, 1986–87, 1990–91, 1992–93, 1997–98, 1998–99, 1999–2000, 2002–03, 2004–05, 2007–08, 2009–10, 2011–12, 2023–24
Al Sadd SC	9	7	7	1985–86, 1987–88, 1988–89, 1993–94, 1996–97, 2000–01, 2001–02, 2003–04, 2008–09
Al Ahli SC	4	8	4	1994–95, 1995–96, 2005–06, 2006–07
Al Duhail SC	4	3	3	2012–13 (as Lekhwiya), 2017–18, 2020–21, 2021–22
El Jaish SC	4	2	2	2010–11, 2013–14, 2015–16, 2016–17
Al Arabi SC	3	7	3	1982–83, 2019–20, 2024–25
Qatar SC	2	1	7	1989–90, 1991–92
Al-Wakrah SC	1	3	4	2018–19
Al-Gharafa SC	1	1	1	2014–15
Al-Qiuada SC	–	2	–	–
Al-Nasar SC	–	1	–	–

== See also ==
- List of handball clubs in Qatar
