= El Jaish SC (handball) =

El Jaish
- Full name: El Jaish Handball Team
- Nickname: The Army
- Founded: 2011
- Arena: Al Rayyan Indoor Arena; Al Rayyan, Qatar
- Capacity: 2,000
- President: (Qatar) Hamad bin Ali Al Attiyah
- Head coach: (Montenegro) Zoran Kastratović
- League: Qatar Handball League
- 2016–17: 1st (champions)
- Club colours
Home	Away

El Jaish Handball Team (Arabic: فريق الجيش كرة اليد) was the handball team of El Jaish SC, a multisport club based in the Al-Duhail area of Doha, Qatar. It used to compete in the Qatar Handball League (QHL). The team which was officially founded in 2011, became a dominant force in the QHL since its formation.

The team has previously won the continental championship, the Asian Club League Handball Championship, on one occasion in 2013. In April 2017, the club was taken over by Lekhwiya and rebranded into Al-Duhail SC.

== Honours ==
- Qatar Handball League

Winners (4): 2010–11, 2013–14, 2015–16, 2016–17

- Asian Club League Handball Championship

Winners (1): 2013

- IHF Super Globe

Third place (1): 2013

== Notable former players ==
- (Sweden) Dan Beutler
- (Hungary) Nándor Fazekas
- (Montenegro) (Qatar) Jovo Damjanović
- (Montenegro) (Qatar) Žarko Marković
- (Montenegro) (Qatar) Goran Stojanović
- (Montenegro) Zoran Roganović
- (Egypt) Ahmed El-Ahmar
- (Bosnia and Herzegovina) (Qatar) Mirza Kapić
- (Bosnia and Herzegovina) Duško Čelica
- (Bosnia and Herzegovina) Deni Velić
- (Croatia) Janko Kević
- (Serbia) (Qatar) Milan Šajin

== Managerial history ==
- (Croatia) Ivica Obrvan (2013)
- (Algeria) Kamel Akkab (2013–)
- (Spain) Toni Gerona (2015–2017)

== See also ==
- El Jaish SC (basketball)
- El Jaish SC (football)
- El Jaish SC (volleyball)
- IHF Super Globe
