= Al Sadd SC (handball) =

- Full name: Al Sadd Handball Team
- Nickname(s): Al-Zaeem (The Boss); Al-Dheeb (The Wolf)
- Founded: 1969; 56 years ago
- Arena: Ali Bin Hamad Al Attiya Arena; Doha, Qatar
- Capacity: 7,700
- President: Mohammed Al Thani
- League: Qatar Handball League

Al Sadd's active sections
Football	Basketball	Handball
Volleyball	Futsal	Athletics

Al Sadd Handball Team (Arabic: فريق السد لكرة اليد) is the handball team of Al Sadd SC, based in the capital city of Doha, Qatar. It currently competes in the Qatar Handball League (QHL). The team is one of the most successful in all of Asia, winning the Asian Club League Handball Championship a record 5 times.

== History ==
Al Sadd Handball Team was formed shortly after the formation of the club in 1969. Since then, they have dominated the handball scene in Qatar, winning a record number of domestic trophies. Their success hasn't been limited to local competitions, however. The team has won a record of 5 Asian Club League Handball Championship titles, meaning they have the most Asian titles to their name. In addition, they won the Handball Club World Cup in 2000. They have also won the IHF Super Globe in 2002 as the host team, as well as finishing runners-up in 2010, again as the host team.

== Honours ==
=== Domestic ===
- Qatar Handball League

Winners (9) : 1986, 1988, 1989, 1994, 1997, 2001, 2002, 2004, 2009

- Emir of Qatar Cup

Winners (8) : 1997, 1999, 2002, 2004, 2005, 2006, 2007, 2013

- Qatar Crown Prince Cup

Winners (7) : 2002, 2003, 2004, 2005, 2006, 2009, 2010

=== International ===
- GCC Club Handball Champions

Winners : 2004, 2014, 2015

- Asian Handball Champions League

Winners : 2000, 2001, 2002, 2003, 2005

- IHF Super Globe (Handball Club World Cup)

Winners : 2002

== Team ==
=== Managerial history ===
- (Algeria) Sufyan Druasi (2010–2011)
- (Egypt) Ahmed Deabes (2011–2012)
- (France) Patrice Canayer (2012) (temp)
- (Algeria) Lakhdar Arrouche (2012–2013)
- (Croatia) Franjo Meter (2013–2014)

=== Notable players ===
Qatar

- (Qatar) Abdulla Al Ghamdi
- (Qatar) Nasser Al Turki
- (Qatar) Nasser Al Sadd
- (Qatar) Ghanim Al Ali
- (Qatar) Sid Kenaoui

Algeria

- (Algeria) Abdelkrim Bendjemil

Bosnia and Herzegovina

- (Bosnia and Herzegovina) Mirsad Terzić
- (Bosnia and Herzegovina) Benjamin Čičkušić
- (Bosnia and Herzegovina) Nikola Prce

Croatia

- (Croatia) Mirko Alilović
- (Croatia) Ivano Balić
- (Croatia) Petar Metličić
- (Croatia) Renato Sulić
- (Croatia) Mario Tomić

Denmark

- (Denmark) Lars Jørgensen

Germany

- (Germany) Andrej Klimovets

Hungary

- (Hungary) Péter Gulyás
- (Hungary) Gergő Iváncsik
- (Hungary) (Serbia) Nikola Eklemović
- (Hungary) Carlos Pérez

Macedonia

- (North Macedonia) Kiril Lazarov

Romania

- (Romania) Alin Șania

Serbia

- (Serbia) Marko Vujin
- (Serbia) Ratko Nikolić
- (Serbia) Dejan Perić
- (Serbia) Stefan Ilić
- (Serbia) Nenad Peruničić

Slovenia

- (Slovenia) Renato Vugrinec
- (Slovenia) Matevž Skok
- (Slovenia) Borut Mačkovšek

Spain

- (Spain) Eduardo Gurbindo
- (Spain) Eduard Fernández

=== Notable former coach ===
Montenegro

- (Montenegro) (Serbia) Veselin Vujović

== See also ==
- Al Sadd Basketball Team
- Al Sadd Futsal Team
- Al Sadd Volleyball Team
