= 2026 Asian Men's Handball Championship =

Handball tournament in Kuwait

Tournament details
- Host country: Kuwait
- Venues: 2
- Dates: 15–29 January
- Teams: 15 (from 2 confederations)

Final positions
- Champions: Bahrain (1st title)
- Runners-up: Qatar
- Third place: Kuwait
- Fourth place: Japan

Tournament statistics
- Matches played: 50
- Goals scored: 2,809 (56.18 per match)
- Attendance: 38,560 (771 per match)
- Top scorers: (Kuwait) Saif Al-Adwani (54 goals)

Awards
- Best player: (Kuwait) Hasan Safar

The 2026 Asian Men's Handball Championship was the 22nd edition of the Asian Men's Handball Championship, the biennial international men's handball championship of Asia and Oceania organized by AHF. The tournament was held from 15 to 29 January 2026 in Sabah Al-Salem, Kuwait.

It was the fourth time in history that the championship was organised by the Kuwait Handball Association.

It also acted as a qualification tournament for the 2027 World Men's Handball Championship in Germany, with top four teams from the championship directly qualifying for the event. If Australia would have finished inside the top five, they would have qualified as well, as the representative of Oceania.

Qatar were the six time defending champions, recently beating Japan 30–24 in the 2024 final in Isa Town. Bahrain won their first title with a win over Qatar in the final.

== Host selection ==
Kuwait was given the hosting rights on 24 February 2025. It will be the fourth time in history that the championship will be organised by the Kuwait Handball Association after 1977, 1995, and 2020.

== Teams ==
Team	Appearance(s)					Previous best performance (Note: Bold text indicates they hosted that edition.)
Team	Total	First	Last	Streak	2024	Previous best performance
Australia	4th	2018	2022	1	N/A	Eleventh place (2018)
Bahrain	19th	1977	2024	13	3rd	Runners-up (2010, 2014, 2016, 2018, 2022)
China	17th	1977	2024	2	10th	Runners-up (1979, 2000)
Hong Kong	6th	1983	2024	4	13th	Eighth place (1983)
India	6th	1979	2024	3	16th	Fifth place (1979)
Iran	17th	1989	2024	14	6th	Third place (2014)
Iraq	7th	1977	2024	4	8th	Fifth place (1977)
Japan	21st	1977	2024	2	2nd	Champions (1977, 1979)
Jordan	8th	1983	2022	1	N/A	Seventh place (1983, 2006)
Kuwait (H)	18th	1977	2024	4	4th	Champions (1995, 2002, 2004, 2006)
Oman	7th	2004	2024	3	12th	Eighth place (2014, 2016, 2018)
Qatar	18th	1983	2024	13	1st	Champions (2014, 2016, 2018, 2020, 2022, 2024)
Saudi Arabia	17th	1977	2024	10	9th	Third place (2002, 2008, 2012, 2022)
South Korea	19th	1977	2024	11	5th	Champions (1983, 1987, 1989, 1991, 1993, 2000, 2008, 2010, 2012)
United Arab Emirates	15th	1977	2024	11	7th	Fourth place (2014)

== Venue ==
The venue was the Sheikh Saad Al-Abdullah Al-Salim Al-Sabah Covered Halls Complex in Sabah Al-Salem.

2026 Asian Men's Handball Championship is located in Kuwait	Sabah Al-Salem
2026 Asian Men's Handball Championship is located in Kuwait	Sheikh Saad Al-Abdullah Al-Salim Al-Sabah Covered Halls Complex
2026 Asian Men's Handball Championship is located in Kuwait	Capacity: TBD

== Draw ==
The draw was held at 17:30 AST on 15 October 2025 at the Conference Room of the Safir Fintas Kuwait Hotel, Fintās, Kuwait. The draw started with, in order, pots 4, 3, 2 and 1 being drawn, with each team selected then allocated into the first available group alphabetically.

=== Seeding ===
The seeding was based on the results of the previous edition.

Pot 1	Pot 2	Pot 3	Pot 4
Qatar; Japan; Bahrain; Kuwait	South Korea; Iran; United Arab Emirates; Iraq	Saudi Arabia; China; Oman; Hong Kong	India; Australia; Jordan

=== Draw results ===
Group A
Pos	Team
A1	Qatar
A2	South Korea
A3	Oman

Group B
Pos	Team
B1	Bahrain
B2	Iraq
B3	China
B4	Jordan

Group C
Pos	Team
C1	Kuwait (H)
C2	United Arab Emirates
C3	Hong Kong
C4	India

Group D
Pos	Team
D1	Japan
D2	Iran
D3	Saudi Arabia
D4	Australia

=== Schedule ===
Schedule
Round	Matchday	Date
Preliminary round	Matchday 1	15–16 January 2026
Preliminary round	Matchday 2	17–18 January 2026
Preliminary round	Matchday 3	19–20 January 2026
Main round and Ranking groups	Matchday 4	22 January 2026
Main round and Ranking groups	Matchday 5	23 January 2026
Main round and Ranking groups	Matchday 6	25 January 2026
Ranking games	All games	27 January 2026
Knockout stage	Semi-finals	27 January 2026
Knockout stage	Final	29 January 2026

== Preliminary round ==
All times are local (UTC+3).

=== Tiebreakers ===
In the group stage, teams are ranked according to points (2 points for a win, 1 point for a draw, 0 points for a loss). After completion of the group stage, if two or more teams have the same number of points, the ranking will be determined as follows:

1. Highest number of points in matches between the teams directly involved;
2. Superior goal difference in matches between the teams directly involved;
3. Highest number of goals scored in matches between the teams directly involved;
4. Superior goal difference in all matches of the group;
5. Highest number of plus goals in all matches of the group;

If the ranking of one of these teams is determined, the above criteria are consecutively followed until the ranking of all teams is determined. If no ranking can be determined, a decision shall be obtained by AHF through drawing of lots.

=== Group A ===
Pos	Team	Pld	W	D	L	GF	GA	GD	Pts	Qualification
1	South Korea	2	2	0	0	61	55	+6	4	Group I
2	Qatar	2	1	0	1	58	47	+11	2	Group II
3	Oman	2	0	0	2	39	56	−17	0	Group III

Source: IHF
Rules for classification: 1) points; 2) head-to-head points; 3) head-to-head goal difference; 4) head-to-head number of goals scored; 5) goal difference.

16 January 2026; 14:00	Oman	15–27	Qatar	Sheikh Saad Al-Abdullah Al-Salim Al-Sabah Covered Halls, Sabah Al-Salem; Attendance: 200; Referees: Al-Mawt, Marhoon (BHR)
16 January 2026; 14:00	Al-Dughaishi 5	(6–12)	Madadi 7	Sheikh Saad Al-Abdullah Al-Salim Al-Sabah Covered Halls, Sabah Al-Salem; Attendance: 200; Referees: Al-Mawt, Marhoon (BHR)
16 January 2026; 14:00	5× (suspension) 2× (red card)	Report	2× (suspension)	Sheikh Saad Al-Abdullah Al-Salim Al-Sabah Covered Halls, Sabah Al-Salem; Attendance: 200; Referees: Al-Mawt, Marhoon (BHR)

18 January 2026; 16:00	South Korea	29–24	Oman	Sheikh Saad Al-Abdullah Al-Salim Al-Sabah Covered Halls, Sabah Al-Salem; Attendance: 200; Referees: Al-Naseem, Al-Enezi (KUW)
18 January 2026; 16:00	Kim R., Kim T. 6	(15–10)	Al-Dughaishi, T. Al-Hadidi 6	Sheikh Saad Al-Abdullah Al-Salim Al-Sabah Covered Halls, Sabah Al-Salem; Attendance: 200; Referees: Al-Naseem, Al-Enezi (KUW)
18 January 2026; 16:00	3× (suspension) 1× (red card)	Report	4× (suspension)	Sheikh Saad Al-Abdullah Al-Salim Al-Sabah Covered Halls, Sabah Al-Salem; Attendance: 200; Referees: Al-Naseem, Al-Enezi (KUW)

20 January 2026; 18:00	Qatar	31–32	South Korea	Sheikh Saad Al-Abdullah Al-Salim Al-Sabah Covered Halls, Sabah Al-Salem; Attendance: 200; Referees: Gheisarian, Gheisarian (IRI)
20 January 2026; 18:00	Madadi 5	(16–14)	Jang 7	Sheikh Saad Al-Abdullah Al-Salim Al-Sabah Covered Halls, Sabah Al-Salem; Attendance: 200; Referees: Gheisarian, Gheisarian (IRI)
20 January 2026; 18:00	1× (yellow card) 4× (suspension)	Report	5× (suspension)	Sheikh Saad Al-Abdullah Al-Salim Al-Sabah Covered Halls, Sabah Al-Salem; Attendance: 200; Referees: Gheisarian, Gheisarian (IRI)

=== Group B ===
Pos	Team	Pld	W	D	L	GF	GA	GD	Pts	Qualification
1	Bahrain	3	3	0	0	106	68	+38	6	Group II
2	Iraq	3	2	0	1	71	77	−6	4	Group I
3	China	3	1	0	2	80	95	−15	2	Group IV
4	Jordan	3	0	0	3	70	87	−17	0	Group III

Source: IHF
Rules for classification: 1) points; 2) head-to-head points; 3) head-to-head goal difference; 4) head-to-head number of goals scored; 5) goal difference.

16 January 2026; 16:00	Jordan	21–32	Bahrain	Sheikh Saad Al-Abdullah Al-Salim Al-Sabah Covered Halls, Sabah Al-Salem; Attendance: 200; Referees: Ismoilov, Ismoilov (UZB)
16 January 2026; 16:00	Abu Hasan 7	(10–17)	Al-Showaikh 6	Sheikh Saad Al-Abdullah Al-Salim Al-Sabah Covered Halls, Sabah Al-Salem; Attendance: 200; Referees: Ismoilov, Ismoilov (UZB)
16 January 2026; 16:00	3× (suspension)	Report	2× (suspension)	Sheikh Saad Al-Abdullah Al-Salim Al-Sabah Covered Halls, Sabah Al-Salem; Attendance: 200; Referees: Ismoilov, Ismoilov (UZB)

16 January 2026; 18:00	China	22–27	Iraq	Sheikh Saad Al-Abdullah Al-Salim Al-Sabah Covered Halls, Sabah Al-Salem; Attendance: 300; Referees: Al-Enezi, Al-Naseem (KUW)
16 January 2026; 18:00	Sun, Xie 5	(12–14)	Al-Moulidi 7	Sheikh Saad Al-Abdullah Al-Salim Al-Sabah Covered Halls, Sabah Al-Salem; Attendance: 300; Referees: Al-Enezi, Al-Naseem (KUW)
16 January 2026; 18:00	2× (suspension)	Report	1× (yellow card) 6× (suspension)	Sheikh Saad Al-Abdullah Al-Salim Al-Sabah Covered Halls, Sabah Al-Salem; Attendance: 300; Referees: Al-Enezi, Al-Naseem (KUW)

18 January 2026; 14:00	Jordan	21–26	Iraq	Sheikh Saad Al-Abdullah Al-Salim Al-Sabah Covered Halls, Sabah Al-Salem; Attendance: 150; Referees: Ismoilov, Ismoilov (UZB)
18 January 2026; 14:00	Abu Hasan, Al-Otaibi 5	(10–14)	B. Hammoodi 12	Sheikh Saad Al-Abdullah Al-Salim Al-Sabah Covered Halls, Sabah Al-Salem; Attendance: 150; Referees: Ismoilov, Ismoilov (UZB)
18 January 2026; 14:00	3× (suspension)	Report	1× (suspension)	Sheikh Saad Al-Abdullah Al-Salim Al-Sabah Covered Halls, Sabah Al-Salem; Attendance: 150; Referees: Ismoilov, Ismoilov (UZB)

18 January 2026; 18:00	China	29–40	Bahrain	Sheikh Saad Al-Abdullah Al-Salim Al-Sabah Covered Halls, Sabah Al-Salem; Attendance: 200; Referees: Al-Wahibi, Al-Shahi (OMA)
18 January 2026; 18:00	Song 5	(10–20)	Khamis 8	Sheikh Saad Al-Abdullah Al-Salim Al-Sabah Covered Halls, Sabah Al-Salem; Attendance: 200; Referees: Al-Wahibi, Al-Shahi (OMA)
18 January 2026; 18:00	5× (suspension)	Report	3× (suspension)	Sheikh Saad Al-Abdullah Al-Salim Al-Sabah Covered Halls, Sabah Al-Salem; Attendance: 200; Referees: Al-Wahibi, Al-Shahi (OMA)

20 January 2026; 14:00	Jordan	28–29	China	Sheikh Saad Al-Abdullah Al-Salim Al-Sabah Covered Halls, Sabah Al-Salem; Attendance: 100; Referees: Furukawa, Murata (JPN)
20 January 2026; 14:00	Abu Hasan 10	(17–17)	Song 7	Sheikh Saad Al-Abdullah Al-Salim Al-Sabah Covered Halls, Sabah Al-Salem; Attendance: 100; Referees: Furukawa, Murata (JPN)
20 January 2026; 14:00	1× (yellow card) 9× (suspension) 1× (red card)	Report	4× (suspension)	Sheikh Saad Al-Abdullah Al-Salim Al-Sabah Covered Halls, Sabah Al-Salem; Attendance: 100; Referees: Furukawa, Murata (JPN)

20 January 2026; 16:00	Iraq	18–34	Bahrain	Sheikh Saad Al-Abdullah Al-Salim Al-Sabah Covered Halls, Sabah Al-Salem; Attendance: 100; Referees: Al-Wahibi, Al-Shahi (OMA)
20 January 2026; 16:00	Al-Moulidi 7	(8–15)	Khamis 8	Sheikh Saad Al-Abdullah Al-Salim Al-Sabah Covered Halls, Sabah Al-Salem; Attendance: 100; Referees: Al-Wahibi, Al-Shahi (OMA)
20 January 2026; 16:00	1× (yellow card) 6× (suspension) 1× (red card)	Report	2× (suspension)	Sheikh Saad Al-Abdullah Al-Salim Al-Sabah Covered Halls, Sabah Al-Salem; Attendance: 100; Referees: Al-Wahibi, Al-Shahi (OMA)

=== Group C ===
Pos	Team	Pld	W	D	L	GF	GA	GD	Pts	Qualification
1	Kuwait (H)	3	3	0	0	112	59	+53	6	Group I
2	United Arab Emirates	3	2	0	1	101	69	+32	4	Group II
3	Hong Kong	3	1	0	2	82	105	−23	2	Group III
4	India	3	0	0	3	63	125	−62	0	Group IV

Source: IHF
Rules for classification: 1) points; 2) head-to-head points; 3) head-to-head goal difference; 4) head-to-head number of goals scored; 5) goal difference.
(H) Hosts

15 January 2026; 14:00	Hong Kong	21–36	United Arab Emirates	Sheikh Saad Al-Abdullah Al-Salim Al-Sabah Covered Halls, Sabah Al-Salem; Attendance: 200; Referees: Ali, Al-Aradi (BHR)
15 January 2026; 14:00	Chan T. 7	(12–18)	Radwan 8	Sheikh Saad Al-Abdullah Al-Salim Al-Sabah Covered Halls, Sabah Al-Salem; Attendance: 200; Referees: Ali, Al-Aradi (BHR)
15 January 2026; 14:00	2× (suspension)	Report	1× (suspension)	Sheikh Saad Al-Abdullah Al-Salim Al-Sabah Covered Halls, Sabah Al-Salem; Attendance: 200; Referees: Ali, Al-Aradi (BHR)

15 January 2026; 18:15	India	12–45	Kuwait	Sheikh Saad Al-Abdullah Al-Salim Al-Sabah Covered Halls, Sabah Al-Salem; Attendance: 2,500; Referees: Furukawa, Murata (JPN)
15 January 2026; 18:15	Mandeep 5	(6–25)	S. Al-Adwani 8	Sheikh Saad Al-Abdullah Al-Salim Al-Sabah Covered Halls, Sabah Al-Salem; Attendance: 2,500; Referees: Furukawa, Murata (JPN)
15 January 2026; 18:15	1× (suspension)	Report	1× (suspension)	Sheikh Saad Al-Abdullah Al-Salim Al-Sabah Covered Halls, Sabah Al-Salem; Attendance: 2,500; Referees: Furukawa, Murata (JPN)

17 January 2026; 16:00	India	21–43	United Arab Emirates	Sheikh Saad Al-Abdullah Al-Salim Al-Sabah Covered Halls, Sabah Al-Salem; Attendance: 500; Referees: Al-Suqufi, Al-Saqer (KSA)
17 January 2026; 16:00	Valiyaveettil 6	(10–21)	T. Al-Maazmi 9	Sheikh Saad Al-Abdullah Al-Salim Al-Sabah Covered Halls, Sabah Al-Salem; Attendance: 500; Referees: Al-Suqufi, Al-Saqer (KSA)
17 January 2026; 16:00	4× (suspension) 1× (red card)	Report	1× (yellow card) 3× (suspension)	Sheikh Saad Al-Abdullah Al-Salim Al-Sabah Covered Halls, Sabah Al-Salem; Attendance: 500; Referees: Al-Suqufi, Al-Saqer (KSA)

17 January 2026; 18:00	Hong Kong	25–39	Kuwait	Sheikh Saad Al-Abdullah Al-Salim Al-Sabah Covered Halls, Sabah Al-Salem; Attendance: 1,800; Referees: Gheisarian, Gheisarian (IRI)
17 January 2026; 18:00	Lee S. 6	(12–23)	Al-Harbi, Dashti 7	Sheikh Saad Al-Abdullah Al-Salim Al-Sabah Covered Halls, Sabah Al-Salem; Attendance: 1,800; Referees: Gheisarian, Gheisarian (IRI)
17 January 2026; 18:00	1× (yellow card) 2× (suspension)	Report	1× (yellow card) 3× (suspension)	Sheikh Saad Al-Abdullah Al-Salim Al-Sabah Covered Halls, Sabah Al-Salem; Attendance: 1,800; Referees: Gheisarian, Gheisarian (IRI)

19 January 2026; 16:00	India	30–36	Hong Kong	Sheikh Saad Al-Abdullah Al-Salim Al-Sabah Covered Halls, Sabah Al-Salem; Attendance: 300; Referees: Ali, Al-Aradi (BHR)
19 January 2026; 16:00	Manjeet 9	(10–16)	Lee S. 13	Sheikh Saad Al-Abdullah Al-Salim Al-Sabah Covered Halls, Sabah Al-Salem; Attendance: 300; Referees: Ali, Al-Aradi (BHR)
19 January 2026; 16:00	1× (yellow card) 2× (suspension)	Report	1× (yellow card) 4× (suspension)	Sheikh Saad Al-Abdullah Al-Salim Al-Sabah Covered Halls, Sabah Al-Salem; Attendance: 300; Referees: Ali, Al-Aradi (BHR)

19 January 2026; 18:00	United Arab Emirates	22–27	Kuwait	Sheikh Saad Al-Abdullah Al-Salim Al-Sabah Covered Halls, Sabah Al-Salem; Attendance: 3,500; Referees: Sekulić, Jovandić (SRB)
19 January 2026; 18:00	Radwan 6	(11–13)	S. Al-Adwani 8	Sheikh Saad Al-Abdullah Al-Salim Al-Sabah Covered Halls, Sabah Al-Salem; Attendance: 3,500; Referees: Sekulić, Jovandić (SRB)
19 January 2026; 18:00	4× (suspension) 1× (red card)	Report	2× (suspension)	Sheikh Saad Al-Abdullah Al-Salim Al-Sabah Covered Halls, Sabah Al-Salem; Attendance: 3,500; Referees: Sekulić, Jovandić (SRB)

=== Group D ===
Pos	Team	Pld	W	D	L	GF	GA	GD	Pts	Qualification
1	Saudi Arabia	3	3	0	0	93	70	+23	6	Group II
2	Japan	3	2	0	1	99	79	+20	4	Group I
3	Iran	3	1	0	2	90	67	+23	2	Group IV
4	Australia	3	0	0	3	60	126	−66	0	Group IV

Source: IHF
Rules for classification: 1) points; 2) head-to-head points; 3) head-to-head goal difference; 4) head-to-head number of goals scored; 5) goal difference.

15 January 2026; 16:00	Australia	23–45	Japan	Sheikh Saad Al-Abdullah Al-Salim Al-Sabah Covered Halls, Sabah Al-Salem; Attendance: 500; Referees: Al-Zayyat, Awwad (JOR)
15 January 2026; 16:00	Clowes 9	(13–22)	Nakata 7	Sheikh Saad Al-Abdullah Al-Salim Al-Sabah Covered Halls, Sabah Al-Salem; Attendance: 500; Referees: Al-Zayyat, Awwad (JOR)
15 January 2026; 16:00	3× (suspension)	Report	2× (suspension)	Sheikh Saad Al-Abdullah Al-Salim Al-Sabah Covered Halls, Sabah Al-Salem; Attendance: 500; Referees: Al-Zayyat, Awwad (JOR)

15 January 2026; 20:15	Saudi Arabia	24–22	Iran	Sheikh Saad Al-Abdullah Al-Salim Al-Sabah Covered Halls, Sabah Al-Salem; Attendance: 1,500; Referees: Sekulić, Jovandić (SRB)
15 January 2026; 20:15	Al-Mohsin 9	(15–10)	Norouzinejad 9	Sheikh Saad Al-Abdullah Al-Salim Al-Sabah Covered Halls, Sabah Al-Salem; Attendance: 1,500; Referees: Sekulić, Jovandić (SRB)
15 January 2026; 20:15	1× (yellow card) 2× (suspension)	Report	1× (yellow card) 3× (suspension) 1× (red card)	Sheikh Saad Al-Abdullah Al-Salim Al-Sabah Covered Halls, Sabah Al-Salem; Attendance: 1,500; Referees: Sekulić, Jovandić (SRB)

17 January 2026; 14:00	Australia	13–39	Iran	Sheikh Saad Al-Abdullah Al-Salim Al-Sabah Covered Halls, Sabah Al-Salem; Attendance: 300; Referees: Cha, Pak (KOR)
17 January 2026; 14:00	Gahan 7	(5–21)	Rahnama 10	Sheikh Saad Al-Abdullah Al-Salim Al-Sabah Covered Halls, Sabah Al-Salem; Attendance: 300; Referees: Cha, Pak (KOR)
17 January 2026; 14:00	1× (suspension)	Report	3× (suspension)	Sheikh Saad Al-Abdullah Al-Salim Al-Sabah Covered Halls, Sabah Al-Salem; Attendance: 300; Referees: Cha, Pak (KOR)

17 January 2026; 20:00	Saudi Arabia	27–24	Japan	Sheikh Saad Al-Abdullah Al-Salim Al-Sabah Covered Halls, Sabah Al-Salem; Attendance: 500; Referees: Cheng, Zhou (CHN)
17 January 2026; 20:00	Mo. Al-Salem 8	(12–9)	Yoshino 7	Sheikh Saad Al-Abdullah Al-Salim Al-Sabah Covered Halls, Sabah Al-Salem; Attendance: 500; Referees: Cheng, Zhou (CHN)
17 January 2026; 20:00	1× (yellow card) 4× (suspension)	Report	1× (yellow card) 4× (suspension) 1× (red card)	Sheikh Saad Al-Abdullah Al-Salim Al-Sabah Covered Halls, Sabah Al-Salem; Attendance: 500; Referees: Cheng, Zhou (CHN)

19 January 2026; 14:00	Australia	24–42	Saudi Arabia	Sheikh Saad Al-Abdullah Al-Salim Al-Sabah Covered Halls, Sabah Al-Salem; Attendance: 100; Referees: Al-Zayyat, Awwad (JOR)
19 January 2026; 14:00	four players 4	(8–23)	Al-Saffar 12	Sheikh Saad Al-Abdullah Al-Salim Al-Sabah Covered Halls, Sabah Al-Salem; Attendance: 100; Referees: Al-Zayyat, Awwad (JOR)
19 January 2026; 14:00		Report	1× (yellow card) 3× (suspension)	Sheikh Saad Al-Abdullah Al-Salim Al-Sabah Covered Halls, Sabah Al-Salem; Attendance: 100; Referees: Al-Zayyat, Awwad (JOR)

19 January 2026; 20:00	Iran	29–30	Japan	Sheikh Saad Al-Abdullah Al-Salim Al-Sabah Covered Halls, Sabah Al-Salem; Attendance: 600; Referees: Mohamed Ali, Marhoon (BHR)
19 January 2026; 20:00	Oraei 10	(15–13)	Enomoto 8	Sheikh Saad Al-Abdullah Al-Salim Al-Sabah Covered Halls, Sabah Al-Salem; Attendance: 600; Referees: Mohamed Ali, Marhoon (BHR)
19 January 2026; 20:00	6× (suspension)	Report	1× (yellow card) 1× (suspension)	Sheikh Saad Al-Abdullah Al-Salim Al-Sabah Covered Halls, Sabah Al-Salem; Attendance: 600; Referees: Mohamed Ali, Marhoon (BHR)

== Martyr Fahad Al-Ahmad Al-Sabah Cup ==
=== Group III ===
Pos	Team	Pld	W	D	L	GF	GA	GD	Pts	Qualification
1	Hong Kong	2	1	1	0	55	51	+4	3	Ninth place game
2	Jordan	2	1	0	1	52	49	+3	2	Eleventh place game
3	Oman	2	0	1	1	54	61	−7	1	13th place game

Source: IHF
Rules for classification: 1) points; 2) head-to-head points; 3) head-to-head goal difference; 4) head-to-head number of goals scored; 5) goal difference.

22 January 2026; 12:00	Jordan	31–24	Oman	Kuwait Handball Association Hall, Da'iya; Attendance: 50; Referees: Cha, Pak (KOR)
22 January 2026; 12:00	Abu Hasan 12	(16–10)	A. Al-Hadidi 8	Kuwait Handball Association Hall, Da'iya; Attendance: 50; Referees: Cha, Pak (KOR)
22 January 2026; 12:00	5× (suspension)	Report	2× (suspension)	Kuwait Handball Association Hall, Da'iya; Attendance: 50; Referees: Cha, Pak (KOR)

23 January 2026; 14:00	Hong Kong	25–21	Jordan	Kuwait Handball Association Hall, Da'iya; Attendance: 50; Referees: Al-Suqufi, Al-Saqer (KSA)
23 January 2026; 14:00	Lee S 8	(11–13)	Abu Hasan 9	Kuwait Handball Association Hall, Da'iya; Attendance: 50; Referees: Al-Suqufi, Al-Saqer (KSA)
23 January 2026; 14:00	2× (suspension)	Report	7× (suspension) 1× (red card)	Kuwait Handball Association Hall, Da'iya; Attendance: 50; Referees: Al-Suqufi, Al-Saqer (KSA)

25 January 2026; 12:00	Oman	30–30	Hong Kong	Kuwait Handball Association Hall, Da'iya; Attendance: 50; Referees: Al-Mawt, Marhoon (BHR)
25 January 2026; 12:00	S. Al-Hasani 7	(13–16)	Lin	Kuwait Handball Association Hall, Da'iya; Attendance: 50; Referees: Al-Mawt, Marhoon (BHR)
25 January 2026; 12:00	3× (suspension) 1× (red card)	Report	1× (yellow card) 4× (suspension)	Kuwait Handball Association Hall, Da'iya; Attendance: 50; Referees: Al-Mawt, Marhoon (BHR)

=== Group IV ===
Pos	Team	Pld	W	D	L	GF	GA	GD	Pts	Qualification
1	China	3	3	0	0	101	62	+39	6	Ninth place game
2	Iran	3	2	0	1	99	66	+33	4	Eleventh place game
3	Australia	3	1	0	2	75	93	−18	2	13th place game
4	India	3	0	0	3	60	114	−54	0	

Source: IHF
Rules for classification: 1) points; 2) head-to-head points; 3) head-to-head goal difference; 4) head-to-head number of goals scored; 5) goal difference.

22 January 2026; 14:30	India	16–39	Iran	Kuwait Handball Association Hall, Da'iya; Attendance: 50; Referees: Al-Suqufi, Al-Saqer (KSA)
22 January 2026; 14:30	H. Singh 6	(9–20)	Adelkhani 7	Kuwait Handball Association Hall, Da'iya; Attendance: 50; Referees: Al-Suqufi, Al-Saqer (KSA)
22 January 2026; 14:30	1× (suspension)	Report	3× (suspension)	Kuwait Handball Association Hall, Da'iya; Attendance: 50; Referees: Al-Suqufi, Al-Saqer (KSA)

22 January 2026; 17:00	Australia	19–32	China	Kuwait Handball Association Hall, Da'iya; Attendance: 100; Referees: Al-Zayyat, Awwad (JOR)
22 January 2026; 17:00	Anderson 8	(9–17)	Li S., Song 8	Kuwait Handball Association Hall, Da'iya; Attendance: 100; Referees: Al-Zayyat, Awwad (JOR)
22 January 2026; 17:00	3× (suspension)	Report	4× (suspension)	Kuwait Handball Association Hall, Da'iya; Attendance: 100; Referees: Al-Zayyat, Awwad (JOR)

23 January 2026; 16:30	Australia	17–37	Iran	Kuwait Handball Association Hall, Da'iya; Attendance: 50; Referees: Ali, Al-Aradi (BHR)
23 January 2026; 16:30	Anderson, Verdier 5	(6–14)	Rahnama 8	Kuwait Handball Association Hall, Da'iya; Attendance: 50; Referees: Ali, Al-Aradi (BHR)
23 January 2026; 16:30	3× (suspension)	Report	1× (yellow card) 3× (suspension)	Kuwait Handball Association Hall, Da'iya; Attendance: 50; Referees: Ali, Al-Aradi (BHR)

23 January 2026; 19:00	India	20–36	China	Kuwait Handball Association Hall, Da'iya; Attendance: 30; Referees: Furukawa, Murata (JPN)
23 January 2026; 19:00	Shubham 7	(9–19)	Li S. 6	Kuwait Handball Association Hall, Da'iya; Attendance: 30; Referees: Furukawa, Murata (JPN)
23 January 2026; 19:00	1× (suspension)	Report	2× (suspension)	Kuwait Handball Association Hall, Da'iya; Attendance: 30; Referees: Furukawa, Murata (JPN)

25 January 2026; 14:30	India	24–39	Australia	Kuwait Handball Association Hall, Da'iya; Attendance: 50; Referees: Al-Wahibi, Al-Shahi (OMA)
25 January 2026; 14:30	Ankit 9	(13–17)	Anderson 9	Kuwait Handball Association Hall, Da'iya; Attendance: 50; Referees: Al-Wahibi, Al-Shahi (OMA)
25 January 2026; 14:30	2× (suspension) 1× (red card)	Report	4× (suspension)	Kuwait Handball Association Hall, Da'iya; Attendance: 50; Referees: Al-Wahibi, Al-Shahi (OMA)

25 January 2026; 17:00	China	33–23	Iran	Kuwait Handball Association Hall, Da'iya; Attendance: 50; Referees: Al-Zayyat, Awwad (JOR)
25 January 2026; 17:00	Fangwei 8	(19–13)	Heidarian 8	Kuwait Handball Association Hall, Da'iya; Attendance: 50; Referees: Al-Zayyat, Awwad (JOR)
25 January 2026; 17:00	4× (suspension)	Report	1× (yellow card) 4× (suspension)	Kuwait Handball Association Hall, Da'iya; Attendance: 50; Referees: Al-Zayyat, Awwad (JOR)

=== 13th place game ===
27 January 2026; 12:00	Oman	34–28	Australia	Kuwait Handball Association Hall, Da'iya; Attendance: 30; Referees: Ahmad, Amir (IRI)
27 January 2026; 12:00	T. Al-Hadidi 11	(19–18)	Anderson 7	Kuwait Handball Association Hall, Da'iya; Attendance: 30; Referees: Ahmad, Amir (IRI)
27 January 2026; 12:00	6× (suspension)	Report	2× (suspension) 1× (red card)	Kuwait Handball Association Hall, Da'iya; Attendance: 30; Referees: Ahmad, Amir (IRI)

=== Eleventh place game ===
27 January 2026; 14:00	Jordan	10–0	Iran	Kuwait Handball Association Hall, Da'iya
27 January 2026; 14:00		Report		Kuwait Handball Association Hall, Da'iya

=== Ninth place game ===
29 January 2026; 14:00	Hong Kong	25–34	China	Sheikh Saad Al-Abdullah Al-Salim Al-Sabah Covered Halls, Sabah Al-Salem; Attendance: 100; Referees: Al-Mawt, Marhoon (BHR)
29 January 2026; 14:00	Al-Moulidi 8	(13–15)	T. Al-Maazmi 10	Sheikh Saad Al-Abdullah Al-Salim Al-Sabah Covered Halls, Sabah Al-Salem; Attendance: 100; Referees: Al-Mawt, Marhoon (BHR)
29 January 2026; 14:00	2× (suspension)	Report	3× (suspension)	Sheikh Saad Al-Abdullah Al-Salim Al-Sabah Covered Halls, Sabah Al-Salem; Attendance: 100; Referees: Al-Mawt, Marhoon (BHR)

== Main round ==
=== Group I ===
Pos	Team	Pld	W	D	L	GF	GA	GD	Pts	Qualification
1	Japan	3	2	1	0	81	79	+2	5	Semifinals
2	Kuwait (H)	3	2	0	1	87	71	+16	4	Semifinals
3	South Korea	3	1	1	1	85	84	+1	3	Fifth place game
4	Iraq	3	0	0	3	75	94	−19	0	Seventh place game

Source: IHF
Rules for classification: 1) points; 2) head-to-head points; 3) head-to-head goal difference; 4) head-to-head number of goals scored; 5) goal difference.
(H) Hosts

22 January 2026; 12:00	South Korea	23–23	Japan	Sheikh Saad Al-Abdullah Al-Salim Al-Sabah Covered Halls, Sabah Al-Salem; Attendance: 150; Referees: Al-Wahibi, Al-Shahi (OMA)
22 January 2026; 12:00	Kim Jin-y. 8	(11–10)	three players 4	Sheikh Saad Al-Abdullah Al-Salim Al-Sabah Covered Halls, Sabah Al-Salem; Attendance: 150; Referees: Al-Wahibi, Al-Shahi (OMA)
22 January 2026; 12:00	4× (suspension)	Report	1× (yellow card) 2× (suspension)	Sheikh Saad Al-Abdullah Al-Salim Al-Sabah Covered Halls, Sabah Al-Salem; Attendance: 150; Referees: Al-Wahibi, Al-Shahi (OMA)

22 January 2026; 18:00	Iraq	16–29	Kuwait	Sheikh Saad Al-Abdullah Al-Salim Al-Sabah Covered Halls, Sabah Al-Salem; Attendance: 2,500; Referees: Al-Mawt, Marhoon (BHR)
22 January 2026; 18:00	Al-Moulidi 4	(6–14)	S. Al-Adwani 8	Sheikh Saad Al-Abdullah Al-Salim Al-Sabah Covered Halls, Sabah Al-Salem; Attendance: 2,500; Referees: Al-Mawt, Marhoon (BHR)
22 January 2026; 18:00	1× (yellow card) 5× (suspension)	Report	2× (suspension)	Sheikh Saad Al-Abdullah Al-Salim Al-Sabah Covered Halls, Sabah Al-Salem; Attendance: 2,500; Referees: Al-Mawt, Marhoon (BHR)

23 January 2026; 18:00	Japan	28–27	Kuwait	Sheikh Saad Al-Abdullah Al-Salim Al-Sabah Covered Halls, Sabah Al-Salem; Attendance: 3,500; Referees: Gheisarian, Gheisarian (IRI)
23 January 2026; 18:00	Yoshino 8	(15–14)	S. Al-Adwani 8	Sheikh Saad Al-Abdullah Al-Salim Al-Sabah Covered Halls, Sabah Al-Salem; Attendance: 3,500; Referees: Gheisarian, Gheisarian (IRI)
23 January 2026; 18:00	1× (yellow card) 2× (suspension) 1× (red card)	Report	1× (yellow card) 6× (suspension)	Sheikh Saad Al-Abdullah Al-Salim Al-Sabah Covered Halls, Sabah Al-Salem; Attendance: 3,500; Referees: Gheisarian, Gheisarian (IRI)

23 January 2026; 20:00	South Korea	35–30	Iraq	Sheikh Saad Al-Abdullah Al-Salim Al-Sabah Covered Halls, Sabah Al-Salem; Attendance: 200; Referees: Cheng, Zhou (CHN)
23 January 2026; 20:00	Kim Jin-y. 9	(14–16)	Hafedh, B. Hammoodi 8	Sheikh Saad Al-Abdullah Al-Salim Al-Sabah Covered Halls, Sabah Al-Salem; Attendance: 200; Referees: Cheng, Zhou (CHN)
23 January 2026; 20:00	1× (suspension)	Report	1× (yellow card) 3× (suspension) 1× (red card)	Sheikh Saad Al-Abdullah Al-Salim Al-Sabah Covered Halls, Sabah Al-Salem; Attendance: 200; Referees: Cheng, Zhou (CHN)

25 January 2026; 12:00	Iraq	29–30	Japan	Sheikh Saad Al-Abdullah Al-Salim Al-Sabah Covered Halls, Sabah Al-Salem; Attendance: 100; Referees: Ali, Al-Aradi (BHR)
25 January 2026; 12:00	B. Hammoodi 8	(16–19)	Watanabe 7	Sheikh Saad Al-Abdullah Al-Salim Al-Sabah Covered Halls, Sabah Al-Salem; Attendance: 100; Referees: Ali, Al-Aradi (BHR)
25 January 2026; 12:00	1× (yellow card) 1× (suspension)	Report	4× (suspension)	Sheikh Saad Al-Abdullah Al-Salim Al-Sabah Covered Halls, Sabah Al-Salem; Attendance: 100; Referees: Ali, Al-Aradi (BHR)

25 January 2026; 18:00	South Korea	27–31	Kuwait	Sheikh Saad Al-Abdullah Al-Salim Al-Sabah Covered Halls, Sabah Al-Salem; Attendance: 4,500; Referees: Sekulić, Jovandić (SRB)
25 January 2026; 18:00	Kim Jin-y. 9	(15–14)	S. Ali 7	Sheikh Saad Al-Abdullah Al-Salim Al-Sabah Covered Halls, Sabah Al-Salem; Attendance: 4,500; Referees: Sekulić, Jovandić (SRB)
25 January 2026; 18:00	4× (suspension)	Report	3× (suspension)	Sheikh Saad Al-Abdullah Al-Salim Al-Sabah Covered Halls, Sabah Al-Salem; Attendance: 4,500; Referees: Sekulić, Jovandić (SRB)

=== Group II ===
Pos	Team	Pld	W	D	L	GF	GA	GD	Pts	Qualification
1	Qatar	3	2	0	1	85	76	+9	4 (Note: Qatar 2 Pts, +4 GD; Bahrain 2 Pts, +1 GD; Saudi Arabia 2 Pts, –5 GD.)	Semifinals
2	Bahrain	3	2	0	1	84	71	+13	4	Semifinals
3	Saudi Arabia	3	2	0	1	81	72	+9	4	Fifth place game
4	United Arab Emirates	3	0	0	3	59	90	−31	0	Seventh place game

Source: IHF
Rules for classification: 1) points; 2) head-to-head points; 3) head-to-head goal difference; 4) head-to-head number of goals scored; 5) goal difference.
Notes:

22 January 2026; 14:00	United Arab Emirates	20–32	Bahrain	Sheikh Saad Al-Abdullah Al-Salim Al-Sabah Covered Halls, Sabah Al-Salem; Attendance: 150; Referees: Cheng, Zhou (CHN)
22 January 2026; 14:00	Rashed 5	(10–12)	Khamis, Habib Naser 7	Sheikh Saad Al-Abdullah Al-Salim Al-Sabah Covered Halls, Sabah Al-Salem; Attendance: 150; Referees: Cheng, Zhou (CHN)
22 January 2026; 14:00	1× (yellow card) 1× (suspension) 1× (red card)	Report	2× (suspension)	Sheikh Saad Al-Abdullah Al-Salim Al-Sabah Covered Halls, Sabah Al-Salem; Attendance: 150; Referees: Cheng, Zhou (CHN)

22 January 2026; 16:00	Saudi Arabia	25–32	Qatar	Sheikh Saad Al-Abdullah Al-Salim Al-Sabah Covered Halls, Sabah Al-Salem; Attendance: 500; Referees: Ismoilov, Ismoilov (UZB)
22 January 2026; 16:00	Al-Abbas 10	(14–14)	Madadi 8	Sheikh Saad Al-Abdullah Al-Salim Al-Sabah Covered Halls, Sabah Al-Salem; Attendance: 500; Referees: Ismoilov, Ismoilov (UZB)
22 January 2026; 16:00	2× (suspension)	Report	4× (suspension)	Sheikh Saad Al-Abdullah Al-Salim Al-Sabah Covered Halls, Sabah Al-Salem; Attendance: 500; Referees: Ismoilov, Ismoilov (UZB)

23 January 2026; 14:00	Qatar	28–31	Bahrain	Sheikh Saad Al-Abdullah Al-Salim Al-Sabah Covered Halls, Sabah Al-Salem; Attendance: 500; Referees: Sekulić, Jovandić (SRB)
23 January 2026; 14:00	Carol 11	(12–12)	Al-Sayyad 11	Sheikh Saad Al-Abdullah Al-Salim Al-Sabah Covered Halls, Sabah Al-Salem; Attendance: 500; Referees: Sekulić, Jovandić (SRB)
23 January 2026; 14:00	2× (yellow card) 3× (suspension) 1× (red card)	Report	4× (suspension)	Sheikh Saad Al-Abdullah Al-Salim Al-Sabah Covered Halls, Sabah Al-Salem; Attendance: 500; Referees: Sekulić, Jovandić (SRB)

23 January 2026; 16:00	Saudi Arabia	33–19	United Arab Emirates	Sheikh Saad Al-Abdullah Al-Salim Al-Sabah Covered Halls, Sabah Al-Salem; Attendance: 500; Referees: Al-Naseem, Al-Enezi (KUW)
23 January 2026; 16:00	Mo. Al-Salem 10	(15–11)	Radwan 8	Sheikh Saad Al-Abdullah Al-Salim Al-Sabah Covered Halls, Sabah Al-Salem; Attendance: 500; Referees: Al-Naseem, Al-Enezi (KUW)
23 January 2026; 16:00	3× (suspension)	Report	1× (yellow card) 5× (suspension)	Sheikh Saad Al-Abdullah Al-Salim Al-Sabah Covered Halls, Sabah Al-Salem; Attendance: 500; Referees: Al-Naseem, Al-Enezi (KUW)

25 January 2026; 14:00	Qatar	25–20	United Arab Emirates	Sheikh Saad Al-Abdullah Al-Salim Al-Sabah Covered Halls, Sabah Al-Salem; Attendance: 100; Referees: Pak, Cha (KOR)
25 January 2026; 14:00	Hamam 8	(14–8)	T. Al-Maazmi, Afify 4	Sheikh Saad Al-Abdullah Al-Salim Al-Sabah Covered Halls, Sabah Al-Salem; Attendance: 100; Referees: Pak, Cha (KOR)
25 January 2026; 14:00	2× (suspension)	Report	1× (yellow card) 3× (suspension)	Sheikh Saad Al-Abdullah Al-Salim Al-Sabah Covered Halls, Sabah Al-Salem; Attendance: 100; Referees: Pak, Cha (KOR)

25 January 2026; 16:00	Bahrain	21–23	Saudi Arabia	Sheikh Saad Al-Abdullah Al-Salim Al-Sabah Covered Halls, Sabah Al-Salem; Attendance: 500; Referees: Ismoilov, Ismoilov (UZB)
25 January 2026; 16:00	Al-Sayyad 6	(11–10)	Al-Abbas 7	Sheikh Saad Al-Abdullah Al-Salim Al-Sabah Covered Halls, Sabah Al-Salem; Attendance: 500; Referees: Ismoilov, Ismoilov (UZB)
25 January 2026; 16:00	1× (yellow card) 3× (suspension)	Report	1× (yellow card) 2× (suspension) 2× (red card)	Sheikh Saad Al-Abdullah Al-Salim Al-Sabah Covered Halls, Sabah Al-Salem; Attendance: 500; Referees: Ismoilov, Ismoilov (UZB)

== Final round ==
=== Bracket ===
Semi-finals
27 January
Japan	25
Bahrain	35
27 January
Qatar (ET)	27
Kuwait	26

Final
29 January
Bahrain (ET)	29
Qatar	26
Third place
29 January
Japan	32
Kuwait	33

=== Semifinals ===
27 January 2026; 16:00	Japan	25–35	Bahrain	Sheikh Saad Al-Abdullah Al-Salim Al-Sabah Covered Halls, Sabah Al-Salem; Attendance: 2,000; Referees: Cheng, Zhou (CHN)
27 January 2026; 16:00	Watanabe 7	(14–17)	Khamis 10	Sheikh Saad Al-Abdullah Al-Salim Al-Sabah Covered Halls, Sabah Al-Salem; Attendance: 2,000; Referees: Cheng, Zhou (CHN)
27 January 2026; 16:00		Report	1× (yellow card) 1× (suspension)	Sheikh Saad Al-Abdullah Al-Salim Al-Sabah Covered Halls, Sabah Al-Salem; Attendance: 2,000; Referees: Cheng, Zhou (CHN)

27 January 2026
18:30
Qatar
27–26 (ET)
Kuwait
Sheikh Saad Al-Abdullah Al-Salim Al-Sabah Covered Halls, Sabah Al-Salem
Attendance: 4,500
Referees: Sekulić, Jovandić (SRB)
Madadi 9
(8–13)
S. Ali 7
2× (yellow card) 3× (suspension)
Report
1× (yellow card) 4× (suspension) 1× (red card)

FT: 22–22 ET: 5–4

=== Seventh place game ===
27 January 2026
12:00
Iraq
34–34
United Arab Emirates
Sheikh Saad Al-Abdullah Al-Salim Al-Sabah Covered Halls, Sabah Al-Salem
Attendance: 100
Referees: Marhoon, Al-Mawt (BHR)
Al-Moulidi 8
(19–17)
T. Al-Maazmi 10
2× (suspension)
Report
3× (suspension)

FT: 34–34 Pen: 4–2

=== Fifth place game ===
27 January 2026; 14:00	South Korea	32–31	Saudi Arabia	Sheikh Saad Al-Abdullah Al-Salim Al-Sabah Covered Halls, Sabah Al-Salem; Attendance: 300; Referees: Al-Naseem, Al-Enezi (KUW)
27 January 2026; 14:00	Kim T. 6	(16–16)	Mo. Al-Salem 9	Sheikh Saad Al-Abdullah Al-Salim Al-Sabah Covered Halls, Sabah Al-Salem; Attendance: 300; Referees: Al-Naseem, Al-Enezi (KUW)
27 January 2026; 14:00	1× (suspension)	Report	1× (yellow card) 6× (suspension)	Sheikh Saad Al-Abdullah Al-Salim Al-Sabah Covered Halls, Sabah Al-Salem; Attendance: 300; Referees: Al-Naseem, Al-Enezi (KUW)

=== Third place game ===
29 January 2026; 16:00	Japan	32–33	Kuwait	Sheikh Saad Al-Abdullah Al-Salim Al-Sabah Covered Halls, Sabah Al-Salem; Attendance: 1,500; Referees: Al-Shahi, Al-Wahibi (OMA)
29 January 2026; 16:00	Fujisaka 6	(16–19)	S. Al-Adwani 10	Sheikh Saad Al-Abdullah Al-Salim Al-Sabah Covered Halls, Sabah Al-Salem; Attendance: 1,500; Referees: Al-Shahi, Al-Wahibi (OMA)
29 January 2026; 16:00	3× (suspension)	Report	1× (suspension)	Sheikh Saad Al-Abdullah Al-Salim Al-Sabah Covered Halls, Sabah Al-Salem; Attendance: 1,500; Referees: Al-Shahi, Al-Wahibi (OMA)

=== Final ===
29 January 2026
18:00
Bahrain
29–26 (ET)
Qatar
Sheikh Saad Al-Abdullah Al-Salim Al-Sabah Covered Halls, Sabah Al-Salem
Attendance: 3,000
Referees: Ismoilov, Ismoilov (UZB)
Al-Sayyad, Habib Naser 7
(14–11)
Madadi 6
3× (suspension)
Report
4× (suspension)

FT: 24–24 ET: 5–2

== Final ranking ==
Pos	Team	Pld	W	D	L	GF	GA	GD	Pts	Final result
1	Bahrain	8	7	0	1	254	190	+64	14	Champions and qualified for 2027 World Championship
2	Qatar	7	4	0	3	196	178	+18	8	Runners-up and qualified for 2027 World Championship
3	Kuwait (H)	8	6	0	2	258	189	+69	12	Third place and qualified for 2027 World Championship
4	Japan	8	4	1	3	237	226	+11	9	Fourth place and qualified for 2027 World Championship
5	South Korea	6	4	1	1	178	170	+8	9	Fifth place game
6	Saudi Arabia	7	5	0	2	205	174	+31	10	Fifth place game
7	Iraq	7	3	0	4	184	207	−23	6	Seventh place game
8	United Arab Emirates	7	2	0	5	196	197	−1	4	Seventh place game
9	China	7	5	0	2	215	182	+33	10	Ninth place game
10	Hong Kong	6	2	1	3	162	190	−28	5	Ninth place game
11	Jordan	6	2	0	4	132	136	−4	4	Eleventh place game
12	Iran	7	3	0	4	189	143	+46	6	Eleventh place game
13	Oman	5	1	1	3	127	145	−18	3	Thirteenth place game
14	Australia	7	1	0	6	163	253	−90	2	Thirteenth place game
15	India	6	0	0	6	123	239	−116	0	Fifteenth place

Source: IHF
Rules for classification: 1) points; 2) head-to-head points; 3) head-to-head goal difference; 4) head-to-head number of goals scored; 5) goal difference.
(H) Hosts

== Statistics and awards ==
=== Top goalscorers ===
Rank	Name	Goals	Shots	%
1	(Kuwait) Saif Al-Adwani	54	87	62
2	(Qatar) Ahmad Madadi	44	58	76
3	(Jordan) Khaled Abu Hasan	43	65	66
3	(Bahrain) Jasim Khamis	43	57	75
5	(South Korea) Kim Jin-young	40	59	68
5	(Saudi Arabia) Mojtaba Al-Salem	40	75	63
7	(Iraq) Baderaldeen Hammoodi	39	49	80
7	(Bahrain) Mohamed Habib Naser	39	66	59
9	(Iraq) Ghassen Al-Moulidi	38	77	49
10	(Australia) Timothy Anderson	36	66	55
10	(Hong Kong) Lee Siu Chung	36	59	61

=== Top goalkeepers ===
Rank	Name	%	Saves	Shots
1	(Iran) Omidreza Robat	56	35	63
2	(Kuwait) Mohammad Buyabes	50	12	24
3	(Iran) Mohammad Siavoshi	43	41	95
4	(Iran) Saeid Barkhordari	41	32	79
5	(Bahrain) Hesham Isa	37	32	86
6	(Kuwait) Hasan Safar	36	71	196
7	(China) Zhao Kai	34	38	112
7	(United Arab Emirates) Mohammad Al-Taher	34	43	127
7	(Saudi Arabia) Ali Al-Saffar	34	27	80
7	(Saudi Arabia) Hassan Al-Turaik	34	37	110

=== All-star team ===
Position	Player
Most valuable player	(Kuwait) Hasan Safar
Goalkeeper	(Qatar) Ahmed Abdelrahem
Right wing	(Bahrain) Salman Al-Showaikh
Right back	(Japan) Jin Watanabe
Centre back	(Bahrain) Mohamed Habib Naser
Left back	(Kuwait) Saif Al-Adwani
Left wing	(Qatar) Ahmad Madadi
Pivot	(Japan) Soya Ichihara
