= Saudi Arabia men's national handball team =

Saudi Arabia

Information
- Association: Saudi Arabian Handball Federation
- Coach: Dimitris Dimitroulias
- Assistant coach: Musa Al-Hazza
- Captain: Hassan Al-Janabi

Colours
| 1st | 2nd |

Results

World Championship
- Appearances: 11 (First in 2003)
- Best result: 19th (2003, 2013)

Asian Championship
- Appearances: 17 (First in 1977)
- Best result: (bronze) 3rd (2002, 2008, 2012, 2022)
- Last updated on Unknown.

The Saudi Arabia national handball team is the national handball team of Saudi Arabia and is controlled by the Saudi Arabian Handball Federation. The team has participated in the 2003 World Men's Handball Championship and 2009.

== Results ==
=== World Championship ===
| Year | Round | Position | GP | W | D | L | GS | GA |
|---|---|---|---|---|---|---|---|---|
| (Nazi Germany) 1938 | Not a IHF member | | | | | | | |
| (Sweden) 1954 | Not a IHF member | | | | | | | |
| (East Germany) 1958 | Not a IHF member | | | | | | | |
| (West Germany) 1961 | Not a IHF member | | | | | | | |
| (Czechoslovakia) 1964 | Not a IHF member | | | | | | | |
| (Sweden) 1967 | Not a IHF member | | | | | | | |
| (France) 1970 | Not a IHF member | | | | | | | |
| (East Germany) 1974 | Not a IHF member | | | | | | | |
| (Denmark) 1978 | did not enter | | | | | | | |
| (West Germany) 1982 | did not enter | | | | | | | |
| (Switzerland) 1986 | did not enter | | | | | | | |
| (Czechoslovakia) 1990 | did not enter | | | | | | | |
| (Sweden) 1993 | did not enter | | | | | | | |
| (Iceland) 1995 | did not enter | | | | | | | |
| (Japan) 1997 | Preliminary round | 21st | 5 | 0 | 0 | 5 | 94 | 126 |
| (Egypt) 1999 | Preliminary round | 22nd | 5 | 0 | 0 | 5 | 101 | 132 |
| (France) 2001 | First round | 21st | 5 | 0 | 0 | 5 | 92 | 134 |
| (Portugal) 2003 | First round | 19th | 5 | 1 | 0 | 4 | 114 | 155 |
| (Tunisia) 2005 | did not qualify | | | | | | | |
| (Germany) 2007 | did not qualify | | | | | | | |
| (Croatia) 2009 | President's Cup | 23rd | 9 | 1 | 0 | 8 | 193 | 272 |
| (Sweden) 2011 | did not qualify | | | | | | | |
| (Spain) 2013 | President's Cup | 19th | 7 | 2 | 0 | 5 | 152 | 203 |
| (Qatar) 2015 | President's Cup | 22nd | 7 | 1 | 0 | 6 | 136 | 216 |
| (France) 2017 | President's Cup | 20th | 7 | 1 | 0 | 6 | 175 | 220 |
| (Denmark) (Germany) 2019 | President's Cup | 21st | 7 | 2 | 0 | 5 | 173 | 214 |
| (Egypt) 2021 | did not qualify | | | | | | | |
| (Poland) (Sweden) 2023 | President's Cup | 29th | 7 | 2 | 0 | 5 | 172 | 218 |
| (Croatia) (Denmark) (Norway) 2025 | did not quality | | | | | | | |
| (Germany) 2027 | qualified | | | | | | | |
| (France) (Germany) 2029 | to be determinded | | | | | | | |
| (Denmark) (Iceland) (Norway) 2031 | to be determinded | | | | | | | |
| Total | 11/30 | | 64 | 10 | 0 | 54 | 1402 | 1890 |

=== Asian Championship ===
| Year | Round |
|---|---|
| Kuwait 1977 | 8th |
| China 1979 | did not qualify |
| South Korea 1983 | 5th |
| Jordan 1987 | did not qualify |
| China 1989 | 5th |
| Japan 1991 | 10th |
| Bahrain 1993 | 4th |
| Kuwait 1995 | did not qualify |
| Japan 2000 | Withdrew |
| Iran 2002 | 3rd |
| Qatar 2004 | 5th |
| Thailand 2006 | Withdrew |
| Iran 2008 | 3rd |
| Lebanon 2010 | 4th |
| Saudi Arabia 2012 | 3rd |
| Bahrain 2014 | 6th |
| Bahrain 2016 | 4th |
| South Korea 2018 | 4th |
| Kuwait 2020 | 7th |
| Saudi Arabia 2022 | 3rd |
| Bahrain 2024 | 9th |
| Kuwait 2026 | 6th |

== Current squad ==
Squad for the 2023 World Men's Handball Championship.

Head coach: Jan Pytlick

| No. | Pos. | Name | Date of birth (age) | Height | App. | Goals | Club |
|---|---|---|---|---|---|---|---|
| 1 | GK | Amro Mohammed | 28 June 1989 (age 37) | 1.92 m | 60 | 0 | (Saudi Arabia) Al-Ahli Club |
| 3 | LW | Abdullah Al-Abbas | 30 January 1992 (age 34) | 1.69 m | 21 | 55 | (Saudi Arabia) Al-Noor Club |
| 4 | P | Hussain Al-Tarouti | 2 November 1999 (age 26) | 1.84 m | 33 | 23 | (Saudi Arabia) Al-Noor Club |
| 5 | P | Hassan Al-Janabi (c) | 25 July 1983 (age 43) | 1.86 m | 54 | 66 | (Saudi Arabia) Mudhar |
| 6 | RW | Hussain Furaij | 1 July 2004 (age 22) | 1.79 m | 22 | 34 | (Saudi Arabia) Al-Noor Club |
| 8 | CB | Hadi Quraish | 25 February 1999 (age 27) | 1.71 m | 7 | 16 | (Saudi Arabia) Al Safa |
| 10 | RB | Haidar Al-Hassan | 12 November 2000 (age 25) | 1.84 m | 22 | 45 | (Saudi Arabia) Al Safa |
| 14 | LB | Abdullah Al-Hammad | 10 October 1990 (age 36) | 1.88 m | 23 | 44 | (Saudi Arabia) Al Houda |
| 15 | RW | Ahmed Al-Abdulali | 18 June 1988 (age 38) | 1.84 m | 41 | 55 | (Saudi Arabia) Mudhar |
| 16 | GK | Mohammad Al-Salem | 3 April 1986 (age 40) | 1.89 m | 42 | 0 | (Saudi Arabia) Khaleej Club |
| 19 | RB | Abdulrahman Al-Muwallad | 16 June 1994 (age 32) | 1.92 m | 18 | 60 | (Saudi Arabia) Al Wehda Club |
| 22 | LB | Mahdi Al-Salem | 16 February 1990 (age 36) | 1.86 m | 133 | 429 | (Saudi Arabia) Al Houda |
| 23 | LW | Abdullah Al-Hulaili | 16 June 1994 (age 32) | 1.75 m | 34 | 76 | (Saudi Arabia) Mudhar |
| 34 | GK | Ali Al-Saffar | 9 February 1995 (age 31) | 1.85 m | 14 | 0 | (Saudi Arabia) Mudhar |
| 37 | CB | Mohammed Al-Abbas | 19 December 1992 (age 33) | 1.80 m | 35 | 20 | (Saudi Arabia) Mudhar |
| 57 | CB | Mojtaba Al-Salem | 15 June 1994 (age 32) | 1.81 m | 6 | 7 | (Saudi Arabia) Al-Noor Club |
| 59 | RW | Hassan Al-Turaiki | 8 April 2004 (age 22) | 1.77 m | 25 | 31 | (Saudi Arabia) Khaleej Club |
| 77 | LB | Marhoon Al-Maa | 13 May 1988 (age 38) | 1.89 m | 23 | 35 | (Saudi Arabia) Khaleej Club |
| 89 | P | Yousof Al-Taweel | 7 November 1999 (age 26) | 1.88 m | 33 | 13 | (Saudi Arabia) Al Safa |
| 97 | CB | Sadiq Al-Mohsin | 23 October 1997 (age 29) | 1.80 m | 26 | 33 | (Saudi Arabia) Khaleej Club |
