= Kuwait men's national handball team =

Kuwait

Information
- Nickname: Al Azraq (The Blue)
- Association: Kuwait Handball Association
- Coach: Aron Kristjánsson
- Assistant coach: Cheikh Aymen; Heine Jensen; Marouen Maggaiz
- Most caps: Mohamed Messaoudene

Colours
| 1st | 2nd |

Results

Summer Olympics
- Appearances: 2 (First in 1980)
- Best result: 12th (1980, 1996)

World Championship
- Appearances: 10 (First in 1982)
- Best result: 15th (1982)

Asian Championship
- Appearances: 18 (First in 1977)
- Best result: (gold) 1st (1995, 2002, 2004, 2006)
- Last updated on Unknown.

Kuwait men's national handball team
Medal record

Asian Games
| Gold medal – first place | 2006 Doha | Team |
| Silver medal – second place | 1998 Bangkok | Team |
| Silver medal – second place | 2002 Busan | Team |
| Bronze medal – third place | 2022 Hangzhou | Team |

The Kuwait national handball team is controlled by the Kuwait Handball Association. It is highly regarded as one of the most successful national handball teams in Asia and the Arab World. Kuwait has enjoyed great handball success at both the national and club level. The sport is widely considered to be the national icon of Kuwait, although football is more popular among the overall population. Kuwait's golden decade existed from the late 1990s to the late 2000s. Kuwait is also the founding member of the Asian Handball Federation, the Asian Championship and Club Champions League.

On 15 September 2015, the International Handball Federation suspended Kuwait Handball Association.

== Results ==
=== Summer Olympics ===
- 1980 – 12th place
- 1996 – 12th place

=== World Championship ===
- 1982 – 15th place
- 1995 – 20th place
- 1999 – 19th place
- 2001 – 23rd place
- 2003 – 20th place
- 2005 – 22nd place
- 2007 – 18th place
- 2009 – 22nd place
- 2025 – 27th place
- 2027 – Qualified

=== Asian Championship ===
| Year | Round |
|---|---|
| Kuwait 1977 | Fourth place |
| China 1979 | Third place |
| South Korea 1983 | Third place |
| Jordan 1987 | Third place |
| China 1989 | Third place |
| Japan 1991 | Eighth place |
| Bahrain 1993 | Runners-up |
| Kuwait 1995 | Champions |
| Japan 2000 | Withdrew |
| Iran 2002 | Champions |
| Qatar 2004 | Champions |
| Thailand 2006 | Champions |
| Iran 2008 | Runners-up |
| Lebanon 2010 | Suspended |
| Saudi Arabia 2012 | Eighth place |
| Bahrain 2014 | Seventh place |
| Kuwait 2020 | Eighth place |
| Saudi Arabia 2022 | Seventh place |
| Bahrain 2024 | Fourth place |
| 2026 Kuwait | Third place |

**Gold background color indicates that the tournament was won.
Red border color indicates tournament was held on home :soil.
***Following the IOC decision to suspend the NOC of Kuwait which came in force on 1 January 2010, the International Handball Federation decided to suspend handball in Kuwait in all categories.

=== Asian Games ===
- New Delhi 1982 – 4th
- Seoul 1986 – 4th
- Hiroshima 1994 – 4th
- Bangkok 1998 – Silver Medal
- Busan 2002 – Silver Medal
- Doha 2006 – Gold Medal
- Incheon 2014 – 5th
- Hangzhou 2022 – Bronze Medal

== Team ==
=== Current squad ===
Roster for the 2025 World Men's Handball Championship.

Head coach: Said Hadjazi

| No. | Pos. | Name | Date of birth (age) | Height | App. | Goals | Club |
|---|---|---|---|---|---|---|---|
| 5 | CB | Abdullah Al-Khamees | 23 June 1992 (age 34) | 1.86 m | 54 | 42 | Kuwait SC |
| 6 | RW | Saleh Ali | 28 September 1990 (age 36) | 1.73 m | 45 | 67 | Kuwait SC |
| 7 | LW | Abdulaziz Al-Shammari | 8 August 1992 (age 34) | 1.81 m | 32 | 35 | Kuwait SC |
| 18 | P | Mohammad Al-Sanea | 21 May 1996 (age 30) | 1.87 m | 7 | 14 | (Kuwait) Qadsia SC |
| 19 | RB | Mohammad Al-Hendal | 19 October 1997 (age 29) | 1.88 m | 17 | 30 | (Kuwait) Al-Fahaheel SC |
| 20 | RW | Mishaal Al-Harbi | 8 June 1992 (age 34) | 1.74 m | 37 | 35 | Kuwait SC |
| 22 | GK | Hasan Safar | 7 December 1998 (age 27) | 1.87 m | 25 | 2 | Kuwait SC |
| 23 | LB | Saif Al-Adwani | 17 April 2002 (age 24) | 1.89 m | 25 | 63 | Kuwait SC |
| 24 | LB | Mohammad Radhei | 2 July 1996 (age 30) | 1.93 m | 26 | 24 | Kuwait SC |
| 37 | CB | Saleh Al-Raghaib | 26 August 2005 (age 21) | 1.79 m | 15 | 28 | (Kuwait) Burgan SC |
| 44 | P | Mohammad Ghadnafar | 25 June 1996 (age 30) | 1.91 m | 12 | 13 | (Kuwait) Burgan SC |
| 49 | LB | Fawaz Mubarak | 19 August 1998 (age 28) | 1.95 m | 15 | 18 | (Kuwait) Al-Arabi SC |
| 66 | CB | Abdulaziz Salmeen | 31 May 1999 (age 27) | 1.74 m | 19 | 26 | (Kuwait) Qadsia SC |
| 72 | P | Abdulrahman Al-Shammari | 16 September 2002 (age 24) | 1.94 m | 15 | 31 | (Kuwait) Kazma SC |
| 79 | RB | Ali Jaafar | 7 December 2002 (age 23) | 1.79 m | 13 | 34 | (Kuwait) Al-Arabi SC |
| 80 | GK | Abdulaziz Al-Thafiri | 11 July 1993 (age 33) | 1.89 m | 32 | 1 | (Kuwait) Kazma SC |
| 84 | LW | Haider Dashti | 5 December 2000 (age 25) | 1.92 m | 26 | 34 | (Kuwait) Al-Salmiya SC |
| 97 | GK | Mohammad Buyabes | 9 June 1997 (age 29) | 1.92 m | 18 | 0 | (Kuwait) Burgan SC |

.

=== Notable National coaches ===
- János Adorján 1980
- Anatoly Yevtushenko 1993–1995
- Ilija Puljević 1995–1996
- Velimir Kljaić 2001–2002
- Zoran Živković 2009–?
- Tonči Drušković 2014–2016
- Said Hadjazi 2023–2025
- Aron Kristjánsson 2025–
