= Hiroyasu Tamakawa =

Japanese handball player (born 1995)

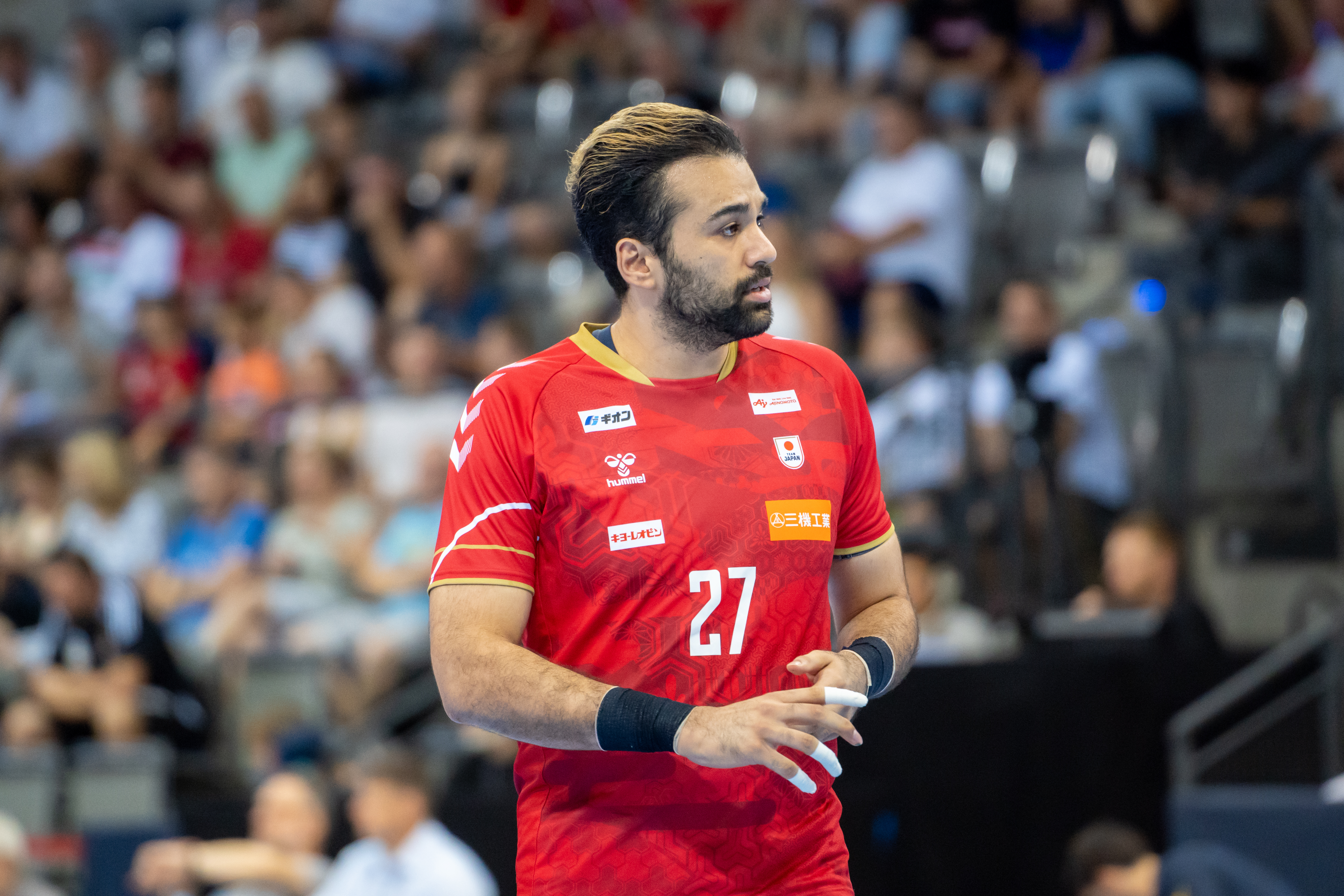

Personal information
- Nationality: Japanese
- Born: 27 April 1995 (age 31)
- Height: 1.98 m (6 ft 6 in)

Sport
- Sport: Handball
- Position: Pivot
- Current club: Daido Steel
National team
Years	Team	Apps	(Gls)
–	Japan	38	(1)
Medal record
Men's handball
Representing Japan
Asian Games
Bronze medal – third place	2026 Aichi–Nagoya	Team
Asian Championship
Silver medal – second place	2024 Bahrain

Hiroyasu Tamakawa (玉川 裕康, Tamakawa Hiroyasu; born 27 April 1995) is a Japanese (of Iranian father) handball player for Daido Steel and the Japanese national team.

He participated at the 2017 World Men's Handball Championship.
