= Mohamed Habib Naser =

Bahraini handball player

Personal information
- Full name: Mohamed Habib Naser Mohamed
- Nationality: Bahraini
- Born: 7 February 2001 (age 25)
- Height: 1.79 m (5 ft 10 in)

Sport
- Sport: Handball
- Position: Center Back
- Current club: Al-Najma
- Number: 95
National team
Years	Team	Apps	(Gls)
–	Bahrain	68	(110)
Medal record
Men's handball
Representing Bahrain
Asian Games
Gold medal – first place	2026 Aichi–Nagoya	Team
Silver medal – second place	2022 Hangzhou	Team
Asian Championship
Gold medal – first place	2026 Kuwait
Silver medal – second place	2022 Saudi Arabia
Bronze medal – third place	2024 Bahrain
Islamic Solidarity Games
Gold medal – first place	2025 Riyadh	Team

Mohamed Habib Naser Mohamed (Arabic: محمد حبيب ناصر محمد, born 7 February 2001), known as Mohamed Mohamed or Mohamed Habib Naser, is a Bahraini handball player for the Al-Najma and Bahraini national team. He competed in the 2020 Summer Olympics.

== Individual awards ==
All-Star Team

- All-Star Centre Back of the Asian Championship: 2026
