= Chung Hyung-kyun =

South Korean handball coach, referee and administrator (born 1955)

Olympic medal record

Women's handball

Representing South Korea
Gold medal – first place	1992 Barcelona	Coach
Silver medal – second place	1996 Atlanta	Coach

World Championship
Gold medal – first place	1995 Austria/Hungary	Coach

Asian Games
Gold medal – first place	1992 Hiroshima	Coach

Asian Championship
Silver medal – second place	1977 Kuwait	Player

Chung Hyung-kyun (Korean: 정형균, born 24 January 1955) is a South Korean handball coach, administrator, and referee and former player. Considered a legend of South Korean handball, he coached the South Korean women's team to gold medals at the 1992 Summer Olympics and at the 1995 World Women's Handball Championship. He also led the team to a silver medal at the 1996 Summer Olympics, where South Korea lost to Denmark. He is nicknamed the 'Handball Czar'

== Career ==
The 1995 World Championship title made South Korea the first non-European team to win the title, and by 2026 the only Asian team to win the title. With South Korea he also won a gold medal at the 1994 Asian games.

Afterwards he coached the Chinese women's team. He managed to qualify them for the 2004 Olympics, and guided them to the quarterfinals, where they lost to Denmark. He left the team after this tournament.

In April 2012 he was elected the chairperson of the East Asian Handball Federation. Prior to that he was the Vice-president of the Korea Handball Federation. In December 2025 he was elected to the Asian Handball Federation council for the 2025-2029 term.

As a player he won silver medals at the inaugural 1977 Asian Championship.
