= Hassan Al-Janabi =

Saudi Arabian handball player

Personal information
- Nationality: Saudi Arabian
- Born: 25 July 1983 (age 43)
- Height: 1.86 m (6 ft 1 in)

Sport
- Sport: Handball
- Position: Pivot
- Current club: Mudhar
- Number: 5
National team
Years	Team	Apps	(Gls)
–	Saudi Arabia	83	(99)
Medal record
Asian Championship
Bronze medal – third place	2022 Saudi Arabia

Hassan Al-Janabi (Arabic: حسن الجنبي; born 25 July 1983) is a Saudi Arabian handball player for captains both Mudhar and the Saudi Arabian national team.
