= Thailand men's national handball team =

Thailand

Information
- Association: Handball Association of Thailand

Colours
1st	2nd

Results

Asian Championship
- Appearances: 1 (First in 2006)
- Best result: 9th (2006)
- Last updated on Unknown.

The Thailand national handball team is the national handball team of Thailand.

== Results ==
=== Asian Championship ===
- 2006 – 9th

=== Asian Games ===
- Handball at the 1998 Asian Games – Men's tournament
- Handball at the 2022 Asian Games – Men's tournament

=== SEA Games ===
- 2003 SEA Games
- 2007 SEA Games
- 2021 SEA Games
- 2025 SEA Games
