= 2002 Asian Men's Handball Championship =

2002 Asian Championship
Tournament details
- Host country: Iran
- Venue: 1 (in 1 host city)
- Dates: 10–19 February
- Teams: 7 (from 1 confederation)

Final positions
- Champions: Kuwait (2nd title)
- Runners-up: Qatar
- Third place: Saudi Arabia
- Fourth place: South Korea

Tournament statistics
- Matches played: 14
- Goals scored: 682 (48.71 per match)

The 2002 Asian Men's Handball Championship was the tenth Asian Championship. It took place from 10 to 19 February 2002 in Isfahan, Iran. The championship was held in Isfahan's Pirouzi Arena. It acted as the Asian qualifying tournament for the 2003 World Men's Handball Championship.

== Draw ==
Group A	Group B
Kuwait; Iran; Qatar; Bahrain	South Korea; Saudi Arabia; Japan

== Preliminary round ==
All times are local (UTC+3:30).

=== Group A ===
Team	Pld	W	D	L	GF	GA	GD	Pts
Kuwait	3	2	0	1	67	68	−1	4
Qatar	3	2	0	1	54	42	+12	4
Iran (H)	3	1	1	1	75	71	+4	3
Bahrain	3	0	1	2	50	65	−15	1

(H) Hosts

10 February 2002; 14:30	Kuwait	19–18	Qatar	Pirouzi Arena, Isfahan
10 February 2002; 14:30		(10–11)		Pirouzi Arena, Isfahan

10 February 2002; 17:00	Iran	26–26	Bahrain	Pirouzi Arena, Isfahan
10 February 2002; 17:00		(12–13)		Pirouzi Arena, Isfahan

12 February 2002; 15:00	Kuwait	29–24	Bahrain	Pirouzi Arena, Isfahan
12 February 2002; 15:00		(14–13)		Pirouzi Arena, Isfahan

12 February 2002; 17:00	Iran	23–26	Qatar	Pirouzi Arena, Isfahan
12 February 2002; 17:00		(10–14)		Pirouzi Arena, Isfahan

14 February 2002; 15:00	Qatar	10–0	Bahrain	Pirouzi Arena, Isfahan
14 February 2002; 15:00		(Bahrain walked out)		Pirouzi Arena, Isfahan

14 February 2002; 17:00	Kuwait	19–26	Iran	Pirouzi Arena, Isfahan
14 February 2002; 17:00		(8–13)		Pirouzi Arena, Isfahan

=== Group B ===
Team	Pld	W	D	L	GF	GA	GD	Pts
South Korea	2	1	0	1	51	50	+1	2
Saudi Arabia	2	1	0	1	48	48	0	2
Japan	2	1	0	1	40	41	−1	2

11 February 2002; 17:00	South Korea	23–20	Japan	Pirouzi Arena, Isfahan
11 February 2002; 17:00		(12–11)		Pirouzi Arena, Isfahan

13 February 2002; 17:00	Japan	20–18	Saudi Arabia	Pirouzi Arena, Isfahan
13 February 2002; 17:00		(10–8)		Pirouzi Arena, Isfahan

15 February 2002; 17:00	South Korea	28–30	Saudi Arabia	Pirouzi Arena, Isfahan
15 February 2002; 17:00		(11–13)		Pirouzi Arena, Isfahan

== Placement 5th/6th ==
18 February 2002; 17:00	Iran	29–25	Japan	Pirouzi Arena, Isfahan; Referees: Al-Dossary, Al-Qarni (KSA)
18 February 2002; 17:00		(16–13)		Pirouzi Arena, Isfahan; Referees: Al-Dossary, Al-Qarni (KSA)

== Final round ==
Semifinals
17 February – Isfahan
Kuwait	30
Saudi Arabia	27
17 February – Isfahan
South Korea	28
Qatar	33

Gold medal match
19 February – Isfahan
Kuwait	29
Qatar	25
Bronze medal match
19 February – Isfahan
Saudi Arabia	38
South Korea	33

=== Semifinals ===
17 February 2002; 15:00	Kuwait	30–27	Saudi Arabia	Pirouzi Arena, Isfahan; Referees: Al-Mulla, Al-Zarraa (QAT)
17 February 2002; 15:00		(16–16)		Pirouzi Arena, Isfahan; Referees: Al-Mulla, Al-Zarraa (QAT)

17 February 2002; 17:00	South Korea	23–28	Qatar	Pirouzi Arena, Isfahan; Referees: Al-Shuwairbat, Abulrethaei (KUW)
17 February 2002; 17:00		(14–16)		Pirouzi Arena, Isfahan; Referees: Al-Shuwairbat, Abulrethaei (KUW)

=== Bronze medal match ===
19 February 2002; 15:00	Saudi Arabia	38–33	South Korea	Pirouzi Arena, Isfahan; Referees: Al-Busaidi, Al-Bulushi (OMA)
19 February 2002; 15:00		(17–14)		Pirouzi Arena, Isfahan; Referees: Al-Busaidi, Al-Bulushi (OMA)

=== Gold medal match ===
19 February 2002; 17:00	Kuwait	29–25	Qatar	Pirouzi Arena, Isfahan; Referees: Kouzehgari, Hayatpour (IRI)
19 February 2002; 17:00		(14–10)		Pirouzi Arena, Isfahan; Referees: Kouzehgari, Hayatpour (IRI)

== Final standing ==
Rank	Team
1st place, gold medalist(s)	Kuwait
2nd place, silver medalist(s)	Qatar
3rd place, bronze medalist(s)	Saudi Arabia
4	South Korea
5	Iran
6	Japan
7	Bahrain

Team qualified for the 2003 World Championship

== All-star team ==
- Goalkeeper: Yousef Al-Fadhli (KUW)
- Left wing: Nabil Al-Obaidi (KSA)
- Left back: Ahmed Saad Al-Saad (QAT)
- Pivot: Mohsen Taheri (IRI)
- Centre back: Daisuke Miyazaki (JPN)
- Right back: Cho Hyun-chul (KOR)
- Right wing: Husain Siwan (KUW)
