= Mohsen Taheri =

Iranian handball player

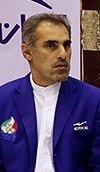
- Taheri in 2015

President of Sepahan
- In office 10 October 2016 – 20 January 2018
- Preceded by: Asghar Bagherian
- Succeeded by: Masoud Tabesh

Personal details
- Born: Mohsen Taheri; March 21, 1968 (age 58) Khorramabad, Iran
- Height: 1.88 m (6 ft 2 in)
- Occupation: Handball player and coach
- Handball career
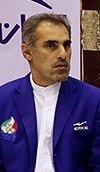
- Sport: Handball
- Position: Pivot (handball)

Senior clubs
- Years: Team
- 1995–2004: Sepahan
National team
- Years: Team
- 1985–2004: Iran (player)
- since 2004: lecturer of Iraninan Handball Federation
- 2004: Olympic solidarity technical course Iran (coach)
- 2005: Symposium Bangkok, Tailand for coaches (coach)
- 2006: Olympics games DOHA qatar (coach)
- 2010: Asian youth champion abu dhabi U.E.A (head coach)

Teams managed
- 2006–2007: Foolad Mobarakeh Sepahan (assistant)
- 2007–2008: Foolad Mobarakeh Sepahan (head coach)
- 2009–2010: Daneshgah Azad Tehran (head coach)
- 2011–2012: Naft and Gaz Gachsaran (head coach)
- 2012–2014: Parsian Tehran (head coach)
- 2014–2016: Foolad Sepahan novin (head coach)
- 2017-2021: Foolad Mobarakeh Sepahan (head coach)

Mohsen Taheri is an Iranian former handball player and coach and a football administrator. He was the president and member of the director board of Sepahan F.C. club from 2016 until 2018.

== Club achievements ==
He was player and captain of the Sepahan F.C. handball club between 1995 and 2004. He has 10 championships in Iran's Handball League and Knock-out Cup.

=== Other achievements ===
- second place in Asian Club League Handball Championship 2004 in Tehran.
- Third place with Zob Ahan Esfahan F.C. in Asian Club League Handball Championship in Jordan 1998.
- As an assistant coach, champion of Iranian Premier Handball League 2006, 2007 with Sepahan F.C. club.
- As a head coach of Sepahan F.C. club, 3rd place in Asian Club League Handball Championship in Kuwait 2007.
- Being the head coach in Azad University club, Naft Gachsaran, Parsian Tehran and Sepahan F.C. Handball club.
- As a player, he played in the Shahid Karimi Khoram Abad, Homa Tehran, Entezam Isfahan, Entezam Tehran, Shahrdari Arak and Sepahan F.C.

== Iran men's national handball team achievement ==
- Iran men's national handball team player from 1985 to 2004.
- Eight years the captain of the Iran men's national handball team.
- Fourth place in Beach handball at the World Games, 2001, Akita, Japan.
- As an assistant coach, 3rd place in 2006 Asian Games.
- As a head coach, 5th place in Asian Men's Youth Handball Championship, Abu Dhabi, UAE, 2014.
- As a head coach, 4th place in Asian Men's Junior Handball Championship, Tabriz, Iran, 2014.
- As an assistant coach, 2nd place in Handball at the 2016 Summer Olympics – Men's qualification, Duha, Qatar, 2015.
- As an assistant coach, 5th place in Asian Men's Handball Championship, Manama, Bahrain, 2016.

== Individual achievement ==
- All-star Team in Asia, Best Pivot, 2002.
- Best Pivot of Asian Club League Handball Championship 1999, 2001, and 2004.
- Holder of International Coaching Certification "Global Coaching"2011.
