= Bahrain men's national handball team =

Bahrain

Information
- Association: Bahrain Handball Federation
- Coach: Robert Hedin
- Assistant coach: Ameen Ali; Makram Missaoui

Colours
| 1st | 2nd |

Results

World Championship
- Appearances: 7 (First in 2011)
- Best result: 16th (2023)

Asian Championship
- Appearances: 19 (First in 1977)
- Best result: (gold) 1st (2026)
- Last updated on Unknown.

The Bahrain national handball team is the national handball team of Bahrain and is controlled by the Bahrain Handball Federation. In May 2025 Robert Hedin was appointed to the position as head coach.

In January 2022 Bahrain led by Aron Kristjánsson made it to the final of the 2022 Asian Men's Handball Championship, getting to the final for the fifth time in seven tournaments. They would go on to lose to Qatar in the final. Four years later in a rematch in the final, they eventually won their first title over Qatar in 2026.

== Results ==
=== Olympic Games ===
| Year | Round | Position | GP | W | D* | L | GS | GA |
|---|---|---|---|---|---|---|---|---|
| (Japan) 2020 | Quarterfinals | 8th | 6 | 1 | 0 | 5 | 157 | 191 |

=== World Championship ===
| Year | Round | Position | GP | W | D* | L | GS | GA |
|---|---|---|---|---|---|---|---|---|
| (Sweden) 2011 | preliminary round | 23 | 7 | 2 | 0 | 5 | 168 | 226 |
| (Qatar) 2015 | Qualified after ranking 2nd in 2014 Asian Championship, but withdrawn from the competition | | | | | | | |
| (France) 2017 | preliminary round | 23 | 7 | 1 | 0 | 6 | 172 | 213 |
| (Denmark) / (Germany) 2019 | preliminary round | 20 | 7 | 1 | 0 | 6 | 161 | 212 |
| (Egypt) 2021 | main round | 21 | 6 | 1 | 0 | 5 | 141 | 170 |
| (Poland) (Sweden) 2023 | main round | 16 | 6 | 2 | 1 | 3 | 164 | 187 |
| (Croatia) (Denmark) (Norway) 2025 | preliminary round | 29 | 7 | 2 | 0 | 5 | 194 | 210 |
| (Germany) 2027 | Qualified | | | | | | | |
| (France) (Germany) 2029 | TBD | | | | | | | |
| (Denmark) (Iceland) (Norway) 2031 | TBD | | | | | | | |

=== Asian Championship ===
| Year | Round | Position |
|---|---|---|
| (Kuwait) 1977 | preliminary round | 6 |
| (Korea) 1983 | Bronze Medal Match | 4 |
| (Jordan) 1987 | preliminary round | 5 |
| (Japan) 1991 | preliminary round | 5 |
| (Bahrain) 1993 | preliminary round | 6 |
| (Kuwait) 1995 | Bronze Medal Match | 3 |
| (Iran) 2002 | preliminary round | 7 |
| (Qatar) 2004 | Bronze Medal Match | 4 |
| (Thailand) 2006 | preliminary round | 6 |
| (Iran) 2008 | preliminary round | 10 |
| (Lebanon) 2010 | Final | 2 |
| (Saudi Arabia) 2012 | preliminary round | 6 |
| (Bahrain) 2014 | Final | 2 |
| (Bahrain) 2016 | Final | 2 |
| (South Korea) 2018 | Final | 2 |
| (Kuwait) 2020 | Bronze Medal Match | 4 |
| (Saudi Arabia) 2022 | Final | 2 |
| (Bahrain) 2024 | Bronze Medal Match | 3 |
| (Kuwait) 2026 | Champions | 1 |
| (Bahrain) 2028 | Qualified | |

== Current squad ==
Squad for the 2025 World Men's Handball Championship.

Head coach: (Iceland) Aron Kristjánsson

| No. | Pos. | Name | Date of birth (age) | Height | App. | Goals | Club |
|---|---|---|---|---|---|---|---|
| 3 | P | Ali Abdulla Eid | 18 January 1991 (age 35) | 1.74 m | 88 | 165 | (Bahrain) Al-Najma |
| 9 | LW | Hasan Al-Samahiji | 22 February 1991 (age 35) | 1.78 m | 95 | 270 | (Bahrain) Al-Ahli |
| 10 | LB | Mohamed Rabia | 14 January 2003 (age 23) | 1.86 m | 30 | 35 | (Bahrain) Al-Ahli |
| 12 | GK | Hesham Isa | 5 January 2003 (age 23) | 1.91 m | 26 | 15 | (Bahrain) Al Dair Sports Club |
| 14 | RW | Qasim Qambar | 21 August 2001 (age 24) | 1.75 m | 36 | 56 | (Bahrain) Al-Najma |
| 17 | LB | Ahmed Kadhem | 9 May 2003 (age 23) | 1.92 m | 10 | 12 | (Bahrain) Al-Shabab |
| 19 | P | Mohamed Ali | 17 April 1987 (age 39) | 1.91 m | 118 | 87 | (Bahrain) Al-Najma |
| 22 | RW | Husain Ali | 2 July 2001 (age 25) | 1.76 m | 5 | 1 | (Bahrain) Al Dair Sports Club |
| 23 | CB | Mujtaba Al-Zaimoor | 8 May 2000 (age 26) | 1.77 m | 26 | 44 | (Bahrain) Al-Shabab |
| 24 | LB | Abdulla Abdulkarim | 25 January 2002 (age 24) | 1.84 m | 10 | 9 | (Bahrain) Al-Najma |
| 29 | LB | Abdulla Al-Zaimoor | 6 October 1998 (age 27) | 1.81 m | 51 | 65 | (Bahrain) Al-Shabab |
| 77 | RB | Jassim Khamis | 2 September 2002 (age 23) | 1.78 m | 11 | 5 | (Bahrain) Al-Shabab |
| 89 | P | Mahmood Al-Falahi | 16 March 2004 (age 22) | 1.84 m | 10 | 15 | (Bahrain) Tubli Sports Club |
| 90 | RB | Ali Abdulla | 5 August 2002 (age 23) | 1.85 m | 15 | 35 | (Bahrain) Al Tadamun Club |
| 91 | LW | Ali Al-Asheeri | 13 April 2002 (age 24) | 1.80 m | 15 | 30 | (Bahrain) Al Dair Sports Club |
| 93 | RB | Mohamed Habib | 20 July 1993 (age 33) | 1.86 m | 203 | 126 | (Bahrain) Al-Najma |
| 95 | CB | Mohamed Habib Naser | 7 February 2001 (age 25) | 1.79 m | 76 | 144 | (Bahrain) Al-Najma |
| 97 | GK | Mohamed Ali | 12 August 1989 (age 36) | 1.90 m | 240 | 15 | (Bahrain) Al-Najma |
