= Japan men's national handball team =

Japan

Information
- Nickname: 彗星JAPAN
- Association: Japan Handball Association
- Coach: Toni Gerona
- Assistant coach: Yosuke Kakazu; Pau Lleixa; Dimitrije Pejanović

Colours
1st	2nd

Results

Summer Olympics
- Appearances: 6 (First in 1972)
- Best result: 9th (1976)

World Championship
- Appearances: 17 (First in 1961)
- Best result: 10th (1970)

Asian Championship
- Appearances: 21 (First in 1977)
- Best result: (gold) 1st (1977, 1979)
- Last updated on Unknown.

The Japan national handball team is the national handball team of Japan and is controlled by the Japan Handball Association.

== Results ==
=== Summer Olympics ===
- 1972 – 11th place
- 1976 – 9th place
- 1984 – 10th place
- 1988 – 11th place
- 2020 – 11th place
- 2024 – 11th place

=== World Championship ===
- 1961 – 12th place
- 1964 – 16th place
- 1967 – 11th place
- 1970 – 10th place
- 1974 – 12th place
- 1978 – 12th place
- 1982 – 14th place
- 1990 – 15th place
- 1995 – 23rd place
- 1997 – 15th place
- 2005 – 16th place
- 2011 – 16th place
- 2017 – 22nd place
- 2019 – 24th place
- 2021 – 18th place
- 2025 – 28th place
- 2027 – Qualified

=== Asian Championship ===
- 1977 – 1st place
- 1979 – 1st place
- 1983 – 2nd place
- 1987 – 2nd place
- 1989 – 2nd place
- 1991 – 2nd place
- 1993 – 3rd place
- 1995 – 4th place
- 2000 – 3rd place
- 2002 – 6th place
- 2004 – 2nd place
- 2006 – 5th place
- 2008 – 6th place
- 2010 – 3rd place
- 2012 – 4th place
- 2014 – 9th place
- 2016 – 3rd place
- 2018 – 6th place
- 2020 – 3rd place
- 2022 – Withdrawn
- 2024 – 2nd place
- 2026 – 4th place

== Current squad ==
Roster for the 2025 World Men's Handball Championship.

Head coach: (Spain) Toni Gerona

No.	Pos.	Name	Date of birth (age)	Height	App.	Goals	Club
1	GK	Takumi Nakamura	2 August 1996 (age 30)	1.90 m	43	1	(Japan) Toyoda Gosei Blue Falcon
9	LW	Naoki Sugioka	18 April 1994 (age 32)	1.77 m	74	145	(Japan) Toyota Auto Body Brave Kings
11	RB	Tsubasa Nakamura	15 October 1999 (age 26)	1.80 m	4	3	(Japan) Zeekstar Tokyo
19	RB	Shinnosuke Tokuda	6 December 1995 (age 30)	1.78 m	101	312	(Qatar) Al Duhail
21	GK	Daisuke Okamoto	29 March 1995 (age 31)	1.91 m	16	0	(Japan) Toyota Auto Body Brave Kings
24	CB	Asumi Kitazume	22 October 1996 (age 29)	1.86 m	28	25	(Japan) Toyota Auto Body Brave Kings
26	LW	Seito Yano	15 May 1999 (age 27)	1.87 m	2	2	(Japan) Toyoda Gosei Blue Falcon
27	P	Hiroyasu Tamakawa	27 April 1995 (age 31)	2.00 m	95	89	(Japan) Zeekstar Tokyo
31	LB	Tatsuki Yoshino	13 July 1994 (age 32)	1.83 m	82	276	(Japan) Toyota Auto Body Brave Kings
38	LB	Kotaro Mizumachi	13 March 1995 (age 31)	1.83 m	22	40	(Japan) Toyoda Gosei Blue Falcon
39	CB	Naoki Fujisaka	1 July 2002 (age 24)	1.80 m	7	31	(Japan) Nippon Sport Science Univ.
51	RW	Kota Nakata	7 July 1999 (age 27)	1.69 m	2	9	(Japan) Toyota Boshoku Kyushu Red Tornado Saga
56	RB	Ren Arase	6 November 2002 (age 23)	1.74 m	0	0	(Japan) Osaka Sport Science Univ.
57	P	Nikita Nakaoki	24 June 2004 (age 22)	1.92 m	0	0	(Japan) Nippon Sport Science Univ.
64	GK	Go Kawashima	13 March 2001 (age 25)	1.88 m	2	0	Toyota Motor East Japan Regarosso Miyagi
67	RB	Shu Ishimine	12 November 2000 (age 25)	1.81 m	2	2	(Japan) Toyoda Gosei Blue Falcon
68	P	Soya Ichihara	24 August 1999 (age 26)	1.89 m	2	1	(Japan) Toyoda Gosei Blue Falcon
70	LB	Naoki Yamaguchi	25 September 2000 (age 25)	1.88 m	0	0	(Japan) Toyota Boshoku Kyushu Red Tornado Saga
