= Palestine men's national handball team =

Palestine

Information
- Association: Palestinian Handball Association

Colours
1st	2nd

Results

Asian Championship
- Appearances: 3 (First in 1977)
- Best result: 4th (1979)
- Last updated on Unknown.

The Palestine national handball team is the national handball team of Palestine.

== Tournament history ==
=== Asian Championship ===
- 1977 – 7th place
- 1979 – 4th place
- 1987 – 10th place
