= Mohammed Al-Abbas =

Saudi Arabian handball player

Personal information
- Nationality: Saudi Arabian
- Born: 19 December 1992 (age 33)
- Height: 1.70 m (5 ft 7 in)

Sport
- Sport: Handball
- Position: Centre back
- Current club: Mudhar
- Number: 77
National team
Years	Team	Apps	(Gls)
–	Saudi Arabia	88	(183)
Medal record
Asian Championship
Bronze medal – third place	2022 Saudi Arabia

Mohammed Al-Abbas (Arabic: محمد آل عباس; born 19 December 1992) is a Saudi Arabian handball player for Mudhar and the Saudi Arabian national team.
