= Mojtaba Al-Salem =

Saudi Arabian handball player

Personal information
- Nationality: Saudi Arabian
- Born: 15 June 1994 (age 32)
- Height: 1.81 m (5 ft 11 in)

Sport
- Sport: Handball
- Position: Centre back
- Current club: Al-Khaleej Club
- Number: 57
National team
Years	Team	Apps	(Gls)
–	Saudi Arabia	50	(159)
Medal record
Asian Championship
Bronze medal – third place	2022 Saudi Arabia

Mojtaba Al-Salem (Arabic: مجتبى السالم; born 15 June 1994) is a Saudi Arabian handball player for Al-Noor Club and the Saudi Arabian national team.

With Khaleej Club, he finished top scorer at the 2024 IHF Men's Club World Championship.
