= 1977 Asian Men's Handball Championship =

1977 Asian Championship
Tournament details
- Host country: Kuwait
- Venue: 1 (in 1 host city)
- Dates: 26 March – 4 April
- Teams: 9 (from 1 confederation)

Final positions
- Champions: Japan (1st title)
- Runners-up: South Korea
- Third place: China
- Fourth place: Kuwait

The 1977 Asian Men's Handball Championship was the first Asian Championship, which took place from 26 March 4 April 1977 in Kuwait City, Kuwait. The games were played outside at the Al-Sadiq school station. The IHF was represented by president Paul Högberg, general secretary Max Rinkenurger and the Asian representative Kazumi Watanabe.

== Preliminary round ==
=== Group A ===
Pos	Team	Pld	W	D	L	GF	GA	GD	Pts	Qualification
1	Japan	4	4	0	0	121	53	+68	8	Semifinals
2	Kuwait (H)	4	3	0	1	83	66	+17	6	Semifinals
3	Palestine	4	2	0	2	82	83	−1	4	
4	Saudi Arabia	4	1	0	3	63	90	−27	2	
5	United Arab Emirates	4	0	0	4	53	110	−57	0	

(H) Hosts

Games from Japan:

1977	Kuwait	20-11	Saudi Arabia	Kuwait City
1977		(6-4)		Kuwait City

27 March 1977	Japan	27-13	Saudi Arabia	Kuwait City
27 March 1977	Fujinaka & Yuki Saito (5)	(15-5)		Kuwait City

1977	United Arab Emirates	14-30	Palestine	Kuwait City
1977		(7-14)		Kuwait City

1977	Kuwait	30-11	United Arab Emirates	Kuwait City
1977		(16-5)		Kuwait City

1977	Palestine	Cancelled at 11-11	Saudi Arabia	Kuwait City

- At the score of 11-11 it began to rain and it was unplayable.

1977	Kuwait	16-14	Palestine	Kuwait City
1977		(7-3)		Kuwait City

1977	Palestine	26-14	Saudi Arabia	Kuwait City
1977		(15-5)		Kuwait City

- According to Japan: 25-14

30 March 1977	Japan	25-11	United Arab Emirates	Kuwait City
30 March 1977	Sato Kaname & Gamo 5	(10-6)		Kuwait City

1 April 1977	Kuwait	17-30	Japan	Kuwait City
1 April 1977		(7-14)	Sato Kaname 7	Kuwait City

1977	Saudi Arabia	25-17	United Arab Emirates	Kuwait City
1977		(8-5)		Kuwait City

2 April 1977	Japan	39-12	Palestine	Kuwait City
2 April 1977	Gamo 9	(15-6)		Kuwait City

=== Group B ===
Pos	Team	Pld	W	D	L	GF	GA	GD	Pts	Qualification
1	South Korea	3	3	0	0	81	52	+29	6	Semifinals
2	China	3	2	0	1	69	52	+17	4	Semifinals
3	Iraq	3	1	0	2	47	63	−16	2	
4	Bahrain	3	0	0	3	47	77	−30	0	

1977	Bahrain	19-28	China	Kuwait City
1977		(19-28)		Kuwait City

1977	Iraq	18-28	South Korea	Kuwait City
1977		(11-17)		Kuwait City

1977	South Korea	33-15	Bahrain	Kuwait City
1977		(5-17)		Kuwait City

31 March 1977; 10:30	China	19-20	South Korea	Kuwait City
31 March 1977; 10:30		(9-10)		Kuwait City

1977	Bahrain	13-16	Iraq	Kuwait City
1977		(6-7)		Kuwait City

1977	China	22-13	Iraq	Kuwait City
1977		(12-9)		Kuwait City

== Final round ==
Semi-finals
A1 Japan	26
B2 China	19
B1 South Korea	22
A2 Kuwait	16

Final
A1 Japan	24
B1 South Korea	14
Third place
A2 China	38
B2 Kuwait	16

=== Semifinals ===
3 April 1977; 13:00	Japan	26–19	China	Kuwait City; Referees: Abdallah al-Sar & Sanef al-Majideh (KUW)
3 April 1977; 13:00	Sato Kaname (6)	(15-8)		Kuwait City; Referees: Abdallah al-Sar & Sanef al-Majideh (KUW)

4 April 1977	South Korea	22–16	Kuwait	Kuwait City
4 April 1977		(11-8)		Kuwait City

- According to Japan: 21-16

=== Bronze medal match ===
4 April 1977	China	38–25	Kuwait	Kuwait City
4 April 1977		(16-12)		Kuwait City

=== Gold medal match ===
4 April 1977; 13:00	Japan	24–14	South Korea	Kuwait City; Referees: Rajab Mayyov & Hadi al-Mahdi
4 April 1977; 13:00	3 players each 4	(13-6)		Kuwait City; Referees: Rajab Mayyov & Hadi al-Mahdi

== Final standing ==
Rank	Team
1st place, gold medalist(s)	Japan
2nd place, silver medalist(s)	South Korea
3rd place, bronze medalist(s)	China
4	Kuwait
5	Iraq
6	Bahrain
7	Palestine
8	Saudi Arabia
9	United Arab Emirates

Team qualified for the 1978 World Championship

== Top goalscorers ==
Rank	Name	Nationality	Goals
1	Kin Hyakku	China	31
2	Yoji Sato	Japan	30
3	Chung Hyung-kyun	South Korea	28
4	Graeme	Kuwait	25
5	Haruaki Gamo	Japan	23
5	Kim Sung Heon	South Korea	23
