= Amro Mohammed =

Saudi Arabian handball player

Personal information
- Nationality: Saudi Arabian
- Born: 28 June 1989 (age 37)
- Height: 1.87 m (6 ft 2 in)

Sport
- Sport: Handball
- Position: Goalkeeper
- Current club: Al-Ahli
- Number: 16
National team
Years	Team	Apps	(Gls)
2019–	Saudi Arabia	60	(0)
- Updated on 12 January 2023

Amro Mohammed (Arabic: عمرو محمد; born 28 June 1989) is a Saudi handball player for Al-Ahli and the Saudi Arabian national team.

He represented Saudi Arabia at the 2019 World Men's Handball Championship.
