= 2006 Asian Men's Handball Championship =

Season of Asia championship for men handball

2006 Asian Championship
Tournament details
- Host country: Thailand
- Venue(s): 1 (in 1 host city)
- Dates: 12–21 February
- Teams: 9 (from 1 confederation)

Final positions
- Champions: Kuwait (4th title)
- Runner-up: South Korea
- Third place: Qatar
- Fourth place: Iran

Tournament statistics
- Matches played: 22
- Goals scored: 1,265 (57.5 per match)

The 2006 Asian Men's Handball Championship was the twelfth Asian Championship and was held in Bangkok, Thailand from 12 to 21 February 2006. It acted as the Asian qualifying tournament for the 2007 World Men's Handball Championship in Germany.

== Draw ==
Group A	Group B
Kuwait; Thailand; Bahrain; Jordan; South Korea	Japan; Qatar; ~~Saudi Arabia~~ * Iran; China

* Withdrew

== Preliminary round ==
All times are local (UTC+7).

=== Group A ===
Team	Pld	W	D	L	GF	GA	GD	Pts
Kuwait	4	4	0	0	141	101	+40	8
South Korea	4	3	0	1	150	107	+43	6
Bahrain	4	2	0	2	128	117	+11	4
Jordan	4	1	0	3	130	119	+11	2
Thailand (H)	4	0	0	4	81	186	−105	0

(H) Hosts

12 February 2006; 14:00	Kuwait	32–30	Bahrain	Nimibutr Stadium, Bangkok
12 February 2006; 14:00		(14–16)		Nimibutr Stadium, Bangkok

12 February 2006; 18:30	Thailand	26–45	Jordan	Nimibutr Stadium, Bangkok
12 February 2006; 18:30		(10–24)		Nimibutr Stadium, Bangkok

13 February 2006; 14:00	Bahrain	31–40	South Korea	Nimibutr Stadium, Bangkok
13 February 2006; 14:00		(14–16)		Nimibutr Stadium, Bangkok

13 February 2006; 16:00	Kuwait	28–25	Jordan	Nimibutr Stadium, Bangkok
13 February 2006; 16:00		(15–13)		Nimibutr Stadium, Bangkok

14 February 2006; 16:00	Thailand	15–47	South Korea	Nimibutr Stadium, Bangkok
14 February 2006; 16:00		(5–26)		Nimibutr Stadium, Bangkok

15 February 2006; 14:00	Bahrain	27–26	Jordan	Nimibutr Stadium, Bangkok
15 February 2006; 14:00		(13–14)		Nimibutr Stadium, Bangkok

15 February 2006; 16:00	Kuwait	27–25	South Korea	Nimibutr Stadium, Bangkok
15 February 2006; 16:00		(16–14)		Nimibutr Stadium, Bangkok

16 February 2006; 16:00	Thailand	19–40	Bahrain	Nimibutr Stadium, Bangkok

16 February 2006; 18:00	Jordan	34–38	South Korea	Nimibutr Stadium, Bangkok
16 February 2006; 18:00		(19–19)		Nimibutr Stadium, Bangkok

17 February 2006; 16:00	Kuwait	54–21	Thailand	Nimibutr Stadium, Bangkok
17 February 2006; 16:00		(26–7)		Nimibutr Stadium, Bangkok

=== Group B ===
Team	Pld	W	D	L	GF	GA	GD	Pts
Qatar	3	3	0	0	83	64	+19	6
Iran	3	2	0	1	79	61	+18	4
Japan	3	1	0	2	93	82	+11	2
China	3	0	0	3	49	97	−48	0

12 February 2006; 16:00	Japan	25–28	Iran	Nimibutr Stadium, Bangkok
12 February 2006; 16:00		(11–12)		Nimibutr Stadium, Bangkok

13 February 2006; 18:00	Qatar	21–20	Iran	Nimibutr Stadium, Bangkok
13 February 2006; 18:00		(16–10)		Nimibutr Stadium, Bangkok

14 February 2006; 18:00	Qatar	28–14	China	Nimibutr Stadium, Bangkok
14 February 2006; 18:00		(13–6)		Nimibutr Stadium, Bangkok

15 February 2006; 18:00	Japan	38–20	China	Nimibutr Stadium, Bangkok
15 February 2006; 18:00		(19–12)		Nimibutr Stadium, Bangkok

17 February 2006; 14:00	Japan	30–34	Qatar	Nimibutr Stadium, Bangkok
17 February 2006; 14:00		(20–15)		Nimibutr Stadium, Bangkok

17 February 2006; 18:00	Iran	31–15	China	Nimibutr Stadium, Bangkok
17 February 2006; 18:00		(17–6)		Nimibutr Stadium, Bangkok

== Placement 5th–8th ==
=== 7th/8th ===
20 February 2006; 16:00	Jordan	28–25	China	Nimibutr Stadium, Bangkok
20 February 2006; 16:00		(12–11)		Nimibutr Stadium, Bangkok

=== 5th/6th ===
20 February 2006; 18:00	Bahrain	32–37	Japan	Nimibutr Stadium, Bangkok
20 February 2006; 18:00		(16–18)		Nimibutr Stadium, Bangkok

== Final round ==
Semifinals
19 February – Bangkok
Kuwait	27
Iran	23
19 February – Bangkok
Qatar	26
South Korea	29

Gold medal match
21 February – Bangkok
Kuwait	33
South Korea	30
Bronze medal match
21 February – Bangkok
Iran	20
Qatar	21

=== Semifinals ===
19 February 2006; 16:00	Kuwait	27–23	Iran	Nimibutr Stadium, Bangkok
19 February 2006; 16:00		(16–13)		Nimibutr Stadium, Bangkok

19 February 2006; 18:00	Qatar	26–29	South Korea	Nimibutr Stadium, Bangkok
19 February 2006; 18:00		(10–13)		Nimibutr Stadium, Bangkok

=== Bronze medal match ===
21 February 2006; 14:30	Iran	20–21	Qatar	Nimibutr Stadium, Bangkok
21 February 2006; 14:30		(10–10)		Nimibutr Stadium, Bangkok

=== Gold medal match ===
21 February 2006; 17:00	Kuwait	33–30	South Korea	Nimibutr Stadium, Bangkok
21 February 2006; 17:00		(16–14)		Nimibutr Stadium, Bangkok

== Final standing ==
Rank	Team
1st place, gold medalist(s)	Kuwait
2nd place, silver medalist(s)	South Korea
3rd place, bronze medalist(s)	Qatar
4	Iran
5	Japan
6	Bahrain
7	Jordan
8	China
9	Thailand

Team qualified for the 2007 World Championship
