= Seimei Gamo =

Japanese handball player (born 1954)

Seimei Gamo (蒲生 晴明, Gamō Seimei; born 5 April 1954) is a Japanese former handball player who competed in the 1976 Summer Olympics and in the 1984 Summer Olympics.
