= Ali Al-Saffar =

Saudi Arabian handball player

Personal information
- Nationality: Saudi Arabian
- Born: 9 February 1995 (age 31)
- Height: 1.85 m (6 ft 1 in)

Sport
- Sport: Handball
- Position: Goalkeeper
- Current club: Mudhar
- Number: 34
National team
Years	Team	Apps	(Gls)
–	Saudi Arabia	14	(0)
- Updated on 12 January 2023

Ali Al-Saffar (Arabic: علي الصفار; born 9 February 1995) is a Saudi Arabian handball player for Mudhar and the Saudi Arabian national team.
