= 1983 Asian Men's Handball Championship =

1983 Asian Championship
Tournament details
- Host country: South Korea
- Venue(s): 1 (in 1 host city)
- Dates: 25 September – 1 October
- Teams: 8 (from 1 confederation)

Final positions
- Champions: South Korea (1st title)
- Runner-up: Japan
- Third place: Kuwait
- Fourth place: Bahrain

Tournament statistics
- Matches played: 18

The 1983 Asian Men's Handball Championship was the third Asian Championship, which was taking place from 25 September to 1 October 1983 in Seoul, South Korea.

== Preliminary round ==
=== Group A ===
Team	Pld	W	D	L	GF	GA	GD	Pts
South Korea (H)	3	3	0	0	122	54	+68	6
Kuwait	3	2	0	1	102	70	+32	4
Saudi Arabia	3	1	0	2	91	64	+27	2
Hong Kong	3	0	0	3	29	156	−127	0

(H) Hosts

25 September 1983	Hong Kong	15–54	Kuwait	Seoul

25 September 1983	South Korea	35–21	Saudi Arabia	Seoul

Kuwait	21–18	Saudi Arabia	Seoul

South Korea	50–6	Hong Kong	Seoul

Saudi Arabia	52–8	Hong Kong	Seoul

Kuwait	27–37	South Korea	Seoul

=== Group B ===
Team	Pld	W	D	L	GF	GA	GD	Pts
Japan	3	3	0	0	96	41	+55	6
Bahrain	3	2	0	1	69	68	+1	4
Qatar	3	1	0	2	52	65	−13	2
Jordan	3	0	0	3	50	93	−43	0

Japan	37–8	Jordan	Seoul

25 September 1983	Qatar	14–18	Bahrain	Seoul

Japan	28–17	Qatar	Seoul

Jordan	23–35	Bahrain	Seoul

Qatar	21–19	Jordan	Seoul

29 September 1983	Bahrain	16–31	Japan	Seoul

== Final round ==
Semifinals
29 September – Seoul
South Korea	25
Bahrain	22
29 September – Seoul
Japan	26
Kuwait	22

Gold medal match
1 October – Seoul
South Korea	25
Japan	19
Bronze medal match
1 October – Seoul
Bahrain	21
Kuwait	31

=== Semifinals ===
29 September 1983	South Korea	25–22	Bahrain	Seoul

29 September 1983	Japan	26–22	Kuwait	Seoul

=== Bronze medal match ===
1 October 1983	Bahrain	21–31	Kuwait	Seoul

=== Gold medal match ===
1 October 1983	South Korea	25–19	Japan	Seoul

== Final standing ==
Rank	Team
1st place, gold medalist(s)	South Korea
2nd place, silver medalist(s)	Japan
3rd place, bronze medalist(s)	Kuwait
4	Bahrain
5	Saudi Arabia
6	Qatar
7	Jordan
8	Hong Kong
