= 2008 Asian Men's Handball Championship =

2008 Asian Championship

Tournament details
- Host country: Iran
- Venue: 1 (in 1 host city)
- Dates: 17–26 February
- Teams: 10 (from 1 confederation)

Final positions
- Champions: South Korea (7th title)
- Runners-up: Kuwait
- Third place: Saudi Arabia
- Fourth place: Iran

Tournament statistics
- Matches played: 27
- Goals scored: 1,563 (57.89 per match)

The 2008 Asian Men's Handball Championship was the 13th Asian Championship, which was taking place from 17 to 26 February 2008 in Isfahan, Iran. The championship was held in Isfahan's Pirouzi Arena and acted as the Asian qualifying tournament for the 2009 World Men's Handball Championship in Croatia.

== Draw ==
Group A	Group B
Kuwait; Iran; Bahrain; China; Lebanon	South Korea; Qatar; Japan; United Arab Emirates; Saudi Arabia

== Preliminary round ==
All times are local (UTC+3:30).

=== Group A ===
Team	Pld	W	D	L	GF	GA	GD	Pts
Kuwait	4	3	0	1	122	109	+13	6
Iran (H)	4	3	0	1	137	122	+15	6
Bahrain	4	3	0	1	129	113	+16	6
China	4	1	0	3	113	131	−18	2
Lebanon	4	0	0	4	102	128	−26	0

(H) Hosts

17 February 2008; 16:00	Iran	36–28	China	Pirouzi Arena, Isfahan; Referees: Chernega, Poladenko (RUS)
17 February 2008; 16:00		(19–15)		Pirouzi Arena, Isfahan; Referees: Chernega, Poladenko (RUS)

17 February 2008; 20:00	Kuwait	26–24	Bahrain	Pirouzi Arena, Isfahan; Referees: Kolahdouzan, Karbaschi (IRI)
17 February 2008; 20:00		(12–8)		Pirouzi Arena, Isfahan; Referees: Kolahdouzan, Karbaschi (IRI)

18 February 2008; 16:00	Bahrain	37–26	Lebanon	Pirouzi Arena, Isfahan; Referees: Qasqas, Bani Hani (JOR)
18 February 2008; 16:00		(18–11)		Pirouzi Arena, Isfahan; Referees: Qasqas, Bani Hani (JOR)

18 February 2008; 20:00	Kuwait	33–28	China	Pirouzi Arena, Isfahan; Referees: Vakula, Ludovik (UKR)
18 February 2008; 20:00		(20–8)		Pirouzi Arena, Isfahan; Referees: Vakula, Ludovik (UKR)

19 February 2008; 16:00	Iran	34–27	Lebanon	Pirouzi Arena, Isfahan; Referees: Lu, Chen (CHN)
19 February 2008; 16:00		(16–15)		Pirouzi Arena, Isfahan; Referees: Lu, Chen (CHN)

20 February 2008; 14:30	Kuwait	29–22	Lebanon	Pirouzi Arena, Isfahan; Referees: Jonid, Honish (SYR)
20 February 2008; 14:30		(14–12)		Pirouzi Arena, Isfahan; Referees: Jonid, Honish (SYR)

20 February 2008; 18:30	Bahrain	35–29	China	Pirouzi Arena, Isfahan; Referees: Chernega, Poladenko (RUS)
20 February 2008; 18:30		(17–15)		Pirouzi Arena, Isfahan; Referees: Chernega, Poladenko (RUS)

21 February 2008; 16:00	Iran	32–33	Bahrain	Pirouzi Arena, Isfahan; Referees: Vakula, Ludovik (UKR)
21 February 2008; 16:00		(20–12)		Pirouzi Arena, Isfahan; Referees: Vakula, Ludovik (UKR)

22 February 2008; 16:30	China	28–27	Lebanon	Pirouzi Arena, Isfahan; Referees: Jonid, Honish (SYR)
22 February 2008; 16:30		(16–14)		Pirouzi Arena, Isfahan; Referees: Jonid, Honish (SYR)

22 February 2008; 20:30	Kuwait	34–35	Iran	Pirouzi Arena, Isfahan; Referees: Chernega, Poladenko (RUS)
22 February 2008; 20:30		(18–15)		Pirouzi Arena, Isfahan; Referees: Chernega, Poladenko (RUS)

=== Group B ===
Team	Pld	W	D	L	GF	GA	GD	Pts
South Korea	4	4	0	0	131	105	+26	8
Saudi Arabia	4	2	1	1	120	113	+7	5
Qatar	4	2	0	2	113	122	−9	4
Japan	4	1	1	2	128	120	+8	3
United Arab Emirates	4	0	0	4	109	141	−32	0

17 February 2008; 18:00	South Korea	36–27	United Arab Emirates	Pirouzi Arena, Isfahan; Referees: Lu, Chen (CHN)
17 February 2008; 18:00		(20–10)		Pirouzi Arena, Isfahan; Referees: Lu, Chen (CHN)

17 February 2008; 22:00	Japan	28–28	Saudi Arabia	Pirouzi Arena, Isfahan; Referees: Vakula, Ludovik (UKR)
17 February 2008; 22:00		(13–14)		Pirouzi Arena, Isfahan; Referees: Vakula, Ludovik (UKR)

18 February 2008; 18:00	Qatar	30–29	United Arab Emirates	Pirouzi Arena, Isfahan; Referees: Jonid, Honish (SYR)
18 February 2008; 18:00		(12–14)		Pirouzi Arena, Isfahan; Referees: Jonid, Honish (SYR)

18 February 2008; 22:00	South Korea	33–25	Japan	Pirouzi Arena, Isfahan; Referees: Chernega, Poladenko (RUS)
18 February 2008; 22:00		(18–12)		Pirouzi Arena, Isfahan; Referees: Chernega, Poladenko (RUS)

19 February 2008; 18:00	Qatar	28–31	Saudi Arabia	Pirouzi Arena, Isfahan; Referees: Kolahdouzan, Karbaschi (IRI)
19 February 2008; 18:00		(12–17)		Pirouzi Arena, Isfahan; Referees: Kolahdouzan, Karbaschi (IRI)

20 February 2008; 16:30	South Korea	31–30	Saudi Arabia	Pirouzi Arena, Isfahan; Referees: Vakula, Ludovik (UKR)
20 February 2008; 16:30		(17–15)		Pirouzi Arena, Isfahan; Referees: Vakula, Ludovik (UKR)

20 February 2008; 20:30	Japan	44–27	United Arab Emirates	Pirouzi Arena, Isfahan; Referees: Dib, Haidar (LIB)
20 February 2008; 20:30		(21–17)		Pirouzi Arena, Isfahan; Referees: Dib, Haidar (LIB)

21 February 2008; 18:00	Qatar	32–31	Japan	Pirouzi Arena, Isfahan; Referees: Dib, Haidar (LIB)
21 February 2008; 18:00		(11–17)		Pirouzi Arena, Isfahan; Referees: Dib, Haidar (LIB)

22 February 2008; 14:30	United Arab Emirates	26–31	Saudi Arabia	Pirouzi Arena, Isfahan; Referees: Qasqas, Bani Hani (JOR)
22 February 2008; 14:30		(13–17)		Pirouzi Arena, Isfahan; Referees: Qasqas, Bani Hani (JOR)

22 February 2008; 18:30	South Korea	31–23	Qatar	Pirouzi Arena, Isfahan; Referees: Kolahdouzan, Karbaschi (IRI)
22 February 2008; 18:30		(14–9)		Pirouzi Arena, Isfahan; Referees: Kolahdouzan, Karbaschi (IRI)

== Placement 5th–10th ==
=== 9th/10th ===
24 February 2008; 14:00	Lebanon	25–38	United Arab Emirates	Pirouzi Arena, Isfahan; Referees: Lu, Chen (CHN)
24 February 2008; 14:00		(13–18)		Pirouzi Arena, Isfahan; Referees: Lu, Chen (CHN)

=== 7th/8th ===
25 February 2008; 14:30	China	35–38	Japan	Pirouzi Arena, Isfahan; Referees: Jonid, Honish (SYR)
25 February 2008; 14:30		(15–22)		Pirouzi Arena, Isfahan; Referees: Jonid, Honish (SYR)

=== 5th/6th ===
25 February 2008; 17:00	Bahrain	0–10	Qatar	Pirouzi Arena, Isfahan; Referees: Kolahdouzan, Karbaschi (IRI)
25 February 2008; 17:00		(Walkover)		Pirouzi Arena, Isfahan; Referees: Kolahdouzan, Karbaschi (IRI)

* Bahrain didn't not show up and was penalized to the last place.

== Final round ==
Semifinals
24 February – Isfahan
Kuwait	32
Saudi Arabia	29
24 February – Isfahan
South Korea	33
Iran	24

Gold medal match
26 February – Isfahan
Kuwait	21
South Korea	27
Bronze medal match
26 February – Isfahan
Saudi Arabia	24
Iran	23

=== Semifinals ===
24 February 2008; 16:30	Kuwait	32–29	Saudi Arabia	Pirouzi Arena, Isfahan; Referees: Vakula, Ludovik (UKR)
24 February 2008; 16:30		(16–14)		Pirouzi Arena, Isfahan; Referees: Vakula, Ludovik (UKR)

24 February 2008; 19:00	South Korea	33–24	Iran	Pirouzi Arena, Isfahan; Referees: Chernega, Poladenko (RUS)
24 February 2008; 19:00		(13–12)		Pirouzi Arena, Isfahan; Referees: Chernega, Poladenko (RUS)

=== Bronze medal match ===
26 February 2008; 14:30	Saudi Arabia	24–23	Iran	Pirouzi Arena, Isfahan; Referees: Vakula, Ludovik (UKR)
26 February 2008; 14:30		(13–12)		Pirouzi Arena, Isfahan; Referees: Vakula, Ludovik (UKR)

=== Gold medal match ===
26 February 2008; 17:00	Kuwait	21–27	South Korea	Pirouzi Arena, Isfahan; Referees: Chernega, Poladenko (RUS)
26 February 2008; 17:00		(9–15)		Pirouzi Arena, Isfahan; Referees: Chernega, Poladenko (RUS)

== Final standing ==
Rank	Team
1st place, gold medalist(s)	South Korea
2nd place, silver medalist(s)	Kuwait
3rd place, bronze medalist(s)	Saudi Arabia
4	Iran
5	Qatar
6	Japan
7	China
8	United Arab Emirates
9	Lebanon
10	Bahrain

Team qualified for the 2009 World Championship

== All-star team ==
- Goalkeeper: Yousef Al-Fadhli (KUW)
- Left wing: Yu Dong-geun (KOR)
- Left back: Rahim Momenizadeh (IRI)
- Pivot: Abdullah Al-Theyab (KUW)
- Centre back: Bandar Al-Harbi (KSA)
- Right back: Park Wong-chul (KOR)
- Right wing: Hussain Al-Ekhwan (KSA)
