= 2004 Asian Men's Handball Championship =

Season of the Asian Men's Handball Championship

2004 Asian Championship
Tournament details
- Host country: Qatar
- Venue(s): 1 (in 1 host city)
- Dates: 12–21 February
- Teams: 9 (from 1 confederation)

Final positions
- Champions: Kuwait (3rd title)
- Runner-up: Japan
- Third place: Qatar
- Fourth place: Bahrain

Tournament statistics
- Matches played: 22
- Goals scored: 1,128 (51.27 per match)

The 2004 Asian Men's Handball Championship was the eleventh Asian Championship and was held in Doha, Qatar from 12 to 21 February 2004.

== Draw ==
Group A	Group B
Kuwait; Iran; Japan; United Arab Emirates; Oman	Saudi Arabia; Qatar; Bahrain; Jordan

South Korea probably withdrew.

== Preliminary round ==
All times are local (UTC+3).

=== Group A ===
Team	Pld	W	D	L	GF	GA	GD	Pts
Kuwait	4	4	0	0	130	93	+37	8
Japan	4	3	0	1	113	91	+22	6
United Arab Emirates	4	2	0	2	106	107	−1	4
Iran	4	1	0	3	103	111	−8	2
Oman	4	0	0	4	80	130	−50	0

12 February 2004; 16:30	Iran	22–28	United Arab Emirates	Khalifa Arena, Doha
12 February 2004; 16:30		(11–14)		Khalifa Arena, Doha

12 February 2004; 19:30	Kuwait	26–23	Japan	Khalifa Arena, Doha
12 February 2004; 19:30		(16–10)		Khalifa Arena, Doha

13 February 2004; 19:00	Japan	27–21	Oman	Khalifa Arena, Doha
13 February 2004; 19:00		(15–11)		Khalifa Arena, Doha

14 February 2004; 18:00	Kuwait	30–24	United Arab Emirates	Khalifa Arena, Doha
14 February 2004; 18:00		(14–10)		Khalifa Arena, Doha

14 February 2004; 19:30	Iran	33–20	Oman	Khalifa Arena, Doha

15 February 2004; 19:30	Japan	35–23	United Arab Emirates	Khalifa Arena, Doha
15 February 2004; 19:30		(17–12)		Khalifa Arena, Doha

16 February 2004; 16:30	Kuwait	39–19	Oman	Khalifa Arena, Doha

16 February 2004; 18:00	Iran	21–28	Japan	Khalifa Arena, Doha
16 February 2004; 18:00		(9–9)		Khalifa Arena, Doha

17 February 2004; 16:30	United Arab Emirates	31–20	Oman	Khalifa Arena, Doha
17 February 2004; 16:30		(15–9)		Khalifa Arena, Doha

17 February 2004; 19:30	Kuwait	35–27	Iran	Khalifa Arena, Doha
17 February 2004; 19:30		(19–13)		Khalifa Arena, Doha

=== Group B ===
Team	Pld	W	D	L	GF	GA	GD	Pts
Qatar (H)	3	3	0	0	78	64	+14	6
Bahrain	3	2	0	1	72	66	+6	4
Saudi Arabia	3	1	0	2	69	67	+2	2
Jordan	3	0	0	3	63	85	−22	0

(H) Hosts

12 February 2004; 18:00	Qatar	27–19	Jordan	Khalifa Arena, Doha
12 February 2004; 18:00		(13–9)		Khalifa Arena, Doha

13 February 2004; 17:30	Saudi Arabia	18–20	Bahrain	Khalifa Arena, Doha
13 February 2004; 17:30		(7–12)		Khalifa Arena, Doha

14 February 2004; 16:30	Saudi Arabia	30–23	Jordan	Khalifa Arena, Doha

15 February 2004; 17:30	Qatar	27–24	Bahrain	Khalifa Arena, Doha

16 February 2004; 19:30	Saudi Arabia	21–24	Qatar	Khalifa Arena, Doha
16 February 2004; 19:30		(10–11)		Khalifa Arena, Doha

17 February 2004; 18:00	Bahrain	28–21	Jordan	Khalifa Arena, Doha

== Placement 5th–8th ==
=== 7th/8th ===
20 February 2004; 17:30	Iran	28–27	Jordan	Khalifa Arena, Doha

=== 5th/6th ===
20 February 2004; 19:00	United Arab Emirates	25–29	Saudi Arabia	Khalifa Arena, Doha

== Final round ==
Semifinals
19 February – Doha
Kuwait	29
Bahrain	21
19 February – Doha
Qatar	23
Japan	27

Gold medal match
21 February – Doha
Kuwait	28
Japan	24
Bronze medal match
21 February – Doha
Bahrain	26
Qatar	27

=== Semifinals ===
19 February 2004; 17:30	Kuwait	29–21	Bahrain	Khalifa Arena, Doha
19 February 2004; 17:30		(18–10)		Khalifa Arena, Doha

19 February 2004; 19:00	Qatar	23–27	Japan	Khalifa Arena, Doha
19 February 2004; 19:00		(13–15)		Khalifa Arena, Doha

=== Bronze medal match ===
21 February 2004; 17:30	Bahrain	26–27	Qatar	Khalifa Arena, Doha

=== Gold medal match ===
21 February 2004; 19:00	Kuwait	28–24	Japan	Khalifa Arena, Doha
21 February 2004; 19:00		(16–9)		Khalifa Arena, Doha

== Final standing ==
Rank	Team
1st place, gold medalist(s)	Kuwait
2nd place, silver medalist(s)	Japan
3rd place, bronze medalist(s)	Qatar
4	Bahrain
5	Saudi Arabia
6	United Arab Emirates
7	Iran
8	Jordan
9	Oman

Team qualified for the 2005 World Championship
