= 1989 Asian Men's Handball Championship =

1989 Asian Championship
Tournament details
- Host country: China
- Venue(s): 1 (in 1 host city)
- Dates: 18 August – 1 September
- Teams: 9 (from 1 confederation)

Final positions
- Champions: South Korea (3rd title)
- Runners-up: Japan
- Third place: Kuwait
- Fourth place: China

Tournament statistics
- Matches played: 21

The 1989 Asian Men's Handball Championship was the fifth Asian Championship, which was taking place from 18 August to 1 September 1989 in Beijing, China.

== Preliminary round ==
=== Group A ===
Team	Pld	W	D	L	GF	GA	GD	Pts
Japan	2	2	0	0	65	48	+17	4
Qatar	2	1	0	1	65	45	+20	2
Chinese Taipei	2	0	0	2	33	70	−37	0

23 August 1989	Japan	33–20	Chinese Taipei	Beijing

Qatar	37–13	Chinese Taipei	Beijing

Japan	32–28	Qatar	Beijing

=== Group B ===
Team	Pld	W	D	L	GF	GA	GD	Pts
South Korea	2	2	0	0	79	28	+51	4
Saudi Arabia	2	1	0	1	-	-	—	2
Hong Kong	2	0	0	2	-	-	—	0

23 August 1989	Saudi Arabia	–	Hong Kong	Beijing

24 August 1989	Hong Kong	9–47	South Korea	Beijing

25 August 1989	South Korea	32–19	Saudi Arabia	Beijing
25 August 1989		(15–10)		Beijing

=== Group C ===
Team	Pld	W	D	L	GF	GA	GD	Pts
Kuwait	2	2	0	0	76	44	+32	4
China	2	1	0	1	53	57	−4	2
Iran	2	0	0	2	41	69	−28	0

August 1989	Kuwait	32–28	Iran	Beijing

August 1989	China	37–13	Iran	Beijing

August 1989	Kuwait	44–16	China	Beijing
August 1989		(15–10)		Beijing

== Elimination round ==
South Korea	37–30	China	Beijing

Japan	–	Saudi Arabia	Beijing

Kuwait	–	Qatar	Beijing

== Final round ==
=== Placement 7th–9th ===
Team	Pld	W	D	L	GF	GA	GD	Pts
Chinese Taipei	2	2	0	0	76	44	+32	4
Iran	2	1	0	1	65	45	+20	2
Hong Kong	2	0	0	2	29	81	−52	0

Chinese Taipei	32–28	Iran	Beijing

Iran	37–13	Hong Kong	Beijing

Hong Kong	16–44	Chinese Taipei	Beijing

=== Placement 4th–6th ===
Team	Pld	W	D	L	GF	GA	GD	Pts
China	2	2	0	0	58	31	+27	4
Saudi Arabia	2	0	1	1	39	52	−13	1
Qatar	2	0	1	1	36	50	−14	1

China	30–17	Saudi Arabia	Beijing

Saudi Arabia	22–22	Qatar	Beijing

Qatar	14–28	China	Beijing

=== Championship ===
Team	Pld	W	D	L	GF	GA	GD	Pts
South Korea	2	2	0	0	51	45	+6	4
Japan	2	1	0	1	45	37	+8	2
Kuwait	2	0	0	2	39	53	−14	0

South Korea	24–19	Japan	Beijing

Japan	26–13	Kuwait	Beijing

Kuwait	26–27	South Korea	Beijing

== Final standing ==
Rank	Team
1st place, gold medalist(s)	South Korea
2nd place, silver medalist(s)	Japan
3rd place, bronze medalist(s)	Kuwait
4	China
5	Saudi Arabia
6	Qatar
7	Chinese Taipei
8	Iran
9	Hong Kong

Team qualified for the 1990 World Championship
