= 1979 Asian Men's Handball Championship =

Asian championship

1979 Asian Championship
Tournament details
- Host country: China
- Venue(s): 1 (in 1 host city)
- Dates: 4–9 November
- Teams: 5 (from 1 confederation)

Final positions
- Champions: Japan (2nd title)
- Runner-up: China
- Third place: Kuwait
- Fourth place: Palestine

Tournament statistics
- Matches played: 10

The 1979 Asian Men's Handball Championship was the second Asian Championship, which was held from 1 to 11 November 1979, in Nanjing, China. acted as the Asian qualifying tournament for the 1980 Summer Olympics in Moscow.

== Results ==
Team	Pld	W	D	L	GF	GA	GD	Pts
Japan	4	4	0	0	127	56	+71	8
China (H)	4	3	0	1	132	73	+59	6
Kuwait	4	2	0	2	100	77	+23	4
Palestine	4	1	0	3	71	115	−44	2
India	4	0	0	4	55	164	−109	0

Source: Hand-ball : bulletin fédéral n°158
(H) Hosts

4 November 1979	Japan	29–14	Palestine	Nanjing

4 November 1979	Kuwait	41–14	India	Nanjing

5 November 1979	India	8–44	Japan	Nanjing

5 November 1979	Palestine	16–33	China	Nanjing

6 November 1979	China	22–20	Kuwait	Nanjing

6 November 1979	India	23-27	Palestine	Nanjing

8 November 1979	China	52–10	India	Nanjing

8 November 1979	Kuwait	9–27	Japan	Nanjing

9 November 1979	Palestine	14–30	Kuwait	Nanjing

9 November 1979	Japan	27–25	China	Nanjing

== Final standing ==
Japan qualified for Olympic tournament 1980 but refused to play, China apparently too. So Kuwait took their place.

Team qualified for the 1980 Summer Olympics

Rank	Team
1st place, gold medalist(s)	Japan
2nd place, silver medalist(s)	China
3rd place, bronze medalist(s)	Kuwait
4	Palestine
5	India

South Korea probably did not participate, because the tournament was played in China.
