= 1987 Asian Men's Handball Championship =

1987 Asian Championship
Tournament details
- Host country: Jordan
- Venue(s): 1 (in 1 host city)
- Dates: 20–29 August
- Teams: 11 (from 1 confederation)

Final positions
- Champions: South Korea (2nd title)
- Runner-up: Japan
- Third place: Kuwait
- Fourth place: China

The 1987 Asian Men's Handball Championship was the fourth Asian Championship, which was taking place from 20 to 29 August 1987 in Amman, Jordan. The competition is played along with first Women's Championship.

== Preliminary round ==
=== Group A ===
Team	Pld	W	D	L	GF	GA	GD	Pts
South Korea	2	2	0	0	73	47	+26	4
Bahrain	2	1	0	1	47	63	−16	2
Chinese Taipei	2	0	0	2	51	61	−10	0

20 August 1987	South Korea	38–21	Bahrain	Amman

22 August 1987	Chinese Taipei	26–35	South Korea	Amman

23 August 1987	Bahrain	26–25	Chinese Taipei	Amman

=== Group B ===
Team	Pld	W	D	L	GF	GA	GD	Pts
Kuwait	3	3	0	0	98	37	+61	6
Qatar	3	1	1	1	83	60	+23	3
Jordan (H)	3	1	1	1	59	68	−9	3
Nepal	3	0	0	3	31	106	−75	0

(H) Hosts

20 August 1987	Nepal	14–24	Jordan	Amman

21 August 1987	Qatar	19–26	Kuwait	Amman
21 August 1987		(10–11)		Amman

22 August 1987	Kuwait	41–6	Nepal	Amman

22 August 1987	Jordan	23–23	Qatar	Amman

23 August 1987	Qatar	41–11	Nepal	Amman

23 August 1987	Kuwait	31–12	Jordan	Amman

=== Group C ===
Team	Pld	W	D	L	GF	GA	GD	Pts
Japan	3	3	0	0	84	43	+41	6
China	3	2	0	1	79	62	+17	4
Syria	3	1	0	2	60	68	−8	2
Palestine	3	0	0	3	44	94	−50	0

21 August 1987	Palestine	14–24	Syria	Amman
21 August 1987		(3–12)		Amman

21 August 1987	China	12–27	Japan	Amman
21 August 1987		(6–12)		Amman

22 August 1987	China	37–17	Palestine	Amman

22 August 1987	Japan	24–18	Syria	Amman
22 August 1987		(14–9)		Amman

23 August 1987	Japan	33–13	Palestine	Amman
23 August 1987		(16–4)		Amman

23 August 1987	Syria	18–30	China	Amman

== Elimination round ==
25 August 1987	South Korea	38–20	China	Amman

25 August 1987	Kuwait	29–18	Bahrain	Amman

25 August 1987	Japan	35–12	Qatar	Amman
25 August 1987		(12–9)		Amman

== Final round ==
=== Placement 10th–11th ===
27 August 1987	Palestine	32–22	Nepal	Amman
27 August 1987		(18–9)		Amman

=== Placement 7th–9th ===
Team	Pld	W	D	L	GF	GA	GD	Pts
Chinese Taipei	2	2	0	0	70	45	+25	4
Syria	2	1	0	1	42	46	−4	2
Jordan (H)	2	0	0	2	43	64	−21	0

(H) Hosts

25 August 1987	Chinese Taipei	42–25	Jordan	Amman

26 August 1987	Syria	22–18	Jordan	Amman
26 August 1987		(8–11)		Amman

27 August 1987	Chinese Taipei	28–20	Syria	Amman

=== Placement 4th–6th ===
Team	Pld	W	D	L	GF	GA	GD	Pts
China	2	2	0	0	42	25	+17	4
Bahrain	2	1	0	1	27	33	−6	2
Qatar	2	0	0	2	27	38	−11	0

26 August 1987	China	21–10	Bahrain	Amman

27 August 1987	Qatar	15–21	China	Amman

28 August 1987	Bahrain	17–12	Qatar	Amman

=== Championship ===
Team	Pld	W	D	L	GF	GA	GD	Pts
South Korea	2	2	0	0	64	55	+9	4
Japan	2	1	0	1	49	51	−2	2
Kuwait	2	0	0	2	54	61	−7	0

26 August 1987	South Korea	28–24	Japan	Amman
26 August 1987		(11–12)		Amman

27 August 1987	Kuwait	31–36	South Korea	Amman
27 August 1987		(10–20)		Amman

29 August 1987	Japan	25–23	Kuwait	Amman
29 August 1987		(12–12)		Amman

== Final standing ==
Rank	Team
1st place, gold medalist(s)	South Korea
2nd place, silver medalist(s)	Japan
3rd place, bronze medalist(s)	Kuwait
4	China
5	Bahrain
6	Qatar
7	Chinese Taipei
8	Syria
9	Jordan
10	Palestine
11	Nepal

Team qualified for the 1988 Summer Olympics
