= 2000 Asian Men's Handball Championship =

2000 Asian Championship
Tournament details
- Host country: Japan
- Venue(s): 2 (in 1 host city)
- Dates: 25–30 January
- Teams: 5 (from 1 confederation)

Final positions
- Champions: South Korea (6th title)
- Runners-up: China
- Third place: Japan
- Fourth place: Chinese Taipei

Tournament statistics
- Matches played: 10
- Goals scored: 478 (47.8 per match)
- Top scorer(s): (Chinese Taipei) Tan Tsung-sheng (31)

The 2000 Asian Men's Handball Championship was the ninth Asian Championship, which was taking place from 25 30 January 30 2000 in Kumamoto, Japan. It acted as the Asian qualifying tournament for the 2000 Olympic Games.

== Standings ==
Team	Pld	W	D	L	GF	GA	GD	Pts
South Korea	4	4	0	0	129	62	+67	8
China	4	3	0	1	105	99	+6	6
Japan (H)	4	2	0	2	97	75	+22	4
Chinese Taipei	4	1	0	3	86	110	−24	2
Iran	4	0	0	4	61	132	−71	0

(H) Hosts

== Results ==
All times are local (UTC+9).

25 January 2000; 17:00	South Korea	37–12	Chinese Taipei	Kumamoto City Gymnasium, Kumamoto; Referees: Al-Janahi, Al-Rashid (KSA)
25 January 2000; 17:00	Lim S.S. 8	(18–4)	Tan T.S. 5	Kumamoto City Gymnasium, Kumamoto; Referees: Al-Janahi, Al-Rashid (KSA)
25 January 2000; 17:00	2× (yellow card) 1× (suspension)	Report	3× (yellow card) 3× (suspension)	Kumamoto City Gymnasium, Kumamoto; Referees: Al-Janahi, Al-Rashid (KSA)

25 January 2000; 19:00	Iran	18–34	China	Kumamoto City Gymnasium, Kumamoto; Referees: Chung, Lim (KOR)
25 January 2000; 19:00	Nikounejad, Jafarnia 5	(8–18)	Zhang J., Zhu W.X. 8	Kumamoto City Gymnasium, Kumamoto; Referees: Chung, Lim (KOR)
25 January 2000; 19:00	2× (yellow card) 3× (suspension)	Report	2× (yellow card) 4× (suspension)	Kumamoto City Gymnasium, Kumamoto; Referees: Chung, Lim (KOR)

26 January 2000; 17:00	South Korea	38–14	Iran	Kumamoto City Gymnasium, Kumamoto; Referees: Goto, Shimizu (JPN)
26 January 2000; 17:00	Yoon K.S. 6	(17–8)	Nikounejad 3	Kumamoto City Gymnasium, Kumamoto; Referees: Goto, Shimizu (JPN)
26 January 2000; 17:00	2× (yellow card)	Report	2× (yellow card) 2× (suspension)	Kumamoto City Gymnasium, Kumamoto; Referees: Goto, Shimizu (JPN)

26 January 2000; 19:00	Japan	24–18	Chinese Taipei	Kumamoto City Gymnasium, Kumamoto; Referees: Zhang, Zhang (CHN)
26 January 2000; 19:00	Iwamoto 6	(10–9)	Tan T.S. 8	Kumamoto City Gymnasium, Kumamoto; Referees: Zhang, Zhang (CHN)
26 January 2000; 19:00	2× (yellow card) 4× (suspension) 1× (red card)	Report	3× (yellow card) 3× (suspension)	Kumamoto City Gymnasium, Kumamoto; Referees: Zhang, Zhang (CHN)

27 January 2000; 18:00	Japan	20–24	China	Matsubase Town Sports Centre, Kumamoto; Referees: Kalin, Korić (SLO)
27 January 2000; 18:00	Kayaba 5	(11–9)	Zhu W.X., Wang X.D. 6	Matsubase Town Sports Centre, Kumamoto; Referees: Kalin, Korić (SLO)
27 January 2000; 18:00	3× (yellow card) 7× (suspension)	Report	3× (yellow card) 4× (suspension)	Matsubase Town Sports Centre, Kumamoto; Referees: Kalin, Korić (SLO)

28 January 2000; 17:00	Iran	18–27	Chinese Taipei	Kumamoto City Gymnasium, Kumamoto; Referees: Goto, Shimizu (JPN)
28 January 2000; 17:00	Safari 6	(5–12)	Tan T.S. 7	Kumamoto City Gymnasium, Kumamoto; Referees: Goto, Shimizu (JPN)
28 January 2000; 17:00	3× (yellow card) 5× (suspension) 1× (red card)	Report	3× (yellow card) 5× (suspension) 1× (red card)	Kumamoto City Gymnasium, Kumamoto; Referees: Goto, Shimizu (JPN)

28 January 2000; 19:00	South Korea	32–16	China	Kumamoto City Gymnasium, Kumamoto; Referees: Abdullah, Abbas (KUW)
28 January 2000; 19:00	Yoon K.S. 7	(16–3)	Zhu W.X. 7	Kumamoto City Gymnasium, Kumamoto; Referees: Abdullah, Abbas (KUW)
28 January 2000; 19:00	3× (yellow card) 2× (suspension)	Report	2× (yellow card)	Kumamoto City Gymnasium, Kumamoto; Referees: Abdullah, Abbas (KUW)

29 January 2000; 14:00	Japan	33–11	Iran	Kumamoto City Gymnasium, Kumamoto; Referees: Zhang, Zhang (CHN)
29 January 2000; 14:00	Kato, Tsuji 6	(15–3)	Khalaj 3	Kumamoto City Gymnasium, Kumamoto; Referees: Zhang, Zhang (CHN)
29 January 2000; 14:00	2× (yellow card) 1× (suspension)	Report	1× (yellow card) 4× (suspension)	Kumamoto City Gymnasium, Kumamoto; Referees: Zhang, Zhang (CHN)

30 January 2000; 14:00	South Korea	22–20	Japan	Kumamoto City Gymnasium, Kumamoto; Referees: Kalin, Korić (SLO)
30 January 2000; 14:00	Yoon K.S. 11	(13–7)	Sasaki, Tomimoto 5	Kumamoto City Gymnasium, Kumamoto; Referees: Kalin, Korić (SLO)
30 January 2000; 14:00	2× (yellow card) 3× (suspension)	Report	4× (yellow card) 3× (suspension)	Kumamoto City Gymnasium, Kumamoto; Referees: Kalin, Korić (SLO)

30 January 2000; 16:00	Chinese Taipei	29–31	China	Kumamoto City Gymnasium, Kumamoto; Referees: Al-Janahi, Al-Rashid (KSA)
30 January 2000; 16:00	Tan T.S. 11	(15–18)	Zhu W.X. 7	Kumamoto City Gymnasium, Kumamoto; Referees: Al-Janahi, Al-Rashid (KSA)
30 January 2000; 16:00	2× (yellow card) 5× (suspension)	Report	3× (yellow card) 6× (suspension)	Kumamoto City Gymnasium, Kumamoto; Referees: Al-Janahi, Al-Rashid (KSA)

== Final standing ==
Rank	Team
1st place, gold medalist(s)	South Korea
2nd place, silver medalist(s)	China
3rd place, bronze medalist(s)	Japan
4	Chinese Taipei
5	Iran

Team qualified for the 2000 Summer Olympics
