= Asian Men's Handball Championship =

Official competition for senior national handball teams of Asia

AHF Asian Men's Handball Championship
- Current season, competition or edition: 2026 Asian Men's Handball Championship
- Sport: Handball
- Founded: 1976
- First season: 1977
- Administrator: Asian Handball Federation
- Countries: AHF Members
- Headquarters: Kuwait City (Kuwait)
- Continent: AHF (Asia)
- Most recent champion: Bahrain (1st title)
- Most titles: South Korea (9 titles)
- Qualification: World Men's Handball Championship
- Broadcaster: Al-Kass Sports Channel
- Sponsors: SK Group; Molten Corporation; Gerflor
- Level on pyramid: 1
- Related competitions: Asian Women's Handball Championship
- Tournament format: Round-robin, knockout stage
- Website: Website

The Asian Men's Handball Championship is the official competition for senior national handball teams of Asia (since 2018, also includes teams from Oceania), taking place every two years. Organized by the Asian Handball Federation (AHF), it also serves as a qualifying tournament for the World Championship.

== Summary ==
Year	Host	Final			Third place match		
Year	Host	Champion	Score	Runner-up	Third place	Score	Fourth place
1977; Details	Kuwait City	Japan	24–14	South Korea	China	38–16	Kuwait
1979; Details	(China); Nanjing	Japan	No playoffs	China	Kuwait	No playoffs	Palestine
1983; Details	(South Korea); Seoul	South Korea	25–19	Japan	Kuwait	31–21	Bahrain
1987; Details	(Jordan); Amman	South Korea	No playoffs	Japan	Kuwait	No playoffs	South Korea
1989; Details	(China); Beijing	South Korea	No playoffs	Japan	Kuwait	No playoffs	China
1991; Details	(Japan); Hiroshima	South Korea	27–23	Japan	China	29–17	Qatar
1993; Details	(Bahrain); Manama	South Korea	26–22	Kuwait	Japan		Saudi Arabia
1995; Details	Kuwait City	Kuwait	No playoffs	South Korea	Bahrain	No playoffs	Japan
2000; Details	(Japan); Kumamoto	South Korea	No playoffs	China	Japan	No playoffs	Chinese Taipei
2002; Details	(Iran); Isfahan	Kuwait	29–25	Qatar	Saudi Arabia	38–33	South Korea
2004; Details	(Qatar); Doha	Kuwait	28–24	Japan	Qatar	27–26	Bahrain
2006; Details	(Thailand); Bangkok	Kuwait	33–30	South Korea	Qatar	21–20	Iran
2008; Details	(Iran); Isfahan	South Korea	27–21	Kuwait	Saudi Arabia	24–23	Iran
2010; Details	(Lebanon); Beirut	South Korea	32–25	Bahrain	Japan	33–30 OT	Saudi Arabia
2012; Details	(Saudi Arabia); Jeddah	South Korea	23–22	Qatar	Saudi Arabia	25–21	Japan
2014; Details	(Bahrain); Isa Town / Manama	Qatar	27–26	Bahrain	Iran	29–23	United Arab Emirates
2016; Details	(Bahrain); Isa Town / Manama	Qatar	27–22	Bahrain	Japan	25–16	Saudi Arabia
2018; Details	(South Korea); Suwon	Qatar	33–31	Bahrain	South Korea	29–21	Saudi Arabia
2020; Details	Kuwait City	Qatar	33–21	South Korea	Japan	27–26	Bahrain
2022; Details	(Saudi Arabia); Dammam / Qatif	Qatar	29–24	Bahrain	Saudi Arabia	26–23	Iran
2024; Details	(Bahrain); Isa Town / Manama	Qatar	30–24	Japan	Bahrain	26–17	Kuwait
2026; Details	(Kuwait); Sabah Al-Salem	Bahrain	29–26	Qatar	Kuwait	33–32	Japan

== Medal table ==
Rank	Nation	Gold	Silver	Bronze	Total
1	South Korea	9	4	1	14
2	Qatar	6	3	2	11
3	Kuwait	4	2	5	11
4	Japan	2	6	5	13
5	Bahrain	1	5	2	8
6	China	0	2	2	4
7	Saudi Arabia	0	0	4	4
8	Iran	0	0	1	1
Totals (8 entries)		22	22	22	66

== Participating nations ==
Nation	(Kuwait) 1977	(China) 1979	(South Korea) 1983	(Jordan) 1987	(China) 1989	(Japan) 1991	(Bahrain) 1993	(Kuwait) 1995	(Japan) 2000	(Iran) 2002	(Qatar) 2004	(Thailand) 2006	(Iran) 2008	(Lebanon) 2010	(Saudi Arabia) 2012	(Bahrain) 2014	(Bahrain) 2016	(South Korea) 2018	(Kuwait) 2020	(Saudi Arabia) 2022	(Bahrain) 2024	(Kuwait) 2026	Years
Australia																		11th	12th	16th	WD	14th	4
Bahrain	6th		4th	5th		5th	6th	3rd		7th	4th	6th	10th	2nd	6th	2nd	2nd	2nd	4th	2nd	3rd	1st	19
Bangladesh																		13th					1
China	3rd	2nd		4th	4th	3rd	5th	5th	2nd			8th	7th	9th		11th	9th	9th	11th		10th	9th	17
Chinese Taipei				7th	7th	7th	10th	7th	4th												11th		7
Hong Kong			8th		9th														10th	11th	13th	10th	6
India		5th						9th										12th		15th	16th	15th	6
Iran					8th	11th	9th		5th	5th	7th	4th	4th	7th	5th	3rd	5th	5th	6th	4th	6th	12th	17
Iraq	5th													10th		10th			9th	6th	8th	7th	7
Japan	1st	1st	2nd	2nd	2nd	2nd	3rd	4th	3rd	6th	2nd	5th	6th	3rd	4th	9th	3rd	6th	3rd	WD	2nd	4th	21
Jordan			7th	9th							8th	7th		12th	9th					12th		11th	8
Kazakhstan							11th	8th													14th		3
Kuwait	4th	3rd	3rd	3rd	3rd	8th	2nd	1st		1st	1st	1st	2nd		8th	7th			8th	7th	4th	3rd	18
Lebanon													9th	8th			10th						3
Nepal				11th																			1
New Zealand																		14th	13th		15th		3
North Korea						9th																	1
Oman											9th					8th	8th	8th		10th	12th	13th	7
Palestine	7th	4th		10th																			3
Qatar			6th	6th	6th	4th	7th			2nd	3rd	3rd	5th	5th	2nd	1st	1st	1st	1st	1st	1st	2nd	18
Saudi Arabia	8th		5th		5th	10th	4th		WD	3rd	5th	WD	3rd	4th	3rd	6th	4th	4th	7th	3rd	9th	6th	17
Singapore																				14th			1
South Korea	2nd		1st	1st	1st	1st	1st	2nd	1st	4th		2nd	1st	1st	1st	5th	6th	3rd	2nd	5th	5th	5th	19
Syria				8th		12th	12th							6th			11th						5
Thailand												9th											1
United Arab Emirates	9th					6th	8th	6th			6th		8th	11th	7th	4th	7th	7th	5th	9th	7th	8th	15
Uzbekistan															10th	12th		10th		8th			4
Vietnam																				13th			1
Total	9	5	8	11	9	12	12	9	5	7	9	9	10	12	10	12	11	14	13	16	16	15	

== See also ==
- Asian Men's Junior Handball Championship
- Asian Men's Youth Handball Championship
- Asian Women's Handball Championship
- Asian Women's Junior Handball Championship
- Asian Women's Youth Handball Championship
