= Syria men's national junior handball team =

Syria

Information
- Nickname: Nosour Qasioun (Arabic: نسور قاسيون, lit. 'Qasioun Eagles')
- Association: Syrian Arab Handball Federation

Colours
| 1st | 2nd |

Results

IHF U-21 World Championship
- Appearances: none

Asian Junior Championship
- Appearances: 6 (First in 1988)
- Best result: 3rd (1988, 1990)
- Last updated on 15 March 2022.

Syria men's national junior handball team
Medal record

Asian Junior Championship
| Bronze medal – third place | 1988 Damascus | Team |
| Bronze medal – third place | 1990 Tehran | Team |

The Syrian national junior handball team is the national under–20 handball team of Syria. Controlled by the Syrian Arab Handball Federation that is an affiliate of the International Handball Federation IHF as well as a member of the AHF.

== Tournament record ==
=== Asian Championship ===
Champions Runners up Third place Fourth place

- Red border color indicates tournament was held on home soil.

Asian Junior Championship record
| Year | Round | Position | GP | W | D | L | GS | GA | GD |
|---|---|---|---|---|---|---|---|---|---|
| (Syria) Damascus 1988 | Semi-finals | 3rd Place | – | – | – | – | – | – | – |
| (Iran) Tehran 1990 | Semi-finals | 3rd Place | – | – | – | – | – | – | – |
| (China) Beijing 1992 | Did Not Enter | | | | | | | | |
| (Syria) Hama 1994 | Group stage | Seventh Place | – | – | – | – | – | – | – |
| (Egypt) Dubai 1996 | Did not enter | | | | | | | | |
| (Bahrain) Manama 1998 | Did not enter | | | | | | | | |
| (Iran) Mashhad 2000 | Did not enter | | | | | | | | |
| (Thailand) Bangkok 2002 | Did not enter | | | | | | | | |
| (India) Hyderabad 2004 | Did not enter | | | | | | | | |
| (Japan) Hiroshima 2006 | Did not enter | | | | | | | | |
| (Jordan) Amman 2008 | Did not enter | | | | | | | | |
| (Iran) Tehran 2010 | Group stage | 7th Place | 3 | 0 | 1 | 2 | 71 | 111 | -40 |
| (Qatar) Doha 2012 | Did not enter | | | | | | | | |
| (Iran) Tabriz 2014 | Group stage | 7th Place | 7 | 2 | 1 | 4 | 169 | 204 | -35 |
| (Jordan) Amman 2016 | Did not enter | | | | | | | | |
| (Oman) Salalah 2018 | Group stage | 13th Place | 7 | 1 | 0 | 6 | 152 | 260 | -108 |
| (Bahrain) Manama 2020 | Tournament canceled | | | | | | | | |
| (Bahrain) Isa Town 2022 | Did Not Enter | | | | | | | | |
| (Jordan) Amman 2024 | Did Not Enter | | | | | | | | |
| Total | 6/18 | 0 Titles | – | – | – | – | – | – | – |

== See also ==
- Syria men's national handball team
