= Bangladesh men's national junior handball team =

Bangladeshi handball team

Bangladesh

Information
- Nickname: Red and Green Tigers
- Association: Bangladesh Handball Federation (BHF)
- Coach: Syed Ifterkhar Islam

Colours
1st	2nd

Results

IHF U-21 World Championship
- Appearances: 0

Asian Men's Junior Handball Championship
- Appearances: 1 (First in 2004)
- Best result: Group stage (2004)
- Last updated on 27 November 2025.

The Bangladesh national junior handball team is the national under-20 handball team of Bangladesh. It Controlled by the Bangladesh Handball Federation (BHF) that represents Bangladesh in the international handball tournaments.

== Tournament history ==
=== IHF Junior World Championship records ===
Champions Runners up Third place Fourth place

Year	Round	Position	GP	W	D	L	GS	GA	GD
1977 (Sweden)	Did not Qualify								
1979 (Denmark) (Sweden)	Did not Qualify								
1981 (Portugal)	Did not Qualify								
1983 (Finland)	Did not Qualify								
1985 (Italy)	Did not Qualify								
1987 (Socialist Federal Republic of Yugoslavia)	Did not Qualify								
1989 (Spain)	Did not Qualify								
1991 (Greece)	Did not Qualify								
1993 (Egypt)	Did not Qualify								
1995 (Argentina)	Did not Qualify								
1997 (Turkey)	Did not Qualify								
1999 (Qatar)	Did not Qualify								
2001 (Switzerland)	Did not Qualify								
2003 (Brazil)	Did not Qualify								
2005 (Hungary)	Did not Qualify								
2007 (North Macedonia)	Did not Qualify								
2009 (Egypt)	Did not Qualify								
2011 (Greece)	Did not Qualify								
2013 (Bosnia and Herzegovina)	Did not Qualify								
2015 (Brazil)	Did not Qualify								
2017 (Algeria)	Did not Qualify								
2019 (Spain)	Did not Qualify								
2023 (Germany)	Did not Qualify								
2025 (Poland)	Did not Qualify								
Total	0/24	0 Titles	0	0	0	0	0	0	0

=== Asian Championship ===
Champions Runners up Third place Fourth place

Asian Men's Junior Handball Championship records
Year	Result	Position	GP	W	D	L	GS	GA	GD
(Syria) 1988	Did not participate								
(Iran) 1990	Did not participate								
(China) 1992	Did not participate								
(Syria) 1994	Did not participate								
(Egypt) 1996	Did not participate								
(Bahrain) 1998	Did not participate								
(Iran) 2000	Did not participate								
(Thailand) 2002	Did not participate								
(India) 2004	Group stage	11/11	5	0	0	5	99	245	−146
(Japan) 2006	Did not participate								
(Jordan) 2008	Did not participate								
(Iran) 2010	Did not participate								
(Qatar) 2012	Did not participate								
(Iran) 2014	Did not participate								
(Jordan) 2016	Did not participate								
(Oman) 2018	Did not participate								
(Bahrain) 2020	Tournament did not held								
(Bahrain) 2022	Did not participate								
(Jordan) 2024	Did not participate								
(China) 2026	Did not participate								
Total	1/19	0 Titles	5	0	0	5	99	245	−146
