= Qatar Handball Association =

Governing body of handball in Qatar

Qatar Handball Association QHA
- IOC nation: State of Qatar (QAT)
- Sport: Handball
- Other sports: Beach handball; Wheelchair handball
- Official website: www.qatarhandball.com

AFFILIATIONS
- International federation: International Handball Federation (IHF)
- IHF member since: 1978; 48 years ago
- Continental association: Asian Handball Federation
- National Olympic Committee: Qatar Olympic Committee
- Other affiliation(s): West Asian Handball Association

GOVERNING BODY
- President: Mr. Ahmad Mohammad Al-Shaabi (Qatar)

HEADQUARTERS
- Address: Qatar Handball Association Complex, Doha
- Country: Qatar
- Secretary General: Mr. Mohammad Jabir Al-Mulla (Qatar)

FINANCE
- Sponsors: Qatar Airways

The Qatar Handball Association (QHA) (Arabic: الاتحاد القطري لكرة اليد) is the governing body of handball and beach handball in Qatar. QHA is affiliated to the Asian Handball Federation (AHF), Qatar Olympic Committee and International Handball Federation (IHF) since 1978.

== National teams ==
- Qatar men's national handball team
- Qatar men's national junior handball team
- Qatar men's national youth handball team
- Qatar women's national handball team
- Qatar women's national junior handball team
- Qatar women's national youth handball team

== Competitions hosted ==
=== International ===
- 2018 IHF Super Globe
- 2017 IHF Super Globe
- 2016 IHF Super Globe
- 2015 World Men's Handball Championship
- 2015 IHF Super Globe
- 2014 IHF Super Globe
- 2013 IHF Super Globe
- 2012 IHF Super Globe
- 2011 IHF Super Globe
- 2010 IHF Super Globe
- 2005 Men's Youth World Handball Championship
- 2002 IHF Super Globe
- 1999 Men's Junior World Handball Championship

=== Continental ===
- 2016 West Asian Women's Handball Championship
- 2015 Asian Men's Club League Handball Championship
- 2014 Asian Men's Club League Handball Championship
- 2013 Asian Men's Club League Handball Championship
- 2012 Asian Men's Club League Handball Championship
- 2012 Asian Men's Junior Handball Championship
- 2006 Asian Games
- 2005 West Asian Games
- 2004 Asian Men's Handball Championship

== Medals Table (Handball) ==
=== International medals ===
Championship	Medal
2015 World Men's Handball Championship	2nd place, silver medalist(s)

=== Continental medals ===
Championship	Medal
1994 Asian Men's Junior Handball Championship	1st place, gold medalist(s)
2010 Asian Men's Junior Handball Championship	1st place, gold medalist(s)
2010 Asian Men's Youth Handball Championship	1st place, gold medalist(s)
2012 Asian Men's Junior Handball Championship	1st place, gold medalist(s)
2012 Asian Men's Youth Handball Championship	1st place, gold medalist(s)
2013 Asian Youth Games (Men's)	1st place, gold medalist(s)
2014 Asian Games (Men's)	1st place, gold medalist(s)
2014 Asian Men's Handball Championship	1st place, gold medalist(s)
2014 Asian Men's Junior Handball Championship	1st place, gold medalist(s)
2016 Asian Men's Handball Championship	1st place, gold medalist(s)
2016 Asian Men's Junior Handball Championship	1st place, gold medalist(s)
2000 Asian Men's Junior Handball Championship	2nd place, silver medalist(s)
2002 Asian Men's Handball Championship	2nd place, silver medalist(s)
2002 Asian Men's Junior Handball Championship	2nd place, silver medalist(s)
2006 Asian Games (Men's)	2nd place, silver medalist(s)
2006 Asian Men's Youth Handball Championship	2nd place, silver medalist(s)
2008 Asian Men's Youth Handball Championship	2nd place, silver medalist(s)
2012 Asian Men's Handball Championship	2nd place, silver medalist(s)
2014 Asian Men's Youth Handball Championship	2nd place, silver medalist(s)
1996 Asian Men's Junior Handball Championship	3rd place, bronze medalist(s)
2002 Asian Games (Men's)	3rd place, bronze medalist(s)
2004 Asian Men's Handball Championship	3rd place, bronze medalist(s)
2006 Asian Men's Handball Championship	3rd place, bronze medalist(s)
2008 Asian Men's Junior Handball Championship	3rd place, bronze medalist(s)

== Medals Table (Beach Handball) ==
=== International medals ===
Championship	Medal
2014 Beach Handball World Championships	3rd place, bronze medalist(s)
2016 Beach Handball World Championships	3rd place, bronze medalist(s)

=== Continental medals ===
Championship	Medal
2011 Asian Beach Handball Championship	1st place, gold medalist(s)
2013 Asian Beach Handball Championship	1st place, gold medalist(s)
2015 Asian Beach Handball Championship	1st place, gold medalist(s)
2017 Asian Beach Handball Championship	1st place, gold medalist(s)
2012 Asian Beach Games (Men's)	1st place, gold medalist(s)
2014 Asian Beach Games (Men's)	1st place, gold medalist(s)
2016 Asian Beach Games (Men's)	1st place, gold medalist(s)

== Affiliated Clubs ==
- Al Arabi SC
- Al-Duhail SC
- Al Rayyan SC
- Al Sadd SC
- El Jaish SC
