= Saudi Arabian Handball Federation =

Governing body of handball in Saudi Arabia

Saudi Arabian Handball Federation Arabic: الاتحاد العربي السعودي لكرة اليد SAHF
- IOC nation: Kingdom of Saudi Arabia (KSA)
- Sport: Handball
- Other sports: Beach Handball; Wheelchair Handball
- Official website: sahf.org.sa

HISTORY
- Year of formation: 1975; 50 years ago

AFFILIATIONS
- International federation: International Handball Federation (IHF)
- IHF member since: 1975
- Continental association: Asian Handball Federation
- National Olympic Committee: Saudi Arabian Olympic Committee
- Other affiliation(s): West Asian Handball Federation; Arab Handball Federation

GOVERNING BODY
- President: Mr. Turki Sulaiman Al-Khelaiwi (Saudi Arabia)
- Address: Prince Faisal bin Fahd Stadium, Riyadh
- Country: Saudi Arabia

The Saudi Arabian Handball Federation (SAHF) (Arabic: الاتحاد العربي السعودي لكرة اليد) is the governing body of handball and beach handball in the Kingdom of Saudi Arabia. Founded in 1975, SAHF is affiliated to the International Handball Federation and Asian Handball Federation. SAHF is also affiliated to the Saudi Arabian Olympic Committee, West Asian Handball Federation and the Arab Handball Federation. It is based in Riyadh.

== Competitions ==
- Saudi Handball League

== National teams ==
- Saudi Arabia men's national handball team
- Saudi Arabia men's national junior handball team
- Saudi Arabia women's national handball team

== Competitions hosted ==
=== International ===
- 2022 IHF Men's Super Globe
- 2021 IHF Men's Super Globe
- 2019 IHF Super Globe

=== Continental ===
- 2022 Asian Men's Handball Championship
- 2020 Asian Men's Club League Handball Championship
- 2012 Asian Men's Handball Championship
- 2011 Asian Men's Club League Handball Championship
- 2008 Asian Men's Club League Handball Championship

== International medals ==
Championship	Medal
1996 Asian Men's Junior Handball Championship	2nd place, silver medalist(s)
1998 Asian Men's Junior Handball Championship	2nd place, silver medalist(s)
2016 Asian Men's Junior Handball Championship	2nd place, silver medalist(s)
1990 Asian Games	3rd place, bronze medalist(s)
1994 Asian Men's Junior Handball Championship	3rd place, bronze medalist(s)
2002 Asian Men's Handball Championship	3rd place, bronze medalist(s)
2006 Asian Men's Junior Handball Championship	3rd place, bronze medalist(s)
2008 Asian Men's Handball Championship	3rd place, bronze medalist(s)
2012 Asian Men's Handball Championship	3rd place, bronze medalist(s)
