= 2012 Asian Men's Junior Handball Championship =

2012 handball championship in Asia

2012 Asian Junior Championship
Tournament details
- Host country: Qatar
- Venue(s): 1 (in 1 host city)
- Dates: 30 June – 13 July 2012
- Teams: 14

Final positions
- Champions: Qatar (3rd title)
- Runner-up: South Korea
- Third place: Kuwait
- Fourth place: Saudi Arabia

Tournament statistics
- Matches played: 49
- Goals scored: 2,774 (56.61 per match)

The 2012 Asian Men's Junior Handball Championship (13th tournament) took place in Doha from June 30 – July 13. It acted as the Asian qualifying tournament for the 2013 Men's Junior World Handball Championship.

== Draw ==
Group A	Group B	Group C
United Arab Emirates; Uzbekistan; Saudi Arabia; Qatar	Iran; Japan; Hong Kong; Macau; Iraq	South Korea; Bahrain; Lebanon; Chinese Taipei; Kuwait

== Preliminary round ==
=== Group A ===
Team	Pld	W	D	L	GF	GA	GD	Pts
Qatar	3	3	0	0	112	74	+38	6
Saudi Arabia	3	2	0	1	102	60	+42	4
United Arab Emirates	3	1	0	2	83	78	+5	2
Uzbekistan	3	0	0	3	54	139	−85	0

30 June 2012; 18:00	Qatar	55–26	Uzbekistan	Qatar SC Indoor Stadium, Doha
30 June 2012; 18:00		(27–13)		Qatar SC Indoor Stadium, Doha

1 July 2012; 16:00	Uzbekistan	10–45	Saudi Arabia	Qatar SC Indoor Stadium, Doha
1 July 2012; 16:00		(4–23)		Qatar SC Indoor Stadium, Doha

2 July 2012; 16:00	Saudi Arabia	31–22	United Arab Emirates	Qatar SC Indoor Stadium, Doha
2 July 2012; 16:00		(15–11)		Qatar SC Indoor Stadium, Doha

3 July 2012; 18:00	United Arab Emirates	22–29	Qatar	Qatar SC Indoor Stadium, Doha
3 July 2012; 18:00		(11–17)		Qatar SC Indoor Stadium, Doha

4 July 2012; 18:00	Saudi Arabia	26–28	Qatar	Qatar SC Indoor Stadium, Doha
4 July 2012; 18:00		(14–14)		Qatar SC Indoor Stadium, Doha

5 July 2012; 16:00	United Arab Emirates	39–18	Uzbekistan	Qatar SC Indoor Stadium, Doha
5 July 2012; 16:00		(18–9)		Qatar SC Indoor Stadium, Doha

=== Group B ===
Team	Pld	W	D	L	GF	GA	GD	Pts
Japan	4	4	0	0	144	67	+77	8
Iran	4	3	0	1	151	93	+58	6
Iraq	4	2	0	2	116	88	+28	4
Hong Kong	4	1	0	3	77	121	−44	2
Macau	4	0	0	4	61	180	−119	0

30 June 2012; 12:00	Japan	48–12	Macau	Qatar SC Indoor Stadium, Doha
30 June 2012; 12:00		(22–7)		Qatar SC Indoor Stadium, Doha

30 June 2012; 16:00	Iraq	24–29	Iran	Qatar SC Indoor Stadium, Doha
30 June 2012; 16:00		(13–11)		Qatar SC Indoor Stadium, Doha

1 July 2012; 12:00	Iran	69–15	Macau	Qatar SC Indoor Stadium, Doha
1 July 2012; 12:00		(35–4)		Qatar SC Indoor Stadium, Doha

1 July 2012; 14:00	Hong Kong	16–32	Japan	Qatar SC Indoor Stadium, Doha
1 July 2012; 14:00		(11–15)		Qatar SC Indoor Stadium, Doha

2 July 2012; 12:00	Japan	29–17	Iraq	Qatar SC Indoor Stadium, Doha
2 July 2012; 12:00		(16–11)		Qatar SC Indoor Stadium, Doha

2 July 2012; 14:00	Macau	22–24	Hong Kong	Qatar SC Indoor Stadium, Doha
2 July 2012; 14:00		(7–10)		Qatar SC Indoor Stadium, Doha

4 July 2012; 12:00	Hong Kong	19–31	Iran	Qatar SC Indoor Stadium, Doha
4 July 2012; 12:00		(12–13)		Qatar SC Indoor Stadium, Doha

4 July 2012; 20:00	Iraq	39–12	Macau	Qatar SC Indoor Stadium, Doha
4 July 2012; 20:00		(21–4)		Qatar SC Indoor Stadium, Doha

5 July 2012; 14:00	Iraq	36–18	Hong Kong	Qatar SC Indoor Stadium, Doha
5 July 2012; 14:00		(18–6)		Qatar SC Indoor Stadium, Doha

5 July 2012; 18:00	Iran	22–35	Japan	Qatar SC Indoor Stadium, Doha
5 July 2012; 18:00		(11–17)		Qatar SC Indoor Stadium, Doha

=== Group C ===
Team	Pld	W	D	L	GF	GA	GD	Pts
Kuwait	4	3	0	1	113	84	+29	6
South Korea	4	3	0	1	139	104	+35	6
Bahrain	4	3	0	1	122	107	+15	6
Chinese Taipei	4	1	0	3	102	115	−13	2
Lebanon	4	0	0	4	89	155	−66	0

30 June 2012; 14:00	Bahrain	30–24	Chinese Taipei	Qatar SC Indoor Stadium, Doha
30 June 2012; 14:00		(12–11)		Qatar SC Indoor Stadium, Doha

30 June 2012; 20:00	Kuwait	33–20	South Korea	Qatar SC Indoor Stadium, Doha
30 June 2012; 20:00		(16–12)		Qatar SC Indoor Stadium, Doha

1 July 2012; 18:00	South Korea	29–22	Chinese Taipei	Qatar SC Indoor Stadium, Doha
1 July 2012; 18:00		(16–10)		Qatar SC Indoor Stadium, Doha

1 July 2012; 20:00	Lebanon	21–40	Bahrain	Qatar SC Indoor Stadium, Doha
1 July 2012; 20:00		(13–17)		Qatar SC Indoor Stadium, Doha

2 July 2012; 18:00	Bahrain	25–22	Kuwait	Qatar SC Indoor Stadium, Doha
2 July 2012; 18:00		(15–12)		Qatar SC Indoor Stadium, Doha

2 July 2012; 20:00	Chinese Taipei	37–26	Lebanon	Qatar SC Indoor Stadium, Doha
2 July 2012; 20:00		(23–9)		Qatar SC Indoor Stadium, Doha

4 July 2012; 14:00	Kuwait	30–19	Chinese Taipei	Qatar SC Indoor Stadium, Doha
4 July 2012; 14:00		(18–10)		Qatar SC Indoor Stadium, Doha

4 July 2012; 16:00	Lebanon	22–50	South Korea	Qatar SC Indoor Stadium, Doha
4 July 2012; 16:00		(10–28)		Qatar SC Indoor Stadium, Doha

5 July 2012; 12:00	Kuwait	28–20	Lebanon	Qatar SC Indoor Stadium, Doha
5 July 2012; 12:00		(12–5)		Qatar SC Indoor Stadium, Doha

5 July 2012; 20:00	South Korea	40–27	Bahrain	Qatar SC Indoor Stadium, Doha
5 July 2012; 20:00		(13–7)		Qatar SC Indoor Stadium, Doha

== Placement 13th/14th ==
7 July 2012; 12:00	Lebanon	45–19	Macau	Qatar SC Indoor Stadium, Doha
7 July 2012; 12:00		(19–7)		Qatar SC Indoor Stadium, Doha

== Main round ==
=== Group A ===
Team	Pld	W	D	L	GF	GA	GD	Pts
Qatar	2	2	0	0	63	56	+7	4
Kuwait	2	1	0	1	61	58	+3	2
Iran	2	0	0	2	57	67	−10	0

7 July 2012; 18:00	Kuwait	26–31	Qatar	Qatar SC Indoor Stadium, Doha
7 July 2012; 18:00		(10–18)		Qatar SC Indoor Stadium, Doha

8 July 2012; 18:00	Iran	27–35	Kuwait	Qatar SC Indoor Stadium, Doha
8 July 2012; 18:00		(13–18)		Qatar SC Indoor Stadium, Doha

9 July 2012; 18:00	Qatar	32–30	Iran	Qatar SC Indoor Stadium, Doha
9 July 2012; 18:00		(15–11)		Qatar SC Indoor Stadium, Doha

=== Group B ===
Team	Pld	W	D	L	GF	GA	GD	Pts
South Korea	2	2	0	0	72	45	+27	4
Saudi Arabia	2	1	0	1	55	66	−11	2
Japan	2	0	0	2	50	66	−16	0

7 July 2012; 20:00	South Korea	37–24	Saudi Arabia	Qatar SC Indoor Stadium, Doha
7 July 2012; 20:00		(15–13)		Qatar SC Indoor Stadium, Doha

8 July 2012; 20:00	Japan	21–35	South Korea	Qatar SC Indoor Stadium, Doha
8 July 2012; 20:00		(11–15)		Qatar SC Indoor Stadium, Doha

9 July 2012; 20:00	Saudi Arabia	31–29	Japan	Qatar SC Indoor Stadium, Doha
9 July 2012; 20:00		(18–12)		Qatar SC Indoor Stadium, Doha

=== Group C ===
Team	Pld	W	D	L	GF	GA	GD	Pts
Bahrain	2	2	0	0	76	47	+29	4
United Arab Emirates	2	1	0	1	67	61	+6	2
Hong Kong	2	0	0	2	39	74	−35	0

7 July 2012; 14:00	Bahrain	40–29	United Arab Emirates	Qatar SC Indoor Stadium, Doha
7 July 2012; 14:00		(17–14)		Qatar SC Indoor Stadium, Doha

8 July 2012; 14:00	Hong Kong	18–36	Bahrain	Qatar SC Indoor Stadium, Doha
8 July 2012; 14:00		(10–19)		Qatar SC Indoor Stadium, Doha

9 July 2012; 14:00	United Arab Emirates	38–21	Hong Kong	Qatar SC Indoor Stadium, Doha
9 July 2012; 14:00		(16–10)		Qatar SC Indoor Stadium, Doha

=== Group D ===
Team	Pld	W	D	L	GF	GA	GD	Pts
Iraq	2	1	1	0	58	47	+11	3
Chinese Taipei	2	1	1	0	53	45	+8	3
Uzbekistan	2	0	0	2	40	59	−19	0

7 July 2012; 16:00	Chinese Taipei	27–19	Uzbekistan	Qatar SC Indoor Stadium, Doha
7 July 2012; 16:00		(13–9)		Qatar SC Indoor Stadium, Doha

8 July 2012; 16:00	Iraq	26–26	Chinese Taipei	Qatar SC Indoor Stadium, Doha
8 July 2012; 16:00		(12–12)		Qatar SC Indoor Stadium, Doha

9 July 2012; 16:00	Uzbekistan	21–32	Iraq	Qatar SC Indoor Stadium, Doha
9 July 2012; 16:00		(12–13)		Qatar SC Indoor Stadium, Doha

== Placement 11th/12th ==
11 July 2012; 10:00	Hong Kong	23–18	Uzbekistan	Qatar SC Indoor Stadium, Doha
11 July 2012; 10:00		(9–12)		Qatar SC Indoor Stadium, Doha

== Placement 7th–10th ==
Semifinals
11 July – Doha
Bahrain	32
Chinese Taipei	24
11 July – Doha
Iraq	27
United Arab Emirates	31

7th/8th
13 July – Doha
Bahrain	32
United Arab Emirates	30
9th/10th
13 July – Doha
Chinese Taipei	25
Iraq	22

=== Semifinals ===
11 July 2012; 14:00	Bahrain	32–24	Chinese Taipei	Qatar SC Indoor Stadium, Doha
11 July 2012; 14:00		(19–12)		Qatar SC Indoor Stadium, Doha

11 July 2012; 16:00	Iraq	27–31	United Arab Emirates	Qatar SC Indoor Stadium, Doha
11 July 2012; 16:00		(12–15)		Qatar SC Indoor Stadium, Doha

=== 9th/10th ===
13 July 2012; 10:00	Chinese Taipei	25–22	Iraq	Qatar SC Indoor Stadium, Doha
13 July 2012; 10:00		(12–13)		Qatar SC Indoor Stadium, Doha

=== 7th/8th ===
13 July 2012; 12:00	Bahrain	32–30	United Arab Emirates	Qatar SC Indoor Stadium, Doha
13 July 2012; 12:00		(18–11)		Qatar SC Indoor Stadium, Doha

== Placement 5th/6th ==
11 July 2012; 12:00	Iran	30–35	Japan	Qatar SC Indoor Stadium, Doha
11 July 2012; 12:00		(16–20)		Qatar SC Indoor Stadium, Doha

== Final round ==
Semifinals
11 July – Doha
Qatar	32
Saudi Arabia	25
11 July – Doha
South Korea	37
Kuwait	26

Gold medal match
13 July – Doha
Qatar	25
South Korea	22
Bronze medal match
13 July – Doha
Saudi Arabia	28
Kuwait (ET)	30

=== Semifinals ===
11 July 2012; 18:00	Qatar	32–25	Saudi Arabia	Qatar SC Indoor Stadium, Doha
11 July 2012; 18:00		(16–14)		Qatar SC Indoor Stadium, Doha

11 July 2012; 20:00	South Korea	37–26	Kuwait	Qatar SC Indoor Stadium, Doha
11 July 2012; 20:00		(17–12)		Qatar SC Indoor Stadium, Doha

=== Bronze medal match ===
13 July 2012
16:00
Saudi Arabia
28–30 (ET)
Kuwait
Qatar SC Indoor Stadium, Doha

(14–12)

FT: 24–24 ET: 4–6

=== Gold medal match ===
13 July 2012; 18:00	Qatar	25–22	South Korea	Qatar SC Indoor Stadium, Doha
13 July 2012; 18:00		(12–10)		Qatar SC Indoor Stadium, Doha

== Final standing ==
Rank	Team
1st place, gold medalist(s)	Qatar
2nd place, silver medalist(s)	South Korea
3rd place, bronze medalist(s)	Kuwait
4	Saudi Arabia
5	Japan
6	Iran
7	Bahrain
8	United Arab Emirates
9	Chinese Taipei
10	Iraq
11	Hong Kong
12	Uzbekistan
13	Lebanon
14	Macau

Team qualified for the 2013 Junior World Championship
