= Handball at the 2002 West Asian Games =

West Asian Sport Game

- Venue: Daiya Youth Center
- Date: 5–11 April 2002

The Handball competition was contested at the 2002 West Asian Games in Kuwait City, Kuwait, from 5 to 11 April 2002. All matches took place at Daiya Youth Center.

== Results ==
Pos	Team	Pld	W	D	L	GF	GA	GD	Pts
1	Kuwait	5	5	0	0	152	117	+35	10
2	Syria	5	4	0	1	154	140	+14	8
3	United Arab Emirates	5	3	0	2	137	135	+2	6
4	Iran	5	2	0	3	148	139	+9	4
5	Qatar	5	1	0	4	112	141	−29	2
6	Oman	5	0	0	5	134	165	−31	0

Source: Results

5 April; 16:00	United Arab Emirates	25–24	Iran	Daiya Youth Center, Kuwait City

5 April; 18:00	Oman	22–33	Kuwait	Daiya Youth Center, Kuwait City

5 April; 20:00	Qatar	18–30	Syria	Daiya Youth Center, Kuwait City

6 April; 16:00	Kuwait	29–24	Qatar	Daiya Youth Center, Kuwait City

6 April; 18:00	Iran	41–31	Oman	Daiya Youth Center, Kuwait City

6 April; 20:00	Syria	29–28	United Arab Emirates	Daiya Youth Center, Kuwait City

8 April; 16:00	Syria	37–30	Oman	Daiya Youth Center, Kuwait City

8 April; 18:00	Qatar	24–29	United Arab Emirates	Daiya Youth Center, Kuwait City

8 April; 20:00	Kuwait	28–21	Iran	Daiya Youth Center, Kuwait City

9 April; 16:00	Oman	23–24	Qatar	Daiya Youth Center, Kuwait City

9 April; 18:00	Iran	32–33	Syria	Daiya Youth Center, Kuwait City

9 April; 20:00	Kuwait	30–25	United Arab Emirates	Daiya Youth Center, Kuwait City

11 April; 16:00	Iran	30–22	Qatar	Daiya Youth Center, Kuwait City

11 April; 18:00	United Arab Emirates	30–28	Oman	Daiya Youth Center, Kuwait City

11 April; 20:00	Syria	25–32	Kuwait	Daiya Youth Center, Kuwait City
