= 2022 Asian Men's Handball Championship =

Tournament details
- Host country: Saudi Arabia
- Venues: 2 (in 2 host cities)
- Dates: 18–31 January
- Teams: 16

Final positions
- Champions: Qatar (5th title)
- Runners-up: Bahrain
- Third place: Saudi Arabia
- Fourth place: Iran

Tournament statistics
- Matches played: 53
- Goals scored: 2,923 (55.15 per match)

The 2022 Asian Men's Handball Championship was the 20th edition of the Asian Men's Handball Championship, held from 18 to 31 January 2022 in Saudi Arabia under the aegis of the International Handball Federation (IHF) and Asian Handball Federation (AHF). It was the second time in history that the championship was organised by the Saudi Arabian Handball Federation (SAHF). It also acted as a qualification tournament for the 2023 World Men's Handball Championship, with the top five teams from the championship directly qualifying for the event.

Initially, the championship was scheduled to be held in Kerman Iran, but on 1 September 2021, the AHF decided to move the event to Saudi Arabia due to the spread of COVID-19 in Iran.

Qatar won their fifth consecutive and overall title by defeating Bahrain in the final.

== Venues ==
The tournament was played at two venues.

2022 Asian Men's Handball Championship is located in Saudi Arabia	Dammam
2022 Asian Men's Handball Championship is located in Saudi Arabia	Ministry of Sports Hall
2022 Asian Men's Handball Championship is located in Saudi Arabia	Capacity: 5,000
2022 Asian Men's Handball Championship is located in Saudi Arabia	Qatif
2022 Asian Men's Handball Championship is located in Saudi Arabia	Prince Nayef Sports City Hall
2022 Asian Men's Handball Championship is located in Saudi Arabia	Capacity: 4,000

== Draw ==
The draw was held on 6 December 2021 at the King Abdulaziz Center for World Culture, Dhahran.

=== Seeding ===
Teams were seeded according to AHF Competition and Organization Commission (COC) regulations, as well as according to rankings from the previous edition of the championship. Teams who had not participated in the previous edition were allocated to Pot 4.

Pot 1	Pot 2	Pot 3	Pot 4
Qatar; South Korea; ~~Japan~~; Saudi Arabia	Bahrain; United Arab Emirates; Iran; Kuwait	Iraq; Hong Kong; Australia	Oman; Jordan; ~~India~~; ~~Uzbekistan~~; ~~Singapore~~; ~~Vietnam~~

- Thailand withdrew before the draw.
- Japan withdrew due to several positive COVID-19 tests inside their team.

== Preliminary round ==
All times are local (UTC+3).

=== Group A ===
Pos	Team	Pld	W	D	L	GF	GA	GD	Pts	Qualification
1	South Korea	3	3	0	0	95	59	+36	6	Group I
2	Kuwait	3	2	0	1	111	72	+39	4	Group II
3	Jordan	3	1	0	2	95	89	+6	2	Group III
4	Singapore	3	0	0	3	42	123	−81	0	Group IV

Source: SAHF
Rules for classification: 1) points; 2) head-to-head points; 3) head-to-head goal difference; 4) head-to-head number of goals scored; 5) goal difference.

18 January 2022; 12:00	Singapore	9–40	South Korea	Ministry of Sports Hall, Dammam; Referees: Jawad, Al-Shamrookh (BHR)
18 January 2022; 12:00	Bala, Chew 2	(6–21)	Kim Jin-h. 10	Ministry of Sports Hall, Dammam; Referees: Jawad, Al-Shamrookh (BHR)
18 January 2022; 12:00	2× (suspension)	Report	2× (yellow card)	Ministry of Sports Hall, Dammam; Referees: Jawad, Al-Shamrookh (BHR)

18 January 2022; 14:00	Jordan	31–42	Kuwait	Ministry of Sports Hall, Dammam; Referees: Hussein, Imran (IRQ)
18 January 2022; 14:00		(14–19)		Ministry of Sports Hall, Dammam; Referees: Hussein, Imran (IRQ)
18 January 2022; 14:00		Report		Ministry of Sports Hall, Dammam; Referees: Hussein, Imran (IRQ)

19 January 2022; 12:00	Kuwait	43–14	Singapore	Prince Nayef Sports City Hall, Qatif; Referees: Kim, Park (KOR)
19 January 2022; 12:00		(21–8)		Prince Nayef Sports City Hall, Qatif; Referees: Kim, Park (KOR)
19 January 2022; 12:00		Report		Prince Nayef Sports City Hall, Qatif; Referees: Kim, Park (KOR)

19 January 2022; 18:00	South Korea	28–24	Jordan	Prince Nayef Sports City Hall, Qatif; Referees: Gasmi, Gasmi (FRA)
19 January 2022; 18:00	Kang 6	(14–13)	Abu Hasan 11	Prince Nayef Sports City Hall, Qatif; Referees: Gasmi, Gasmi (FRA)
19 January 2022; 18:00	3× (suspension)	Report	1× (yellow card) 4× (suspension)	Prince Nayef Sports City Hall, Qatif; Referees: Gasmi, Gasmi (FRA)

20 January 2022; 14:00	Singapore	19–40	Jordan	Ministry of Sports Hall, Dammam
20 January 2022; 14:00		(10–19)		Ministry of Sports Hall, Dammam
20 January 2022; 14:00		Report		Ministry of Sports Hall, Dammam

20 January 2022; 18:00	Kuwait	26–27	South Korea	Prince Nayef Sports City Hall, Qatif; Referees: Hussein, Imran (IRQ)
20 January 2022; 18:00		(11–12)		Prince Nayef Sports City Hall, Qatif; Referees: Hussein, Imran (IRQ)
20 January 2022; 18:00		Report		Prince Nayef Sports City Hall, Qatif; Referees: Hussein, Imran (IRQ)

=== Group B ===
Pos	Team	Pld	W	D	L	GF	GA	GD	Pts	Qualification
1	Iran	3	3	0	0	98	59	+39	6	Group II
2	Saudi Arabia (H)	3	2	0	1	104	67	+37	4	Group I
3	Australia	3	1	0	2	50	88	−38	2	Group IV
4	India	3	0	0	3	85	123	−38	0	Group III

Source: SAHF
Rules for classification: 1) points; 2) head-to-head points; 3) head-to-head goal difference; 4) head-to-head number of goals scored; 5) goal difference.
(H) Hosts

18 January 2022; 18:00	Australia	10–32	Iran	Prince Nayef Sports City Hall, Qatif; Referees: Lee, Koo (KOR)
18 January 2022; 18:00		(5–16)		Prince Nayef Sports City Hall, Qatif; Referees: Lee, Koo (KOR)
18 January 2022; 18:00		Report		Prince Nayef Sports City Hall, Qatif; Referees: Lee, Koo (KOR)

18 January 2022; 19:00	India	30–54	Saudi Arabia	Ministry of Sports Hall, Dammam; Referees: Kim, Park (KOR)
18 January 2022; 19:00		(14–26)		Ministry of Sports Hall, Dammam; Referees: Kim, Park (KOR)
18 January 2022; 19:00		Report		Ministry of Sports Hall, Dammam; Referees: Kim, Park (KOR)

19 January 2022; 16:00	Iran	42–29	India	Prince Nayef Sports City Hall, Qatif
19 January 2022; 16:00		(18–14)		Prince Nayef Sports City Hall, Qatif
19 January 2022; 16:00		Report		Prince Nayef Sports City Hall, Qatif

19 January 2022; 18:00	Saudi Arabia	30–13	Australia	Ministry of Sports Hall, Dammam; Referees: Al-Wahibi, Al-Shahi (OMA)
19 January 2022; 18:00		(16–7)		Ministry of Sports Hall, Dammam; Referees: Al-Wahibi, Al-Shahi (OMA)
19 January 2022; 18:00		Report		Ministry of Sports Hall, Dammam; Referees: Al-Wahibi, Al-Shahi (OMA)

20 January 2022; 12:00	India	26–27	Australia	Ministry of Sports Hall, Dammam
20 January 2022; 12:00		(13–14)		Ministry of Sports Hall, Dammam
20 January 2022; 12:00		Report		Ministry of Sports Hall, Dammam

20 January 2022; 18:00	Iran	24–20	Saudi Arabia	Ministry of Sports Hall, Dammam; Referees: Lee, Koo (KOR)
20 January 2022; 18:00		(9–13)		Ministry of Sports Hall, Dammam; Referees: Lee, Koo (KOR)
20 January 2022; 18:00		Report		Ministry of Sports Hall, Dammam; Referees: Lee, Koo (KOR)

=== Group C ===
Pos	Team	Pld	W	D	L	GF	GA	GD	Pts	Qualification
1	Qatar	3	3	0	0	90	53	+37	6	Group I
2	Iraq	3	2	0	1	85	97	−12	4	Group II
3	United Arab Emirates	3	1	0	2	72	77	−5	2	Group III
4	Oman	3	0	0	3	66	86	−20	0	Group IV

Source: SAHF
Rules for classification: 1) points; 2) head-to-head points; 3) head-to-head goal difference; 4) head-to-head number of goals scored; 5) goal difference.

18 January 2022; 16:00	Iraq	32–31	United Arab Emirates	Ministry of Sports Hall, Dammam; Referees: Gasmi, Gasmi (FRA)
18 January 2022; 16:00		(14–15)		Ministry of Sports Hall, Dammam; Referees: Gasmi, Gasmi (FRA)
18 January 2022; 16:00		Report		Ministry of Sports Hall, Dammam; Referees: Gasmi, Gasmi (FRA)

18 January 2022; 16:00	Oman	14–31	Qatar	Prince Nayef Sports City Hall, Qatif
18 January 2022; 16:00		(7–14)		Prince Nayef Sports City Hall, Qatif
18 January 2022; 16:00		Report		Prince Nayef Sports City Hall, Qatif

19 January 2022; 14:00	United Arab Emirates	24–23	Oman	Prince Nayef Sports City Hall, Qatif; Referees: Lee, Koo (KOR)
19 January 2022; 14:00		(14–15)		Prince Nayef Sports City Hall, Qatif; Referees: Lee, Koo (KOR)
19 January 2022; 14:00		Report		Prince Nayef Sports City Hall, Qatif; Referees: Lee, Koo (KOR)

19 January 2022; 14:00	Qatar	37–22	Iraq	Ministry of Sports Hall, Dammam
19 January 2022; 14:00		(17–9)		Ministry of Sports Hall, Dammam
19 January 2022; 14:00		Report		Ministry of Sports Hall, Dammam

20 January 2022; 16:00	United Arab Emirates	17–22	Qatar	Prince Nayef Sports City Hall, Qatif; Referees: Kim, Park (KOR)
20 January 2022; 16:00		(7–10)		Prince Nayef Sports City Hall, Qatif; Referees: Kim, Park (KOR)
20 January 2022; 16:00		Report		Prince Nayef Sports City Hall, Qatif; Referees: Kim, Park (KOR)

20 January 2022; 16:00	Oman	29–31	Iraq	Ministry of Sports Hall, Dammam; Referees: Gasmi, Gasmi (FRA)
20 January 2022; 16:00		(16–14)		Ministry of Sports Hall, Dammam; Referees: Gasmi, Gasmi (FRA)
20 January 2022; 16:00		Report		Ministry of Sports Hall, Dammam; Referees: Gasmi, Gasmi (FRA)

=== Group D ===
Pos	Team	Pld	W	D	L	GF	GA	GD	Pts	Qualification
1	Bahrain	3	3	0	0	127	53	+74	6	Group II
2	Uzbekistan	3	2	0	1	77	82	−5	4	Group I
3	Hong Kong	3	1	0	2	75	101	−26	2	Group IV
4	Vietnam	3	0	0	3	64	107	−43	0	Group III

Source: SAHF
Rules for classification: 1) points; 2) head-to-head points; 3) head-to-head goal difference; 4) head-to-head number of goals scored; 5) goal difference.

18 January 2022; 12:00	Uzbekistan	28–24	Hong Kong	Prince Nayef Sports City Hall, Qatif
18 January 2022; 12:00		(12–16)		Prince Nayef Sports City Hall, Qatif
18 January 2022; 12:00		Report		Prince Nayef Sports City Hall, Qatif

18 January 2022; 14:00	Vietnam	14–46	Bahrain	Prince Nayef Sports City Hall, Qatif; Referees: Al-Wahibi, Al-Shahi (OMA)
18 January 2022; 14:00		(5–28)		Prince Nayef Sports City Hall, Qatif; Referees: Al-Wahibi, Al-Shahi (OMA)
18 January 2022; 14:00		Report		Prince Nayef Sports City Hall, Qatif; Referees: Al-Wahibi, Al-Shahi (OMA)

19 January 2022; 12:00	Hong Kong	31–27	Vietnam	Ministry of Sports Hall, Dammam
19 January 2022; 12:00		(17–11)		Ministry of Sports Hall, Dammam
19 January 2022; 12:00		Report		Ministry of Sports Hall, Dammam

19 January 2022; 16:00	Bahrain	35–19	Uzbekistan	Ministry of Sports Hall, Dammam
19 January 2022; 16:00		(17–9)		Ministry of Sports Hall, Dammam
19 January 2022; 16:00		Report		Ministry of Sports Hall, Dammam

20 January 2022; 12:00	Vietnam	23–30	Uzbekistan	Prince Nayef Sports City Hall, Qatif
20 January 2022; 12:00		(12–12)		Prince Nayef Sports City Hall, Qatif
20 January 2022; 12:00		Report		Prince Nayef Sports City Hall, Qatif

20 January 2022; 14:00	Hong Kong	20–46	Bahrain	Prince Nayef Sports City Hall, Qatif
20 January 2022; 14:00		(8–22)		Prince Nayef Sports City Hall, Qatif
20 January 2022; 14:00		Report		Prince Nayef Sports City Hall, Qatif

== Martyr Fahad Al-Ahmad Al-Sabah Cup ==
=== Group III ===
Pos	Team	Pld	W	D	L	GF	GA	GD	Pts	Qualification
1	United Arab Emirates	3	3	0	0	72	49	+23	6	Ninth place game
2	Jordan	3	2	0	1	103	90	+13	4	Eleventh place game
3	Vietnam	3	1	0	2	67	83	−16	2	13th place game
4	India	3	0	0	3	84	104	−20	0	15th place game

Source: SAHF
Rules for classification: 1) points; 2) head-to-head points; 3) head-to-head goal difference; 4) head-to-head number of goals scored; 5) goal difference.

22 January 2022; 14:00	United Arab Emirates	31–21	India	Prince Nayef Sports City Hall, Qatif
22 January 2022; 14:00		(19–8)		Prince Nayef Sports City Hall, Qatif
22 January 2022; 14:00		Report		Prince Nayef Sports City Hall, Qatif

22 January 2022; 16:00	Vietnam	29–40	Jordan	Prince Nayef Sports City Hall, Qatif
22 January 2022; 16:00		(12–19)		Prince Nayef Sports City Hall, Qatif
22 January 2022; 16:00		Report		Prince Nayef Sports City Hall, Qatif

23 January 2022; 12:00	Vietnam	38–33	India	Ministry of Sports Hall, Dammam
23 January 2022; 12:00		(20–13)		Ministry of Sports Hall, Dammam
23 January 2022; 12:00		Report		Ministry of Sports Hall, Dammam

23 January 2022; 16:00	United Arab Emirates	31–28	Jordan	Ministry of Sports Hall, Dammam
23 January 2022; 16:00		(16–15)		Ministry of Sports Hall, Dammam
23 January 2022; 16:00		Report		Ministry of Sports Hall, Dammam

25 January 2022; 18:00	Jordan	35–30	India	Ministry of Sports Hall, Dammam
25 January 2022; 18:00		(17–13)		Ministry of Sports Hall, Dammam
25 January 2022; 18:00		Report		Ministry of Sports Hall, Dammam

Cancelled (Note: The match, originally scheduled for 25 January, could not be played due to several positive COVID-19 tests by the Vietnamese team. As a result, the game was forfeited by Vietnam and counted as a 10–0 win for the United Arab Emirates.)	United Arab Emirates	10–0	Vietnam	Ministry of Sports Hall, Dammam
Cancelled		Report		Ministry of Sports Hall, Dammam

=== Group IV ===
Pos	Team	Pld	W	D	L	GF	GA	GD	Pts	Qualification
1	Oman	3	3	0	0	74	37	+37	6	Ninth place game
2	Hong Kong	3	2	0	1	66	40	+26	4	Eleventh place game
3	Singapore	3	1	0	2	35	68	−33	2	13th place game
4	Australia	3	0	0	3	0	30	−30	0	15th place game

Source: SAHF
Rules for classification: 1) points; 2) head-to-head points; 3) head-to-head goal difference; 4) head-to-head number of goals scored; 5) goal difference.

22 January 2022; 18:00	Hong Kong	31–13	Singapore	Prince Nayef Sports City Hall, Qatif
22 January 2022; 18:00		(16–8)		Prince Nayef Sports City Hall, Qatif
22 January 2022; 18:00		Report		Prince Nayef Sports City Hall, Qatif

23 January 2022; 18:00	Oman	37–12	Singapore	Ministry of Sports Hall, Dammam
23 January 2022; 18:00		(18–4)		Ministry of Sports Hall, Dammam
23 January 2022; 18:00		Report		Ministry of Sports Hall, Dammam

25 January 2022; 12:00	Oman	27–25	Hong Kong	Ministry of Sports Hall, Dammam
25 January 2022; 12:00		(17–14)		Ministry of Sports Hall, Dammam
25 January 2022; 12:00		Report		Ministry of Sports Hall, Dammam

Cancelled (Note: The match, originally scheduled for 22 January, could not be played due to several positive COVID-19 tests by the Australian team. As a result, the game was forfeited by Australia and counted as a 10–0 win for Oman.)	Oman	10–0	Australia	Prince Nayef Sports City Hall, Qatif
Cancelled		Report		Prince Nayef Sports City Hall, Qatif

Cancelled (Note: The match, originally scheduled for 23 January, could not be played due to several positive COVID-19 tests by the Australian team. As a result, the game was forfeited by Australia and counted as a 10–0 win for Hong Kong.)	Hong Kong	10–0	Australia	Ministry of Sports Hall, Dammam
Cancelled		Report		Ministry of Sports Hall, Dammam

Cancelled (Note: The match, originally scheduled for 25 January, could not be played due to several positive COVID-19 tests by the Australian team. As a result, the game was forfeited by Australia and counted as a 10–0 win for Singapore.)	Singapore	10–0	Australia	Ministry of Sports Hall, Dammam
Cancelled		Report		Ministry of Sports Hall, Dammam

=== 15th place game ===
28 January 2022; 14:00	Australia	21–25	India	Ministry of Sports Hall, Dammam
28 January 2022; 14:00		(14–11)		Ministry of Sports Hall, Dammam
28 January 2022; 14:00		Report		Ministry of Sports Hall, Dammam

=== 13th place game ===
28 January 2022; 16:00	Singapore	20–33	Vietnam	Ministry of Sports Hall, Dammam
28 January 2022; 16:00		(11–15)		Ministry of Sports Hall, Dammam
28 January 2022; 16:00		Report		Ministry of Sports Hall, Dammam

=== Eleventh place game ===
28 January 2022; 18:00	Hong Kong	27–26	Jordan	Ministry of Sports Hall, Dammam
28 January 2022; 18:00		(11–15)		Ministry of Sports Hall, Dammam
28 January 2022; 18:00		Report		Ministry of Sports Hall, Dammam

=== Ninth place game ===
28 January 2022; 20:00	Oman	24–27	United Arab Emirates	Ministry of Sports Hall, Dammam
28 January 2022; 20:00		(10–11)		Ministry of Sports Hall, Dammam
28 January 2022; 20:00		Report		Ministry of Sports Hall, Dammam

== Main round ==
=== Group I ===
Pos	Team	Pld	W	D	L	GF	GA	GD	Pts	Qualification
1	Qatar	3	3	0	0	90	34	+56	6	Semifinals
2	Saudi Arabia (H)	3	2	0	1	77	80	−3	4	Semifinals
3	South Korea	3	1	0	2	53	58	−5	2	Fifth place game
4	Uzbekistan	3	0	0	3	60	108	−48	0	Seventh place game

Source: SAHF
Rules for classification: 1) points; 2) head-to-head points; 3) head-to-head goal difference; 4) head-to-head number of goals scored; 5) goal difference.
(H) Hosts

22 January 2022; 14:00	Uzbekistan	21–31	South Korea	Ministry of Sports Hall, Dammam
22 January 2022; 14:00		(11–13)		Ministry of Sports Hall, Dammam
22 January 2022; 14:00		Report		Ministry of Sports Hall, Dammam

22 January 2022; 18:00	Qatar	34–19	Saudi Arabia	Ministry of Sports Hall, Dammam; Referees: Bíró, Kiss (HUN)
22 January 2022; 18:00		(17–10)		Ministry of Sports Hall, Dammam; Referees: Bíró, Kiss (HUN)
22 January 2022; 18:00		Report		Ministry of Sports Hall, Dammam; Referees: Bíró, Kiss (HUN)

24 January 2022; 12:00	Qatar	46–15	Uzbekistan	Ministry of Sports Hall, Dammam; Referees: Hussein, Imran (IRQ)
24 January 2022; 12:00		(28–7)		Ministry of Sports Hall, Dammam; Referees: Hussein, Imran (IRQ)
24 January 2022; 12:00		Report		Ministry of Sports Hall, Dammam; Referees: Hussein, Imran (IRQ)

24 January 2022; 18:00	South Korea	22–27	Saudi Arabia	Ministry of Sports Hall, Dammam; Referees: Gasmi, Gasmi (FRA)
24 January 2022; 18:00	Jang 6	(10–13)	Mu. Al-Salem 11	Ministry of Sports Hall, Dammam; Referees: Gasmi, Gasmi (FRA)
24 January 2022; 18:00	1× (yellow card) 2× (suspension)	Report	1× (yellow card) 3× (suspension)	Ministry of Sports Hall, Dammam; Referees: Gasmi, Gasmi (FRA)

26 January 2022; 18:00	Uzbekistan	24–31	Saudi Arabia	Ministry of Sports Hall, Dammam; Referees: Al-Wahibi, Al-Shahi (OMA)
26 January 2022; 18:00		(11–16)		Ministry of Sports Hall, Dammam; Referees: Al-Wahibi, Al-Shahi (OMA)
26 January 2022; 18:00		Report		Ministry of Sports Hall, Dammam; Referees: Al-Wahibi, Al-Shahi (OMA)

Cancelled (Note: The match, originally scheduled for 26 January, could not be played due to several positive COVID-19 tests by the South Korean team. As a result, the game was forfeited by South Korea and counted as a 10–0 win for Qatar.)	Qatar	10–0	South Korea	Ministry of Sports Hall, Dammam; Referees: Hussein, Imran (IRQ)
Cancelled		Report		Ministry of Sports Hall, Dammam; Referees: Hussein, Imran (IRQ)

=== Group II ===
Pos	Team	Pld	W	D	L	GF	GA	GD	Pts	Qualification
1	Bahrain	3	3	0	0	99	72	+27	6	Semifinals
2	Iran	3	2	0	1	81	87	−6	4	Semifinals
3	Iraq	3	0	1	2	81	87	−6	1	Fifth place game
4	Kuwait	3	0	1	2	66	81	−15	1	Seventh place game

Source: SAHF
Rules for classification: 1) points; 2) head-to-head points; 3) head-to-head goal difference; 4) head-to-head number of goals scored; 5) goal difference.

22 January 2022; 12:00	Iraq	25–28	Iran	Ministry of Sports Hall, Dammam; Referees: Lee, Koo (KOR)
22 January 2022; 12:00		(12–16)		Ministry of Sports Hall, Dammam; Referees: Lee, Koo (KOR)
22 January 2022; 12:00		Report		Ministry of Sports Hall, Dammam; Referees: Lee, Koo (KOR)

22 January 2022; 16:00	Bahrain	29–15	Kuwait	Ministry of Sports Hall, Dammam; Referees: Gasmi, Gasmi (FRA)
22 January 2022; 16:00		(17–8)		Ministry of Sports Hall, Dammam; Referees: Gasmi, Gasmi (FRA)
22 January 2022; 16:00		Report		Ministry of Sports Hall, Dammam; Referees: Gasmi, Gasmi (FRA)

24 January 2022; 14:00	Kuwait	26–27	Iran	Ministry of Sports Hall, Dammam; Referees: Bíró, Kiss (HUN)
24 January 2022; 14:00		(11–11)		Ministry of Sports Hall, Dammam; Referees: Bíró, Kiss (HUN)
24 January 2022; 14:00		Report		Ministry of Sports Hall, Dammam; Referees: Bíró, Kiss (HUN)

24 January 2022; 16:00	Iraq	31–34	Bahrain	Ministry of Sports Hall, Dammam; Referees: Kim, Park (KOR)
24 January 2022; 16:00		(15–18)		Ministry of Sports Hall, Dammam; Referees: Kim, Park (KOR)
24 January 2022; 16:00		Report		Ministry of Sports Hall, Dammam; Referees: Kim, Park (KOR)

26 January 2022; 12:00	Iraq	25–25	Kuwait	Ministry of Sports Hall, Dammam; Referees: Bíró, Kiss (HUN)
26 January 2022; 12:00		(7–14)		Ministry of Sports Hall, Dammam; Referees: Bíró, Kiss (HUN)
26 January 2022; 12:00		Report		Ministry of Sports Hall, Dammam; Referees: Bíró, Kiss (HUN)

26 January 2022; 16:00	Bahrain	36–26	Iran	Ministry of Sports Hall, Dammam; Referees: Gasmi, Gasmi (FRA)
26 January 2022; 16:00		(19–10)		Ministry of Sports Hall, Dammam; Referees: Gasmi, Gasmi (FRA)
26 January 2022; 16:00		Report		Ministry of Sports Hall, Dammam; Referees: Gasmi, Gasmi (FRA)

== Final round ==
=== Bracket ===
Semi-finals
29 January
Qatar	34
Iran	19
29 January
Bahrain	29
Saudi Arabia	20

Final
31 January
Qatar	29
Bahrain	24
Third place
31 January
Iran	23
Saudi Arabia	26

=== Semifinals ===
29 January 2022; 16:00	Qatar	34–19	Iran	Ministry of Sports Hall, Dammam; Referees: Lee, Koo (KOR)
29 January 2022; 16:00	Carol 7	(20–10)	Asari, Sadeghi 5	Ministry of Sports Hall, Dammam; Referees: Lee, Koo (KOR)
29 January 2022; 16:00	1× (suspension)	Report	3× (suspension)	Ministry of Sports Hall, Dammam; Referees: Lee, Koo (KOR)

29 January 2022; 18:00	Bahrain	29–20	Saudi Arabia	Ministry of Sports Hall, Dammam; Referees: Gasmi, Gasmi (FRA)
29 January 2022; 18:00	Al-Sayyad 6	(16–9)	Al-Saffar 6	Ministry of Sports Hall, Dammam; Referees: Gasmi, Gasmi (FRA)
29 January 2022; 18:00	2× (yellow card) 6× (suspension)	Report	7× (suspension) 1× (red card)	Ministry of Sports Hall, Dammam; Referees: Gasmi, Gasmi (FRA)

=== Seventh place game ===
30 January 2022; 16:00	Uzbekistan	30–32	Kuwait	Ministry of Sports Hall, Dammam; Referees: Gheisaran, Gheisaran (IRI)
30 January 2022; 16:00	Ignatenko 8	(16–17)	Al-Harbi 15	Ministry of Sports Hall, Dammam; Referees: Gheisaran, Gheisaran (IRI)
30 January 2022; 16:00	4× (suspension)	Report	2× (yellow card) 6× (suspension) 1× (red card)	Ministry of Sports Hall, Dammam; Referees: Gheisaran, Gheisaran (IRI)

=== Fifth place game ===
30 January 2022; 18:00	South Korea	26–24	Iraq	Ministry of Sports Hall, Dammam; Referees: Gasmi, Gasmi (FRA)
30 January 2022; 18:00	Kang 6	(13–11)	Ghassab, Hammoodi 7	Ministry of Sports Hall, Dammam; Referees: Gasmi, Gasmi (FRA)
30 January 2022; 18:00		Report	2× (yellow card) 5× (suspension)	Ministry of Sports Hall, Dammam; Referees: Gasmi, Gasmi (FRA)

=== Third place game ===
31 January 2022; 16:00	Iran	23–26	Saudi Arabia	Ministry of Sports Hall, Dammam; Referees: Hussein, Imran (IRQ)
31 January 2022; 16:00	three players 4	(12–15)	Al-Obaidi 9	Ministry of Sports Hall, Dammam; Referees: Hussein, Imran (IRQ)
31 January 2022; 16:00	3× (suspension) 1× (red card)	Report	1× (yellow card) 4× (suspension)	Ministry of Sports Hall, Dammam; Referees: Hussein, Imran (IRQ)

=== Final ===
31 January 2022; 18:00	Qatar	29–24	Bahrain	Ministry of Sports Hall, Dammam; Referees: Bíró, Kiss (HUN)
31 January 2022; 18:00	Carol 8	(14–11)	Habib, Jalal 5	Ministry of Sports Hall, Dammam; Referees: Bíró, Kiss (HUN)
31 January 2022; 18:00	2× (yellow card) 3× (suspension) 1× (red card)	Report	1× (yellow card) 3× (suspension)	Ministry of Sports Hall, Dammam; Referees: Bíró, Kiss (HUN)

== Final ranking ==
Rank	Team
1st place, gold medalist(s)	Qatar
2nd place, silver medalist(s)	Bahrain
3rd place, bronze medalist(s)	Saudi Arabia
4	Iran
5	South Korea
6	Iraq
7	Kuwait
8	Uzbekistan
9	United Arab Emirates
10	Oman
11	Hong Kong
12	Jordan
13	Vietnam
14	Singapore
15	India
16	Australia

Qualified for the 2023 World Men's Handball Championship
