= Uzbekistan men's national handball team =

Uzbekistan

Information
- Association: Handball Federation of Uzbekistan

Colours
1st	2nd

Results

Asian Championship
- Appearances: 4 (First in 2012)
- Best result: 10th (2012, 2018)
- Last updated on Unknown.

The Uzbekistan men's national handball team is the national team of Uzbekistan. It is governed by the Handball Federation of Uzbekistan and takes part in international team handball competitions.

== Records ==
=== Olympic Games ===
- Handball at the 2012 Summer Olympics – Asian men's qualification tournament
- Handball at the 2016 Summer Olympics – Asian men's qualification tournament

=== Asian Championship ===
Year	Rank	P	W	D	L	GF	GA	GD
1977 Kuwait	did not enter							
1979 China	did not enter							
1983 South Korea	did not enter							
1987 Jordan	did not enter							
1989 China	did not enter							
1991 Japan	did not enter							
1993 Bahrain	did not enter							
1995 Kuwait	did not enter							
2000 Japan	did not enter							
2002 Iran	did not enter							
2004 Qatar	did not enter							
2006 Thailand	did not enter							
2008 Iran	did not enter							
2010 Lebanon	did not enter							
2012 Saudi Arabia	10	5	0	0	5	98	212	–114
2014 Bahrain	12	7	0	0	7	118	266	–148
2016 Bahrain	did not enter							
2018 South Korea	10	5	2	0	3	128	153	–25
2020 Kuwait	did not enter							
2022 Saudi Arabia	8	7	2	0	5	167	222	–55
Total	4/20	24	4	0	20	511	853	–342

=== Asian Games ===
Year	Rank	P	W	D	L	GF	GA	GD	Points
1982 India	Did Not Enter								
1986 South Korea	Did Not Enter								
1990 China	Did Not Enter								
1994 Japan	Did Not Enter								
1998 Thailand	Did Not Enter								
2002 South Korea	Did Not Enter								
2006 Qatar	14	5	1	0	4	158	223	67	2
2010 China	Did Not Enter								
2014 South Korea	Did Not Enter								
2018 Indonesia	Did Not Enter								
2022 China	12	2	0	0	2	52	78	26	0
2026 Japan	Did Not Enter								
Total	2/12	7	1	0	6	210	301	93	2

== Results ==
Number	Year	Opponent	Result
Handball at the 2006 Asian Games – Men
1	2006	Japan	30-56 L
2	2006	United Arab Emirates	27-46 L
3	2006	Saudi Arabia	23-51 L
4	2006	Macau	46-35 W
5	2006	Hong Kong	32-35 L
2012 Asian Men's Handball Championship
6	2012	United Arab Emirates	20-40 L
7	2012	Qatar	19-41 L
8	2012	Saudi Arabia	14-47 L
9	2012	Bahrain	15-52 L
10	2012	Jordan	30-32 L
2014 Asian Men's Handball Championship
11	2014	Saudi Arabia	21-43 L
12	2014	Bahrain	22-47 L
13	2014	South Korea	19-32 L
14	2014	Iran	22-54 L
15	2014	China	22-39 L
16	2014	Japan	12-41 L
17	2014	China	0-10 L
2018 Asian Men's Handball Championship
18	2018	Japan	27-38 L
19	2018	Iran	18-37 L
20	2018	New Zealand	33-19 W
21	2018	India	29-27 W
22	2018	China	21-32 L
