= 2014 Asian Men's Handball Championship =

Season of the Asian Men's Handball Championship

2014 Asian Championship

Tournament details
- Host country: Bahrain
- Venues: 2 (in 2 host cities)
- Dates: 25 January – 6 February
- Teams: 12 (from 1 confederation)

Final positions
- Champions: Qatar (1st title)
- Runners-up: Bahrain
- Third place: Iran
- Fourth place: United Arab Emirates

Tournament statistics
- Matches played: 42
- Goals scored: 2,204 (52.48 per match)

The 2014 Asian Men's Handball Championship was the 16th edition of the Asian Men's Handball Championship, held in Isa Town and Manama, Bahrain, from 25 January to 6 February 2014. It acted as the Asian qualifying tournament for the 2015 World Men's Handball Championship in Qatar.

Qatar won their first title by defeating the hosts Bahrain 26–27 in the final.

== Draw ==
Group A	Group B
South Korea; Saudi Arabia; Iran; Uzbekistan; China; Bahrain	Qatar; Japan; United Arab Emirates; Kuwait; Iraq; Oman

== Preliminary round ==
All times are local (UTC+3).

=== Group A ===
Team	Pld	W	D	L	GF	GA	GD	Pts
Bahrain (H)	5	4	1	0	157	113	+44	9
Iran	5	2	3	0	164	125	+39	7
South Korea	5	3	1	1	137	110	+27	7
Saudi Arabia	5	2	1	2	130	113	+17	5
China	5	1	0	4	125	143	−18	2
Uzbekistan	5	0	0	5	106	215	−109	0

(H) Hosts

25 January 2014; 13:00	Uzbekistan	21–43	Saudi Arabia	Khalifa Sports City Hall, Isa Town
25 January 2014; 13:00		(14–21)		Khalifa Sports City Hall, Isa Town

25 January 2014; 15:00	Iran	24–24	South Korea	Khalifa Sports City Hall, Isa Town
25 January 2014; 15:00		(12–11)		Khalifa Sports City Hall, Isa Town

25 January 2014; 19:00	China	22–32	Bahrain	Khalifa Sports City Hall, Isa Town
25 January 2014; 19:00		(12–14)		Khalifa Sports City Hall, Isa Town

27 January 2014; 15:00	Saudi Arabia	22–22	Iran	Khalifa Sports City Hall, Isa Town
27 January 2014; 15:00		(12–10)		Khalifa Sports City Hall, Isa Town

27 January 2014; 17:00	China	17–28	South Korea	Khalifa Sports City Hall, Isa Town
27 January 2014; 17:00		(9–14)		Khalifa Sports City Hall, Isa Town

27 January 2014; 19:00	Uzbekistan	22–47	Bahrain	Khalifa Sports City Hall, Isa Town
27 January 2014; 19:00		(8–23)		Khalifa Sports City Hall, Isa Town

29 January 2014; 15:00	South Korea	32–19	Uzbekistan	Khalifa Sports City Hall, Isa Town
29 January 2014; 15:00		(15–9)		Khalifa Sports City Hall, Isa Town

29 January 2014; 17:00	Iran	34–27	China	Khalifa Sports City Hall, Isa Town
29 January 2014; 17:00		(16–12)		Khalifa Sports City Hall, Isa Town

29 January 2014; 19:00	Bahrain	22–14	Saudi Arabia	Khalifa Sports City Hall, Isa Town
29 January 2014; 19:00		(12–8)		Khalifa Sports City Hall, Isa Town

31 January 2014; 15:00	Iran	54–22	Uzbekistan	Khalifa Sports City Hall, Isa Town
31 January 2014; 15:00		(24–12)		Khalifa Sports City Hall, Isa Town

31 January 2014; 17:00	Saudi Arabia	27–20	China	Khalifa Sports City Hall, Isa Town
31 January 2014; 17:00		(14–10)		Khalifa Sports City Hall, Isa Town

31 January 2014; 19:00	South Korea	25–26	Bahrain	Khalifa Sports City Hall, Isa Town
31 January 2014; 19:00		(14–15)		Khalifa Sports City Hall, Isa Town

2 February 2014; 15:00	Uzbekistan	22–39	China	Khalifa Sports City Hall, Isa Town
2 February 2014; 15:00		(12–16)		Khalifa Sports City Hall, Isa Town

2 February 2014; 17:00	South Korea	28–24	Saudi Arabia	Khalifa Sports City Hall, Isa Town
2 February 2014; 17:00		(11–12)		Khalifa Sports City Hall, Isa Town

2 February 2014; 19:00	Bahrain	30–30	Iran	Khalifa Sports City Hall, Isa Town
2 February 2014; 19:00		(17–14)		Khalifa Sports City Hall, Isa Town

=== Group B ===
Team	Pld	W	D	L	GF	GA	GD	Pts
Qatar	5	5	0	0	164	87	+77	10
United Arab Emirates	5	3	0	2	116	131	−15	6
Kuwait	5	3	0	2	142	139	+3	6
Oman	5	2	0	3	126	142	−16	4
Japan	5	2	0	3	140	132	+8	4
Iraq	5	0	0	5	102	159	−57	0

26 January 2014; 15:00	Kuwait	28–26	Japan	Khalifa Sports City Hall, Isa Town
26 January 2014; 15:00		(14–16)		Khalifa Sports City Hall, Isa Town

26 January 2014; 17:00	United Arab Emirates	14–31	Qatar	Khalifa Sports City Hall, Isa Town
26 January 2014; 17:00		(7–17)		Khalifa Sports City Hall, Isa Town

26 January 2014; 19:00	Iraq	24–33	Oman	Khalifa Sports City Hall, Isa Town
26 January 2014; 19:00		(13–19)		Khalifa Sports City Hall, Isa Town

28 January 2014; 15:00	Japan	35–26	United Arab Emirates	Khalifa Sports City Hall, Isa Town
28 January 2014; 15:00		(16–11)		Khalifa Sports City Hall, Isa Town

28 January 2014; 17:00	Iraq	11–40	Qatar	Khalifa Sports City Hall, Isa Town
28 January 2014; 17:00		(6–18)		Khalifa Sports City Hall, Isa Town

28 January 2014; 19:00	Kuwait	40–31	Oman	Khalifa Sports City Hall, Isa Town
28 January 2014; 19:00		(20–14)		Khalifa Sports City Hall, Isa Town

30 January 2014; 15:00	United Arab Emirates	26–17	Iraq	Khalifa Sports City Hall, Isa Town
30 January 2014; 15:00		(8–4)		Khalifa Sports City Hall, Isa Town

30 January 2014; 17:00	Oman	23–22	Japan	Khalifa Sports City Hall, Isa Town
30 January 2014; 17:00		(8–11)		Khalifa Sports City Hall, Isa Town

30 January 2014; 19:00	Qatar	31–23	Kuwait	Khalifa Sports City Hall, Isa Town
30 January 2014; 19:00		(14–14)		Khalifa Sports City Hall, Isa Town

1 February 2014; 15:00	United Arab Emirates	23–22	Kuwait	Khalifa Sports City Hall, Isa Town
1 February 2014; 15:00		(10–13)		Khalifa Sports City Hall, Isa Town

1 February 2014; 17:00	Japan	31–22	Iraq	Khalifa Sports City Hall, Isa Town
1 February 2014; 17:00		(16–10)		Khalifa Sports City Hall, Isa Town

1 February 2014; 19:00	Qatar	29–13	Oman	Khalifa Sports City Hall, Isa Town
1 February 2014; 19:00		(15–7)		Khalifa Sports City Hall, Isa Town

3 February 2014; 15:00	Oman	26–27	United Arab Emirates	Khalifa Sports City Hall, Isa Town
3 February 2014; 15:00		(12–13)		Khalifa Sports City Hall, Isa Town

3 February 2014; 17:00	Kuwait	29–28	Iraq	Khalifa Sports City Hall, Isa Town
3 February 2014; 17:00		(12–15)		Khalifa Sports City Hall, Isa Town

3 February 2014; 19:00	Qatar	33–26	Japan	Khalifa Sports City Hall, Isa Town
3 February 2014; 19:00		(15–15)		Khalifa Sports City Hall, Isa Town

== Placement 9th–12th ==
Semifinals
4 February – Manama
China	25
Iraq	30
4 February – Manama
Japan	41
Uzbekistan	12

9th/10th
5 February – Isa Town
Iraq	20
Japan	28
11th/12th
5 February – Isa Town
China	10
Uzbekistan	0

=== 9th–12th semifinals ===
4 February 2014; 13:00	China	25–30	Iraq	Bahrain Handball Federation Hall, Manama
4 February 2014; 13:00		(11–16)		Bahrain Handball Federation Hall, Manama

4 February 2014; 15:00	Japan	41–12	Uzbekistan	Bahrain Handball Federation Hall, Manama
4 February 2014; 15:00		(18–7)		Bahrain Handball Federation Hall, Manama

=== 11th/12th ===
5 February 2014; 13:00	China	10–0	Uzbekistan	Khalifa Sports City Hall, Isa Town
5 February 2014; 13:00		(Walkover)		Khalifa Sports City Hall, Isa Town

=== 9th/10th ===
5 February 2014; 15:00	Iraq	20–28	Japan	Khalifa Sports City Hall, Isa Town
5 February 2014; 15:00		(11–17)		Khalifa Sports City Hall, Isa Town

== Placement 5th–8th ==
Semifinals
4 February – Manama
South Korea	32
Oman	18
4 February – Manama
Kuwait	30
Saudi Arabia	36

5th/6th
5 February – Isa Town
South Korea	30
Saudi Arabia	25
7th/8th
5 February – Isa Town
Oman	26
Kuwait	35

=== 5th–8ths semifinals ===
4 February 2014; 17:00	South Korea	32–18	Oman	Bahrain Handball Federation Hall, Manama
4 February 2014; 17:00		(12–10)		Bahrain Handball Federation Hall, Manama

4 February 2014; 19:00	Kuwait	30–36	Saudi Arabia	Bahrain Handball Federation Hall, Manama
4 February 2014; 19:00		(18–16)		Bahrain Handball Federation Hall, Manama

=== 7th/8th ===
5 February 2014; 17:00	Oman	26–35	Kuwait	Khalifa Sports City Hall, Isa Town
5 February 2014; 17:00		(9–16)		Khalifa Sports City Hall, Isa Town

=== 5th/6th ===
5 February 2014; 19:00	South Korea	30–25	Saudi Arabia	Khalifa Sports City Hall, Isa Town
5 February 2014; 19:00		(15–15)		Khalifa Sports City Hall, Isa Town

== Final round ==
Semifinals
4 February – Isa Town
Bahrain	27
United Arab Emirates	20
4 February – Isa Town
Qatar	23
Iran	22

Gold medal match
6 February – Isa Town
Bahrain	26
Qatar	27
Bronze medal match
6 February – Isa Town
United Arab Emirates	23
Iran	29

=== Semifinals ===
4 February 2014; 16:30	Qatar	23–22	Iran	Khalifa Sports City Hall, Isa Town
4 February 2014; 16:30		(12–11)		Khalifa Sports City Hall, Isa Town

4 February 2014; 19:00	Bahrain	27–20	United Arab Emirates	Khalifa Sports City Hall, Isa Town
4 February 2014; 19:00		(15–8)		Khalifa Sports City Hall, Isa Town

=== Bronze medal match ===
6 February 2014; 16:30	United Arab Emirates	23–29	Iran	Khalifa Sports City Hall, Isa Town
6 February 2014; 16:30		(10–11)		Khalifa Sports City Hall, Isa Town

=== Gold medal match ===
6 February 2014; 19:00	Bahrain	26–27	Qatar	Khalifa Sports City Hall, Isa Town
6 February 2014; 19:00		(14–14)		Khalifa Sports City Hall, Isa Town

== Final standing ==
Rank	Team
1st place, gold medalist(s)	Qatar
2nd place, silver medalist(s)	Bahrain
3rd place, bronze medalist(s)	Iran
4	United Arab Emirates
5	South Korea
6	Saudi Arabia
7	Kuwait
8	Oman
9	Japan
10	Iraq
11	China
12	Uzbekistan

Team qualified for the 2015 World Championship

== Squads of the teams on the podium ==
Squads of the teams on the podium are:

Asian winner: Qatar

- 1 – Hamdi Missaoui
- 4 – Hassan Mabrouk
- 5 – Mustafa Alsaltialkrad
- 6 – Nasreddine Megdic
- 7 – Youssef Benali
- 8 – Wajdi Sinen
- 9 – Rafael Capote
- 10 – Abdulaziz Alshammari
- 11 – Abdulrazzaq Murad
- 13 – Eldar Memisevic
- 16 – Goran Stojanovic
- 19 – Borja Vidal
- 20 – Kamalaldin Mallash
- 39 – Selvedin Omahic
- 77 – Hadi Hamdoon
- ?? – Bertrand Roiné

Head coach:

- Valero Rivera

Asian runner-up: Bahrain

- 3 – Ali Eid
- 7 – Ali Merza
- 9 – Hasan Al-Samahiji
- 10 – Jaafar Abdulqader
- 11 – Sadiq Ali
- 14 – Mahmood Abdulqader
- 15 – Mahdi Madan
- 17 – Ali Husain
- 19 – Mohamed Merza
- 22 – Salah Abduljalil
- 27 – Bilal Basham Askani
- 51 – Mohamed Al-Maqabi
- 71 – Jasim Al-Salatna
- 93 – Mohamed Habib
- 99 – Husain Al-Sayyad

Head coach:

- ?

Bronze medallists: Iran

- 2 – Mojtaba Heidarpour
- 3 – Mohammad Reza Rajabi
- 4 – Milad Masaeli
- 6 – Sajjad Esteki
- 7 – Aliakbar Khosnevis Zarch
- 8 – Sayedlireza Mirzamani
- 9 – Mehdi Bijari
- 10 – Rahim Momenizadeh
- 11 – Allahkaram Esteki
- 16 – Mohammad Shahenayati
- 17 – Hadi Talebi
- 18 – Hassan Valiabad
- 23 – Saeid Heidarirad
- 30 – Sajjad Nadri
- 33 – Mehrdad Samsami
- 89 – Saeid Barkhordari

Head coach:

- Rafael Guijosa
