= Asian Men's Junior Handball Championship =

Handball championship in Asia

AHF Asian Men's Junior Handball Championship
- Current season, competition or edition: 2026 Asian Men's Junior Handball Championship
- Sport: Handball
- Founder: Asian Handball Federation
- First season: 1988
- Confederation: Asia
- Most recent champion: South Korea (4th title)
- Most titles: Kuwait; Qatar (5 titles each)
- Related competitions: Asian Women's Junior Handball Championship

The Asian Men's Junior Handball Championship is the official competition organised by Asian Handball Federation for junior men's national handball teams of Asia, and takes place every two years.

In addition to crowning the Asian champions, the tournament also serves as a qualifying tournament for the IHF Men's Junior World Championship.

== Summary ==
Year	Host	Final			Third place match		
Year	Host	Champion	Score	Runner-up	Third place	Score	Fourth place
1988; Details	(Syria); Damascus	South Korea		Kuwait	Syria		Chinese Taipei
1990; Details	(Iran); Tehran	China		South Korea	Syria		Japan
1992; Details	(China); Beijing	South Korea		Kuwait	Japan		Chinese Taipei
1994; Details	(Syria); Hama	Qatar		Bahrain	Saudi Arabia		South Korea
1996; Details	(United Arab Emirates); Dubai	United Arab Emirates	No playoffs	Saudi Arabia	Qatar	No playoffs	South Korea
1998; Details	(Bahrain); Manama	Bahrain	24–17	Saudi Arabia	Kuwait	25–20	China
2000; Details	(Iran); Mashhad	Kuwait	25–22	Qatar	South Korea		Bahrain
2002; Details	(Thailand); Bangkok	Kuwait	23–21	Qatar	South Korea	48–40	United Arab Emirates
2004; Details	(India); Hyderabad	Kuwait	26–24	South Korea	Iran	24–19	Japan
2006; Details	(Japan); Hiroshima	Kuwait	34–28	South Korea	Saudi Arabia	40–26	China
2008; Details	(Jordan); Amman	Kuwait	31–30	Iran	Qatar	42–38	South Korea
2010; Details	(Iran); Tehran	Qatar	32–27	South Korea	Iran	37–34	United Arab Emirates
2012; Details	(Qatar); Doha	Qatar	25–22	South Korea	Kuwait	30–28 OT	Saudi Arabia
2014; Details	(Iran); Tabriz	Qatar	29–28 OT	South Korea	Japan	33–32	Iran
2016; Details	(Jordan); Amman	Qatar	23–16	Saudi Arabia	South Korea	33–29	Japan
2018; Details	(Oman); Salalah	South Korea	27–25 OT	Japan	Bahrain	29–28	Saudi Arabia
2022; Details	(Bahrain); Isa Town	Japan	24–20	Bahrain	Kuwait	27–21	Saudi Arabia
2024; Details	(Jordan); Amman	Japan	32–27	South Korea	Bahrain	28–25	Saudi Arabia
2026; Details	(China); Chuzhou	South Korea	25–24	United Arab Emirates	Saudi Arabia	37–27	Bahrain

== Medal table ==
Rank	Nation	Gold	Silver	Bronze	Total
1	Kuwait	5	2	3	10
2	Qatar	5	2	2	9
3	South Korea	4	7	3	14
4	Japan	2	1	2	5
5	Bahrain	1	2	2	5
6	United Arab Emirates	1	1	0	2
7	China	1	0	0	1
8	Saudi Arabia	0	3	3	6
9	Iran	0	1	2	3
10	Syria	0	0	2	2
Totals (10 entries)		19	19	19	57

== Participating nations ==
Nation	(Syria) 1988	(Iran) 1990	(China) 1992	(Syria) 1994	(United Arab Emirates) 1996	(Bahrain) 1998	(Iran) 2000	(Thailand) 2002	(India) 2004	(Japan) 2006	(Jordan) 2008	(Iran) 2010	(Qatar) 2012	(Iran) 2014	(Jordan) 2016	(Oman) 2018	(Bahrain) 2022	(Jordan) 2024	(China) 2026	Years
Bahrain				2nd	5th	1st	4th				7th	6th	7th	9th	6th	3rd	2nd	3rd	4th	13
Bangladesh									11th											1
China		1st	5th	9th	9th	4th	8th	7th	9th	4th	9th				9th	9th		9th	8th	14
Chinese Taipei	4th	6th	4th			7th	6th	6th	8th	9th			9th			10th		10th	6th	12
Hong Kong										11th	11th		11th					13th	12th	5
India		8th					10th		10th	8th	12th				11th	11th	8th	12th	13th	10
Iran	9th	5th			8th		5th		3rd	6th	2nd	3rd	6th	4th	7th	5th	6th	5th	7th	15
Iraq											13th		10th	8th	5th	6th				5
Japan	7th	4th	3rd	5th	6th	10th	7th	5th	4th	5th	8th	5th	5th	3rd	4th	2nd	1st	1st	11th	19
Jordan											5th				8th			7th		3
Kuwait	2nd		2nd	8th	10th	3rd	1st	1st	1st	1st	1st		3rd	6th			3rd	6th	5th	15
Lebanon													13th			12th				2
Macau							11th			10th			14th							3
Oman					7th	6th	9th		6th					11th		8th		8th	10th	8
Pakistan																	7th			1
Palestine	8th														12th					2
Qatar	5th	7th	6th	1st	3rd	9th	2nd	2nd	5th	7th	3rd	1st	1st	1st	1st	7th		11th	9th	18
Saudi Arabia				3rd	2nd	2nd				3rd	6th		4th	5th	2nd	4th	4th	4th	3rd	12
South Korea	1st	2nd	1st	4th	4th	5th	3rd	3rd	2nd	2nd	4th	2nd	2nd	2nd	3rd	1st	5th	2nd	1st	19
Syria	3rd	3rd		7th								7th		7th		13th				6
Thailand								8th												1
United Arab Emirates	6th			6th	1st	8th		4th	7th		10th	4th	8th						2nd	10
Uzbekistan													12th	10th	10th					3
Yemen																14th				1
Total	9	8	6	9	10	10	11	8	11	11	13	7	14	11	12	14	8	13	13	

== See also ==
- Asian Men's Handball Championship
- Asian Men's Youth Handball Championship
- Asian Women's Handball Championship
- Asian Women's Junior Handball Championship
- Asian Women's Youth Handball Championship
