= 2000 Asian Men's Junior Handball Championship =

2000 handball championship in Asia

2000 Asian Junior Championship
Tournament details
- Host country: Iran
- Venue(s): 1 (in 1 host city)
- Dates: 30 August – 8 September 2000
- Teams: 11

Final positions
- Champions: Kuwait (1st title)
- Runner-up: Qatar
- Third place: South Korea
- Fourth place: Bahrain

Tournament statistics
- Matches played: 32

The 2000 Asian Men's Junior Handball Championship (7th tournament) took place in Mashhad from 30 August–8 September. It acts as the Asian qualifying tournament for the 2001 Men's Junior World Handball Championship.

== Draw ==
Group A	Group B
Japan; Kuwait; Qatar; Iran; Oman	South Korea; China; Chinese Taipei; Bahrain; India; Macau

== Preliminary round ==
=== Group A ===
Team	Pld	W	D	L	GF	GA	GD	Pts
Kuwait	4	3	0	1	-	-	—	6
Qatar	4	3	0	1	-	-	—	6
Iran	4	2	1	1	-	-	—	5
Japan	4	1	1	2	104	118	−14	3
Oman	4	0	0	4	-	-	—	0

30 August 2000; 9:30	Kuwait	–	Oman	Beheshti Arena, Mashhad

30 August 2000; 17:30	Iran	28–28	Japan	Beheshti Arena, Mashhad
30 August 2000; 17:30		(13–16)		Beheshti Arena, Mashhad

31 August 2000; 16:00	Kuwait	33–22	Japan	Beheshti Arena, Mashhad
31 August 2000; 16:00		(17–11)		Beheshti Arena, Mashhad

31 August 2000; 17:30	Oman	–	Qatar	Beheshti Arena, Mashhad

1 September 2000; 17:30	Iran	15–19	Qatar	Beheshti Arena, Mashhad
1 September 2000; 17:30		(10–8)		Beheshti Arena, Mashhad

1 September 2000; 19:00	Oman	29–33	Japan	Beheshti Arena, Mashhad
1 September 2000; 19:00		(9–15)		Beheshti Arena, Mashhad

3 September 2000; 11:30	Kuwait	–	Qatar	Beheshti Arena, Mashhad

3 September 2000; 17:30	Iran	–	Oman	Beheshti Arena, Mashhad

4 September 2000; 9:30	Japan	21–28	Qatar	Beheshti Arena, Mashhad
4 September 2000; 9:30		(13–14)		Beheshti Arena, Mashhad

4 September 2000; 17:30	Kuwait	–	Iran	Beheshti Arena, Mashhad

=== Group B ===
Team	Pld	W	D	L	GF	GA	GD	Pts
Bahrain	5	5	0	0	-	-	—	10
South Korea	5	4	0	1	-	-	—	8
Chinese Taipei	5	3	0	2	-	-	—	6
China	5	2	0	3	-	-	—	4
India	5	1	0	4	-	-	—	2
Macau	5	0	0	5	-	-	—	0

30 August 2000; 11:30	Bahrain	–	India	Beheshti Arena, Mashhad

30 August 2000; 14:45	South Korea	–	China	Beheshti Arena, Mashhad

30 August 2000; 19:30	Macau	–	Chinese Taipei	Beheshti Arena, Mashhad

31 August 2000; 9:30	India	–	South Korea	Beheshti Arena, Mashhad

31 August 2000; 11:30	China	–	Macau	Beheshti Arena, Mashhad

31 August 2000; 19:00	Chinese Taipei	–	Bahrain	Beheshti Arena, Mashhad

1 September 2000; 9:30	South Korea	–	Macau	Beheshti Arena, Mashhad

1 September 2000; 11:30	India	–	Chinese Taipei	Beheshti Arena, Mashhad

1 September 2000; 16:00	Bahrain	–	China	Beheshti Arena, Mashhad

3 September 2000; 9:30	Macau	–	Bahrain	Beheshti Arena, Mashhad

3 September 2000; 16:00	India	–	China	Beheshti Arena, Mashhad

3 September 2000; 19:00	South Korea	–	Chinese Taipei	Beheshti Arena, Mashhad

4 September 2000; 11:30	Chinese Taipei	–	China	Beheshti Arena, Mashhad

4 September 2000; 16:00	Macau	–	India	Beheshti Arena, Mashhad

4 September 2000; 19:00	Bahrain	–	South Korea	Beheshti Arena, Mashhad

== Placement 5th–10th ==
=== 9th/10th ===
7 September 2000; 15:00	Oman	–	India	Beheshti Arena, Mashhad

=== 7th/8th ===
7 September 2000; 17:00	Japan	40–36	China	Beheshti Arena, Mashhad
7 September 2000; 17:00		(20–18)		Beheshti Arena, Mashhad

=== 5th/6th ===
7 September 2000; 19:00	Iran	35–31	Chinese Taipei	Beheshti Arena, Mashhad

== Final round ==
Semifinals
6 September – Mashhad
Kuwait
South Korea
6 September – Mashhad
Bahrain
Qatar

Gold medal match
8 September – Mashhad
Kuwait	25
Qatar	22
Bronze medal match
8 September – Mashhad
South Korea
Bahrain

=== Semifinals ===
6 September 2000; 16:00	Kuwait	–	South Korea	Beheshti Arena, Mashhad

6 September 2000; 17:30	Bahrain	–	Qatar	Beheshti Arena, Mashhad

=== Bronze medal match ===
8 September 2000; 16:00	South Korea	–	Bahrain	Beheshti Arena, Mashhad

=== Gold medal match ===
8 September 2000; 17:30	Kuwait	25–22	Qatar	Beheshti Arena, Mashhad

== Final standing ==
Rank	Team
1st place, gold medalist(s)	Kuwait
2nd place, silver medalist(s)	Qatar
3rd place, bronze medalist(s)	South Korea
4	Bahrain
5	Iran
6	Chinese Taipei
7	Japan
8	China
9	Oman
10	India
11	Macau

Team qualified for the 2001 Junior World Championship
