= 2008 Asian Men's Junior Handball Championship =

2008 handball championship in Asia

2008 Asian Junior Championship

Tournament details
- Host country: Jordan
- Venue(s): 1 (in 1 host city)
- Dates: 25 July – 5 August 2008
- Teams: 13

Final positions
- Champions: Kuwait (5th title)
- Runner-up: Iran
- Third place: Qatar
- Fourth place: South Korea

Tournament statistics
- Matches played: 37
- Goals scored: 2,371 (64.08 per match)

The 2008 Asian Men's Junior Handball Championship (11th tournament) took place in Amman from 25 July – 5 August. It acts as the Asian qualifying tournament for the 2009 Men's Junior World Handball Championship in Egypt.

== Draw ==
Group A	Group B	Group C	Group D
South Korea; Japan; United Arab Emirates; Iraq	China; Iran; Bahrain	Saudi Arabia; Jordan; India	Kuwait; Qatar; Hong Kong

== Preliminary round ==
=== Group A ===
Team	Pld	W	D	L	GF	GA	GD	Pts
South Korea	3	3	0	0	113	92	+21	6
Japan	3	2	0	1	103	111	−8	4
United Arab Emirates	3	1	0	2	99	95	+4	2
Iraq	3	0	0	3	88	105	−17	0

25 July 2008; 14:00	South Korea	32–29	United Arab Emirates	Prince Faisal Court, Amman
25 July 2008; 14:00		(12–15)		Prince Faisal Court, Amman

25 July 2008; 15:30	Japan	33–32	Iraq	Prince Faisal Court, Amman
25 July 2008; 15:30		(15–15)		Prince Faisal Court, Amman

26 July 2008; 14:00	South Korea	35–29	Iraq	Prince Faisal Court, Amman
26 July 2008; 14:00		(21–12)		Prince Faisal Court, Amman

26 July 2008; 15:30	Japan	36–33	United Arab Emirates	Prince Faisal Court, Amman
26 July 2008; 15:30		(16–15)		Prince Faisal Court, Amman

27 July 2008; 14:00	United Arab Emirates	37–27	Iraq	Prince Faisal Court, Amman
27 July 2008; 14:00		(16–13)		Prince Faisal Court, Amman

27 July 2008; 15:30	South Korea	46–34	Japan	Prince Faisal Court, Amman
27 July 2008; 15:30		(25–16)		Prince Faisal Court, Amman

=== Group B ===
Team	Pld	W	D	L	GF	GA	GD	Pts
Iran	2	2	0	0	73	54	+19	4
Bahrain	2	1	0	1	69	61	+8	2
China	2	0	0	2	56	83	−27	0

25 July 2008; 17:00	China	30–41	Bahrain	Prince Faisal Court, Amman
25 July 2008; 17:00		(12–21)		Prince Faisal Court, Amman

26 July 2008; 17:00	Bahrain	28–31	Iran	Prince Faisal Court, Amman
26 July 2008; 17:00		(14–16)		Prince Faisal Court, Amman

27 July 2008; 17:00	China	26–42	Iran	Prince Faisal Court, Amman
27 July 2008; 17:00		(11–21)		Prince Faisal Court, Amman

=== Group C ===
Team	Pld	W	D	L	GF	GA	GD	Pts
Saudi Arabia	2	2	0	0	72	58	+14	4
Jordan	2	1	0	1	72	60	+12	2
India	2	0	0	2	61	87	−26	0

25 July 2008; 18:30	Saudi Arabia	42–31	India	Prince Faisal Court, Amman
25 July 2008; 18:30		(20–13)		Prince Faisal Court, Amman

26 July 2008; 18:30	India	30–45	Jordan	Prince Faisal Court, Amman
26 July 2008; 18:30		(12–20)		Prince Faisal Court, Amman

27 July 2008; 18:30	Saudi Arabia	30–27	Jordan	Prince Faisal Court, Amman
27 July 2008; 18:30		(14–12)		Prince Faisal Court, Amman

=== Group D ===
Team	Pld	W	D	L	GF	GA	GD	Pts
Kuwait	2	2	0	0	77	38	+39	4
Qatar	2	1	0	1	67	54	+13	2
Hong Kong	2	0	0	2	26	78	−52	0

25 July 2008; 21:00	Kuwait	40–9	Hong Kong	Prince Faisal Court, Amman
25 July 2008; 21:00		(19–3)		Prince Faisal Court, Amman

26 July 2008; 21:00	Hong Kong	17–38	Qatar	Prince Faisal Court, Amman
26 July 2008; 21:00		(6–22)		Prince Faisal Court, Amman

27 July 2008; 21:00	Kuwait	37–29	Qatar	Prince Faisal Court, Amman
27 July 2008; 21:00		(17–11)		Prince Faisal Court, Amman

== Placement 9th–12th ==
Semifinals
2 August–Amman
United Arab Emirates	38
India	19
2 August–Amman
China	33
Hong Kong	23

9th/10th
4 August–Amman
United Arab Emirates	29
China	33
11th/12th
4 August–Amman
India	29
Hong Kong	33

2 August 2008; 16:00	United Arab Emirates	38–19	India	Prince Faisal Court, Amman
2 August 2008; 16:00		(19–10)		Prince Faisal Court, Amman

2 August 2008; 18:00	China	33–23	Hong Kong	Prince Faisal Court, Amman
2 August 2008; 18:00		(18–13)		Prince Faisal Court, Amman

=== 11th/12th ===
4 August 2008; 14:00	India	29–33	Hong Kong	Prince Faisal Court, Amman
4 August 2008; 14:00		(15–16)		Prince Faisal Court, Amman

=== 9th/10th ===
4 August 2008; 16:00	United Arab Emirates	29–33	China	Prince Faisal Court, Amman
4 August 2008; 16:00		(15–15)		Prince Faisal Court, Amman

== Main round ==
=== Group A ===
Team	Pld	W	D	L	GF	GA	GD	Pts
Kuwait	3	3	0	0	106	90	+16	6
Iran	3	2	0	1	110	91	+19	4
Jordan	3	1	0	2	88	100	−12	2
Japan	3	0	0	3	92	115	−23	0

29 July 2008; 15:00	Iran	38–27	Jordan	Prince Faisal Court, Amman
29 July 2008; 15:00		(20–14)		Prince Faisal Court, Amman

29 July 2008; 16:30	Kuwait	41–31	Japan	Prince Faisal Court, Amman
29 July 2008; 16:30		(17–15)		Prince Faisal Court, Amman

30 July 2008; 15:00	Iran	41–31	Japan	Prince Faisal Court, Amman
30 July 2008; 15:00		(20–12)		Prince Faisal Court, Amman

30 July 2008; 16:30	Kuwait	32–28	Jordan	Prince Faisal Court, Amman
30 July 2008; 16:30		(17–14)		Prince Faisal Court, Amman

1 August 2008; 15:00	Iran	31–33	Kuwait	Prince Faisal Court, Amman
1 August 2008; 15:00		(13–20)		Prince Faisal Court, Amman

1 August 2008; 16:30	Jordan	33–30	Japan	Prince Faisal Court, Amman
1 August 2008; 16:30		(15–11)		Prince Faisal Court, Amman

=== Group B ===
Team	Pld	W	D	L	GF	GA	GD	Pts
South Korea	3	2	0	1	97	90	+7	4
Qatar	3	1	1	1	97	95	+2	3
Saudi Arabia	3	1	1	1	82	84	−2	3
Bahrain	3	1	0	2	91	98	−7	2

29 July 2008; 18:00	South Korea	31–30	Bahrain	Prince Faisal Court, Amman
29 July 2008; 18:00		(19–18)		Prince Faisal Court, Amman

29 July 2008; 19:30	Saudi Arabia	26–26	Qatar	Prince Faisal Court, Amman
29 July 2008; 19:30		(11–12)		Prince Faisal Court, Amman

30 July 2008; 18:00	South Korea	40–33	Qatar	Prince Faisal Court, Amman
30 July 2008; 18:00		(21–12)		Prince Faisal Court, Amman

30 July 2008; 19:30	Saudi Arabia	29–32	Bahrain	Prince Faisal Court, Amman
30 July 2008; 19:30		(13–15)		Prince Faisal Court, Amman

1 August 2008; 18:00	South Korea	26–27	Saudi Arabia	Prince Faisal Court, Amman
1 August 2008; 18:00		(11–16)		Prince Faisal Court, Amman

1 August 2008; 19:30	Qatar	38–29	Bahrain	Prince Faisal Court, Amman
1 August 2008; 19:30		(17–14)		Prince Faisal Court, Amman

== Placement 5th–8th ==
=== 7th/8th ===
4 August 2008; 18:00	Japan	31–34	Bahrain	Prince Faisal Court, Amman
4 August 2008; 18:00		(14–15)		Prince Faisal Court, Amman

=== 5th/6th ===
4 August 2008; 20:00	Jordan	31–29	Saudi Arabia	Prince Faisal Court, Amman
4 August 2008; 20:00		(14–13)		Prince Faisal Court, Amman

== Final round ==
Semifinals
3 August – Amman
Kuwait	36
Qatar	29
3 August – Amman
South Korea	28
Iran	36

Gold medal match
5 August – Amman
Kuwait	31
Iran	30
Bronze medal match
5 August – Amman
Qatar	42
South Korea	38

=== Semifinals ===
3 August 2008; 16:00	Kuwait	36–29	Qatar	Prince Faisal Court, Amman
3 August 2008; 16:00		(20–13)		Prince Faisal Court, Amman

3 August 2008; 18:00	South Korea	28–36	Iran	Prince Faisal Court, Amman
3 August 2008; 18:00		(12–18)		Prince Faisal Court, Amman

=== Bronze medal match ===
5 August 2008; 16:00	Qatar	42–38	South Korea	Prince Faisal Court, Amman
5 August 2008; 16:00		(21–17)		Prince Faisal Court, Amman

=== Gold medal match ===
5 August 2008; 18:00	Kuwait	31–30	Iran	Prince Faisal Court, Amman
5 August 2008; 18:00		(17–17)		Prince Faisal Court, Amman

== Final standing ==
Rank	Team
1st place, gold medalist(s)	Kuwait
2nd place, silver medalist(s)	Iran
3rd place, bronze medalist(s)	Qatar
4	South Korea
5	Jordan
6	Saudi Arabia
7	Bahrain
8	Japan
9	China
10	United Arab Emirates
11	Hong Kong
12	India
13	Iraq

Team qualified for the 2009 Junior World Championship
