= 1998 Asian Men's Junior Handball Championship =

1998 handball championship in Asia

1998 Asian Junior Championship
Tournament details
- Host country: Bahrain
- Venue(s): 1 (in 1 host city)
- Dates: 25 August – 8 September 1998
- Teams: 10

Final positions
- Champions: Bahrain (1st title)
- Runner-up: Saudi Arabia
- Third place: Kuwait
- Fourth place: China

The 1998 Asian Men's Junior Handball Championship (6th tournament) took place in Manama from 25 August–8 September. It acts as the Asian qualifying tournament for the 1999 Men's Junior World Handball Championship.

== Draw ==
Group A	Group B
Qatar; Bahrain; China; Oman; United Arab Emirates	Chinese Taipei; Saudi Arabia; South Korea; Kuwait; Japan

== Preliminary round ==
=== Group A ===
Team	Pld	W	D	L	GF	GA	GD	Pts
Bahrain	4	4	0	0	107	98	+9	8
China	4	3	0	1	124	101	+23	6
Oman	4	2	0	2	112	117	−5	4
United Arab Emirates	4	1	0	3	104	115	−11	2
Qatar	4	0	0	4	102	118	−16	0

25 August 1998	Oman	26–29	Bahrain	Manama

25 August 1998	United Arab Emirates	37–30	Qatar	Manama

27 August 1998	United Arab Emirates	19–33	China	Manama

27 August 1998	Qatar	24–25	Bahrain	Manama

29 August 1998	Qatar	26–27	Oman	Manama

29 August 1998	Bahrain	28–26	China	Manama

31 August 1998	China	29–22	Qatar	Manama

31 August 1998	Oman	27–26	United Arab Emirates	Manama

2 September 1998	Bahrain	25–22	United Arab Emirates	Manama

2 September 1998	China	36–32	Oman	Manama

=== Group B ===
Team	Pld	W	D	L	GF	GA	GD	Pts
Saudi Arabia	4	4	0	0	102	82	+20	8
Kuwait	4	2	1	1	98	90	+8	5
South Korea	4	2	0	2	108	111	−3	4
Chinese Taipei	4	1	1	2	115	123	−8	3
Japan	4	0	0	4	96	113	−17	0

26 August 1998	Chinese Taipei	30–30	Kuwait	Manama

26 August 1998	Saudi Arabia	29–22	South Korea	Manama

28 August 1998	Japan	27–29	South Korea	Manama

28 August 1998	Chinese Taipei	22–28	Saudi Arabia	Manama

30 August 1998	Kuwait	17–20	Saudi Arabia	Manama

30 August 1998	Japan	28–35	Chinese Taipei	Manama

1 September 1998	South Korea	37–28	Chinese Taipei	Manama

1 September 1998	Kuwait	24–20	Japan	Manama

3 September 1998	Saudi Arabia	25–21	Japan	Manama

3 September 1998	South Korea	20–27	Kuwait	Manama

== Final round ==
Semifinals
7 September – Manama
Bahrain	23
Kuwait	20
7 September – Manama
Saudi Arabia	23
China	18

Gold medal match
8 September – Manama
Bahrain	24
Saudi Arabia	17
Bronze medal match
8 September – Manama
Kuwait	25
China	20

=== Semifinals ===
7 September 1998	Bahrain	23–20	Kuwait	Manama

7 September 1998	Saudi Arabia	23–18	China	Manama

=== Bronze medal match ===
8 September 1998	Kuwait	25–20	China	Manama

=== Gold medal match ===
8 September 1998	Bahrain	24–17	Saudi Arabia	Manama

== Final standing ==
Rank	Team
1st place, gold medalist(s)	Bahrain
2nd place, silver medalist(s)	Saudi Arabia
3rd place, bronze medalist(s)	Kuwait
4	China
5	South Korea
6	Oman
7	Chinese Taipei
8	United Arab Emirates
9	Qatar
10	Japan

Team qualified for the 1999 Junior World Championship
