= Sajjad Nadri =

Iranian handball player (born 1990)

Personal information
- Nationality: Iranian
- Born: 28 May 1990 (age 36)
- Height: 1.94 m (6 ft 4 in)

Sport
- Sport: Handball
- Position: Right back
- Current club: Samen Sabzevar
National team
Years	Team	Apps	(Gls)
–	Iran	40	(182)

Sajjad Nadri (Persian: سجاد ندری, born 28 May 1990) is an Iranian handball player for Samen Sabzevar and the Iranian national team.
