= 2014 Asian Men's Junior Handball Championship =

2014 handball championship in Asia

- Logo of 14th Asian Men's Junior Handball Championship

Tournament details
- Host country: Iran
- Venue: 1 (in 1 host city)
- Dates: 2–14 August 2014
- Teams: 11 (from 1 confederation)

Final positions
- Champions: Qatar (4th title)
- Runners-up: South Korea
- Third place: Japan
- Fourth place: Iran

Tournament statistics
- Matches played: 35
- Goals scored: 1,820 (52 per match)

The 2014 Asian Men's Junior Handball Championship is the 14th edition of the Asian Men's Junior Handball Championship held from 2–14 August 2014 at Tabriz, I. R. Iran under the aegis of Asian Handball Federation. It also acts as the qualification tournament for the 2015 Men's Junior World Handball Championship. Qatar wins the title by beating South Korea in the final match.

== Draw ==
Group A	Group B
Qatar	South Korea
Japan	Kuwait
Syria	Iran
Uzbekistan	Bahrain
Oman	Iraq
Saudi Arabia	

== Group A ==
Team	Pld	W	D	L	GF	GA	GD	Pts
Qatar	5	5	0	0	152	81	+71	10
Japan	5	4	0	1	155	107	+48	8
Saudi Arabia	5	3	0	2	143	109	+34	6
Syria	5	1	1	3	119	153	−34	3
Uzbekistan	5	1	0	4	114	159	−45	2
Oman	5	0	1	4	81	155	−74	1

3 August 2014	Uzbekistan	22-39	Saudi Arabia	Tabriz, Iran
3 August 2014		(10-21)		Tabriz, Iran

3 August 2014	Syria	28-28	Oman	Tabriz, Iran
3 August 2014		(16-14)		Tabriz, Iran

3 August 2014	Japan	18-26	Qatar	Tabriz, Iran
3 August 2014		(8-12)		Tabriz, Iran

5 August 2014	Syria	18-30	Qatar	Tabriz, Iran
5 August 2014		(12-17)		Tabriz, Iran

5 August 2014	Uzbekistan	29-15	Oman	Tabriz, Iran
5 August 2014		(17-5)		Tabriz, Iran

5 August 2014	Saudi Arabia	27-33	Japan	Tabriz, Iran
5 August 2014		(10-14)		Tabriz, Iran

7 August 2014	Qatar	42-14	Uzbekistan	Tabriz, Iran
7 August 2014		(19-7)		Tabriz, Iran

7 August 2014	Oman	14-28	Saudi Arabia	Tabriz, Iran
7 August 2014		(5-15)		Tabriz, Iran

7 August 2014	Japan	35-23	Syria	Tabriz, Iran
7 August 2014		(15-10)		Tabriz, Iran

9 August 2014	Japan	31-19	Uzbekistan	Tabriz, Iran
9 August 2014		(17-12)		Tabriz, Iran

9 August 2014	Saudi Arabia	30-18	Syria	Tabriz, Iran
9 August 2014		(13-8)		Tabriz, Iran

9 August 2014	Qatar	32-12	Oman	Tabriz, Iran
9 August 2014		(15-6)		Tabriz, Iran

11 August 2014	Oman	12-38	Japan	Tabriz, Iran
11 August 2014		(6-19)		Tabriz, Iran

11 August 2014	Uzbekistan	30-32	Syria	Tabriz, Iran
11 August 2014		(12-17)		Tabriz, Iran

11 August 2014	Qatar	22-19	Saudi Arabia	Tabriz, Iran
11 August 2014		(11-9)		Tabriz, Iran

== Group B ==
Team	Pld	W	D	L	GF	GA	GD	Pts
South Korea	4	4	0	0	128	95	+33	8
Iran	4	3	0	1	122	108	+14	6
Kuwait	4	1	1	2	98	99	−1	3
Iraq	4	1	0	3	92	109	−17	2
Bahrain	4	0	1	3	87	116	−29	1

2 August 2014	Iraq	20-24	Kuwait	Tabriz, Iran
2 August 2014		(9-9)		Tabriz, Iran

2 August 2014	Bahrain	19-33	South Korea	Tabriz, Iran
2 August 2014		(9-16)		Tabriz, Iran

4 August 2014	Kuwait	25-25	Bahrain	Tabriz, Iran
4 August 2014		(12-13)		Tabriz, Iran

4 August 2014	Iraq	26-35	Iran	Tabriz, Iran
4 August 2014		(9-18)		Tabriz, Iran

6 August 2014	South Korea	30-20	Iraq	Tabriz, Iran
6 August 2014		(14-11)		Tabriz, Iran

6 August 2014	Iran	25-23	Kuwait	Tabriz, Iran
6 August 2014		(15-15)		Tabriz, Iran

8 August 2014	Bahrain	20-26	Iraq	Tabriz, Iran
8 August 2014		(8-16)		Tabriz, Iran

8 August 2014	South Korea	36-30	Iran	Tabriz, Iran
8 August 2014		(16-11)		Tabriz, Iran

10 August 2014	South Korea	29-26	Kuwait	Tabriz, Iran
10 August 2014		(15-12)		Tabriz, Iran

10 August 2014	Iran	32-23	Bahrain	Tabriz, Iran
10 August 2014		(15-8)		Tabriz, Iran

== Placement matches ==
12 August 2014	Bahrain	34-23	Oman	Tabriz, Iran
12 August 2014		(19-12)		Tabriz, Iran

12 August 2014	Saudi Arabia	34-20	Iraq	Tabriz, Iran
12 August 2014		(15-9)		Tabriz, Iran

12 August 2014	Kuwait	25-23	Syria	Tabriz, Iran
12 August 2014		(11-12)		Tabriz, Iran

=== 9th–10th-place match ===
13 August 2014	Uzbekistan	25-27	Bahrain	Tabriz, Iran
13 August 2014		(14-15)		Tabriz, Iran

=== 7th–8th-place match ===
13 August 2014	Iraq	26-27	Syria	Tabriz, Iran
13 August 2014		(12-18)		Tabriz, Iran

=== 5th–6th-place match ===
13 August 2014	Saudi Arabia	23-17	Kuwait	Tabriz, Iran
13 August 2014		(9-9)		Tabriz, Iran

== Knockout stage ==
=== Semifinal matches ===
12 August 2014	Qatar	26-20	Iran	Tabriz, Iran
12 August 2014		(13-7)		Tabriz, Iran

12 August 2014	South Korea	32-25	Japan	Tabriz, Iran
12 August 2014		(14-11)		Tabriz, Iran

=== Bronze-medal match ===
14 August 2014	Japan	33-32	Iran	Tabriz, Iran
14 August 2014		(16-16)		Tabriz, Iran

=== Final match ===
14 August 2014	South Korea	28-29	Qatar	Tabriz, Iran
14 August 2014		(12-13)		Tabriz, Iran

== Final standings ==
Rank	Team
1st place, gold medalist(s)	Qatar
2nd place, silver medalist(s)	South Korea
3rd place, bronze medalist(s)	Japan
4	Iran
5	Saudi Arabia
6	Kuwait
7	Syria
8	Iraq
9	Bahrain
10	Uzbekistan
11	Oman

Team qualified for the 2015 Junior World Championship
