= 2006 Asian Men's Junior Handball Championship =

2006 handball championship in Asia

2006 Asian Junior Championship
Tournament details
- Host country: Japan
- Venue(s): 1 (in 1 host city)
- Dates: 22–31 August 2006
- Teams: 11

Final positions
- Champions: Kuwait (4th title)
- Runner-up: South Korea
- Third place: Saudi Arabia
- Fourth place: China

Tournament statistics
- Matches played: 32
- Goals scored: 1,990 (62.19 per match)
- Top scorer(s): (Iran) Allahkaram Esteki (52)

The 2006 Asian Men's Junior Handball Championship (10th tournament) took place in Hiroshima from 22 August–31 August. It acts as the Asian qualifying tournament for the 2007 Men's Junior World Handball Championship in Macedonia.

== Draw ==
Group A	Group B
South Korea; Japan; China; India; Macau	Kuwait; Iran; Qatar; Chinese Taipei; Hong Kong; Saudi Arabia

== Preliminary round ==
=== Group A ===
Team	Pld	W	D	L	GF	GA	GD	Pts
South Korea	4	4	0	0	155	103	+52	8
China	4	3	0	1	137	105	+32	6
Japan	4	2	0	2	138	94	+44	4
India	4	1	0	3	102	138	−36	2
Macau	4	0	0	4	67	159	−92	0

22 August 2006; 15:00	South Korea	35–34	China	Higashiku Sports Center, Hiroshima
22 August 2006; 15:00		(21–15)		Higashiku Sports Center, Hiroshima

22 August 2006; 18:00	Japan	36–12	Macau	Higashiku Sports Center, Hiroshima
22 August 2006; 18:00		(17–4)		Higashiku Sports Center, Hiroshima

23 August 2006; 12:00	India	20–39	South Korea	Higashiku Sports Center, Hiroshima
23 August 2006; 12:00		(10–18)		Higashiku Sports Center, Hiroshima

23 August 2006; 15:00	China	33–30	Japan	Higashiku Sports Center, Hiroshima
23 August 2006; 15:00		(20–15)		Higashiku Sports Center, Hiroshima

24 August 2006; 12:00	South Korea	48–20	Macau	Higashiku Sports Center, Hiroshima
24 August 2006; 12:00		(27–8)		Higashiku Sports Center, Hiroshima

24 August 2006; 16:30	China	32–29	India	Higashiku Sports Center, Hiroshima
24 August 2006; 16:30		(19–13)		Higashiku Sports Center, Hiroshima

26 August 2006; 12:00	Japan	43–16	India	Higashiku Sports Center, Hiroshima
26 August 2006; 12:00		(21–10)		Higashiku Sports Center, Hiroshima

26 August 2006; 16:30	Macau	11–38	China	Higashiku Sports Center, Hiroshima
26 August 2006; 16:30		(4–16)		Higashiku Sports Center, Hiroshima

27 August 2006; 12:00	India	37–24	Macau	Higashiku Sports Center, Hiroshima
27 August 2006; 12:00		(18–9)		Higashiku Sports Center, Hiroshima

27 August 2006; 16:30	South Korea	33–29	Japan	Higashiku Sports Center, Hiroshima
27 August 2006; 16:30		(16–14)		Higashiku Sports Center, Hiroshima

=== Group B ===
Team	Pld	W	D	L	GF	GA	GD	Pts
Kuwait	5	5	0	0	175	131	+44	10
Saudi Arabia	5	3	1	1	177	147	+30	7
Iran	5	3	0	2	183	141	+42	6
Qatar	5	2	1	2	155	138	+17	5
Chinese Taipei	5	1	0	4	158	179	−21	2
Hong Kong	5	0	0	5	98	210	−112	0

22 August 2006; 12:00	Chinese Taipei	39–21	Hong Kong	Higashiku Sports Center, Hiroshima
22 August 2006; 12:00		(18–9)		Higashiku Sports Center, Hiroshima

22 August 2006; 13:30	Iran	35–30	Qatar	Higashiku Sports Center, Hiroshima
22 August 2006; 13:30		(16–16)		Higashiku Sports Center, Hiroshima

22 August 2006; 16:30	Kuwait	34–25	Saudi Arabia	Higashiku Sports Center, Hiroshima
22 August 2006; 16:30		(16–10)		Higashiku Sports Center, Hiroshima

23 August 2006; 13:30	Kuwait	42–27	Chinese Taipei	Higashiku Sports Center, Hiroshima
23 August 2006; 13:30		(26–13)		Higashiku Sports Center, Hiroshima

23 August 2006; 16:30	Iran	31–32	Saudi Arabia	Higashiku Sports Center, Hiroshima
23 August 2006; 16:30		(15–16)		Higashiku Sports Center, Hiroshima

23 August 2006; 18:00	Qatar	35–19	Hong Kong	Higashiku Sports Center, Hiroshima
23 August 2006; 18:00		(18–10)		Higashiku Sports Center, Hiroshima

24 August 2006; 13:30	Iran	48–16	Hong Kong	Higashiku Sports Center, Hiroshima
24 August 2006; 13:30		(21–7)		Higashiku Sports Center, Hiroshima

24 August 2006; 15:00	Qatar	25–30	Kuwait	Higashiku Sports Center, Hiroshima
24 August 2006; 15:00		(12–12)		Higashiku Sports Center, Hiroshima

24 August 2006; 18:00	Saudi Arabia	41–35	Chinese Taipei	Higashiku Sports Center, Hiroshima
24 August 2006; 18:00		(20–13)		Higashiku Sports Center, Hiroshima

26 August 2006; 13:30	Hong Kong	17–49	Saudi Arabia	Higashiku Sports Center, Hiroshima
26 August 2006; 13:30		(11–24)		Higashiku Sports Center, Hiroshima

26 August 2006; 15:00	Qatar	35–24	Chinese Taipei	Higashiku Sports Center, Hiroshima
26 August 2006; 15:00		(17–9)		Higashiku Sports Center, Hiroshima

26 August 2006; 18:00	Kuwait	30–29	Iran	Higashiku Sports Center, Hiroshima
26 August 2006; 18:00		(16–14)		Higashiku Sports Center, Hiroshima

27 August 2006; 13:30	Chinese Taipei	33–40	Iran	Higashiku Sports Center, Hiroshima
27 August 2006; 13:30		(17–21)		Higashiku Sports Center, Hiroshima

27 August 2006; 15:00	Hong Kong	25–39	Kuwait	Higashiku Sports Center, Hiroshima
27 August 2006; 15:00		(13–17)		Higashiku Sports Center, Hiroshima

27 August 2006; 18:00	Saudi Arabia	30–30	Qatar	Higashiku Sports Center, Hiroshima
27 August 2006; 18:00		(14–15)		Higashiku Sports Center, Hiroshima

== Placement 5th–10th ==
=== 9th/10th ===
30 August 2006; 15:00	Macau	14–47	Chinese Taipei	Higashiku Sports Center, Hiroshima
30 August 2006; 15:00		(8–27)		Higashiku Sports Center, Hiroshima

=== 7th/8th ===
30 August 2006; 16:30	India	19–41	Qatar	Higashiku Sports Center, Hiroshima
30 August 2006; 16:30		(9–19)		Higashiku Sports Center, Hiroshima

=== 5th/6th ===
30 August 2006; 18:00	Japan	32–27	Iran	Higashiku Sports Center, Hiroshima
30 August 2006; 18:00		(17–17)		Higashiku Sports Center, Hiroshima

== Final round ==
Semifinals
29 August – Hiroshima
South Korea	35
Saudi Arabia	26
29 August – Hiroshima
Kuwait	41
China	35

Gold medal match
31 August – Hiroshima
South Korea	28
Kuwait	34
Bronze medal match
31 August – Hiroshima
Saudi Arabia	40
China	26

=== Semifinals ===
29 August 2006; 15:00	South Korea	35–26	Saudi Arabia	Higashiku Sports Center, Hiroshima
29 August 2006; 15:00		(16–10)		Higashiku Sports Center, Hiroshima

29 August 2006; 16:30	Kuwait	41–35	China	Higashiku Sports Center, Hiroshima
29 August 2006; 16:30		(18–17)		Higashiku Sports Center, Hiroshima

=== Bronze medal match ===
31 August 2006; 14:00	Saudi Arabia	40–26	China	Higashiku Sports Center, Hiroshima
31 August 2006; 14:00		(17–12)		Higashiku Sports Center, Hiroshima

=== Gold medal match ===
31 August 2006; 16:00	South Korea	28–34	Kuwait	Higashiku Sports Center, Hiroshima
31 August 2006; 16:00		(12–18)		Higashiku Sports Center, Hiroshima

== Final standing ==
Rank	Team
1st place, gold medalist(s)	Kuwait
2nd place, silver medalist(s)	South Korea
3rd place, bronze medalist(s)	Saudi Arabia
4	China
5	Japan
6	Iran
7	Qatar
8	India
9	Chinese Taipei
10	Macau
11	Hong Kong

Team qualified for the 2007 Junior World Championship
