= 2002 Asian Men's Junior Handball Championship =

2002 handball championship in Asia

2002 Asian Junior Championship
Tournament details
- Host country: Thailand
- Venue: 1 (in 1 host city)
- Dates: 21–30 August 2002
- Teams: 8

Final positions
- Champions: Kuwait (2nd title)
- Runners-up: Qatar
- Third place: South Korea
- Fourth place: United Arab Emirates

Tournament statistics
- Matches played: 18
- Goals scored: 1,132 (62.89 per match)

The 2002 Asian Men's Junior Handball Championship (8th tournament) took place in Bangkok from 21 August–31 August. It acts as the Asian qualifying tournament for the 2003 Men's Junior World Handball Championship in Brazil.

== Draw ==
Group A	Group B
Kuwait; Thailand; Japan; United Arab Emirates	Qatar; South Korea; Chinese Taipei; China

== Preliminary round ==
=== Group A ===
Team	Pld	W	D	L	GF	GA	GD	Pts
Kuwait	3	3	0	0	80	60	+20	6
United Arab Emirates	3	2	0	1	98	91	+7	4
Japan	3	1	0	2	86	80	+6	2
Thailand	3	0	0	3	78	111	−33	0

21 August 2002; 16:00	Thailand	24–35	Japan	Nimibutr Stadium, Bangkok; Referees: Al-Mulla, Al-Zarraa (QAT)
21 August 2002; 16:00		(9–17)		Nimibutr Stadium, Bangkok; Referees: Al-Mulla, Al-Zarraa (QAT)

22 August 2002; 16:00	Kuwait	21–17	Japan	Nimibutr Stadium, Bangkok; Referees: Al-Sheikh, Al-Nofli (OMA)
22 August 2002; 16:00		(11–7)		Nimibutr Stadium, Bangkok; Referees: Al-Sheikh, Al-Nofli (OMA)

23 August 2002; 16:00	Thailand	30–44	United Arab Emirates	Nimibutr Stadium, Bangkok; Referees: Nakada, Uemura (JPN)
23 August 2002; 16:00		(15–23)		Nimibutr Stadium, Bangkok; Referees: Nakada, Uemura (JPN)

24 August 2002; 16:00	Kuwait	27–19	United Arab Emirates	Nimibutr Stadium, Bangkok; Referees: Kouzehgari, Hayatpour (IRI)
24 August 2002; 16:00		(13–6)		Nimibutr Stadium, Bangkok; Referees: Kouzehgari, Hayatpour (IRI)

25 August 2002; 16:00	Kuwait	32–24	Thailand	Nimibutr Stadium, Bangkok; Referees: Al-Suwaidi, Al-Marzouqi (UAE)
25 August 2002; 16:00		(16–6)		Nimibutr Stadium, Bangkok; Referees: Al-Suwaidi, Al-Marzouqi (UAE)

26 August 2002; 16:00	Japan	34–35	United Arab Emirates	Nimibutr Stadium, Bangkok; Referees: Al-Mulla, Al-Zarraa (QAT)
26 August 2002; 16:00		(16–16)		Nimibutr Stadium, Bangkok; Referees: Al-Mulla, Al-Zarraa (QAT)

=== Group B ===
Team	Pld	W	D	L	GF	GA	GD	Pts
Qatar	3	3	0	0	109	78	+31	6
South Korea	3	2	0	1	104	103	+1	4
Chinese Taipei	3	1	0	2	111	115	−4	2
China	3	0	0	3	90	118	−28	0

21 August 2002; 18:00	South Korea	42–34	Chinese Taipei	Nimibutr Stadium, Bangkok; Referees: Al-Shuwairbat, Al-Shutti (KUW)
21 August 2002; 18:00		(17–17)		Nimibutr Stadium, Bangkok; Referees: Al-Shuwairbat, Al-Shutti (KUW)

22 August 2002; 18:00	Qatar	36–25	Chinese Taipei	Nimibutr Stadium, Bangkok; Referees: Al-Suwaidi, Al-Marzouqi (UAE)
22 August 2002; 18:00		(21–10)		Nimibutr Stadium, Bangkok; Referees: Al-Suwaidi, Al-Marzouqi (UAE)

23 August 2002; 18:00	South Korea	37–29	China	Nimibutr Stadium, Bangkok; Referees: Kouzehgari, Hayatpour (IRI)
23 August 2002; 18:00		(21–10)		Nimibutr Stadium, Bangkok; Referees: Kouzehgari, Hayatpour (IRI)

24 August 2002; 18:00	Qatar	33–24	China	Nimibutr Stadium, Bangkok; Referees: Al-Sheikh, Al-Nofli (OMA)
24 August 2002; 18:00		(20–15)		Nimibutr Stadium, Bangkok; Referees: Al-Sheikh, Al-Nofli (OMA)

25 August 2002; 18:00	Qatar	40–25	South Korea	Nimibutr Stadium, Bangkok; Referees: Al-Shuwairbat, Al-Shutti (KUW)
25 August 2002; 18:00		(19–10)		Nimibutr Stadium, Bangkok; Referees: Al-Shuwairbat, Al-Shutti (KUW)

26 August 2002; 18:00	Chinese Taipei	48–37	China	Nimibutr Stadium, Bangkok; Referees: Nakada, Uemura (JPN)
26 August 2002; 18:00		(21–17)		Nimibutr Stadium, Bangkok; Referees: Nakada, Uemura (JPN)

== Placement 5th–8th ==
=== 7th/8th ===
29 August 2002; 16:00	Thailand	26–36	China	Nimibutr Stadium, Bangkok; Referees: Al-Suwaidi, Al-Marzouqi (UAE)
29 August 2002; 16:00		(12–18)		Nimibutr Stadium, Bangkok; Referees: Al-Suwaidi, Al-Marzouqi (UAE)

=== 5th/6th ===
29 August 2002; 18:00	Japan	33–29	Chinese Taipei	Nimibutr Stadium, Bangkok; Referees: Al-Shuwairbat, Al-Shutti (KUW)
29 August 2002; 18:00		(15–12)		Nimibutr Stadium, Bangkok; Referees: Al-Shuwairbat, Al-Shutti (KUW)

== Final round ==
Semifinals
28 August – Bangkok
Kuwait	31
South Korea	27
28 August – Bangkok
Qatar	33
United Arab Emirates	29

Gold medal match
30 August – Bangkok
Kuwait	23
Qatar	21
Bronze medal match
30 August – Bangkok
South Korea	48
United Arab Emirates	40

=== Semifinals ===
28 August 2002; 16:00	Kuwait	31–27	South Korea	Nimibutr Stadium, Bangkok; Referees: Al-Mulla, Al-Zarraa (QAT)
28 August 2002; 16:00		(16–11)		Nimibutr Stadium, Bangkok; Referees: Al-Mulla, Al-Zarraa (QAT)

28 August 2002; 18:00	Qatar	33–29	United Arab Emirates	Nimibutr Stadium, Bangkok; Referees: Kouzehgari, Hayatpour (IRI)
28 August 2002; 18:00		(15–12)		Nimibutr Stadium, Bangkok; Referees: Kouzehgari, Hayatpour (IRI)

=== Bronze medal match ===
30 August 2002; 16:00	South Korea	48–40	United Arab Emirates	Nimibutr Stadium, Bangkok; Referees: Nakada, Uemura (JPN)
30 August 2002; 16:00		(25–17)		Nimibutr Stadium, Bangkok; Referees: Nakada, Uemura (JPN)

=== Gold medal match ===
30 August 2002; 18:00	Kuwait	23–21	Qatar	Nimibutr Stadium, Bangkok; Referees: Al-Sheikh, Al-Nofli (OMA)
30 August 2002; 18:00		(12–10)		Nimibutr Stadium, Bangkok; Referees: Al-Sheikh, Al-Nofli (OMA)

== Final standing ==
Rank	Team
1st place, gold medalist(s)	Kuwait
2nd place, silver medalist(s)	Qatar
3rd place, bronze medalist(s)	South Korea
4	United Arab Emirates
5	Japan
6	Chinese Taipei
7	China
8	Thailand

Team qualified for the 2003 Junior World Championship
