= Afshin Sadeghi =

Iranian handball player (born 1993)

Personal information
- Full name: Afshin Sadeghi Asgari
- Nationality: Iranian
- Born: 25 March 1993 (age 33) Kerman, Iran
- Height: 1.95 m (6 ft 5 in)

Sport
- Sport: Handball
- Position: Left back
- Current club: Mes Kerman
National team
Years	Team	Apps	(Gls)
–	Iran	21	(55)

Afshin Sadeghi (Persian: افشین صادقی, born 25 March 1993) is an Iranian handball player for Mes Kerman and the Iranian national team.
