= 2010 Asian Men's Junior Handball Championship =

2010 handball championship in Asia

2010 Asian Junior Championship

Tournament details
- Host country: Iran
- Venue: 1 (in 1 host city)
- Dates: 23 July – 1 August 2010
- Teams: 7

Final positions
- Champions: Qatar (2nd title)
- Runners-up: South Korea
- Third place: Iran
- Fourth place: United Arab Emirates

Tournament statistics
- Matches played: 14
- Goals scored: 871 (62.21 per match)

The 2010 Asian Men's Junior Handball Championship (12th tournament) took place in Tehran from July 23 – August 1. It acts as the Asian qualifying tournament for the 2011 Men's Junior World Handball Championship.

== Draw ==
Group A	Group B
~~Kuwait~~ * Iran; Bahrain; United Arab Emirates	Qatar; South Korea; Japan; Syria

* Following the IOC decision to suspend the NOC of Kuwait which came in force on 1 January 2010, the International Handball Federation decided to suspend handball in Kuwait in all categories.

== Preliminary round ==
=== Group A ===
Team	Pld	W	D	L	GF	GA	GD	Pts
Iran	2	2	0	0	70	55	+15	4
United Arab Emirates	2	1	0	1	60	72	−12	2
Bahrain	2	0	0	2	60	63	−3	0

23 July 2010; 16:00	Iran	40–27	United Arab Emirates	Handball Hall, Tehran; Referees: Ossipov, Porol (KAZ)
23 July 2010; 16:00		(22–13)		Handball Hall, Tehran; Referees: Ossipov, Porol (KAZ)

25 July 2010; 16:30	Bahrain	32–33	United Arab Emirates	Handball Hall, Tehran; Referees: Dib, Haidar (LIB)
25 July 2010; 16:30		(14–16)		Handball Hall, Tehran; Referees: Dib, Haidar (LIB)

27 July 2010; 16:30	Iran	30–28	Bahrain	Handball Hall, Tehran; Referees: Dib, Haidar (LIB)
27 July 2010; 16:30		(15–16)		Handball Hall, Tehran; Referees: Dib, Haidar (LIB)

=== Group B ===
Team	Pld	W	D	L	GF	GA	GD	Pts
South Korea	3	2	1	0	93	72	+21	5
Qatar	3	1	2	0	87	85	+2	4
Japan	3	1	0	2	102	85	+17	2
Syria	3	0	1	2	71	111	−40	1

24 July 2010; 16:00	Qatar	34–32	Japan	Handball Hall, Tehran; Referees: Karbaschi, Kolahdouzan (IRI)
24 July 2010; 16:00		(13–15)		Handball Hall, Tehran; Referees: Karbaschi, Kolahdouzan (IRI)

24 July 2010; 17:30	South Korea	39–21	Syria	Handball Hall, Tehran; Referees: Al-Watani, Qamber (BHR)
24 July 2010; 17:30		(16–13)		Handball Hall, Tehran; Referees: Al-Watani, Qamber (BHR)

26 July 2010; 16:00	Qatar	28–28	Syria	Handball Hall, Tehran; Referees: Ossipov, Porol (KAZ)
26 July 2010; 16:00		(15–13)		Handball Hall, Tehran; Referees: Ossipov, Porol (KAZ)

26 July 2010; 17:30	South Korea	29–26	Japan	Handball Hall, Tehran; Referees: Karbaschi, Kolahdouzan (IRI)
26 July 2010; 17:30		(15–13)		Handball Hall, Tehran; Referees: Karbaschi, Kolahdouzan (IRI)

28 July 2010; 16:00	Qatar	25–25	South Korea	Handball Hall, Tehran; Referees: Ossipov, Porol (KAZ)
28 July 2010; 16:00		(10–10)		Handball Hall, Tehran; Referees: Ossipov, Porol (KAZ)

28 July 2010; 17:30	Japan	44–22	Syria	Handball Hall, Tehran; Referees: Mahdi, Abu-Hamza (IRQ)
28 July 2010; 17:30		(21–15)		Handball Hall, Tehran; Referees: Mahdi, Abu-Hamza (IRQ)

== Placement 5th/6th ==
31 July 2010; 17:00	Bahrain	28–31	Japan	Handball Hall, Tehran; Referees: Ghazal, Shoaib (SYR)
31 July 2010; 17:00		(15–14)		Handball Hall, Tehran; Referees: Ghazal, Shoaib (SYR)

== Final round ==
Semifinals
30 July – Tehran
Iran	27
Qatar	37
30 July – Tehran
South Korea	44
United Arab Emirates	31

Gold medal match
1 August – Tehran
Qatar	32
South Korea	27
Bronze medal match
1 August – Tehran
Iran	37
United Arab Emirates	34

=== Semifinals ===
30 July 2010; 16:00	Iran	27–37	Qatar	Handball Hall, Tehran; Referees: Ossipov, Porol (KAZ)
30 July 2010; 16:00		(8–15)		Handball Hall, Tehran; Referees: Ossipov, Porol (KAZ)

30 July 2010; 18:00	South Korea	44–31	United Arab Emirates	Handball Hall, Tehran; Referees: Al-Watani, Qamber (BHR)
30 July 2010; 18:00		(15–8)		Handball Hall, Tehran; Referees: Al-Watani, Qamber (BHR)

=== Bronze medal match ===
1 August 2010; 16:00	Iran	37–34	United Arab Emirates	Handball Hall, Tehran; Referees: Dib, Haidar (LIB)
1 August 2010; 16:00		(21–13)		Handball Hall, Tehran; Referees: Dib, Haidar (LIB)

=== Gold medal match ===
1 August 2010; 18:00	Qatar	32–27	South Korea	Handball Hall, Tehran; Referees: Karbaschi, Kolahdouzan (IRI)
1 August 2010; 18:00		(16–12)		Handball Hall, Tehran; Referees: Karbaschi, Kolahdouzan (IRI)

== Final standing ==
Rank	Team
1st place, gold medalist(s)	Qatar
2nd place, silver medalist(s)	South Korea
3rd place, bronze medalist(s)	Iran
4	United Arab Emirates
5	Japan
6	Bahrain
7	Syria

Team qualified for the 2011 Junior World Championship
