= 1996 Asian Men's Junior Handball Championship =

1996 handball championship in Asia

1996 Asian Junior Championship
Tournament details
- Host country: United Arab Emirates
- Venue(s): 1 (in 1 host city)
- Dates: 21–30 August 1996
- Teams: 10

Final positions
- Champions: United Arab Emirates (1st title)
- Runner-up: Saudi Arabia
- Third place: Qatar
- Fourth place: South Korea

Tournament statistics
- Matches played: 24

The 1996 Asian Men's Junior Handball Championship (5th tournament) took place in Dubai from 21 August–30 August. It acts as the Asian qualifying tournament for the 1997 Men's Junior World Handball Championship.

== Preliminary round ==
The top two finishers from each preliminary round group progressed to the next round.

Group A	Group B	Group C
Qatar; South Korea; Iran; Kuwait	Bahrain; Japan; China	United Arab Emirates; Saudi Arabia; Oman

== Elimination round ==
United Arab Emirates, Saudi Arabia and Qatar won their Elimination matches and advanced to the final round.

== Final round ==
=== Placement 7th–9th ===
Team	Pld	W	D	L	GF	GA	GD	Pts
Oman	2	2	0	0	-	-	—	4
Iran	2	1	0	1	62	50	+12	2
China	2	0	0	2	-	-	—	0

28 August 1996	Iran	37–24	China	Dubai

29 August 1996	Oman	26–25	Iran	Dubai

30 August 1996	China	–	Oman	Dubai

=== Placement 4th–6th ===
Team	Pld	W	D	L	GF	GA	GD	Pts
South Korea	2	2	0	0	60	50	+10	4
Bahrain	2	1	0	1	-	-	—	2
Japan	2	0	0	2	-	-	—	0

28 August 1996	South Korea	30–25	Japan	Dubai

29 August 1996	Bahrain	25–30	South Korea	Dubai

30 August 1996	Japan	–	Bahrain	Dubai

=== Championship ===
Team	Pld	W	D	L	GF	GA	GD	Pts
United Arab Emirates	2	2	0	0	-	-	—	4
Saudi Arabia	2	1	0	1	38	38	0	2
Qatar	2	0	0	2	-	-	—	0

28 August 1996	Saudi Arabia	16–18	United Arab Emirates	Dubai

29 August 1996	Qatar	20–22	Saudi Arabia	Dubai

30 August 1996	United Arab Emirates	–	Qatar	Dubai

== Final standing ==
Rank	Team
1st place, gold medalist(s)	United Arab Emirates
2nd place, silver medalist(s)	Saudi Arabia
3rd place, bronze medalist(s)	Qatar
4	South Korea
5	Bahrain
6	Japan
7	Oman
8	Iran
9	China
10	Kuwait

Team qualified for the 1997 Junior World Championship
