= Hong Kong men's national handball team =

Hong Kong

Information
- Association: Hong Kong Handball Association
- Assistant coach: Kim Ekdahl Du Rietz; Jia Dong Jin

Colours
1st	2nd

Results

Asian Championship
- Appearances: 6 (First in 1983)
- Best result: 8th (1983)
- Last updated on Unknown.

The Hong Kong national handball team is the national team of Hong Kong. It is governed by the Handball Association of Hong Kong and takes part in international handball competitions.

== Tournament history ==
=== Asian Championship ===
- 1983 – 8th place
- 1989 – 9th place
- 2020 – 10th place
- 2022 – 11th place
- 2024 – 13th place
- 2026 – 10th place

=== Asian Games ===
- Handball at the 1986 Asian Games
- Handball at the 2010 Asian Games
- Handball at the 2014 Asian Games
- Handball at the 2018 Asian Games
- Handball at the 2022 Asian Games
- Handball at the 2026 Asian Games
