= Oman men's national handball team =

Oman

Information
- Association: Oman Handball Association
- Coach: Nabil Al-Balushi
- Assistant coach: Ahmed Ambu Saidi

Colours
1st	2nd	3rd

Results

Asian Championship
- Appearances: 7 (First in 2004)
- Best result: 8th (2014, 2016, 2018)
- Last updated on Unknown.

The Oman national handball team is the national handball team of Oman.

== Asian Championship record ==
- 2004 – 9th place
- 2014 – 8th place
- 2016 – 8th place
- 2018 – 8th place
- 2022 – 10th place
- 2024 – 12th place
- 2026 – 13th place
