= Chinese Taipei men's national handball team =

Chinese Taipei

Information
- Association: Chinese Taipei Handball Association

Colours
1st	2nd

Results

Asian Championship
- Appearances: 7 (First in 1987)
- Best result: 4th (2000)
- Last updated on Unknown.

The Chinese Taipei national handball team is the national team of Chinese Taipei. It is governed by the Chinese Taipei Handball Association and takes part in international handball competitions. It has competed in the Asian Men's Handball Championship six times, most recently in 2000.

== Tournament history ==
=== Asian Championship ===
- 1987 – 7th place
- 1989 – 7th place
- 1991 – 7th place
- 1993 – 10th place
- 1995 – 7th place
- 2000 – 4th place
- 2024 – 11th place
