= United Arab Emirates men's national handball team =

United Arab Emirates

Information
- Association: United Arab Emirates Handball Federation
- Coach: Rolando Freitas
- Assistant coach: Khalid Al-Balooshi; Mohamed Yassine

Colours
1st	2nd	3rd

Results

Asian Championship
- Appearances: 15 (First in 1977)
- Best result: 4th (2014)
- Last updated on Unknown.

The United Arab Emirates national handball team is the national handball team of United Arab Emirates.

== Asian Championship record ==
- 1977 – 9th
- 1991 – 6th
- 1993 – 8th
- 1995 – 6th
- 2004 – 6th
- 2008 – 9th
- 2010 – 11th
- 2012 – 7th
- 2014 – 4th
- 2016 – 7th
- 2018 – 7th
- 2020 – 5th
- 2022 – 9th
- 2024 – 7th
- 2026 – 8th
