= Iran men's national handball team =

Iran

Information
- Nickname: Team Melli
- Association: IRIHF
- Coach: Rafael Guijosa
- Assistant coach: Majid Rahimizadeh

Colours
1st	2nd	3rd

Results

World Championship
- Appearances: 2 (First in 2015)
- Best result: 21st (2015)

Asian Championship
- Appearances: 17 (First in 1989)
- Best result: (bronze) 3rd (2014)
- Last updated on Unknown.

Iran men's national handball team
Medal record

Asian Championship
Bronze medal – third place	2014 Bahrain	

Asian Games
Silver medal – second place	2010 Guangzhou	Team
Bronze medal – third place	2006 Doha	Team

Islamic Solidarity Games
Bronze medal – third place	2021 Konya	

West Asian Games
Silver medal – second place	2005 Doha	

The Iran national handball team is the national handball team of Iran and is controlled by the IR Iran Handball Federation. The Iranian national handball team is one of the best teams in Asia.

== Tournament record ==
=== World Championship ===
Year	Round	Position	GP	W	D	L	GS	GA
(Nazi Germany) 1938	Not an IHF member							
(Sweden) 1954	Not an IHF member							
(East Germany) 1958	Not an IHF member							
(West Germany) 1961	Not an IHF member							
(Czechoslovakia) 1964	Not an IHF member							
(Sweden) 1967	Not an IHF member							
(France) 1970	Not an IHF member							
(East Germany) 1974	Not an IHF member							
(Denmark) 1978	did not enter							
(West Germany) 1982	did not enter							
(Switzerland) 1986	did not enter							
(Czechoslovakia) 1990	did not qualify							
(Sweden) 1993	did not qualify							
(Iceland) 1995	did not qualify							
(Japan) 1997	did not qualify							
(Egypt) 1999	did not qualify							
(France) 2001	did not qualify							
(Portugal) 2003	did not qualify							
(Tunisia) 2005	did not qualify							
(Germany) 2007	did not qualify							
(Croatia) 2009	did not qualify							
(Sweden) 2011	did not qualify							
(Spain) 2013	did not qualify							
(Qatar) 2015	President’s Cup	21st place	7	2	0	5	185	225
(France) 2017	did not qualify							
(Denmark) (Germany) 2019	did not qualify							
(Egypt) 2021	did not qualify							
(Poland) (Sweden) 2023	Main round	24th place	6	1	0	5	150	198
(Croatia) (Denmark) (Norway) 2025	to be determined							
(Germany) 2027	to be determined							
(France) (Germany) 2029
(Denmark) (Iceland) (Norway) 2031
Total	2/30		13	3	0	10	335	423

=== Asian Championship ===
Year	Round	Position	GP	W	D	L	GS	GA
(Kuwait) 1977	did not enter							
(China) 1979	did not enter							
(South Korea) 1983	did not enter							
(Jordan) 1987	did not enter							
(China) 1989	Final round	8th place	4	1	0	3	106	114
(Japan) 1991	Placement 9th–12th	11th place	4	1	1	2	110	132
(Bahrain) 1993	Preliminary round	9th place	2	0	0	2	50	58
(Kuwait) 1995	did not enter							
(Japan) 2000	Round-robin	5th place	4	0	0	4	61	132
(Iran) 2002	Placement 5th–6th	5th place	4	2	1	1	104	96
(Qatar) 2004	Placement 5th–8th	7th place	5	2	0	3	131	138
(Thailand) 2006	Final round	4th place	5	2	0	3	122	110
(Iran) 2008	Final round	4th place	6	3	0	3	184	179
(Lebanon) 2010	Placement 5th–8th	7th place	6	3	0	3	161	146
(Saudi Arabia) 2012	Placement 5th–10th	5th place	5	3	0	2	124	115
(Bahrain) 2014	Final round	3rd place	7	3	3	1	215	171
(Bahrain) 2016	Knockout stage	5th place	7	5	0	2	199	184
(South Korea) 2018	Knockout stage	5th place	6	4	0	2	195	157
(Kuwait) 2020	Final round	6th place	6	2	1	3	176	151
(Saudi Arabia) 2022	Final round	4th place	8	5	0	3	221	206
(Bahrain) 2024	Final round	6th place	7	3	0	4	185	161
(Kuwait) 2026	Placement 11th–12th	12th place	7	3	0	4	189	143
Total	17/22		93	42	6	45	2,533	2,393

=== Asian Games ===
Year	Round	Position	GP	W	D	L	GS	GA
(India) 1982	did not enter							
(South Korea) 1986	Round-robin	5th place	5	1	0	4	90	185
(China) 1990	did not enter							
(Japan) 1994	did not enter							
(Thailand) 1998	Final round	4th place	5	2	0	3	126	146
(South Korea) 2002	did not enter							
(Qatar) 2006	Final round	3rd place	8	5	0	3	220	203
(China) 2010	Final round	Runners-up	6	4	0	2	185	156
(South Korea) 2014	Final round	4th place	7	3	0	4	188	164
(Indonesia) 2018	Classification 5th–8th	5th place	6	3	0	3	202	152
(China) 2022	Main round							
(Japan) 2026	Quarter-finals							
(Qatar) 2030	to be determined							
(Saudi Arabia) 2034	to be determined							
Total	7/11		37	18	0	19	1,011	1,006

=== Other tournaments ===
==== Islamic Solidarity Games ====
Year	Round	Position	GP	W	D	L	GS	GA
(Saudi Arabia) 2005	did not enter							
(Azerbaijan) 2017	did not enter							
(Turkey) 2021	Knockout stage	3rd place	4	3	0	1	121	85
(Saudi Arabia) 2025								
Total	1/3		4	3	0	1	121	85

==== West Asian Games ====
Year	Round	Position	GP	W	D	L	GS	GA
(Kuwait) 2002	Round-robin	4th place	5	2	0	3	148	139
(Qatar) 2005	Final round	Runners-up	5	4	0	1	137	127
Total	2/2		10	6	0	4	285	266

== Team ==
=== Current squad ===
Squad for the 2023 World Men's Handball Championship.

Head coach: Veselin Vujović

No.	Pos.	Name	Date of birth (age)	Height	App.	Goals	Club
2	LW	Mojtaba Heidarpour	20 September 1988 (age 38)	1.80 m	130	800	(Iran) Foolad Mobarakeh Sepahan
4	RW	Milad Ghalandari	23 August 1998 (age 28)	1.80 m	46	164	(Iran) Foolad Mobarakeh Sepahan
7	CB	Pouya Norouzinejad	23 June 1994 (age 32)	1.88 m	130	500	(Germany) VfL Eintracht Hagen
9	P	Yasin Kabirianjoo	2 July 1994 (age 32)	1.93 m	20	20	(Iran) Foolad Mobarakeh Sepahan
11	LB	Reza Yadegari	15 April 2000 (age 26)	1.96 m	0	0	(Iran) Mes Kerman
13	LB	Mehdi Mousavi	9 April 1989 (age 37)	1.88 m	200	200	(Iran) Mes Kerman
14	P	Salaman Barbat	16 December 1990 (age 35)	1.86 m	100	400	(Iran) Mes Kerman
16	GK	Mohammad Siavoshi	2 April 1985 (age 41)	1.95 m	130	0	(Iran) Foolad Mobarakeh Sepahan
18	RB	Saber Heidari	25 March 2004 (age 22)	1.91 m	14	20	(Iran) Foolad Mobarakeh Sepahan
22	GK	Ali Rahimi	6 January 1992 (age 34)	1.95 m	20	0	(Iran) Shahid Shameli Kazeroon
23	RB	Mohammad Reza Oraei	4 August 1999 (age 27)	1.94 m	25	40	(Iran) Foolad Mobarakeh Sepahan
24	CB	Mohammad Mehdi Behnamnia	2 December 1998 (age 27)	1.86 m	10	30	(Iran) Foolad Mobarakeh Sepahan
28	LW	Mohammad Reza Kazemi	20 January 2001 (age 25)	1.86 m	5	40	(Iran) Shahid Shameli Kazeroon
31	RB	Vahid Masoudi	1 May 1997 (age 29)	1.92 m	12	20	(Iran) Foolad Mobarakeh Sepahan
32	RW	Mohammad Kiani	10 October 1992 (age 33)	1.90 m	20	30	(Iran) Foolad Mobarakeh Sepahan
33	CB	Mehrdad Samsami	26 February 1991 (age 35)	1.94 m	152	89	(Iran) Shahid Shameli Kazeroon
44	LB	Afshin Sadeghi	25 March 1993 (age 33)	1.98 m	90	300	(Iran) Foolad Mobarakeh Sepahan
69	GK	Omid Reza Sarpoushi	9 March 1998 (age 28)	1.90 m	20	4	(Iran) Mes Kerman
77	LB	Shahab Sadeghzadeh	28 March 1994 (age 32)	1.92 m	80	100	(Iran) Foolad Mobarakeh Sepahan
99	P	Ali Kouhzad	19 December 1996 (age 29)	1.98 m	4	12	(Iran) Shahid Shameli Kazeroon

== Former coaches ==
- (Russia) Yury Klimov
- (Russia) Yuri Kidyaev (2009–2010)
- (Slovenia) Borut Maček (2010)
- (Croatia) Ivica Rimanić (2011–2012)
- (Spain) Rafael Guijosa (2012–2014)
- (Slovenia) Borut Maček (2014–2015)
- (Croatia) Irfan Smajlagić (2015–2016)
- (Iran) Mohsen Taheri (2016)
- (Iran) Alireza Habibi (2017)
- (Slovenia) Borut Maček (2017)
- (North Macedonia) Zoran Kastratović (2018)
- (Iran) Alireza Habibi (2019–2020)
- (Spain) Manuel Montoya (2021–2022)
- (Montenegro) Veselin Vujović (2022–2023)
- (Iran) Majid Rahimizadeh(2023–2024)
- Rafael Silva (2024–)

== Past squads ==
- 2006 Asian Games – Bronze medal

- Farid Alimoradi, Alireza Rabie Dolatabadi, Mostafa Sadati, Iman Ehsannejad, Hossein Shahabi, Ali Akbar Khoshnevis, Masoud Zohrabi, Peyman Sadeghi, Hojjat Rahshenas, Saeid Pourghasemi, Mohammad Reza Jafarnia, Hani Zamani, Mohammad Reza Rajabi, Allahkaram Esteki and Rasoul Dehghani. Head Coach: Yury Klimov

== Notable players ==
- Iman Jamali (later Hungary)
