= 2023 World Men's Handball Championship squads =

This article displays the squads for the 2023 World Men's Handball Championship. Each team consisted of 18 players, of which 16 were fielded for each game.

Age, club, appearances and goals correct as of 11 January 2023.

== Group A ==
=== Chile ===
A 20-player squad was announced on 27 December 2022.

Head coach: (Spain) Aitor Etxaburu

No.	Pos.	Name	Date of birth (age)	Height	App.	Goals	Club
1	GK	Réne Oliva	3 July 1987 (aged 35)	1.96 m	0	0	(Chile) Balonmano Ovalle
2	LW	Sebastián Ceballos	1 July 1992 (aged 30)	1.76 m	81	143	(Spain) CD Balopal
4	LB	Erwin Feuchtmann	2 May 1990 (aged 32)	1.90 m	86	461	(France) Fenix Toulouse Handball
6	CB	Arian Delgado	25 August 2001 (aged 21)	1.80 m	5	9	(Chile) Liceo Nacional de Maipu
9	P	Javier Frelijj	28 January 1991 (aged 31)	1.91 m	78	95	(Chile) Balonmano Ovalle
10	CB	Emil Feuchtmann	1 June 1983 (aged 39)	1.78 m	157	431	(Spain) CB Alicante
11	P	Esteban Salinas	18 January 1992 (aged 30)	1.83 m	93	350	(Spain) BM Granollers
12	GK	Felipe García	26 October 1993 (aged 29)	1.90 m	66	4	(Chile) Italiano BM
14	P	Benjamin Illesca	4 February 2000 (aged 22)	1.96 m	7	4	(Portugal) Boa-Hora
17	RB	Rodrigo Salinas Muñoz	25 February 1989 (aged 33)	1.89 m	115	403	(Spain) CD Bidasoa
22	CB	Matias Payá	31 March 2000 (aged 22)	1.76 m	0	0	(Spain) Canteras U.D.
28	RW	Luciano Scaramelli	23 April 2002 (aged 20)	1.82 m	0	0	(Spain) CD Balonmano La Robla
32	LW	Danilo Salgado	1 June 1998 (aged 24)	1.79 m	9	12	(Chile) DPV Kutral
44	LB	Aaron Codina	19 February 1999 (aged 23)	1.93 m	16	23	(Italy) Polisportiva Cingoli
55	RW	Francisco Ahumada	19 July 2001 (aged 21)	1.74 m	0	0	(Italy) SSV Bozen Loacker
77	LB	Víctor Donoso	27 November 1990 (aged 32)	1.90 m	78	61	(Spain) Club Balonmano Triana

=== Iran ===
A 23-player squad was announced on 22 December 2022.

Head coach: (Montenegro) Veselin Vujović

No.	Pos.	Name	Date of birth (age)	Height	App.	Goals	Club
2	LW	Mojtaba Heidarpour	20 September 1988 (aged 34)	1.80 m	130	800	(Iran) Foolad Mobarakeh Sepahan
4	RW	Milad Ghalandari	23 August 1998 (aged 24)	1.80 m	46	164	(Iran) Foolad Mobarakeh Sepahan
7	CB	Pouya Norouzinejad	23 June 1994 (aged 28)	1.88 m	130	500	(Germany) VfL Eintracht Hagen
9	P	Yasin Kabirianjoo	2 July 1994 (aged 28)	1.93 m	20	20	(Iran) Foolad Mobarakeh Sepahan
11	LB	Reza Yadegari	15 April 2000 (aged 22)	1.96 m	0	0	(Iran) Mes Kerman
13	LB	Mehdi Mousavi	9 April 1989 (aged 33)	1.88 m	200	200	(Iran) Mes Kerman
14	P	Salaman Barbat	16 December 1990 (aged 32)	1.86 m	100	400	(Iran) Mes Kerman
16	GK	Mohammad Siavoshi	2 April 1985 (aged 37)	1.95 m	130	0	(Iran) Foolad Mobarakeh Sepahan
18	RB	Saber Heidari	25 March 2004 (aged 18)	1.91 m	14	20	(Iran) Foolad Mobarakeh Sepahan
22	GK	Ali Rahimi	6 January 1992 (aged 31)	1.95 m	20	0	(Iran) Shahid Shameli Kazeroon
23	RB	Mohammad Reza Oraei	4 August 1999 (aged 23)	1.94 m	25	40	(Iran) Foolad Mobarakeh Sepahan
24	CB	Mehdi Behnamnia	2 December 1998 (aged 24)	1.86 m	10	30	(Iran) Foolad Mobarakeh Sepahan
28	LW	Mohammad Reza Kazemi	20 January 2001 (aged 21)	1.86 m	5	40	(Iran) Shahid Shameli Kazeroon
31	RB	Vahid Masoudi	1 May 1997 (aged 25)	1.92 m	12	20	(Iran) Foolad Mobarakeh Sepahan
32	RW	Mohammad Kiani	10 October 1992 (aged 30)	1.90 m	20	30	(Iran) Foolad Mobarakeh Sepahan
33	CB	Mehrdad Samsami	26 February 1991 (aged 31)	1.94 m	152	89	(Iran) Shahid Shameli Kazeroon
44	LB	Afshin Sadeghi	25 March 1993 (aged 29)	1.98 m	90	300	(Iran) Foolad Mobarakeh Sepahan
69	GK	Omid Reza Sarpoushi	9 March 1998 (aged 24)	1.90 m	20	4	(Iran) Mes Kerman
77	LB	Shahab Sadeghzadeh	28 March 1994 (aged 28)	1.92 m	80	100	(Iran) Foolad Mobarakeh Sepahan
99	P	Ali Kouhzad	19 December 1996 (aged 26)	1.98 m	4	12	(Iran) Shahid Shameli Kazeroon

=== Montenegro ===
The squad was announced on 31 December 2022.

Head coach: Zoran Roganović

No.	Pos.	Name	Date of birth (age)	Height	App.	Goals	Club
1	GK	Nikola Matović	8 May 1998 (age 28)	1.98 m	17	0	(Sweden) Amo Handboll
4	LW	Aleksandar Bakić	3 September 2000 (age 26)	1.93 m	27	34	(Croatia) RK Nexe Našice
6	LW	Miloš Vujović	5 September 1993 (age 33)	1.82 m	51	170	(Germany) Füchse Berlin
8	P	Vuk Lazović	10 March 1988 (age 38)	1.94 m	43	37	(Bahrain) Al-Najma SC
9	CB	Radojica Čepić	29 July 2002 (age 24)	1.95 m	28	42	(Germany) HSG Wetzlar
10	P	Miodrag Ćorsović	22 February 2000 (age 26)	1.98 m	9	5	(Slovenia) RK Trimo Trebnje
11	RB	Branko Vujović	20 April 1998 (age 28)	1.96 m	40	150	(Germany) TSV Hannover-Burgdorf
13	RW	Mirko Radović	15 June 1990 (age 36)	1.89 m	67	58	(North Macedonia) RK Eurofarm Pelister
16	GK	Nebojša Simić	19 January 1993 (age 33)	1.94 m	56	3	(Germany) MT Melsungen
17	CB	Vasilije Kaluđerović	3 October 1998 (age 28)	1.94 m	21	19	(Germany) 1. VfL Potsdam
20	CB	Stevan Vujović	7 April 1990 (age 36)	1.93 m	56	112	(Romania) CS Minaur Baia Mare
21	LB	Vasko Ševaljević	21 June 1988 (age 38)	1.93 m	76	282	(Sweden) Redbergslids IK
23	CB	Božidar Simić	14 June 1997 (age 29)	1.90 m	8	4	(Serbia) RK Metaloplastika
24	LB	Miloš Božović	10 December 1994 (age 31)	1.95 m	48	114	(France) US Ivry Handball
25	RW	Marko Lasica	30 April 1988 (age 38)	1.90 m	75	94	(Sweden) Redbergslids IK
26	RB	Risto Vujačić	4 December 1993 (age 32)	1.97 m	18	14	(Israel) Hapoel Ashdod
32	CB	Božo Anđelić	16 March 1992 (age 34)	1.86 m	53	90	(Ukraine) Motor Zaporizhzhia
90	P	Nemanja Grbović	26 April 1990 (age 36)	1.90 m	74	207	(Romania) Steaua București

=== Spain ===
A 22-player squad was announced on 12 December 2022. It was reduced to 19 players on 30 December 2022.

Head coach: Jordi Ribera

No.	Pos.	Name	Date of birth (age)	Height	App.	Goals	Club
1	GK	Gonzalo Pérez de Vargas	10 January 1991 (aged 32)	1.89 m	153	15	(Spain) FC Barcelona
4	P	Iñaki Peciña	31 May 1988 (aged 34)	2.00 m	38	22	(France) Pays d'Aix UC
5	RB	Jorge Maqueda	6 February 1988 (aged 34)	1.97 m	181	460	(France) HBC Nantes
6	LW	Ángel Fernández Pérez	16 September 1988 (aged 34)	1.93 m	101	301	(France) Limoges Handball
10	RB	Alex Dujshebaev	17 December 1992 (aged 30)	1.88 m	129	366	(Poland) Industria Kielce
12	GK	Rodrigo Corrales	24 January 1991 (aged 31)	2.00 m	111	4	(Hungary) Telekom Veszprém
14	RW	Ferran Solé	25 August 1992 (aged 30)	1.93 m	89	347	(France) Paris Saint-Germain
17	P	Adrià Figueras	31 August 1988 (aged 34)	1.93 m	109	293	(France) C' Chartres MHB
18	RB	Imanol Garciandia	30 April 1995 (aged 27)	2.01 m	26	58	(Hungary) OTP Bank-Pick Szeged
20	P	Abel Serdio	16 April 1994 (aged 28)	1.95 m	20	42	(Poland) Orlen Wisła Płock
21	LB	Joan Cañellas	30 September 1986 (aged 36)	1.98 m	217	529	(Switzerland) Kadetten Schaffhausen
25	CB	Agustín Casado	21 May 1996 (aged 26)	1.90 m	19	56	(Germany) MT Melsungen
30	P	Gedeón Guardiola	1 October 1984 (aged 38)	1.98 m	184	213	(Germany) TBV Lemgo
31	CB	Pol Valera Rovira	19 September 1998 (aged 24)	1.87 m	10	14	(Spain) BM Granollers
36	CB	Ian Tarrafeta	4 January 1999 (aged 24)	1.88 m	30	69	(France) Pays d'Aix UC
51	LW	Miguel Sánchez-Migallón	8 February 1995 (aged 27)	2.02 m	27	20	(Poland) Industria Kielce
59	LB	Daniel Dujshebaev	4 July 1997 (aged 25)	1.97 m	60	124	(Poland) Industria Kielce
62	RW	Kauldi Odriozola	7 January 1997 (aged 26)	1.83 m	36	112	(France) HBC Nantes
70	LW	Daniel Fernández	28 March 2001 (aged 21)	1.76 m	12	35	(Germany) TVB 1898 Stuttgart

== Group B ==
=== France ===
A 20-player squad was announced on 30 December 2022. The final roster was revealed on 11 January 2023.

Head coach: Guillaume Gille

No.	Pos.	Name	Date of birth (age)	Height	App.	Goals	Club
2	RW	Yanis Lenne	29 June 1996 (aged 26)	1.88 m	34	54	(France) Montpellier Handball
5	CB	Nedim Remili	18 July 1995 (aged 27)	1.95 m	99	299	(Poland) Industria Kielce
7	LB	Romain Lagarde	5 March 1997 (aged 25)	1.94 m	68	82	(France) Pays d’Aix UC
8	LB	Elohim Prandi	24 August 1998 (aged 24)	1.93 m	10	24	(France) Paris Saint-Germain
9	RB	Melvyn Richardson	31 January 1997 (aged 25)	1.90 m	58	126	(Spain) FC Barcelona
10	RB	Dika Mem	31 August 1997 (aged 25)	1.94 m	94	293	(Spain) FC Barcelona
11	P	Nicolas Tournat	5 April 1994 (aged 28)	2.00 m	68	133	(Poland) Industria Kielce
12	GK	Vincent Gérard	16 December 1986 (aged 36)	1.89 m	137	18	(France) Saint-Raphaël Var Handball
13	LB	Nikola Karabatić	11 April 1984 (aged 38)	1.96 m	337	1259	(France) Paris Saint-Germain
14	CB	Kentin Mahé	22 May 1991 (aged 31)	1.86 m	147	479	(Hungary) Telekom Veszprém
15	LW	Mathieu Grébille	6 October 1991 (aged 31)	1.98 m	79	121	(France) Paris Saint-Germain
16	GK	Charles Bolzinger	14 December 2000 (aged 22)	1.98 m	0	0	(France) Montpellier Handball
22	P	Luka Karabatic	19 April 1988 (aged 34)	2.02 m	130	155	(France) Paris Saint-Germain
23	P	Ludovic Fabregas	1 July 1996 (aged 26)	1.98 m	113	241	(Spain) FC Barcelona
28	RW	Valentin Porte	7 September 1990 (aged 32)	1.90 m	167	391	(France) Montpellier Handball
31	LW	Dylan Nahi	30 November 1999 (aged 23)	1.92 m	27	66	(Poland) Industria Kielce
39	LB	Thibaud Briet	14 December 1999 (aged 23)	2.05 m	13	12	(France) HBC Nantes
92	GK	Rémi Desbonnet	28 February 1992 (aged 30)	1.82 m	12	1	(France) Montpellier Handball

=== Poland ===
A 22-player squad was announced on 22 December 2022. The final squad was revealed on 7 January 2023.

Head coach: Patryk Rombel

No.	Pos.	Name	Date of birth (age)	Height	App.	Goals	Club
1	GK	Mateusz Kornecki	5 June 1994 (aged 28)	1.94 m	64	4	(Poland) Industria Kielce
3	RB	Michał Daszek	27 June 1992 (aged 30)	1.82 m	134	357	(Poland) Orlen Wisła Płock
4	CB	Piotr Jędraszczyk	9 October 2001 (aged 21)	1.77 m	19	33	(Poland) Piotrkowianin Piotrków Tryb.
5	CB	Michał Olejniczak	31 January 2001 (aged 21)	1.95 m	50	79	(Poland) Industria Kielce
6	RW	Krzysztof Komarzewski	18 September 1998 (aged 24)	1.88 m	18	26	(Poland) Orlen Wisła Płock
7	P	Patryk Walczak	29 July 1992 (aged 30)	1.98 m	54	48	(Portugal) Sporting CP
8	P	Bartłomiej Bis	25 March 1997 (aged 25)	1.95 m	14	8	(Germany) HSC 2000 Coburg
9	LB	Szymon Sićko	20 August 1997 (aged 25)	2.00 m	43	151	(Poland) Industria Kielce
12	LB	Ariel Pietrasik	21 October 1999 (aged 23)	2.02 m	19	28	(Switzerland) TSV St. Otmar St. Gallen
19	LW	Jan Czuwara	18 October 1995 (aged 27)	1.84 m	60	116	(North Macedonia) RK Vardar 1961
20	CB	Maciej Pilitowski	27 October 1990 (aged 32)	1.88 m	34	30	(Poland) Energa MKS Kalisz
23	RW	Arkadiusz Moryto	31 August 1997 (aged 25)	1.82 m	85	410	(Poland) Industria Kielce
26	LW	Przemysław Krajewski	20 January 1987 (aged 35)	1.84 m	154	368	(Poland) Orlen Wisła Płock
28	P	Maciej Gębala	10 January 1994 (aged 29)	2.00 m	79	95	(Germany) SC DHfK Leipzig
31	RB	Szymon Działakiewicz	17 February 2000 (aged 22)	1.90 m	11	19	(Sweden) Redbergslids IK
36	P	Dawid Dawydzik	7 December 1994 (aged 28)	2.00 m	46	61	(Poland) Orlen Wisła Płock
48	LB	Tomasz Gębala	23 November 1995 (aged 27)	2.12 m	44	134	(Poland) Industria Kielce
49	LB	Piotr Chrapkowski	24 March 1988 (aged 34)	2.03 m	144	175	(Germany) SC Magdeburg
50	GK	Jakub Skrzyniarz	6 June 1996 (aged 26)	1.89 m	9	0	(Spain) CD Bidasoa
94	GK	Adam Morawski	17 October 1994 (aged 28)	1.90 m	66	4	(Germany) MT Melsungen

=== Saudi Arabia ===
A 21-player squad was announced on 27 December 2022.

Head coach: (Denmark) Jan Pytlick

No.	Pos.	Name	Date of birth (age)	Height	App.	Goals	Club
1	GK	Amro Mohammed	28 June 1989 (age 37)	1.92 m	60	0	(Saudi Arabia) Al-Ahli Club
3	LW	Abdullah Al-Abbas	30 January 1992 (age 34)	1.69 m	21	55	(Saudi Arabia) Al-Noor Club
4	P	Hussain Al-Tarouti	2 November 1999 (age 26)	1.84 m	33	23	(Saudi Arabia) Al-Noor Club
5	P	Hassan Al-Janabi (c)	25 July 1983 (age 43)	1.86 m	54	66	(Saudi Arabia) Mudhar
6	RW	Hussain Furaij	1 July 2004 (age 22)	1.79 m	22	34	(Saudi Arabia) Al-Noor Club
8	CB	Hadi Quraish	25 February 1999 (age 27)	1.71 m	7	16	(Saudi Arabia) Al Safa
10	RB	Haidar Al-Hassan	12 November 2000 (age 25)	1.84 m	22	45	(Saudi Arabia) Al Safa
14	LB	Abdullah Al-Hammad	10 October 1990 (age 36)	1.88 m	23	44	(Saudi Arabia) Al Houda
15	RW	Ahmed Al-Abdulali	18 June 1988 (age 38)	1.84 m	41	55	(Saudi Arabia) Mudhar
16	GK	Mohammad Al-Salem	3 April 1986 (age 40)	1.89 m	42	0	(Saudi Arabia) Khaleej Club
19	RB	Abdulrahman Al-Muwallad	16 June 1994 (age 32)	1.92 m	18	60	(Saudi Arabia) Al Wehda Club
22	LB	Mahdi Al-Salem	16 February 1990 (age 36)	1.86 m	133	429	(Saudi Arabia) Al Houda
23	LW	Abdullah Al-Hulaili	16 June 1994 (age 32)	1.75 m	34	76	(Saudi Arabia) Mudhar
34	GK	Ali Al-Saffar	9 February 1995 (age 31)	1.85 m	14	0	(Saudi Arabia) Mudhar
37	CB	Mohammed Al-Abbas	19 December 1992 (age 33)	1.80 m	35	20	(Saudi Arabia) Mudhar
57	CB	Mojtaba Al-Salem	15 June 1994 (age 32)	1.81 m	6	7	(Saudi Arabia) Al-Noor Club
59	RW	Hassan Al-Turaiki	8 April 2004 (age 22)	1.77 m	25	31	(Saudi Arabia) Khaleej Club
77	LB	Marhoon Al-Maa	13 May 1988 (age 38)	1.89 m	23	35	(Saudi Arabia) Khaleej Club
89	P	Yousof Al-Taweel	7 November 1999 (age 26)	1.88 m	33	13	(Saudi Arabia) Al Safa
97	CB	Sadiq Al-Mohsin	23 October 1997 (age 29)	1.80 m	26	33	(Saudi Arabia) Khaleej Club

=== Slovenia ===
The squad was announced on 10 January 2023.

Head coach: Uroš Zorman

No.	Pos.	Name	Date of birth (age)	Height	App.	Goals	Club
1	GK	Jože Baznik	24 May 1993 (aged 29)	1.86 m	10	2	(France) USAM Nîmes Gard
3	P	Blaž Blagotinšek	17 January 1994 (aged 28)	2.02 m	110	203	(Germany) Frisch Auf Göppingen
8	RW	Blaž Janc	20 November 1996 (aged 26)	1.86 m	87	304	(Spain) FC Barcelona
11	RB	Jure Dolenec	6 December 1988 (aged 34)	1.91 m	169	621	(France) Limoges Handball
17	RB	Nejc Cehte	4 September 1992 (aged 30)	1.96 m	44	67	(Denmark) GOG Håndbold
19	LW	Staš Jovičić	6 December 2000 (aged 22)	1.85 m	2	12	(Slovenia) RK Trimo Trebnje
20	LW	Tilen Kodrin	14 May 1994 (aged 28)	1.92 m	60	94	(Germany) VfL Gummersbach
22	P	Matej Gaber	22 July 1991 (aged 31)	1.98 m	137	204	(Hungary) OTP Bank-Pick Szeged
25	P	Stefan Žabić	17 February 1999 (aged 23)	2.02 m	2	2	(Slovenia) Celje Pivovarna Laško
27	P	Kristjan Horžen	8 December 1999 (aged 23)	1.92 m	14	16	(Germany) Rhein-Neckar Löwen
29	LB	Gašper Horvat	10 April 1998 (aged 24)	1.99 m	2	3	(Slovenia) RK Trimo Trebnje
31	LW	Tadej Mazej	31 July 1998 (aged 24)	1.90 m	11	9	(Slovenia) Celje Pivovarna Laško
34	CB	Rok Ovniček	29 January 1995 (aged 27)	1.85 m	35	33	(France) HBC Nantes
35	CB	Domen Makuc	1 July 2000 (aged 22)	1.88 m	12	23	(Spain) FC Barcelona
44	CB	Dean Bombač	4 April 1989 (aged 33)	1.90 m	106	215	(Hungary) OTP Bank-Pick Szeged
47	LB	Aleks Kavčič	15 May 1996 (aged 26)	1.86 m	0	0	(Croatia) RK Zagreb
49	RB	Grega Krečič	25 April 1996 (aged 26)	1.88 m	0	0	(Hungary) Csurgói KK
51	LB	Borut Mačkovšek	11 September 1992 (aged 30)	2.04 m	125	315	(Hungary) OTP Bank-Pick Szeged
77	RW	Domen Novak	26 April 1998 (aged 24)	1.81 m	12	5	(Germany) HSG Wetzlar
88	CB	Aleks Vlah	22 July 1997 (aged 25)	1.91 m	20	40	(Slovenia) Celje Pivovarna Laško
90	GK	Urban Lesjak	24 August 1990 (aged 32)	1.87 m	59	0	(North Macedonia) RK Eurofarm Pelister

== Group C ==
=== Brazil ===
The squad was announced on 21 December 2022.

Head coach: Marcus Oliveira

No.	Pos.	Name	Date of birth (age)	Height	App.	Goals	Club
4	CB	João Silva	29 January 1994 (aged 28)	1.90 m	72	142	(Romania) Dinamo București
9	CB	Leonardo Abrahão	9 September 1996 (aged 26)	1.76 m	0	0	(Portugal) ABC/UMinho
13	P	Rogério Moraes Ferreira	11 January 1994 (aged 29)	2.04 m	52	115	(Germany) MT Melsungen
14	LB	Thiagus dos Santos	25 January 1989 (aged 33)	1.98 m	160	231	(Spain) FC Barcelona
16	GK	Rangel da Rosa	11 May 1996 (aged 26)	1.89 m	42	3	(Spain) CB Ciudad de Logroño
18	LW	Guilherme Torriani	6 February 1999 (aged 23)	1.86 m	24	29	(Spain) BM Granollers
19	RW	Fábio Chiuffa	10 March 1989 (aged 33)	1.87 m	165	431	(Spain) AD Ciudad de Guadalajara
26	RB	Oswaldo Guimarães	23 October 1989 (aged 33)	1.83 m	78	122	(Spain) CD Torrebalonmano
28	P	Matheus Francisco da Silva	7 February 1998 (aged 24)	1.98 m	5	0	(Spain) CD Bidasoa
35	LB	Thiago Ponciano	8 May 1994 (aged 28)	1.93 m	47	33	(France) US Créteil Handball
49	LB	Raul Nantes	20 March 1990 (aged 32)	1.95 m	78	273	(Egypt) Al Ahly
62	GK	Leonardo Terçariol	14 April 1987 (aged 35)	1.94 m	61	8	(Spain) Club Balonmano Benidorm
77	RW	Rudolph Hackbarth	10 March 1994 (aged 28)	1.89 m	56	135	(Spain) CB Ciudad de Logroño
83	LW	Hugo Monta da Silva	6 April 2003 (aged 19)	1.92 m	0	0	(Brazil) Pinheiros
95	RB	Gustavo Rodrigues	9 April 1995 (aged 27)	1.90 m	54	135	(France) Pontault-Combault Handball
99	LW	Jean-Pierre Dupoux	16 August 1991 (aged 31)	1.80 m	3	0	(France) Pontault-Combault Handball

=== Cape Verde ===
A 19-player squad was announced on 15 December 2022.

Head coach: (Serbia) Ljubomir Obradović

No.	Pos.	Name	Date of birth (age)	Height	App.	Goals	Club
1	GK	Luís Almeida	24 March 1994 (aged 28)	1.84 m	11	0	(Cape Verde) CDE Camões
3	LB	Délcio Pina	27 March 1992 (aged 30)	1.98 m	34	2	(Portugal) Madeira Andebol SAD
4	P	Ivo Santos	28 April 1992 (aged 30)	2.00 m	22	0	(Germany) Bergischer HC
5	LB	Edmilson Araújo	6 January 1994 (aged 29)	1.87 m	0	0	(Romania) CS Minaur Baia Mare
6	LB	Leandro Semedo	24 December 1994 (aged 28)	1.94 m	41	6	(Portugal) S.L. Benfica
7	RW	Flávio Fortes	20 September 1992 (aged 30)	1.94 m	23	12	(France) Grenoble SMH Métropole Isère Handball
10	RB	Bruno Landim	3 November 1992 (aged 30)	1.93 m	18	0	(Saudi Arabia) Al-Taraji Club
12	GK	Élcio Fernandes	23 September 1996 (aged 26)	1.96 m	16	0	(Spain) Balonmano Sinfín
13	P	Paulo Moreno	8 May 1992 (aged 30)	1.97 m	4	3	(Portugal) S.L. Benfica
16	GK	Edmilson Gonçalves	26 December 1993 (aged 29)	1.89 m	7	0	(Angola) Primeiro de Agosto
17	RB	Rafael Andrade	1 March 1996 (aged 26)	1.82 m	5	4	(Portugal) Póvoa Andebol Clube
19	RW	Admilson Furtado	30 September 1995 (aged 27)	1.77 m	16	12	(Portugal) Academico de Viseu
23	LW	Gilson Correia	23 April 1995 (aged 27)	1.75 m	7	0	(Portugal) Centro Cultural Recreativo Alto Moinho
29	P	Felisberto Landim	6 April 1993 (aged 29)	1.97 m	17	2	(Portugal) Vitória
30	CB	Elledy Semedo	21 March 1988 (aged 34)	1.87 m	13	85	(Luxembourg) Red Boys Differdange
44	CB	Gualther Furtado	6 February 1995 (aged 27)	1.85 m	25	5	(Spain) Club Cisne de Balonmano
88	LW	Nelson Pina	1 March 1985 (aged 37)	1.78 m	6	10	(Portugal) Belenenses

=== Sweden ===
The squad was announced on 13 December 2022. On 30 December it was announced Karl Wallinius would miss the championship due to a knee injury, and he was replaced by Olle Forsell Schefvert.

Head coach: (Norway) Glenn Solberg

No.	Pos.	Name	Date of birth (age)	Height	App.	Goals	Club
2	LB	Jonathan Carlsbogård	19 April 1995 (aged 27)	1.95 m	43	78	(Spain) FC Barcelona
5	P	Max Darj	27 September 1991 (aged 31)	1.92 m	95	96	(Germany) Füchse Berlin
10	RW	Niclas Ekberg	23 December 1988 (aged 34)	1.91 m	201	807	(Germany) THW Kiel
11	RW	Daniel Pettersson	6 May 1992 (aged 30)	1.79 m	65	149	(Germany) SC Magdeburg
12	GK	Andreas Palicka	10 July 1986 (aged 36)	1.89 m	140	15	(France) Paris Saint-Germain
15	LW	Hampus Wanne	10 December 1993 (aged 29)	1.85 m	69	279	(Spain) FC Barcelona
18	P	Fredric Pettersson	11 February 1989 (aged 33)	2.01 m	94	120	(France) Fenix Toulouse
19	CB	Felix Claar	5 January 1997 (aged 26)	1.92 m	47	95	(Denmark) Aalborg Håndbold
20	GK	Mikael Appelgren	6 September 1989 (aged 33)	1.91 m	94	2	(Germany) Rhein-Neckar Löwen
22	LW	Lucas Pellas	28 August 1995 (aged 27)	1.83 m	48	155	(France) Montpellier Handball
23	RB	Albin Lagergren	11 September 1992 (aged 30)	1.86 m	87	255	(Germany) Rhein-Neckar Löwen
24	CB	Jim Gottfridsson	2 September 1992 (aged 30)	1.91 m	132	426	(Germany) SG Flensburg-Handewitt
26	RB	Linus Persson	16 April 1993 (aged 29)	1.91 m	35	65	(France) HBC Nantes
30	GK	Tobias Thulin	5 July 1995 (aged 27)	1.98 m	36	0	(Denmark) GOG Håndbold
32	P	Oscar Bergendahl	8 March 1995 (aged 27)	1.92 m	31	48	(Germany) TVB Stuttgart
33	RB	Lukas Sandell	3 February 1997 (aged 25)	1.93 m	34	82	(Denmark) Aalborg Håndbold
42	LB	Eric Johansson	28 June 2000 (aged 22)	1.97 m	15	30	(Germany) THW Kiel
45	LB	Olle Forsell Schefvert	13 August 1993 (aged 29)	1.96 m	1	0	(Germany) Rhein-Neckar Löwen

=== Uruguay ===
The squad was announced on 31 December 2022.

Head coach: Nicolás Guerra

No.	Pos.	Name	Date of birth (age)	Height	App.	Goals	Club
1	GK	Felipe Navarrete	4 August 1999 (aged 23)	1.89 m	32	3	(Uruguay) Colegio Alemán
2	P	Gabriel Chaparro	20 February 1995 (aged 27)	1.93 m	55	24	(Spain) SD Atlético Novás
3	RW	Facundo Lima	13 April 2000 (aged 22)	1.75 m	8	10	(Uruguay) Pontevedrés Balonmano
11	CB	Diego Falabrino	8 November 1993 (aged 29)	1.78 m	7	0	(Uruguay) Pontevedrés Balonmano
13	RB	Máximo Cancio	24 February 1984 (aged 38)	1.90 m	30	131	(Spain) Balonmano Vetusta
14	LB	Bruno Borba	28 February 2002 (aged 20)	1.92 m	15	30	(Uruguay) Pontevedrés Balonmano
16	GK	Felipe González	8 December 1993 (aged 29)	1.89 m	62	3	(Spain) CB Maristas Algemesi
17	RB	Diego Morandeira	4 February 1993 (aged 29)	1.86 m	135	88	(Spain) Club Balonmano Mislata
18	P	Zion Ramos	18 October 2002 (aged 20)	1.87 m	6	12	(Sweden) HK Malmö
19	CB	Rodrigo Botejara	28 January 1993 (aged 29)	1.73 m	66	105	(Uruguay) Scuola Italiana di Montevideo
20	LW	Federico Rubbo	5 April 1989 (aged 33)	1.83 m	68	228	(Uruguay) Scuola Italiana di Montevideo
21	LB	Giovanni Capello	21 December 2001 (aged 21)	1.88 m	8	18	(Uruguay) Pontevedrés Balonmano
24	LB	Alejandro Velazco	24 October 1993 (aged 29)	1.83 m	77	308	(Uruguay) Colegio Alemán
36	LW	Cristian Rostagno	14 October 1995 (aged 27)	1.78 m	38	50	(Spain) Handbol Adrianenc
40	RB	Maximiliano De Agrela	19 October 1996 (aged 26)	1.83 m	27	44	(Uruguay) Club Malvín
74	LW	Guillermo Millán	7 July 1996 (aged 26)	1.74 m	22	20	(Uruguay) Scuola Italiana di Montevideo

== Group D ==
=== Hungary ===
A 19-player squad was announced on 5 January 2023.

Head coach: (Spain) Chema Rodríguez

No.	Pos.	Name	Date of birth (age)	Height	App.	Goals	Club
2	P	Adrián Sipos	8 March 1990 (aged 32)	1.98 m	50	26	(Hungary) Telekom Veszprém
5	RB	Csaba Leimeter	15 December 1994 (aged 28)	1.95 m	11	15	(Croatia) RK Zagreb
7	LW	Bendegúz Bóka	2 October 1993 (aged 29)	1.93 m	54	129	(Hungary) Balatonfüredi KSE
8	LW	Péter Kovacsics	13 June 1994 (aged 28)	1.90 m	5	7	(Hungary) Ferencvárosi TC
11	LB	Patrik Ligetvári	13 February 1996 (aged 26)	2.03 m	67	65	(Hungary) Telekom Veszprém
12	GK	Márton Székely	2 January 1990 (aged 33)	1.95 m	71	0	(Hungary) MOL-Tatabánya KC
16	GK	Roland Mikler	20 September 1984 (aged 38)	1.93 m	227	1	(Hungary) OTP Bank-Pick Szeged
20	P	Miklós Rosta	14 February 1999 (aged 23)	2.03 m	31	49	(Hungary) OTP Bank-Pick Szeged
21	RB	Zoran Ilić	2 January 2002 (aged 21)	1.97 m	3	1	(Hungary) Telekom Veszprém
25	RW	Pedro Rodríguez Álvarez	22 August 1990 (aged 32)	1.97 m	19	59	(Hungary) MOL-Tatabánya KC
26	GK	Kristóf Palasics	19 April 2002 (aged 20)	1.99 m	0	0	(Hungary) National Academy of Handball
27	P	Bence Bánhidi	9 February 1995 (aged 27)	2.06 m	84	247	(Hungary) OTP Bank-Pick Szeged
28	P	Szabolcs Szöllősi	28 January 1989 (aged 33)	1.94 m	82	109	(Hungary) Dabas KK
29	RW	Bendegúz Bujdosó	10 December 1994 (aged 28)	1.85 m	10	7	(Hungary) Ferencvárosi TC
30	LB	Zoltán Szita	10 February 1998 (aged 24)	1.96 m	43	106	(Hungary) OTP Bank-Pick Szeged
33	RB	Gábor Ancsin	27 November 1990 (aged 32)	2.02 m	131	273	(Hungary) MOL-Tatabánya KC
39	LB	Richárd Bodó	13 March 1993 (aged 29)	2.03 m	82	236	(Hungary) OTP Bank-Pick Szeged
66	CB	Máté Lékai	16 June 1988 (aged 34)	1.90 m	149	432	(Hungary) Ferencvárosi TC
77	CB	Egon Hanusz	25 September 1997 (aged 25)	1.77 m	21	33	(Germany) TV Bittenfeld

=== Iceland ===
A 19-player squad was announced on 23 December 2022.

Head coach: Guðmundur Guðmundsson

No.	Pos.	Name	Date of birth (age)	Height	App.	Goals	Club
1	GK	Björgvin Páll Gústavsson	24 May 1985 (aged 37)	1.93 m	244	16	(Iceland) Valur
2	RW	Óðinn Þór Ríkharðsson	23 October 1997 (aged 25)	1.83 m	16	55	(Switzerland) Kadetten Schaffhausen
3	CB	Janus Daði Smárason	1 January 1995 (aged 28)	1.86 m	58	83	(Norway) Kolstad Håndball
4	LB	Aron Pálmarsson	19 July 1990 (aged 32)	1.93 m	158	618	(Denmark) Aalborg Håndbold
6	LB	Elvar Ásgeirsson	4 September 1994 (aged 28)	1.98 m	9	17	(Denmark) Ribe-Esbjerg HH
7	RB	Viggó Kristjánsson	9 December 1993 (aged 29)	1.89 m	33	76	(Germany) SC DHfK Leipzig
8	LW	Bjarki Már Elísson	16 May 1990 (aged 32)	1.91 m	91	291	(Hungary) Telekom Veszprém
9	CB	Elvar Örn Jónsson	31 August 1997 (aged 25)	1.89 m	54	140	(Germany) MT Melsungen
10	CB	Gísli Þorgeir Kristjánsson	30 July 1999 (aged 23)	1.91 m	39	76	(Germany) SC Magdeburg
11	P	Ýmir Örn Gíslason	1 July 1997 (aged 25)	1.95 m	64	34	(Germany) Rhein-Neckar Löwen
13	LB	Ólafur Guðmundsson	13 May 1990 (aged 32)	1.94 m	137	269	(Switzerland) GC Amicitia Zürich
14	RB	Ómar Ingi Magnússon	12 March 1997 (aged 25)	1.86 m	66	216	(Germany) SC Magdeburg
16	GK	Viktor Gísli Hallgrímsson	24 July 2000 (aged 22)	2.03 m	35	1	(France) HBC Nantes
18	P	Elliði Snær Viðarsson	15 November 1998 (aged 24)	1.91 m	23	30	(Germany) VfL Gummersbach
19	LW	Hákon Daði Styrmisson	24 May 1997 (aged 25)	1.84 m	8	25	(Germany) VfL Gummersbach
20	GK	Ágúst Elí Björgvinsson	11 April 1995 (aged 27)	1.90 m	47	2	(Denmark) Ribe-Esbjerg HH
21	P	Arnar Freyr Arnarsson	14 March 1996 (aged 26)	2.00 m	71	81	(Germany) MT Melsungen
22	RW	Sigvaldi Guðjónsson	4 July 1994 (aged 28)	1.92 m	49	127	(Norway) Kolstad Håndball
23	RB	Kristján Örn Kristjánsson	25 December 1997 (aged 25)	1.92 m	21	29	(France) Pays d'Aix UC

=== Portugal ===
The squad was announced on 2 January 2023.

Head coach: Paulo Pereira

No.	Pos.	Name	Date of birth (age)	Height	App.	Goals	Club
4	RW	Pedro Portela	6 January 1990 (aged 33)	1.86 m	116	382	(France) HBC Nantes
8	P	Victor Iturriza	22 May 1990 (aged 32)	1.94 m	31	117	(Portugal) FC Porto
10	CB	Miguel Martins	4 November 1997 (aged 25)	1.92 m	76	177	(Hungary) OTP Bank-Pick Szeged
12	GK	Manuel Gaspar	9 December 1998 (aged 24)	1.93 m	16	0	(Portugal) Sporting CP
14	CB	Rui Silva	28 April 1993 (aged 29)	1.86 m	113	193	(Portugal) FC Porto
21	LW	Leonel Fernandes	12 March 1998 (aged 24)	1.91 m	22	40	(Portugal) FC Porto
22	P	Alexis Borges	6 October 1991 (aged 31)	1.98 m	49	93	(Portugal) S.L. Benfica
23	LW	Diogo Branquinho	25 July 1994 (aged 28)	1.85 m	75	174	(Portugal) FC Porto
24	LB	Alexandre Cavalcanti	27 December 1996 (aged 26)	2.01 m	60	75	(France) HBC Nantes
25	RW	António Areia	21 June 1990 (aged 32)	1.90 m	73	209	(Portugal) FC Porto
26	RB	Francisco Costa	16 February 2005 (aged 17)	1.83 m	4	16	(Portugal) Sporting CP
27	LB	André Gomes	27 July 1998 (aged 24)	1.92 m	46	120	(Germany) MT Melsungen
33	RB	Diogo Silva	2 July 1998 (aged 24)	1.98 m	10	8	(France) Pays d’Aix UC
35	GK	Miguel Espinha	20 July 1993 (aged 29)	1.90 m	3	0	(France) Cesson Rennes MHB
41	GK	Gustavo Capdeville	31 August 1997 (aged 25)	1.90 m	33	0	(Portugal) S.L. Benfica
79	LB	Martim Costa	27 September 2002 (aged 20)	1.88 m	4	18	(Portugal) Sporting CP
82	P	Luís Frade	11 September 1998 (aged 24)	1.94 m	42	62	(Spain) FC Barcelona
88	LB	Fábio Magalhães	12 March 1988 (aged 34)	1.94 m	167	335	(Portugal) FC Porto

=== South Korea ===
A 20-player squad was announced on 25 December 2022.

Head coach: (Portugal) Rolando Freitas

No.	Pos.	Name	Date of birth (age)	Height	App.	Goals	Club
3	RW	Shin Jae-seop	5 November 1999 (aged 23)	1.83 m	7	54	(South Korea) Hanam Handball Club
7	CB	Kang Jeon-gu	11 May 1990 (aged 32)	1.80 m	6	4	(South Korea) Doosan
8	P	Ku Chang-eun	23 December 1993 (aged 29)	1.90 m	26	48	(South Korea) Doosan
10	LB	Park Young-jun	28 January 1994 (aged 28)	1.88 m	0	0	(South Korea) Incheon Metropolitan City Corporation
11	LW	Jang Dong-hyun	13 January 1995 (aged 27)	1.80 m	0	0	(South Korea) SK Hawks
13	RB	Jo Tae-hun	30 June 1991 (aged 31)	1.83 m	33	72	(South Korea) Doosan
14	P	Lee Seong-min	14 December 1995 (aged 27)	1.92 m	0	0	(South Korea) Doosan
17	RB	Kim Yeon-bin	24 March 1997 (aged 25)	1.82 m	0	0	(South Korea) Doosan
26	RW	Kim Jin-young	2 February 2000 (aged 22)	1.85 m	8	49	(Spain) CB Ademar León
28	LW	Kim Gi-min	9 August 1994 (aged 28)	1.83 m	15	30	(South Korea) SK Hawks
33	RW	Ha Min-ho	23 January 1992 (aged 30)	1.90 m	0	0	(South Korea) Incheon Metropolitan City Corporation
34	CB	Oh Ju-an	23 June 1994 (aged 28)	1.86 m	0	0	(South Korea) SK Hawks
37	RB	Ha Tae-hyun	15 April 1994 (aged 28)	1.88 m	23	107	(South Korea) SK Hawks
66	GK	Kim Dong-wook	19 September 1997 (aged 25)	1.92 m	8	0	(South Korea) Doosan
71	LB	Lee Hyeon-sik	16 February 1992 (aged 30)	1.85 m	0	0	(South Korea) SK Hawks
77	CB	Lee Yo-seb	27 April 1998 (aged 24)	1.75 m	13	31	(South Korea) Korea Armed Forces Athletic Corps
79	P	Park Se-ung	18 March 1998 (aged 24)	1.88 m	9	33	(South Korea) SK Hawks
94	GK	Lee Chang-woo	27 April 2003 (aged 19)	1.90 m	8	1	(South Korea) Korea National Sport University
97	P	Jin Yu-sung	12 October 2000 (aged 22)	1.90 m	0	0	(South Korea) Korea National Sport University
99	GK	Park Jae-yong	20 March 1997 (aged 25)	1.92 m	13	0	(South Korea) Korea Armed Forces Athletic Corps

== Group E ==
=== Algeria ===
A 19-player squad was announced on 2 January 2023.

Head coach: Rabah Gherbi

No.	Pos.	Name	Date of birth (age)	Height	App.	Goals	Club
2	LB	Zoheïr Naïm	3 May 1996 (aged 26)	1.88 m	30	78	(United Arab Emirates) Sharjah Sports Club
4	LB	Noureddine Hellal	23 May 1996 (aged 26)	1.86 m	13	22	(Saudi Arabia) Mudhar
5	CB	Bounab Hani Abderrafik	20 December 2000 (aged 22)	1.88 m	0	0	(Algeria) JSE Skikda
7	LB	Hichem Daoud	9 January 1992 (aged 31)	1.89 m	105	155	(France) Limoges Handball
9	LB	Wail Melazem	14 September 2000 (aged 22)	1.90 m	0	0	(Algeria) MM Batna
14	CB	Benhalima Nori Selim	15 May 1998 (aged 24)	1.90 m	0	0	(France) Nancy Handball
16	GK	Yahia Zemouchi	17 September 1994 (aged 28)	1.93 m	16	0	(Kuwait) Al-Salmiya
17	LW	Djedid Yacine	6 April 1997 (aged 25)	1.84 m	8	25	(Algeria) MC Alger
18	P	Hichem Kaabeche	12 March 1990 (aged 32)	1.92 m	80	133	(Turkey) Beşiktaş
22	GK	Khalifa Ghedbane	26 November 1996 (aged 26)	1.98 m	52	5	(Romania) Dinamo București
25	P	Sofiane Bendjilali	28 March 1995 (aged 27)	1.89 m	13	13	(Greece) AC Diomidis Argous
26	LB	Mokhtar Kouri	29 February 1996 (aged 26)	1.94 m	18	39	(Algeria) HBC El Biar
27	LW	Abrous Rayane	16 August 2001 (aged 21)	1.91 m	0	0	(Algeria) HBC El Biar
36	CB	Rahim Abdelkader	12 July 1990 (aged 32)	1.85 m	102	211	(United Arab Emirates) Shabab Al Ahli Club
77	LW	Réda Arib	22 October 1991 (aged 31)	1.86 m	40	65	(Algeria) MC Alger
87	LB	Ayoub Abdi	16 February 1997 (aged 25)	1.89 m	47	139	(France) Fenix Toulouse HB
94	P	Bastien Khermouche	10 November 1993 (aged 29)	1.92 m	11	18	(France) Dijon Métropole Handball
97	RW	Sami Douchet	21 April 1997 (aged 25)	1.79 m	0	0	(France) Sarrebourg Moselle Sud Handball

=== Germany ===
The squad was announced on 23 December 2022.

Head coach: (Iceland) Alfreð Gíslason

No.	Pos.	Name	Date of birth (age)	Height	App.	Goals	Club
4	P	Johannes Golla	5 November 1997 (aged 25)	1.95 m	48	154	(Germany) SG Flensburg-Handewitt
15	CB	Juri Knorr	9 May 2000 (aged 22)	1.90 m	27	41	(Germany) Rhein-Neckar Löwen
17	RW	Lukas Zerbe	17 January 1996 (aged 26)	1.84 m	16	26	(Germany) TBV Lemgo
18	LB	Julian Köster	16 March 2000 (aged 22)	2.00 m	17	29	(Germany) VfL Gummersbach
19	RB	Djibril M'Bengue	13 May 1992 (aged 30)	1.95 m	9	11	(Germany) Bergischer HC
20	LB	Philipp Weber	15 September 1992 (aged 30)	1.94 m	64	152	(Germany) SC Magdeburg
24	RW	Patrick Groetzki	4 July 1989 (aged 33)	1.89 m	156	378	(Germany) Rhein-Neckar Löwen
25	RB	Kai Häfner	10 July 1989 (aged 33)	1.92 m	120	275	(Germany) MT Melsungen
33	GK	Andreas Wolff	3 March 1991 (aged 31)	1.98 m	126	13	(Poland) Industria Kielce
34	LW	Rune Dahmke	10 April 1993 (aged 29)	1.89 m	41	76	(Germany) THW Kiel
36	LW	Lukas Mertens	22 March 1996 (aged 26)	1.82 m	12	25	(Germany) SC Magdeburg
39	LB	Lukas Stutzke	14 January 1998 (aged 24)	1.95 m	6	7	(Germany) Bergischer HC
40	CB	Simon Ernst	2 April 1994 (aged 28)	1.95 m	54	39	(Germany) SC DHfK Leipzig
41	GK	Joel Birlehm	25 April 1997 (aged 25)	1.96 m	4	0	(Germany) Rhein-Neckar Löwen
44	RB	Christoph Steinert	18 January 1990 (aged 32)	1.95 m	13	30	(Germany) HC Erlangen
80	P	Jannik Kohlbacher	19 July 1995 (aged 27)	1.93 m	82	162	(Germany) Rhein-Neckar Löwen
95	LB	Paul Drux	7 February 1995 (aged 27)	1.92 m	115	207	(Germany) Füchse Berlin
96	P	Tim Zechel	28 September 1996 (aged 26)	1.93 m	4	5	(Germany) HC Erlangen
99	CB	Luka Witzke	3 April 1999 (aged 23)	1.92 m	12	23	(Germany) SC DHfK Leipzig

=== Qatar ===
A 23-player squad was announced on 1 August 2022.

Head coach: (Spain) Valero Rivera López

No.	Pos.	Name	Date of birth (age)	Height	App.	Goals	Club
1	GK	Rasheed Yusuff	16 October 1994 (age 32)	1.90 m	64	0	(Qatar) Al Sadd
4	LB	Nader Saleh Ahmed	26 May 1994 (age 32)	1.85 m	41	57	(Qatar) Al Ahli
6	RW	Mohammed Mahmood	2 October 1998 (age 28)	1.76 m	15	32	(Qatar) Al Sadd
9	LB	Rafael Capote	5 October 1987 (age 39)	2.00 m	88	336	(Qatar) Al Duhail
12	GK	Bilal Lepenica	26 December 1996 (age 29)	1.91 m	44	0	(Qatar) Al Duhail
13	RW	Eldar Memišević	21 June 1992 (age 34)	1.78 m	114	225	(Qatar) Al-Rayyan
17	RB	Jovan Gačević	14 September 1998 (age 28)	1.98 m	13	48	(Qatar) Al-Rayyan
23	RW	Allaedine Berrached	31 January 1994 (age 32)	1.86 m	74	178	(Qatar) Al Duhail
25	CB	Kamalaldin Mallash	1 January 1992 (age 34)	1.85 m	91	161	(Qatar) Al-Rayyan
27	RB	Bilel Messoud	25 May 2000 (age 26)	1.89 m	14	41	(Qatar) Al Ahli
31	LW	Ahmad Madadi (c)	31 August 1994 (age 32)	1.75 m	77	258	(Qatar) Al Duhail
32	LW	Ali Alderi	23 May 1989 (age 37)	1.86 m	18	40	(Saudi Arabia) Khaleej Club
37	P	Yassine Sami	1 May 1985 (age 41)	1.91 m	40	41	(Qatar) Al Wakrah
41	P	Youssef Benali	28 May 1987 (age 39)	1.93 m	87	262	(Qatar) Al-Arabi
44	P	Salem Anwar	5 May 1994 (age 32)	1.81 m	19	23	(Qatar) Al Ahli
55	CB	Abdelrahman Abdalla	1 January 1994 (age 32)	1.89 m	48	85	(Qatar) Al Duhail
86	LW	Mahmoud Hassaballa	22 November 1986 (age 39)	1.91 m	105	128	(Qatar) Al-Gharafa
88	CB	Moustafa Heiba	17 December 1996 (age 29)	1.84 m	66	168	(Qatar) Al Wakrah
90	CB	Ebrahim Shebl	14 April 1996 (age 30)	1.84 m	30	54	(Qatar) Al Sadd
94	LB	Ameen Zakkar	15 June 1994 (age 32)	1.98 m	79	110	(Saudi Arabia) Khaleej Club
98	GK	Anadin Suljaković	16 June 1998 (age 28)	1.96 m	21	0	(Germany) HSG Wetzlar

=== Serbia ===
A 19-player squad was announced on 30 December 2022.

Head coach: (Spain) Toni Gerona

No.	Pos.	Name	Date of birth (age)	Height	App.	Goals	Club
1	GK	Milan Bomaštar	10 July 1999 (aged 23)	2.00 m	9	0	(Sweden) IFK Skövde
3	RW	Vukašin Vorkapić	1 October 1997 (aged 25)	1.87 m	32	60	(France) US Ivry Handball
6	LB	Uroš Borzaš	28 July 1999 (aged 23)	1.88 m	16	33	(Norway) Elverum Håndball
11	LB	Ilija Abutović	2 August 1988 (aged 34)	2.00 m	44	22	(France) C' Chartres MHB
17	RW	Bogdan Radivojević	2 March 1993 (aged 29)	1.92 m	68	234	(Hungary) OTP Bank-Pick Szeged
19	LW	Nemanja Ilić	11 May 1990 (aged 32)	1.76 m	124	322	(France) Fenix Toulouse
20	P	Dragan Pechmalbec	5 January 1996 (aged 27)	1.94 m	8	21	(Hungary) Telekom Veszprém
21	LW	Vanja Ilić	25 February 1993 (aged 29)	1.85 m	56	145	(France) C' Chartres MHB
23	RB	Predrag Vejin	17 December 1992 (aged 30)	1.92 m	7	6	(Croatia) RK Nexe Našice
24	CB	Lazar Kukić	12 December 1995 (aged 27)	1.88 m	39	92	(Romania) Dinamo București
29	P	Ivan Popović	21 March 1994 (aged 28)	1.95 m	4	2	(Spain) CD Torrebalonmano
30	RB	Jovica Nikolić	18 November 2001 (aged 21)	1.92 m	14	36	(Germany) HSG Wetzlar
33	P	Mijajlo Marsenić	9 March 1993 (aged 29)	2.02 m	99	285	(Germany) Füchse Berlin
36	RB	Miloš Orbović	2 November 1993 (aged 29)	1.93 m	16	28	(Switzerland) HC Kriens-Luzern
39	LB	Marko Milosavljević	13 September 1998 (aged 24)	1.97 m	13	32	(Spain) CB Ademar León
40	CB	Stefan Dodić	13 March 2003 (aged 19)	1.96 m	4	2	(Croatia) RK Zagreb
44	LB	Petar Đorđić	17 September 1990 (aged 32)	1.97 m	45	128	(Portugal) Benfica
76	GK	Vladimir Cupara	19 February 1994 (aged 28)	1.99 m	61	4	(Hungary) Telekom Veszprém
96	GK	Dejan Milosavljev	16 March 1996 (aged 26)	1.96 m	55	2	(Germany) Füchse Berlin

== Group F ==
=== Argentina ===
A 19-player squad was announced on 1 January 2023.

Head coach: Guillermo Milano

No.	Pos.	Name	Date of birth (age)	Height	App.	Goals	Club
3	RB	Federico Pizarro	7 September 1986 (aged 36)	1.85 m	222	735	(Spain) BM Ciudad Encantada
5	RB	Pablo Vainstein	18 July 1989 (aged 33)	1.85 m	114	117	(Spain) BM Benidorm
6	CB	Diego Simonet	26 December 1989 (aged 33)	1.90 m	116	356	(France) Montpellier Handball
7	LW	Ignacio Pizarro	8 February 1990 (aged 32)	1.78 m	68	205	(Spain) BM Ciudad Encantada
8	CB	Pablo Simonet	4 May 1992 (aged 30)	1.85 m	117	252	(Spain) BM Ciudad Encantada
11	P	Lucas Moscariello	19 February 1992 (aged 30)	1.90 m	76	162	(France) Montpellier Handball
14	P	Franco Gavidia	25 September 1991 (aged 31)	1.97 m	92	3	(Kosovo) KH Besa Famgas
15	LW	Francisco Lombardi	5 December 1995 (aged 27)	1.75 m	7	13	(Spain) AD Ciudad de Guadalajara
17	P	Gonzalo Carró Castro	9 June 1994 (aged 28)	1.93 m	20	11	(Spain) Club Balonmano Nava
19	CB	Pedro Martínez Cami	20 December 1999 (aged 23)	1.91 m	24	49	(Argentina) Colegio Ward
20	RW	Ramiro Martínez	22 July 1995 (aged 27)	1.80 m	45	110	(Spain) BM Benidorm
22	RW	Facundo Cangiani	23 April 1991 (aged 31)	1.82 m	41	49	(Spain) BM Torrelavega
23	LB	James Parker	9 June 1994 (aged 28)	1.87 m	20	25	(Egypt) Zamalek
30	LB	Fabrizio Casanova	18 December 1993 (aged 29)	1.90 m	4	4	(Spain) BM Torrelavega
31	LB	Santiago Barceló	5 September 2002 (aged 20)	1.90 m	2	5	(Spain) BM Benidorm
40	GK	Leonel Maciel	4 January 1989 (aged 34)	1.92 m	98	12	(Portugal) Sporting
77	LB	Nicolás Bonanno	18 November 1991 (aged 31)	1.98 m	66	60	(Spain) SCDR Anaitasuna
87	GK	Juan Bar	29 June 1987 (aged 35)	1.90 m	51	2	(Spain) SCDR Anaitasuna

=== Netherlands ===
The squad was announced on 12 December 2022.

Head coach: (Sweden) Staffan Olsson

No.	Pos.	Name	Date of birth (age)	Height	App.	Goals	Club
1	GK	Bart Ravensbergen	14 March 1993 (aged 29)	1.90 m	78	7	(Germany) HSG Nordhorn-Lingen
3	CB	Ivar Stavast	13 January 1998 (aged 24)	1.91 m	19	17	(Germany) HSV Dresden
5	LW	Rutger ten Velde	5 March 1997 (aged 25)	1.78 m	41	85	(Germany) TuS Nettelstedt-Lübbecke
7	LB	Robin Schoenaker	23 August 1995 (aged 27)	1.96 m	32	7	(Belgium) Sporting Pelt
8	P	Evert Kooijman	28 January 1996 (aged 26)	1.96 m	29	33	(Netherlands) RKHV Volendam
11	RB	Iso Sluijters	24 July 1990 (aged 32)	1.92 m	96	190	(Switzerland) GC Amicitia Zürich
12	CB	Luc Steins	22 March 1995 (aged 27)	1.72 m	85	239	(France) Paris Saint-Germain
13	P	Samir Benghanem	10 December 1993 (aged 29)	1.96 m	50	82	(Netherlands) Green Park/Aalsmeer
14	RW	Bobby Schagen	13 January 1990 (aged 32)	1.90 m	112	352	(Germany) TBV Lemgo
20	RB	Niels Versteijnen	3 February 2002 (aged 20)	2.00 m	19	17	(Germany) TBV Lemgo
22	LB	Jasper Adams	3 July 1989 (aged 33)	2.00 m	99	205	(Netherlands) KEMBIT/LIONS
23	LB	Jorn Smits	3 September 1992 (aged 30)	1.93 m	57	84	(Denmark) Lemvig-Thyborøn Håndbold
24	LW	Jeffrey Boomhouwer	15 June 1988 (aged 34)	1.80 m	93	224	(Netherlands) Green Park/Aalsmeer
30	GK	Arjan Versteijnen	3 February 2000 (aged 22)	1.93 m	2	1	(Netherlands) Bevo HC
31	RB	Kay Smits	31 March 1997 (aged 25)	1.85 m	65	277	(Germany) SC Magdeburg
34	RB	Tom Jansen	8 June 1998 (aged 24)	1.99 m	17	34	(Germany) VfL Gummersbach
38	RW	Rob Schmeits	11 June 1994 (aged 28)	1.85 m	3	2	(Netherlands) KEMBIT/LIONS
77	CB	Dani Baijens	5 May 1998 (aged 24)	1.82 m	58	131	(Germany) HSV Hamburg

=== North Macedonia ===
A 23-player squad was announced on 14 December 2022.

Head coach: Kiril Lazarov

No.	Pos.	Name	Date of birth (age)	Height	App.	Goals	Club
1	GK	Nikola Mitrevski	3 October 1985 (aged 37)	1.88 m	125	6	(Portugal) FC Porto Sofarma
3	LW	Dejan Manaskov	26 August 1992 (aged 30)	1.82 m	74	279	(North Macedonia) RK Vardar 1961
9	CB	Igor Gjorgiev	2 June 2000 (aged 22)	1.91 m	6	9	(North Macedonia) RK Alkaloid
11	LB	Filip Taleski	28 March 1996 (aged 26)	2.00 m	55	131	(North Macedonia) RK Vardar 1961
12	GK	Martin Tomovski	10 July 1997 (aged 25)	1.94 m	17	0	(North Macedonia) RK Vardar 1961
17	P	Nikola Markoski	22 May 1990 (aged 32)	1.98 m	60	20	(North Macedonia) RK Alkaloid
18	LB	Filip Kuzmanovski	3 July 1996 (aged 26)	1.98 m	53	75	(Germany) TSV Hannover-Burgdorf
19	RW	Nenad Kosteski	4 March 2001 (aged 21)	1.89 m	5	7	(North Macedonia) RK Eurofarm Pelister
22	RW	Goce Georgievski	12 February 1987 (aged 35)	1.85 m	125	286	(North Macedonia) RK Vardar 1961
31	LB	Mihajlo Mladenovikj	21 September 2000 (aged 22)	1.90 m	6	0	(North Macedonia) RK Alkaloid
33	P	Žarko Peševski	11 April 1991 (aged 31)	1.95 m	60	85	(North Macedonia) RK Eurofarm Pelister
34	RB	Tomislav Jagurinovski	19 August 1998 (aged 24)	1.88 m	7	5	(North Macedonia) RK Tineks Prolet
38	CB	Ivan Djonov	15 July 1997 (aged 25)	1.95 m	2	3	(North Macedonia) RK Tineks Prolet
42	P	Marko Stojkovikj	27 June 2003 (aged 19)	1.92 m	1	3	(North Macedonia) RK Alkaloid
55	LW	Petar Atanasijevikj	9 July 2003 (aged 19)	1.92 m	0	0	(North Macedonia) RK Eurofarm Pelister 2
77	RB	Martin Serafimov	3 March 2000 (aged 22)	1.90 m	21	14	(North Macedonia) RK Alkaloid
79	RB	David Savrevski	16 June 2002 (aged 20)	1.99 m	0	0	(North Macedonia) RK Vardar 1961
88	CB	Pavle Atanasijevikj	9 July 2003 (aged 19)	1.95 m	2	3	(North Macedonia) RK Eurofarm Pelister
92	P	Kostadin Petrov	30 March 1992 (aged 30)	1.90 m	1	0	(Iceland) Þór Akureyri

=== Norway ===
A 20-player squad was announced on 12 December 2022. The final squad was revealed on 13 January 2023.

Head coach: Jonas Wille

No.	Pos.	Name	Date of birth (age)	Height	App.	Goals	Club
3	DF	Vetle Eck Aga	4 October 1993 (aged 29)	1.90 m	21	2	(Norway) Kolstad Håndball
5	CB	Sander Sagosen	14 September 1995 (aged 27)	1.95 m	139	708	(Germany) THW Kiel
6	LW	Sebastian Barthold	27 August 1991 (aged 31)	1.90 m	55	147	(Denmark) Aalborg Håndbold
7	CB	Sander Øverjordet	8 April 1996 (aged 26)	1.97 m	37	32	(Denmark) KIF Kolding
11	P	Petter Øverby	26 March 1992 (aged 30)	1.94 m	109	90	(Germany) THW Kiel
12	GK	Kristian Sæverås	22 June 1996 (aged 26)	1.97 m	55	3	(Germany) SC DHfK Leipzig
13	LB	Erik Thorsteinsen Toft	14 November 1992 (aged 30)	1.90 m	16	41	(Denmark) KIF Kolding
19	RW	Kristian Bjørnsen	10 January 1989 (aged 34)	1.92 m	167	611	(Denmark) Aalborg Håndbold
21	P	Magnus Gullerud	13 November 1991 (aged 31)	1.93 m	163	225	(Norway) Kolstad Håndball
23	LB	Gøran Johannessen	26 April 1994 (aged 28)	1.93 m	88	203	(Germany) SG Flensburg-Handewitt
24	CB	Christian O'Sullivan (c)	22 August 1991 (aged 31)	1.90 m	160	260	(Germany) SC Magdeburg
27	RB	Harald Reinkind	17 August 1992 (aged 30)	1.96 m	140	306	(Germany) THW Kiel
28	CB	Tobias Grøndahl	22 January 2001 (aged 21)	1.82 m	10	18	(Norway) Elverum Håndball
30	GK	Torbjørn Bergerud	16 July 1994 (aged 28)	2.00 m	118	0	(Norway) Kolstad Håndball
32	P	Thomas Solstad	26 February 1997 (aged 25)	1.90 m	24	35	(Denmark) Bjerringbro-Silkeborg
44	RW	Kevin Gulliksen	9 November 1996 (aged 26)	1.85 m	73	139	(Germany) Frisch Auf Göppingen
71	LW	Alexander Blonz	17 April 2000 (aged 22)	1.83 m	55	101	(Hungary) OTP Bank-Pick Szeged
77	RB	Magnus Abelvik Rød	7 July 1997 (aged 25)	2.04 m	69	144	(Germany) SG Flensburg-Handewitt

== Group G ==
=== Croatia ===
A 21-player squad was announced on 30 December 2022.

Head coach: Hrvoje Horvat

No.	Pos.	Name	Date of birth (age)	Height	App.	Goals	Club
2	LW	Lovro Mihić	25 August 1994 (aged 28)	1.81 m	40	52	(Poland) Orlen Wisła Płock
5	CB	Domagoj Duvnjak	1 June 1988 (aged 34)	1.97 m	229	731	(Germany) THW Kiel
10	LB	Jakov Gojun	18 April 1986 (aged 36)	2.03 m	166	80	(Croatia) PPD Zagreb
14	RW	Paolo Kraljević	31 March 2001 (aged 21)	1.87 m	0	0	(Croatia) PPD Zagreb
17	LB	Josip Šarac	24 February 1998 (aged 24)	2.01 m	20	9	(Germany) Frisch Auf Göppingen
18	CB	Igor Karačić	2 November 1988 (aged 34)	1.91 m	98	236	(Poland) Industria Kielce
28	P	Željko Musa	8 January 1986 (aged 37)	2.00 m	146	118	(Croatia) PPD Zagreb
31	RB	Luka Šebetić	26 May 1994 (aged 28)	1.98 m	40	35	(Germany) GWD Minden
33	CB	Luka Cindrić	5 July 1993 (aged 29)	1.83 m	86	229	(Spain) FC Barcelona
35	GK	Mate Šunjić	18 March 1987 (aged 35)	1.95 m	26	1	(France) US Ivry Handball
40	P	Nikola Grahovac	14 December 1998 (aged 24)	2.01 m	8	3	(Croatia) PPD Zagreb
43	GK	Dino Slavić	4 December 1992 (aged 30)	1.85 m	2	0	(Croatia) PPD Zagreb
48	GK	Dominik Kuzmanović	15 August 2002 (aged 20)	1.91 m	3	0	(Croatia) RK Nexe Našice
51	RB	Ivan Martinović	6 January 1998 (aged 25)	1.94 m	27	107	(Germany) MT Melsungen
52	P	Leon Šušnja	5 August 1993 (aged 29)	2.04 m	15	21	(Poland) Orlen Wisła Płock
53	P	Marin Šipić	29 April 1996 (aged 26)	1.90 m	44	84	(Switzerland) HC Kriens-Luzern
57	RW	Filip Glavaš	6 May 1997 (aged 25)	1.84 m	13	31	(Slovenia) RK Trimo Trebnje
58	LB	Zvonimir Srna	18 January 1998 (aged 24)	2.02 m	8	6	(Croatia) PPD Zagreb
62	LW	Marin Jelinić	7 December 1996 (aged 26)	1.94 m	12	28	(Croatia) RK Nexe

=== Egypt ===
Head coach: (Spain) Roberto García Parrondo

No.	Pos.	Name	Date of birth (age)	Height	App.	Goals	Club
1	GK	Abdelrahman Homayed	15 January 2000 (age 26)	1.92 m	0	0	(Egypt) Al Ahly
7	P	Shady Ramadan	21 November 1996 (age 29)	1.86 m	4	3	(Egypt) Zamalek
11	LW	Ahmed El-Nakkady	18 March 1993 (age 33)	1.76 m	58	45	(Egypt) Zamalek
15	LB	Ahmed Hesham	15 May 2000 (age 26)	1.91 m	49	60	(France) USAM Nîmes Gard
17	CB	Ahmed Khairi	15 September 1994 (age 32)	1.88 m	16	20	(Egypt) Al Ahly
24	P	Ibrahim El-Masry	11 March 1989 (age 37)	1.92 m	259	78	(Egypt) Al Ahly
31	LW	Omar El-Wakil	14 May 1988 (age 38)	1.74 m	215	288	(Egypt) Zamalek
39	CB	Yehia El-Deraa	17 July 1995 (age 31)	1.92 m	153	288	(Hungary) Veszprém
42	LB	Hassan Kaddah	1 May 2000 (age 26)	2.05 m	49	48	(Egypt) Zamalek
45	CB	Seif El-Deraa	19 September 1998 (age 28)	1.87 m	49	76	(Egypt) Zamalek
48	RB	Mohab Abdelhak	20 January 2003 (age 23)	1.91 m	12	38	(Egypt) Al Ahly
53	RW	Akram Saad	22 November 1994 (age 31)	1.72 m	44	132	(Egypt) Zamalek
55	RB	Mohsen Mahmoud	11 March 1998 (age 28)	1.92 m	37	58	(Egypt) Al Ahly
80	P	Ahmed Mesilhy	25 November 1994 (age 31)	1.84 m	18	15	(Egypt) Al Ahly
88	GK	Karim Handawy	1 May 1988 (age 38)	1.88 m	167	0	(Egypt) Zamalek
89	P	Mohamed Mamdouh Shebib (c)	1 April 1989 (age 37)	1.94 m	254	311	(United Arab Emirates) Sharjah Sports Club
90	LB	Ali Zein	14 December 1990 (age 35)	1.93 m	301	429	(United Arab Emirates) Sharjah Sports Club
91	RW	Mohamed Sanad	16 January 1991 (age 35)	1.88 m	162	401	(France) USAM Nîmes Gard
92	GK	Mohamed Aly	13 November 1992 (age 33)	1.84 m	12	0	(Spain) Balonmano Sinfín

=== Morocco ===
The squad was announced on 28 December 2022.

Head coach: Noureddine Bouhaddioui

No.	Pos.	Name	Date of birth (age)	Height	App.	Goals	Club
7	RW	Reida Rezzouki	7 August 1997 (aged 25)	1.84 m	33	101	Tremblay-en-France Handball
8	CB	Mohamed Bentaleb	1 January 1992 (aged 31)	1.90 m	54	109	(Morocco) AS FAR
9	LB	Mohamed Zaher	17 April 1994 (aged 28)	1.90 m	16	2	(Morocco) AS FAR
12	GK	Alae Laaroussi	20 April 1983 (aged 39)	1.90 m	61	6	(Morocco) Mountada El Fida
13	RB	Hicham El Hakimy	5 December 1989 (aged 33)	1.91 m	48	154	(Morocco) AS FAR
14	CB	Adam Arbaa	14 September 1999 (aged 23)	1.80 m	3	5	(France) Torcy Handball Marne La Vallée
16	GK	Jamal Ouaali	14 November 1999 (aged 23)	1.93 m	10	2	(Morocco) Raja d'Agadir
19	RW	Redouane Braout	29 December 1991 (aged 31)	1.80 m	34	39	(Morocco) Raja d'Agadir
20	LW	Ryad Lakbi	4 May 1999 (aged 23)	1.80 m	56	122	(France) Caen Handball
21	RB	Nacym Fougani	21 January 2002 (aged 20)	1.83 m	29	47	Tremblay-en-France Handball
24	LB	Mohammed Ezzine	24 February 1999 (aged 23)	1.90 m	35	266	(Morocco) AS FAR
46	CB	Amine Harchaoui	27 September 1990 (aged 32)	1.87 m	47	137	(Saudi Arabia) Al Wehda
89	LB	Yassine Belhou	26 December 1988 (aged 34)	1.81 m	12	25	(Morocco) Raja d'Agadir
92	LB	Hassan El-Kachradi	29 January 1992 (aged 30)	1.80 m	15	18	(Morocco) Raja d'Agadir
94	P	Mehdi Ismaïli Alaoui	4 January 1992 (aged 31)	1.91 m	59	66	(France) HBC Franconville
97	P	Saïd El Malki	17 May 1997 (aged 25)	1.98 m	37	95	(Morocco) Mountada El Fida
99	P	Nabil Slassi	19 September 1995 (aged 27)	1.94 m	38	65	(France) Caen Handball

=== United States ===
A 24–player squad was announced on 5 January 2023.

Head coach: (Sweden) Robert Hedin

No.	Pos.	Name	Date of birth (age)	Height	App.	Goals	Club
1	GK	Pal Merkovszky	5 May 2000 (aged 22)	1.98 m	4	1	(Hungary) Budai Farkasok KKUK
3	RW	Sean Corning	27 November 1996 (aged 26)	1.81 m	4	2	(Spain) CB Málaga
5	LB	Amar Amitović	16 July 2001 (aged 21)	1.96 m	4	5	(Bosnia and Herzegovina) RK Krivaja Zavidovići
6	RB	Jonas Strömberg	27 August 2001 (aged 21)	1.91 m	6	16	(Sweden) Lugi HF
7	CB	Alex Chan	26 April 1993 (aged 29)	1.88 m	4	18	(Spain) Club Cisne de Balonmano
9	LB	Gary Hines	21 March 1984 (aged 38)	1.80 m	75	700	(Germany) HSV Solingen-Gräfrath
10	RW	Ty Reed	18 January 1992 (aged 30)	1.90 m	72	215	(United States) New York Athletic Club
11	LB	Aboubakar Fofana	26 July 1996 (aged 26)	1.98 m	104	118	(France) Angers SCO Handball
12	GK	Rene Ingram	5 March 1999 (aged 23)	1.98 m	19	1	(Germany) TG Landshut
14	CB	Ian Hueter	22 October 1997 (aged 25)	1.96 m	26	62	(Germany) TSV Bayer Dormagen
16	GK	Douglas Otterström	16 May 2001 (aged 21)	1.85 m	0	0	(Sweden) Tyresö Handboll
17	P	Andrew Donlin	9 October 1992 (aged 30)	2.02 m	34	57	(United States) San Francisco CalHeat
19	LB	Maksim Tanner	31 May 2001 (aged 21)	1.91 m	0	0	(Estonia) HC Kehra
21	LW	Nikolas Zarikos	24 May 1998 (aged 24)	1.88 m	17	45	(Greece) ESN Vrilissia
25	P	Patrick Hueter	24 July 1995 (aged 27)	1.96 m	12	45	(Germany) TSV Bayer Dormagen
27	P	Paul Skorupa	7 September 1999 (aged 23)	1.93 m	11	0	(Germany) HSG Krefeld
33	LW	Samuel Hoddersen	10 June 1997 (aged 25)	1.83 m	4	27	(Germany) HSG Rodgau Nieder-Roden
34	P	Domagoj Sršen	31 December 1990 (aged 32)	2.02 m	10	0	(Croatia) RK Metković
48	RW	Maximillian Binderis	18 April 2000 (aged 22)	1.84 m	1	0	(Sweden) AIK Handboll
49	RB	Jakob Rysgaard Christiansen	2 May 2003 (aged 19)	1.87 m	4	1	(Denmark) Ajax København
99	GK	Nicolas Robinson	18 January 1999 (aged 23)	1.93 m	15	0	(United States) San Francisco CalHeat

== Group H ==
=== Bahrain ===
A 24–player squad was announced on 31 December 2022.

Head coach: (Iceland) Aron Kristjánsson

No.	Pos.	Name	Date of birth (age)	Height	App.	Goals	Club
1	GK	Muntadher Ebrahim	2 November 2001 (age 24)	1.87 m	16	1	(Bahrain) Al-Tadhamun
3	P	Ali Abdulla Eid	18 January 1991 (age 35)	1.77 m	80	141	(Bahrain) Al-Najma
7	LB	Jasim Al-Salatna	23 March 1989 (age 37)	1.85 m	65	40	(Bahrain) Al-Ahli
8	RB	Hasan Merza	18 June 1998 (age 28)	1.79 m	41	40	(Bahrain) Al-Najma
9	LW	Hasan Al-Samahiji	22 February 1991 (age 35)	1.76 m	85	264	(Bahrain) Al-Dair
11	LB	Abdullah Ali	1 August 1999 (age 27)	1.70 m	65	35	(Bahrain) Al-Ahli
12	GK	Hesham Ahmed	5 January 2003 (age 23)	1.65 m	15	2	(Bahrain) Al-Dair
14	RW	Qasim Qambar	21 August 2001 (age 25)	1.76 m	28	42	(Bahrain) Al-Najma
15	RB	Mohamed Abdulredha	27 September 1989 (age 37)	1.83 m	75	50	(Bahrain) Al-Najma
18	RW	Ahmed Jalal	31 January 1998 (age 28)	1.70 m	80	152	(Bahrain) Al-Shabab
19	P	Mohamed Merza	17 April 1987 (age 39)	1.87 m	97	70	(Bahrain) Al-Najma
21	GK	Mohamed Abdulhusain	12 August 1989 (age 37)	1.85 m	226	15	(Bahrain) Al-Najma
23	CB	Mujtaba Al-Zaimoor	8 May 2000 (age 26)	1.74 m	18	36	(Bahrain) Al-Shabab
66	LB	Komail Mahfoodh	28 April 1992 (age 34)	1.89 m	74	137	(Bahrain) Al-Najma
77	LB	Ali Merza	7 July 1988 (age 38)	1.84 m	178	372	(Bahrain) Al-Ahli
90	LW	Mahmood Husain	27 November 1999 (age 26)	1.72 m	33	25	(Bahrain) Al-Ahli
95	CB	Mohamed Mohamed	7 February 2001 (age 25)	1.79 m	68	110	(Bahrain) Al-Najma
99	CB	Husain Al-Sayyad (c)	14 January 1988 (age 38)	1.78 m	449	1133	(Bahrain) Al-Najma

=== Belgium ===
The squad was announced on 15 December 2022.

Head coach: (France) Yérime Sylla

No.	Pos.	Name	Date of birth (age)	Height	App.	Goals	Club
1	GK	Jef Lettens	12 August 1990 (aged 32)	1.93 m	73	0	(France) Fenix Toulouse Handball
6	RW	Pierre Brixhe	28 January 1998 (aged 24)	1.80 m	10	30	(Belgium) HC Visé BM
9	RB	Kobe Serras	1 April 2001 (aged 21)	1.83 m	22	32	(Netherlands) Bevo HC
10	RB	Raphael Kötters	21 January 2001 (aged 21)	1.94 m	15	22	(France) Istres Provence Handball
11	CB	Tom Robyns	14 May 1991 (aged 31)	1.82 m	78	162	(France) Saran Loiret Handball
13	LW	Nick Braun	26 July 2000 (aged 22)	1.81 m	15	30	(Germany) HSG Krefeld
14	RB	Serge Spooren	22 November 1993 (aged 29)	1.89 m	37	76	(Belgium) HC Achilles Bocholt
15	LB	Quinten Colman	15 October 1996 (aged 26)	1.90 m	22	33	(France) Dijon Métropole Handball
22	P	Yves Vancosen	22 May 1991 (aged 31)	1.90 m	41	69	(Belgium) HC Visé BM
23	CB	Bartosz Kedziora	21 December 1990 (aged 32)	1.89 m	28	59	(Belgium) KTSV Eupen
24	P	Simon Ooms	18 April 1994 (aged 28)	2.00 m	41	85	(France) US Ivry Handball
26	LB	Sébastien Danesi	26 July 2000 (aged 22)	1.87 m	12	25	(Belgium) HC Visé BM
29	LW	Yannick Glorieux	15 January 1996 (aged 26)	1.84 m	8	38	(France) Villeurbanne Handball
30	RW	Ilyas D'hanis	17 January 1996 (aged 26)	1.88 m	16	23	(Belgium) HC Achilles Bocholt
34	CB	Arber Qerimi	22 November 1990 (aged 32)	1.80 m	59	120	(Belgium) Hubo Handbal
41	GK	Arthur Vanhove	8 December 2001 (aged 21)	1.95 m	10	0	(Belgium) Hubo Handbal
42	P	Joris Gillé	19 April 1996 (aged 26)	1.95 m	14	22	(Netherlands) Bevo HC
44	LB	Jeroen De Beule	2 March 1991 (aged 31)	1.87 m	73	159	(Belgium) HC Achilles Bocholt
60	CB	Robbe Spooren	10 April 2001 (aged 21)	1.80 m	6	2	(Belgium) Sporting Pelt
80	LB	Louis Delpire	7 December 1998 (aged 24)	1.94 m	12	12	(Belgium) Sporting Pelt

=== Denmark ===
The squad was announced on 19 December 2022. On 16 January Michael Damgaard joined the squad. On 23 January Niclas Kirkeløkke joined the squad.

Head coach: Nikolaj Jacobsen

No.	Pos.	Name	Date of birth (age)	Height	App.	Goals	Club
1	GK	Niklas Landin Jacobsen	19 December 1988 (aged 34)	2.01 m	247	10	(Germany) THW Kiel
3	RB	Niclas Kirkeløkke	1 June 1988 (aged 34)	1.95 m	53	99	(Germany) Rhein Neckar Löwen
4	LW	Magnus Landin Jacobsen	20 August 1995 (aged 27)	1.97 m	104	209	(Germany) THW Kiel
7	LW	Emil Jakobsen	24 January 1998 (aged 24)	1.92 m	39	144	(Germany) SG Flensburg-Handewitt
11	CB	Rasmus Lauge	20 June 1991 (aged 31)	1.93 m	142	353	(Hungary) Veszprém KC
15	P	Magnus Saugstrup	12 July 1996 (aged 26)	1.97 m	58	129	(Germany) SC Magdeburg
18	RW	Hans Lindberg	1 August 1981 (aged 41)	1.88 m	281	776	(Germany) Füchse Berlin
19	RB	Mathias Gidsel	8 February 1999 (aged 23)	1.90 m	39	184	(Germany) Füchse Berlin
20	GK	Kevin Møller	20 June 1989 (aged 33)	2.03 m	70	7	(Germany) SG Flensburg-Handewitt
21	LB	Henrik Møllgaard	2 January 1985 (aged 38)	1.97 m	192	182	(Denmark) Aalborg Håndbold
22	CB	Mads Mensah	12 August 1991 (aged 31)	1.88 m	174	309	(Germany) SG Flensburg-Handewitt
24	LB	Mikkel Hansen	22 October 1987 (aged 35)	1.96 m	243	1261	(Denmark) Aalborg Håndbold
25	P	Lukas Jørgensen	31 March 1999 (aged 23)	1.93 m	2	11	(Denmark) GOG Håndbold
26	RW	Jóhan Hansen	1 May 1994 (aged 28)	1.90 m	71	145	(Germany) SG Flensburg-Handewitt
27	LB	Michael Damgaard	18 March 1990 (aged 32)	1.92 m	87	225	(Germany) SC Magdeburg
32	LB	Jacob Holm	5 September 1995 (aged 27)	1.95 m	69	190	(Germany) Füchse Berlin
34	P	Simon Hald	29 September 1994 (aged 28)	2.03 m	65	83	(Germany) SG Flensburg-Handewitt
38	RB	Mads Hoxer	6 December 2000 (aged 22)	1.95 m	4	7	(Denmark) Aalborg Håndbold
43	CB	Simon Pytlick	11 December 2000 (aged 22)	1.91 m	10	28	(Denmark) GOG Håndbold
64	LB	Lasse Møller	11 June 1996 (aged 26)	1.99 m	12	6	(Germany) SG Flensburg-Handewitt

=== Tunisia ===
The squad was announced on 9 January 2023.

Head coach: (France) Patrick Cazal

No.	Pos.	Name	Date of birth (age)	Height	App.	Goals	Club
1	GK	Assil Nemli	1 September 2000 (aged 22)	2.00 m	6	1	(Tunisia) Espérance de Tunis
6	P	Ghazi Ben Ghali	28 March 1999 (aged 23)	1.98 m	21	18	(Tunisia) Étoile du Sahel
10	CB	Bilel Abdelli	4 August 1995 (aged 27)	1.90 m	19	39	(Tunisia) Espérance de Tunis
17	LB	Oussama Rmiki	8 October 1996 (aged 26)	1.92 m	2	2	(Tunisia) Club Africain
22	LB	Youssef Maaraf	21 July 1996 (aged 26)	1.95 m	52	87	(Qatar) Al Arabi
25	CB	Abdelhak Ben Salah	25 April 1990 (aged 32)	1.84 m	58	120	(Tunisia) Espérance de Tunis
27	RW	Issam Rzig	14 September 1989 (aged 33)	1.81 m	49	180	(Tunisia) Étoile du Sahel
28	LB	Hazem Bacha	8 December 2001 (aged 21)	2.05 m	18	33	(Tunisia) Espérance de Tunis
29	RW	Tarek Jallouz	1 November 1993 (aged 29)	1.83 m	22	35	(Tunisia) Espérance de Tunis
55	LW	Ghassen Toumi	14 June 1997 (aged 25)	1.84 m	33	70	(Tunisia) Espérance de Tunis
57	RB	Noureddine Maoua	5 September 1998 (aged 24)	1.86 m	23	24	(Kuwait) Al Salmiya
61	GK	Yassine Belkaied	19 October 2000 (aged 22)	1.97 m	17	2	(Slovenia) RK Celje
69	P	Jihed Jaballah	29 July 1989 (aged 33)	2.04 m	103	211	Al-Kuwait SC
71	CB	Mohamed Darmoul	4 February 1998 (aged 24)	1.83 m	44	145	(Germany) GWD Minden
94	GK	Mehdi Harbaoui	11 September 1996 (aged 26)	1.96 m	27	0	(Spain) CD Bidasoa
96	RB	Anouar Ben Abdallah	20 June 1996 (aged 26)	1.88 m	50	73	(Kuwait) Kazma
98	P	Islem Jbeli	13 December 1998 (aged 24)	1.93 m	12	13	(Tunisia) Espérance de Tunis
