= Handball at the 2022 Asian Games – Men's tournament =

Handball competition

Men at the 2022 Asian Games
- Venue: ZJSU Sports Centre; ZJNU Xiaoshan Gymnasium
- Date: 24 September – 5 October 2023
- Competitors: 201 from 13 nations

Medalists
gold medal	Qatar
silver medal	Bahrain
bronze medal	Kuwait

The men's tournament of Handball at the 2022 Asian Games at Hangzhou, China, was held from 24 September to 5 October 2023.

== Squads ==
Bahrain	China	Hong Kong	Iran
Ali Abdulla Eid; Hasan Al-Samahiji; Mohamed Hameed Rabia; Hesham Ahmed; Qasim Qambar; Mohamed Abdulredha; Ahmed Jalal; Mohamed Merza; Mohamed Abdulhusain; Hasan Madan; Ali Merza; Hasan Merza; Mahdi Saad; Mohamed Habib; Mohamed Habib Naser; Husain Al-Sayyad	Zhang Tianjin; He Zheng; Sun Fangwei; Xie Qinglong; Cheng Haijin; Zhao Wenxuan; Wang Quan; Zhang Jianjie; He Xinian; Hu Jinming; Li Shuang; Liu Zhaoliang; Huang Peijie; Chen Xu; Rao Yuanyuan; Zhu Shijie	Kenny Wong; Chan Tsz Long; Wong Ling Chung; Tse Wing Fai; Lee Siu Chung; Eddy Ip; Wong Chun Ho; Chow Kam Lun; Chan Ho Yin; Leung Laam Hei; Kuo Sze Ming; Cheung Ka Ho; Lau Kin Pan; Wong Kin; Kan Yik Fai; Kan Yik Man	Mojtaba Heidarpour; Milad Ghalandari; Hossein Jahani; Yasin Kabirianjoo; Kiarash Taheri; Reza Yadegari; Mohammad Siavoshi; Mehran Rahnama; Younes Asari; Ali Shirani; Ali Rahimi; Mehdi Behnamnia; Mohammad Reza Kazemi; Afshin Sadeghi; Shahab Sadeghzadeh; Ali Kouhzad
Japan	Kazakhstan	Kuwait	Mongolia
Motoki Sakai; Kenya Kasahara; Kohei Narita; Hiroki Motoki; Yuto Agarie; Naoki Sugioka; Tatsuki Yoshino; Hiroyasu Tamakawa; Shinnosuke Tokuda; Takumi Nakamura; Shinya Yamada; Adam Yuki Baig; Shuto Kawahara; Daiki Kani; Taiga Tsutaya; Shin Izumoto	Bekzat Anarbayev; Yerzhan Kenzhebayev; Artyom Melnichenko; Aibek Turanov; Konstantin Milyayev; Kuanbay Kuantyr; Askan Oxikbayev; Daniil Yakubovich; Odilzhan Gaziyev; Assylkhan Nabiyev; Dauren Tilekkabyl; Asset Kali; Miras Kaldykhan; Dilmurad Yuldashev; Ilya Pobochenko; Daniyar Irismetov	Abdullah Al-Khamees; Saleh Al-Musawi; Abdulaziz Al-Shammari; Fahad Slbokh; Mohammad Al-Sanea; Mohammad Al-Hendal; Mishaal Al-Harbi; Hasan Safar; Abdulaziz Naseeb; Fawaz Mubarak; Mohammad Qambar; Abdulaziz Salmeen; Abdulrahman Al-Shammari; Haider Dashti; Yousef Zayef; Mohammad Buyabes	Pürevboldyn Altansoyombo; Mönkhbaataryn Baljinnyam; Nasanjargalyn Ganchödör; Batmönkhiin Bayarjargal; Battsengeliin Mönkhbat; Dashdelgeriin Tsogtbayar; Urtnasany Baatarsükh; Sanjjavyn Batkhuyag; Ganboldyn Lkhagvatsend
Qatar	Saudi Arabia	South Korea	Thailand
Ahmad Madadi; Rafael Capote; Frankis Carol; Abdulrazzaq Murad; Bilal Lepenica; Eldar Memišević; Irhad Alihodžić; Amir Denguir; Abdelrahman Abdalla; Allaedine Berrached; Wajdi Sinen; Yassine Sami; Youssef Benali; Amine Guehis; Moustafa Heiba; Ameen Zakkar	Hassan Al-Janabi; Jehad Abualwah; Abdullah Al-Hammad; Ahmed Al-Abdulali; Mahdi Al-Salem; Abdullah Al-Hulaili; Ali Al-Tarouti; Ali Al-Saffar; Mohammed Al-Abbas; Haidar Al-Hassan; Abdullah Al-Abbas; Haidar Al-Khadrawi; Marhoon Al-Maa; Hussain Furaij; Sadiq Al-Mohsin; Abbas Al-Saffar	Shin Jae-seop; Kang Jeon-gu; Ku Chang-eun; Park Young-jun; Jang Dong-hyun; Jo Tae-hun; Song Jea-woo; Park Kwang-soon; Kim Jin-young; Lee Yo-seb; Ha Min-ho; Lee Seong-min; Kim Dong-uk; Lee Hyeon-sik; Lee Chang-woo; Park Se-ung	Thanawat Sanyamud; Kanin Deetalod; Kajonwit Saengsan; Sudthawee Prueprak; Atsawamethee Barameechuay; Kong Srathongdee; Sarawut Rungruangnara; Tanakorn Ekchiaochan; Samarn Saelee; Pattana Changtom; Theephop Puapan; Teerapat Taotiamton; Yothin Limwongphatthana; Pongsaphatchai Doungsuwan; Wannapong Phumphio; Sitthipong Saneha
Uzbekistan			
Jasurbek Abdullaev; Gayrat Baratov; Akromali Yangiboev; Mukhtor Tuliboev; Elyor Eshboev; Jakhongir Zaripov; Sindor Farkhodov; Azizbek Alimbekov; Dilshod Turapov; Shokhrukhbek Takhirov; Nikita Shcherbakov; Rakhat Joldasbaev; Rajabboy Islomov; Yusuf Akhmedov; Khushnudbek Khusinov; Sardor Elmuratov			

== Results ==
All times are China Standard Time (UTC+08:00)

=== Preliminary round ===
==== Group A ====
Pos	Team	Pld	W	D	L	GF	GA	GD	Pts	Qualification
1	Kuwait	2	2	0	0	76	43	+33	4	Main round
2	China	2	1	0	1	64	44	+20	2	Main round
3	Thailand	2	0	0	2	36	89	−53	0	

Source: AHF

24 September; 18:00	Thailand	17–40	China	ZJSU Sports Centre, Hangzhou; Referees: Al-Wahibi, Al-Shahi (OMA)
24 September; 18:00	Saengsan 8	(11–20)	Zhang J. 8	ZJSU Sports Centre, Hangzhou; Referees: Al-Wahibi, Al-Shahi (OMA)
24 September; 18:00	2× (suspension) 1× (red card)		4× (suspension)	ZJSU Sports Centre, Hangzhou; Referees: Al-Wahibi, Al-Shahi (OMA)

25 September; 12:00	Kuwait	49–19	Thailand	ZJSU Sports Centre, Hangzhou; Referees: Al-Marhoon, Al-Mawt (BHR)
25 September; 12:00	Al-Hendal 8	(24–8)	Saengsan 6	ZJSU Sports Centre, Hangzhou; Referees: Al-Marhoon, Al-Mawt (BHR)
25 September; 12:00	1× (yellow card) 6× (suspension)		4× (suspension)	ZJSU Sports Centre, Hangzhou; Referees: Al-Marhoon, Al-Mawt (BHR)

27 September; 18:00	China	24–27	Kuwait	ZJSU Sports Centre, Hangzhou; Referees: Furukawa, Murata (JPN)
27 September; 18:00	Zhang J., Rao 5	(13–14)	Al-Khamees 6	ZJSU Sports Centre, Hangzhou; Referees: Furukawa, Murata (JPN)
27 September; 18:00	1× (yellow card) 3× (suspension)		1× (yellow card) 5× (suspension) 1× (red card)	ZJSU Sports Centre, Hangzhou; Referees: Furukawa, Murata (JPN)

==== Group B ====
Pos	Team	Pld	W	D	L	GF	GA	GD	Pts	Qualification
1	Qatar	2	2	0	0	67	45	+22	4	Main round
2	South Korea	2	1	0	1	59	45	+14	2	Main round
3	Hong Kong	2	0	0	2	32	68	−36	0	

Source: AHF

24 September; 14:00	Hong Kong	18–36	Qatar	ZJSU Sports Centre, Hangzhou; Referees: Faraj, Taqi (KUW)
24 September; 14:00	Kuo, Wong Ki., Kan Y.M. 4	(11–20)	Madadi 8	ZJSU Sports Centre, Hangzhou; Referees: Faraj, Taqi (KUW)
24 September; 14:00	4× (suspension)		3× (suspension)	ZJSU Sports Centre, Hangzhou; Referees: Faraj, Taqi (KUW)

25 September; 12:00	South Korea	32–14	Hong Kong	ZJNU Xiaoshan Gymnasium, Hangzhou; Referees: Al-Naseem, Al-Enezi (KUW)
25 September; 12:00	Shin, Jang, Song 5	(17–6)	Wong C., Kan Y.M. 3	ZJNU Xiaoshan Gymnasium, Hangzhou; Referees: Al-Naseem, Al-Enezi (KUW)
25 September; 12:00	3× (suspension)		1× (yellow card) 6× (suspension)	ZJNU Xiaoshan Gymnasium, Hangzhou; Referees: Al-Naseem, Al-Enezi (KUW)

27 September; 16:00	Qatar	31–27	South Korea	ZJSU Sports Centre, Hangzhou; Referees: Tavakkoli, Valadkhanian (IRI)
27 September; 16:00	Capote 7	(16–12)	Shin, Song 4	ZJSU Sports Centre, Hangzhou; Referees: Tavakkoli, Valadkhanian (IRI)
27 September; 16:00	4× (suspension)		1× (yellow card) 4× (suspension)	ZJSU Sports Centre, Hangzhou; Referees: Tavakkoli, Valadkhanian (IRI)

==== Group C ====
Pos	Team	Pld	W	D	L	GF	GA	GD	Pts	Qualification
1	Bahrain	2	2	0	0	92	47	+45	4	Main round
2	Kazakhstan	2	1	0	1	53	72	−19	2	Main round
3	Uzbekistan	2	0	0	2	52	78	−26	0	

Source: AHF

24 September; 12:00	Kazakhstan	22–45	Bahrain	ZJNU Xiaoshan Gymnasium, Hangzhou; Referees: Al-Zayyat, Awwad (JOR)
24 September; 12:00	Melnichenko 7	(11–22)	Qambar 7	ZJNU Xiaoshan Gymnasium, Hangzhou; Referees: Al-Zayyat, Awwad (JOR)
24 September; 12:00	1× (suspension)		1× (yellow card) 5× (suspension)	ZJNU Xiaoshan Gymnasium, Hangzhou; Referees: Al-Zayyat, Awwad (JOR)

25 September; 14:00	Uzbekistan	27–31	Kazakhstan	ZJSU Sports Centre, Hangzhou; Referees: Murata, Furukawa (JPN)
25 September; 14:00	Yangiboev 7	(11–15)	Oxikbayev 8	ZJSU Sports Centre, Hangzhou; Referees: Murata, Furukawa (JPN)
25 September; 14:00	4× (suspension)		1× (yellow card) 5× (suspension)	ZJSU Sports Centre, Hangzhou; Referees: Murata, Furukawa (JPN)

27 September; 12:00	Bahrain	47–25	Uzbekistan	ZJSU Sports Centre, Hangzhou; Referees: Lee, Lee (KOR)
27 September; 12:00	Saad, Al-Sayyad 7	(25–8)	Zaripov 7	ZJSU Sports Centre, Hangzhou; Referees: Lee, Lee (KOR)
27 September; 12:00	4× (suspension)		1× (suspension)	ZJSU Sports Centre, Hangzhou; Referees: Lee, Lee (KOR)

==== Group D ====
Pos	Team	Pld	W	D	L	GF	GA	GD	Pts	Qualification
1	Japan	3	3	0	0	124	66	+58	6	Main round
2	Iran	3	1	1	1	94	72	+22	3 (Note: Head-to-head result: IRI 23–23 KSA. Overall goal difference was used as the tiebreaker.)	Main round
3	Saudi Arabia	3	1	1	1	97	76	+21	3	
4	Mongolia	3	0	0	3	47	148	−101	0	

Source: AHF
Notes:

24 September; 12:00	Mongolia	16–50	Iran	ZJSU Sports Centre, Hangzhou; Referees: Cheng, Zhou (CHN)
24 September; 12:00	Batkhuyag 5	(7–30)	Heidarpour 7	ZJSU Sports Centre, Hangzhou; Referees: Cheng, Zhou (CHN)
24 September; 12:00	6× (suspension)		2× (suspension)	ZJSU Sports Centre, Hangzhou; Referees: Cheng, Zhou (CHN)

24 September; 16:00	Japan	38–29	Saudi Arabia	ZJSU Sports Centre, Hangzhou; Referees: Lee, Koo (KOR)
24 September; 16:00	Sugioka 7	(20–14)	A. Al-Abbas 5	ZJSU Sports Centre, Hangzhou; Referees: Lee, Koo (KOR)
24 September; 16:00	4× (suspension)		1× (yellow card) 3× (suspension)	ZJSU Sports Centre, Hangzhou; Referees: Lee, Koo (KOR)

25 September; 16:00	Mongolia	15–45	Saudi Arabia	ZJSU Sports Centre, Hangzhou; Referees: Lee, Lee (KOR)
25 September; 16:00	Baljinnyam 6	(9–19)	Furaij 8	ZJSU Sports Centre, Hangzhou; Referees: Lee, Lee (KOR)
25 September; 16:00	5× (suspension)			ZJSU Sports Centre, Hangzhou; Referees: Lee, Lee (KOR)

25 September; 18:00	Japan	33–21	Iran	ZJSU Sports Centre, Hangzhou; Referees: Shakir, Kadhim (IRQ)
25 September; 18:00	Sugioka 8	(13–8)	Heidarpour 5	ZJSU Sports Centre, Hangzhou; Referees: Shakir, Kadhim (IRQ)
25 September; 18:00	1× (yellow card) 4× (suspension)		1× (yellow card) 3× (suspension)	ZJSU Sports Centre, Hangzhou; Referees: Shakir, Kadhim (IRQ)

27 September; 11:00	Mongolia	16–53	Japan	ZJNU Xiaoshan Gymnasium, Hangzhou; Referees: Ghofli, Hassanzadeh (IRI)
27 September; 11:00	Lkhagvatsend 9	(11–28)	Agarie, Izumoto 11	ZJNU Xiaoshan Gymnasium, Hangzhou; Referees: Ghofli, Hassanzadeh (IRI)
27 September; 11:00	6× (suspension)		1× (suspension)	ZJNU Xiaoshan Gymnasium, Hangzhou; Referees: Ghofli, Hassanzadeh (IRI)

27 September; 14:00	Saudi Arabia	23–23	Iran	ZJSU Sports Centre, Hangzhou; Referees: Cheng, Zhou (CHN)
27 September; 14:00	Al-Abdulali, Al-Hassan 4	(14–15)	Heidarpour 5	ZJSU Sports Centre, Hangzhou; Referees: Cheng, Zhou (CHN)
27 September; 14:00	1× (yellow card) 3× (suspension) 1× (red card)		1× (yellow card) 7× (suspension)	ZJSU Sports Centre, Hangzhou; Referees: Cheng, Zhou (CHN)

=== Main round ===
==== Group I ====
Pos	Team	Pld	W	D	L	GF	GA	GD	Pts	Qualification
1	Bahrain	3	3	0	0	92	71	+21	6	Semifinals
2	Kuwait	3	2	0	1	74	80	−6	4	Semifinals
3	South Korea	3	1	0	2	75	78	−3	2	
4	Iran	3	0	0	3	66	78	−12	0	

Source: AHF

29 September; 12:00	Iran	22–24	Kuwait	ZJSU Sports Centre, Hangzhou; Referees: Ismoilov, Ismoilov (UZB)
29 September; 12:00	Taheri, Behnamnia 5	(10–10)	Al-Musawi 5	ZJSU Sports Centre, Hangzhou; Referees: Ismoilov, Ismoilov (UZB)
29 September; 12:00	2× (suspension)		3× (suspension)	ZJSU Sports Centre, Hangzhou; Referees: Ismoilov, Ismoilov (UZB)

29 September; 18:00	Bahrain	29–26	South Korea	ZJSU Sports Centre, Hangzhou; Referees: Shakir, Kadhim (IRQ)
29 September; 18:00	Al-Sayyad 11	(13–10)	Jang, Lee H. 6	ZJSU Sports Centre, Hangzhou; Referees: Shakir, Kadhim (IRQ)
29 September; 18:00	2× (yellow card) 6× (suspension)		1× (yellow card) 3× (suspension)	ZJSU Sports Centre, Hangzhou; Referees: Shakir, Kadhim (IRQ)

30 September; 14:00	Iran	20–29	Bahrain	ZJSU Sports Centre, Hangzhou; Referees: Furukawa, Murata (JPN)
30 September; 14:00	Sadeghi 5	(7–12)	Habib 7	ZJSU Sports Centre, Hangzhou; Referees: Furukawa, Murata (JPN)
30 September; 14:00	1× (yellow card) 5× (suspension)		2× (suspension)	ZJSU Sports Centre, Hangzhou; Referees: Furukawa, Murata (JPN)

30 September; 18:00	Kuwait	25–24	South Korea	ZJSU Sports Centre, Hangzhou; Referees: Cheng, Zhou (CHN)
30 September; 18:00	Al-Hendal 7	(9–13)	Jang 6	ZJSU Sports Centre, Hangzhou; Referees: Cheng, Zhou (CHN)
30 September; 18:00	1× (yellow card) 4× (suspension)		1× (yellow card) 5× (suspension) 1× (red card)	ZJSU Sports Centre, Hangzhou; Referees: Cheng, Zhou (CHN)

1 October; 14:00	South Korea	25–24	Iran	ZJSU Sports Centre, Hangzhou; Referees: Al-Wahibi, Al-Shahi (OMA)
1 October; 14:00	Lee H. 5	(11–12)	Kabirianjoo, Asari 5	ZJSU Sports Centre, Hangzhou; Referees: Al-Wahibi, Al-Shahi (OMA)
1 October; 14:00	6× (suspension)		1× (yellow card) 10× (suspension)	ZJSU Sports Centre, Hangzhou; Referees: Al-Wahibi, Al-Shahi (OMA)

1 October; 18:00	Kuwait	25–34	Bahrain	ZJSU Sports Centre, Hangzhou; Referees: Ismoilov, Ismoilov (UZB)
1 October; 18:00	Abdula. Al-Shammari, Al-Harbi 7	(11–21)	Naser 8	ZJSU Sports Centre, Hangzhou; Referees: Ismoilov, Ismoilov (UZB)
1 October; 18:00	2× (suspension)		1× (yellow card) 5× (suspension)	ZJSU Sports Centre, Hangzhou; Referees: Ismoilov, Ismoilov (UZB)

==== Group II ====
Pos	Team	Pld	W	D	L	GF	GA	GD	Pts	Qualification
1	Qatar	3	3	0	0	115	62	+53	6	Semifinals
2	Japan	3	2	0	1	105	75	+30	4	Semifinals
3	China	3	1	0	2	83	82	+1	2	
4	Kazakhstan	3	0	0	3	50	134	−84	0	

Source: AHF

29 September; 14:00	Japan	28–23	China	ZJSU Sports Centre, Hangzhou; Referees: Al-Mawt, Al-Marhoon (BHR)
29 September; 14:00	Motoki 8	(12–12)	Zhu 8	ZJSU Sports Centre, Hangzhou; Referees: Al-Mawt, Al-Marhoon (BHR)
29 September; 14:00	1× (yellow card) 4× (suspension)		3× (yellow card) 2× (suspension) 1× (red card)	ZJSU Sports Centre, Hangzhou; Referees: Al-Mawt, Al-Marhoon (BHR)

29 September; 16:00	Kazakhstan	13–46	Qatar	ZJSU Sports Centre, Hangzhou; Referees: Awwad, Al-Zayyat (JOR)
29 September; 16:00	Milyayev 4	(6–23)	Denguir 8	ZJSU Sports Centre, Hangzhou; Referees: Awwad, Al-Zayyat (JOR)
29 September; 16:00	1× (suspension)		1× (yellow card) 2× (suspension)	ZJSU Sports Centre, Hangzhou; Referees: Awwad, Al-Zayyat (JOR)

30 September; 12:00	Japan	48–20	Kazakhstan	ZJSU Sports Centre, Hangzhou; Referees: Al-Enezi, Al-Naseem (KUW)
30 September; 12:00	Kani 13	(26–12)	Milyayev, Kali 4	ZJSU Sports Centre, Hangzhou; Referees: Al-Enezi, Al-Naseem (KUW)
30 September; 12:00	1× (yellow card) 1× (suspension)		3× (suspension)	ZJSU Sports Centre, Hangzhou; Referees: Al-Enezi, Al-Naseem (KUW)

30 September; 16:00	China	20–37	Qatar	ZJSU Sports Centre, Hangzhou; Referees: Lee, Koo (KOR)
30 September; 16:00	Sun, Xie 4	(6–17)	Carol 9	ZJSU Sports Centre, Hangzhou; Referees: Lee, Koo (KOR)
30 September; 16:00	4× (suspension)		2× (suspension) 1× (red card)	ZJSU Sports Centre, Hangzhou; Referees: Lee, Koo (KOR)

1 October; 12:00	China	40–17	Kazakhstan	ZJSU Sports Centre, Hangzhou; Referees: Lee, Lee (KOR)
1 October; 12:00	Zhang T., Liu 6	(16–7)	Gaziyev 6	ZJSU Sports Centre, Hangzhou; Referees: Lee, Lee (KOR)
1 October; 12:00	3× (suspension)		4× (suspension)	ZJSU Sports Centre, Hangzhou; Referees: Lee, Lee (KOR)

1 October; 16:00	Qatar	32–29	Japan	ZJSU Sports Centre, Hangzhou; Referees: Cheng, Zhou (CHN)
1 October; 16:00	Carol 11	(16–15)	Motoki 6	ZJSU Sports Centre, Hangzhou; Referees: Cheng, Zhou (CHN)
1 October; 16:00	1× (yellow card) 3× (suspension)			ZJSU Sports Centre, Hangzhou; Referees: Cheng, Zhou (CHN)

=== Final round ===
Semifinals
3 October
Bahrain	30
Japan	28
3 October
Qatar	29
Kuwait	24

Gold medal match
5 October
Bahrain	25
Qatar	32
Bronze medal match
5 October
Japan	30
Kuwait	31

==== Semifinals ====
3 October; 16:00	Bahrain	30–28	Japan	ZJSU Sports Centre, Hangzhou; Referees: Ismoilov, Ismoilov (UZB)
3 October; 16:00	Al-Sayyad 9	(17–13)	Izumoto 6	ZJSU Sports Centre, Hangzhou; Referees: Ismoilov, Ismoilov (UZB)
3 October; 16:00	5× (suspension)		3× (suspension)	ZJSU Sports Centre, Hangzhou; Referees: Ismoilov, Ismoilov (UZB)

3 October; 18:00	Qatar	29–24	Kuwait	ZJSU Sports Centre, Hangzhou; Referees: Murata, Furukawa (JPN)
3 October; 18:00	Carol 7	(12–12)	Al-Musawi, Salmeen 4	ZJSU Sports Centre, Hangzhou; Referees: Murata, Furukawa (JPN)
3 October; 18:00	1× (yellow card) 3× (suspension)		1× (yellow card) 7× (suspension) 1× (red card)	ZJSU Sports Centre, Hangzhou; Referees: Murata, Furukawa (JPN)

==== Bronze medal match ====
5 October; 15:00	Japan	30–31	Kuwait	ZJSU Sports Centre, Hangzhou; Referees: Cheng, Zhou (CHN)
5 October; 15:00	Yoshino 9	(14–14)	Abdula. Al-Shammari 7	ZJSU Sports Centre, Hangzhou; Referees: Cheng, Zhou (CHN)
5 October; 15:00	1× (yellow card) 3× (suspension)		1× (yellow card) 4× (suspension)	ZJSU Sports Centre, Hangzhou; Referees: Cheng, Zhou (CHN)

==== Gold medal match ====
5 October; 19:00	Bahrain	25–32	Qatar	ZJSU Sports Centre, Hangzhou; Referees: Lee, Koo (KOR)
5 October; 19:00	Qambar 5	(14–12)	Capote 8	ZJSU Sports Centre, Hangzhou; Referees: Lee, Koo (KOR)
5 October; 19:00	1× (yellow card) 7× (suspension) 1× (red card)		2× (yellow card) 4× (suspension)	ZJSU Sports Centre, Hangzhou; Referees: Lee, Koo (KOR)

== Final standing ==
Rank	Team	Pld	W	D	L
1st place, gold medalist(s)	Qatar	7	7	0	0
2nd place, silver medalist(s)	Bahrain	7	6	0	1
3rd place, bronze medalist(s)	Kuwait	7	5	0	2
4	Japan	8	5	0	3
5	China	5	2	0	3
5	South Korea	5	2	0	3
7	Iran	6	1	1	4
7	Kazakhstan	5	1	0	4
9	Hong Kong	2	0	0	2
9	Saudi Arabia	3	1	1	1
9	Thailand	2	0	0	2
9	Uzbekistan	2	0	0	2
13	Mongolia	3	0	0	3
