= Kim Dong-myung =

Personal information
- Nationality: Korean
- Born: 5 August 1985 (age 41)
- Height: 1.95 m (6 ft 5 in)

Sport
- Sport: Handball
- Position: Pivot
- Current club: Doosan
National team
Years	Team	Apps
–	Korea	12

Kim Dong-myung (born 5 August 1985) is a Korean handball player for Doosan and the Korean national team.

He represented Korea at the 2019 World Men's Handball Championship.
