= Korea men's national handball team =

Korean handball team

Korea

Information
- Association: Korea Handball Federation and Handball Association of the Democratic People's Republic of Korea
- Coach: Cho Young-shin

Colours
1st	2nd

Results

World Championship
- Appearances: 1 (First in 2019)
- Best result: 22nd (2019)
- Last updated on Unknown.

The Korea national handball team was a representative side which was composed of players from both South Korea and North Korea.

The team competed at the 2019 World Championship as "Korea".

== 2019 World Championship ==
The team had to have four players from North Korea. Because of this rule the team was allowed to have 20 players in the team instead of 16. The team played with the country abbreviation COR.

== World Championship record ==
Games	Round	Position	Pld	W	D	L	GF	GA	GD
2019 Denmark / Germany	Match for 21st place	22nd of 24	7	1	0	6	177	216	-39
Total		22nd place	7	1	0	6	177	216	-39

== Current squad ==
Squad for the 2019 World Men's Handball Championship.

Head coach: Cho Young-shin

No.	Pos.	Name	Date of birth (age)	Height	App.	Goals	Club
1	GK	Park Jae-yong	20 March 1997 (age 29)	1.91 m	10		(South Korea) Korea National Sport University
2	CB	Ri Kyong-song	6 November 1997 (age 28)	1.78 m	7		(North Korea)
3	LB	Pak Jong-gon	25 March 2000 (age 26)	1.79 m	7		(North Korea)
5	CB	Choi Beom-mun	1 February 1996 (age 30)	1.80 m	13		(South Korea) Chungnam Sports Council
7	RB	Jung Su-young	17 October 1985 (age 40)	1.85 m	32		(South Korea) Hanam Handball Club
9	RB	Jo Tae-hun	30 June 1991 (age 35)	1.83 m	13		(South Korea) Doosan
10	LB	Park Young-jun	28 January 1994 (age 32)	1.88 m	12		(South Korea) Korea Armed Forces Athletic Corps
11	LW	Jang Dong-hyun	13 January 1995 (age 31)	1.80 m	18		(South Korea) SK Hawks
13	RW	Park Dong-kwang	14 April 1996 (age 30)	1.82 m	15		(South Korea) Hanam Sports Council
14	LB	Ri Song-jin	11 August 1989 (age 37)	1.78 m	7		(North Korea)
15	P	Kim Dong-myung	5 August 1985 (age 41)	1.95 m	12		(South Korea) Doosan
17	RW	Na Seung-do	27 January 1990 (age 36)	1.95 m	20		(South Korea) Doosan
20	CB	Kang Tan	22 September 1999 (age 26)	1.86 m	9		(South Korea) Korea National Sport University
22	LW	Seo Seung-hyun	24 March 1991 (age 35)	1.78 m	9		(South Korea) Hanam Handball Club
23	LB	Park Kwang-soon	6 May 1996 (age 30)	1.87 m	13		(South Korea) Hanam Sports Council
24	RB	Ri Yong-myong	27 July 1998 (age 28)	1.85 m	7		(North Korea)
34	CB	Kang Jeong-gu	11 May 1990 (age 36)	1.79 m	13		(South Korea) Doosan
52	P	Jeong Jae-wan	1 September 1996 (age 30)	1.88 m	13		(South Korea) Hanam Sports Council
88	P	Ku Change-un	30 June 1991 (age 35)	1.90 m	17		(South Korea) Doosan
94	GK	Ji Hyung-jin	25 May 1994 (age 32)	1.82 m	11		(South Korea) Kyung Hee University
