= Jeong Jae-wan =

Korean handball player (born 1996)

Personal information
- Nationality: Korean
- Born: 1 September 1996 (age 30)
- Height: 1.88 m (6 ft 2 in)

Sport
- Sport: Handball
- Position: Pivot
- Current club: Hanam Sports Council
National team
Years	Team	Apps
–	Korea	13

Jeong Jae-wan (born 1 September 1996) is a South Korean handball player for Hanam Sports Council and the Korean national team.

Jeong represented Korea at the 2019 World Men's Handball Championship.

== Personal life ==
At the age of 24, Jeong joined the Korean Army in May. He ruptured his left Achilles tendon and ligament while exercising with his colleagues three weeks after joining the army. He was taken to an outside hospital for surgery immediately.

The hospital explained that he needed hospitalization for two months, but Jeong returned to his unit in three weeks. This is because the military authorities ordered him to return due to vacation regulations. It was said that if Jeong was treated using his vacation, there would be no vacation left that he could use for the rest of his service.

Jeong returned to the training center but did not receive proper medical assistance. Patients who underwent surgery were reportedly quarantined without receiving essential disinfectants and antibiotics. This is because Korea Army Training Center confirmed the case of COVID-19 infection. Jeong asked the training center to allow outside treatment, but it was not accepted.

Jeong, who was left neglected for about 10 days at the training center, recently went to an outside hospital after being deployed to Korea Armed Forces Athletic Corps. The surgical site had developed to a serious level of skin necrosis. The medical team diagnosis was that further playing could be difficult.

The Korea Army Training Center claimed that they did not force Jeong to return to the training center, but only explained the rules of vacation. In addition, he was given saline water twice at his request. However, it was not clear whether the training center lacked disinfectants.
