= Na Seung-do =

South Korean handball player (born 1990)

Personal information
- Nationality: Korean
- Born: 27 January 1990 (age 36)
- Height: 1.95 m (6 ft 5 in)

Sport
- Sport: Handball
- Position: Right wing
- Current club: Doosan
National team
Years	Team	Apps
–	Korea	20

Na Seung-do (born 27 January 1990) is a Korean handball player for Doosan and the Korean national team.

He represented Korea at the 2019 World Men's Handball Championship.
