= Park Jae-yong =

Park Jae-yong may refer to:

- Park Jae-yong (footballer, born 2000)
- Park Jae-yong (handballer)
