= Park Dong-kwang =

South Korean handball player

Personal information
- Nationality: Korean
- Born: 14 April 1996 (age 30)
- Height: 1.82 m (6 ft 0 in)

Sport
- Sport: Handball
- Position: Right wing
- Current club: Hanam Sports Council
National team
Years	Team	Apps
–	Korea	15

Park Dong-kwang (born 14 April 1996) is a Korean handball player for Hanam Sports Council and the Korean national team.

He represented Korea at the 2019 World Men's Handball Championship.
