= Mohamed Habib =

Bahraini handball player

Mohamed Hassan Habib Ahmed
Personal information
- Full name: Mohamed Hassan Habib Ahmed
- Nationality: Bahraini
- Born: 20 July 1993 (age 33)
- Height: 1.86 m (6 ft 1 in)

Sport
- Sport: Handball
- Position: Left back
- Current club: Al-Najma
- Number: 93
National team
| Years | Team | Apps | (Gls) |
| – | Bahrain | 92 | (384) |
Medal record
Men's handball
Representing Bahrain
Asian Games
| Gold medal – first place | 2026 Aichi–Nagoya | Team |
| Silver medal – second place | 2018 Jakarta | Team |
| Silver medal – second place | 2022 Hangzhou | Team |
Asian Championship
| Silver medal – second place | 2018 South Korea |
| Silver medal – second place | 2022 Saudi Arabia |
| Bronze medal – third place | 2024 Bahrain |

Mohamed Hassan Habib Ahmed (Arabic: محمد حسن حبيب أحمد, born 20 July 1993), is a Bahraini handball player for Al-Najma and the Bahraini national team.

He participated at the 2017 World Men's Handball Championship and at the delayed 2020 Summer Olympics.
