= H League =

South Korean handball league

- Founded: 2011
- Country: South Korea
- Confederation: KHF
- Most recent champions: Men: Incheon City Corporation (2025–26); Women: SK Sugar Gliders (2025–26)
- Most titles: Men: Doosan (13 titles); Women: SK Sugar Gliders (5 titles)
- Website: Official website

The H League (Korean: H리그) is a handball league in South Korea. Before 2023, the competition was named Handball Korea League.

The league finals are hosted at the SK Olympic Handball Gymnasium within the Olympic Park in Seoul. In 2011, the former Olympic Fencing Gymnasium was remodelled for handball games at a cost of ₩43.4 billion, specialized with handball only courts.

The league has a semi-professional status, with plans to become fully professional in the future.

== 2025–26 teams ==
=== Men's ===
- Chungnam Provincial Office
- Doosan Handball Club
- Hanam Handball Club
- Incheon Metropolitan City Corporation
- Sangmu Phoenix (Korea Armed Forces Athletic Corps Handball Team)
- SK Hawks

=== Women's ===
- Busan Infrastructure Corporation
- Daegu Metropolitan City Hall
- Gwangju City Corporation
- Gyeongnam Development Corporation
- Incheon Metropolitan City Hall
- Samcheok City Hall
- Seoul City Hall
- SK Sugar Gliders

== Champions ==
=== Men's ===
==== Titles by season ====
Season	Winners	Runners-up
2011	Doosan	Chungnam Sports Council
2012	Doosan	Chungnam Sports Council
2013	Doosan	Chungnam Sports Council
2014	Korosa	Doosan
2015	Doosan	Sangmu Phoenix
2016	Doosan	SK Hawks
2017	Doosan	Incheon City Corporation
2018–19	Doosan	SK Hawks
2019–20	Doosan	SK Hawks
2020–21	Doosan	Incheon City Corporation
2021–22	Doosan	SK Hawks
2022–23	Doosan	Incheon City Corporation
2023–24	Doosan	SK Hawks
2024–25	Doosan	SK Hawks
2025–26	Incheon City Corporation	SK Hawks

==== Titles by club ====
Club	Winners	Runners-up
Doosan	13	1
Incheon City Corporation	1	3
Korosa	1	0
SK Hawks	0	7
Chungnam Sports Council	0	3
Sangmu Phoenix	0	1

=== Women's ===
==== Titles by season ====
Season	Winners	Runners-up
2011	Incheon Sports Council	Samcheok City Hall
2012	Incheon Sports Council	Wonderful Samcheok
2013	Wonderful Samcheok	Incheon Sports Council
2014	Incheon City Hall	Seoul City
2015	Incheon City Hall	Seoul City
2016	Seoul City	Samcheok City Hall
2017	SK Sugar Gliders	Seoul City
2018–19	Busan Infrastructure Corporation	SK Sugar Gliders
2019–20	SK Sugar Gliders	Busan Infrastructure Corporation
2020–21	Busan Infrastructure Corporation	Samcheok City Hall
2021–22	Samcheok City Hall	Gwangju Metropolitan City Corporation
2022–23	Samcheok City Hall	Busan Infrastructure Corporation
2023–24	SK Sugar Gliders	Samcheok City Hall
2024–25	SK Sugar Gliders	Samcheok City Hall
2025–26	SK Sugar Gliders	Samcheok City Hall

==== Titles by club ====
Club	Winners	Runners-up
SK Sugar Gliders	5	1
Incheon City Hall (Note: Known as Incheon Sports Council from 2011 to 2013.)	4	1
Samcheok City Hall (Note: Known as Wonderful Samcheok from 2012 to 2016.)	3	7
Busan Infrastructure Corporation	2	2
Seoul City	1	3
Gwangju Metropolitan City Corporation	0	1
