= Ri Song-jin =

Korean handball player

Personal information
- Nationality: Korean
- Born: 11 August 1989 (age 37)
- Height: 1.78 m (5 ft 10 in)

Sport
- Sport: Handball
- Position: Left back
National team
Years	Team	Apps
2019–	Korea	7

Ri Song-jin (born 11 August 1989) is a Korean handball player for the Korean national team.

He represented Korea at the 2019 World Men's Handball Championship.
