= Choi Beom-mun =

South Korean handball player (born 1996)

Personal information
- Nationality: Korean
- Born: 1 February 1996 (age 30)
- Height: 1.80 m (5 ft 11 in)

Sport
- Sport: Handball
- Position: Centre back
- Current club: Chungnam Sports Council
National team
Years	Team	Apps
–	Korea	13
Medal record
Asian Championship
Silver medal – second place	2020 Kuwait

Choi Beom-mun (born 1 February 1996) is a Korean handball player for Chungnam Sports Council and the Korean national team.

He represented Korea at the 2019 World Men's Handball Championship.
