= Ri Yong-myong =

Korean handball player

Personal information
- Nationality: Korean
- Born: 27 July 1998 (age 28)
- Height: 1.85 m (6 ft 1 in)

Sport
- Sport: Handball
- Position: Right back
National team
Years	Team	Apps
2019–	Korea	7

Ri Yong-myong (born 27 July 1998) is a Korean handball player for the Korean national team.

He represented Korea at the 2019 World Men's Handball Championship.
