= Seo Seung-hyun =

South Korean handball player

Personal information
- Nationality: Korean
- Born: 24 March 1991 (age 35)
- Height: 1.89 m (6 ft 2 in)

Sport
- Sport: Handball
- Position: Left wing
- Current club: Hanam Handball Club
National team
Years	Team	Apps
–	Korea	9

Seo Seung-hyun (born 24 March 1991) is a Korean handball player for Hanam Handball Club and the Korean national team.

He represented Korea at the 2019 World Men's Handball Championship.
