= HC Korosa =

- Full name: Handball Club Korosa
- Founded: 2001; 25 years ago
- Dissolved: 2016; 10 years ago
Home	Away

HC Korosa was a handball club based in Gyeongsangnam-do, South Korea.

== Honours ==
- Handball Korea League

Winners (1): 2014

- South Korean Handball Festivals

Winners (3): 2004–05, 2005–06, 2008
Runners-up (2): 2001, 2002–03
