= Pak Jong-gon =

Korean handball player

Personal information
- Nationality: Korean
- Born: 25 March 2000 (age 26)
- Height: 1.79 m (5 ft 10 in)

Sport
- Sport: Handball
- Position: Left back
National team
Years	Team	Apps
2019–	Korea	7

Pak Jong-gon (born 25 March 2000) is a Korean handball player for the Korean national team.

He represented Korea at the 2019 World Men's Handball Championship.
