= Ji Hyung-jin =

South Korean handball player (born 1994)

Personal information
- Nationality: Korean
- Born: 24 May 1994 (age 32)
- Height: 1.82 m (6 ft 0 in)

Sport
- Sport: Handball
- Position: Goalkeeper
- Current club: SK Hawks
National team
Years	Team	Apps
–	Korea	11

Ji Hyung-jin (born 25 May 1994) is a Korean handball player for the SK Hawks and the South Korea men's national handball team and was a player for the Kyung Hee University and the Korean national team.

He represented Korea at the 2019 World Men's Handball Championship.
