= Ri Kyong-song =

Korean handball player

Personal information
- Nationality: Korean
- Born: 6 November 1997 (age 28)
- Height: 1.78 m (5 ft 10 in)

Sport
- Sport: Handball
- Position: Centre back
National team
| Years | Team | Apps |
| 2019– | Korea | 7 |

Ri Kyong-song (born 6 November 1997) is a Korean handball player for the Korean national team.

He represented Korea at the 2019 World Men's Handball Championship.
