= Jo Tae-hun =

South Korean handball player (born 1991)

Personal information
- Nationality: Korean
- Born: 30 June 1991 (age 35)
- Height: 1.83 m (6 ft 0 in)

Sport
- Sport: Handball
- Position: Right back
- Current club: Doosan
National team
Years	Team	Apps
–	Korea	13

Jo Tae-hun (born 30 June 1991) is a Korean handball player for Doosan and the Korean national team.

He represented Korea at the 2019 World Men's Handball Championship.
