= Korea Army Training Center =

Military training center in South Korea

- Nonsan, South Chungcheong Province
- KATC insignia

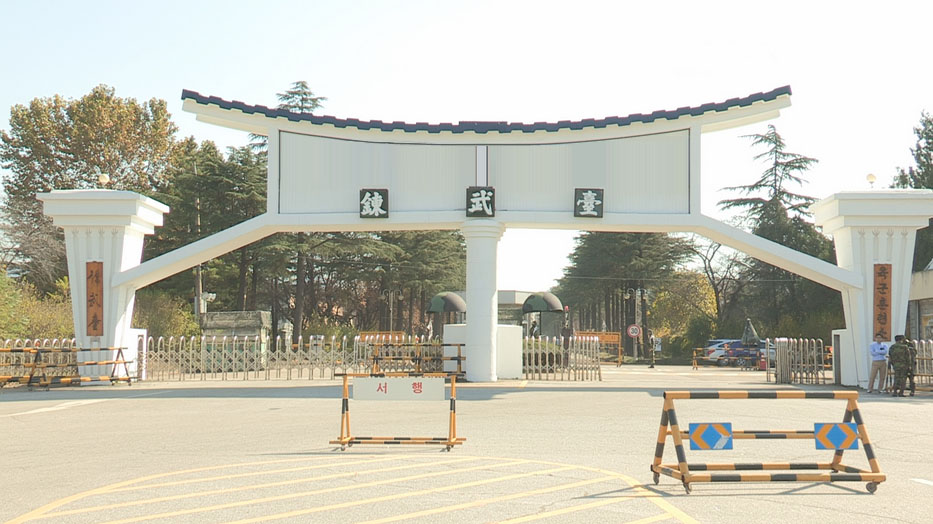
- KATC main gate

Site information
- Type: Training Center
- Owner: Republic of Korea Army
- Controlled by: ROK Army Training & Doctrine Command
- Condition: In use

Site history
- Built: 1951
- In use: 1951–present.

Garrison information
- Current commander: Major General Ryu Seung Min

The Korea Army Training Center (abbreviated KATC; Korean: 육군훈련소) is a South Korean military training institution for the Republic of Korea Army basic training. It is also commonly known as Nonsan Training Center or Yeonmudae.

It is one of the subordinate elements of the Republic of Korea Army Training & Doctrine Command (육군교육사령부). It was established in 1951 during the Korean War, by order of South Korean President Syngman Rhee. The recruits get deployed to their designated units after receiving basic military training at the KATC.

== Conscription in Korea ==
Article 39(1) of the Republic of Korea's Constitution states that all people have the duty of national defense under the conditions specified in the Constitution. The Military Duty Law, mandated by the Constitution, states that all male Korean nationals must fully fulfill their military service duties, as stated by the Constitution and Article 3(1) of this Law.

As a result, under the universal conscription system, all South Korean male citizens between the ages of 18 and 35 are compelled to serve in the military. Recruited troops often undertake short-term basic military training to become elite soldiers, with the majority of manual activity. The service is for a defined period of time, after which soldiers are moved to reserve units. After finishing their military duty, the reserves just get on with their lives in peacetime until they are called up again in an emergency or wartime. New recruits train for five weeks on active duty and three weeks on supplementary duty before becoming private soldiers

== History ==
During the Korean War, there were training centers from the 1st to the 7th, and it took about two weeks to put it on the frontline. The 1st Training Center was at Moseulpo, Jeju Island, Seoguipo, (Note: The training period for recruits in the 1st Korea Training Center was 16 weeks. According to the U.S. military's curriculum, abling them to complete all basic training for riflemen. After infantry departments, they went to the front after receiving additional training at each military academy branch. When the war was urgent, they trained new troops and sent them to the front line, but if not, they were required to complete all the courses faithfully.) and the 3rd training center was located in Geoje, South Gyeongsang Province. KATC was established on November 1, 1951 under the name "2nd Training Center" to fix problems of the 1st training center unfit for training recruits from the mainland korean peninsula, and to encourage affiliations with other military training instituitions outside jeju. In commemoration of its establishment, President Syngman Rhee gave it the pen name "Yeonmudae(연무대; 鍊武臺, roughly translated as "The stage of training martial arts")"

== Process of the training ==
=== Assimilation education ===
A three-day preparatory session in which novices acclimate to the training center before beginning fullfledged training. They spend time listening to instructions regarding procedure routines, official names, living regulations at the training center, and completing out surveys, among other things.

- Enlistment ceremony : This is the first military event in which a civilian enters the military world to become a soldier, leaving family behind.
- Supplying Personal items: Soldiers' individual body dimensions are scanned with a 3D automatic body dimensional scanner in order for them to receive appropriate equipment. Personal equipment is given, including combat suits, combat boots, underwear, sportswear, and military essentials like as toothpaste, toothbrushes, and tissues.
- Physical Examination: In addition to basic tests such as weight and height, a thorough analysis of individual diseases and body constitution is conducted.
- Special aptitude examination: Individual specialties are reviewed to determine whether it is possible to perform duties as a special forces soldier in the future.

=== Weeks 1-2: Establishing a basic military posture ===
- Firearms acquisition: Soldiers are issued their weapons.
- Entrance ceremony: A soldier makes a pledge as a trainee to undergo five weeks of training and become a private honorable soldier.
- Mental power education: Soldiers will be instructed to develop basic military posture. During this time, troops learn about military spirit through education on national, security, and enemy perspectives. They are taught what kind of country the Republic of Korea is, why it is necessary to join the military, and what kind of country the biggest opponent, North Korea, is.
- Formal discipline: Over the course of two weeks, trainees will acquire basic military posture, mental power, military spirit, national point of view, security, and so on. They will learn everything there is to know about a soldier's basic mental attitude, including how to walk, salute, and execute military etiquette.

=== Weeks 3-5: Basic combat skills preparation ===
- Operation and management of rifles: Trainees are shown how to use and handle guns, as well as personal firearm characteristics, mission operation mastery, and management skills. Usually, Active duty trainees are subject to the training with Daewoo K2 rifle.
- Preliminary rifle instruction: During shooting training, soldiers learn how to dismantle a gun in case it malfunctions, along with how to shoot, aim, and focus between gunshots. Following this training is range shooting practice.
- Guard training: It is the responsibility of judging whether a suspicious person is trying to enter the unit or making suspicious moves at a guard checkpoint. It is a critical task because it is the first defense line against the opponent. A typical exercise is walking along the wire fences or looking around at a high guard post. Soldiers are trained how to look around and behave when someone approaches them.
- First-aid training: Training to learn basic first aid skills in order to help injured soldiers in war. If a comrade sustains an injury to his leg or arm, he learns how to splint or bandage it, how to stop bleeding with a wooden stick, how to support, how to carry a piggyback, how to create a stretcher, and how to perform CPR. This education is valuable since it can be utilized in the actual world.
- CBR training: Chemical, biological, and radiological training teaches how to utilize gas masks to avoid gas absorption in the eventuality of an enemy chemical bomb attack. Soldiers are required to remove their masks and face the gas bare-faced. This emphasizes the dangers of chemical attacks and the importance of wearing gas masks. Either K1 or K5 gas masks are used in the training.
- Grenade training: Soldiers become accustomed with hand grenades and their composition, structure, and specifications during this time, learn the instructions, and eventually gain the ability to effectively overpower the opponent in battle. Each step of training is accomplished by completing a certain task, advancing, and finally capturing the enemy's position. It is one of the training exercises that requires a lot of strength, and eventually troops will be able to effectively overpower the adversary in battle.
- Zero shooting: Shooting exercises to improve accuracy when hitting the target, and impact points at a constant range
- Record shooting: Even more practice to understand and master the principles of hitting targets by range.
- Individual combat: A training to thoroughly master accuracy of direction, changing terrains, while facing various situations. Novices will show what they have learned in a wide range of situations and overcome obstacles with various strategies for moving at night. Soldiers with these abilities will be able to catch the enemy's position and respond appropriately to the circumstances.
- Full march of troops: Soldiers march 20 kilometers around the training camps at night while carrying a 20 kg full-armament backpack containing blankets, combat shoes, and shovels to confront unexpected situations that may occur on the battlefield. This type of activity promotes combat spirit and pushes troops to their utmost combat strength.
- Completion ceremony: Soldiers receive a badge at the end of the five weeks of training as a token of their successful completion of the training. Families are allowed to visit their sons after the completion ceremony.
- Transfer: Soldiers are allocated to a new unit following the completion ceremony.

== Introduction to supplementary service three-week training ==
In training course for supplementary service personnel, the overall course and difficulty are shortened and eased comparing with active duty training course, mainly due to the trainees' health and medical issues. Supplementary service personnel are subject to the draft during wartime when almost all active duty Human Resources are exhausted in the war. Also, unlike active duty, they are classified as soldiers only for three weeks; this means after the day when completion ceremony holds, they are reverted to civilian.

=== Assimilation education ===
A three-day preparatory session in which novices acclimate to the training center before beginning fullfledged training. They spend time listening to instructions regarding procedure routines, official names, living regulations at the training center, and completing out surveys, among other things.

- Enlistment ceremony: This is the first military event in which a civilian enters the military world to become a wartime combatant, leaving family behind for three weeks before comeback.
- Supplying Personal items: Personal equipment is given, including combat suits, combat boots, underwear, sportswear, and military essentials like as toothpaste, toothbrushes, and tissues.

=== Week 1: Establishing a basic military posture ===
- Firearms acquisition: Soldiers are issued their weapons.
- Entrance ceremony: A soldier makes a pledge as a trainee to undergo three weeks of training and become a wartime combatant.
- Mental power education: Same as active duty training courses.
- Formal discipline: Shortened course contrary to active duty training courses.

=== Weeks 2-3: Basic combat skills preparation ===
- Operation and management of rifles: Same as active duty training course.
- Preliminary rifle instructions: Almost the same as active duty training course, but shortened.
- Guard training: Same as active duty training course. It is a part of Individual combat training course.
- First-aid training: Same as active duty training course.
- CBR training: Same as active duty training course, but the hurdle to qualify the completion of this subject is usually eased comparing with active duty course.
- Grenade training: Unlike active duty course, supplementary service trainees are only subject to throw practice grenades.
- Zero shooting: Shooting exercises to improve accuracy when hitting the target, and impact points at a constant range
- Record shooting: Excluded. Supplementary service trainees are not subject to record shooting course.
- Individual combat: Substantially shortened comparing with active duty training course.
- March of troops: Soldiers march 20 kilometers around the training camps at daytime. Unlike active duty training courses, supplementary service trainees can have an option to reduced backpack based on their health and medical conditions. This type of activity promotes combat spirit and pushes troops to their utmost combat strength.
- Completion ceremony: Soldiers are completed the training course over three weeks. Unlike active duty training courses, after the ceremony, soldiers return to the society with their families and acquaintances until the beginning of their respective duties as social service personnel.
- Return: Soldiers are returned to the society. Workplaces for the remaining period as social service personnel are assigned. For alternative service personnel such as Industrial Technical, Technical Research, or Art and Sports Personnel, or Public Health Doctor etc., they're back to their workplace to resume the work and duty. After the day of completion ceremony, they are reverted as civilian once again.
