= Mahdi Saad =

Bahraini handball player

Personal information
- Full name: Mahdi Habib Abdulla Saad
- Nationality: Bahraini
- Born: 15 March 1989 (age 37)
- Height: 1.73 m (5 ft 8 in)

Sport
- Sport: Handball
- Position: Left wing
- Current club: Al-Najma
- Number: 89
National team
Years	Team	Apps	(Gls)
–	Bahrain	77	(216)
Medal record
Asian Championship
Silver medal – second place	2018 South Korea
Silver medal – second place	2022 Saudi Arabia
Bronze medal – third place	2024 Bahrain	Team

Mahdi Habib Abdulla Saad (Arabic: مهدي حبيب عبد الله سعد, romanized: Mahdi Habib Abdullah Saad, born 15 March 1989), known as Mahdi Saad or Mahdi Habib, is a Bahraini handball player for Al-Najma and the Bahraini national team.

He participated at the 2017 World Men's Handball Championship and at the delayed 2020 Summer Olympics.
