= Ku Chang-eun =

South Korean handball player (born 1993)

Personal information
- Nationality: Korean
- Born: 23 December 1993 (age 32)
- Height: 1.90 m (6 ft 3 in)

Sport
- Sport: Handball
- Position: Pivot
- Current club: Doosan
National team
Years	Team	Apps
–	Korea	17

Korean name
- Hangul: 구창은
- RR: Gu Changeun
- MR: Ku Ch'angŭn

Ku Chang-eun (born 23 December 1993) is a Korean handball player for Doosan and the Korean national team.

He represented Korea at the 2019 World Men's Handball Championship.
