= Incheon Metropolitan City Corporation HC =

Handball club in Incheon, South Korea

Incheon City Corporation
- Full name: Incheon Housing and City Development Corporation
- Founded: 2006; 20 years ago
- Head coach: Jang In-ik
- League: H League
- 2025–26: Regular season: 1st Playoffs: Champions

Incheon Housing and City Development Corporation Handball Club is a handball club based in Incheon, South Korea. They compete in the H League.

In 2025–26, they won the H League for the first time.

== Honours ==
- H League

Winners (1): 2025–26
Runners-up (3): 2017, 2020–21, 2022–23

- South Korean Handball Festivals

Runners-up (3): 2008, 2009, 2010

- Korea-Japan Handball Club Super Match

Winners (1): 2026
