= Kang Jeon-gu =

South Korean handball player (born 1990)

Personal information
- Nationality: Korean
- Born: 11 May 1990 (age 36)
- Height: 1.79 m (5 ft 10 in)

Sport
- Sport: Handball
- Position: Centre back
- Current club: Doosan
National team
Years	Team	Apps
–	Korea	13

Kang Jeon-gu (born 11 May 1990) is a Korean handball player for Doosan and the Korean national team.

He represented Korea at the 2019 World Men's Handball Championship.
