= Jang Dong-hyun =

Korean handball player (born 1995)

Personal information
- Nationality: Korean
- Born: 13 January 1995 (age 31)
- Height: 1.80 m (5 ft 11 in)

Sport
- Sport: Handball
- Position: Left wing
- Current club: SK Hawks
National team
Years	Team	Apps
–	Korea	18

Jang Dong-hyun (born 13 January 1995) is a Korean handball player for SK Hawks and the Korean national team.

He represented Korea at the 2018 Asian Games, the 2019 World Men's Handball Championship and the 2023 World Men's Handball Championship.
