= Mojtaba Heidarpour =

Iranian handball player (born 1988)

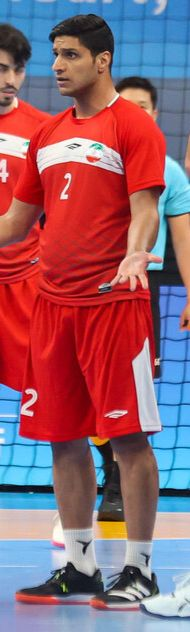

Personal information
- Nationality: Iranian
- Born: 20 September 1988 (age 38)
- Height: 1.80 m (5 ft 11 in)

Sport
- Sport: Handball
- Position: Left wing
- Current club: Samen Sabzevar
National team
Years	Team	Apps	(Gls)
–	Iran	21	(75)
Medal record
Men's handball
Representing Iran
Islamic Solidarity Games
Bronze medal – third place	2021 Konya

Mojtaba Heidarpour (Persian: مجتبی حیدرپور, born 20 September 1988) is an Iranian handball player for Samen Sabzevar and the Iranian national team.
