= Park Jae-yong (handballer) =

South Korean handball player

Personal information
- Nationality: Korean
- Born: 20 March 1997 (age 29)
- Height: 1.91 m (6 ft 3 in)

Sport
- Sport: Handball
- Position: Goalkeeper
- Current club: Korea National Sport University
National team
Years	Team	Apps
–	Korea	10

Park Jae-yong (born 20 March 1997) is a Korean handball player for Korea National Sport University and the Korean national team.

He represented Korea at the 2019 World Men's Handball Championship.
