= Park Young-jun (handballer) =

South Korean handball player

Personal information
- Nationality: Korean
- Born: 28 January 1994 (age 32)
- Height: 1.88 m (6 ft 2 in)

Sport
- Sport: Handball
- Position: Left back
- Current club: Korea Armed Forces Athletic Corps
National team
Years	Team	Apps
–	Korea	12
Medal record
Asian Championship
Silver medal – second place	2020 Kuwait

Park Young-jun (born 28 January 1994) is a Korean handball player for Korea Armed Forces Athletic Corps and the Korean national team.

He represented Korea at the 2019 World Men's Handball Championship.
