= Doosan Handball Club =

Doosan
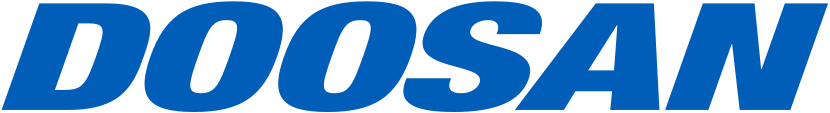
- Full name: Doosan Handball Club
- Founded: 1991; 35 years ago
- Head coach: Yoon Kyung-shin
- League: H League
- 2025–26: Regular season: 4th Playoffs: Did not qualify

Doosan Handball Club is a handball club based in South Gyeongsang Province, South Korea. Founded in 1991, they compete in the H League and are the most successful club in the league, having won the competition a record 13 times.

== Honours ==
- H League

Winners (13): 2011, 2012, 2013, 2015, 2016, 2017, 2018–19, 2019–20, 2020–21, 2021–22, 2022–23, 2023–24, 2024–25
Runners-up: 2014

- South Korean Handball Festivals

Winners (7): 1993, 1994, 1995, 2002–03, 2003–04, 2009, 2010
Runners-up (5): 1996, 1997, 2000, 2005–06, 2007
