= Handball at the 2008 Summer Olympics – Men's team rosters =

2008 Men's Olympic handball tournament
Tournament details
- Host country: China
- Venue(s): 2 (in 1 host city)
- Dates: 9–24 August
- Teams: 12 (from 5 confederations)

Final positions
- Champions: France
- Runners-up: Iceland
- Third place: Spain
- Fourth place: Croatia

This is a list of the players on the rosters of the teams participating in the 2008 Beijing Olympics in Men's Handball.

== Group A ==
=== Brazil ===
The following is the Brazil roster in the men's handball tournament of the 2008 Summer Olympics.

Head coach: (Spain) Jordi Ribera

No.	Pos.	Name	Date of birth (age)	Height	App.	Goals	Club
1	GK	Maik Santos	6 September 1980 (aged 27)	1.80 m	60	1	(Brazil) EC Pinheiros
3	RB	Fernando Pacheco Filho	25 May 1983 (aged 25)	1.90 m	54	90	(Brazil) EC Pinheiros
5	P	Carlos Ertel	18 December 1974 (aged 33)	1.85 m	139	316	(Brazil) IMES São Caetano
7	RW	Renato Ruy	7 June 1979 (aged 29)	1.84 m	121	211	(Germany) Wilhelmshavener HV
8	LB	Bruno Souza	27 June 1977 (aged 31)	1.99 m	139	316	(Germany) HSV Handball
9	CB	Leonardo Bortolini	10 April 1977 (aged 31)	1.85 m	124	350	(Brazil) Unopar Londrina
10	LW	Helio Justino	23 July 1972 (aged 36)	1.84 m	186	640	(Brazil) IMES São Caetano
12	GK	Alexandre Vasconcelos	19 December 1978 (aged 29)	1.94 m	130	0	(Brazil) Metodista SBC
13	RW	Silvio Laureano	19 April 1981 (aged 27)	1.70 m	30	32	(Brazil) IMES São Caetano
14	P	Alexandre Silva	12 November 1980 (aged 27)	1.90 m			(Brazil) Unopar Londrina
17	LW	Felipe Ribeiro	4 May 1985 (aged 23)	1.86 m	40	21	(Spain) BM Aragón
18	CB	Bruno Santana	27 February 1982 (aged 26)	1.83 m	89	112	(Brazil) EC Pinheiros
19	P	Jardel Pizzinato	10 February 1978 (aged 30)	1.92 m	73	11	(Brazil) Metodista SBC
20	LB	Gui Oliveira	8 January 1985 (aged 23)	1.90 m	40	57	(Austria) HSG Bärnbach/Köflach

=== China ===
The following is the China roster in the men's handball tournament of the 2008 Summer Olympics.

Head coach: (South Korea) Yam Weiming

No.	Pos.	Name	Date of birth (age)	Height	App.	Goals	Club
2	P	Cui Liang	20 February 1983 (aged 25)	1.95 m	80	354	(China) Beijing Army
3	CB	Zhu Jie	30 January 1978 (aged 30)	1.87 m	70	278	(China) Guangdong Handball Team
5	P	Yan Liang	23 January 1985 (aged 23)	2.01 m	40	105	(China) Jiangsu Suzhou
6	RB	Cui Lei	15 October 1980 (aged 27)	1.97 m	50	186	(China) Beijing Army
7	CB	Zhang Ji	5 November 1978 (aged 29)	1.86 m	30	120	(China) Beijing Handball Team
8	P	Zhou Xiaojian	13 January 1985 (aged 23)	1.98 m	40	113	(China) Jiangsu Suzhou
10	RW	Li Hexin	16 September 1985 (aged 22)	1.94 m	20	10	(China) Shanghai Handball Team
11	LW	Zhang Xing	13 June 1986 (aged 22)	1.93 m	30	97	(China) Jiangsu Suzhou
12	GK	Wang Long	27 November 1985 (aged 22)	1.95 m	25		(China) Beijing Handball Team
13	RW	Wang Xiaolong	17 August 1989 (aged 18)	1.87 m	30	116	(China) Anhui Hefei
14	LB	Tian Jianxia	3 September 1986 (aged 21)	1.90 m	40	132	(China) Tianjing Handball Team
16	GK	Ye Qiang	16 June 1978 (aged 30)	1.93 m	75		(China) Jiangsu Suzhou
18	LB	Hao Kexin	25 January 1986 (aged 22)	1.98 m	50	233	(China) Jiangsu Suzhou
19	RB	Miao Qing	4 February 1983 (aged 25)	2.00 m	50	225	(China) Beijing Army
20	LW	Zhu Wenxin	11 February 1980 (aged 28)	1.76 m	50	365	(China) Beijing Army

=== Croatia ===
The following is the Croatia roster in the men's handball tournament of the 2008 Summer Olympics.

Head coach: Lino Cervar

No.	Pos.	Name	Date of birth (age)	Height	App.	Goals	Club
1	GK	Venio Losert	25 July 1976 (aged 32)	1.91 m	149	0	(Spain) FC Barcelona Handbol
3	P	Renato Sulić	12 October 1979 (aged 28)	1.97 m	95	233	(Slovenia) RK Celje
4	CB	Ivano Balić	1 April 1979 (aged 29)	1.90 m	132	420	(Spain) SDC San Antonio
5	CB	Domagoj Duvnjak	1 June 1988 (aged 20)	1.97 m	19	34	(Croatia) RK Zagreb
6	LB	Blaženko Lacković	25 December 1980 (aged 27)	1.95 m	111	340	(Germany) SG Flensburg-Handewitt
9	P	Igor Vori	20 September 1980 (aged 27)	2.02 m	103	257	(Croatia) RK Zagreb
10	CB	Davor Dominiković	7 April 1978 (aged 30)	2.03 m	147	177	(Spain) SDC San Antonio
11	RW	Mirza Džomba	28 February 1977 (aged 31)	1.90 m	173	667	(Croatia) RK Zagreb
13	RW	Zlatko Horvat	25 September 1984 (aged 23)	1.79 m	35	65	(Croatia) RK Zagreb
14	CB	Drago Vuković	3 August 1983 (aged 25)	1.94 m	53	50	(Slovenia) RK Gorenje
17	LW	Goran Šprem	6 July 1979 (aged 29)	1.83 m	96	241	(Germany) HSG Nordhorn
19	RB	Petar Metličić	25 December 1976 (aged 31)	1.94 m	152	338	(Spain) BM Ciudad Real
23	LW	Ljubo Vukić	3 August 1982 (aged 26)	1.91 m	29	38	(Croatia) RK Zagreb
24	LB	Tonči Valčić	9 June 1978 (aged 30)	1.94 m	92	141	(Spain) CB Ademar León
25	GK	Mirko Alilović	15 September 1985 (aged 22)	2.00 m	25	0	(Spain) CB Ademar León

=== France ===
The following is the France roster in the men's handball tournament of the 2008 Summer Olympics.

Head coach: Claude Onesta

No.	Pos.	Name	Date of birth (age)	Height	App.	Goals	Club
2	RB	Jérôme Fernandez	7 March 1977 (aged 31)	1.99 m	262	1042	(Spain) FC Barcelona Handbol
3	P	Didier Dinart	18 January 1977 (aged 31)	1.97 m	288	136	(Spain) BM Ciudad Real
4	RB	Cédric Burdet	15 November 1974 (aged 33)	1.95 m	220	476	(France) Montpellier HB
5	P	Guillaume Gille	16 July 1976 (aged 32)	1.92 m	245	614	(Germany) HSV Handball
6	CB	Bertrand Gille	24 March 1978 (aged 30)	1.87 m	211	654	(Germany) HSV Handball
8	CB	Daniel Narcisse	16 December 1979 (aged 28)	1.89 m	171	524	(France) Chambéry Savoie Handball
11	LW	Olivier Girault	22 February 1973 (aged 35)	1.83 m	240	551	(France) Paris Handball
12	GK	Daouda Karaboué	11 December 1975 (aged 32)	1.98 m	64		(France) Montpellier HB
13	LB	Nikola Karabatić	11 April 1984 (aged 24)	1.95 m	120	515	(Germany) THW Kiel
14	P	Cristophe Kempe	2 May 1975 (aged 33)	1.93 m	161	249	(France) Fénix Toulouse
16	GK	Thierry Omeyer	2 November 1976 (aged 31)	1.92 m	194		(Germany) THW Kiel
18	RB	Joël Abati	25 April 1970 (aged 38)	1.90 m	196	577	(France) Montpellier HB
19	RW	Luc Abalo	6 September 1984 (aged 23)	1.82 m	74	247	(France) US d'Ivry Handball
21	LW	Michaël Guigou	28 January 1982 (aged 26)	1.79 m	100	351	(France) Montpellier HB
26	LW	Cédric Paty	25 July 1981 (aged 27)	1.94 m	17	44	(France) Chambéry Savoie Handball

=== Poland ===
The following is the Poland roster in the men's handball tournament of the 2008 Summer Olympics.

Head coach: Bogdan Wenta

No.	Pos.	Name	Date of birth (age)	Height	App.	Goals	Club
1	GK	Sławomir Szmal	2 October 1978 (aged 29)	1.90 m	140	1	(Germany) Rhein-Neckar Löwen
2	CB	Bartłomiej Jaszka	16 June 1983 (aged 25)	1.84 m	45	49	(Germany) Füchse Berlin
3	RB	Krzysztof Lijewski	7 July 1983 (aged 25)	1.98 m	62	100	(Germany) HSV Handball
5	LW	Mateusz Jachlewski	27 December 1984 (aged 23)	1.82 m	62	152	(Poland) Vive Targi Kielce
6	CB	Grzegorz Tkaczyk	22 December 1980 (aged 27)	1.94 m	115	435	(Germany) Rhein-Neckar Löwen
8	LB	Karol Bielecki	23 January 1982 (aged 26)	2.02 m	106	510	(Germany) Rhein-Neckar Löwen
9	P	Artur Siódmiak	7 October 1975 (aged 32)	1.92 m	75	74	(Germany) TuS Nettelstedt
13	P	Bartosz Jurecki	31 January 1979 (aged 29)	1.93 m	83	273	(Germany) SC Magdeburg
14	RW	Mariusz Jurasik	4 May 1976 (aged 32)	1.92 m	151	551	(Germany) Rhein-Neckar Löwen
15	LB	Michał Jurecki	24 October 1984 (aged 23)	2.02 m	59	103	(Germany) TuS Nettelstedt
16	GK	Marcin Wichary	17 February 1980 (aged 28)	1.93 m	60	0	(Poland) Wisła Płock
19	LW	Tomasz Tłuczyński	19 April 1979 (aged 29)	1.82 m	49	179	(Germany) TSV Hannover-Burgdorf
22	RB	Marcin Lijewski	21 September 1977 (aged 30)	1.97 m	183	558	(Germany) SG Flensburg-Handewitt
28	RW	Paweł Piwko	7 October 1982 (aged 25)	1.88 m	0	0	(Poland) Chrobry Głogów

=== Spain ===
The following is the Spain roster in the men's handball tournament of the 2008 Summer Olympics.

Head coach: Juan Carlos Pastor

No.	Pos.	Name	Date of birth (age)	Height	App.	Goals	Club
1	GK	Jose Javier Hombrados	7 April 1972 (aged 36)	1.97 m	175	1	(Spain) BM Ciudad Real
2	LB	Alberto Entrerrios	7 November 1976 (aged 31)	1.92 m	164	505	(Spain) BM Ciudad Real
4	RW	Albert Rocas	16 June 1982 (aged 26)	1.88 m	68	275	(Spain) FC Barcelona Handbol
5	CB	Raul Entrerrios	12 February 1981 (aged 27)	1.85 m	83	180	(Spain) BM Valladolid
6	P	Ruben Garabaya	15 September 1978 (aged 29)	2.01 m	98	212	(Spain) FC Barcelona Handbol
7	P	Carlos Prieto	2 February 1980 (aged 28)	2.04 m	66	73	(Spain) BM Valladolid
8	RB	Jon Belaustegui	19 March 1979 (aged 29)	1.95 m	83	185	(Spain) CB Ciudad de Logroño
11	LB	Demetrio Lozano	26 September 1975 (aged 32)	1.96 m	210	449	(Spain) FC Barcelona Handbol
15	LW	David Davis	25 October 1976 (aged 31)	1.85 m	78	115	(Spain) BM Ciudad Real
16	GK	David Barrufet	4 June 1970 (aged 38)	1.97 m	259	1	(Spain) FC Barcelona Handbol
17	LW	Juanín García	28 August 1977 (aged 30)	1.76 m	128	508	(Spain) FC Barcelona Handbol
18	LB	Iker Romero	15 June 1980 (aged 28)	1.96 m	127	480	(Spain) FC Barcelona Handbol
21	RB	Cristian Malmagro	11 March 1983 (aged 25)	1.97 m	13	33	(Spain) SDC San Antonio
27	RW	Víctor Tomás	15 February 1985 (aged 23)	1.76 m	23	70	(Spain) FC Barcelona Handbol

== Group B ==
=== Denmark ===
The following is the Denmark roster in the men's handball tournament of the 2008 Summer Olympics.

Head coach: Ulrik Wilbek

No.	Pos.	Name	Date of birth (age)	Height	App.	Goals	Club
1	GK	Kasper Hvidt	6 February 1976 (aged 32)	1.92 m	184	1	(Spain) FC Barcelona Handbol
4	LB	Lasse Boesen	18 September 1979 (aged 28)	1.91 m	101	302	(Germany) SG Flensburg-Handewitt
6	RB	Lars Troels Jørgensen	3 February 1978 (aged 30)	1.92 m	158	136	(Spain) SDC San Antonio
7	CB	Jesper Jensen	30 October 1977 (aged 30)	1.88 m	92	192	(Denmark) Skjern Håndbold
9	LW	Lars Christiansen	18 April 1972 (aged 36)	1.82 m	266	999	(Germany) SG Flensburg-Handewitt
12	GK	Peter Henriksen	20 August 1972 (aged 35)	1.84 m	61	0	(Denmark) GOG Svendborg
13	LB	Bo Spellerberg	24 July 1979 (aged 29)	1.92 m	121	173	(Denmark) KIF Kolding
14	P	Michael V. Knudsen	4 September 1978 (aged 29)	1.92 m	184	615	(Germany) SG Flensburg-Handewitt
15	LB	Mikkel Hansen (Note: Replaced Michael V. Knudsen who suffered from appendicitis, and sent home shortly after the first match.)	22 October 1987 (aged 20)	1.94 m	9	27	(Spain) FC Barcelona Handbol
19	P	Jesper Nøddesbo	23 October 1980 (aged 27)	1.99 m	97	186	(Spain) FC Barcelona Handbol
22	RB	Kasper Søndergaard	9 June 1981 (aged 27)	1.91 m	40	98	(Denmark) KIF Kolding
23	CB	Joachim Boldsen	30 April 1978 (aged 30)	1.87 m	176	395	(Spain) FC Barcelona Handbol
24	RW	Hans Lindberg	1 August 1981 (aged 27)	1.88 m	71	160	(Germany) HSV Hamburg
25	RB	Klavs Bruun Jørgensen	3 April 1974 (aged 34)	1.80 m	169	410	(Denmark) FCK Handball
26	LB	Kasper Nielsen	9 June 1975 (aged 33)	1.94 m	120	266	(Germany) SG Flensburg-Handewitt

=== Egypt ===
The following is the Egypt roster in the men's handball tournament of the 2008 Summer Olympics.

Head coach: (Croatia) Irfan Smajlagic

No.	Pos.	Name	Date of birth (age)	Height	App.	Goals	Club
4	LB	Hussein Mabrouk	30 March 1980 (aged 28)	1.94 m			(Egypt) Al-Ahly
5	RW	Mustafa Hussien	8 January 1984 (aged 24)	1.96 m			(Egypt) Al-Ahly
6	RB	Ahmed El Ahmar	27 January 1984 (aged 24)	1.83 m			(Egypt) Zamalek
8	P	Mohamed Ramadan	7 March 1984 (aged 24)	1.93 m			(Egypt) Al-Ahly
10	RB	Abouelfetoh Abdelrazek	12 February 1987 (aged 21)	1.85 m			(Egypt) Smouha
11	CB	Mahmoud Hassaballah	22 November 1986 (aged 21)	1.85 m			(Egypt) El-Olympi
12	GK	Mohamed Bakir El-Nakib	6 April 1974 (aged 34)	1.92 m			(Egypt) El-Olympi
14	LB	Hassan Mabrouk	29 July 1982 (aged 26)	1.88 m			(Egypt) Al-Ahly
15	LB	Mohamed Abd El-Salam	12 January 1982 (aged 26)	1.94 m			(Egypt) Zamalek
16	GK	Walid Abdel Maksoud	14 June 1979 (aged 29)	1.92 m			(Egypt) Zamalek
17	LW	Belal Mabrouk	2 August 1984 (aged 24)	1.86 m			(Egypt) Al-Ahly
18	P	Hany El-Fakharany	6 April 1978 (aged 30)	1.83 m			(Germany) Füchse Berlin
19	CB	Hassan Yousry	10 May 1978 (aged 30)	1.88 m			(Egypt) Zamalek
20	LB	Hussein Zaky	1 March 1979 (aged 29)	1.93 m			(Spain) BM Aragón

=== Germany ===
The following is the Germany roster in the men's handball tournament of the 2008 Summer Olympics.

Head coach: Heiner Brand

No.	Pos.	Name	Date of birth (age)	Height	App.	Goals	Club
1	GK	Henning Fritz	21 September 1974 (aged 33)	1.88 m	235		(Germany) Rhein-Neckar Löwen
2	LB	Pascal Hens	26 March 1980 (aged 28)	2.03 m	150	441	(Germany) HSV Hamburg
4	P	Oliver Roggisch	25 August 1978 (aged 29)	2.02 m	94	24	(Germany) Rhein-Neckar Löwen
5	LW	Dominik Klein	16 December 1983 (aged 24)	1.90 m	70	143	(Germany) THW Kiel
8	P	Christian Schwarzer	23 October 1969 (aged 38)	1.96 m	314	957	(Germany) Rhein-Neckar Löwen
10	CB	Oliver Kohrmann	28 July 1976 (aged 32)	1.86 m	12	12	(Germany) Wilhelmshavener HV
11	RB	Holger Glandorf	30 March 1983 (aged 25)	1.95 m	87	283	(Germany) HSG Nordhorn
12	GK	Johannes Bitter	2 September 1982 (aged 25)	2.04 m	94	2	(Germany) HSV Hamburg
13	CB	Sven-Sören Christophersen	9 May 1985 (aged 23)	1.98 m	9	18	(Germany) HSG Wetzlar
14	RB	Christian Zeitz	18 November 1980 (aged 27)	1.85 m	161	456	(Germany) THW Kiel
15	LW	Torsten Jansen	23 December 1976 (aged 31)	1.85 m	143	393	(Germany) HSV Hamburg
17	P	Andrej Klimovets	18 August 1974 (aged 33)	1.96 m	67	167	(Germany) Rhein-Neckar Löwen
18	RB	Michael Kraus	28 September 1983 (aged 24)	1.87 m	65	169	(Germany) TBV Lemgo
19	RW	Florian Kehrmann	26 June 1977 (aged 31)	1.86 m	218	798	(Germany) TBV Lemgo
24	CB	Michael Haaß	12 December 1983 (aged 24)	1.94 m	20	20	(Germany) TSV GWD Minden

=== Iceland ===
The following is the Iceland roster in the men's handball tournament of the 2008 Summer Olympics.

Head coach: Guðmundur Guðmundsson

No.	Pos.	Name	Date of birth (age)	Height	App.	Goals	Club
1	GK	Björgvin Páll Gústavsson	24 May 1985 (aged 23)	1.90 m	25	1	(Germany) TV Bittenfeld
3	LB	Logi Eldon Geirsson	10 October 1982 (aged 25)	1.91 m	63	171	(Germany) TBV Lemgo
5	P	Sigfús Sigurðsson	7 May 1975 (aged 33)	1.98 m	142	301	(Iceland) Valur
6	RB	Ásgeir Örn Hallgrímsson	17 February 1984 (aged 24)	1.91 m	83	116	(Denmark) GOG Svendborg
7	LB	Arnór Atlason	23 July 1984 (aged 24)	1.91 m	58	98	(Denmark) FCK Handball
9	LB	Guðjón Valur Sigurðsson	8 August 1979 (aged 29)	1.87 m	191	885	(Germany) VfL Gummersbach
10	CB	Snorri Guðjónsson	17 October 1981 (aged 26)	1.87 m	123	401	(Denmark) GOG Svendborg
11	RB	Ólafur Stefánsson	3 July 1973 (aged 35)	1.96 m	263	1250	(Spain) BM Ciudad Real
14	LW	Sturla Ásgeirsson	20 July 1980 (aged 28)	1.86 m	6	11	(Denmark) Aarhus GF Håndbold
15	RW	Alexander Petersson	2 July 1980 (aged 28)	1.86 m	65	249	(Germany) SG Flensburg-Handewitt
16	GK	Hreiðar Guðmundsson	29 November 1980 (aged 27)	1.93 m	57	0	(Sweden) IK Sävehof
17	P	Sverre Andreas Jakobsson	8 February 1977 (aged 31)	1.96 m	44	12	(Iceland) HK Kopavogur
18	P	Róbert Gunnarsson	22 May 1980 (aged 28)	1.90 m	118	370	(Germany) VfL Gummersbach
19	LB	Ingimundur Ingimundarson	29 January 1980 (aged 28)	1.93 m	27	34	(Norway) Elverum Håndball

=== South Korea ===
The following is the South Korea roster in the women's handball tournament of the 2008 Summer Olympics.

Head coach: Kim Tae-hoon

No.	Pos.	Name	Date of birth (age)	Height	App.	Goals	Club
1	GK	Han Kyung-tai	11 April 1975 (aged 33)	1.91 m			(Switzerland) TSV St. Otmar
2	CB	Jeong Yi-kyeong	28 February 1985 (aged 23)	1.88 m			(South Korea) Doosan
6	LW	Kim Tea-wan	15 February 1980 (aged 28)	1.83 m			(South Korea) Chungnam
7	RW	Jung Su-young	17 October 1985 (aged 22)	1.84 m			(South Korea) HC Korosa
8	P	Park Jung-gyu	2 November 1983 (aged 24)	1.90 m			(South Korea) Doosan
10	P	Park Chan-yong	1 January 1980 (aged 28)	1.89 m			(South Korea) Incheon DTC
13	RB	Yoon Kyung-shin	7 July 1973 (aged 35)	2.03 m			(South Korea) Doosan
14	RW	Cho Chi-hyo	6 December 1970 (aged 37)	1.92 m			(Germany) HBW Balingen-Weilstetten
15	LW	Lee Tea-young	25 November 1977 (aged 30)	1.74 m			(South Korea) Incheon DTC
16	GK	Kang Il-koo	26 April 1976 (aged 32)	1.84 m			(South Korea) Incheon DTC
17	RB	Lee Jae-woo	28 September 1979 (aged 28)	1.82 m			(Japan) Daido Steel
18	LB	Paek Won-chul	10 January 1977 (aged 31)	1.80 m			(Japan) Daido Steel
20	CB	Ko Kyung-soo	5 February 1985 (aged 23)	1.82 m			(South Korea) Chungnam
23	LB	Yoon Kyung-min	31 October 1979 (aged 28)	1.93 m			(South Korea) Chungnam

=== Russia ===
The following is the Russia roster in the men's handball tournament of the 2008 Summer Olympics.

Head coach: Vladimir Maksimov

No.	Pos.	Name	Date of birth (age)	Height	App.	Goals	Club
1	GK	Oleg Grams	20 February 1984 (aged 24)	2.01 m	33	0	(Russia) Chekhovskiye Medvedi
2	CB	Vasily Filippov	18 January 1981 (aged 27)	1.83 m	69	152	(Russia) Chekhovskiye Medvedi
6	RB	Denis Krivoshlykov	10 May 1971 (aged 37)	1.80 m	170	468	(Spain) CB Ademar León
8	P	Egor Evdokimov	9 March 1982 (aged 26)	2.03 m	69	103	(Russia) Chekhovskiye Medvedi
10	P	Alexander Chernoivanov	13 February 1979 (aged 29)	2.01 m	48	80	(Russia) Chekhovskiye Medvedi
15	LB	Alexey Rastvortsev	12 August 1978 (aged 29)	2.01 m	181	703	(Russia) Chekhovskiye Medvedi
16	GK	Alexey Kostygov	5 July 1973 (aged 35)	1.91 m	103	0	(Russia) Chekhovskiye Medvedi
17	RB	Alexey Kamanin	6 June 1978 (aged 30)	1.98 m	148	319	(Russia) Chekhovskiye Medvedi
19	LB	Samvel Aslanyan	23 February 1986 (aged 22)	1.88 m	14	15	(Russia) Chekhovskiye Medvedi
23	LW	Eduard Kokcharov	4 December 1975 (aged 32)	1.85 m	199	1023	(Slovenia) Celje Pivovarna Laško
25	RW	Dmitry Kovalev	15 May 1982 (aged 26)	1.80 m	64	131	(Russia) Chekhovskiye Medvedi
31	LW	Timur Dibirov	30 July 1983 (aged 25)	1.80 m	51	133	(Russia) Chekhovskiye Medvedi
35	RB	Konstantin Igropulo	14 April 1985 (aged 23)	1.91 m	45	182	(Russia) Chekhovskiye Medvedi
77	CB	Vitali Ivanov	3 February 1976 (aged 32)	1.93 m	180	443	(Russia) Chekhovskiye Medvedi
