= Handball at the 2006 Asian Games – Men's tournament =

Asian Games event

Men at the 2006 Asian Games
- Venue: Al-Gharafa Indoor Hall
- Date: 3–14 December 2006
- Competitors: 232 from 15 nations

Medalists
gold medal	Kuwait
silver medal	Qatar
bronze medal	Iran

Men's handball at the 2006 Asian Games was held in Al-Gharafa Indoor Hall, Al-Rayyan from 3 December 3 to 14 December 2006.

== Squads ==
Bahrain	China	Hong Kong	India
Ali Yusuf; Jasim Mohamed; Ahmed Tarrada; Husain Jasim Fakher; Hasan Madan; Abdulrahman Mohamed; Jaafar Abdulqader; Sadiq Ali; Husain Al-Qaidoom; Mahmood Abdulqader; Mahdi Madan; Ahmed Al-Naser; Ahmed Al-Tajer; Abbas Malalla; Sayed Majeed Al-Mosawi; Tayseer Mohsen	Yan Liang; Zhu Xinchen; Zhou Xiaojian; Zhang Zhiyu; Liu Zipeng; Tian Jianxia; Ding Dawei; Wang Xiaolong; Hao Kexin; Miao Qing; Wang Xing; Ye Qiang; Cui Liang	Chan Kwok Hing; Hui Man Pong; Chan Wan Man; Chan Wing Cheong; Charm Wing Kei; Cheung Kin Kwok; Chan Kwong Yue; Ip Shi Yan; Lam Ka Wai; Lin Ming Fai; Ko Tsz Yan; Leung Hoi Yip; Roger Ho; Yiu Tai Wai; Tse Wai Hei; Ng Wan Lung	Sachin Bhaskar Wagh; Sukhdev Singh; Firoz Ahmad Khan; Binu Vasu; Rasheed Khan; Rakesh Kumar; K. Praseed Kumar; Pawan Kumar; Naya Chandra Singh; Gaurav Sehgal; Kunal Sharma; Anand Natraj Shyamala; Prem Kumar; Mohinder Singh Rawat; Sachin Chaudhary; Ratish Kumar Pandey
Iran	Japan	Kuwait	Lebanon
Iman Ehsannejad; Mohammad Reza Rajabi; Mohammad Reza Jafarnia; Hani Zamani; Masoud Zohrabi; Saeid Pourghasemi; Mostafa Sadati; Allahkaram Esteki; Farid Alimoradi; Alireza Rabie; Hossein Shahabi; Ali Akbar Khoshnevis; Rasoul Dehghani; Peyman Sadeghi; Hojjat Rahshenas	Takayuki Shimizu; Katsuaki Matsubayashi; Kenji Toyoda; Seiichi Maeda; Kyosuke Tomita; Daisuke Miyazaki; Norikazu Higashi; Hideaki Nagashima; Toru Takeda; Yoshio Nakagawa; Toshihiro Tsubone; Yoshiyuki Nakahata; Takashi Takagi; Masayuki Kagawa; Masakatsu Izuma; Tetsuya Kadoyama	Torki Al-Khalidi; Bader Abbas; Abdulaziz Al-Zoabi; Faisal Al-Mutairi; Saleh Al-Jaimaz; Husain Siwan; Fahad Rabie; Abdullah Al-Theyab; Yousef Al-Fadhli; Ali Al-Haddad; Mahdi Al-Qallaf; Meshal Swailem; Hamad Al-Rashidi; Ali Al-Mithin; Saad Al-Azemi; Ali Murad	Hassan Sakr; Akram El-Cheikh Hussein; Kassem Assaf; Ahmad Chahine; Maher Hamdar; Mahmoud Barakat; Mohammad Hamdar; Rabih Mazloum; Jad Badra; Bilal Akil; Philippe Tamer; Bassam Farasha; Khoder Al-Nahass; Zoulfikar Daher; Imad Kaafarani; Sami Hamdar
Macau	Qatar	Saudi Arabia	South Korea
Chan Ka Chung; Chau Hong Cheng; Lei Hou Ieong; Lei Seng Hong; Ho Kin Seng; Cheang Kin Long; Kuok Weng Hang; Leong Weng Mun; Kou Weng Kin; Mok Ka Chon; Vong Vai Tin; Lao Ka Seng; Cheong Ka Ho; Lei Kio Chon; Sou Kwok Ho; Sou Pui Kei	Anas Al-Suweidan; Adnan Al-Ali; Khalid Al-Hashmi; Rashid Al-Remaihi; Samir Hashim; Abdulla Saad Al-Saad; Mohamed Bajawi; Mohammed Walid Ghazal; Ahmed Saad Al-Saad; Mubarak Bilal Al-Ali; Mohsin Yafai; Yousef Ashoor; Fawaz Al-Moadhadi; Khalid Al-Marri; Yousef Al-Maalem; Badi Johar	Abdullah Al-Abdulali; Qusai Al-Saeed; Yasser Shakhor; Hussain Al-Ekhwan; Turki Al-Bedhy; Abdullah Al-Dossari; Ali Al-Saihati; Manaf Al-Saeed; Sultan Al-Obaidi; Nabil Al-Obaidi; Ahmed Al-Enbaawi; Mohammed Al-Salem; Faisal Al-Flati; Talal Al-Suraihi; Bandar Al-Harbi; Turki Al-Enbaawi	Han Kyung-tai; Ko Kyung-soo; Park Jung-geu; Kim Jang-moon; Park Kyung-suk; Paek Won-chul; Park Chan-young; Park Jong-pyo; Yoon Ci-yoel; Lee Tea-young; Lee Jae-woo; Yu Dong-geun; Yoon Kyung-shin; Kim Tea-wan; Lee Byung-ho; Lee Jun-hee
Syria	United Arab Emirates	Uzbekistan	
Tarek Al-Cheikh Musa; Amin Al-Hussein; Obaeda Al-Abd; Saher Hmedi; Kasem Swedan; Saji Mahamid; Mohammad Hadad; Al-Nmeri Al-Cheikh Musa; Mosab Al-Jondy; Bassel Al-Rayes; Sahib Al-Azawi; Rami Al-Jahmani; Mohammad Al-Hasan; Mustafa Al-Karad; Firas Ahmad; Ahmad Mahamid	Abdulrahman Al-Nuaimi; Omar Al-Khani; Hamad Khalfan; Ali Saqer; Omran Al-Marzouqi; Abdulla Al-Saffar; Ahmed Saqer; Kazim Al-Saffar; Khalid Ahmed Al-Balooshi; Abdulrazzak Al-Hashemi; Nabil Bin Ashour; Ibrahim Ibrahim; Jasim Al-Ali; Juma Al-Kaabi; Mohamed Hassan Al-Balooshi; Abdulla Al-Hammadi	Damir Kurbanov; Rustam Usarov; Zafar Azimov; Aleksey Shevchenko; Erkinbay Normatov; Sherzodbek Kasimov; Evgeniy Iskhakbaev; Bahromjon Madaminov; Akramjon Otajonov; Ulugbek Ikromov; Alimjan Egemsaparov; Jasurbek Abdullaev	

== Results ==
All times are Arabia Standard Time (UTC+03:00)

=== Preliminary league ===
==== Group A ====
Pos	Team	Pld	W	D	L	GF	GA	GD	Pts	Qualification
1	Qatar	3	3	0	0	129	56	+73	6	Main round
2	Bahrain	3	2	0	1	125	70	+55	4	Main round
3	India	3	1	0	2	80	109	−29	2	Placement 9–12
4	Macau	3	0	0	3	37	136	−99	0	Placement 13–15

Source: Results

3 December; 10:00	Bahrain	53–11	Macau	Al-Gharafa Indoor Hall, Al-Rayyan; Referees: Kim, Kim (KOR)
3 December; 10:00	M. Abdulqader 11	(27–5)	four players 2	Al-Gharafa Indoor Hall, Al-Rayyan; Referees: Kim, Kim (KOR)
3 December; 10:00	3× (yellow card) 2× (suspension)		2× (yellow card) 2× (suspension)	Al-Gharafa Indoor Hall, Al-Rayyan; Referees: Kim, Kim (KOR)

3 December; 18:00	Qatar	48–19	India	Al-Gharafa Indoor Hall, Al-Rayyan; Referees: Ossipov, Porol (KAZ)
3 December; 18:00	Ah. Al-Saad 12	(19–9)	F. Khan 6	Al-Gharafa Indoor Hall, Al-Rayyan; Referees: Ossipov, Porol (KAZ)
3 December; 18:00	3× (yellow card) 4× (suspension)		2× (yellow card) 3× (suspension)	Al-Gharafa Indoor Hall, Al-Rayyan; Referees: Ossipov, Porol (KAZ)

4 December; 12:00	India	31–14	Macau	Al-Gharafa Indoor Hall, Al-Rayyan; Referees: Abdulhusain, Khalaf (KUW)
4 December; 12:00	N. Singh 12	(17–5)	Chau, Kuok 3	Al-Gharafa Indoor Hall, Al-Rayyan; Referees: Abdulhusain, Khalaf (KUW)
4 December; 12:00	4× (yellow card) 3× (suspension)		3× (yellow card) 4× (suspension)	Al-Gharafa Indoor Hall, Al-Rayyan; Referees: Abdulhusain, Khalaf (KUW)

5 December; 12:00	Bahrain	47–30	India	Al-Gharafa Indoor Hall, Al-Rayyan; Referees: Liu, Liu (CHN)
5 December; 12:00	M. Abdulqader 10	(22–15)	N. Singh 9	Al-Gharafa Indoor Hall, Al-Rayyan; Referees: Liu, Liu (CHN)
5 December; 12:00	3× (yellow card) 6× (suspension)		3× (yellow card) 2× (suspension) 1× (red card)	Al-Gharafa Indoor Hall, Al-Rayyan; Referees: Liu, Liu (CHN)

5 December; 20:00	Qatar	52–12	Macau	Al-Gharafa Indoor Hall, Al-Rayyan; Referees: Kim, Kim (KOR)
5 December; 20:00	Al-Suweidan, A. Al-Ali 8	(24–5)	Lao 4	Al-Gharafa Indoor Hall, Al-Rayyan; Referees: Kim, Kim (KOR)
5 December; 20:00	3× (yellow card) 2× (suspension)		3× (yellow card) 4× (suspension)	Al-Gharafa Indoor Hall, Al-Rayyan; Referees: Kim, Kim (KOR)

6 December; 18:00	Bahrain	25–29	Qatar	Al-Gharafa Indoor Hall, Al-Rayyan; Referees: Tanji, Samha (SYR)
6 December; 18:00	four players 5	(13–10)	Ah. Al-Saad 9	Al-Gharafa Indoor Hall, Al-Rayyan; Referees: Tanji, Samha (SYR)
6 December; 18:00	4× (yellow card) 10× (suspension) 2× (red card)		2× (yellow card) 7× (suspension)	Al-Gharafa Indoor Hall, Al-Rayyan; Referees: Tanji, Samha (SYR)

==== Group B ====
Pos	Team	Pld	W	D	L	GF	GA	GD	Pts	Qualification
1	Kuwait	3	3	0	0	105	68	+37	6	Main round
2	Iran	3	2	0	1	85	74	+11	4	Main round
3	China	3	1	0	2	78	83	−5	2	Placement 9–12
4	Hong Kong	3	0	0	3	64	107	−43	0	Placement 13–15

Source: Results

3 December; 16:00	China	25–27	Iran	Al-Gharafa Indoor Hall, Al-Rayyan; Referees: Al-Suwaidi, Al-Marzouqi (UAE)
3 December; 16:00	Zhu 7	(10–15)	Rabie 6	Al-Gharafa Indoor Hall, Al-Rayyan; Referees: Al-Suwaidi, Al-Marzouqi (UAE)
3 December; 16:00	4× (yellow card) 4× (suspension)		3× (yellow card) 9× (suspension) 1× (red card)	Al-Gharafa Indoor Hall, Al-Rayyan; Referees: Al-Suwaidi, Al-Marzouqi (UAE)

4 December; 10:00	China	30–23	Hong Kong	Al-Gharafa Indoor Hall, Al-Rayyan; Referees: Ogasawara, Hamada (JPN)
4 December; 10:00	Wang Xia. 7	(18–10)	Cheung, Ho 4	Al-Gharafa Indoor Hall, Al-Rayyan; Referees: Ogasawara, Hamada (JPN)
4 December; 10:00	3× (yellow card) 3× (suspension)		3× (yellow card) 4× (suspension)	Al-Gharafa Indoor Hall, Al-Rayyan; Referees: Ogasawara, Hamada (JPN)

4 December; 16:00	Kuwait	31–22	Iran	Al-Gharafa Indoor Hall, Al-Rayyan; Referees: Hirzallah, Al-Shoubaki (JOR)
4 December; 16:00	Swailem 7	(16–12)	Esteki 8	Al-Gharafa Indoor Hall, Al-Rayyan; Referees: Hirzallah, Al-Shoubaki (JOR)
4 December; 16:00	3× (yellow card) 2× (suspension)		2× (yellow card) 6× (suspension) 1× (red card)	Al-Gharafa Indoor Hall, Al-Rayyan; Referees: Hirzallah, Al-Shoubaki (JOR)

5 December; 14:00	Hong Kong	18–36	Iran	Al-Gharafa Indoor Hall, Al-Rayyan; Referees: Ogasawara, Hamada (JPN)
5 December; 14:00	Ip, Ho 4	(10–13)	Esteki 11	Al-Gharafa Indoor Hall, Al-Rayyan; Referees: Ogasawara, Hamada (JPN)
5 December; 14:00	4× (yellow card) 3× (suspension)		3× (yellow card) 6× (suspension)	Al-Gharafa Indoor Hall, Al-Rayyan; Referees: Ogasawara, Hamada (JPN)

5 December; 18:00	Kuwait	33–23	China	Al-Gharafa Indoor Hall, Al-Rayyan; Referees: Al-Suwaidi, Al-Marzouqi (UAE)
5 December; 18:00	Murad 6	(18–9)	Zhu 7	Al-Gharafa Indoor Hall, Al-Rayyan; Referees: Al-Suwaidi, Al-Marzouqi (UAE)
5 December; 18:00	3× (yellow card) 2× (suspension)		3× (yellow card) 3× (suspension)	Al-Gharafa Indoor Hall, Al-Rayyan; Referees: Al-Suwaidi, Al-Marzouqi (UAE)

6 December; 14:00	Kuwait	41–23	Hong Kong	Al-Gharafa Indoor Hall, Al-Rayyan; Referees: Al-Qarni, Al-Dossary (KSA)
6 December; 14:00	Al-Theyab, Al-Mithin 6	(20–14)	Ip 6	Al-Gharafa Indoor Hall, Al-Rayyan; Referees: Al-Qarni, Al-Dossary (KSA)
6 December; 14:00	3× (yellow card) 5× (suspension)		3× (yellow card) 5× (suspension)	Al-Gharafa Indoor Hall, Al-Rayyan; Referees: Al-Qarni, Al-Dossary (KSA)

==== Group C ====
Pos	Team	Pld	W	D	L	GF	GA	GD	Pts	Qualification
1	Saudi Arabia	3	3	0	0	110	77	+33	6	Main round
2	Japan	3	2	0	1	115	76	+39	4	Main round
3	United Arab Emirates	3	1	0	2	95	94	+1	2	Placement 9–12
4	Uzbekistan	3	0	0	3	80	153	−73	0	Placement 13–15

Source: Results

3 December; 12:00	Japan	56–30	Uzbekistan	Al-Gharafa Indoor Hall, Al-Rayyan; Referees: Liu, Liu (CHN)
3 December; 12:00	Toyoda 8	(31–12)	Egemsaparov 9	Al-Gharafa Indoor Hall, Al-Rayyan; Referees: Liu, Liu (CHN)
3 December; 12:00	3× (yellow card) 2× (suspension)		2× (yellow card) 4× (suspension)	Al-Gharafa Indoor Hall, Al-Rayyan; Referees: Liu, Liu (CHN)

3 December; 20:00	United Arab Emirates	29–33	Saudi Arabia	Al-Gharafa Indoor Hall, Al-Rayyan; Referees: Tanji, Samha (SYR)
3 December; 20:00	Al-Ali 6	(11–17)	Al-Ekhwan 9	Al-Gharafa Indoor Hall, Al-Rayyan; Referees: Tanji, Samha (SYR)
3 December; 20:00	3× (yellow card) 2× (suspension)		2× (yellow card) 6× (suspension)	Al-Gharafa Indoor Hall, Al-Rayyan; Referees: Tanji, Samha (SYR)

4 December; 18:00	Japan	25–26	Saudi Arabia	Al-Gharafa Indoor Hall, Al-Rayyan; Referees: Al-Hail, Al-Hamad (QAT)
4 December; 18:00	Miyazaki 6	(11–11)	Al-Harbi 10	Al-Gharafa Indoor Hall, Al-Rayyan; Referees: Al-Hail, Al-Hamad (QAT)
4 December; 18:00	4× (yellow card) 3× (suspension) 1× (red card)		4× (yellow card) 3× (suspension) 1× (red card)	Al-Gharafa Indoor Hall, Al-Rayyan; Referees: Al-Hail, Al-Hamad (QAT)

4 December; 20:00	United Arab Emirates	46–27	Uzbekistan	Al-Gharafa Indoor Hall, Al-Rayyan; Referees: Dib, Haidar (LIB)
4 December; 20:00	Al-Khani, A. Al-Saffar, Ah. Saqer 8	(24–19)	Egemsaparov 8	Al-Gharafa Indoor Hall, Al-Rayyan; Referees: Dib, Haidar (LIB)
4 December; 20:00	3× (yellow card) 3× (suspension) 1× (red card)		3× (yellow card) 2× (suspension)	Al-Gharafa Indoor Hall, Al-Rayyan; Referees: Dib, Haidar (LIB)

5 December; 16:00	Japan	34–20	United Arab Emirates	Al-Gharafa Indoor Hall, Al-Rayyan; Referees: Karbaschi, Kolahdouzan (IRI)
5 December; 16:00	Kadoyama 9	(15–11)	Ah. Saqer 5	Al-Gharafa Indoor Hall, Al-Rayyan; Referees: Karbaschi, Kolahdouzan (IRI)
5 December; 16:00	4× (yellow card) 6× (suspension)		4× (yellow card) 4× (suspension)	Al-Gharafa Indoor Hall, Al-Rayyan; Referees: Karbaschi, Kolahdouzan (IRI)

6 December; 16:00	Uzbekistan	23–51	Saudi Arabia	Al-Gharafa Indoor Hall, Al-Rayyan; Referees: Abdulhusain, Khalaf (KUW)
6 December; 16:00	Ikromov 8	(11–24)	T. Al-Enbaawi 12	Al-Gharafa Indoor Hall, Al-Rayyan; Referees: Abdulhusain, Khalaf (KUW)
6 December; 16:00	4× (yellow card) 8× (suspension) 1× (red card)		3× (yellow card) 5× (suspension) 1× (red card)	Al-Gharafa Indoor Hall, Al-Rayyan; Referees: Abdulhusain, Khalaf (KUW)

==== Group D ====
Pos	Team	Pld	W	D	L	GF	GA	GD	Pts	Qualification
1	South Korea	2	2	0	0	83	65	+18	4	Main round
2	Syria	2	1	0	1	73	66	+7	2	Main round
3	Lebanon	2	0	0	2	57	82	−25	0	Placement 9–12

Source: Results

3 December; 14:00	South Korea	38–36	Syria	Al-Gharafa Indoor Hall, Al-Rayyan; Referees: Karbaschi, Kolahdouzan (IRI)
3 December; 14:00	Lee J.H. 12	(18–17)	Al-Rayes 12	Al-Gharafa Indoor Hall, Al-Rayyan; Referees: Karbaschi, Kolahdouzan (IRI)
3 December; 14:00	2× (yellow card) 9× (suspension) 2× (red card)		4× (yellow card) 5× (suspension)	Al-Gharafa Indoor Hall, Al-Rayyan; Referees: Karbaschi, Kolahdouzan (IRI)

4 December; 14:00	Syria	37–28	Lebanon	Al-Gharafa Indoor Hall, Al-Rayyan; Referees: Al-Qarni, Al-Dossary (KSA)
4 December; 14:00	Swedan 9	(18–13)	Al-Nahass 10	Al-Gharafa Indoor Hall, Al-Rayyan; Referees: Al-Qarni, Al-Dossary (KSA)
4 December; 14:00	2× (yellow card) 3× (suspension)		3× (yellow card) 5× (suspension)	Al-Gharafa Indoor Hall, Al-Rayyan; Referees: Al-Qarni, Al-Dossary (KSA)

5 December; 10:00	South Korea	45–29	Lebanon	Al-Gharafa Indoor Hall, Al-Rayyan; Referees: Ossipov, Porol (KAZ)
5 December; 10:00	Kim T. 8	(23–11)	Al-Nahass 14	Al-Gharafa Indoor Hall, Al-Rayyan; Referees: Ossipov, Porol (KAZ)
5 December; 10:00	2× (yellow card) 8× (suspension) 1× (red card)		4× (yellow card) 13× (suspension) 1× (red card)	Al-Gharafa Indoor Hall, Al-Rayyan; Referees: Ossipov, Porol (KAZ)

=== Placement 13–15 ===
Placement 13–15
10 December
Macau	35
Uzbekistan	46

Placement 13–14
11 December
Uzbekistan	32
Hong Kong	35

==== Semifinals ====
10 December; 21:30	Macau	35–46	Uzbekistan	Al-Gharafa Indoor Hall, Al-Rayyan; Referees: Liu, Liu (CHN)
10 December; 21:30	Vong 8	(15–24)	Otajonov, Ikromov 9	Al-Gharafa Indoor Hall, Al-Rayyan; Referees: Liu, Liu (CHN)
10 December; 21:30	3× (yellow card) 3× (suspension)		3× (yellow card) 4× (suspension)	Al-Gharafa Indoor Hall, Al-Rayyan; Referees: Liu, Liu (CHN)

==== Placement 13–14 ====
11 December; 10:00	Uzbekistan	32–35	Hong Kong	Al-Gharafa Indoor Hall, Al-Rayyan; Referees: Ogasawara, Hamada (JPN)
11 December; 10:00	Normatov 8	(18–19)	Ip 9	Al-Gharafa Indoor Hall, Al-Rayyan; Referees: Ogasawara, Hamada (JPN)
11 December; 10:00	4× (yellow card) 11× (suspension) 3× (red card)		3× (yellow card) 2× (suspension) 2× (red card)	Al-Gharafa Indoor Hall, Al-Rayyan; Referees: Ogasawara, Hamada (JPN)

=== Placement 9–12 ===
Placement 9–12
10 December
India	28
United Arab Emirates	42
10 December
China	28
Lebanon	31

Placement 9–10
12 December
United Arab Emirates	29
Lebanon	31
Placement 11–12
11 December
India	33
China	34

==== Semifinals ====
10 December; 17:30	India	28–42	United Arab Emirates	Al-Gharafa Indoor Hall, Al-Rayyan; Referees: Kim, Kim (KOR)
10 December; 17:30	F. Khan 11	(10–27)	Al. Saqer 8	Al-Gharafa Indoor Hall, Al-Rayyan; Referees: Kim, Kim (KOR)
10 December; 17:30	3× (yellow card) 1× (suspension)		3× (yellow card) 2× (suspension)	Al-Gharafa Indoor Hall, Al-Rayyan; Referees: Kim, Kim (KOR)

10 December; 19:30	China	28–31	Lebanon	Al-Gharafa Indoor Hall, Al-Rayyan; Referees: Ogasawara, Hamada (JPN)
10 December; 19:30	Zhu, Zhang, Wang Xia. 5	(13–14)	Al-Nahass 12	Al-Gharafa Indoor Hall, Al-Rayyan; Referees: Ogasawara, Hamada (JPN)
10 December; 19:30	3× (yellow card) 10× (suspension) 2× (red card)		3× (yellow card) 5× (suspension) 1× (red card)	Al-Gharafa Indoor Hall, Al-Rayyan; Referees: Ogasawara, Hamada (JPN)

==== Placement 11–12 ====
11 December; 12:00	India	33–34	China	Al-Gharafa Indoor Hall, Al-Rayyan; Referees: Dib, Haidar (LIB)
11 December; 12:00	F. Khan 9	(14–18)	Wang Xia. 10	Al-Gharafa Indoor Hall, Al-Rayyan; Referees: Dib, Haidar (LIB)
11 December; 12:00	3× (yellow card) 3× (suspension) 1× (red card)		3× (yellow card) 3× (suspension)	Al-Gharafa Indoor Hall, Al-Rayyan; Referees: Dib, Haidar (LIB)

==== Placement 9–10 ====
12 December; 14:00	United Arab Emirates	29–31	Lebanon	Al-Gharafa Indoor Hall, Al-Rayyan; Referees: Ossipov, Porol (KAZ)
12 December; 14:00	A. Al-Saffar, Ah. Saqer 7	(12–12)	Daher 9	Al-Gharafa Indoor Hall, Al-Rayyan; Referees: Ossipov, Porol (KAZ)
12 December; 14:00	2× (yellow card) 9× (suspension) 1× (red card)		4× (yellow card) 9× (suspension) 1× (red card)	Al-Gharafa Indoor Hall, Al-Rayyan; Referees: Ossipov, Porol (KAZ)

=== Main round ===
==== Group E ====
Pos	Team	Pld	W	D	L	GF	GA	GD	Pts	Qualification
1	Qatar	3	3	0	0	66	45	+21	6	Semifinals
2	Iran	3	2	0	1	82	71	+11	4	Semifinals
3	Syria	3	1	0	2	80	84	−4	2	Placement 5–6
4	Saudi Arabia	3	0	0	3	44	72	−28	0	Placement 7–8

Source: Results

7 December; 18:00	Qatar	27–24	Iran	Al-Gharafa Indoor Hall, Al-Rayyan; Referees: Tanji, Samha (SYR)
7 December; 18:00	Ah. Al-Saad 11	(12–12)	Zamani, Esteki, Rahshenas 6	Al-Gharafa Indoor Hall, Al-Rayyan; Referees: Tanji, Samha (SYR)
7 December; 18:00	3× (yellow card) 3× (suspension)		3× (yellow card) 7× (suspension)	Al-Gharafa Indoor Hall, Al-Rayyan; Referees: Tanji, Samha (SYR)

7 December; 20:00	Saudi Arabia	25–34	Syria	Al-Gharafa Indoor Hall, Al-Rayyan; Referees: Hirzallah, Al-Shoubaki (JOR)
7 December; 20:00	Al-Ekhwan, Al-Bedhy, Al-Saihati 5	(11–15)	Al-Rayes 10	Al-Gharafa Indoor Hall, Al-Rayyan; Referees: Hirzallah, Al-Shoubaki (JOR)
7 December; 20:00	4× (yellow card) 9× (suspension) 1× (red card)		3× (yellow card) 4× (suspension) 1× (red card)	Al-Gharafa Indoor Hall, Al-Rayyan; Referees: Hirzallah, Al-Shoubaki (JOR)

8 December; 18:00	Qatar	29–21	Syria	Al-Gharafa Indoor Hall, Al-Rayyan; Referees: Abdulhusain, Khalaf (KUW)
8 December; 18:00	Ah. Al-Saad 9	(17–7)	Hadad 7	Al-Gharafa Indoor Hall, Al-Rayyan; Referees: Abdulhusain, Khalaf (KUW)
8 December; 18:00	3× (yellow card) 7× (suspension)		2× (yellow card) 8× (suspension) 2× (red card)	Al-Gharafa Indoor Hall, Al-Rayyan; Referees: Abdulhusain, Khalaf (KUW)

8 December; 20:00	Saudi Arabia	19–28	Iran	Al-Gharafa Indoor Hall, Al-Rayyan; Referees: Ossipov, Porol (KAZ)
8 December; 20:00	Al-Saihati 5	(8–15)	Esteki 5	Al-Gharafa Indoor Hall, Al-Rayyan; Referees: Ossipov, Porol (KAZ)
8 December; 20:00	3× (yellow card) 8× (suspension)		2× (yellow card) 9× (suspension)	Al-Gharafa Indoor Hall, Al-Rayyan; Referees: Ossipov, Porol (KAZ)

9 December; 18:00	Qatar	10–0	Saudi Arabia	Al-Gharafa Indoor Hall, Al-Rayyan; Referees: Al-Suwaidi, Al-Marzouqi (UAE)
9 December; 18:00		(Walkover)		Al-Gharafa Indoor Hall, Al-Rayyan; Referees: Al-Suwaidi, Al-Marzouqi (UAE)

9 December; 20:00	Syria	25–30	Iran	Al-Gharafa Indoor Hall, Al-Rayyan; Referees: Hirzallah, Al-Shoubaki (JOR)
9 December; 20:00	Swedan 9	(8–13)	Rahshenas 6	Al-Gharafa Indoor Hall, Al-Rayyan; Referees: Hirzallah, Al-Shoubaki (JOR)
9 December; 20:00	3× (yellow card) 5× (suspension)		3× (yellow card) 6× (suspension)	Al-Gharafa Indoor Hall, Al-Rayyan; Referees: Hirzallah, Al-Shoubaki (JOR)

==== Group F ====
Pos	Team	Pld	W	D	L	GF	GA	GD	Pts	Qualification
1	Kuwait	3	3	0	0	99	78	+21	6	Semifinals
2	South Korea	3	1	1	1	95	87	+8	3 (Note: Head-to-head result: KOR 26–26 JPN. Overall goal difference was used as the tiebreaker.)	Semifinals
3	Japan	3	1	1	1	75	85	−10	3	Placement 5–6
4	Bahrain	3	0	0	3	81	100	−19	0	Placement 7–8

Source: Results
Notes:

7 December; 14:00	Kuwait	35–24	Japan	Al-Gharafa Indoor Hall, Al-Rayyan; Referees: Karbaschi, Kolahdouzan (IRI)
7 December; 14:00	Al-Zoabi, Murad 7	(19–10)	Izuma 6	Al-Gharafa Indoor Hall, Al-Rayyan; Referees: Karbaschi, Kolahdouzan (IRI)
7 December; 14:00	3× (yellow card) 7× (suspension) 1× (red card)		3× (yellow card) 4× (suspension)	Al-Gharafa Indoor Hall, Al-Rayyan; Referees: Karbaschi, Kolahdouzan (IRI)

7 December; 16:00	South Korea	43–29	Bahrain	Al-Gharafa Indoor Hall, Al-Rayyan; Referees: Ossipov, Porol (KAZ)
7 December; 16:00	Paek 7	(21–15)	J. Abdulqader, M. Madan 7	Al-Gharafa Indoor Hall, Al-Rayyan; Referees: Ossipov, Porol (KAZ)
7 December; 16:00	3× (yellow card) 6× (suspension)		3× (yellow card) 7× (suspension)	Al-Gharafa Indoor Hall, Al-Rayyan; Referees: Ossipov, Porol (KAZ)

8 December; 14:00	Kuwait	32–28	Bahrain	Al-Gharafa Indoor Hall, Al-Rayyan; Referees: Hirzallah, Al-Shoubaki (JOR)
8 December; 14:00	Al-Azemi, Murad 7	(20–10)	J. Abdulqader, Al-Mosawi 6	Al-Gharafa Indoor Hall, Al-Rayyan; Referees: Hirzallah, Al-Shoubaki (JOR)
8 December; 14:00	2× (yellow card) 8× (suspension)		4× (yellow card) 8× (suspension) 2× (red card)	Al-Gharafa Indoor Hall, Al-Rayyan; Referees: Hirzallah, Al-Shoubaki (JOR)

8 December; 16:00	South Korea	26–26	Japan	Al-Gharafa Indoor Hall, Al-Rayyan; Referees: Tanji, Samha (SYR)
8 December; 16:00	Paek 8	(13–14)	Toyoda 7	Al-Gharafa Indoor Hall, Al-Rayyan; Referees: Tanji, Samha (SYR)
8 December; 16:00	1× (yellow card) 7× (suspension)		3× (yellow card) 1× (suspension)	Al-Gharafa Indoor Hall, Al-Rayyan; Referees: Tanji, Samha (SYR)

9 December; 14:00	Kuwait	32–26	South Korea	Al-Gharafa Indoor Hall, Al-Rayyan; Referees: Al-Hail, Al-Hamad (QAT)
9 December; 14:00	Murad 13	(15–10)	Lee T. 9	Al-Gharafa Indoor Hall, Al-Rayyan; Referees: Al-Hail, Al-Hamad (QAT)
9 December; 14:00	3× (yellow card) 5× (suspension)		3× (yellow card) 6× (suspension) 2× (red card)	Al-Gharafa Indoor Hall, Al-Rayyan; Referees: Al-Hail, Al-Hamad (QAT)

9 December; 16:00	Japan	25–24	Bahrain	Al-Gharafa Indoor Hall, Al-Rayyan; Referees: Al-Qarni, Al-Dossary (KSA)
9 December; 16:00	Higashi 5	(13–10)	Malalla 6	Al-Gharafa Indoor Hall, Al-Rayyan; Referees: Al-Qarni, Al-Dossary (KSA)
9 December; 16:00	4× (yellow card) 8× (suspension) 1× (red card)		3× (yellow card) 3× (suspension)	Al-Gharafa Indoor Hall, Al-Rayyan; Referees: Al-Qarni, Al-Dossary (KSA)

=== Placement 5–8 ===
==== Placement 7–8 ====
12 December; 16:00	Bahrain	32–31	Saudi Arabia	Al-Gharafa Indoor Hall, Al-Rayyan; Referees: Kim, Kim (KOR)
12 December; 16:00	J. Abdulqader 8	(18–18)	Al-Saihati 8	Al-Gharafa Indoor Hall, Al-Rayyan; Referees: Kim, Kim (KOR)
12 December; 16:00	2× (yellow card) 4× (suspension)		3× (yellow card) 3× (suspension)	Al-Gharafa Indoor Hall, Al-Rayyan; Referees: Kim, Kim (KOR)

==== Placement 5–6 ====
13 December; 14:00	Japan	31–34	Syria	Al-Gharafa Indoor Hall, Al-Rayyan; Referees: Dib, Haidar (LIB)
13 December; 14:00	Kadoyama 8	(15–16)	Al-Rayes 8	Al-Gharafa Indoor Hall, Al-Rayyan; Referees: Dib, Haidar (LIB)
13 December; 14:00	3× (yellow card) 5× (suspension)		3× (yellow card) 2× (suspension)	Al-Gharafa Indoor Hall, Al-Rayyan; Referees: Dib, Haidar (LIB)

=== Final round ===
Semifinals
11 December
Kuwait	31
Iran	22
11 December
Qatar	40
South Korea	28

Gold medal match
14 December
Kuwait	27
Qatar	24
Bronze medal match
14 December
Iran	31
South Korea	27

==== Semifinals ====
11 December; 18:00	Kuwait	31–22	Iran	Al-Gharafa Indoor Hall, Al-Rayyan; Referees: Hirzallah, Al-Shoubaki (JOR)
11 December; 18:00	Murad 8	(16–10)	Zamani 7	Al-Gharafa Indoor Hall, Al-Rayyan; Referees: Hirzallah, Al-Shoubaki (JOR)
11 December; 18:00	3× (yellow card) 2× (suspension)		3× (yellow card) 3× (suspension)	Al-Gharafa Indoor Hall, Al-Rayyan; Referees: Hirzallah, Al-Shoubaki (JOR)

11 December; 20:00	Qatar	40–28	South Korea	Al-Gharafa Indoor Hall, Al-Rayyan; Referees: Abdulhusain, Khalaf (KUW)
11 December; 20:00	Ah. Al-Saad 8	(19–13)	Lee J.H. 9	Al-Gharafa Indoor Hall, Al-Rayyan; Referees: Abdulhusain, Khalaf (KUW)
11 December; 20:00	3× (yellow card) 3× (suspension)		3× (yellow card) 10× (suspension) 2× (red card)	Al-Gharafa Indoor Hall, Al-Rayyan; Referees: Abdulhusain, Khalaf (KUW)

==== Bronze medal match ====
14 December; 16:00	Iran	31–27	South Korea	Al-Gharafa Indoor Hall, Al-Rayyan; Referees: Ossipov, Porol (KAZ)
14 December; 16:00	Zamani 10	(14–11)	Lee T. 9	Al-Gharafa Indoor Hall, Al-Rayyan; Referees: Ossipov, Porol (KAZ)
14 December; 16:00	3× (yellow card) 9× (suspension) 1× (red card)		4× (yellow card) 7× (suspension)	Al-Gharafa Indoor Hall, Al-Rayyan; Referees: Ossipov, Porol (KAZ)

==== Gold medal match ====
14 December; 18:00	Kuwait	27–24	Qatar	Al-Gharafa Indoor Hall, Al-Rayyan; Referees: Karbaschi, Kolahdouzan (IRI)
14 December; 18:00	Swailem 13	(13–11)	Ghazal 5	Al-Gharafa Indoor Hall, Al-Rayyan; Referees: Karbaschi, Kolahdouzan (IRI)
14 December; 18:00	3× (yellow card) 3× (suspension)		4× (yellow card) 9× (suspension) 2× (red card)	Al-Gharafa Indoor Hall, Al-Rayyan; Referees: Karbaschi, Kolahdouzan (IRI)

== Final standing ==
Rank	Team	Pld	W	D	L
1st place, gold medalist(s)	Kuwait	8	8	0	0
2nd place, silver medalist(s)	Qatar	8	7	0	1
3rd place, bronze medalist(s)	Iran	8	5	0	3
4	South Korea	7	3	1	3
5	Syria	6	3	0	3
6	Japan	7	3	1	3
7	Bahrain	7	3	0	4
8	Saudi Arabia	7	3	0	4
9	Lebanon	4	2	0	2
10	United Arab Emirates	5	2	0	3
11	China	5	2	0	3
12	India	5	1	0	4
13	Hong Kong	4	1	0	3
14	Uzbekistan	5	1	0	4
15	Macau	4	0	0	4
