= Handball at the 2010 Asian Games – Men's tournament =

2010 Asian Games event

Men at the 2010 Asian Games
- Venue: Huashi Gymnasium; Guanggong Gymnasium
- Date: 13–26 November 2010
- Competitors: 173 from 11 nations

Medalists
gold medal	South Korea
silver medal	Iran
bronze medal	Japan

The Men's handball at the 2010 Asian Games was held in Guangzhou, Guangdong, China from November 13 to 26, 2010. In this tournament, 11 teams played.

== Squads ==
Athletes from Kuwait	Bahrain	China	Hong Kong
Salman Al-Mezel; Hasan Al-Shatti; Naser Bokhadra; Abdulaziz Al-Zoabi; Faisal Al-Mutairi; Husain Siwan; Naseer Hasan; Husain Al-Shatti; Mahdi Abdulhalim; Mohammad Al-Gharaballi; Salem Abdulsalam; Sameh Al-Hajeri; Torki Al-Khalidi; Abdullah Al-Gharaballi; Meshari Siwan; Saad Al-Haidari	Saeed Jawher; Hasan Madan; Ali Zuhair; Ali Merza; Hasan Al-Fardan; Husain Al-Sayyad; Jaafar Abdulqader; Sadiq Ali; Ahmed Abbas; Salah Abduljalil; Maher Ashoor; Mahmood Al-Wanna; Mohamed Abdulhusain; Jaafar Abbas; Ali Husain Abdulredha; Abbas Malalla	Liu Wei; Yan Liang; Zhao Chen; Zhai Qiankun; Zhou Xiaojian; Zhang Zhiyu; Wang Xudong; Wang Long; Tian Jianxia; Li An; Wang Quan; Du Zaichao; Miao Qing; Pan Xiang; Fu Yunbo; Zhu Xinchen	Yiu Tai Wai; Chan Wan Man; Ho Wai Kit; Leung Chi Sai; Lin Ming Fai; Hui Man Pong; Ip Shi Yan; Tse Wai Hei; Wong Ka Yu; Addy Ip; Ng Yue Kiu; Wong Shing Yip; Cheng Chun Wing; Koon Lap Kei; Leung Hoi Yip; Jia Dongjin
India	Iran	Japan	Mongolia
Raghu Kumar Gurung; Shamsher Singh; Firoz Ahmad Khan; Jain Prasad; Sachin Chaudhary; K. Praseed Kumar; Naya Chandra Singh; Binu Vasu; Sajesh Peringath; Deepak Ahlawat; Neeraj Singh; Navin Kumar Mishra; Greenidge D'Cunha; Manish Kumar; Mohinder Singh Rawat; Amit Kumar	Abbas Asadzadeh; Milad Masaeli; Mohammad Reza Rajabi; Ehsan Abouei; Omid Sekenari; Sajjad Esteki; Masoud Zohrabi; Mostafa Sadati; Allahkaram Esteki; Javad Khorramipour; Erfan Saeidi; Mehrdad Samsami; Jalal Kiani; Saeid Barkhordari; Mohammad Mehdi Asgari; Mehdi Bijari	Katsuyuki Shinouchi; Kenji Toyoda; Makoto Suematsu; Hideyuki Murakami; Daisuke Miyazaki; Toru Takeda; Satoshi Fujita; Hidenori Kishigawa; Morihide Kaido; Toshihiro Tsubone; Kyosuke Tomita; Jun Mori; Masayuki Matsumura; Yoshiaki Nomura; Tetsuya Kadoyama; Shusaku Higashinagahama	Erdenebatyn Tenüün; Altangereliin Zolboo; Sodnomdashiin Ochkhüü; Yuragiin Sainkhüü; Otgonbatyn Tsolmon; Dagvaagiin Enkhtaivan; Onongiin Sandag; Sosorbaramyn Bat-Erdene; Batsaikhany Baatarsüren; Battüvshingiin Mönkhbileg; Dashdelgeriin Tsogtbayar; Sünjidmaagiin Nyamdorj; Duliin Erdene-Ochir
Qatar	Saudi Arabia	South Korea	
Hamad Al-Hajri; Mohammed Walid Ghazal; Wajdi Sinen; Fawaz Al-Moadhadi; Mohsin Yafai; Bassel Al-Rayes; Nasser Jassim Al-Kuwari; Abdulla Ramazan; Yousef Al-Maalem; Bader Al-Ghamdi; Mutasem Mohamed; Ismail Mohammed; Ahmed Morgan; Hamad Madadi; Nawaf Al-Suwaidi; Mubarak Salem	Mohammed Al-Zaer; Yasser Shakhor; Hussain Al-Mohsin; Mustafa Al-Habib; Nabil Al-Obaidi; Sultan Al-Obaidi; Mohammed Al-Salem; Turki Al-Enbaawi; Abdullah Al-Abdulali; Mahdi Al-Salem; Qusai Al-Saeed; Majed Abo-Al-Raha; Ahmed Al-Abdulali; Siraj Al-Zaer; Hussain Al-Hannabi; Yousof Al-Taweel	Lee Chang-woo; Jeong Yi-kyeong; Sim Jae-bok; Park Kyung-suk; Kim Tea-wan; Jung Su-young; Park Jung-geu; Lee Sang-uk; Park Chan-young; Oh Yun-suk; Lee Tea-young; Kang Il-koo; Lee Jae-woo; Yu Dong-geun; Paek Won-chul; Yoon Kyung-shin	

== Results ==
All times are China Standard Time (UTC+08:00)

=== Preliminary round ===
==== Group A ====
Pos	Team	Pld	W	D	L	GF	GA	GD	Pts	Qualification
1	Japan	5	4	0	1	208	123	+85	8	Semifinals
2	Saudi Arabia	5	3	1	1	192	129	+63	7 (Note: Head-to-head result: KSA 32–31 QAT.)	Semifinals
3	Qatar	5	3	1	1	185	134	+51	7	Placement 5th–6th
4	China	5	2	2	1	178	109	+69	6	Placement 7th–8th
5	India	5	1	0	4	153	194	−41	2	Placement 9th–10th
6	Mongolia	5	0	0	5	88	315	−227	0	

Source: Results
Notes:

13 November; 14:00	China	41–21	India	Huashi Gymnasium, Guangzhou; Referees: Al-Marzouqi, Al-Nuaimi (UAE)
13 November; 14:00	Liu, Zhou, Zhang 5	(19–12)	Prasad 6	Huashi Gymnasium, Guangzhou; Referees: Al-Marzouqi, Al-Nuaimi (UAE)
13 November; 14:00	2× (yellow card) 4× (suspension) 1× (red card)		2× (yellow card) 5× (suspension) 1× (red card)	Huashi Gymnasium, Guangzhou; Referees: Al-Marzouqi, Al-Nuaimi (UAE)

13 November; 15:45	Japan	27–33	Qatar	Huashi Gymnasium, Guangzhou; Referees: Karbaschi, Kolahdouzan (IRI)
13 November; 15:45	Miyazaki 10	(17–17)	Al-Rayes 13	Huashi Gymnasium, Guangzhou; Referees: Karbaschi, Kolahdouzan (IRI)
13 November; 15:45	3× (yellow card) 5× (suspension)		3× (yellow card) 9× (suspension) 1× (red card)	Huashi Gymnasium, Guangzhou; Referees: Karbaschi, Kolahdouzan (IRI)

13 November; 17:30	Mongolia	17–69	Saudi Arabia	Huashi Gymnasium, Guangzhou; Referees: Mousavian, Taghavi (IRI)
13 November; 17:30	Ochkhüü 6	(11–31)	S. Al-Zaer, Al-Taweel 9	Huashi Gymnasium, Guangzhou; Referees: Mousavian, Taghavi (IRI)
13 November; 17:30	2× (yellow card) 7× (suspension) 1× (red card)		2× (yellow card)	Huashi Gymnasium, Guangzhou; Referees: Mousavian, Taghavi (IRI)

14 November; 14:00	Saudi Arabia	23–23	China	Huashi Gymnasium, Guangzhou; Referees: Al-Abdullah, Hirzallah (JOR)
14 November; 14:00	Al-Mohsin 7	(10–10)	Zhu 9	Huashi Gymnasium, Guangzhou; Referees: Al-Abdullah, Hirzallah (JOR)
14 November; 14:00	2× (yellow card) 5× (suspension)		2× (yellow card) 2× (suspension)	Huashi Gymnasium, Guangzhou; Referees: Al-Abdullah, Hirzallah (JOR)

14 November; 15:45	India	28–37	Qatar	Huashi Gymnasium, Guangzhou; Referees: Al-Mizili, Al-Mawlani (BHR)
14 November; 15:45	N. Singh 9	(8–17)	Al-Rayes 9	Huashi Gymnasium, Guangzhou; Referees: Al-Mizili, Al-Mawlani (BHR)
14 November; 15:45	1× (yellow card) 5× (suspension) 1× (red card)		3× (yellow card) 4× (suspension) 1× (red card)	Huashi Gymnasium, Guangzhou; Referees: Al-Mizili, Al-Mawlani (BHR)

14 November; 17:30	Mongolia	14–64	Japan	Huashi Gymnasium, Guangzhou; Referees: Liu, Liu (CHN)
14 November; 17:30	Sainkhüü 4	(10–28)	Miyazaki 9	Huashi Gymnasium, Guangzhou; Referees: Liu, Liu (CHN)
14 November; 17:30	3× (yellow card) 3× (suspension)		3× (yellow card) 1× (suspension)	Huashi Gymnasium, Guangzhou; Referees: Liu, Liu (CHN)

16 November; 14:00	Qatar	59–22	Mongolia	Huashi Gymnasium, Guangzhou; Referees: Liu, Chang (TPE)
16 November; 14:00	Sinen 10	(28–11)	Baatarsüren 7	Huashi Gymnasium, Guangzhou; Referees: Liu, Chang (TPE)
16 November; 14:00	3× (yellow card)		3× (yellow card) 3× (suspension)	Huashi Gymnasium, Guangzhou; Referees: Liu, Chang (TPE)

16 November; 15:45	China	22–27	Japan	Huashi Gymnasium, Guangzhou; Referees: Al-Mutawa, Al-Suwailam (KUW)
16 November; 15:45	Tian 6	(10–12)	Toyoda 6	Huashi Gymnasium, Guangzhou; Referees: Al-Mutawa, Al-Suwailam (KUW)
16 November; 15:45	3× (yellow card) 4× (suspension)		3× (yellow card) 2× (suspension)	Huashi Gymnasium, Guangzhou; Referees: Al-Mutawa, Al-Suwailam (KUW)

16 November; 17:30	Saudi Arabia	40–22	India	Huashi Gymnasium, Guangzhou; Referees: Ossipov, Porol (KAZ)
16 November; 17:30	M. Al-Zaer, Al-Enbaawi, Ma. Al-Salem 6	(18–10)	N. Singh 7	Huashi Gymnasium, Guangzhou; Referees: Ossipov, Porol (KAZ)
16 November; 17:30	3× (yellow card) 6× (suspension)		1× (yellow card) 5× (suspension)	Huashi Gymnasium, Guangzhou; Referees: Ossipov, Porol (KAZ)

18 November; 14:00	Qatar	31–32	Saudi Arabia	Huashi Gymnasium, Guangzhou; Referees: Al-Marzouqi, Al-Nuaimi (UAE)
18 November; 14:00	Sinen 9	(15–16)	Al-Mohsin 9	Huashi Gymnasium, Guangzhou; Referees: Al-Marzouqi, Al-Nuaimi (UAE)
18 November; 14:00	3× (yellow card) 10× (suspension) 1× (red card)		3× (yellow card) 6× (suspension) 2× (red card)	Huashi Gymnasium, Guangzhou; Referees: Al-Marzouqi, Al-Nuaimi (UAE)

18 November; 15:45	China	67–13	Mongolia	Huashi Gymnasium, Guangzhou; Referees: Al-Mutawa, Al-Suwailam (KUW)
18 November; 15:45	Li 20	(34–4)	Sainkhüü 4	Huashi Gymnasium, Guangzhou; Referees: Al-Mutawa, Al-Suwailam (KUW)
18 November; 15:45	1× (yellow card) 2× (suspension)		3× (yellow card) 3× (suspension)	Huashi Gymnasium, Guangzhou; Referees: Al-Mutawa, Al-Suwailam (KUW)

18 November; 17:30	Japan	54–26	India	Huashi Gymnasium, Guangzhou; Referees: Mousavian, Taghavi (IRI)
18 November; 17:30	Miyazaki 8	(26–13)	Prasad 10	Huashi Gymnasium, Guangzhou; Referees: Mousavian, Taghavi (IRI)
18 November; 17:30	3× (yellow card) 3× (suspension)		2× (yellow card) 3× (suspension)	Huashi Gymnasium, Guangzhou; Referees: Mousavian, Taghavi (IRI)

20 November; 14:00	India	56–22	Mongolia	Huashi Gymnasium, Guangzhou; Referees: Liu, Liu (CHN)
20 November; 14:00	N. Singh 16	(20–8)	Baatarsüren 6	Huashi Gymnasium, Guangzhou; Referees: Liu, Liu (CHN)
20 November; 14:00	3× (yellow card) 2× (suspension) 1× (red card)		3× (yellow card) 4× (suspension) 1× (red card)	Huashi Gymnasium, Guangzhou; Referees: Liu, Liu (CHN)

20 November; 15:45	Japan	36–28	Saudi Arabia	Huashi Gymnasium, Guangzhou; Referees: Ossipov, Porol (KAZ)
20 November; 15:45	Kadoyama 7	(16–14)	Al-Habib 9	Huashi Gymnasium, Guangzhou; Referees: Ossipov, Porol (KAZ)
20 November; 15:45	1× (yellow card) 2× (suspension)		2× (yellow card) 5× (suspension) 1× (red card)	Huashi Gymnasium, Guangzhou; Referees: Ossipov, Porol (KAZ)

20 November; 17:30	Qatar	25–25	China	Huashi Gymnasium, Guangzhou; Referees: Al-Abdullah, Hirzallah (JOR)
20 November; 17:30	Ghazal, Al-Rayes 5	(14–10)	Li 8	Huashi Gymnasium, Guangzhou; Referees: Al-Abdullah, Hirzallah (JOR)
20 November; 17:30	3× (yellow card) 4× (suspension)		3× (yellow card) 4× (suspension)	Huashi Gymnasium, Guangzhou; Referees: Al-Abdullah, Hirzallah (JOR)

==== Group B ====
Pos	Team	Pld	W	D	L	GF	GA	GD	Pts	Qualification
1	South Korea	4	4	0	0	149	98	+51	8	Semifinals
2	Iran	4	3	0	1	127	95	+32	6	Semifinals
3	Bahrain	4	2	0	2	118	111	+7	4	Placement 5th–6th
4	Athletes from Kuwait	4	1	0	3	126	111	+15	2	Placement 7th–8th
5	Hong Kong	4	0	0	4	67	172	−105	0	Placement 9th–10th

Source: Results

13 November; 14:00	Athletes from Kuwait	25–27	Bahrain	Guanggong Gymnasium, Guangzhou; Referees: Ossipov, Porol (KAZ)
13 November; 14:00	M. Al-Gharaballi 8	(14–13)	Al-Wanna 7	Guanggong Gymnasium, Guangzhou; Referees: Ossipov, Porol (KAZ)
13 November; 14:00	3× (yellow card) 5× (suspension)		1× (yellow card) 6× (suspension) 2× (red card)	Guanggong Gymnasium, Guangzhou; Referees: Ossipov, Porol (KAZ)

13 November; 15:45	South Korea	52–13	Hong Kong	Guanggong Gymnasium, Guangzhou; Referees: Liu, Chang (TPE)
13 November; 15:45	Jeong, Kim 7	(22–5)	Lin 4	Guanggong Gymnasium, Guangzhou; Referees: Liu, Chang (TPE)
13 November; 15:45	1× (yellow card)		2× (yellow card) 1× (suspension)	Guanggong Gymnasium, Guangzhou; Referees: Liu, Chang (TPE)

14 November; 14:00	Iran	35–13	Hong Kong	Guanggong Gymnasium, Guangzhou; Referees: Fukushima, Ienaga (JPN)
14 November; 14:00	four players 5	(15–7)	Yiu, Hui, Ip S. 2	Guanggong Gymnasium, Guangzhou; Referees: Fukushima, Ienaga (JPN)
14 November; 14:00	2× (yellow card)		1× (yellow card) 3× (suspension)	Guanggong Gymnasium, Guangzhou; Referees: Fukushima, Ienaga (JPN)

14 November; 15:45	South Korea	35–27	Bahrain	Guanggong Gymnasium, Guangzhou; Referees: Hizaki, Ikebuchi (JPN)
14 November; 15:45	Park J. 8	(19–11)	Abdulqader 9	Guanggong Gymnasium, Guangzhou; Referees: Hizaki, Ikebuchi (JPN)
14 November; 15:45	3× (yellow card) 2× (suspension)		3× (yellow card) 2× (suspension) 1× (red card)	Guanggong Gymnasium, Guangzhou; Referees: Hizaki, Ikebuchi (JPN)

16 November; 14:00	Athletes from Kuwait	29–31	South Korea	Guanggong Gymnasium, Guangzhou; Referees: Al-Marzouqi, Al-Nuaimi (UAE)
16 November; 14:00	Al-Hajeri 8	(12–19)	Jeong 7	Guanggong Gymnasium, Guangzhou; Referees: Al-Marzouqi, Al-Nuaimi (UAE)
16 November; 14:00	3× (yellow card) 4× (suspension)		1× (yellow card) 4× (suspension)	Guanggong Gymnasium, Guangzhou; Referees: Al-Marzouqi, Al-Nuaimi (UAE)

16 November; 15:45	Iran	31–24	Bahrain	Guanggong Gymnasium, Guangzhou; Referees: Li, Wang (CHN)
16 November; 15:45	A. Esteki 11	(15–10)	Jawher 8	Guanggong Gymnasium, Guangzhou; Referees: Li, Wang (CHN)
16 November; 15:45	3× (yellow card) 2× (suspension)		4× (yellow card) 6× (suspension) 1× (red card)	Guanggong Gymnasium, Guangzhou; Referees: Li, Wang (CHN)

17 November; 14:00	Athletes from Kuwait	45–21	Hong Kong	Guanggong Gymnasium, Guangzhou; Referees: Fukushima, Ienaga (JPN)
17 November; 14:00	Hasan, Al-Haidari 7	(25–9)	Ip S. 7	Guanggong Gymnasium, Guangzhou; Referees: Fukushima, Ienaga (JPN)
17 November; 14:00	2× (yellow card) 1× (suspension)		3× (yellow card) 2× (suspension)	Guanggong Gymnasium, Guangzhou; Referees: Fukushima, Ienaga (JPN)

17 November; 15:45	Iran	29–31	South Korea	Guanggong Gymnasium, Guangzhou; Referees: Hizaki, Ikebuchi (JPN)
17 November; 15:45	S. Esteki 8	(13–21)	Jeong 9	Guanggong Gymnasium, Guangzhou; Referees: Hizaki, Ikebuchi (JPN)
17 November; 15:45	3× (yellow card) 3× (suspension)		3× (yellow card) 4× (suspension)	Guanggong Gymnasium, Guangzhou; Referees: Hizaki, Ikebuchi (JPN)

19 November; 14:00	Bahrain	40–20	Hong Kong	Guanggong Gymnasium, Guangzhou; Referees: Hizaki, Ikebuchi (JPN)
19 November; 14:00	Al-Wanna 8	(18–9)	Hui 5	Guanggong Gymnasium, Guangzhou; Referees: Hizaki, Ikebuchi (JPN)
19 November; 14:00	2× (yellow card) 1× (suspension)		2× (yellow card) 2× (suspension)	Guanggong Gymnasium, Guangzhou; Referees: Hizaki, Ikebuchi (JPN)

19 November; 15:45	Athletes from Kuwait	27–32	Iran	Guanggong Gymnasium, Guangzhou; Referees: Al-Abdullah, Hirzallah (JOR)
19 November; 15:45	Al-Mutairi 7	(11–16)	Rajabi, Bijari 7	Guanggong Gymnasium, Guangzhou; Referees: Al-Abdullah, Hirzallah (JOR)
19 November; 15:45	5× (yellow card) 2× (suspension)		3× (yellow card) 2× (suspension)	Guanggong Gymnasium, Guangzhou; Referees: Al-Abdullah, Hirzallah (JOR)

=== Placement 5th–10th ===
==== Placement 9th–10th ====
22 November; 18:00	India	34–29	Hong Kong	Huashi Gymnasium, Guangzhou; Referees: Chang, Liu (TPE)
22 November; 18:00	N. Singh 13	(17–16)	Ip S. 7	Huashi Gymnasium, Guangzhou; Referees: Chang, Liu (TPE)
22 November; 18:00	1× (yellow card) 4× (suspension)		3× (yellow card) 7× (suspension)	Huashi Gymnasium, Guangzhou; Referees: Chang, Liu (TPE)

==== Placement 7th–8th ====
24 November; 18:00	China	33–30	Athletes from Kuwait	Huashi Gymnasium, Guangzhou; Referees: Mousavian, Taghavi (IRI)
24 November; 18:00	Tian 8	(18–16)	Al-Zoabi 15	Huashi Gymnasium, Guangzhou; Referees: Mousavian, Taghavi (IRI)
24 November; 18:00	2× (yellow card) 6× (suspension) 1× (red card)		3× (yellow card) 2× (suspension)	Huashi Gymnasium, Guangzhou; Referees: Mousavian, Taghavi (IRI)

==== Placement 5th–6th ====
24 November; 20:15	Qatar	28–26	Bahrain	Huashi Gymnasium, Guangzhou; Referees: Hizaki, Ikebuchi (JPN)
24 November; 20:15	Al-Ghamdi 7	(10–14)	A. Abbas 6	Huashi Gymnasium, Guangzhou; Referees: Hizaki, Ikebuchi (JPN)
24 November; 20:15	4× (yellow card) 7× (suspension)		3× (yellow card) 2× (suspension)	Huashi Gymnasium, Guangzhou; Referees: Hizaki, Ikebuchi (JPN)

=== Final round ===
Semifinals
23 November
Japan	29
Iran	30
23 November
South Korea	41
Saudi Arabia	19

Gold medal match
26 November
Iran	28
South Korea	32
Bronze medal match
26 November
Japan	27
Saudi Arabia	20

==== Semifinals ====
23 November; 18:00	Japan	29–30	Iran	Huashi Gymnasium, Guangzhou; Referees: Al-Mutawa, Al-Suwailam (KUW)
23 November; 18:00	Toyoda 7	(16–15)	A. Esteki 6	Huashi Gymnasium, Guangzhou; Referees: Al-Mutawa, Al-Suwailam (KUW)
23 November; 18:00	3× (yellow card) 2× (suspension)		3× (yellow card) 5× (suspension)	Huashi Gymnasium, Guangzhou; Referees: Al-Mutawa, Al-Suwailam (KUW)

23 November; 20:15	South Korea	41–19	Saudi Arabia	Huashi Gymnasium, Guangzhou; Referees: Al-Marzouqi, Al-Nuaimi (UAE)
23 November; 20:15	Park J., Lee T. 6	(19–11)	four players 3	Huashi Gymnasium, Guangzhou; Referees: Al-Marzouqi, Al-Nuaimi (UAE)
23 November; 20:15	3× (yellow card) 1× (suspension)		3× (yellow card) 4× (suspension) 1× (red card)	Huashi Gymnasium, Guangzhou; Referees: Al-Marzouqi, Al-Nuaimi (UAE)

==== Bronze medal match ====
26 November; 18:00	Japan	27–20	Saudi Arabia	Huashi Gymnasium, Guangzhou; Referees: Al-Mizili, Al-Mawlani (BHR)
26 November; 18:00	Toyoda 8	(13–10)	Al-Mohsin, Al-Enbaawi 4	Huashi Gymnasium, Guangzhou; Referees: Al-Mizili, Al-Mawlani (BHR)
26 November; 18:00	3× (yellow card) 2× (suspension) 2× (red card)		3× (yellow card) 8× (suspension)	Huashi Gymnasium, Guangzhou; Referees: Al-Mizili, Al-Mawlani (BHR)

==== Gold medal match ====
26 November; 20:15	Iran	28–32	South Korea	Huashi Gymnasium, Guangzhou; Referees: Al-Mutawa, Al-Suwailam (KUW)
26 November; 20:15	A. Esteki 9	(9–16)	Lee T. 9	Huashi Gymnasium, Guangzhou; Referees: Al-Mutawa, Al-Suwailam (KUW)
26 November; 20:15	3× (yellow card) 2× (suspension)		2× (yellow card) 5× (suspension)	Huashi Gymnasium, Guangzhou; Referees: Al-Mutawa, Al-Suwailam (KUW)

== Final standing ==
Rank	Team	Pld	W	D	L
1st place, gold medalist(s)	South Korea	6	6	0	0
2nd place, silver medalist(s)	Iran	6	4	0	2
3rd place, bronze medalist(s)	Japan	7	5	0	2
4	Saudi Arabia	7	3	1	3
5	Qatar	6	4	1	1
6	Bahrain	5	2	0	3
7	China	6	3	2	1
8	Athletes from Kuwait	5	1	0	4
9	India	6	2	0	4
10	Hong Kong	5	0	0	5
11	Mongolia	5	0	0	5
