= Handball at the 2002 Asian Games – Men's tournament =

Men at the 2002 Asian Games
- Venue: Changwon Gymnasium
- Date: 30 September – 13 October 2002
- Competitors: 135 from 9 nations

Medalists
gold medal	South Korea
silver medal	Kuwait
bronze medal	Qatar

Men's handball at the 2002 Asian Games was held in Changwon Gymnasium, Changwon from September 30 to October 13, 2002.

== Squads ==
Bahrain	China	Chinese Taipei	Japan
Saeed Jawher; Jaafar Abdulqader; Fahad Jasim; Ahmed Abdulnabi; Ahmed Tarrada; Mahmood Abdulqader; Hasan Al-Nasheet; Ali Abdulhadi; Mohamed Abdulnabi; Maher Ashoor; Husain Maki; Mohamed Ahmed; Khaled Abbas; Abdulrahman Mohamed; Ahmed Al-Tajer; Yusuf Husain	Ye Qiang; Zhu Jie; Liu Lifu; Fang Ming; Shang Xi; Du Changyi; Cui Lei; Zhu Wenxin; Cui Liang; Ding Zhigang; Sun Zhifeng; Wang Bin; Zhang Ji	Tsao Shih-chang; Liu Tung-tsai; Kao Erh-heng; Cheng Yuen-tsung; Cheng Shun-lung; Wang Cheng-chieh; Su Ta-chih; Lee Chang-hung; Chang Yung-chang; Kao Yu-po; Pan Chien-hung; Chen Yu-jen; Wang Chih-chung; Yeh Kuo-hui; Tan Tsung-sheng; Lee Hsin-liang	Toshihiro Tsubone; Katsuaki Matsubayashi; Takeshi Uchida; Norihiro Sasaki; Yuji Kakutani; Kenji Ikebe; Daisuke Miyazaki; Masayoshi Shimokawa; Hideaki Nagashima; Masayuki Furuie; Yoshio Nakagawa; Atsushi Shikata; Taichi Haga; Kiyoshi Kayaba; Osamu Yamaguchi; Yuya Taba
Kuwait	Mongolia	Qatar	South Korea
Abdulrazzaq Al-Boloushi; Hasan Al-Shatti; Fahad Al-Azemi; Waleed Al-Hajraf; Husain Siwan; Ali Al-Haddad; Ahmad Al-Kandari; Abdullah Al-Theyab; Yousef Al-Fadhli; Salah Al-Marzouq; Abdulaziz Balous; Meshal Swailem; Mohammad Al-Fadhli; Saad Al-Azemi; Ali Murad; Faisal Siwan	Kherlenbayaryn Ölziidoo; Batsükhiin Dorjpalam; Tümenjargalyn Batnasan; Batduulgyn Namsraijav; Uuganbaataryn Sambuu; Bayarsaikhany Badarch; Otgonbatyn Tsolmon; Dashgaldany Pürevkhand; Enkhbaataryn Byambajav; Enkhbaataryn Bayaraa	Nawaf Al-Suwaidi; Mohamed Saad Al-Saad; Rashid Al-Remaihi; Mohammed Al-Mansoori; Abdulla Saad Al-Saad; Adnan Al-Ali; Khalid Al-Sabea; Ahmed Saad Al-Saad; Mubarak Bilal Al-Ali; Yousef Ashoor; Nasser Saad Al-Saad; Mahmoud Ali Shayef; Badi Johar; Yousef Al-Maalem; Borhan Al-Turki; Meshaal Al-Sulaiti	Han Kyung-tai; Hwangbo Sung-il; Kim Tea-wan; Yoon Kyung-min; Jeong Seo-yoon; Lim Seong-sik; Chang Joon-sung; Nam Kwang-hyun; Yoon Kyung-shin; Park Min-chul; Lee Jun-hee; Kang Il-koo; Lee Jae-woo; Park Jung-jin; Lee Byung-ho; Paek Won-chul
United Arab Emirates			
Abdulrahman Al-Nuaimi; Saqer Obaid; Hamad Khalfan; Ali Saqer; Yousuf Mohamed Ahli; Adam Al-Nuaimi; Ahmed Saqer; Abdulla Al-Saffar; Khalid Ahmed Al-Balooshi; Ahmed Bin Suroor; Omar Al-Khani; Nasser Yousuf; Jasim Al-Ali; Juma Al-Kaabi; Mohamed Hassan Al-Balooshi; Ahmed Mohamed Ahli			

== Results ==
All times are Korea Standard Time (UTC+09:00)

=== Preliminary ===
==== Group A ====
Pos	Team	Pld	W	D	L	GF	GA	GD	Pts	Qualification
1	South Korea	4	4	0	0	145	65	+80	8	Semifinals
2	Japan	4	3	0	1	134	69	+65	6	Semifinals
3	Bahrain	4	2	0	2	135	92	+43	4	Classification 5th–6th
4	China	4	1	0	3	116	111	+5	2	Classification 7th–8th
5	Mongolia	4	0	0	4	34	227	−193	0	

Source: AHF

30 September; 15:00	South Korea	59–7	Mongolia	Changwon Gymnasium, Changwon; Referees: Zhang, Wang (CHN)
30 September; 15:00	Lee J.H. 11	(33–2)	Ölziidoo 2	Changwon Gymnasium, Changwon; Referees: Zhang, Wang (CHN)

30 September; 17:00	Japan	30–15	China	Changwon Gymnasium, Changwon; Referees: Kouzehgari, Hayatpour (IRI)
30 September; 17:00	Miyazaki, Nakagawa, Kayaba 6	(14–8)	Zhu W. 7	Changwon Gymnasium, Changwon; Referees: Kouzehgari, Hayatpour (IRI)

2 October; 15:00	South Korea	37–20	China	Changwon Gymnasium, Changwon; Referees: Al-Busaidi, Darwish (OMA)
2 October; 15:00	Paek 8	(16–11)	Zhu W. 7	Changwon Gymnasium, Changwon; Referees: Al-Busaidi, Darwish (OMA)

2 October; 17:00	Japan	35–24	Bahrain	Changwon Gymnasium, Changwon; Referees: Kouzehgari, Hayatpour (IRI)
2 October; 17:00	Miyazaki 10	(17–11)	Jawher 11	Changwon Gymnasium, Changwon; Referees: Kouzehgari, Hayatpour (IRI)

4 October; 15:00	Japan	52–6	Mongolia	Changwon Gymnasium, Changwon; Referees: Choi, Lim (KOR)
4 October; 15:00	Kakutani, Shimokawa 8	(26–3)	Dorjpalam 2	Changwon Gymnasium, Changwon; Referees: Choi, Lim (KOR)

4 October; 17:00	China	27–28	Bahrain	Changwon Gymnasium, Changwon; Referees: Al-Dossary, Al-Qarni (KSA)
4 October; 17:00	Zhu W. 12	(12–14)	J. Abdulqader 7	Changwon Gymnasium, Changwon; Referees: Al-Dossary, Al-Qarni (KSA)

6 October; 15:00	South Korea	25–21	Bahrain	Changwon Gymnasium, Changwon; Referees: Al-Mulla, Al-Zarraa (QAT)
6 October; 15:00		(13–11)		Changwon Gymnasium, Changwon; Referees: Al-Mulla, Al-Zarraa (QAT)

6 October; 17:00	China	54–16	Mongolia	Changwon Gymnasium, Changwon; Referees: Lim, Kang (KOR)
6 October; 17:00		(26–3)		Changwon Gymnasium, Changwon; Referees: Lim, Kang (KOR)

8 October; 15:00	South Korea	24–17	Japan	Changwon Gymnasium, Changwon; Referees: Abbas, Haider (KUW)
8 October; 15:00	Yoon K.S. 7	(10–7)	Nakagawa 7	Changwon Gymnasium, Changwon; Referees: Abbas, Haider (KUW)

8 October; 17:00	Bahrain	62–5	Mongolia	Changwon Gymnasium, Changwon; Referees: Hamada, Ogasawara (JPN)
8 October; 17:00	M. Abdulqader 21	(37–5)	Batnasan 2	Changwon Gymnasium, Changwon; Referees: Hamada, Ogasawara (JPN)

==== Group B ====
Pos	Team	Pld	W	D	L	GF	GA	GD	Pts	Qualification
1	Kuwait	3	2	1	0	86	81	+5	5	Semifinals
2	Qatar	3	2	0	1	90	77	+13	4	Semifinals
3	Chinese Taipei	3	1	0	2	86	92	−6	2	Classification 5th–6th
4	United Arab Emirates	3	0	1	2	74	86	−12	1	Classification 7th–8th

Source: AHF

1 October; 17:00	Kuwait	28–26	Qatar	Changwon Gymnasium, Changwon; Referees: Al-Dossary, Al-Qarni (KSA)
1 October; 17:00	Murad 7	(18–12)	Al-Suwaidi 6	Changwon Gymnasium, Changwon; Referees: Al-Dossary, Al-Qarni (KSA)

3 October; 17:00	United Arab Emirates	26–30	Chinese Taipei	Changwon Gymnasium, Changwon; Referees: Lim, Kang (KOR)
3 October; 17:00	Al-Saffar 8	(13–15)	Tan 9	Changwon Gymnasium, Changwon; Referees: Lim, Kang (KOR)

5 October; 17:00	Kuwait	32–29	Chinese Taipei	Changwon Gymnasium, Changwon; Referees: Al-Busaidi, Darwish (OMA)
5 October; 17:00	Siwan 9	(15–14)	Lee C. 7	Changwon Gymnasium, Changwon; Referees: Al-Busaidi, Darwish (OMA)

7 October; 17:00	United Arab Emirates	22–30	Qatar	Changwon Gymnasium, Changwon; Referees: Lim, Kang (KOR)
7 October; 17:00	Al-Saffar 7	(13–15)	Ah. Al-Saad 8	Changwon Gymnasium, Changwon; Referees: Lim, Kang (KOR)

9 October; 15:00	Kuwait	26–26	United Arab Emirates	Changwon Gymnasium, Changwon; Referees: Al-Dossary, Al-Qarni (KSA)
9 October; 15:00	Al-Hajraf, S. Al-Azemi 5	(13–14)	Al-Saffar, Al-Ali 5	Changwon Gymnasium, Changwon; Referees: Al-Dossary, Al-Qarni (KSA)

9 October; 17:00	Qatar	34–27	Chinese Taipei	Changwon Gymnasium, Changwon; Referees: Kouzehgari, Hayatpour (IRI)
9 October; 17:00	Ah. Al-Saad 11	(18–12)	Tan 7	Changwon Gymnasium, Changwon; Referees: Kouzehgari, Hayatpour (IRI)

=== Classification 5th–8th ===
==== Classification 7th–8th ====
12 October; 16:00	China	33–27	United Arab Emirates	Changwon Gymnasium, Changwon; Referees: Choi, Lim (KOR)
12 October; 16:00	Zhu W. 15	(18–10)	Ah. Saqer 9	Changwon Gymnasium, Changwon; Referees: Choi, Lim (KOR)

==== Classification 5th–6th ====
12 October
18:00
Bahrain
33–35 (ET)
Chinese Taipei
Changwon Gymnasium, Changwon
Referees: Zhang, Wang (CHN)
J. Abdulqader, M. Abdulqader 7
(9–14)
Tan 9

FT: 27–27 ET: 6–8

=== Final round ===
Semifinals
11 October
South Korea	31
Qatar	30
11 October
Kuwait	27
Japan	24

Final 1st–2nd
13 October
South Korea	22
Kuwait	21
Final 3rd–4th
13 October
Qatar	28
Japan	21

==== Semifinals ====
11 October; 16:00	South Korea	31–30	Qatar	Changwon Gymnasium, Changwon; Referees: Al-Dossary, Al-Qarni (KSA)
11 October; 16:00	Paek 16	(16–14)	Al-Turki 9	Changwon Gymnasium, Changwon; Referees: Al-Dossary, Al-Qarni (KSA)

11 October; 18:00	Kuwait	27–24	Japan	Changwon Gymnasium, Changwon; Referees: Al-Busaidi, Darwish (OMA)
11 October; 18:00	Murad 8	(14–12)	Sasaki, Taba 5	Changwon Gymnasium, Changwon; Referees: Al-Busaidi, Darwish (OMA)

==== Final 3rd–4th ====
13 October; 16:00	Qatar	28–21	Japan	Changwon Gymnasium, Changwon; Referees: Abbas, Haider (KUW)
13 October; 16:00	Ab. Al-Saad 7	(14–7)	Kayaba 7	Changwon Gymnasium, Changwon; Referees: Abbas, Haider (KUW)

==== Final 1st–2nd ====
13 October; 18:00	South Korea	22–21	Kuwait	Changwon Gymnasium, Changwon; Referees: Kouzehgari, Hayatpour (IRI)
13 October; 18:00	Yoon K.S., Paek 5	(13–11)		Changwon Gymnasium, Changwon; Referees: Kouzehgari, Hayatpour (IRI)

== Final standing ==
Rank	Team	Pld	W	D	L
1st place, gold medalist(s)	South Korea	6	6	0	0
2nd place, silver medalist(s)	Kuwait	5	3	1	1
3rd place, bronze medalist(s)	Qatar	5	3	0	2
4	Japan	6	3	0	3
5	Chinese Taipei	4	2	0	2
6	Bahrain	5	2	0	3
7	China	5	2	0	3
8	United Arab Emirates	4	0	1	3
9	Mongolia	4	0	0	4
