= 2012 Asian Men's Handball Championship =

2012 Asian Championship

Tournament details
- Host country: Saudi Arabia
- Venue: 1 (in 1 host city)
- Dates: 26 January – 5 February
- Teams: 10 (from 1 confederation)

Final positions
- Champions: South Korea (9th title)
- Runners-up: Qatar
- Third place: Saudi Arabia
- Fourth place: Japan

Tournament statistics
- Matches played: 27
- Goals scored: 1,433 (53.07 per match)
- Attendance: 19,200 (711 per match)
- Top scorer: (Kuwait) Mohammad Al-Gharaballi (45)

Awards
- Best player: (South Korea) Lee Jae-woo

The 2012 Asian Men's Handball Championship was the 15th edition of the Asian Men's Handball Championship, held in Jeddah, Saudi Arabia, from 26 January to 5 February 2012. It acted as the Asian qualifying tournament for the 2013 World Men's Handball Championship in Spain.

Defending champions South Korea defeated Qatar in the final, for their third consecutive title, and ninth overall.

== Draw ==
Group A	Group B
South Korea; Japan; Iran; Jordan; Kuwait	Bahrain; Saudi Arabia; Qatar; United Arab Emirates; Uzbekistan

== Preliminary round ==
All times are local (UTC+3).

=== Group A ===
Team	Pld	W	D	L	GF	GA	GD	Pts
South Korea	4	4	0	0	106	87	+19	8
Japan	4	2	0	2	117	104	+13	4
Iran	4	2	0	2	99	95	+4	4
Kuwait	4	2	0	2	111	111	0	4
Jordan	4	0	0	4	80	116	−36	0

27 January 2012; 16:30	Jordan	13–25	South Korea	Green Hall, Jeddah; Attendance: 200; Referees: Al-Mawt, Al-Marhoon (BHR)
27 January 2012; 16:30	Abu-Hasan 4	(7–11)	Park J.G., Jeong H., Lee E.H. 4	Green Hall, Jeddah; Attendance: 200; Referees: Al-Mawt, Al-Marhoon (BHR)
27 January 2012; 16:30	3× (yellow card) 7× (suspension)	Report	3× (yellow card) 5× (suspension)	Green Hall, Jeddah; Attendance: 200; Referees: Al-Mawt, Al-Marhoon (BHR)

27 January 2012; 18:30	Iran	26–27	Kuwait	Green Hall, Jeddah; Attendance: 200; Referees: Milošević, Gubica (CRO)
27 January 2012; 18:30	Nadri 6	(14–14)	M. Al-Gharaballi 10	Green Hall, Jeddah; Attendance: 200; Referees: Milošević, Gubica (CRO)
27 January 2012; 18:30	3× (yellow card) 3× (suspension)	Report	3× (yellow card) 2× (suspension)	Green Hall, Jeddah; Attendance: 200; Referees: Milošević, Gubica (CRO)

28 January 2012; 14:30	Japan	35–22	Jordan	Green Hall, Jeddah; Attendance: 100; Referees: Al-Suwaidi, Ba-Matraf (QAT)
28 January 2012; 14:30	Ozawa 9	(18–10)	Abu-Hasan 5	Green Hall, Jeddah; Attendance: 100; Referees: Al-Suwaidi, Ba-Matraf (QAT)
28 January 2012; 14:30	2× (yellow card) 3× (suspension)	Report	3× (yellow card) 7× (suspension)	Green Hall, Jeddah; Attendance: 100; Referees: Al-Suwaidi, Ba-Matraf (QAT)

28 January 2012; 20:30	South Korea	26–21	Iran	Green Hall, Jeddah; Attendance: 200; Referees: Al-Marzouqi, Al-Nuaimi (UAE)
28 January 2012; 20:30	Jeong Y.K., Jung S.Y. 5	(16–7)	Jamali 6	Green Hall, Jeddah; Attendance: 200; Referees: Al-Marzouqi, Al-Nuaimi (UAE)
28 January 2012; 20:30	2× (yellow card) 2× (suspension)	Report	2× (yellow card) 3× (suspension)	Green Hall, Jeddah; Attendance: 200; Referees: Al-Marzouqi, Al-Nuaimi (UAE)

29 January 2012; 16:30	Kuwait	27–30	Japan	Green Hall, Jeddah; Attendance: 200; Referees: Guðjónsson, Elíasson (ISL)
29 January 2012; 16:30	A. Al-Gharaballi 7	(14–14)	Toyoda, Higashinagahama 7	Green Hall, Jeddah; Attendance: 200; Referees: Guðjónsson, Elíasson (ISL)
29 January 2012; 16:30	3× (yellow card) 1× (suspension)	Report	2× (yellow card)	Green Hall, Jeddah; Attendance: 200; Referees: Guðjónsson, Elíasson (ISL)

30 January 2012; 16:30	Iran	25–17	Jordan	Green Hall, Jeddah; Attendance: 100; Referees: Al-Marhoon, Al-Mawt (BHR)
30 January 2012; 16:30	Momenizadeh 8	(9–7)	Al-Mousa 6	Green Hall, Jeddah; Attendance: 100; Referees: Al-Marhoon, Al-Mawt (BHR)
30 January 2012; 16:30	3× (yellow card) 4× (suspension)	Report	3× (yellow card) 7× (suspension)	Green Hall, Jeddah; Attendance: 100; Referees: Al-Marhoon, Al-Mawt (BHR)

30 January 2012; 20:30	Kuwait	26–27	South Korea	Green Hall, Jeddah; Attendance: 200; Referees: Al-Suwaidi, Ba-Matraf (QAT)
30 January 2012; 20:30	M. Al-Gharaballi 11	(12–14)	Park J.G., Eom H.W. 5	Green Hall, Jeddah; Attendance: 200; Referees: Al-Suwaidi, Ba-Matraf (QAT)
30 January 2012; 20:30	3× (yellow card) 3× (suspension)	Report	3× (yellow card) 5× (suspension) 1× (red card)	Green Hall, Jeddah; Attendance: 200; Referees: Al-Suwaidi, Ba-Matraf (QAT)

31 January 2012; 16:30	Japan	25–27	Iran	Green Hall, Jeddah; Attendance: 200; Referees: Al-Marzouqi, Al-Nuaimi (UAE)
31 January 2012; 16:30	Ozawa, Kadoyama 5	(12–13)	A. Mousavi 9	Green Hall, Jeddah; Attendance: 200; Referees: Al-Marzouqi, Al-Nuaimi (UAE)
31 January 2012; 16:30	1× (yellow card)	Report	2× (yellow card) 3× (suspension) 1× (red card)	Green Hall, Jeddah; Attendance: 200; Referees: Al-Marzouqi, Al-Nuaimi (UAE)

1 February 2012; 18:30	South Korea	28–27	Japan	Green Hall, Jeddah; Attendance: 200; Referees: Guðjónsson, Elíasson (ISL)
1 February 2012; 18:30	Jeong Y.K. 6	(14–13)	Higashinagahama 7	Green Hall, Jeddah; Attendance: 200; Referees: Guðjónsson, Elíasson (ISL)
1 February 2012; 18:30	2× (yellow card) 3× (suspension)	Report	2× (yellow card) 1× (suspension)	Green Hall, Jeddah; Attendance: 200; Referees: Guðjónsson, Elíasson (ISL)

1 February 2012; 20:30	Jordan	28–31	Kuwait	Green Hall, Jeddah; Attendance: 200; Referees: Milošević, Gubica (CRO)
1 February 2012; 20:30	Abu-Hasan 6	(15–12)	A. Al-Gharaballi 6	Green Hall, Jeddah; Attendance: 200; Referees: Milošević, Gubica (CRO)
1 February 2012; 20:30	3× (yellow card) 1× (suspension)	Report	2× (yellow card) 2× (suspension)	Green Hall, Jeddah; Attendance: 200; Referees: Milošević, Gubica (CRO)

=== Group B ===
Team	Pld	W	D	L	GF	GA	GD	Pts
Qatar	4	3	1	0	120	90	+30	7
Saudi Arabia (H)	4	2	2	0	120	80	+40	6
Bahrain	4	2	1	1	131	94	+37	5
United Arab Emirates	4	1	0	3	109	104	+5	2
Uzbekistan	4	0	0	4	68	180	−112	0

(H) Hosts

26 January 2012; 14:30	United Arab Emirates	40–20	Uzbekistan	Green Hall, Jeddah; Attendance: 200; Referees: Hizaki, Ikebuchi (JPN)
26 January 2012; 14:30	Al-Saffar 8	(22–13)	Ignatenko 6	Green Hall, Jeddah; Attendance: 200; Referees: Hizaki, Ikebuchi (JPN)
26 January 2012; 14:30	1× (yellow card) 3× (suspension)	Report	2× (yellow card) 4× (suspension)	Green Hall, Jeddah; Attendance: 200; Referees: Hizaki, Ikebuchi (JPN)

26 January 2012; 20:00	Bahrain	23–23	Saudi Arabia	Green Hall, Jeddah; Attendance: 1,000; Referees: Guðjónsson, Elíasson (ISL)
26 January 2012; 20:00	J. Abdulqader 6	(9–13)	Al-Salem 6	Green Hall, Jeddah; Attendance: 1,000; Referees: Guðjónsson, Elíasson (ISL)
26 January 2012; 20:00	3× (yellow card) 7× (suspension) 1× (red card)	Report	3× (yellow card) 6× (suspension) 1× (red card)	Green Hall, Jeddah; Attendance: 1,000; Referees: Guðjónsson, Elíasson (ISL)

27 January 2012; 14:30	Qatar	41–19	Uzbekistan	Green Hall, Jeddah; Attendance: 200; Referees: Koo, Lee (KOR)
27 January 2012; 14:30	Abdulla 8	(23–5)	Sayukov 6	Green Hall, Jeddah; Attendance: 200; Referees: Koo, Lee (KOR)
27 January 2012; 14:30	3× (yellow card) 2× (suspension)	Report	4× (suspension)	Green Hall, Jeddah; Attendance: 200; Referees: Koo, Lee (KOR)

28 January 2012; 16:30	Bahrain	26–27	Qatar	Green Hall, Jeddah; Attendance: 200; Referees: Milošević, Gubica (CRO)
28 January 2012; 16:30	J. Abdulqader, M. Abdulqader 6	(13–12)	Al-Rayes 10	Green Hall, Jeddah; Attendance: 200; Referees: Milošević, Gubica (CRO)
28 January 2012; 16:30	3× (yellow card) 5× (suspension)	Report	2× (yellow card) 6× (suspension)	Green Hall, Jeddah; Attendance: 200; Referees: Milošević, Gubica (CRO)

28 January 2012; 18:30	Saudi Arabia	26–19	United Arab Emirates	Green Hall, Jeddah; Attendance: 1,000; Referees: Al-Mutawa, Al-Suwailam (KUW)
28 January 2012; 18:30	Al-Habib, Al-Salem 5	(15–10)	Al-Bannai 5	Green Hall, Jeddah; Attendance: 1,000; Referees: Al-Mutawa, Al-Suwailam (KUW)
28 January 2012; 18:30	3× (yellow card) 7× (suspension)	Report	2× (yellow card) 5× (suspension)	Green Hall, Jeddah; Attendance: 1,000; Referees: Al-Mutawa, Al-Suwailam (KUW)

29 January 2012; 18:30	Uzbekistan	14–47	Saudi Arabia	Green Hall, Jeddah; Attendance: 500; Referees: Lee, Koo (KOR)
29 January 2012; 18:30	Ikramov 5	(6–22)	Al-Abdulali 10	Green Hall, Jeddah; Attendance: 500; Referees: Lee, Koo (KOR)
29 January 2012; 18:30	2× (yellow card) 5× (suspension)	Report	3× (yellow card) 1× (suspension)	Green Hall, Jeddah; Attendance: 500; Referees: Lee, Koo (KOR)

30 January 2012; 14:30	Qatar	28–21	United Arab Emirates	Green Hall, Jeddah; Attendance: 200; Referees: Al-Mutawa, Al-Suwailam (KUW)
30 January 2012; 14:30	Al-Rayes 8	(12–9)	Abdulla, Al-Ali, Al-Dhanhani 5	Green Hall, Jeddah; Attendance: 200; Referees: Al-Mutawa, Al-Suwailam (KUW)
30 January 2012; 14:30	3× (yellow card) 5× (suspension)	Report	2× (yellow card) 4× (suspension) 2× (red card)	Green Hall, Jeddah; Attendance: 200; Referees: Al-Mutawa, Al-Suwailam (KUW)

30 January 2012; 18:30	Uzbekistan	15–52	Bahrain	Green Hall, Jeddah; Attendance: 100; Referees: Hizaki, Ikebuchi (JPN)
30 January 2012; 18:30	Ignatenko 8	(8–24)	A. Abdulqader 12	Green Hall, Jeddah; Attendance: 100; Referees: Hizaki, Ikebuchi (JPN)
30 January 2012; 18:30	2× (yellow card) 6× (suspension)	Report	3× (yellow card) 2× (suspension)	Green Hall, Jeddah; Attendance: 100; Referees: Hizaki, Ikebuchi (JPN)

31 January 2012; 18:30	Saudi Arabia	24–24	Qatar	Green Hall, Jeddah; Attendance: 1,000; Referees: Milošević, Gubica (CRO)
31 January 2012; 18:30	Al-Harbi 5	(10–14)	Mabrouk 8	Green Hall, Jeddah; Attendance: 1,000; Referees: Milošević, Gubica (CRO)
31 January 2012; 18:30	3× (yellow card) 2× (suspension)	Report	3× (yellow card) 2× (suspension)	Green Hall, Jeddah; Attendance: 1,000; Referees: Milošević, Gubica (CRO)

1 February 2012; 14:30	United Arab Emirates	29–30	Bahrain	Green Hall, Jeddah; Attendance: 200; Referees: Hizaki, Ikebuchi (JPN)
1 February 2012; 14:30	Al-Ali 7	(12–14)	Four players 5	Green Hall, Jeddah; Attendance: 200; Referees: Hizaki, Ikebuchi (JPN)
1 February 2012; 14:30	3× (yellow card) 1× (suspension)	Report	1× (yellow card) 1× (suspension)	Green Hall, Jeddah; Attendance: 200; Referees: Hizaki, Ikebuchi (JPN)

== Placement 5th–10th ==
=== 9th/10th ===
2 February 2012; 14:00	Jordan	32–30	Uzbekistan	Green Hall, Jeddah; Attendance: 100; Referees: Al-Amiry, Al-Dosery (KSA)
2 February 2012; 14:00	Al-Atabi 9	(17–17)	Ignatenko 9	Green Hall, Jeddah; Attendance: 100; Referees: Al-Amiry, Al-Dosery (KSA)
2 February 2012; 14:00	3× (yellow card) 4× (suspension)	Report	3× (yellow card) 6× (suspension)	Green Hall, Jeddah; Attendance: 100; Referees: Al-Amiry, Al-Dosery (KSA)

=== 7th/8th ===
3 February 2012; 14:30	Kuwait	29–31	United Arab Emirates	Green Hall, Jeddah; Attendance: 100; Referees: Koo, Lee (KOR)
3 February 2012; 14:30	M. Al-Gharaballi 14	(12–15)	Al-Dhanhani 6	Green Hall, Jeddah; Attendance: 100; Referees: Koo, Lee (KOR)
3 February 2012; 14:30	3× (yellow card)	Report	3× (yellow card) 3× (suspension)	Green Hall, Jeddah; Attendance: 100; Referees: Koo, Lee (KOR)

=== 5th/6th ===
3 February 2012; 16:30	Iran	25–20	Bahrain	Green Hall, Jeddah; Attendance: 100; Referees: Ba-Matraf, Al-Suwaidi (QAT)
3 February 2012; 16:30	Jamali 6	(11–12)	Jawher, Al-Maqabi 4	Green Hall, Jeddah; Attendance: 100; Referees: Ba-Matraf, Al-Suwaidi (QAT)
3 February 2012; 16:30	2× (yellow card) 2× (suspension)	Report	2× (yellow card) 3× (suspension)	Green Hall, Jeddah; Attendance: 100; Referees: Ba-Matraf, Al-Suwaidi (QAT)

== Final round ==
Semifinals
3 February – Jeddah
South Korea	27
Saudi Arabia	26
3 February – Jeddah
Qatar	33
Japan	28

Gold medal match
5 February – Jeddah
South Korea	23
Qatar	22
Bronze medal match
5 February – Jeddah
Saudi Arabia	25
Japan	21

=== Semifinals ===
3 February 2012; 18:30	South Korea	27–26	Saudi Arabia	Green Hall, Jeddah; Attendance: 5,000; Referees: Guðjónsson, Elíasson (ISL)
3 February 2012; 18:30	Yoon K.S. 8	(14–13)	Al-Mohsin 8	Green Hall, Jeddah; Attendance: 5,000; Referees: Guðjónsson, Elíasson (ISL)
3 February 2012; 18:30	3× (yellow card) 6× (suspension)	Report	3× (yellow card) 5× (suspension)	Green Hall, Jeddah; Attendance: 5,000; Referees: Guðjónsson, Elíasson (ISL)

3 February 2012; 20:30	Qatar	33–28	Japan	Green Hall, Jeddah; Attendance: 500; Referees: Milošević, Gubica (CRO)
3 February 2012; 20:30	Mabrouk 8	(19–13)	Toyoda 9	Green Hall, Jeddah; Attendance: 500; Referees: Milošević, Gubica (CRO)
3 February 2012; 20:30	3× (yellow card) 2× (suspension)	Report	3× (yellow card)	Green Hall, Jeddah; Attendance: 500; Referees: Milošević, Gubica (CRO)

=== Bronze medal match ===
5 February 2012; 16:30	Saudi Arabia	25–21	Japan	Green Hall, Jeddah; Attendance: 2,000; Referees: Milošević, Gubica (CRO)
5 February 2012; 16:30	Al-Harbi 7	(13–11)	Toyoda 5	Green Hall, Jeddah; Attendance: 2,000; Referees: Milošević, Gubica (CRO)
5 February 2012; 16:30	3× (yellow card) 2× (suspension)	Report	3× (yellow card) 3× (suspension)	Green Hall, Jeddah; Attendance: 2,000; Referees: Milošević, Gubica (CRO)

=== Gold medal match ===
5 February 2012; 18:30	South Korea	23–22	Qatar	Green Hall, Jeddah; Attendance: 5,000; Referees: Guðjónsson, Elíasson (ISL)
5 February 2012; 18:30	Yoon K.S. 7	(10–11)	Mabrouk 9	Green Hall, Jeddah; Attendance: 5,000; Referees: Guðjónsson, Elíasson (ISL)
5 February 2012; 18:30	3× (yellow card) 5× (suspension)	Report	3× (yellow card) 6× (suspension)	Green Hall, Jeddah; Attendance: 5,000; Referees: Guðjónsson, Elíasson (ISL)

== Final standing ==
Rank	Team
1st place, gold medalist(s)	South Korea
2nd place, silver medalist(s)	Qatar
3rd place, bronze medalist(s)	Saudi Arabia
4	Japan
5	Iran
6	Bahrain
7	United Arab Emirates
8	Kuwait
9	Jordan
10	Uzbekistan

Team qualified for the 2013 World Championship

== Awards ==
- Most Valuable Player: Lee Jae-woo (KOR)
- Best Goalkeeper: Manaf Al-Saeed (KSA)
- Fair Play Award: South Korea

== Squads of the teams on the podium ==
Squads of the teams on the podium are:

Asian winner: South Korea

- 1 – Lee Chang-woo (GK)
- 12 – Park Chan-young (GK)
- 26 – Yong Min-ho (GK)
- 2 – Jeong Yi-kyeong
- 7 – Jung Su-young
- 8 – Park Jung-geu
- 10 – Park Chan-yong
- 11 – Lim Duk-jun
- 13 – Lee Jae-woo
- 17 – Yu Dong-geun
- 19 – Jeong Han
- 22 – Lee Eun-ho
- 28 – Lee Jyeon-sik
- 33 – Eom Hyo-won
- 77 – Yoon Kyung-shin
- 88 – Jung Jin-ho

Head coach:

- Choi Suk-jae

Asian runner-up: Qatar

- 12 – Mohsen Yafai (GK)
- 18 – Yousef Al-Maalem (GK)
- 1 – Bader Al-Ghamdi
- 4 – Hassan Mabrouk
- 6 – Hamad Madadi
- 7 – Abdulla Ramazan
- 8 – Wajdi Sinen
- 9 – Mohamed Mahjbi
- 10 – Fawaz Al-Moadhadi
- 13 – Eldar Memišević
- 14 – Bassel Airayes
- 15 – Hamad Al-Hajiri
- 25 – Amine Khedher
- 27 – Mahmoud Osman
- 29 – Aymen Kharbech
- 88 – Hadi Hamdoon

Head coach:

- Borut Maček

Bronze medallists: Saudi Arabia

- 12 – Manaf Al-Saeed (GK)
- 16 – Mohammad Al-Salem (GK)
- 1 – Qusai Al-Saeed
- 4 – Ghazi Al-Harbi
- 5 – Hassan Al-Janabi
- 6 – Yasser Shakhor
- 7 – Hussain Al-Ekkhwan
- 8 – Hisham Al-Obadi
- 10 – Hussain Al-Mohsin
- 13 – Mustafa Al-Habib
- 14 – Nabil Al-Obaidi
- 15 – Ahmed Al-Abdulali
- 19 – Bandar Al-Harbi
- 20 – Turki Al-Enbaawi
- 22 – Mahdi Al-Salem
- 25 – Fathi Al-Khudami
- 98 – Yousof Al-Taweel

Head coach:

- Hani Al-Hillal
