= Tai Wai (disambiguation) =

Tai Wai or Taiwai may refer to:

== Places ==
- Taiyuan Foreign Language School (nickname: Taiwai, 太外), Taiyuan, Shanxi, China; a secondary school

=== Hong Kong ===
- Tai Wai (大圍), Sha Tin, New Territories, Hong Kong
  - Tai Wai Village (大圍村, Tai Wai Tsuen), Tai Wai, Sha Tin, New Territories, Hong Kong; a walled village
  - Tai Wai Nullah (Tai Wai Stream, 大圍渠), Tai Wai, Sha Tin, New Territories, Hong Kong; a watercourse, a tributary of the Shing Mun River
  - Tai Wai station, Tai Wai, Sha Tin, New Territories, Hong Kong; a mass rapid transit interchange station
  - Tai Wai Tunnel, Tsing Sha Highway, New Territories, Hong Kong; an expressway tunnel in Sha Tin district
  - Tai Wai Road (大圍道), Tai Wai, Sha Tin, New Territories, Hong Kong; see Shing Mun Tunnels
  - Tai Wai (constituency) of the Sha Tin District Council, in New Territories, Hong Kong
  - Tai Wai Campus, UOW College Hong Kong, Tai Wai, Sha Tin, New Territories, Hong Kong; an international campus of the University of Wollongong
- Tai Wai Tsuen (Yuen Long District) (Tai Wai Village, 大圍村), Yuen Long Kau Hui, Yuen Long, New Territories, Hong Kong
- Tai Wai (大灣), Tai Long Wan (Sai Kung District), New Territories, Hong Kong

== People ==
Chinese given name "Taiwai", "Tai-wai", "Tai Wai"

- David Chiang Tai-wai (born 1947, 姜大衛), Hongkonger filmmaker and martial artist
- Fung Tai-wai, manhua artist, author of Entertainment News; see List of manhua
- David Ho Tai-wai, a Hongkong politician representing Sai Kung North (constituency), Sai Kung, Tai Po, New Territories, Hong Kong; part of the Tai Po District Council
- David Wan Tai-wai, member of the Hong Kong Election Committee; see List of members of the Election Committee of Hong Kong, 2017–21
- David Wong Tai Wai, head coach for 2012 East Asian Cup Hong Kong national baseball team
- David Wu Tai Wai (born 1952, 胡大為), Hongkonger-Canadian filmmaker
- Yiu Tai Wai, Hong Kong handball player at the 2010, 2006 Asian Games

=== Fictional characters ===
Chinese given name "Taiwai", "Tai-wai", "Tai Wai"

- Dom Cheung Tai-wai (張大偉), a character from the 2015 Hong Kong TV show Angel In-the-Making
- Fung Tai-wai (馮大偉), a character from the 2015 Hong Kong film Little Big Master
- Kong Tai-wai (江大偉), a character from the 1982 Hong Kong TV show The Emissary
- Ko Tai-wai (高大威), a character from the 2015 Hong Kong TV show Brick Slaves
- Chief Inspector Lo Tai-wai, a character from the 1988 Hong Kong film Final Justice

== See also ==
- Tai Wai Tsuen (disambiguation) (Tai Wai Village, 大圍村)
- Tai (disambiguation)
- Wai (disambiguation)
