= Lee Tae-yeong =

- Hangul: 이태영
- RR: I Taeyeong
- MR: I T'aeyŏng

Lee Tae-yeong (Korean: 이태영; in North Korea spelled 리태영) is the name of:

- Lee Tai-young (1914–1998), South Korean female lawyer and judge
- Lee Tea-young (born 1977), South Korean male handball player

== See also ==
- Lee (Korean surname), for other people with the same surname
- Tae-young, for other people with the same given name
