= Wanlong =

Wanlong may refer to:

- Wanlong metro station, a metro station of the Taipei Metro
- Liu Wanlong (born 1962), Chinese lieutenant general
- Wanlong, Jiangxi, a township in Xinfeng County, Jiangxi, China

== See also ==
- Wan Long (disambiguation)
- Wang Long
- Bandung, a city in Indonesia, written as 萬隆 in Chinese
