= Wang Quan (handballer) =

Chinese handball player (born 1992)

Personal information
- Nationality: Chinese
- Born: 21 November 1992 (age 33) Benxi, China
- Height: 2.05 m (6 ft 9 in)

Sport
- Sport: Handball
- Position: Goalkeeper
- Current club: RK Zagreb
- Number: 51

Senior clubs
- Years: Team
- –: Jiangsu Suzhou
- –: RK Zamet
- –: Beijing Sport University
- 2020: RK Zagreb
National team
- Years: Team
- 2010–: China

Wang Quan (born 21 November 1992) is a Chinese international handballer, who plays as goalkeeper for Croatian club RK Zagreb.

As an international for China men's national handball team he has competed at the 2010 and 2014 Asian Games, and at the 2010, 2012, 2014, 2016 and 2018 Asian Championship
