= Wan Long =

Wan Long may refer to:

- Wān Long, village in Myanmar
- Wan Long (businessman), Chinese billionaire

== See also ==
- Wang Long
- Wanlong (disambiguation)
