= Cui Liang =

Cui Liang may refer to:

- Cui Liang (handballer) (born 1983), a Chinese handball player.
- Cui Liang, a fictional character in the historical novel Romance of the Three Kingdoms. See List of fictional people of the Three Kingdoms#Chapter 92.
