= Wai-Wai =

Wai-Wai may refer to:

- Wai-wai people, an Indigenous group in Brazil and Guyana
  - Waiwai language, the language of this group
- Wai Wai (food brand), a noodle dish
- WaiWai, a discontinued column published in the Mainichi Daily News

== See also ==
- Wai (disambiguation)
