= Ashraf Mabrouk Awaad =

Egyptian handball player

Ashraf Mabrouk Awaad (born June 1, 1972) is an Egyptian handball player. He competed for Egypt's national team at the 1992, 1996, 2000 Summer Olympics.

His brothers, Hazem, Hussein, Belal, Ibrahim and Hassan, are also international handball players.
