= Hazem Mabrouk Awaad =

Egyptian handball player

Personal information
- Nationality: Egyptian
- Born: 22 November 1973 (age 52)

Sport
- Sport: Handball

Hazem Mabrouk Awaad (born 22 November 1973) is an Egyptian handball player. He competed in the men's tournament at the 2000 Summer Olympics.

His brothers, Ashraf, Hussein, Belal, Ibrahim and Hassan, are also international handball players.
