= Tae-young =

- Hangul: 태영
- RR: Taeyeong
- MR: T'aeyŏng

Tae-young is a Korean given name.

People with this name include:

== Entertainers ==
- Yoon Tae-young (born 1974), South Korean actor
- Ki Tae-young (born Kim Yong-woo, 1978), South Korean actor
- Son Tae-young (born 1980), South Korean actress
- Kim Taeyoung (born 2003), South Korean singer, member of Cravity

== Politicians and public policy figures ==
- Ham Tae-young (1873–1954), leader of the Presbyterian Church of Korea, later a South Korean politician
- Lee Tai-young (1914–1988), South Korea's first female lawyer
- Kim Tae-young (military) (born 1949), South Korean male general, later Minister of Defense

== Sportspeople ==
- Kim Tae-young (footballer, born 1970), South Korean football manager and former player
- Taiei Kin (born 1970), Korean-Japanese light heavyweight karateka, kickboxer and mixed martial artist
- Lee Tea-young (born 1977), South Korean handball player
- Han Tae-young (born 1979), South Korean Greco-Roman wrestler
- Yang Tae-young (born 1980), South Korean gymnast
- Kim Tae-young (footballer, born 1982), South Korean footballer
- Kim Tae-young (footballer, born 1987), South Korean footballer

== Fictional characters ==
- Tae Young, character in American film Turning Red
- Tae-young, character in South Korean film Cart
- Tae-young, character in South Korean television series He Who Can't Marry
- Tae-young, character in South Korean television series My Husband Got a Family

== See also ==
- List of Korean given names
- Richard Rutt (1925–2011), English Roman Catholic missionary in South Korea, who used the Korean name No Taeyŏng
