= Tai Wai Tsuen =

Tai Wai Tsuen (Chinese: 大圍村) may refer to several places in Hong Kong:

- Tai Wai Tsuen, the original village of Tai Wai, Sha Tin District
- Tai Wai Tsuen (Yuen Long District), a village in the Yuen Long Kau Hui and Shap Pat Heung areas of Yuen Long District

== See also ==
- Tai Wai (disambiguation)
