= Abouelfetoh Abdelrazek =

Egyptian handball player

Personal information
- Nationality: Egyptian
- Born: 12 February 1987 (age 39)
- Height: 1.93 m (6 ft 4 in)

Sport
- Sport: Handball
- Position: Right back
- Current club: Smouha SC
National team
Years	Team	Apps	(Gls)
–	Egypt	125	(457)

Abouelfetoh Abdelrazek (أبو الفتوح عبد الرازق, born 12 February 1987) is an Egyptian male handball player for Smouha SC and the Egyptian national team.

He was a part of the team at the 2008 Summer Olympics.
