= Yuragiin Sainkhüü =

Mongolian footballer

Personal information
- Full name: Yuragiin Sainkhüü; Юрагийн Сайнхүү
- Date of birth: November 14, 1986 (age 39)
- Place of birth: Mongolia
- Height: 1.88 m (6 ft 2 in)
- Position: Goalkeeper

Team information
- Current team: Erchim

Senior career*
Years	Team	Apps	(Gls)
2007–	Erchim		

International career
2007–	Mongolia	6	(0)
- * Club domestic league appearances and goals

Yuragiin Sainkhüü (Mongolian: Юрагийн Сайнхүү; born 14 November 1986) is a Mongolian international footballer. He made his first appearance for the Mongolia national football team in 2007.

He also played for the Mongolia men's national handball team at the 2010 Asian Games as a left wing.
