= Hassan Mabrouk =

Egyptian-Qatari handball player (born 1982)

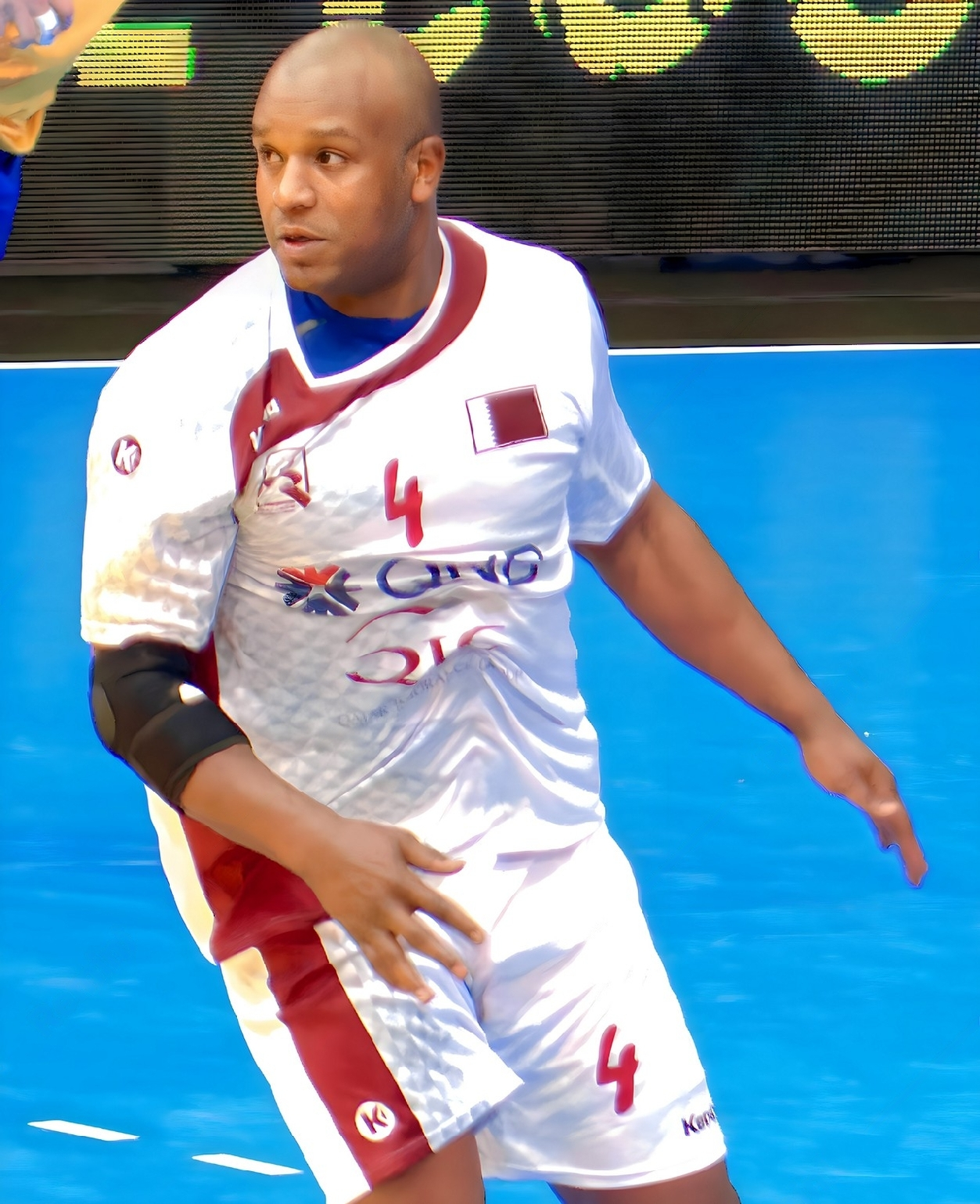

Personal information
- Nationality: Egyptian/Qatari
- Born: 29 July 1982 (age 44)
- Height: 1.90 m (6 ft 3 in)

Sport
- Sport: Handball
- Position: Pivot
- Current club: Al Ahli
- Number: 4
National team
Years	Team		
–	Egypt		
–	Qatar	36	(65)
Medal record
World Championship
Silver medal – second place	2015 Qatar	Qatar
African Championship
Gold medal – first place	2008 Angola	Egypt
Asian Championship
Silver medal – second place	2012 South Korea	Saudi Arabia
Gold medal – first place	2014 Bahrain	Qatar
Gold medal – first place	2016 Bahrain	Qatar
Gold medal – first place	2018 South Korea	Qatar
Gold medal – first place	2020 Kuwait	Qatar

Hassan Mabrouk (born 29 July 1982) is an Egyptian-Qatari handball player for Al Rayyan and the Qatari national team.

Mabrouk has previously played for the Egyptian national team at the 2008 Summer Olympics.

He was part of the Qatar team that won silver medals at the 2015 World Championship in Qatar, the first World Championship medal for both Qatar and for any Asian team. The result was however controversial due to the many naturalized players of Qatar, of which Mabrouk was one of them. According to the Frankfurter Allgemeine, only four of the 17 players in the squad were native to Qatar. The practice was criticised by Austrian goalkeeper after his team's loss to Qatar in the round of 16, saying "It [felt] like playing against a world selection team" and "I think it is not the sense of a world championship." Furthermore, there were claims of favourable refereering for the hosts. After the final whistle of their semifinal against Poland, the Polish players showed their discontent by ironically applauding the three referees.

His brothers, Ashraf, Hazem, Hussein, Belal and Ibrahim, are also international handball players.
