= Belal Mabrouk =

Egyptian handball player

Belal Mabrouk (born 2 August 1984) is an Egyptian handball player who competed in the 2008 Summer Olympics.

His brothers, Ashraf, Hazem, Hussein, Ibrahim and Hassan, are also international handball players.
