= Wai =

Wai or WAI may refer to:

== Places ==
- Wai, Maharashtra, a small town in India
  - Wai (Vidhan Sabha constituency), a Maharashtra Legislative Assembly constituency centered around the town
- Wao State (Vav, Wai, Way), a former princely state in Banas Katha, Gujarat, India
- Wa (Japan) (倭), the Cantonese pronunciation of an ancient name of Japan, sometimes transcribed as Wai
- Koh Wai, also known as Poulo Wai or the Wai Islands, is a group of two small uninhabited islands in the Gulf of Siam, Cambodia
- The Wai, Tai Wai station, Tai Wai, New Territories, Hong Kong; a shopping mall on top of Tai Wai station

== Other ==
- Wai, a term referring to the walled villages of Hong Kong
- Wai, the Cantonese-derived orthography for the Chinese surname Wéi (surname 韋)
- Wai, Māori word for "water" or "river", used as a common prefix in New Zealand place names
- Wai, a form of Thai greeting
- Web Accessibility Initiative, an effort to improve the accessibility of the World Wide Web (WWW or Web) for people with disabilities
- NO WAI, a phrase that is part of the O RLY? Internet meme

== See also ==
- Wai-Wai (disambiguation)
