= Walid Abdel Maksoud =

Egyptian handball player

Personal information
- Nationality: Egyptian
- Born: 14 June 1979 (age 46)

Sport
- Sport: Handball

Walid Abdel Maksoud (born 14 June 1979) is an Egyptian handball player. He competed in the 2008 Summer Olympics.
