= Hussein Mabrouk =

Egyptian handball player

Personal information
- Nationality: Egyptian
- Born: 30 April 1980 (age 45)

Sport
- Sport: Handball

Hussein Mabrouk (born 30 April 1980) is an Egyptian handball player. He competed in the men's tournament at the 2008 Summer Olympics.

His brothers, Ashraf, Hazem, Belal, Ibrahim and Hassan, are also international handball players.
