= Changwon Gymnasium =

Sports venue in Changwon, South Korea

Coordinates: 35°13′57.9″N 128°39′58.8″E

Changwon Gymnasium 昌原室內體育館
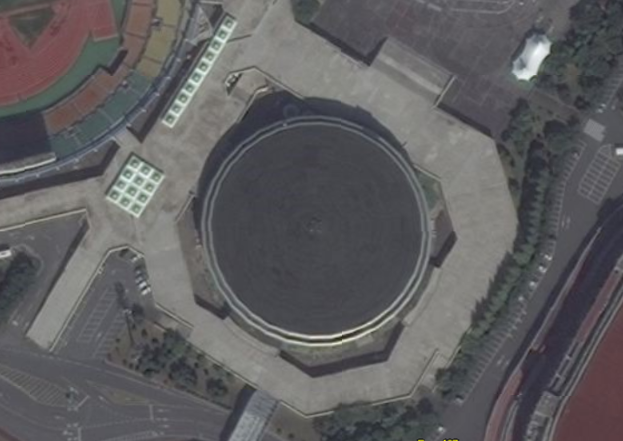
- Interactive map of Changwon Gymnasium 昌原室內體育館
- Full name: Changwon Indoor Gymnasium
- Location: Changwon, South Korea
- Owner: Changwon
- Operator: Changwon City Facilities Management Corporation
- Capacity: 6,000

Construction
- Opened: November 4, 1996
- Cost

Tenant
- Changwon LG Sakers

Changwon Gymnasium is an arena in Changwon, South Korea. It is the home arena of the Changwon LG Sakers of the Korean Basketball League.
