= Ko Kyung-soo =

South Korean handball player (born 1985)

- Hangul: 고경수
- RR: Go Gyeongsu
- MR: Ko Kyŏngsu

Ko Kyung-soo (born 5 February 1985) is a South Korean handball player who competed in the 2008 Summer Olympics and 2012 Summer Olympics.
