= Zhu Wenxin =

Chinese handball player (born 1980)

Zhu Wenxin (born February 11, 1980) was the left wing position in the 2008 Beijing Olympic Games handball sport. He did not win a medal, nor did the team get through into the finals.
