= Wang Xiaolong (handballer) =

Chinese handball player (born 1989)

Wang Xiaolong (born 17 August 1989) is a Chinese handball player who competed in the 2008 Summer Olympics.
