= Mahdi Al-Salem =

Saudi Arabian handball player

Personal information
- Nationality: Saudi Arabian
- Born: 16 February 1990 (age 36)
- Height: 1.88 m (6 ft 2 in)

Sport
- Sport: Handball
- Position: Left Back
- Current club: Al-Khaleej Club
- Number: 22
National team
Years	Team	Apps	(Gls)
–	Saudi Arabia	133	(429)
Medal record
Asian Championship
Bronze medal – third place	2022 Saudi Arabia
- Updated on 12 January 2023

Mahdi Al-Salem (Arabic: مهدي آل سالم; born 16 February 1990) is a Saudi Arabian handball player for Al-Khaleej Club and the Saudi Arabia national team.
