= Manaf Al-Saeed =

Saudi Arabian handball player

Personal information
- Nationality: Saudi Arabian
- Born: 19 May 1976 (age 50)
- Height: 1.89 m (6 ft 2 1/2 in)

Sport
- Sport: Handball
- Position: Goalkeeper
- Current club: Al-Noor
National team
Years	Team	Apps	(Gls)
–	Saudi Arabia	206	(14)

Manaf Al-Saeed (Arabic: مناف آل سعيد; born 19 May 1976) is a former Saudi Arabian handball player for Al-Noor and the Saudi Arabian national team. Al-Saeed retired in 2015.

He participated at the 2017 World Men's Handball Championship.
