= Allahkaram Esteki =

Iranian handball player (born 1988)

Personal information
- Nationality: Iranian
- Born: 19 March 1988 (age 38) Isfahan, Iran
- Height: 1.93 m (6 ft 4 in)

Sport
- Sport: Handball
- Position: Left Back

Senior clubs
- Years: Team
- 2005–2015: Sepahan
- 2015–04/2016: Montpellier Handball
- 04-06/2016: Lekhwiya HT
- 2016–2018: Dinamo București
- 2018–01/2020: CSM București
- 01–06/2020: BM Puente Genil
- 2020–2022: HC Buzău
National team
Years	Team	Apps	(Gls)
2006–2020	Iran	95	(437)
Medal record
Asian Games
Silver medal – second place	2010 Guangzhou	Team
Bronze medal – third place	2006 Doha	Team
Asian Championship
Bronze medal – third place	2014 Manama	Team

Allahkaram Esteki (Persian: الله‌كرم استکی, born 19 March 1988) is an Iranian handball player.

He was Iran's top scorer at the 2015 World Championship after netting 30 goals.

Allahkaram's young brother, Sajjad, is also handballer.

== Achievements ==
- Coupe de France:
  - Winner: 2016
- Coupe de la Ligue:
  - Winner: 2016
- Supercupa României:2016
