= Zhang Ji (handballer) =

Chinese handball player (born 1978)

Zhang Ji (Chinese: 张骥; pinyin: Zhāng Jì; born 5 November 1978) is a Chinese handball player who competed in the 2008 Summer Olympics.
