= Cui Lei =

Chinese handball player (born 1980)

Cui Lei (Chinese: 崔磊; pinyin: Cuī Lěi; born 25 October 1980) is a Chinese handball player who competed in the 2008 Summer Olympics with his younger brother Cui Liang. He also competed the 1998 and 2002 Asian Games.
