= Park Chan-yong (handballer) =

South Korean handball player (born 1980)

Park Chan-Yeong]
Personal information
- Nationality: South Korean
- Born: January 1, 1980 (age 46)
- Height: 6 ft 2 in (189 cm)

Sport
- Sport: Handball
National team
- Years: Team
- 2004-2008: South Korea

- Park Chan-yong
- Hangul: 박찬용
- RR: Bak Chanyong
- MR: Pak Ch'anyong

Park Chan-yong (born 1 January 1980) is a Korean handball player who competed in the 2004 Summer Olympics and in the 2008 Summer Olympics.
