= Bassel Al-Rayes =

Qatari handball player (born 1979)

Personal information
- Nationality: Syrian/Qatari
- Born: 4 March 1979 (age 47)
- Height: 1.80 m (5 ft 11 in)

Sport
- Sport: Handball
- Position: Pivot
- Current club: Al Rayyan
- Number: 15
National team
Years	Team	Apps	(Gls)
–	Qatar	45	(159)

Bassel Al-Rayes (born 4 March 1979) is a Syrian-born Qatari handball player for Al Rayyan and the Qatari national team.

He participated at the 2016 Summer Olympics in Rio de Janeiro, in the men's handball tournament.
