= Ye Qiang =

Chinese handball player (born 1978)

Ye Qiang (born 16 June 1978) is a Chinese handball player who competed in the 2008 Summer Olympics.
