= Yan Liang (handballer) =

Chinese handball player (born 1985)

Yan Liang (Chinese: 闫亮; pinyin: Yán Liàng; born 23 January 1985) is a Chinese handball player who competed in the 2008 Summer Olympics.
