= Tian Jianxia =

Chinese handball player (born 1986)

Tian Jianxia (born 3 September 1986) is a Chinese men's handball player who competed in the 2008 Summer Olympics.
