= Mohammed Al-Salem =

Saudi Arabian handball player

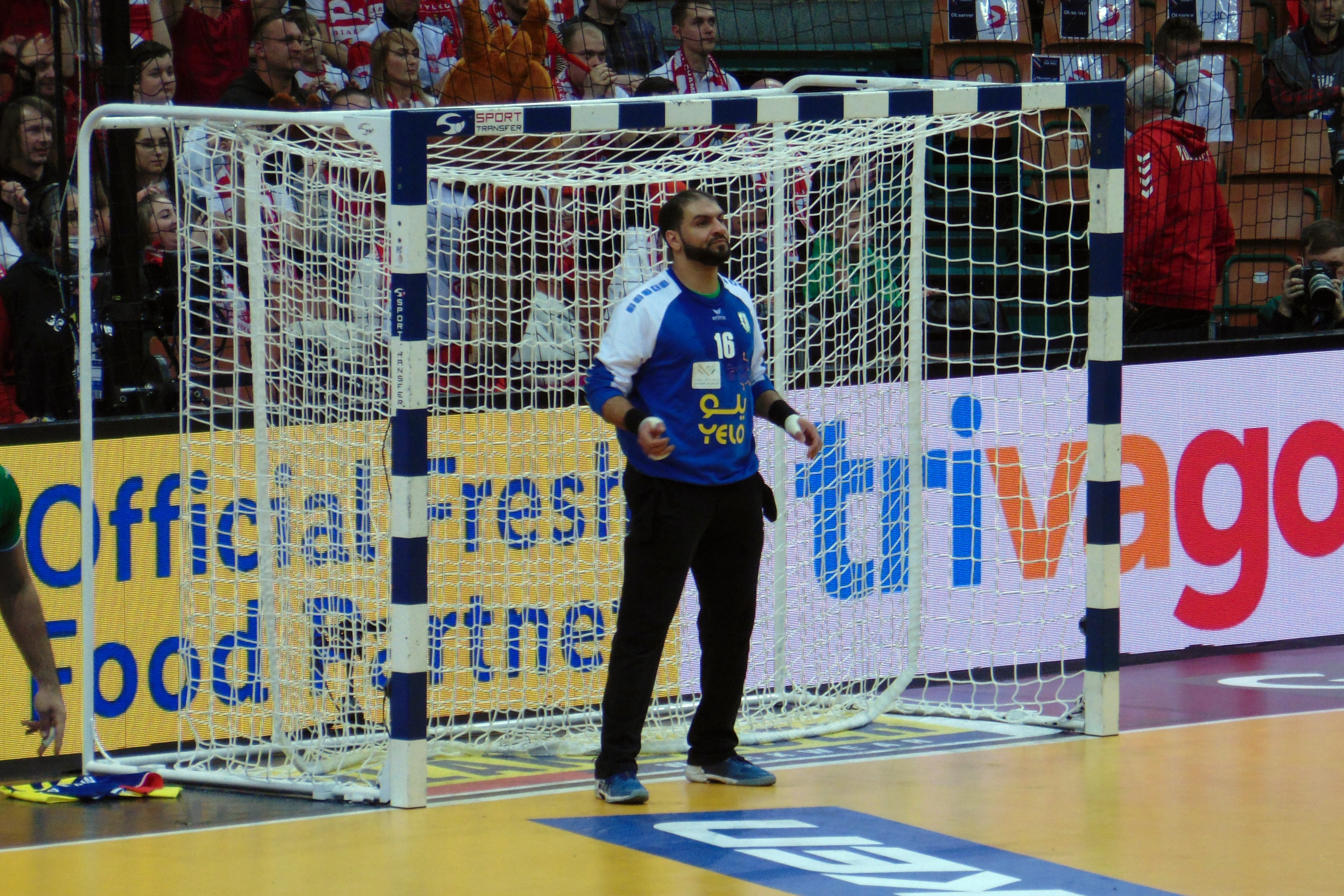
- Mohammed Al-Salem, World Men's Handball Championship in Katowice

Personal information
- Nationality: Saudi Arabian
- Born: 3 April 1986 (age 40)
- Height: 1.85 m (6 ft 1 in)

Sport
- Sport: Handball
- Position: Goalkeeper
- Current club: Khaleej Club
- Number: 16
National team
Years	Team	Apps	(Gls)
–	Saudi Arabia	217	(5)
Medal record
Asian Championship
Bronze medal – third place	2022 Saudi Arabia

Mohammed Al-Salem (Arabic: محمد السالم; born 3 April 1986) is a Saudi Arabian handball player for Khaleej Club and the Saudi Arabian national team.
