= Tetsuya Kadoyama =

Japanese handball player (born 1983)

Personal information
- Nationality: Japanese
- Born: 22 October 1983 (age 42)
- Height: 1.86 m (6 ft 1 in)

Sport
- Sport: Handball
- Position: Centre back
- Current club: Toyota Auto Body
National team
Years	Team	Apps	(Gls)
–	Japan	120	(347)

Tetsuya Kadoyama (born 22 October 1983) is a Japanese handball player for Toyota Auto Body and the Japanese national team.

He represented Japan at the 2019 World Men's Handball Championship.
