= Zhou Xiaojian =

Chinese handball player (born 1985)

Zhou Xiaojian (born 13 January 1985) is a Chinese handball player who competed in the 2008 Summer Olympics. He scored 113 goals.
