= Miao Qing =

Chinese handball player (born 1983)

Miao Qing (born 4 February 1983 in Tianjin) is a Chinese male handball player who competed in the 2008 Summer Olympics.
