= Kim Tea-wan =

South Korean handball player (born 1980)

Kim Tea-Wan (born 15 February 1980) is a South Korean handball player who competed in the 2004 Summer Olympics and in the 2008 Summer Olympics.
