= Wang Long =

Chinese handball player (born 1985)

Wang Long (born 27 November 1985) is a Chinese handball player who competed in the 2008 Summer Olympics.
