= Cui Liang (handballer) =

Chinese handball player (born 1983)

Cui Liang (Chinese: 崔亮; pinyin: Cuī Liàng; born 15 February 1983) is a Chinese handball player who competed in the 2008 Summer Olympics with his older brother Cui Lei.

Born in Shanxi Province, he studied at Jinzhong Sports School (晋中市体育运动学校) in Jinzhong, Shanxi. Though he was interested in basketball as a child, he switched to handball due to his brother Cui Lei's encouragement. The two brothers played handball together for the PLA Navy men's team. In 1999, Cui Liang joined the national men's handball team.

He competed at the 2002 Asian Games with Cui Lei, finishing in 7th place.

He also competed in the 2008 Summer Olympics with Cui Lei. The same month, it was announced that he would travel to Toulouse to participate in the local handball league; he had met the French men's handball team's head coach in 2007 at a handball competition in Suzhou.

In the lead-up to the 2018 Asian Games, he helped the Chinese women's handball team prepare for the event.
