= Park Jung-geu =

South Korean handball player (born 1983)

Personal information
- Nationality: South Korean
- Born: 2 November 1983 (age 42)
- Height: 192 cm (76 in)

Sport
- Sport: Handball
National team
- Years: Team
- –: South Korea
Medal record
Asian Championship
Bronze medal – third place	2018 South Korea

- Park Jung-geu
- Hangul: 박중규
- RR: Bak Junggyu
- MR: Pak Chunggyu

Park Jung-geu (born 2 November 1983) is a South Korean handball player who competed in the 2008 and 2012 Summer Olympics and the 2018 Asian Games
