= Lee Tea-young =

South Korean handball player (born 1977)

- Hangul: 이태영
- RR: I Taeyeong
- MR: I T'aeyŏng

Lee Tea-young (born 25 November 1977) is a Korean handball player who competed in the 2004 Summer Olympics and in the 2008 Summer Olympics.
