= List of Asian Games medalists in handball =

Asian Games medalists

This is the complete list of Asian Games medalists in handball from 1982 to 2022.

== Men ==
Games	Gold	Silver	Bronze
1982 New Delhi	China (CHN); Cai Jianguo; Deng Shanjun; Gao Zhongxin; Hu Weidong; Jin Bailan; Li Yingcai; Min Yue; Song Anwen; Sun Tie; Wang Xiong; Wang Yueting; Wei Heping; Wu Mingqun; Xie Jiyong	Japan (JPN); Seimei Gamo; Takashi Ikenoue; Yasuo Ikoma; Eiichi Ino; Hidetada Ito; Koji Matsui; Toru Nagano; Kiyoshi Nishiyama; Takahiro Ohata; Koji Saito; Yoshihiro Shiga; Shunji Takagi; Akira Tsugawa; Shinji Yamamoto	South Korea (KOR); Choi Jung-ho; Choi Tae-sup; Kang Duck-soo; Kang Jae-won; Kang Sae-yong; Kang Tae-koo; Kim Young-nam; Lee In-chul; Lee Sang-hyo; Lee Sang-woo; Lim Jae-sik; Lim Kyu-ha; Lim Young-chul; Oh Sae-hoon; Park Byung-hong; Shim Jung-man
1986 Seoul	South Korea (KOR); Bae Sang-ki; Choi Tae-sup; Hong Sung-woong; Hwang Yo-na; Kang Jae-won; Kim Jae-hwan; Koh Suk-chang; Lee Jong-kyung; Lee Sang-hyo; Lim Jin-suk; Lim Kyu-ha; Park Do-hun; Park Kwang-soo; Park Young-dae; Shin Young-suk; Yoon Tae-il	China (CHN); Deng Shanjun; Di Wenming; Dong Chao; Huang Ping; Jiang Shanming; Jun Baocheng; Meng Yousheng; Shan Shuo; Shao Zhixiong; Wang Feng; Wang Kan; Wei Heping; Xue Manyan; Yu Wei; Zhang Ming; Zhao Zhiwei	Japan (JPN); Kazumitsu Aso; Izumi Fujii; Osamu Ichikawa; Hidetada Ito; Kazuhiro Miyashita; Hiroki Naitou; Kiyoshi Nishiyama; Takahiro Ohata; Shinji Okuda; Yoshihiro Shiga; Shinichi Shudo; Koji Tachiki; Takashi Taguchi; Seiichi Takamura; Kenji Tamamura; Hiroshi Yanai
1990 Beijing	South Korea (KOR); Cho Bum-yun; Cho Chi-hyo; Cho Young-shin; Choi Suk-jae; Huh Young-sun; Kang Jae-won; Kim Jae-hwan; Lee Hak-myun; Lee Ki-ho; Lee Sang-sup; Lee Suik-houng; Moon Byung-wook; Park Do-hun; Shim Jae-hong; Sung Sun-yong; Yoon Kyung-shin	Japan (JPN); Tetsuo Akiyoshi; Yukihiro Hashimoto; Akiyoshi Kai; Takao Kawahara; Kazuhiro Miyashita; Tsuyoshi Nakayama; Shintaro Saito; Kiyoharu Sakamaki; Shinichi Shudo; Takashi Taguchi; Daiji Takeda; Hideo Takeda; Kenji Tamamura; Kazuhiko Uozumi; Toshiyuki Yamamura; Hiroshi Yanai	Saudi Arabia (KSA)
1994 Hiroshima	South Korea (KOR); Back Sang-suh; Cho Bum-yun; Cho Chi-hyo; Cho Young-shin; Huh Young-sun; Jung Joo-sung; Jung Kang-wook; Lee Hak-myun; Lee Ki-ho; Lee Min-woo; Lee Sang-sup; Lee Sok-wang; Lee Suik-houng; Lee Sun-soon; Moon Byung-wook; Yoon Kyung-shin	Japan (JPN); Takashi Fujii; Toshiyuki Gennai; Yukihiro Hashimoto; Koichi Hayashi; Noriaki Hotta; Koichi Inoue; Masanori Iwamoto; Sumitaka Miwa; Tsuyoshi Nakayama; Shinichi Shudo; Masahiro Sueoka; Masahiko Tanaka; Shigeru Tanaka; Eiji Tomimoto; Kazuhiko Uozumi; Hiroshi Watanabe	China (CHN); Guo Weidong; He Jun; Li Long; Liu Dedong; Lu Wanhong; Lü Hao; Ma Haiyong; Song Gang; Wang Xia; Wang Xindong; Wu Jian; Yan Tao; Zhang Hongjun; Zhang Jingmin
1998 Bangkok	South Korea (KOR); Back Sang-suh; Chang Joon-sung; Cho Bum-yun; Choi Hyun-ho; Han Kyung-tai; Hwangbo Sung-il; Jung Kang-wook; Kim Sung-heon; Lee Jae-woo; Lee Suik-houng; Lim Seong-sik; Paek Won-chul; Park Jung-jin; Shin Chang-ho; Yoon Kyung-min; Yoon Kyung-shin	Kuwait (KUW); Qaied Al-Adwani; Saad Al-Azemi; Abdulrazzaq Al-Boloushi; Yousef Al-Fadhli; Adel Al-Kahham; Ahmad Al-Kandari; Khaldoun Al-Khashti; Khalifa Al-Khashti; Khaled Al-Mulla; Raed Al-Zoabi; Abu Marzouq; Ali Murad; Mubarak Mushawih; Abdullah Saleh; Walid Salmin; Meshal Swailem	Japan (JPN); Takashi Fujii; Yukihiro Hashimoto; Kazuyuki Hihara; Yoshitaka Hiromasa; Masanori Iwamoto; Yuji Kakutani; Kiyoshi Kayaba; Toru Moriyama; Tsuyoshi Nakayama; Norihiro Sasaki; Masahiro Sueoka; Yuichi Sugiyama; Eiji Tomimoto; Toshihiro Tsubone; Shoichi Tsuji; Osamu Yamaguchi
2002 Busan	South Korea (KOR); Han Kyung-tai; Hwangbo Sung-il; Kim Tea-wan; Yoon Kyung-min; Jeong Seo-yoon; Lim Seong-sik; Chang Joon-sung; Nam Kwang-hyun; Yoon Kyung-shin; Park Min-chul; Lee Jun-hee; Kang Il-koo; Lee Jae-woo; Park Jung-jin; Lee Byung-ho; Paek Won-chul	Kuwait (KUW); Abdulrazzaq Al-Boloushi; Hasan Al-Shatti; Fahad Al-Azemi; Waleed Al-Hajraf; Husain Siwan; Ali Al-Haddad; Ahmad Al-Kandari; Abdullah Al-Theyab; Yousef Al-Fadhli; Salah Al-Marzouq; Abdulaziz Balous; Meshal Swailem; Mohammad Al-Fadhli; Saad Al-Azemi; Ali Murad; Faisal Siwan	Qatar (QAT); Nawaf Al-Suwaidi; Mohamed Saad Al-Saad; Rashid Al-Remaihi; Mohammed Al-Mansoori; Abdulla Saad Al-Saad; Adnan Al-Ali; Khalid Al-Sabea; Ahmed Saad Al-Saad; Mubarak Bilal Al-Ali; Yousef Ashoor; Nasser Saad Al-Saad; Mahmoud Ali Shayef; Badi Johar; Yousef Al-Maalem; Borhan Al-Turki; Meshaal Al-Sulaiti
2006 Doha	Kuwait (KUW); Torki Al-Khalidi; Bader Abbas; Abdulaziz Al-Zoabi; Faisal Al-Mutairi; Saleh Al-Jaimaz; Husain Siwan; Fahad Rabie; Abdullah Al-Theyab; Yousef Al-Fadhli; Ali Al-Haddad; Mahdi Al-Qallaf; Meshal Swailem; Hamad Al-Rashidi; Ali Al-Mithin; Saad Al-Azemi; Ali Murad	Qatar (QAT); Anas Al-Suweidan; Adnan Al-Ali; Khalid Al-Hashmi; Rashid Al-Remaihi; Samir Hashim; Abdulla Saad Al-Saad; Mohamed Bajawi; Mohammed Walid Ghazal; Ahmed Saad Al-Saad; Mubarak Bilal Al-Ali; Mohsin Yafai; Yousef Ashoor; Fawaz Al-Moadhadi; Khalid Al-Marri; Yousef Al-Maalem; Badi Johar	Iran (IRI); Iman Ehsannejad; Mohammad Reza Rajabi; Mohammad Reza Jafarnia; Hani Zamani; Masoud Zohrabi; Saeid Pourghasemi; Mostafa Sadati; Allahkaram Esteki; Farid Alimoradi; Alireza Rabie; Hossein Shahabi; Ali Akbar Khoshnevis; Rasoul Dehghani; Peyman Sadeghi; Hojjat Rahshenas
2010 Guangzhou	South Korea (KOR); Lee Chang-woo; Jeong Yi-kyeong; Sim Jae-bok; Park Kyung-suk; Kim Tea-wan; Jung Su-young; Park Jung-geu; Lee Sang-uk; Park Chan-young; Oh Yun-suk; Lee Tea-young; Kang Il-koo; Lee Jae-woo; Yu Dong-geun; Paek Won-chul; Yoon Kyung-shin	Iran (IRI); Abbas Asadzadeh; Milad Masaeli; Mohammad Reza Rajabi; Ehsan Abouei; Omid Sekenari; Sajjad Esteki; Masoud Zohrabi; Mostafa Sadati; Allahkaram Esteki; Javad Khorramipour; Erfan Saeidi; Mehrdad Samsami; Jalal Kiani; Saeid Barkhordari; Mohammad Mehdi Asgari; Mehdi Bijari	Japan (JPN); Katsuyuki Shinouchi; Kenji Toyoda; Makoto Suematsu; Hideyuki Murakami; Daisuke Miyazaki; Toru Takeda; Satoshi Fujita; Hidenori Kishigawa; Morihide Kaido; Toshihiro Tsubone; Kyosuke Tomita; Jun Mori; Masayuki Matsumura; Yoshiaki Nomura; Tetsuya Kadoyama; Shusaku Higashinagahama
2014 Incheon	Qatar (QAT); Hamdi Missaoui; Ameen Zakkar; Hassan Mabrouk; Bertrand Roiné; Rafael Capote; Abdulla Al-Karbi; Abdulrazzaq Murad; Yousuf Al-Abdulla; Eldar Memišević; Goran Stojanović; Borja Vidal; Kamalaldin Mallash; Youssef Benali; Hamad Madadi; Hadi Hamdoon; Mahmoud Hassaballa	South Korea (KOR); Jeong Yi-kyeong; Sim Jae-bok; Park Kyung-suk; Yu Dong-geun; Jung Su-young; Park Jung-geu; Lee Sang-uk; Lim Duk-jun; Oh Yun-suk; Lee Dong-myung; Hwang Do-yeop; Yoon Ci-yoel; Lee Hyeon-sik; Lee Eun-ho; Eom Hyo-won; Lee Chang-woo	Bahrain (BRN); Ali Abdulla Eid; Mahmood Abdulqader; Hasan Al-Fardan; Hasan Al-Samahiji; Jaafar Abdulqader; Sadiq Ali; Mahdi Madan; Mohamed Merza; Mohamed Abdulhusain; Mohamed Al-Maqabi; Jasim Radhi; Jasim Al-Salatna; Husain Ali; Ali Merza; Ali Abdulqader; Husain Al-Sayyad
2018 Jakarta–Palembang	Qatar (QAT); Rasheed Yusuff; Bertrand Roiné; Rafael Capote; Frankis Carol; Abdulrazzaq Murad; Danijel Šarić; Goran Stojanović; Firas Chaieb; Amine Guehis; Allaedine Berrached; Wajdi Sinen; Ahmad Madadi; Youssef Benali; Moustafa Heiba; Anis Zouaoui; Ameen Zakkar	Bahrain (BRN); Ali Merza; Hasan Al-Samahiji; Isa Khalaf; Mahmood Abdulqader; Mohamed Abdulredha; Mohamed Merza; Mohamed Abdulhusain; Bilal Basham; Hasan Madan; Husain Al-Baboor; Komail Mahfoodh; Jasim Al-Salatna; Ali Abdulqader; Hasan Al-Fardan; Mohamed Habib; Husain Al-Sayyad	South Korea (KOR); Jeong Yi-kyeong; Sim Jae-bok; Choi Beom-mun; Jung Su-young; Park Jung-geu; Jo Tae-hun; Jang Dong-hyun; Lee Hyeon-sik; Yoon Ci-yoel; Na Seung-do; Hwang Do-yeop; Kim Dong-cheol; Jeong Jae-wan; Lee Dong-myung; Ku Chang-eun; Lee Chang-woo
2022 Hangzhou	Qatar (QAT); Ahmad Madadi; Rafael Capote; Frankis Carol; Abdulrazzaq Murad; Bilal Lepenica; Eldar Memišević; Irhad Alihodžić; Amir Denguir; Abdelrahman Abdalla; Allaedine Berrached; Wajdi Sinen; Yassine Sami; Youssef Benali; Amine Guehis; Moustafa Heiba; Ameen Zakkar	Bahrain (BRN); Ali Abdulla Eid; Hasan Al-Samahiji; Mohamed Hameed Rabia; Hesham Ahmed; Qasim Qambar; Mohamed Abdulredha; Ahmed Jalal; Mohamed Merza; Mohamed Abdulhusain; Hasan Madan; Ali Merza; Hasan Merza; Mahdi Saad; Mohamed Habib; Mohamed Habib Naser; Husain Al-Sayyad	Kuwait (KUW); Abdullah Al-Khamees; Saleh Al-Musawi; Abdulaziz Al-Shammari; Fahad Slbokh; Mohammad Al-Sanea; Mohammad Al-Hendal; Mishaal Al-Harbi; Hasan Safar; Abdulaziz Naseeb; Fawaz Mubarak; Mohammad Qambar; Abdulaziz Salmeen; Abdulrahman Al-Shammari; Haider Dashti; Yousef Zayef; Mohammad Buyabes

== Women ==
Games	Gold	Silver	Bronze
1990 Beijing	South Korea (KOR); Baek In-suk; Cho Eun-hee; Jang Ri-ra; Jin Mi-suk; Kang Sun-kyung; Kim Tae-young; Kong Ju; Lee Im-suk; Lee Jong-sim; Lee Mi-young; Lim Mi-kyung; Oh Seong-ok; Park Jeong-lim; Park Young-sun; Song Ji-hyun; Suk Min-hee	China (CHN); Ceng Qiaozhen; Liu Siqing; Liu Yuying; Lu Guanghong; Shi Wei; Sun Xiulan; Wang Tao; Wang Wei; Wang Yuehao; Wu Xin; Xie Meiping; Xue Jinhua; Yue Liane; Zhai Chao; Zhang Hong; Zhang Limei	Chinese Taipei (TPE); Chan Wen-chin; Chang Mei-hung; Chang Shan-chi; Chao Wen-yu; Chen Chiu-ping; Chen Ya-hsueh; Chiang Yu-fen; Chou Chuan-chuan; Hsu Jui-yu; Hung Shu-fang; Lin Pei-ling; Lin Su-lin; Wang Shu-min; Wang Su-yueh; Wu Chun-chiu; Yang Shu-hua
1994 Hiroshima	South Korea (KOR); Baek Chang-suk; Cha Jae-kyung; Hong Jeong-ho; Huh Young-sook; Kim Eun-mi; Kim Hyun-ok; Kim Jeong-mi; Kim Mi-sim; Kim Rang; Ku Ae-kyung; Lee Ho-youn; Lee Sang-eun; Moon Hyang-ja; Nam Eun-young; Oh Seong-ok; Oh Yong-ran	Japan (JPN); Motoko Haji; Harumi Higa; Mio Ichiki; Emiko Kamide; Yuko Kawashima; Naoko Kida; Akiko Komatsu; Emi Matsumoto; Yukiko Matsushita; Midori Murayama; Takako Nishiguchi; Seiko Nishimura; Satoko Omata; Mineko Tanaka; Izumi Tanimoto; Yuka Yamakawa	China (CHN); Che Zhihong; Chen Haiyun; Cong Yanxia; Guo Dan; He Chengfen; Huang Shuping; Li Jianfang; Shi Shuiwen; Shi Wei; Wang Wei; Wang Weiqing; Wang Yuehao; Zhai Chao; Zhang Ruizhen; Zhu Lizhen
1998 Bangkok	South Korea (KOR); Cho Hee-jung; Han Sun-hee; Huh Soon-young; Kim Eun-gyung; Kim Eun-mi; Kim Hyang-ki; Kim Hyang-ok; Kim Hyun-ok; Kwag Hye-jeong; Lee Jae-kyung; Lee Nam-soo; Lee Sang-eun; Lee Yoon-jung; Oh Soon-yol; Oh Yong-ran; Yoon Sung-mi	North Korea (PRK); Im Hyon-ae; Ji Ok-ran; Kim Kyong-hui; Ku Yong-ae; Paek Myong; Pak Chun-bok; Ri Chung-sil; Ri Hui-yong; Ri Hyon-sil; Ri Mi; Rim Kil-hwa; Yu Myong-hui; Yun Kyong-ok	Japan (JPN); Akane Aoto; Mie Fujiura; Namiko Ikeda; Naomi Kobayashi; Mariko Komatsu; Yuko Kumagai; Mitsuko Kurachi; Emi Matsumoto; Naomi Miyamoto; Tomomi Nakamura; Masako Okidoi; Mineko Tanaka; Miyoko Tanaka; Yumiko Tanaka; Ayako Yamaguchi; Michiko Yamashita
2002 Busan	South Korea (KOR); Lee Nam-soo; Kim Hyang-ki; Huh Soon-young; Kim Eun-gyung; Jang So-hee; Kim Hyun-ok; Kim Cha-youn; Lee Seul-hee; Huh Young-sook; Moon Kyeong-ha; Kim Cheong-sim; Chung Eun-hee; Woo Sun-hee; Son Myung-hee; Myoung Bok-hee; Choi Im-jeong	Kazakhstan (KAZ); Olga Travnikova; Yelena Kozlova; Olga Zolina; Irina Borechko; Marina Buzmakova; Svetlana Grasmik; Lyazzat Kilibayeva; Olga Yegunova; Liliya Zubkova; Lyudmila Sidorenko; Natalya Kubrina; Irina Lang; Natalya Shapovalova; Irina Melnikova; Yuliya Puzanova; Olga Adzhiderskaya	China (CHN); Wang Xiaojiong; Zhai Chao; Liu Yun; Li Bing; Shi Wei; Li Yang; Chen Haiyun; Zhu Hongxia; Wu Yanan; Liu Xiaomei; Che Zhihong; Yu Geli; Zhao Ying; Li Weiwei; Li Xin
2006 Doha	South Korea (KOR); Woo Sun-hee; Yoon Hyun-kyung; Huh Soon-young; Lee Gong-joo; An Jung-hwa; Yu Ji-yeong; Kim Cha-youn; Huh Young-sook; Moon Kyeong-ha; Park Chung-hee; Kwon Geun-hae; Lee Min-hee; Myoung Bok-hee; Kang Ji-hey; Choi Im-jeong; Moon Pil-hee	Kazakhstan (KAZ); Olga Travnikova; Olga Adzhiderskaya; Marina Buzmakova; Irina Borechko; Marina Pikalova; Alexandra Yefimova; Lyazzat Kilibayeva; Yelena Kozlova; Gulnar Mendybayeva; Yelena Portova; Natalya Kubrina; Anastassiya Batuyeva; Yuliya Goncharova; Yevgeniya Nikolayeva; Natalya Yakovleva; Yana Vassilyeva	Japan (JPN); Sachiko Katsuda; Yuko Arihama; Mariko Komatsu; Kaori Onozawa; Akiko Kinjo; Hitomi Sakugawa; Tomoko Sakamoto; Aiko Hayafune; Kimiko Hida; Keiko Mizuno; Noriko Omae; Hisayo Taniguchi; Mami Tanaka; Kazusa Nagano; Eiko Yamada; Akie Uegaki
2010 Guangzhou	China (CHN); Xu Mo; Wei Qiuxiang; Ma Ling; Li Bing; Luan Zheng; Li Yao; Zhou Meiwei; Wang Shasha; An Ni; Huang Hong; Liu Xiaomei; Sun Mengying; Sha Zhengwen; Li Weiwei; Zhao Jiaqin; Yan Meizhu	Japan (JPN); Megumi Takahashi; Aimi Ito; Akie Uegaki; Akina Shinjo; Kaori Nakamura; Shio Fujii; Kumi Mori; Karina Maki; Hiromi Tashiro; Yuko Arihama; Kaoru Yokoshima; Mayuko Ishitate; Rika Wakamatsu; Kaori Fujima; Aiko Hayafune; Sayo Shiota	South Korea (KOR); Woo Sun-hee; Kim On-a; Huh Soon-young; Baek Seung-hee; Bae Min-hee; Kim Cha-youn; Yoon Hyun-kyung; Moon Kyeong-ha; Ryu Eun-hee; Nam Hyun-hwa; Lee Min-hee; Myoung Bok-hee; Kang Ji-hey; Jung Ji-hae; Moon Pil-hee; Lee Eun-bi
2014 Incheon	South Korea (KOR); Park Sae-young; Kim Seon-hwa; Jung Yu-ra; Won Seon-pil; Ryu Eun-hee; Park Mi-ra; Yoo Hyun-ji; Kim Jin-yi; Choi Su-min; Song Mi-young; Sim Hae-in; Jung Ji-hae; Kim On-a; Lee Eun-bi; Woo Sun-hee; Gwon Han-na	Japan (JPN); Kimiko Hida; Megumi Honda; Mikako Ishino; Arata Nishikiori; Kaoru Yokoshima; Chie Katsuren; Aya Yokoshima; Yui Sunami; Sato Shiroishi; Yuko Arihama; Mayuko Ishitate; Rino Aizawa; Kaori Fujima; Nozomi Hara; Shiori Nagata; Anri Matsumura	Kazakhstan (KAZ); Yevgeniya Tsupenkova; Rizagul Mukanova; Olga Tankina; Marina Pikalova; Viktoriya Kolotinskaya; Xeniya Volnukhina; Anastassiya Rodina; Yelena Suyazova; Tatyana Parfenova; Natalya Ilyina; Irina Alexandrova; Irina Danilova; Yelena Klimenko; Polina Mikhailova; Kristina Kapralova
2018 Jakarta–Palembang	South Korea (KOR); Park Sae-young; Kim Seon-hwa; Song Hai-rim; Shin Eun-joo; Kim On-a; Park Mi-ra; Yoo Hyun-ji; Kang Eun-hye; Choi Su-min; Han Mi-seul; Jung Ji-hae; Gim Bo-eun; Song Ji-eun; Lee Hyo-jin; Jung Yu-ra; Yu So-jeong	China (CHN); Lin Yanqun; Zhang Haixia; Li Xiaoqing; Wu Yin; Wu Nana; Yu Yuanyuan; Wang Haiye; Si Wen; Liu Xiaomei; Sha Zhengwen; Yang Jiao; Zhao Jiaqin; Yang Yurou; Li Yao; Qiao Ru; Lan Xiaoling	Japan (JPN); Kimiko Hida; Mika Nagata; Kaho Sunami; Sayo Shiota; Asuka Fujita; Aya Yokoshima; Minami Itano; Chie Katsuren; Hitomi Tada; Natsumi Akiyama; Nozomi Hara; Mana Ohyama; Shiori Nagata; Miyuki Terada; Tomomi Kawata; Mayuko Ishitate
2022 Hangzhou	Japan (JPN); Naoko Sahara; Miyako Hatsumi; Yumi Kitahara; Saki Hattori; Chikako Kasai; Atsuko Baba; Kaho Nakayama; Ayaka Omatsuzawa; Hikaru Matsumoto; Naho Saito; Natsuki Aizawa; Ayame Okada; Reina Dan; Kana Ozaki; Yuki Yoshidome; Sora Ishikawa	South Korea (KOR); Kim Seon-hwa; Song Ji-young; Shin Eun-joo; Kim Min-seo; Ryu Eun-hee; Jeong Jin-hui; Park Sae-young; Jo Su-yeon; Kang Eun-hye; Song Hye-soo; Lee Mi-gyeong; Kang Kyung-min; Kang Eun-seo; Yun Ye-jin; Gim Bo-eun; Park Jo-eun	China (CHN); Lu Chang; Zhang Haixia; Lin Yanqun; Tian Xiuxiu; Liu Chan; Li Xiaoqing; Zhou Mengxue; Hu Yunuo; Zhang Guisi; Yang Yurou; Zhuang Hongyan; Xin Yan; Gong Lei; Liu Xuedan; Jin Mengqing; Liu Yuting
