= Handball at the 2010 Asian Games =

- Venue: Huashi Gymnasium; Guanggong Gymnasium
- Date: 13–26 November 2010
- Competitors: 313 from 15 nations

Handball at the 2010 Asian Games was held in Guangzhou, Guangdong, China from November 13 to 26, 2010. In this tournament, 11 teams played in the men's competition, and 9 teams participated in the women's competition.

== Schedule ==
P	Preliminary round	C	Classification	½	Semifinals	F	Finals

Event↓/Date →	13th Sat	14th Sun	15th Mon	16th Tue	17th Wed	18th Thu	19th Fri	20th Sat	21st Sun	22nd Mon	23rd Tue	24th Wed	25th Thu	26th Fri
Men	P	P		P	P	P	P	P		C	½	C		F
Women						P	P	P	P	P	P		½	F

== Medalists ==
Event	Gold	Silver	Bronze
Men	South Korea; Lee Chang-woo; Jeong Yi-kyeong; Sim Jae-bok; Park Kyung-suk; Kim Tea-wan; Jung Su-young; Park Jung-geu; Lee Sang-uk; Park Chan-young; Oh Yun-suk; Lee Tea-young; Kang Il-koo; Lee Jae-woo; Yu Dong-geun; Paek Won-chul; Yoon Kyung-shin	Iran; Abbas Asadzadeh; Milad Masaeli; Mohammad Reza Rajabi; Ehsan Abouei; Omid Sekenari; Sajjad Esteki; Masoud Zohrabi; Mostafa Sadati; Allahkaram Esteki; Javad Khorramipour; Erfan Saeidi; Mehrdad Samsami; Jalal Kiani; Saeid Barkhordari; Mohammad Mehdi Asgari; Mehdi Bijari	Japan; Katsuyuki Shinouchi; Kenji Toyoda; Makoto Suematsu; Hideyuki Murakami; Daisuke Miyazaki; Toru Takeda; Satoshi Fujita; Hidenori Kishigawa; Morihide Kaido; Toshihiro Tsubone; Kyosuke Tomita; Jun Mori; Masayuki Matsumura; Yoshiaki Nomura; Tetsuya Kadoyama; Shusaku Higashinagahama
Women	China; Xu Mo; Wei Qiuxiang; Ma Ling; Li Bing; Luan Zheng; Li Yao; Zhou Meiwei; Wang Shasha; An Ni; Huang Hong; Liu Xiaomei; Sun Mengying; Sha Zhengwen; Li Weiwei; Zhao Jiaqin; Yan Meizhu	Japan; Megumi Takahashi; Aimi Ito; Akie Uegaki; Akina Shinjo; Kaori Nakamura; Shio Fujii; Kumi Mori; Karina Maki; Hiromi Tashiro; Yuko Arihama; Kaoru Yokoshima; Mayuko Ishitate; Rika Wakamatsu; Kaori Fujima; Aiko Hayafune; Sayo Shiota	South Korea; Woo Sun-hee; Kim On-a; Huh Soon-young; Baek Seung-hee; Bae Min-hee; Kim Cha-youn; Yoon Hyun-kyung; Moon Kyeong-ha; Ryu Eun-hee; Nam Hyun-hwa; Lee Min-hee; Myoung Bok-hee; Kang Ji-hey; Jung Ji-hae; Moon Pil-hee; Lee Eun-bi

== Medal table ==
Rank	Nation	Gold	Silver	Bronze	Total
1	South Korea (KOR)	1	0	1	2
2	China (CHN)	1	0	0	1
3	Japan (JPN)	0	1	1	2
4	Iran (IRI)	0	1	0	1
Totals (4 entries)		2	2	2	6

== Draw ==
The draw ceremony for the team sports was held on 7 October 2010 at Guangzhou. The teams were seeded based on their final ranking at the 2006 Asian Games.

=== Men ===
Group A

- Qatar (2)
- China (Host)
- Japan (6)
- Saudi Arabia (8)
- India (12)
- Mongolia

Group B

- Athletes from Kuwait (1)
- Iran (3)
- South Korea (4)
- Bahrain (7)
- Hong Kong (13)

=== Women ===
Group A

- South Korea (1)
- Chinese Taipei (5)
- Thailand (7)
- Qatar

Group B

- Japan (3)
- China (Host)
- India (8)
- North Korea

Kazakhstan was later added to Group A.

== Final standing ==
=== Men ===
Rank	Team	Pld	W	D	L
1st place, gold medalist(s)	South Korea	6	6	0	0
2nd place, silver medalist(s)	Iran	6	4	0	2
3rd place, bronze medalist(s)	Japan	7	5	0	2
4	Saudi Arabia	7	3	1	3
5	Qatar	6	4	1	1
6	Bahrain	5	2	0	3
7	China	6	3	2	1
8	Athletes from Kuwait	5	1	0	4
9	India	6	2	0	4
10	Hong Kong	5	0	0	5
11	Mongolia	5	0	0	5

=== Women ===
Rank	Team	Pld	W	D	L
1st place, gold medalist(s)	China	5	5	0	0
2nd place, silver medalist(s)	Japan	5	3	0	2
3rd place, bronze medalist(s)	South Korea	6	5	0	1
4	Kazakhstan	6	3	0	3
5	North Korea	4	2	0	2
6	Chinese Taipei	5	2	0	3
7	Thailand	5	2	0	3
8	India	4	0	0	4
9	Qatar	4	0	0	4
