= Handball at the 2002 Asian Games =

- Venue: Changwon Gymnasium
- Date: 30 September – 13 October 2002
- Competitors: 214 from 11 nations

The Handball events at the 2002 Asian Games were held in South Korea between 30 September and 13 October 2002. The competition took place at the Changwon Gymnasium.

== Schedule ==
●	Round	●	Last round	P	Preliminary round	C	Classification	½	Semifinals	F	Finals

Event↓/Date →	30th Mon	1st Tue	2nd Wed	3rd Thu	4th Fri	5th Sat	6th Sun	7th Mon	8th Tue	9th Wed	10th Thu	11th Fri	12th Sat	13th Sun
Men	P	P	P	P	P	P	P	P	P	P		½	C	F
Women		●		●		●		●		●		●	●	

== Medalists ==
Event	Gold	Silver	Bronze
Men	South Korea; Han Kyung-tai; Hwangbo Sung-il; Kim Tea-wan; Yoon Kyung-min; Jeong Seo-yoon; Lim Seong-sik; Chang Joon-sung; Nam Kwang-hyun; Yoon Kyung-shin; Park Min-chul; Lee Jun-hee; Kang Il-koo; Lee Jae-woo; Park Jung-jin; Lee Byung-ho; Paek Won-chul	Kuwait; Abdulrazzaq Al-Boloushi; Hasan Al-Shatti; Fahad Al-Azemi; Waleed Al-Hajraf; Husain Siwan; Ali Al-Haddad; Ahmad Al-Kandari; Abdullah Al-Theyab; Yousef Al-Fadhli; Salah Al-Marzouq; Abdulaziz Balous; Meshal Swailem; Mohammad Al-Fadhli; Saad Al-Azemi; Ali Murad; Faisal Siwan	Qatar; Nawaf Al-Suwaidi; Mohamed Saad Al-Saad; Rashid Al-Remaihi; Mohammed Al-Mansoori; Abdulla Saad Al-Saad; Adnan Al-Ali; Khalid Al-Sabea; Ahmed Saad Al-Saad; Mubarak Bilal Al-Ali; Yousef Ashoor; Nasser Saad Al-Saad; Mahmoud Ali Shayef; Badi Johar; Yousef Al-Maalem; Borhan Al-Turki; Meshaal Al-Sulaiti
Women	South Korea; Lee Nam-soo; Kim Hyang-ki; Huh Soon-young; Kim Eun-gyung; Jang So-hee; Kim Hyun-ok; Kim Cha-youn; Lee Seul-hee; Huh Young-sook; Moon Kyeong-ha; Kim Cheong-sim; Chung Eun-hee; Woo Sun-hee; Son Myung-hee; Myoung Bok-hee; Choi Im-jeong	Kazakhstan; Olga Travnikova; Yelena Kozlova; Olga Zolina; Irina Borechko; Marina Buzmakova; Svetlana Grasmik; Lyazzat Kilibayeva; Olga Yegunova; Liliya Zubkova; Lyudmila Sidorenko; Natalya Kubrina; Irina Lang; Natalya Shapovalova; Irina Melnikova; Yuliya Puzanova; Olga Adzhiderskaya	China; Wang Xiaojiong; Zhai Chao; Liu Yun; Li Bing; Shi Wei; Li Yang; Chen Haiyun; Zhu Hongxia; Wu Yanan; Liu Xiaomei; Che Zhihong; Yu Geli; Zhao Ying; Li Weiwei; Li Xin

== Medal table ==
Rank	Nation	Gold	Silver	Bronze	Total
1	South Korea (KOR)	2	0	0	2
2	Kazakhstan (KAZ)	0	1	0	1
2	Kuwait (KUW)	0	1	0	1
4	China (CHN)	0	0	1	1
4	Qatar (QAT)	0	0	1	1
Totals (5 entries)		2	2	2	6

== Draw ==
The teams were seeded based on their final ranking at the 1998 Asian Games. The women were played in round robin format.

Group A

- South Korea (1)
- Japan (3)
- China (6)
- Bahrain
- Mongolia

Group B

- Kuwait (2)
- United Arab Emirates (5)
- Qatar (7)
- Chinese Taipei
- ~~Uzbekistan~~*

* Withdrew.

== Final standing ==
=== Men ===
Rank	Team	Pld	W	D	L
1st place, gold medalist(s)	South Korea	6	6	0	0
2nd place, silver medalist(s)	Kuwait	5	3	1	1
3rd place, bronze medalist(s)	Qatar	5	3	0	2
4	Japan	6	3	0	3
5	Chinese Taipei	4	2	0	2
6	Bahrain	5	2	0	3
7	China	5	2	0	3
8	United Arab Emirates	4	0	1	3
9	Mongolia	4	0	0	4

=== Women ===
Rank	Team	Pld	W	D	L
1st place, gold medalist(s)	South Korea	4	4	0	0
2nd place, silver medalist(s)	Kazakhstan	4	2	1	1
3rd place, bronze medalist(s)	China	4	1	2	1
4	Japan	4	0	2	2
5	North Korea	4	0	1	3
