= Handball at the 1998 Asian Games =

- Venue: Thammasat Gymnasium 3 Srinakharinwirot University
- Date: 7–16 December 1998
- Nations: 9

The Handball events at the 1998 Asian Games were held in Bangkok, Thailand between December 7 and December 16, 1998. South Korea dominated the competition by winning both gold medals.

== Schedule ==
| ● | Round | ● | Last round | P | Preliminary round | C | Classification | ½ | Semifinals | F | Finals |

| Event↓/Date → | 7th Mon | 8th Tue | 9th Wed | 10th Thu | 11th Fri | 12th Sat | 13th Sun | 14th Mon | 15th Tue | 16th Wed |
|---|---|---|---|---|---|---|---|---|---|---|
| Men | P | P | P | P | P | P | C | ½ | | F |
| Women | | | ● | ● | ● | ● | | ● | | |

== Medalists ==
| Event | Gold | Silver | Bronze |
|---|---|---|---|
| Men | South Korea; Back Sang-suh; Chang Joon-sung; Cho Bum-yun; Choi Hyun-ho; Han Kyung-tai; Hwangbo Sung-il; Jung Kang-wook; Kim Sung-heon; Lee Jae-woo; Lee Suik-houng; Lim Seong-sik; Paek Won-chul; Park Jung-jin; Shin Chang-ho; Yoon Kyung-min; Yoon Kyung-shin | Kuwait; Qaied Al-Adwani; Saad Al-Azemi; Abdulrazzaq Al-Boloushi; Yousef Al-Fadhli; Adel Al-Kahham; Ahmad Al-Kandari; Khaldoun Al-Khashti; Khalifa Al-Khashti; Khaled Al-Mulla; Raed Al-Zoabi; Abu Marzouq; Ali Murad; Mubarak Mushawih; Abdullah Saleh; Walid Salmin; Meshal Swailem | Japan; Takashi Fujii; Yukihiro Hashimoto; Kazuyuki Hihara; Yoshitaka Hiromasa; Masanori Iwamoto; Yuji Kakutani; Kiyoshi Kayaba; Toru Moriyama; Tsuyoshi Nakayama; Norihiro Sasaki; Masahiro Sueoka; Yuichi Sugiyama; Eiji Tomimoto; Toshihiro Tsubone; Shoichi Tsuji; Osamu Yamaguchi |
| Women | South Korea; Cho Hee-jung; Han Sun-hee; Huh Soon-young; Kim Eun-gyung; Kim Eun-mi; Kim Hyang-ki; Kim Hyang-ok; Kim Hyun-ok; Kwag Hye-jeong; Lee Jae-kyung; Lee Nam-soo; Lee Sang-eun; Lee Yoon-jung; Oh Soon-yol; Oh Yong-ran; Yoon Sung-mi | North Korea; Im Hyon-ae; Ji Ok-ran; Kim Kyong-hui; Ku Yong-ae; Paek Myong; Pak Chun-bok; Ri Chung-sil; Ri Hui-yong; Ri Hyon-sil; Ri Mi; Rim Kil-hwa; Yu Myong-hui; Yun Kyong-ok | Japan; Akane Aoto; Mie Fujiura; Namiko Ikeda; Naomi Kobayashi; Mariko Komatsu; Yuko Kumagai; Mitsuko Kurachi; Emi Matsumoto; Naomi Miyamoto; Tomomi Nakamura; Masako Okidoi; Mineko Tanaka; Miyoko Tanaka; Yumiko Tanaka; Ayako Yamaguchi; Michiko Yamashita |

== Medal table ==
| Rank | Nation | Gold | Silver | Bronze | Total |
|---|---|---|---|---|---|
| 1 | South Korea (KOR) | 2 | 0 | 0 | 2 |
| 2 | Kuwait (KUW) | 0 | 1 | 0 | 1 |
| 2 | North Korea (PRK) | 0 | 1 | 0 | 1 |
| 4 | Japan (JPN) | 0 | 0 | 2 | 2 |
| Totals (4 entries) | | 2 | 2 | 2 | 6 |

== Draw ==
Group A

- Kuwait
- Thailand
- Japan
- United Arab Emirates

Group B

- South Korea
- Qatar
- Iran
- China

== Final standing ==
=== Men ===
| Rank | Team | Pld | W | D | L |
|---|---|---|---|---|---|
| 1st place, gold medalist(s) | South Korea | 5 | 5 | 0 | 0 |
| 2nd place, silver medalist(s) | Kuwait | 5 | 3 | 1 | 1 |
| 3rd place, bronze medalist(s) | Japan | 5 | 3 | 1 | 1 |
| 4 | Iran | 5 | 2 | 0 | 3 |
| 5 | United Arab Emirates | 4 | 2 | 0 | 2 |
| 6 | China | 4 | 1 | 0 | 3 |
| 7 | Qatar | 4 | 1 | 0 | 3 |
| 8 | Thailand | 4 | 0 | 0 | 4 |

=== Women ===
| Rank | Team | Pld | W | D | L |
|---|---|---|---|---|---|
| 1st place, gold medalist(s) | South Korea | 5 | 5 | 0 | 0 |
| 2nd place, silver medalist(s) | North Korea | 5 | 4 | 0 | 1 |
| 3rd place, bronze medalist(s) | Japan | 5 | 2 | 1 | 2 |
| 4 | China | 5 | 2 | 1 | 2 |
| 5 | Kazakhstan | 5 | 1 | 0 | 4 |
| 6 | Thailand | 5 | 0 | 0 | 5 |
