= Handball at the 1994 Asian Games =

Handball competition

- Venue: Higashiku Sports Center
- Date: 5–14 October 1994
- Nations: 6

The Handball events at the 1994 Asian Games were held at the Higashiku Sports Center, Hiroshima, Japan between 5 October 1994 and 14 October 1994.

== Schedule ==
●	Round	●	Last round

Event↓/Date →	5th Wed	6th Thu	7th Fri	8th Sat	9th Sun	10th Mon	11th Tue	12th Wed	13th Thu	14th Fri
Men		●		●		●		●		●
Women	●		●		●		●		●	

== Medalists ==
Event	Gold	Silver	Bronze
Men	South Korea; Back Sang-suh; Cho Bum-yun; Cho Chi-hyo; Cho Young-shin; Huh Young-sun; Jung Joo-sung; Jung Kang-wook; Lee Hak-myun; Lee Ki-ho; Lee Min-woo; Lee Sang-sup; Lee Sok-wang; Lee Suik-houng; Lee Sun-soon; Moon Byung-wook; Yoon Kyung-shin	Japan; Takashi Fujii; Toshiyuki Gennai; Yukihiro Hashimoto; Koichi Hayashi; Noriaki Hotta; Koichi Inoue; Masanori Iwamoto; Sumitaka Miwa; Tsuyoshi Nakayama; Shinichi Shudo; Masahiro Sueoka; Masahiko Tanaka; Shigeru Tanaka; Eiji Tomimoto; Kazuhiko Uozumi; Hiroshi Watanabe	China; Guo Weidong; He Jun; Li Long; Liu Dedong; Lu Wanhong; Lü Hao; Ma Haiyong; Song Gang; Wang Xia; Wang Xindong; Wu Jian; Yan Tao; Zhang Hongjun; Zhang Jingmin
Women	South Korea; Baek Chang-suk; Cha Jae-kyung; Hong Jeong-ho; Huh Young-sook; Kim Eun-mi; Kim Hyun-ok; Kim Jeong-mi; Kim Mi-sim; Kim Rang; Ku Ae-kyung; Lee Ho-youn; Lee Sang-eun; Moon Hyang-ja; Nam Eun-young; Oh Seong-ok; Oh Yong-ran	Japan; Motoko Haji; Harumi Higa; Mio Ichiki; Emiko Kamide; Yuko Kawashima; Naoko Kida; Akiko Komatsu; Emi Matsumoto; Yukiko Matsushita; Midori Murayama; Takako Nishiguchi; Seiko Nishimura; Satoko Omata; Mineko Tanaka; Izumi Tanimoto; Yuka Yamakawa	China; Che Zhihong; Chen Haiyun; Cong Yanxia; Guo Dan; He Chengfen; Huang Shuping; Li Jianfang; Shi Shuiwen; Shi Wei; Wang Wei; Wang Weiqing; Wang Yuehao; Zhai Chao; Zhang Ruizhen; Zhu Lizhen

== Medal table ==
Rank	Nation	Gold	Silver	Bronze	Total
1	South Korea (KOR)	2	0	0	2
2	Japan (JPN)	0	2	0	2
3	China (CHN)	0	0	2	2
Totals (3 entries)		2	2	2	6

== Final standing ==
=== Men ===
Rank	Team	Pld	W	D	L
1st place, gold medalist(s)	South Korea	4	3	1	0
2nd place, silver medalist(s)	Japan	4	2	0	2
3rd place, bronze medalist(s)	China	4	2	0	2
4	Kuwait	4	1	1	2
5	Saudi Arabia	4	1	0	3

=== Women ===
Rank	Team	Pld	W	D	L
1st place, gold medalist(s)	South Korea	3	3	0	0
2nd place, silver medalist(s)	Japan	3	2	0	1
3rd place, bronze medalist(s)	China	3	1	0	2
4	Kazakhstan	3	0	0	3
