= Handball at the 1990 Asian Games =

- Venue: Beijiao Gymnasium
- Date: 26 September – 5 October 1990
- Nations: 8

The Handball events at the 1990 Asian Games were held in Beijing, China between September 26 and October 5, 1990.

South Korea won both men's and women's gold medals in round robin competitions.

== Medalists ==
Event	Gold	Silver	Bronze
Men	South Korea; Cho Bum-yun; Cho Chi-hyo; Cho Young-shin; Choi Suk-jae; Huh Young-sun; Kang Jae-won; Kim Jae-hwan; Lee Hak-myun; Lee Ki-ho; Lee Sang-sup; Lee Suik-houng; Moon Byung-wook; Park Do-hun; Shim Jae-hong; Sung Sun-yong; Yoon Kyung-shin	Japan; Tetsuo Akiyoshi; Yukihiro Hashimoto; Akiyoshi Kai; Takao Kawahara; Kazuhiro Miyashita; Tsuyoshi Nakayama; Shintaro Saito; Kiyoharu Sakamaki; Shinichi Shudo; Takashi Taguchi; Daiji Takeda; Hideo Takeda; Kenji Tamamura; Kazuhiko Uozumi; Toshiyuki Yamamura; Hiroshi Yanai	Saudi Arabia
Women	South Korea; Baek In-suk; Cho Eun-hee; Jang Ri-ra; Jin Mi-suk; Kang Sun-kyung; Kim Tae-young; Kong Ju; Lee Im-suk; Lee Jong-sim; Lee Mi-young; Lim Mi-kyung; Oh Seong-ok; Park Jeong-lim; Park Young-sun; Song Ji-hyun; Suk Min-hee	China; Ceng Qiaozhen; Liu Siqing; Liu Yuying; Lu Guanghong; Shi Wei; Sun Xiulan; Wang Tao; Wang Wei; Wang Yuehao; Wu Xin; Xie Meiping; Xue Jinhua; Yue Liane; Zhai Chao; Zhang Hong; Zhang Limei	Chinese Taipei; Chan Wen-chin; Chang Mei-hung; Chang Shan-chi; Chao Wen-yu; Chen Chiu-ping; Chen Ya-hsueh; Chiang Yu-fen; Chou Chuan-chuan; Hsu Jui-yu; Hung Shu-fang; Lin Pei-ling; Lin Su-lin; Wang Shu-min; Wang Su-yueh; Wu Chun-chiu; Yang Shu-hua

== Medal table ==
Rank	Nation	Gold	Silver	Bronze	Total
1	South Korea (KOR)	2	0	0	2
2	China (CHN)	0	1	0	1
2	Japan (JPN)	0	1	0	1
4	Chinese Taipei (TPE)	0	0	1	1
4	Saudi Arabia (KSA)	0	0	1	1
Totals (5 entries)		2	2	2	6

== Final standing ==
=== Men ===
Rank	Team	Pld	W	D	L
1st place, gold medalist(s)	South Korea	5	5	0	0
2nd place, silver medalist(s)	Japan	5	4	0	1
3rd place, bronze medalist(s)	Saudi Arabia	5	3	0	2
4	China	5	2	0	3
5	North Korea	5	1	0	4
6	United Arab Emirates	5	0	0	5

=== Women ===
Rank	Team	Pld	W	D	L
1st place, gold medalist(s)	South Korea	5	5	0	0
2nd place, silver medalist(s)	China	5	4	0	1
3rd place, bronze medalist(s)	Chinese Taipei	5	2	1	2
4	North Korea	5	2	0	3
5	Japan	5	1	1	3
6	Hong Kong	5	0	0	5
