= Handball at the 1986 Asian Games =

- Venue: Suwon Gymnasium
- Date: 23–28 September 1986
- Nations: 6

The Handball events at the 1986 Asian Games were held in South Korea between September 23 and September 28, 1986. The competition included only men's event.

South Korea won the gold medal in a round robin competition, China finished second and won the silver medal while Japan won the bronze medal after beating Kuwait, Iran and Hong Kong.

== Medalists ==
Event	Gold	Silver	Bronze
Men	South Korea; Bae Sang-ki; Choi Tae-sup; Hong Sung-woong; Hwang Yo-na; Kang Jae-won; Kim Jae-hwan; Koh Suk-chang; Lee Jong-kyung; Lee Sang-hyo; Lim Jin-suk; Lim Kyu-ha; Park Do-hun; Park Kwang-soo; Park Young-dae; Shin Young-suk; Yoon Tae-il	China; Deng Shanjun; Di Wenming; Dong Chao; Huang Ping; Jiang Shanming; Jun Baocheng; Meng Yousheng; Shan Shuo; Shao Zhixiong; Wang Feng; Wang Kan; Wei Heping; Xue Manyan; Yu Wei; Zhang Ming; Zhao Zhiwei	Japan; Kazumitsu Aso; Izumi Fujii; Osamu Ichikawa; Hidetada Ito; Kazuhiro Miyashita; Hiroki Naitou; Kiyoshi Nishiyama; Takahiro Ohata; Shinji Okuda; Yoshihiro Shiga; Shinichi Shudo; Koji Tachiki; Takashi Taguchi; Seiichi Takamura; Kenji Tamamura; Hiroshi Yanai

== Results ==
Pos	Team	Pld	W	D	L	GF	GA	GD	Pts
1	South Korea	5	5	0	0	204	106	+98	10
2	China	5	4	0	1	151	114	+37	8
3	Japan	5	3	0	2	147	116	+31	6
4	Kuwait	5	2	0	3	163	124	+39	4
5	Iran	5	1	0	4	90	185	−95	2
6	Hong Kong	5	0	0	5	68	178	−110	0

Source: Results

23 September	Japan	38–16	Iran	Suwon Gymnasium, Suwon

23 September	South Korea	45–10	Hong Kong	Suwon Gymnasium, Suwon

23 September	China	28–22	Kuwait	Suwon Gymnasium, Suwon

24 September	South Korea	35–29	Kuwait	Suwon Gymnasium, Suwon

24 September	China	35–11	Iran	Suwon Gymnasium, Suwon

24 September	Japan	33–10	Hong Kong	Suwon Gymnasium, Suwon

25 September	China	34–16	Hong Kong	Suwon Gymnasium, Suwon

25 September	Kuwait	46–24	Iran	Suwon Gymnasium, Suwon

25 September	South Korea	38–26	Japan	Suwon Gymnasium, Suwon

27 September	Kuwait	44–14	Hong Kong	Suwon Gymnasium, Suwon

27 September	China	30–27	Japan	Suwon Gymnasium, Suwon

27 September	South Korea	48–17	Iran	Suwon Gymnasium, Suwon

28 September	Iran	22–18	Hong Kong	Suwon Gymnasium, Suwon

28 September	Japan	23–22	Kuwait	Suwon Gymnasium, Suwon

28 September	South Korea	38–24	China	Suwon Gymnasium, Suwon

== Final standing ==
Rank	Team	Pld	W	D	L
1st place, gold medalist(s)	South Korea	5	5	0	0
2nd place, silver medalist(s)	China	5	4	0	1
3rd place, bronze medalist(s)	Japan	5	3	0	2
4	Kuwait	5	2	0	3
5	Iran	5	1	0	4
6	Hong Kong	5	0	0	5
