= Yoon Kyung-shin =

South Korean handball player (born 1973)

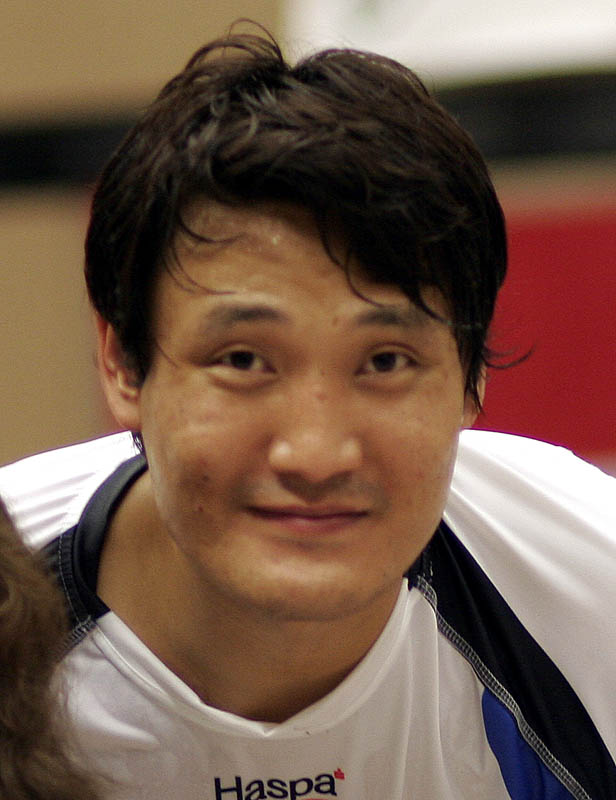
- Yoon with HSV Hamburg in 2007

Personal information
- Nationality: South Korean
- Born: 7 July 1973 (age 53) Seoul, South Korea
- Height: 2.03 m (6 ft 8 in)

Sport
- Sport: Handball
- Position: Right back
- Current club: Doosan Handball (manager)

Youth career
- Years: Team
- –: Kyung Hee University

Senior clubs
- Years: Team
- 1996–2006: VfL Gummersbach
- 2006–2008: HSV Hamburg
- 2008–2011: Doosan Handball
National team
- Years: Team
- 1990–2012: South Korea

Teams managed
- 2013–: Doosan Handball
- 2015–2016: South Korea
Medal record
Representing South Korea
Men's handball
Asian Games
Gold medal – first place	1990 Beijing
Gold medal – first place	1994 Hiroshima
Gold medal – first place	1998 Bangkok
Gold medal – first place	2002 Busan
Gold medal – first place	2010 Guangzhou
Asian Championship
Gold medal – first place	1993 Manama
Gold medal – first place	2000 Kumamoto
Gold medal – first place	2010 Beirut
Gold medal – first place	2012 Jeddah
Silver medal – second place	1995 Kuwait City

- Yoon Kyung-shin
- Hangul: 윤경신
- Hanja: 尹京信
- RR: Yun Gyeongsin
- MR: Yun Kyŏngsin

Yoon Kyung-shin (Korean: 윤경신; born 7 July 1973) is a South Korean handball manager and former player.

== Playing career ==
Yoon Kyung-shin played in the German league Handball-Bundesliga through his outstanding performances in World Championships. He played for VfL Gummersbach from 1996 to 2006, and for HSV Hamburg from 2006 to 2008. He became the top goalscorer of the Bundesliga seven times, and is currently the second highest scoring player of Bundesliga with 2,905 goals. He was also voted the World Player of the Year by the International Handball Federation (IHF) in 2001.

He played more than 260 games for the South Korea national handball team, and was top goalscorer at three World Championships and one Summer Olympics. At the 1995 World Championship he broke the record for most non-penalty goals at a world championship with 70. He was South Korean flag bearer at the 2012 Summer Olympics.

== Honours ==
=== Player ===
HSV Hamburg

- DHB-Supercup: 2006
- EHF Cup Winners' Cup: 2006–07

Doosan Handball

- Handball Korea League: 2011

South Korea

- Asian Games: 1990, 1994, 1998, 2002, 2010
- Asian Championship: 1993, 2000, 2010, 2012

Individual

- IHF World Player of the Year: 2001
- Summer Olympics top goalscorer: 2004
- World Championship top goalscorer: 1993, 1995, 1997
- World Championship All-Star Team: 1995, 2001
- Handball-Bundesliga top goalscorer: 1996–97, 1998–99, 1999–2000, 2000–01, 2001–02, 2003–04, 2006–07
- EHF Cup Winners' Cup top goalscorer: 2006–07

=== Manager ===
Doosan Handball

- Handball Korea League: 2013, 2015, 2016, 2017, 2018–19, 2019–20

Individual

- Handball Korea League Best Manager: 2013, 2015, 2016, 2017, 2018–19, 2019–20

== Personal ==
His younger brother Yoon Kyung-min was also a handball player.

Olympic Games
Preceded by Jang Sung-ho	Flagbearer for South Korea; London 2012	Succeeded by Gu Bon-gil
