= Hidetada (given name) =

- Gender: Male

Origin
- Origin: Japanese
- Meaning: Different meanings depending on the kanji used

Hidetada (written: 秀忠, 秀匡 or 英忠) is a masculine Japanese given name. Notable people with the name include:

- Hidetada Ito (井藤 英忠; born 1959), Japanese handball player
- Kuroda Hidetada (黒田 秀忠; 1492–1546), Japanese samurai
- Tokugawa Hidetada (徳川 秀忠; 1579–1632), Japanese shōgun
- Hidetada Yamagishi (山岸 秀匡; born 1973), Japanese bodybuilder
