= Kim Hyun-ok =

Kim Hyun-ok may refer to:

- Kim Hyun-ok (politician)
- Kim Hyun-ok (handballer)
