= Lee Ki-ho =

Lee Ki-ho (Korean: 이기호; RR: I Giho) may refer to:

- Lee Ki-ho (writer) (Hanja: 李起昊, born 1972), South Korean author
- Lee Ki-ho (handballer) (born 1970), South Korean handballer
- Lee Ki-ho (speed skater) (Hanja: 李基昊, born 1984), South Korean speed skater
