= Yokoshima =

Yokoshima (written: 横嶋) is a Japanese surname. Notable people with the surname include:

- Aya Yokoshima (横嶋 彩, born 1990), Japanese handball player
- Hisashi Yokoshima (born 1957), Japanese racing driver
- Kaoru Yokoshima (born 1985), Japanese handball player
- Yoshikazu Yokoshima (born 1952), Japanese golfer
