= Handball at the 1994 Asian Games – Men's tournament =

Men at the 1994 Asian Games
- Venue: Higashiku Sports Center
- Date: 6–14 October 1994
- Nations: 5

Medalists
gold medal	South Korea
silver medal	Japan
bronze medal	China

Men's handball at the 1994 Asian Games was held in Higashiku Sports Center, Hiroshima from October 6 to October 14, 1994.

== Results ==
All times are Japan Standard Time (UTC+09:00)

Pos	Team	Pld	W	D	L	GF	GA	GD	Pts
1	South Korea	4	3	1	0	106	72	+34	7
2	Japan	4	2	0	2	81	80	+1	4 (Note: Head-to-head result: JPN 18–17 CHN.)
3	China	4	2	0	2	78	90	−12	4
4	Kuwait	4	1	1	2	82	85	−3	3
5	Saudi Arabia	4	1	0	3	76	96	−20	2

Source: Results
Notes:

6 October; 9:00	South Korea	26–12	Saudi Arabia	Higashiku Sports Center, Hiroshima
6 October; 9:00		(8–6)		Higashiku Sports Center, Hiroshima

6 October; 18:30	Kuwait	20–17	Japan	Higashiku Sports Center, Hiroshima
6 October; 18:30		(4–8)		Higashiku Sports Center, Hiroshima

8 October; 15:00	China	17–18	Japan	Higashiku Sports Center, Hiroshima
8 October; 15:00		(9–9)		Higashiku Sports Center, Hiroshima

8 October; 16:30	South Korea	22–22	Kuwait	Higashiku Sports Center, Hiroshima
8 October; 16:30		(11–10)		Higashiku Sports Center, Hiroshima

10 October; 15:00	Saudi Arabia	25–22	Kuwait	Higashiku Sports Center, Hiroshima
10 October; 15:00		(10–13)		Higashiku Sports Center, Hiroshima

10 October; 16:30	China	17–32	South Korea	Higashiku Sports Center, Hiroshima
10 October; 16:30		(8–16)		Higashiku Sports Center, Hiroshima

12 October; 17:00	Kuwait	18–21	China	Higashiku Sports Center, Hiroshima
12 October; 17:00		(8–10)		Higashiku Sports Center, Hiroshima

12 October; 18:30	Japan	25–17	Saudi Arabia	Higashiku Sports Center, Hiroshima
12 October; 18:30		(14–7)		Higashiku Sports Center, Hiroshima

14 October; 15:00	Saudi Arabia	22–23	China	Higashiku Sports Center, Hiroshima
14 October; 15:00		(9–13)		Higashiku Sports Center, Hiroshima

14 October; 16:30	Japan	21–26	South Korea	Higashiku Sports Center, Hiroshima
14 October; 16:30		(9–10)		Higashiku Sports Center, Hiroshima

== Final standing ==
Rank	Team	Pld	W	D	L
1st place, gold medalist(s)	South Korea	4	3	1	0
2nd place, silver medalist(s)	Japan	4	2	0	2
3rd place, bronze medalist(s)	China	4	2	0	2
4	Kuwait	4	1	1	2
5	Saudi Arabia	4	1	0	3
