= Huang Hong =

Huang Hong may refer to:

- Huang Hong (handballer) (born 1980), Chinese team handball player
- Huang Hong (actor), Chinese skit and sitcom actor, director and writer

== See also ==
- Hung Huang, Chinese fashion figure
