= Kim Jae-hwan =

Kim Jae-hwan may refer to:

- Kim Jae-hwan (baseball) (born 1988), South Korean catcher and designated hitter
- Kim Jae-hwan (handballer) (born 1966), South Korean handball player
- Kim Jae-hoan (born 1988), South Korean footballer
- Kim Jae-hwan (badminton) (born 1996), South Korean badminton player
- Kim Jae-hwan (singer) (born 1996), South Korean singer
