= Handball at the Asian Games =

- Governing bodies: IHF (World) / AHF (Asia)
- Events: 2 (men: 1; women: 1)

Games
- 1951; 1954; 1958; 1962; 1966; 1970; 1974; 1978; 1982; 1986; 1990; 1994; 1998; 2002; 2006; 2010; 2014; 2018; 2022; 2026
- Medalists

Handball has been an Asian Games event since 1982 when the sport was first played in New Delhi, India. Women's handball was added later in 1990 in China.

== Summary ==
=== Men ===
#	Year	Host	Final			Third place match			Teams
#	Year	Host	Winner	Score	Runner-up	3rd place	Score	4th place	Teams
1	1982	(India); New Delhi	China	24–19	Japan	South Korea	32–22	Kuwait	8
2	1986	(South Korea); Seoul	South Korea	No playoffs	China	Japan	No playoffs	Kuwait	6
3	1990	(China); Beijing	South Korea	No playoffs	Japan	Saudi Arabia	No playoffs	China	6
4	1994	(Japan); Hiroshima	South Korea	No playoffs	Japan	China	No playoffs	Kuwait	5
5	1998	(Thailand); Bangkok	South Korea	29–18	Kuwait	Japan	28–23	Iran	8
6	2002	(South Korea); Busan	South Korea	22–21	Kuwait	Qatar	28–21	Japan	9
7	2006	(Qatar); Doha	Kuwait	27–24	Qatar	Iran	31–27	South Korea	15
8	2010	(China); Guangzhou	South Korea	32–28	Iran	Japan	27–20	Saudi Arabia	11
9	2014	(South Korea); Incheon	Qatar	24–21	South Korea	Bahrain	28–25	Iran	14
10	2018	(Indonesia); Jakarta–Palembang	Qatar	32–27 OT	Bahrain	South Korea	24–23	Japan	13
11	2022	(China); Hangzhou	Qatar	32–25	Bahrain	Kuwait	31–30	Japan	13
12	2026	(Japan); Aichi–Nagoya	Bahrain	33–32	Qatar	Japan	37–32	South Korea	9

=== Women ===
#	Year	Host	Final			Third place match			Teams
#	Year	Host	Winner	Score	Runner-up	3rd place	Score	4th place	Teams
1	1990	(China); Beijing	South Korea	No playoffs	China	Chinese Taipei	No playoffs	North Korea	6
2	1994	(Japan); Hiroshima	South Korea	No playoffs	Japan	China	No playoffs	Kazakhstan	4
3	1998	(Thailand); Bangkok	South Korea	No playoffs	North Korea	Japan	No playoffs	China	6
4	2002	(South Korea); Busan	South Korea	No playoffs	Kazakhstan	China	No playoffs	Japan	5
5	2006	(Qatar); Doha	South Korea	29–22	Kazakhstan	Japan	25–22	China	8
6	2010	(China); Guangzhou	China	31–22	Japan	South Korea	38–26	Kazakhstan	9
7	2014	(South Korea); Incheon	South Korea	29–19	Japan	Kazakhstan	27–26	China	9
8	2018	(Indonesia); Jakarta–Palembang	South Korea	29–23	China	Japan	43–14	Thailand	10
9	2022	(China); Hangzhou	Japan	29–19	South Korea	China	39–26	Kazakhstan	9
10	2026	(Japan); Aichi–Nagoya	South Korea	No playoffs	Japan	China	No playoffs	Kazakhstan	7

== Medal table ==
=== Total ===
Rank	Nation	Gold	Silver	Bronze	Total
1	South Korea (KOR)	14	2	3	19
2	Qatar (QAT)	3	2	1	6
3	China (CHN)	2	3	5	10
4	Japan (JPN)	1	7	7	15
5	Bahrain (BRN)	1	2	1	4
5	Kuwait (KUW)	1	2	1	4
7	Kazakhstan (KAZ)	0	2	1	3
8	Iran (IRI)	0	1	1	2
9	North Korea (PRK)	0	1	0	1
10	Chinese Taipei (TPE)	0	0	1	1
10	Saudi Arabia (KSA)	0	0	1	1
Totals (11 entries)		22	22	22	66

=== Men ===
Rank	Nation	Gold	Silver	Bronze	Total
1	South Korea	6	1	2	9
2	Qatar	3	2	1	6
3	Bahrain	1	2	1	4
3	Kuwait	1	2	1	4
5	China	1	1	1	3
6	Japan	0	3	4	7
7	Iran	0	1	1	2
8	Saudi Arabia	0	0	1	1
Totals (8 entries)		12	12	12	36

=== Women ===
Rank	Nation	Gold	Silver	Bronze	Total
1	South Korea	8	1	1	10
2	Japan	1	4	3	8
3	China	1	2	4	7
4	Kazakhstan	0	2	1	3
5	North Korea	0	1	0	1
6	Chinese Taipei	0	0	1	1
Totals (6 entries)		10	10	10	30

== Participating nations ==
=== Men ===
Team	(India) 1982	(South Korea) 1986	(China) 1990	(Japan) 1994	(Thailand) 1998	(South Korea) 2002	(Qatar) 2006	(China) 2010	(South Korea) 2014	(Indonesia) 2018	(China) 2022	(Japan) 2026	Years
Bahrain	7th					6th	7th	6th	3rd	2nd	2nd	1st	8
China	1st	2nd	4th	3rd	6th	7th	11th	7th	10th		5th	•	11
Chinese Taipei						5th			8th	9th			3
Hong Kong		6th					13th	10th	11th	8th	9th	•	7
India	8th						12th	9th	14th	10th			5
Indonesia										12th			1
Iran		5th			4th		3rd	2nd	4th	5th	7th	•	8
Iraq										7th			1
Japan	2nd	3rd	2nd	2nd	3rd	4th	6th	3rd	9th	4th	4th	3rd	12
Kazakhstan											7th	9th	2
Kuwait	4th	4th		4th	2nd	2nd	1st	8th	5th		3rd	•	10
Lebanon							9th						1
Macau							15th						1
Mongolia						9th		11th	12th		13th		4
North Korea			5th										1
Malaysia										13th			1
Oman									6th				1
Pakistan										11th			1
Qatar					7th	3rd	2nd	5th	1st	1st	1st	2nd	8
Saudi Arabia	5th		3rd	5th			8th	4th	7th	6th	9th		8
South Korea	3rd	1st	1st	1st	1st	1st	4th	1st	2nd	3rd	5th	4th	12
Syria							5th						1
Thailand					8th						9th		2
United Arab Emirates	6th		6th		5th	8th	10th		13th				6
Uzbekistan							14th				9th		2
Teams (25)	8	6	6	5	8	9	15	11	14	13	13	9	

=== Women ===
Team	(China) 1990	(Japan) 1994	(Thailand) 1998	(South Korea) 2002	(Qatar) 2006	(China) 2010	(South Korea) 2014	(Indonesia) 2018	(China) 2022	(Japan) 2026	Years
China	2nd	3rd	4th	3rd	4th	1st	4th	2nd	3rd	3rd	10
Chinese Taipei	3rd				5th	6th					3
Hong Kong	6th						6th	7th	7th	6th	5
India					8th	8th	8th	9th	5th		5
Indonesia								8th			1
Japan	5th	2nd	3rd	4th	3rd	2nd	2nd	3rd	1st	2nd	10
Kazakhstan		4th	5th	2nd	2nd	4th	3rd	6th	4th	4th	9
Malaysia								10th			1
Maldives							9th				1
Nepal									9th		1
North Korea	4th		2nd	5th		5th		5th			5
Qatar						9th					1
South Korea	1st	1st	1st	1st	1st	3rd	1st	1st	2nd	1st	10
Thailand			6th		7th	7th	7th	4th	7th		6
Uzbekistan					6th		5th		5th	5th	4
Vietnam										7th	1
Teams (16)	6	4	6	5	8	9	9	10	9	7	
