= Sayo Shiota =

Japanese handball player (born 1989)

Personal information
- Nationality: Japanese
- Born: 21 March 1989 (age 37) Kagawa, Japan
- Height: 1.72 m (5 ft 8 in)

Sport
- Sport: Handball
- Position: Left back
- Current club: Hokkoku Bank
National team
| Years | Team | Apps | (Gls) |
| – | Japan | 63 | (62) |
Medal record
Asian Games
| Silver medal – second place | 2010 Guangzhou | Team |
| Bronze medal – third place | 2018 Indonesia | Team |
Asian Championship
| Silver medal – second place | 2018 Japan |

Sayo Shiota (塩田 沙代, Shiota Sayo; born 21 March 1989) is a Japanese handball player for Hokkoku Bank and the Japanese national team.

She participated at the 2017 World Women's Handball Championship.
