= Salah Al-Marzouq =

Kuwaiti handball player

Personal information
- Nationality: Kuwait
- Born: 9 March 1970 (age 56)
- Height: 1.86 m (6 ft 1 in)
- Weight: 86 kg (190 lb)

Sport
- Sport: Handball
Medal record
Representing Kuwait
Men's handball
Asian Games
Silver medal – second place	2002 Busan

Salah Al-Marzouq (born 9 March 1970) is a Kuwaiti handball player. He competed in the 1996 Summer Olympics.

He also won a silver medal at the 2002 Asian Games.
