= Shi Wei (handballer) =

Chinese handball player (born 1970)

Personal information
- Nationality: Chinese
- Born: 3 February 1970 (age 56)

Sport
- Sport: Handball

Shi Wei (born 3 February 1970) is a Chinese handball player.

She competed in the women's tournament at the 1996 Summer Olympics. She also won three medals at the Asian Games : silver in 1990 in Beijing and bronze in 1994 in Hiroshima and in 2002 in Busan.
