= Khaldoun Al-Khashti =

Kuwaiti handball player

Personal information
- Nationality: Kuwait
- Born: 1 September 1970 (age 55)

Sport
- Sport: Handball
Medal record
Representing Kuwait
Men's handball
Asian Games
| Silver medal – second place | 1998 Bangkok |

Khaldoun Al-Khashti (born 1 September 1970) is a Kuwaiti handball player. He competed in the 1996 Summer Olympics.

He also won a silver medal at the 1998 Asian Games.
