= Yuki Maki =

Japanese footballer

Personal information
- Full name: Yuki Maki
- Date of birth: June 26, 1984 (age 42)
- Place of birth: Uki, Kumamoto, Japan
- Height: 1.82 m (5 ft 11 1/2 in)
- Position: Forward

Youth career
- 2003–2006: Komazawa University

Senior career*
Years	Team	Apps	(Gls)
2007–2012	Nagoya Grampus	58	(3)
2011	→Shonan Bellmare (loan)	12	(0)
Total		70	(3)
Medal record
Nagoya Grampus
Winner	J1 League	2010
Runner-up	Emperor's Cup	2009
- * Club domestic league appearances and goals

Yuki Maki (巻 佑樹, Maki Yūki; born June 26, 1984) is a Japanese former footballer. He played in the J1 League for Nagoya Grampus from 2008 to 2012, and he played in the J2 League for Shonan Bellmare in 2011.

He played as a forward and defender. He is also the brother of Japan national team player, Seiichiro Maki and Japan Handball League Omron's European handball Team's Karina Maki.

== Honours ==
- Japan University National Team (2005)
