= Qaied Al-Adwani =

Kuwaiti handball player

Personal information
- Nationality: Kuwait
- Born: 1 July 1971 (age 54)

Sport
- Sport: Handball
Medal record
Representing Kuwait
Men's handball
Asian Games
Silver medal – second place	1998 Bangkok

Qaied Al-Adwani (born 1 July 1971) is a Kuwaiti handball player. He competed in the 1996 Summer Olympics.

He also won a silver medal at the 1998 Asian Games.
