= Koh Suk-chang =

South Korean handball player (born 1963)

- Korean name
- Hangul: 고석창
- RR: Go Seokchang
- MR: Ko Sŏkch'ang

Olympic medal record

Men's handball

Representing South Korea
Silver medal – second place	1988 Seoul	Team

Asian Games
Gold medal – first place	1986 Seoul	Team

Koh Suk-Chang (Korean: 고석창; born June 14, 1963) is a male South Korean former handball player who competed in the 1984 Summer Olympics and in the 1988 Summer Olympics.

In 1984 he was a member of the South Korean team which finished eleventh in the Olympic tournament. He played all six matches and scored twelve goals.

Four years later he won the silver medal with the South Korean team in the 1988 Olympic tournament. He played all six matches again and scored eight goals.
