= Park Chan-young (handballer) =

South Korean handball player (born 1983)

- Hangul: 박찬영
- RR: Bak Chanyeong
- MR: Pak Ch'anyŏng

Park Chan-young (born 26 January 1983) is a South Korean handball player. At the 2012 Summer Olympics he competed with the South Korea men's national handball team in the men's tournament. His wife Lee Min-hee is also a handball player.
