= Kwag Hye-jeong =

South Korean handball player (born 1975)

- Hangul: 곽혜정
- RR: Gwak Hyejeong
- MR: Kwak Hyejŏng

Olympic medal record

Women's handball

Representing South Korea
Silver medal – second place	1996 Atlanta	Team

World Championship
Gold medal – first place	1995 Austria/Hungary	

Asian Games
Gold medal – first place	1998 Bangkok	

Kwag Hye-Jeong (born May 16, 1975) is a South Korean handball player who competed in the 1996 Summer Olympics. In 1996 she was part of the South Korean team which won the silver medal. She also participated in the winning South Korean team in the 1995 World Women's Handball Championship.

She also won a gold medal for South Korea at the 1998 Asian Games.
