= 1993 Asian Men's Handball Championship =

1993 Asian Championship
Tournament details
- Host country: Bahrain
- Venue(s): 1 (in 1 host city)
- Dates: 24 September – 5 October
- Teams: 12 (from 1 confederation)

Final positions
- Champions: South Korea (5th title)
- Runner-up: Kuwait
- Third place: Japan
- Fourth place: Saudi Arabia

The 1993 Asian Men's Handball Championship was the seventh Asian Championship, which took place from 24 September to 5 October 1993 in Manama, Bahrain.

== Preliminary round ==
=== Group A ===
Team	Pld	W	D	L	GF	GA	GD	Pts
China	2	1	1	0	63	47	+16	3
Saudi Arabia	2	0	2	0	39	39	0	2
Chinese Taipei	2	0	1	1	38	54	−16	1

China	39–23	Chinese Taipei	Manama

Saudi Arabia	24–24	China	Manama

Chinese Taipei	15–15	Saudi Arabia	Manama

=== Group B ===
Team	Pld	W	D	L	GF	GA	GD	Pts
Bahrain (H)	2	2	0	0	55	35	+20	4
Qatar	2	1	0	1	44	36	+8	2
India	2	0	0	2	32	60	−28	0

(H) Hosts

Bahrain	21–18	Qatar	Manama

Qatar	26–15	India	Manama

India	17–34	Bahrain	Manama

=== Group C ===
Team	Pld	W	D	L	GF	GA	GD	Pts
South Korea	2	2	0	0	62	35	+27	4
United Arab Emirates	2	1	0	1	56	61	−5	2
Kazakhstan	2	0	0	2	41	63	−22	0

South Korea	34–21	United Arab Emirates	Manama

United Arab Emirates	35–27	Kazakhstan	Manama

Kazakhstan	14–28	South Korea	Manama

=== Group D ===
Team	Pld	W	D	L	GF	GA	GD	Pts
Kuwait	2	2	0	0	56	48	+8	4
Japan	2	1	0	1	46	46	0	2
Iran	2	0	0	2	50	58	−8	0

Kuwait	23–21	Japan	Manama

Japan	25–23	Iran	Manama

Iran	27–33	Kuwait	Manama

== Main round ==
=== Group E ===
Team	Pld	W	D	L	GF	GA	GD	Pts
Kuwait	3	3	0	0	80	67	+13	6
Saudi Arabia	3	1	1	1	71	69	+2	3
Bahrain (H)	3	1	1	1	63	63	0	3
United Arab Emirates	3	0	0	3	51	66	−15	0

(H) Hosts

Kuwait	30–28	Saudi Arabia	Manama

Bahrain	19–17	United Arab Emirates	Manama

Kuwait	26–24	Bahrain	Manama

Saudi Arabia	23–19	United Arab Emirates	Manama

Saudi Arabia	20–20	Bahrain	Manama

United Arab Emirates	15–24	Kuwait	Manama

=== Group F ===
Team	Pld	W	D	L	GF	GA	GD	Pts
South Korea	3	3	0	0	79	69	+10	6
Japan	3	1	0	2	64	58	+6	2
China	3	1	0	2	67	71	−4	2
Qatar	3	1	0	2	53	65	−12	2

South Korea	22–19	Japan	Manama

Qatar	19–15	China	Manama

South Korea	33–30	China	Manama

Japan	26–14	Qatar	Manama

China	22–19	Japan	Manama

Qatar	20–24	South Korea	Manama

== Placement 5th–8th ==
=== 7th/8th ===
United Arab Emirates	23–26	Qatar	Manama

=== 5th/6th ===
Bahrain	25–26	China	Manama

== Final round ==
Semifinals
Kuwait	24
Japan	19
South Korea	32
Saudi Arabia	22

Gold medal match
Kuwait	22
South Korea	26
Bronze medal match
Japan
Saudi Arabia

=== Semifinals ===
Kuwait	24–19	Japan	Manama

South Korea	32–22	Saudi Arabia	Manama

=== Bronze medal match ===
5 October 1993	Japan	–	Saudi Arabia	Manama

=== Gold medal match ===
5 October 1993	Kuwait	22–26	South Korea	Manama

== Final standing ==
Rank	Team
1st place, gold medalist(s)	South Korea
2nd place, silver medalist(s)	Kuwait
3rd place, bronze medalist(s)	Japan
4	Saudi Arabia
5	China
6	Bahrain
7	Qatar
8	United Arab Emirates
9	Chinese Taipei
10	Iran
11	Kazakhstan
12	India
