= Bae Min-hee =

South Korean handball player (born 1988)

Personal information
- Born: 11 July 1988 (age 38) South Korea
- Height: 1.73 m (5 ft 8 in)

Sport
- Sport: Handball
- Position: Right wing
National team
- Years: Team
- –: South Korea
Medal record
Women's handball
Representing South Korea
Olympic Games
Bronze medal – third place	2008 Beijing	Team
Asian Games
Bronze medal – third place	2010 Guangzhou	Team
Asian Championships
Gold medal – first place	2008 Bangkok
Gold medal – first place	2012 Yogyakarta
Gold medal – first place	2015 Jakarta
Silver medal – second place	2010 Almaty

Korean name
- Hangul: 배민희
- RR: Bae Minhui
- MR: Pae Minhŭi

Bae Min-hee (Korean: 배민희; born 11 July 1988) is a South Korean handball player who competed at the 2008 Summer Olympics.

In 2008, she won a bronze medal with the South Korean team.
