= Lim Kyu-ha =

South Korean handball player (born 1957)

Personal information
- Nationality: South Korean
- Born: 28 September 1957 (age 68)

Sport
- Sport: Handball
Medal record
Asian Games
Gold medal – first place	1986 Seoul	Team
Bronze medal – third place	1982 Delhi	Team

Lim Kyu-ha (born 28 September 1957) is a South Korean handball player. He competed in the men's tournament at the 1984 Summer Olympics.
