= China men's national handball team =

China

Information
- Association: Chinese Handball Association
- Coach: Dragan Đukić
- Assistant coach: Wang Quan; Wang Wei

Colours
1st	2nd

Results

Summer Olympics
- Appearances: 1 (First in 2008)
- Best result: 12th (2008)

World Championship
- Appearances: 2 (First in 1997)
- Best result: 20th (1997, 1999)

Asian Championship
- Appearances: 17 (First in 1977)
- Best result: (silver) 2nd (1979, 2000)
- Last updated on Unknown.

China men's national handball team
Medal record

Asian Games
Gold medal – first place	1982 New Delhi	Team
Silver medal – second place	1986 Seoul	Team
Bronze medal – third place	1994 Hiroshima	Team

Asian Championship
Silver medal – second place	1979 Nanjing	
Silver medal – second place	2000 Kumamoto	
Bronze medal – third place	1977 Kuwait City	
Bronze medal – third place	1991 Hiroshima	

The China men's national handball team is the national team of China. It is governed by the Chinese Handball Association and takes part in international team handball competitions.

== Results ==
=== Summer Olympics ===
- 2008 – 12th place

=== World Championship ===
- 1997 – 20th place
- 1999 – 20th place

=== Asian Games ===
- 1982 – (gold) Gold Medal
- 1986 – (silver) Silver Medal
- 1990 – 4th place
- 1994 – (bronze) Bronze Medal
- 1998 – 6th place
- 2002 – 7th place
- 2006 – 11th place
- 2010 – 7th place
- 2014 – 10th place
- 2022 – 5th place

=== Asian Championship ===
- 1977 – (bronze) Bronze Medal
- 1979 – (silver) Silver Medal
- 1987 – 4th place
- 1989 – 4th place
- 1991 – (bronze) Bronze Medal
- 1993 – 5th place
- 1995 – 5th place
- 2000 – (silver) Silver Medal
- 2006 – 8th place
- 2008 – 7th place
- 2010 – 9th place
- 2014 – 11th place
- 2016 – 9th place
- 2018 – 9th place
- 2020 – 11th place
- 2024 – 10th place
- 2026 – 9th place

=== IHF Emerging Nations Championship ===
- 2015 – 10th place
- 2017 – 6th place
- 2019 – 6th place
