= Park Young-dae =

South Korean handball player (born 1964)

- Korean name
- Hangul: 박영대
- RR: Bak Yeongdae
- MR: Pak Yŏngdae

Olympic medal record

Men's Handball
Silver medal – second place	1988 Seoul	Team

Asian Games
Gold medal – first place	1986 Seoul	Team

Park Young-Dae (born June 9, 1964) is a male South Korean former handball player who competed in the 1984 Summer Olympics and in the 1988 Summer Olympics.

In 1984 he was a member of the South Korean team which finished eleventh in the Olympic tournament. He played all six matches and scored one goal.

Four years later he won the silver medal with the South Korean team in the 1988 Olympic tournament. He played all six matches and scored one goal again.
