= Jung Ji-hae =

South Korean handball player (born 1985)

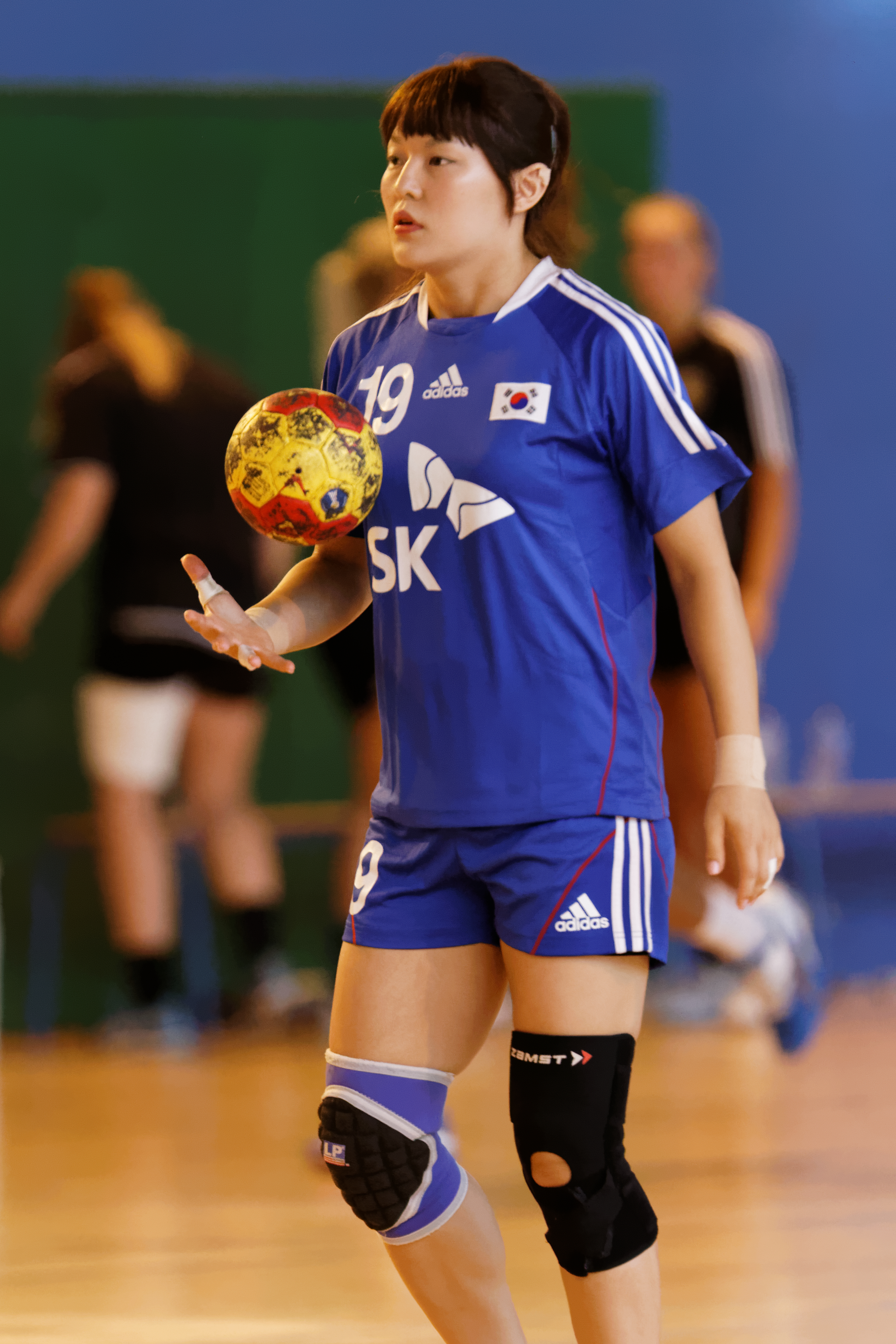

Personal information
- Nationality: South Korean
- Born: 6 March 1985 (age 41) Seoul, South Korea
- Height: 1.68 m (5 ft 6 in)

Sport
- Sport: Handball
- Position: Centre back
- Current club: Wonderful Samcheok
National team
- Years: Team
- –: South Korea
Medal record
Asian Games
| Gold medal – first place | 2014 Incheon | Team |
| Gold medal – first place | 2018 Jakarta | Team |
| Bronze medal – third place | 2010 Guangzhou | Team |

- Jung Ji-hae
- Hangul: 정지해
- Hanja: 鄭地海
- RR: Jeong Jihae
- MR: Chŏng Chihae

Jung Ji-hae (born 6 March 1985) is a South Korean handball player. She plays for the South Korean national team and participated at the 2011 World Women's Handball Championship in Brazil and the 2012 Summer Olympics.
