= Lee Sang-hyo =

South Korean handball player (born 1961)

- Hangul: 이상효
- RR: I Sanghyo
- MR: I Sanghyo

Olympic medal record

Men's handball

Representing South Korea
Silver medal – second place	1988 Seoul	Team

Asian Games
Gold medal – first place	1986 Seoul	Team
Bronze medal – third place	1982 Delhi	Team

Lee Sang-Hyo (born September 10, 1961) is a male South Korean former handball player who competed in the 1984 Summer Olympics and in the 1988 Summer Olympics.

In 1984 he was a member of the South Korean team which finished eleventh in the Olympic tournament. He played all six matches and scored 22 goals.

Four years later he won the silver medal with the South Korean team in the 1988 Olympic tournament. He played all six matches again and scored 31 goals.
