= Choi Tae-sup =

South Korean handball player (born 1962)

Personal information
- Nationality: South Korean
- Born: 29 December 1962 (age 63)

Sport
- Sport: Handball
National team
- Years: Team
- –: South Korea

Teams managed
- –: South Korea

Choi Tae-sup (born 29 December 1962) is a South Korean handball player and coach. He competed in the men's tournament at the 1984 Summer Olympics.

Later he was the head coach of the Korean national team, where he guided them at the 2009 World Men's Handball Championship.
