= Kim On-a =

South Korean handball player (born 1988)

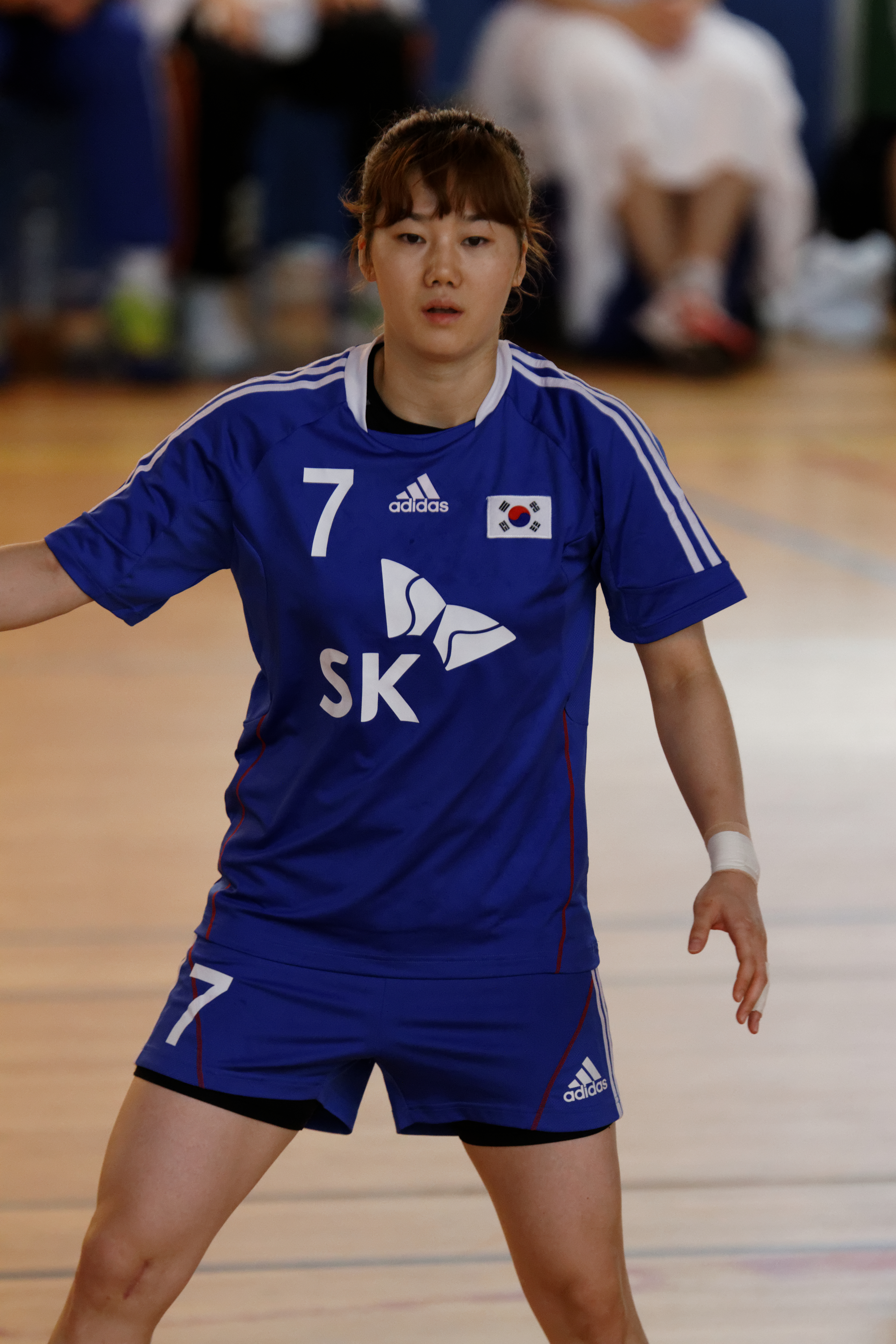

Personal information
- Nationality: South Korean
- Born: 6 September 1988 (age 38)
- Height: 1.69 m (5 ft 7 in)

Sport
- Sport: Handball
- Position: Centre back
- Current club: SK Sugar Gliders
National team
Years	Team	Apps	(Gls)
–	South Korea	96	(332)
Medal record
Olympic Games
Bronze medal – third place	2008 Beijing	Team
Asian Games
Gold medal – first place	2014 Incheon	Team
Gold medal – first place	2018 Jakarta	Team
Bronze medal – third place	2010 Guangzhou	Team

- Kim On-a
- Hangul: 김온아
- RR: Gim Ona
- MR: Kim Ona

Kim On-A (born 6 September 1988) is a South Korean handball player who competed at the 2008 Summer Olympics, winning a bronze medal. She also competed at the 2012 and 2016 Olympics.
