= 1995 Asian Men's Handball Championship =

1995 Asian Championship
Tournament details
- Host country: Kuwait
- Venue(s): 1 (in 1 host city)
- Dates: 25 September – 6 October
- Teams: 9 (from 1 confederation)

Final positions
- Champions: Kuwait (1st title)
- Runner-up: South Korea
- Third place: Bahrain
- Fourth place: Japan

The 1995 Asian Men's Handball Championship was the eighth Asian Championship, which was taking place from 25 September to 6 October 1995 in Kuwait City, Kuwait. It acted as the Asian qualifying tournament for the 1996 Olympic Games.

== Preliminary round ==
=== Group B ===
Team	Pld	W	D	L	GF	GA	GD	Pts
South Korea	2	2	0	0	65	45	+20	4
United Arab Emirates	2	1	0	1	-	-	—	2
Kazakhstan	2	0	0	2	-	-	—	0

South Korea	29–27	United Arab Emirates	Kuwait City

United Arab Emirates	–	Kazakhstan	Kuwait City

Kazakhstan	18–36	South Korea	Kuwait City

== Elimination round ==
South Korea	24–23	China	Kuwait City

Kuwait	–	United Arab Emirates	Kuwait City

Bahrain	–	Japan	Kuwait City

== Final round ==
=== Placement 7th–9th ===
Team	Pld	W	D	L	GF	GA	GD	Pts
Chinese Taipei	2	1	1	0	-	-	—	3
Kazakhstan	2	1	1	0	-	-	—	3
India	2	0	0	2	-	-	—	0

Chinese Taipei	–	India	Kuwait City

India	–	Kazakhstan	Kuwait City

4 October 1995	Kazakhstan	22–22	Chinese Taipei	Kuwait City

=== Placement 4th–6th ===
Team	Pld	W	D	L	GF	GA	GD	Pts
Japan	2	2	0	0	-	-	—	4
China	2	1	0	1	-	-	—	2
United Arab Emirates	2	0	0	2	-	-	—	0

United Arab Emirates	–	Japan	Kuwait City

Japan	–	China	Kuwait City

5 October 1995	China	25–18	United Arab Emirates	Kuwait City

=== Championship ===
Team	Pld	W	D	L	GF	GA	GD	Pts
Kuwait	2	2	0	0	45	42	+3	4
South Korea	2	1	0	1	52	49	+3	2
Bahrain	2	0	0	2	46	52	−6	0

4 October 1995	South Korea	30–26	Bahrain	Kuwait City
4 October 1995		(13–9)		Kuwait City

5 October 1995	Kuwait	23–22	South Korea	Kuwait City
5 October 1995		(12–11)		Kuwait City

6 October 1995	Bahrain	20–22	Kuwait	Kuwait City
6 October 1995		(12–13)		Kuwait City

== Final standing ==
Rank	Team
1st place, gold medalist(s)	Kuwait
2nd place, silver medalist(s)	South Korea
3rd place, bronze medalist(s)	Bahrain
4	Japan
5	China
6	United Arab Emirates
7	Chinese Taipei
8	Kazakhstan
9	India

Team qualified for the 1996 Summer Olympics
