= Park Kyung-suk (handballer) =

South Korean handball player (born 1981)

Personal information
- Nationality: South Korean
- Born: 24 April 1981 (age 44)

Korean name
- Hangul: 박경석
- RR: Bak Gyeongseok
- MR: Pak Kyŏngsŏk

Park Kyung-suk (born 25 April 1981) is a South Korean handball player. At the 2012 Summer Olympics he competed with the South Korean national handball team in the men's tournament.
