= Kazakhstan men's national handball team =

Kazakhstan

Information
- Association: Kazakhstan Handball Federation

Colours
| 1st | 2nd |

Results

Asian Championship
- Appearances: 3 (First in 1993)
- Best result: 8th (1995)
- Last updated on Unknown.

The Kazakhstan national handball team is the national handball team of Kazakhstan.

== Tournament history ==
=== Asian Championship ===
- 1993 – 11th place
- 1995 – 8th place
- 2024 – 14th place

=== Asian Games ===
- Handball at the 2022 Asian Games – Men's tournament
- Handball at the 2026 Asian Games – Men's tournament

=== Olympic Games ===
- Handball at the 2012 Summer Olympics – Asian men's qualification tournament
- Handball at the 2020 Summer Olympics – Asian men's qualification tournament
- Handball at the 2024 Summer Olympics – Asian men's qualification tournament
