= Mohamed Abdulredha =

Bahraini handball player

Personal information
- Full name: Mohamed Abdul Redha
- Nationality: Bahraini
- Born: 27 September 1989 (age 37)
- Height: 1.83 m (6 ft 0 in)

Sport
- Sport: Handball
- Position: Right back
- Current club: Al-Najma
- Number: 9
National team
Years	Team	Apps	(Gls)
–	Bahrain	42	(72)
Medal record
Asian Championship
Silver medal – second place	2018 South Korea	Team
Silver medal – second place	2022 Saudi Arabia	Team
Bronze medal – third place	2024 Bahrain	Team
Asian Games
Silver medal – second place	2018 Indonesia	Team

Mohamed Abdulredha (Arabic: محمد عبد الرضا, romanized: Mohamed Abdul Redha, born 27 September 1989) is a Bahraini handball player for Al-Najma and the Bahraini national team.

He represented Bahrain at the 2019 World Men's Handball Championship and at the delayed 2020 Summer Olympics.
