= Lim Jin-suk =

South Korean handball player (born 1968)

- Korean name
- Hangul: 임진석
- RR: Im Jinseok
- MR: Im Chinsŏk

Olympic medal record

Men's handball

Representing South Korea
Silver medal – second place	1988 Seoul	Team

Asian Games
Gold medal – first place	1986 Seoul	Team

Lim Jin-suk (born May 16, 1968) is a male South Korean former handball player who competed in the 1988 Summer Olympics and in the 1992 Summer Olympics.

In 1988 he was a member of the South Korean team which won the silver medal in the Olympic tournament. He played all six matches.

Four years later he finished sixth with the South Korean team in the 1992 Olympic tournament. He played all six matches again and scored 13 goals.
