= Zhang Hong (handballer) =

Chinese handball player (born 1966)

Zhang Hong (Chinese: 张弘, born 19 January 1966) is a former Chinese handball player who participated at the 1988 Summer Olympics, where China finished 6th. Zhang also won a silver medal at the 1990 Asian Games.
