= Kim Cheong-sim =

South Korean handball player (born 1976)

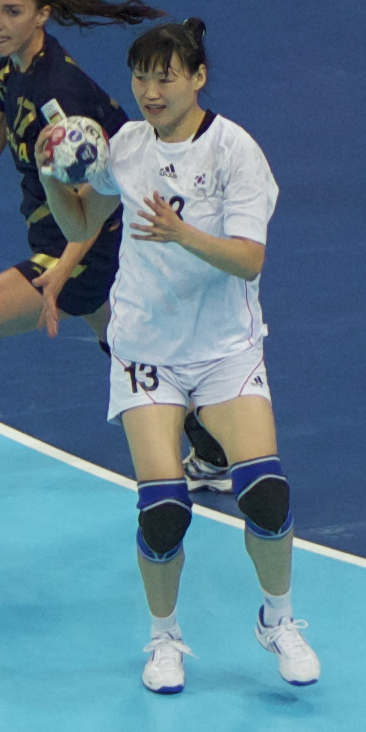

Korean name
- Hangul: 김정심
- RR: Gim Jeongsim
- MR: Kim Chŏngsim

Olympic medal record

Women's Handball
Silver medal – second place	1996 Atlanta	Team

Kim Cheong-Sim (born February 8, 1976) is a South Korean handball player who competed in the 1996 Summer Olympics and the 2012 Summer Olympics.

In 1996 she was part of the South Korean team which who the silver medal. She played one match.
