= Hwang Yo-na =

South Korean handball player (born 1965)

Personal information
- Nationality: South Korean
- Born: 5 June 1965 (age 60)

Sport
- Sport: Handball

Hwang Yo-na (born 5 June 1965) is a South Korean handball player. He competed in the men's tournament at the 1984 Summer Olympics.
