= Xue Jinhua =

Chinese handball player (born 1965)

Personal information
- Nationality: Chinese
- Born: 13 May 1965 (age 61)

Sport
- Sport: Handball

Xue Jinhua (born 13 May 1965) is a Chinese handball player. She competed in the women's tournament at the 1988 Summer Olympics.
