= Lu Guanghong =

Chinese handball player (born 1967)

Personal information
- Nationality: Chinese
- Born: 1 August 1967 (age 58)

Sport
- Sport: Handball

Lu Guanghong (born 1 August 1967) is a Chinese handball player. She competed in the women's tournament at the 1988 Summer Olympics.
