= Kiyoshi Nishiyama (handballer) =

Japanese handball player (born 1959)

Kiyoshi Nishiyama (西山 清, Nishiyama Kiyoshi; born 8 April 1959) is a Japanese former handball player who competed in the 1984 Summer Olympics and in the 1988 Summer Olympics.
