= Xu Mo =

Chinese handball player (born 1990)

Personal information
- Nationality: Chinese
- Born: 2 March 1990 (age 36)
- Height: 1.85 m (6 ft 1 in)

Sport
- Sport: Handball
- Position: Goalkeeper
- Current club: Shanghai Handball
National team
Years	Team	Apps	(Gls)
–	China	190	(0)

Xu Mo (born 2 March 1990) is a Chinese handball player. She played on the Chinese national team and participated at the 2009 World Women's Handball Championship at home, as well as the 2011 World Women's Handball Championship in Brazil.
