= Kim Eun-mi (handballer) =

South Korean handball player (born 1975)

Personal information
- Nationality: South Korean
- Born: 17 December 1975 (age 50)
- Height: 171 cm (67 in)

Sport
- Sport: Handball
- Position: Right wing
- Current club: Retired

Senior clubs
- Years: Team
- –: Korea National Sport University
- 1999–2002: Borussia Dortmund
National team
- Years: Team
- –: South Korea
Medal record
Women's Handball
Silver medal – second place	1996 Atlanta	Team
World Championship
Gold medal – first place	1995 Austria/Hungary
Asian Games
Gold medal – first place	1994 Hiroshima
Gold medal – first place	1998 Bangkok
Asian Championship
Gold medal – first place	1995 South Korea
- Korean name
- Hangul: 김은미
- RR: Gim Eunmi
- MR: Kim Ŭnmi

Kim Eun-mi (born December 17, 1975) is a South Korean handball player, won the World Championship in 1995, and a silver medal at the 1996 Summer Olympics.

== National team ==
She was part of the South Korean team that won gold medals at the 1994 Asian Games.

In 1996 she was part of the South Korean team which who the silver medal. She played all five matches and scored 16 goals, and was selected for the all-star team.

In 1995 she was part of the South Korea team that won the 1995 World Championship. The same year she won a gold medal at the 1995 Asian Women's Handball Championship, where they beat China in the final 34-24, and Kim scored 3 goals in the final.

Three years later she won gold medals at the 1998 Asian Games.

== Club career ==
Kim Eun-mi played in South Korea for the Korea National Sport University. In 1999 she joined the German team, where she played until 2002.
