= Jung Su-young =

South Korean handball player (born 1985)

Personal information
- Nationality: Korean
- Born: 17 October 1985 (age 41)
- Height: 1.85 m (6 ft 1 in)

Sport
- Sport: Handball
- Position: Right back
- Current club: Hanam Handball Club
National team
| Years | Team | Apps |
| – | Korea | 32 |

- Jung Su-young
- Hangul: 정수영
- RR: Jeong Suyeong
- MR: Chŏng Suyŏng

Jung Su-young (born 17 October 1985) is a Korean handball player for Hanam Handball Club and the Korean national team.

He competed in the 2008 Summer Olympics and 2012 Summer Olympics.
