= Oh Yun-suk =

South Korean handball player (born 1984)

- Hangul: 오윤석
- RR: O Yunseok
- MR: O Yunsŏk

Oh Yun-suk (born 1 March 1984) is a South Korean male handball player who competed in the 2004 Summer Olympics.
