= Mohammad Reza Rajabi =

Iranian handball player (born 1986)

Personal information
- Nationality: Iranian
- Born: 10 January 1986 (age 40)
- Height: 1.90 m (6 ft 3 in)

Sport
- Sport: Handball
- Position: Left back
- Current club: Naft Al-Janoob
National team
Years	Team	Apps	(Gls)
–	Iran	145	(662)

Mohammad Reza Rajabi (Persian: محمدرضا رجبی, born 10 January 1986) is an Iranian handball player for Naft Al-Janoob and the Iranian national team.
