= Hiromi Tashiro =

Japanese handball player (born 1982)

Hiromi Tashiro (born 1982) is a Japanese team handball goalkeeper. She plays on the Japanese national team, and participated at the 2011 World Women's Handball Championship in Brazil.
