= Koji Tachiki =

Japanese handball player (born 1960)

Koji Tachiki (立木浩二, Tachiki Kōji; born 28 April 1960) is a Japanese former handball player who competed in the 1988 Summer Olympics.
