= Yu Geli =

Chinese handball player (born 1976)

Yu Geli (simplified Chinese: 于格丽; traditional Chinese: 於格麗; pinyin: Yú Gélì; born March 29, 1976, in Laiyang, Yantai, Shandong) is a female Chinese handball player who competed in the 1996 Summer Olympics and in the 2004 Summer Olympics.

In 1996 she finished fifth with the Chinese team in the women's competition. She played all four matches as goalkeeper.

Eight years later she was a member of the Chinese team which finished eighth in the women's competition. She played all seven matches as goalkeeper.
