= Cho Eun-hee (athlete) =

South Korean handball player (born 1972)

- Korean name
- Hangul: 조은희
- RR: Jo Eunhui
- MR: Cho Ŭnhŭi

Olympic medal record

Representing South Korea

Women's Handball
Silver medal – second place	1996 Atlanta	Team

World Championship
Gold medal – first place	1995 Austria/Hungary	

Asian Games
Gold medal – first place	1990 Beyjing	

Cho Eun-hee (born May 20, 1972) is a South Korean handball player who competed in the 1996 Summer Olympics.

In 1996 she was part of the South Korean team which who the silver medal. She played one match as goalkeeper.

In 1995 she was part of the South Korea team that won the 1995 World Championship.
