= Yoshihiro Shiga =

Japanese handball player (born 1956)

Yoshihiro Shiga (志賀 良弘, Shiga Yoshihiro; born 4 April 1956) is a Japanese former handball player who competed in the 1984 Summer Olympics.
