= Kim Sung-heon =

South Korean handball player (born 1974)

- Hangul: 김성헌
- RR: Gim Seongheon
- MR: Kim Sŏnghŏn

Kim Sung-heon (born 2 September 1974) is a South Korean handball player who competed in the 2004 Summer Olympics.
