= Izumi Fujii =

Japanese handball player (born 1959)

Izumi Fujii (藤井泉, Fujii Izumi, born 26 June 1959) is a Japanese former handball player who competed in the 1988 Summer Olympics.
