= Karina Maki =

Japanese handball player (born 1982)

Karina Maki (巻 加理奈, Maki Karina; born July 13, 1982) is a Team handball player from Uki in Kumamoto Prefecture, Japan. She plays for Japan Handball League side Omron. She is a sister of Japan National Team International and JEF United Ichihara Chiba star, Seiichiro Maki and Nagoya Grampus forward/defender Yuki Maki. She is 169 cm tall and weighs 69 kg. Karina Maki's position is utility (often play as offensive defender). During her childhood school days she used to play Ice Hockey (with her brother Seiichiro Maki) and Basketball. Her nickname is "Hiro" by her teammates and OMRON fans.

== Playing style ==
Karina Maki is well known for her all round skills especially her offensive plays and skills
