= Sun Mengying =

Chinese handball player (born 1990)

Personal information
- Nationality: Chinese
- Born: 11 April 1990 (age 36)
- Height: 1.77 m (5 ft 10 in)

Sport
- Sport: Handball
- Position: Right back
- Current club: Shanghai
National team
Years	Team	Apps	(Gls)
–	China	96	(141)

Sun Mengying (born 11 April 1990) is a Chinese handball player for Shanghai and the Chinese national team.

She competed at the 2009 World Women's Handball Championship at home, as well as the 2015 World Women's Handball Championship in Denmark.
