= Kaori Fujima =

Japanese handball player (born 1982)

Personal information
- Nationality: Japanese
- Born: 6 July 1982 (age 44)
- Height: 1.73 m (5 ft 8 in)

Sport
- Sport: Handball
- Position: Goalkeeper
- Current club: Omron
National team
Years	Team	Apps	(Gls)
–	Japan	79	(0)

Kaori Fujima (藤間 香織, Fujima Kaori; born 6 July 1982) is a Japanese handball goalkeeper. She plays on the Japanese national team and participated at the 2011 World Women's Handball Championship in Brazil.
