= Wang Xindong =

Chinese handball player

Wang Xindong (born 18 February 1967) is a former Chinese team handball player and current coach. He served as head coach for the China women's national handball team, and led the team at the 2011 World Women's Handball Championship in Brazil and at the 2013 World Women's Handball Championship in Serbia. Before that he was the assistant coach on the Chinese national team for the 2008 Olympics.
