= Jalal Kiani =

Iranian handball player (born 1989)

Personal information
- Nationality: Iranian
- Born: 28 September 1989 (age 37)
- Height: 1.83 m (6 ft 0 in)

Sport
- Sport: Handball
- Position: Right back
- Current club: Magnesium Ferdows
National team
Years	Team	Apps	(Gls)
–	Iran	42	(122)

Jalal Kiani (Persian: جلال کیانی, born 28 September 1989) is an Iranian handball player for Magnesium Ferdows and the Iranian national team.
