= Aimi Ito =

Japanese handball player (born 1983)

Aimi Ito (伊藤 亜衣美, Itō Aimi; born 1983) is a Japanese team handball player. She plays on the Japanese national team, and participated at the 2011 World Women's Handball Championship in Brazil.
