= Wang Tao (handballer) =

Chinese handball player (born 1957)

Personal information
- Nationality: Chinese
- Born: 14 June 1957 (age 68)

Sport
- Sport: Handball

Wang Tao (born 14 June 1957) is a Chinese handball player. She competed at the 1988 Summer Olympics and the 1996 Summer Olympics. She later became the president of the Chinese Handball Association.
