= Cong Yanxia =

Chinese handball player (born 1976)

Personal information
- Nationality: Chinese
- Born: 20 February 1976 (age 49)

Sport
- Sport: Handball

Cong Yanxia (Chinese: 丛艳霞; pinyin: Cóng Yànxiá; born 20 February 1976) is a Chinese handball player. She competed in the women's tournament at the 1996 Summer Olympics.
