= Lee Sun-soon =

South Korean handball player (born 1969)

Personal information
- Nationality: South Korean
- Born: 26 March 1969 (age 56)

Sport
- Sport: Handball

Lee Sun-soon (born 26 March 1969) is a South Korean handball player. He competed in the men's tournament at the 1992 Summer Olympics.
