= Seiichi Takamura =

Japanese handball player (born 1960)

Seiichi Takamura (高村 誠一, Takamura Seiichi; born 11 December 1960) is a Japanese former handball player who competed in the 1984 Summer Olympics and in the 1988 Summer Olympics.
