= Mehdi Bijari =

Iranian handball player (born 1983)

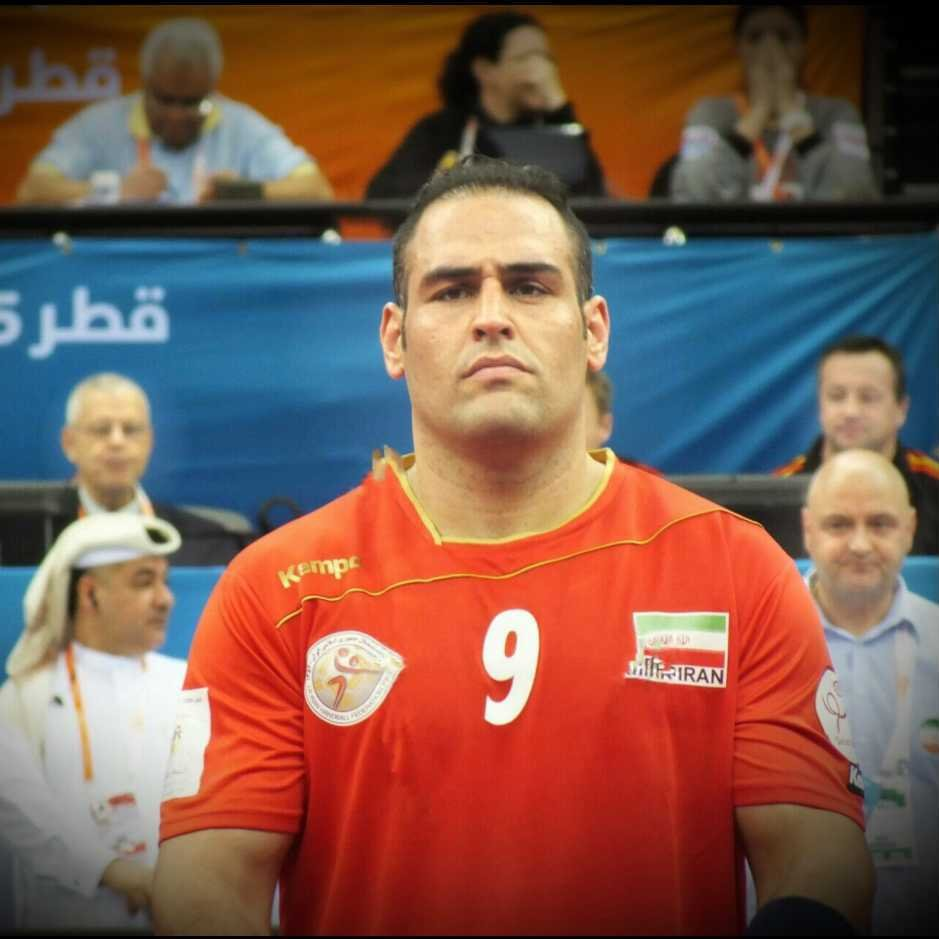

Personal information
- Nationality: Iranian
- Born: 5 December 1983 (age 42)
- Height: 1.91 m (6 ft 3 in)

Sport
- Sport: Handball
- Position: Pivot
- Current club: Samen Sabzevar
National team
Years	Team	Apps	(Gls)
–	Iran	47	(95)

Mehdi Bijari (Persian: مهدی بیجاری; born 5 December 1983) is an Iranian handball player for Samen Sabzevar and the Iranian national team.
