= Kim Hyang-ki =

South Korean handball player (born 1980)

Personal information
- Nationality: South Korean
- Born: 31 January 1980 (age 46)

Sport
- Sport: Handball
Medal record
Asian Games
Gold medal – first place	1998 Bangkok

Kim Hyang-ki (born 31 January 1980) is a South Korean handball player. She competed in the women's tournament at the 2000 Summer Olympics.

At the 1998 Asian Games she won a gold medal for South Korea.
