= Lee Nam-soo =

South Korean handball player (born 1976)

Personal information
- Nationality: South Korean
- Born: 21 May 1976 (age 50)

Sport
- Sport: Handball
Medal record
Asian Games
Gold medal – first place	1998 Bangkok
Gold medal – first place	2002 Busan

Lee Nam-soo (Korean: 이남수; born 21 May 1976), is a South Korean handball player. She competed in the women's tournament at the 2000 Summer Olympics with the South Korean team.

At the 1998 Asian Games she won a gold medal for South Korea. Four years later she won a gold medal again at the 2002 Asian Games.
