= Lee Chang-woo =

South Korean handball player (born 1983)

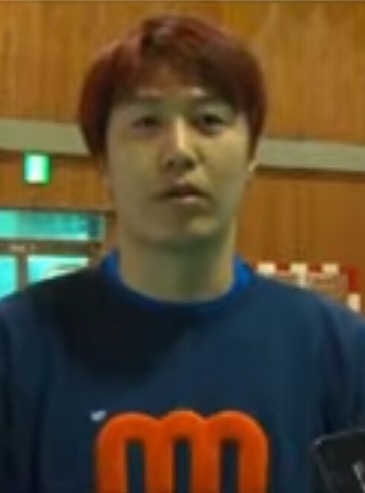

Personal information
- Full name: Lee Chang-Wu
- Nationality: South Korean
- Born: 12 May 1983 (age 43) Changwon, South Korea
- Height: 187 cm (74 in)

Sport
- Sport: Handball
National team
- Years: Team
- –: South Korea
Medal record
Asian Championship
Bronze medal – third place	2018 South Korea

- Korean name
- Hangul: 이창우
- RR: I Changu
- MR: I Ch'angu

Lee Chang-Woo (born 12 May 1983), also known as Lee Chang-Wu, is a South Korean handball player who competed in the 2004 and 2012 Summer Olympics.
