= Park Min-chul =

South Korean handball player (born 1974)

Park Min-Chul (born 23 December 1974) is a Korean handball player who competed in the 2000 Summer Olympics and in the 2004 Summer Olympics.
