= Jang So-hee =

South Korean handball player (born 1978)

Jang So-Hee
Personal information
- Nationality: South Korean
- Born: 15 March 1987 (age 39)
- Height: 162 cm (64 in)

Sport
- Sport: Handball
- Position: Left wing
- Current club: Retired

Senior clubs
- Years: Team
- 1996–1997: Dongseong Pharmaceutical
- 1997–2006: Daegu Metropolitan City Hall
- 2006–2009: Japan Women's College of Physical Education
- 2009–2012: Sony Semiconductor Kyushu
- 2012–2014: SK Sugar Gliders
National team
- Years: Team
- –: South Korea

Teams managed
- –: Japan junior
Medal record
Women's handball
Representing South Korea
Silver medal – second place	2004 Athens	Team
Asian Games
Gold medal – first place	2002 Changwon
- Korean name
- Hangul: 장소희
- Hanja: 張素姬
- RR: Jang Sohui
- MR: Chang Sohŭi

Jang So-Hee (born March 15, 1978) is a South Korean handball player who competed in the 2004 Summer Olympics.

In 2004, she won the silver medal with the South Korean team. She played all seven matches and scored 21 goals. South Korea lost to Denmark in the final on a penalty shoot out.

After her playing days, she has become a handball coach.
