= Luan Zheng =

Chinese handball player (born 1984)

Personal information
- Nationality: Chinese
- Born: May 2, 1984 (age 42)
- Height: 175 cm (69 in)

Sport
- Sport: Handball
- Position: Right back
National team
- Years: Team
- –: China

Luan Zheng (Chinese: 栾征; born 2 May 1984) is a Chinese team handball player. She plays on the Chinese national team, and participated at the 2011 World Women's Handball Championship in Brazil.
