= Yan Meizhu =

Chinese handball player (born 1989)

Personal information
- Nationality: Chinese
- Born: 28 January 1989 (age 37) Shanxi, China
- Height: 1.88 m (6 ft 2 in)

Sport
- Sport: Handball
- Position: Right back
- Current club: Beijing Handball
National team
Years	Team	Apps	(Gls)
–	China	140	(270)

Yan Meizhu (Chinese: 闫美珠; born 28 January 1989) is a Chinese handball player. Playing on the Chinese national team, she competed at the 2008 Summer Olympics in Beijing, where China placed sixth.
