= Takahiro Ohata =

Japanese handball player (born 1957)

Takahiro Ohata (大畑 孝広, Ōhata Takahiro; born 9 January 1957) is a Japanese former handball player who competed in the 1984 Summer Olympics.
