= Chung Eun-hee =

South Korean handball player (born 1977)

Personal information
- Nationality: South Korean
- Born: 1 May 1977 (age 48)

Sport
- Sport: Handball

Chung Eun-hee (born 1 May 1977) is a South Korean handball player. She competed in the women's tournament at the 2000 Summer Olympics.
