= Kumi Mori =

Japanese handball player (born 1985)

Kumi Mori (born 1985) is a Japanese team handball goalkeeper. She plays on the Japanese national team, and participated at the 2011 World Women's Handball Championship in Brazil.
