= Megumi Honda =

Japanese handball player (born 1986)

Personal information
- Nationality: Japanese
- Born: 14 July 1986 (age 40)
- Height: 1.59 m (5 ft 3 in)

Sport
- Sport: Handball
- Position: Right wing
- Current club: Sony Semiconductor
National team
Years	Team	Apps	(Gls)
–	Japan	74	(169)

Megumi Honda (本田 恵, Honda Megumi; born 14 July 1986) (née Takahashi 高橋) is a Japanese handball player. She plays for the Sony Semiconductor, and on the Japanese national team. She represented Japan at the 2013 World Women's Handball Championship in Serbia, where the Japanese team placed 14th.
