= Choi Hyun-ho =

South Korean handball player (born 1976)

Personal information
- Nationality: South Korean
- Born: 16 April 1976 (age 49)

Sport
- Sport: Handball

Choi Hyun-ho (born 16 April 1976) is a South Korean handball player. He competed in the men's tournament at the 2000 Summer Olympics.

== Filmography ==
=== Television show ===
Year	Title	Role	Notes	Ref.
2022	Steel Ball	Host	Steel Troops spin-off	
