= Park Do-hun =

South Korean handball player (born 1964)

- Korean name
- Hangul: 박도헌
- RR: Bak Doheon
- MR: Pak Tohŏn

Olympic medal record

Men's Handball
| Silver medal – second place | 1988 Seoul | Team |

Asian Games
| Gold medal – first place | 1986 Seoul | Team |

Park Do-Hun (born March 20, 1964) is a male South Korean former handball player who competed in the 1988 Summer Olympics and in the 1992 Summer Olympics.

In 1988 he won the silver medal with the South Korean team. He played all six matches and scored 21 goals.

Four years later he finished sixth with the South Korean team in the 1992 Olympic tournament. He played all six matches again and scored eleven goals.
