= Shinji Okuda =

Japanese handball player (born 1959)

Shinji Okuda (奥田新治, Okuda Shinji, born 11 June 1959) is a Japanese former handball player who competed in the 1988 Summer Olympics.
