= Zhao Ying (handballer) =

Chinese handball player (born 1978)

Personal information
- Nationality: Chinese
- Born: 16 March 1978 (age 47)

Sport
- Sport: Handball

Zhao Ying (born 16 March 1978) is a Chinese handball player. She competed in the women's tournament at the 1996 Summer Olympics.
