= Han Kyung-tai =

South Korean handball player (born 1975)

Personal information
- Nationality: South Korean
- Born: 11 April 1975 (age 50)

Korean name
- Hangul: 한경태
- RR: Han Gyeongtae
- MR: Han Kyŏngt'ae

Sport
- Sport: Handball

Han Kyung-tai (Korean: 한경태; born 11 April 1975) is a South Korean handball player who competed in the 2004 Summer Olympics and in the 2008 Summer Olympics.
