= Kang Il-koo =

South Korean handball player (born 1976)

Kang Il-Koo (born 26 April 1976) is a South Korean handball goalkeeper who competed in the 2000 Summer Olympics and in the 2008 Summer Olympics. At the tournament in 2000 he had the second best save percentage with 37% behind Swedish Peter Gentzel.

He is married to handballer Oh Yong-ran.
