= Jung Kang-wook =

South Korean handball player (born 1970)

Personal information
- Nationality: South Korean
- Born: 1 May 1970 (age 55)

Sport
- Sport: Handball

Jung Kang-wook (born 1 May 1970) is a South Korean handball player. He competed in the men's tournament at the 1992 Summer Olympics.
