= Kazuhiro Miyashita =

Japanese handball player (born 1961)

Kazuhiro Miyashita (宮下和広, Miyashita Kazuhiro, born 6 August 1961) is a Japanese former handball player who competed in the 1988 Summer Olympics.
