= Moon Byung-wook =

South Korean handball player (born 1970)

Personal information
- Nationality: South Korean
- Born: 18 June 1970 (age 55)

Sport
- Sport: Handball

Moon Byung-wook (born 18 June 1970) is a South Korean handball player. He competed at the 1992 Summer Olympics and the 2000 Summer Olympics.
