= Kaoru Yokoshima =

Japanese handball player (born 1985)

Personal information
- Nationality: Japanese
- Born: 11 December 1985 (age 40)
- Height: 1.62 m (5 ft 4 in)

Sport
- Sport: Handball
- Position: Pivot
- Current club: Hokkoku Bank
National team
Years	Team	Apps	(Gls)
–	Japan	52	(124)

Kaoru Yokoshima (横嶋 かおる, Yokoshima Kaoru; born 11 December 1985) is a Japanese handball player. She plays for the club Hokkoku Bank, and on the Japanese national team. She represented Japan at the 2013 World Women's Handball Championship in Serbia, where the Japanese team placed 14th.
