= Hiroshi Yanai (handballer) =

Japanese handball player (born 1960)

Hiroshi Yanai (born 1 August 1960) is a Japanese former handball player who competed in the 1988 Summer Olympics.
