= Cho Young-shin =

South Korean handball player (born 1967)

- Hangul: 조영신
- RR: Jo Yeongsin
- MR: Cho Yŏngsin

Cho Young-shin (born 20 October 1967) is a South Korean handball coach of the Korean national team. He competed in the men's tournament at the 1992 Summer Olympics.

At the 2012 Summer Olympics, he coached the South Korea national handball team. He has two children, who both attend college in the United States.
