= Kenji Tamamura =

Japanese handball player (born 1961)

Kenji Tamamura (玉村 健次, Tamamura Kenji; born 16 January 1961) is a Japanese former handball player who competed in the 1988 Summer Olympics.
