= Chen Haiyun =

Chinese handball player (born 1973)

Personal information
- Nationality: Chinese
- Born: 6 September 1973 (age 52)

Sport
- Sport: Handball

Chen Haiyun (born 6 September 1973) is a Chinese handball player. She competed in the women's tournament at the 1996 Summer Olympics.
