= Huang Hong (handballer) =

Chinese handball player (born 1980)

Huang Hong (born 1980) is a Chinese team handball player. Playing on the Chinese national team, she competed at the 2008 Summer Olympics in Beijing, where China placed sixth.
