= Oh Yong-ran =

South Korean handball player (born 1972)

Oh Yong-Ran
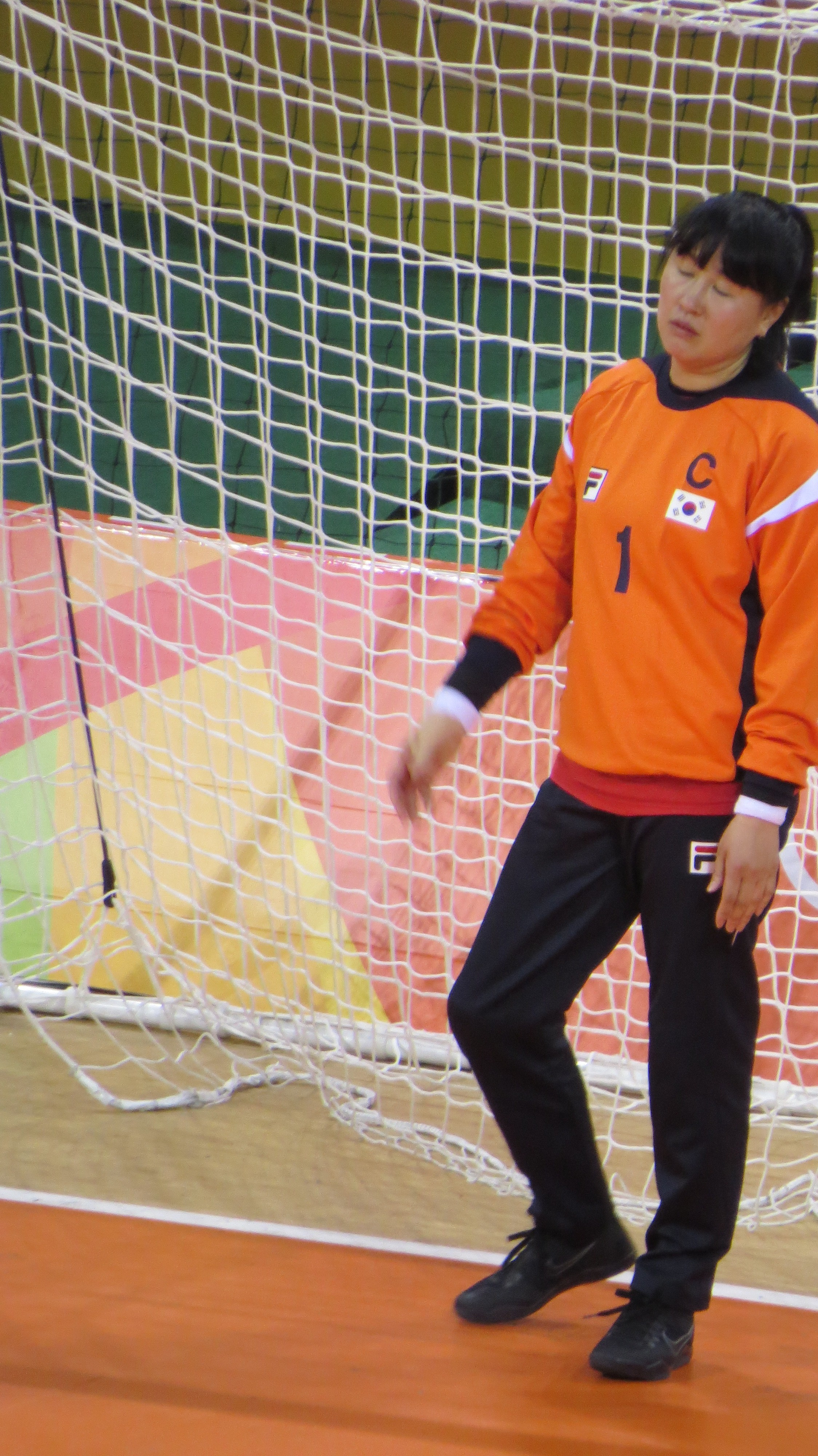
- Yong-Ran in 2016

Personal information
- Nationality: South Korean
- Born: 6 September 1972 (age 54) Osan, South Korea
- Height: 1.71 m (5 ft 7 in)

Sport
- Sport: Handball
- Position: Goalkeeper

Senior clubs
- Years: Team
- –: Hyomyung
- –: Incheon Sports Council
National team
Years	Team	Apps	(Gls)
–	South Korea	104	(1)
Medal record
Silver medal – second place	1996 Atlanta	Team
Silver medal – second place	2004 Athens	Team
Bronze medal – third place	2008 Beijing	Team
World Championship
Gold medal – first place	1995 Austria/Hungary
Bronze medal – third place	2003 Croatia
- Korean name
- Hangul: 오영란
- Hanja: 吳令蘭
- RR: O Yeongran
- MR: O Yŏngnan
- Updated on 2016

Oh Yong-Ran (Korean: 오영란, born 6 September 1972), also spelled as Oh Yeong-Ran, is a South Korean handball player who was part of the South Korea team that won the 1995 World Championship. She also competed in the 1996, 2000, and 2004 Summer Olympics, and won a bronze medal at the 2003 World Women's Handball Championship.

== National team ==
In 1996, Oh was part of the South Korean national team, which won the silver medal. She played four matches, including the final, as goalkeeper.

Four years later Oh was part of the South Korean team which finished fourth in the 2000 Olympic tournament. She played all seven matches as goalkeeper.

At the 2003 World Women's Handball Championship, she won a bronze medal.

In 2004, she won the silver medal with the South Korean team again. She played all seven matches as goalkeeper. Korea lost to Denmark in the final on a penalty shoot out. Oh was South Korea's chosen keeper at the shoot-out, but did not manage to save a single shot, when Denmark won 4-2.

She also participated at the 2008 Olympics, where Korea finished 4th. At the 2016 Olympics, she made a comeback on the South Korean national team. At the tournament Korea finished 10th out of 12.

== Private life ==
She is married to handballer Kang Il-koo.
