= Che Zhihong =

Chinese handball player (born 1975)

Personal information
- Nationality: Chinese
- Born: 16 January 1975 (age 50)

Sport
- Sport: Handball

Che Zhihong (born 16 January 1975) is a Chinese handball player. She competed in the women's tournament at the 1996 Summer Olympics.
