= Li Bing (handballer) =

Chinese handball player (born 1980)

Li Bing (Chinese: 李兵; pinyin: Lǐ Bīng; born January 21, 1980, in Harbin, Heilongjiang) is a female Chinese handball player who competed at the 2004 Summer Olympics.

In 2004, she finished eighth with the Chinese team in the women's competition. She played all seven matches and scored 15 goals.
