= Huh Soon-young =

South Korean handball player (born 1975)

- Hangul: 허순영
- Hanja: 許順榮
- RR: Heo Sunyeong
- MR: Hŏ Sunyŏng

Huh Soon-young
Medal record

Women's handball

Representing South Korea

Olympic Games
Silver medal – second place	1996 Atlanta	Team
Silver medal – second place	2004 Athens	Team
Bronze medal – third place	2008 Beijing	Team

Asian Games
Gold medal – first place	1998 Bangkok	

Huh Soon-Young (Korean: 허순영; born September 28, 1975 in Busan) is a South Korean handball player (line player) who competed in the 1996 Summer Olympics, in the 2000 Summer Olympics, and in the 2004 Summer Olympics.

In 1996 she was part of the South Korean team which won the silver medal. She played one match. Four years later she was part of the South Korean team which finished fourth in the 2000 Olympic tournament. She played all seven matches and scored 17 goals. In 2004, she won the silver medal with the South Korean team again. She played all seven matches and scored 21 goals.

She also won a gold medal for South Korea at the 1998 Asian Games.
