= Yoon Kyung-min =

South Korean handball player (born 1979)

Yoon Kyung-Min (born 31 October 1979) is a Korean handball player who competed in the 2000 Summer Olympics, the 2004 Summer Olympics, the 2007 World Championship, and in the 2008 Summer Olympics. He is a younger brother of Yoon Kyung-shin.
