= Hidetada Ito =

Japanese handball player (born 1959)

Hidetada Ito (井藤 英忠, Itō Hidetada; born 10 March 1959) is a Japanese former handball player who competed in the 1984 Summer Olympics and in the 1988 Summer Olympics.
