= Takashi Taguchi (handballer) =

Japanese handball player (born 1961)

Takashi Taguchi (born 23 July 1961) is a Japanese former handball player who competed in the 1988 Summer Olympics.
