= Lee Suik-houng =

South Korean handball player (born 1971)

Lee Suik-Houng
Personal information
- Nationality: South Korean
- Born: 13 January 1971 (age 55) Daegu, South Korea
- Height: 1.97 m (6 ft 6 in)

Sport
- Sport: Handball
- Position: Goalkeeper
- Current club: Retired

Senior clubs
- Years: Team
- 1989-1992: (South Korea) Wonkwang University Handball
- 1993-1996: (South Korea) Doosan Handball Club
- 1996-1998: (Iceland) FH
- 1998-2000: (Switzerland) HSC Suhr Aarau
- 2000-2001: (Switzerland) Grasshoppers Handball
- 2001-2009: (Switzerland) Wacker Thun
National team
Years	Team	Apps	(Gls)
1995–2007	South Korea	3	(0)
Medal record
Asian Games
Gold medal – first place	1998 Bangkok	Team
- Updated on 13 January 2009

Lee Suik-Houng (Korean: 이석형; born January 13, 1971) is a retired South Korean handball player.

In 1997, Lee participated in the World Men's Handball Championship held in Japan and helped South Korea reach to the quarterfinals. He also competed in the men's tournament at the 2000 Summer Olympics.
