= Park Jung-jin (handballer) =

South Korean handball player (born 1976)

Personal information
- Nationality: South Korean
- Born: 18 March 1976 (age 49)

Sport
- Sport: Handball

Park Jung-jin (born 18 March 1976) is a South Korean handball player. He competed in the men's tournament at the 2000 Summer Olympics.
