= Yukihiro Hashimoto =

Japanese handball player (born 1965)

Yukihiro Hashimoto (橋本行弘, Hashimoto Yukihiro, born 17 September 1965) is a Japanese former handball player who was a goalkeeper.

In 1988 he competed in the 1988 Summer Olympics. He later won three medals at the Asian Games: silver in 1990 in Beijing and in 1994 in Hiroshima and bronze in 1998 in Bangkok.

He also has been one of the best goalkeeper at the 1997 World Championship played in Japan and has then been the third choice in the election of the IHF World Player of the Year in 1997.
