= Back Sang-suh =

South Korean handball player (born 1960)

Personal information
- Nationality: South Korean
- Born: 4 June 1960 (age 65)

Sport
- Sport: Handball

Back Sang-suh (born 4 June 1960) is a South Korean handball player. He competed in the men's tournament at the 1992 Summer Olympics.
