= Cho Bum-yun =

South Korean handball player (born 1971)

Personal information
- Nationality: South Korean
- Born: 16 June 1971 (age 54)

Sport
- Sport: Handball

Cho Bum-yun (born 16 June 1971) is a South Korean handball player. He competed at the 1992 Summer Olympics and the 2000 Summer Olympics.
