= Paek Won-chul =

South Korean handball player (born 1977)

- Hangul: 백원철
- RR: Baek Woncheol
- MR: Paek Wŏnch'ŏl

Paek Won-chul (born 10 January 1977) is a Korean handball player who competed in the 2000 Summer Olympics, in the 2004 Summer Olympics, in the 2008 Summer Olympics and in the 2012 Summer Olympics.
