= Shinichi Shudo =

Japanese handball player (born 1965)

Shinichi Shudo (首藤信一, Shudō Shin'ichi, born 10 January 1965) is a Japanese former handball player who competed in the 1988 Summer Olympics.
