= Kim Hyun-ok (handballer) =

South Korean handball player (born 1974)

- Korean name
- Hangul: 김현옥
- Hanja: 金賢玉
- RR: Gim Hyeonok
- MR: Kim Hyŏnok

Olympic medal record

Women's Handball
Silver medal – second place	2004 Athens	Team

Asian Games
Gold medal – first place	1994 Hiroshima	
Gold medal – first place	1998 Bangkok	
Gold medal – first place	2002 Changwon	

Kim Hyun-Ok (born May 14, 1974) is a South Korean handball player who competed in the 2000 and 2004 Summer Olympics.

In 2000, she was part of the South Korean team which finished fourth in the Olympic tournament. She played all seven matches and scored 28 goals.

Four years later she won the silver medal with the South Korean team. She played one match and scored two goals.

She also won gold medals for South Korea at the 1994, 1998 and 2002 Asian Games.
