= Lee Jae-woo (handballer) =

South Korean handball player (born 1979)

- Hangul: 이재우
- RR: I Jaeu
- MR: I Chaeu

Lee Jae-woo (born 28 September 1979) is a Korean handball player who competed in the 2000 Summer Olympics, in the 2004 Summer Olympics, in the 2008 Summer Olympics and the 2012 Summer Olympics.
