= Lee Ki-ho (handballer) =

South Korean handballer (born 1970)

Lee Ki-ho (born 15 July 1970) is a South Korean retired handballer who played at the 1992 Olympic Games.

In 2017, he coached the SK Sugar Gliders to the Women's Handball Korea League title.
