= Kim Jae-hwan (handballer) =

South Korean handball player (born 1966)

- Korean name
- Hangul: 김재환
- RR: Gim Jaehwan
- MR: Kim Chaehwan

Olympic medal record

Men's Handball
Silver medal – second place	1988 Seoul	Team

Kim Jae-hwan (born February 8, 1966) is a male South Korean former handball player who competed in the 1988 Summer Olympics.

In 1988 he won the silver medal with the South Korean team. He played all six matches and scored 27 goals.
