= South Korea men's national handball team =

South Korea

Information
- Association: Korea Handball Federation
- Coach: Cho Young-shin
- Assistant coach: Lee Se-ok

Colours
1st	2nd

Results

Summer Olympics
- Appearances: 7 (First in 1984)
- Best result: (silver) 2nd (1988)

World Championship
- Appearances: 13 (First in 1986)
- Best result: 8th (1997)

Asian Championship
- Appearances: 20 (First in 1977)
- Best result: (gold) 1st (1983, 1987, 1989, 1991, 1993, 2000, 2008, 2010, 2012)
- Last updated on Unknown.

South Korea men's national handball team
Medal record

Olympic Games
Silver medal – second place	1988 Seoul	Team

Asian Games
Gold medal – first place	1986 Seoul	Team
Gold medal – first place	1990 Beijing	Team
Gold medal – first place	1994 Hiroshima	Team
Gold medal – first place	1998 Bangkok	Team
Gold medal – first place	2002 Busan	Team
Gold medal – first place	2010 Guangzhou	Team
Silver medal – second place	2014 Incheon	Team
Bronze medal – third place	1982 New Delhi	Team
Bronze medal – third place	2018 Jakarta-Palembang	Team

Asian Championship
Gold medal – first place	1983 Seoul	
Gold medal – first place	1987 Amman	
Gold medal – first place	1989 Beijing	
Gold medal – first place	1991 Hiroshima	
Gold medal – first place	1993 Manama	
Gold medal – first place	2000 Kumamoto	
Gold medal – first place	2008 Isfahan	
Gold medal – first place	2010 Beirut	
Gold medal – first place	2012 Jeddah	
Silver medal – second place	1977 Kuwait City	
Silver medal – second place	1995 Kuwait City	
Silver medal – second place	2006 Bangkok	
Silver medal – second place	2020 Kuwait City	
Bronze medal – third place	2018 Suwon	

The South Korea national handball team is the national handball team of South Korea and is controlled by the Korea Handball Federation. They are one of the most successful teams in Asia with a record 9 Continental Championships. They have however not won the title since 2010. They are also the only Asian team to have won medals at the Summer Olympics.

== Competitive record ==
Champions Runners-up

=== Olympic Games ===
Games	Round	Position	Pld	W	D	L	GF	GA	GD
(Germany) 1936 Berlin	did not enter								
Not held from 1948 to 1968
(West Germany) 1972 Munich	did not qualify								
(Canada) 1976 Montreal	did not qualify								
(Soviet Union) 1980 Moscow	did not participate								
(United States) 1984 Los Angeles	Match for 11th place	11th of 12	6	1	1	4	148	178	−30
(South Korea) 1988 Seoul	Runners-up	2nd of 12	6	4	0	2	152	149	+3
(Spain) 1992 Barcelona	Match for 5th place	6th of 12	6	3	0	3	135	153	−18
(United States) 1996 Atlanta	did not qualify								
(Australia) 2000 Sydney	Match for 9th place	9th of 12	6	2	1	3	152	150	+2
(Greece) 2004 Athens	Match for 7th place	8th of 12	8	2	0	6	221	238	−15
(China) 2008 Beijing	Match for 7th place	8th of 12	8	3	0	5	198	224	−26
(United Kingdom) 2012 London	Group stage	11th of 12	5	0	0	5	115	140	−25
(Brazil) 2016 Rio de Janeiro	did not qualify								
(Japan) 2020 Tokyo	did not qualify								
(France) 2024 Paris	did not qualify								
Total	7/15	0 Titles	45	15	2	28	1,121	1,232	−111

=== World Championship ===
Year	Round	Position	GP	W	D	L	GS	GA
(Nazi Germany) 1938	Not a IHF member							
(Sweden) 1954	Not a IHF member							
(East Germany) 1958	Not a IHF member							
(West Germany) 1961	did not enter							
(Czechoslovakia) 1964	did not enter							
(Sweden) 1967	did not enter							
(France) 1970	did not enter							
(East Germany) 1974	did not enter							
(Denmark) 1978	did not enter							
(West Germany) 1982	did not enter							
(Switzerland) 1986	Match for 11th place	12th	7	2	0	5	179	186
(Czechoslovakia) 1990	Match for 11th place	12th	7	1	0	6	167	197
(Sweden) 1993	Ranking round	15th	6	1	1	4	151	167
(Iceland) 1995	Match for 11th place	12th	9	5	0	4	249	220
(Japan) 1997	Match for 7th place	8th	9	4	1	4	233	253
(Egypt) 1999	Round of 16	14th	6	2	0	4	169	153
(France) 2001	Round of 16	12th	6	3	0	3	171	160
(Portugal) 2003	did not qualify							
(Tunisia) 2005	did not qualify							
(Germany) 2007	President's Cup	15th	6	3	1	2	193	187
(Croatia) 2009	Match for 11th place	12th	9	3	0	6	239	239
(Sweden) 2011	President's Cup	13th	7	4	1	2	192	175
(Spain) 2013	President's cup	21st	7	2	0	5	182	189
(Qatar) 2015	did not qualify							
(France) 2017	did not qualify							
(Denmark) (Germany) 2019	President's cup	22nd	7	1	0	6	177	216
(Egypt) 2021	President's cup	31st	7	1	0	6	176	225
(Poland) (Sweden) 2023	President's cup	28th	7	2	0	5	206	227
(Croatia) (Denmark) (Norway) 2025	did not qualify							
(Germany) 2027	to be determined							
Total	13/28		100	34	4	62	2684	2794

- Participated as Unified Korea

=== Asian Games record ===
- 1982 – (bronze) 3rd place
- 1986 – (gold) Champions
- 1990 – (gold) Champions
- 1994 – (gold) Champions
- 1998 – (gold) Champions
- 2002 – (gold) Champions
- 2006 – 4th place
- 2010 – (gold) Champions
- 2014 – (silver) Runners-up
- 2018 – (bronze) 3rd place
- 2022 – 5th place
- 2026 – 4th place

=== Asian Championship ===
- 1977 – (silver) Runners-up
- 1983 – (gold) Champions
- 1987 – (gold) Champions
- 1989 – (gold) Champions
- 1991 – (gold) Champions
- 1993 – (gold) Champions
- 1995 – (silver) Runners-up
- 2000 – (gold) Champions
- 2002 – 4th place
- 2006 – (silver) Runners-up
- 2008 – (gold) Champions
- 2010 – (gold) Champions
- 2012 – (gold) Champions
- 2014 – 5th place
- 2016 – 6th place
- 2018 – (bronze) 3rd place
- 2020 – (silver) Runners-up
- 2022 – 5th place
- 2024 – 5th place
- 2026 – 5th place

== Team ==
=== Current squad ===
Squad for the 2023 World Men's Handball Championship.

Head coach: Rolando Freitas

Assistant Coach: Herlander Silva

No.	Pos.	Name	Date of birth (age)	Height	App.	Goals	Club
3	RW	Shin Jae-seop	5 November 1999 (age 26)	1.83 m	7	54	(South Korea) Hanam Handball Club
7	CB	Kang Jeon-gu	11 May 1990 (age 36)	1.80 m	6	4	(South Korea) Doosan
8	P	Ku Chang-eun	23 December 1993 (age 32)	1.90 m	26	48	(South Korea) Doosan
10	LB	Park Young-jun	28 January 1994 (age 32)	1.88 m	0	0	(South Korea) Incheon Metropolitan City Corporation
11	LW	Jang Dong-hyun	13 January 1995 (age 31)	1.80 m	0	0	(South Korea) SK Hawks
13	RB	Jo Tae-hun	30 June 1991 (age 35)	1.83 m	33	72	(South Korea) Doosan
14	P	Lee Seong-min	14 December 1995 (age 30)	1.92 m	0	0	(South Korea) Doosan
17	RB	Kim Yeon-bin	24 March 1997 (age 29)	1.82 m	0	0	(South Korea) Doosan
26	RW	Kim Jin-young	2 February 2000 (age 26)	1.85 m	8	49	(Spain) CB Ademar León
28	LW	Kim Gi-min	9 August 1994 (age 32)	1.83 m	15	30	(South Korea) SK Hawks
33	RW	Ha Min-ho	23 January 1992 (age 34)	1.90 m	0	0	(South Korea) Incheon Metropolitan City Corporation
34	CB	Oh Ju-an	23 June 1994 (age 32)	1.86 m	0	0	(South Korea) SK Hawks
37	RB	Ha Tae-hyun	15 April 1994 (age 32)	1.88 m	23	107	(South Korea) SK Hawks
66	GK	Kim Dong-wook	19 September 1997 (age 29)	1.92 m	8	0	(South Korea) Doosan
71	LB	Lee Hyeon-sik	16 February 1992 (age 34)	1.85 m	0	0	(South Korea) SK Hawks
77	CB	Lee Yo-seb	27 April 1998 (age 28)	1.75 m	13	31	(South Korea) Korea Armed Forces Athletic Corps
79	P	Park Se-ung	18 March 1998 (age 28)	1.88 m	9	33	(South Korea) SK Hawks
94	GK	Lee Chang-woo	27 April 2003 (age 23)	1.90 m	8	1	(South Korea) Korea National Sport University
97	P	Jin Yu-sung	12 October 2000 (age 26)	1.90 m	0	0	(South Korea) Korea National Sport University
99	GK	Park Jae-yong	20 March 1997 (age 29)	1.92 m	13	0	(South Korea) Korea Armed Forces Athletic Corps

=== Notable players ===
- Yoon Kyung-shin: 2001 World Handball Player of the Year
- Kang Jae-won: 1989 World Handball Player of the Year, six-time MVP of Swiss Bundesliga

== See also ==
- South Korea women's national handball team
