= Handball at the 1998 Asian Games – Women's tournament =

Women at the 1998 Asian Games
- Venue: Srinakharinwirot University
- Date: 9–14 December 1998
- Nations: 6

Medalists
gold medal	South Korea
silver medal	North Korea
bronze medal	Japan

Women's handball at the 1998 Asian Games was held in Srinakharinwirot University, Bangkok from December 9 to December 14, 1998.

== Results ==
All times are Indochina Time (UTC+07:00)

Pos	Team	Pld	W	D	L	GF	GA	GD	Pts
1	South Korea	5	5	0	0	184	93	+91	10
2	North Korea	5	4	0	1	158	126	+32	8
3	Japan	5	2	1	2	137	103	+34	5 (Note: Head-to-head result: JPN 22–22 CHN. Overall goal difference was used as the tiebreaker.)
4	China	5	2	1	2	140	126	+14	5
5	Kazakhstan	5	1	0	4	133	133	0	2
6	Thailand	5	0	0	5	53	224	−171	0

Source: Results
Notes:

9 December; 13:00	South Korea	37–19	Kazakhstan	Srinakharinwirot University, Bangkok
9 December; 13:00		(19–8)		Srinakharinwirot University, Bangkok

9 December; 15:00	Japan	20–26	North Korea	Srinakharinwirot University, Bangkok
9 December; 15:00		(12–14)		Srinakharinwirot University, Bangkok

9 December; 17:00	China	44–11	Thailand	Srinakharinwirot University, Bangkok
9 December; 17:00		(25–5)		Srinakharinwirot University, Bangkok

10 December; 13:00	Kazakhstan	28–30	North Korea	Srinakharinwirot University, Bangkok
10 December; 13:00		(14–16)		Srinakharinwirot University, Bangkok

10 December; 15:00	Thailand	13–52	South Korea	Srinakharinwirot University, Bangkok
10 December; 15:00		(5–29)		Srinakharinwirot University, Bangkok

10 December; 17:00	China	22–22	Japan	Srinakharinwirot University, Bangkok
10 December; 17:00		(9–13)		Srinakharinwirot University, Bangkok

11 December; 13:00	Thailand	6–46	Japan	Srinakharinwirot University, Bangkok
11 December; 13:00		(3–24)		Srinakharinwirot University, Bangkok

11 December; 15:00	Kazakhstan	26–29	China	Srinakharinwirot University, Bangkok
11 December; 15:00		(14–14)		Srinakharinwirot University, Bangkok

11 December; 17:00	South Korea	37–22	North Korea	Srinakharinwirot University, Bangkok
11 December; 17:00		(20–7)		Srinakharinwirot University, Bangkok

12 December; 13:00	North Korea	36–29	China	Srinakharinwirot University, Bangkok
12 December; 13:00		(16–11)		Srinakharinwirot University, Bangkok

12 December; 15:00	Japan	23–27	South Korea	Srinakharinwirot University, Bangkok
12 December; 15:00		(13–15)		Srinakharinwirot University, Bangkok

12 December; 17:00	Kazakhstan	38–11	Thailand	Srinakharinwirot University, Bangkok
12 December; 17:00		(18–5)		Srinakharinwirot University, Bangkok

14 December; 13:00	North Korea	44–12	Thailand	Srinakharinwirot University, Bangkok
14 December; 13:00		(20–7)		Srinakharinwirot University, Bangkok

14 December; 15:00	Japan	26–22	Kazakhstan	Srinakharinwirot University, Bangkok
14 December; 15:00		(11–7)		Srinakharinwirot University, Bangkok

14 December; 17:00	South Korea	31–16	China	Srinakharinwirot University, Bangkok
14 December; 17:00		(18–9)		Srinakharinwirot University, Bangkok

== Final standing ==
Rank	Team	Pld	W	D	L
1st place, gold medalist(s)	South Korea	5	5	0	0
2nd place, silver medalist(s)	North Korea	5	4	0	1
3rd place, bronze medalist(s)	Japan	5	2	1	2
4	China	5	2	1	2
5	Kazakhstan	5	1	0	4
6	Thailand	5	0	0	5
