= Handball at the 2014 Asian Games =

- Venue: Seonhak Handball Gymnasium; Suwon Gymnasium
- Date: 20 September – 2 October 2014
- Competitors: 360 from 18 nations

Handball at the 2014 Asian Games was held in Incheon, South Korea from September 20 to October 2, 2014. In this tournament, 14 teams played in the men's competition, and 9 teams participated in the women's competition.

== Schedule ==
P	Preliminary round	S	Second round	C	Classification	½	Semifinals	F	Finals

Event↓/Date →	20th Sat	21st Sun	22nd Mon	23rd Tue	24th Wed	25th Thu	26th Fri	27th Sat	28th Sun	29th Mon	30th Tue	1st Wed	2nd Thu
Men	P	P	P		S	S	S		C	½			F
Women	P	P	P		P	P			½		C	F	

== Medalists ==
Event	Gold	Silver	Bronze
Men	Qatar; Hamdi Missaoui; Ameen Zakkar; Hassan Mabrouk; Bertrand Roiné; Rafael Capote; Abdulla Al-Karbi; Abdulrazzaq Murad; Yousuf Al-Abdulla; Eldar Memišević; Goran Stojanović; Borja Vidal; Kamalaldin Mallash; Youssef Benali; Hamad Madadi; Hadi Hamdoon; Mahmoud Hassaballa	South Korea; Jeong Yi-kyeong; Sim Jae-bok; Park Kyung-suk; Yu Dong-geun; Jung Su-young; Park Jung-geu; Lee Sang-uk; Lim Duk-jun; Oh Yun-suk; Lee Dong-myung; Hwang Do-yeop; Yoon Ci-yoel; Lee Hyeon-sik; Lee Eun-ho; Eom Hyo-won; Lee Chang-woo	Bahrain; Ali Abdulla Eid; Mahmood Abdulqader; Hasan Al-Fardan; Hasan Al-Samahiji; Jaafar Abdulqader; Sadiq Ali; Mahdi Madan; Mohamed Merza; Mohamed Abdulhusain; Mohamed Al-Maqabi; Jasim Radhi; Jasim Al-Salatna; Husain Ali; Ali Merza; Ali Abdulqader; Husain Al-Sayyad
Women	South Korea; Park Sae-young; Kim Seon-hwa; Jung Yu-ra; Won Seon-pil; Ryu Eun-hee; Park Mi-ra; Yoo Hyun-ji; Kim Jin-yi; Choi Su-min; Song Mi-young; Sim Hae-in; Jung Ji-hae; Kim On-a; Lee Eun-bi; Woo Sun-hee; Gwon Han-na	Japan; Kimiko Hida; Megumi Honda; Mikako Ishino; Arata Nishikiori; Kaoru Yokoshima; Chie Katsuren; Aya Yokoshima; Yui Sunami; Sato Shiroishi; Yuko Arihama; Mayuko Ishitate; Rino Aizawa; Kaori Fujima; Nozomi Hara; Shiori Nagata; Anri Matsumura	Kazakhstan; Yevgeniya Tsupenkova; Rizagul Mukanova; Olga Tankina; Marina Pikalova; Viktoriya Kolotinskaya; Xeniya Volnukhina; Anastassiya Rodina; Yelena Suyazova; Tatyana Parfenova; Natalya Ilyina; Irina Alexandrova; Irina Danilova; Yelena Klimenko; Polina Mikhailova; Kristina Kapralova

== Medal table ==
Rank	Nation	Gold	Silver	Bronze	Total
1	South Korea (KOR)	1	1	0	2
2	Qatar (QAT)	1	0	0	1
3	Japan (JPN)	0	1	0	1
4	Bahrain (BRN)	0	0	1	1
4	Kazakhstan (KAZ)	0	0	1	1
Totals (5 entries)		2	2	2	6

== Draw ==
A draw ceremony was held on 21 August 2014 to determine the groups for the men's and women's competitions. The teams were seeded based on their final ranking at the 2010 Asian Games. South Korean teams were not seeded as they could choose their groups.

=== Men ===
Group A

- Saudi Arabia (4)
- Bahrain (6)
- Mongolia

Group B

- Iran (2)
- Kuwait (8)
- Hong Kong

Group C

- Qatar (5)
- China (7)
- Oman
- United Arab Emirates

Group D

- Japan (3)
- India (9)
- South Korea (Host)
- Chinese Taipei

=== Women ===
Group A

- China (1)
- Thailand (7)
- India
- South Korea (Host)

Group B

- Japan (2)
- Kazakhstan (4)
- Hong Kong
- Maldives
- Uzbekistan

== Final standing ==
=== Men ===
Rank	Team	Pld	W	D	L
1st place, gold medalist(s)	Qatar	8	8	0	0
2nd place, silver medalist(s)	South Korea	8	7	0	1
3rd place, bronze medalist(s)	Bahrain	7	5	0	2
4	Iran	7	3	0	4
5	Kuwait	6	3	0	3
6	Oman	7	3	0	4
7	Saudi Arabia	6	3	0	3
8	Chinese Taipei	7	2	0	5
9	Japan	6	4	0	2
10	China	6	3	0	3
11	Hong Kong	5	1	0	4
12	Mongolia	5	0	0	5
13	United Arab Emirates	4	1	0	3
14	India	4	0	0	4

=== Women ===
Rank	Team	Pld	W	D	L
1st place, gold medalist(s)	South Korea	5	5	0	0
2nd place, silver medalist(s)	Japan	6	5	0	1
3rd place, bronze medalist(s)	Kazakhstan	6	4	0	2
4	China	5	2	0	3
5	Uzbekistan	6	4	0	2
6	Hong Kong	6	2	0	4
7	Thailand	5	0	2	3
8	India	5	0	2	3
9	Maldives	4	0	0	4
