= Handball at the 2014 Asian Games – Men's tournament =

Men at the 2014 Asian Games
- Venue: Seonhak Handball Gymnasium
- Date: 20 September – 2 October 2014
- Competitors: 219 from 14 nations

Medalists
gold medal	Qatar
silver medal	South Korea
bronze medal	Bahrain

Men's handball at the 2014 Asian Games was held in Incheon, South Korea from September 20 to October 2, 2014.

Qatar won the tournament thanks to a final victory against South Korea.

== Squads ==
Bahrain	China	Chinese Taipei	Hong Kong
Ali Abdulla Eid; Mahmood Abdulqader; Hasan Al-Fardan; Hasan Al-Samahiji; Jaafar Abdulqader; Sadiq Ali; Mahdi Madan; Mohamed Merza; Mohamed Abdulhusain; Mohamed Al-Maqabi; Jasim Radhi; Jasim Al-Salatna; Husain Ali; Ali Merza; Ali Abdulqader; Husain Al-Sayyad	Wu Longrui; Zhao Xin; Zhou Xiaojian; Li Yuqing; Cong Lin; Li Hexin; Li An; Wang Quan; Wang Xudong; Jiang Weiyi; Yu Yanjiang; Wang Wei; Song Pengqiang; Pan Xiang; Yang Fan	Hsu Ming-hung; Weng Chia-wei; Huang Hsin-wei; Lee Cheng-han; Cheng Hsu-hung; Huang Chang-jung; Chen Chun-fu; Chao Hsien-chang; Chiu Yi-fan; Wang Cheng-hsien; Wu Ping-hui; Wang Chih-jen; Hsu Hsien-ming; Hsu Chih-kun; Wang Hui-hsiung; Chen Yi-chiao	Addy Ip; Ho Wai Kit; Lau Kin Pan; Wong Shing Yip; Kelvin Cheung; Tse Wing Fai; Lau Wang Kei; Eddy Ip; Wong Ka Yu; Yuen Hei Yin; Lee Hing Ho; Chan Chun Ho; Hui Man Pong; Kuo Sze Ming; Lin Ming Fai; Siu Chi Ting
India	Iran	Japan	Kuwait
Atul Kumar; Manish Kumar; Firoz Ahmad Khan; Lalit Kumar; Neeraj Singh; Satish Panwar; Manpreet Singh Bassi; Binu Vasu; Hardev Singh; Sunil Kumar; Sachin Bhardwaj; Nittin Sharma; Greenidge D'Cunha; Mahesh Vijay Ugile; Avin Khatkar; Rakesh Kumar	Abbas Asadzadeh; Iman Ehsannejad; Mohammad Reza Rajabi; Shahoo Nosrati; Pouya Norouzinejad; Alireza Mousavi; Saeid Pourghasemi; Mehdi Mousavi; Salaman Barbat; Mohsen Babasafari; Mojtaba Karamian; Ehsan Abouei; Amin Kazemi; Saeid Heidarirad; Mehrdad Samsami; Omid Sekenari	Masatake Kimura; Jun Mori; Kota Ozawa; Kairi Kochi; Daisuke Miyazaki; Jin Watanabe; Izuru Ishikawa; Hiroki Shida; Yuki Kubo; Takashi Kato; Hiroki Motoki; Kohei Narita; Yoshiaki Nomura; Hidenori Kishigawa; Hideaki Chijiwa; Daichi Komuro	Mubarak Al-Zaid; Ibrahim Al-Ameer; Abdullah Al-Khamees; Saleh Al-Musawi; Mutlaq Al-Dousery; Mohammad Al-Kaheeli; Salem Maher; Ali Al-Khedher; Ahmad Al-Enezi; Sameh Al-Hajeri; Waleed Al-Jumaz; Saud Al-Dhuwaihi; Yousef Al-Haddad; Waleed Al-Qallaf; Ali Safar
Mongolia	Oman	Qatar	Saudi Arabia
Baasantsoogiin Badamsed; Nasanjargalyn Ganchödör; Battuyaagiin Darkhanbaatar; Batbayaryn Belgütei; Khangain Narangerel; Dashdulamyn Badral; Sünjidmaagiin Nyamdorj; Gotovyn Tsengüünbayar; Battüvshingiin Mönkhbileg; Lkhagvatserengiin Zagdsüren; Duliin Erdene-Ochir; Pürevdorjiin Yumchindorj; Batsaikhany Baatarsüren; Dashdelgeriin Tsogtbayar	Hamed Al-Dughaishi; Imad Al-Dughaishi; Ahmed Al-Hinai; Marwan Al-Dughaishi; Muneer Al-Bulushi; Hassan Al-Jabri; Hussain Al-Hasani; Hani Al-Dughaishi; Said Al-Hasani; Mahir Al-Dughaishi; Mahmood Al-Harthi; Azan Al-Azan; Hussain Al-Jabri; Nasr Al-Tamtami; Asad Al-Hasani; Haitham Al-Bulushi	Hamdi Missaoui; Ameen Zakkar; Hassan Mabrouk; Bertrand Roiné; Rafael Capote; Abdulla Al-Karbi; Abdulrazzaq Murad; Yousuf Al-Abdulla; Eldar Memišević; Goran Stojanović; Borja Vidal; Kamalaldin Mallash; Youssef Benali; Hamad Madadi; Hadi Hamdoon; Mahmoud Hassaballa	Abdullah Al-Abbas; Hussain Al-Mohsin; Abdullah Al-Hammad; Ahmed Hazazi; Mustafa Al-Habib; Mohammed Al-Salem; Mohammed Al-Nassfan; Mahdi Al-Salem; Hisham Al-Obaidi; Siraj Al-Zaer; Fareed Al-Harbi; Rami Al-Mutairi; Mustafa Al-Makhlouq; Mohammed Al-Zaer; Hussain Al-Hannabi
South Korea	United Arab Emirates		
Jeong Yi-kyeong; Sim Jae-bok; Park Kyung-suk; Yu Dong-geun; Jung Su-young; Park Jung-geu; Lee Sang-uk; Lim Duk-jun; Oh Yun-suk; Lee Dong-myung; Hwang Do-yeop; Yoon Ci-yoel; Lee Hyeon-sik; Lee Eun-ho; Eom Hyo-won; Lee Chang-woo	Shehab Al-Balooshi; Marzooq Al-Balooshi; Rahma Al-Mansoori; Mohamed Al-Taher; Mohamed Saeed Mubarak; Ahmed Al-Khalifi; Khalid Ramadhan; Ahmed Al-Dhanhani; Mohamed Hassan Al-Balooshi; Ahmed Mohamed Abdulla; Khamis Al-Suwaidi; Tariq Al-Maazmi; Waheed Al-Balooshi; Abdulhameed Al-Jneibi; Sultan Al-Mutawa; Mohamed Abdulqader		

== Results ==
All times are Korea Standard Time (UTC+09:00)

=== Preliminary round ===
==== Group A ====
Pos	Team	Pld	W	D	L	GF	GA	GD	Pts	Qualification
1	Bahrain	2	2	0	0	83	34	+49	4	Main round
2	Saudi Arabia	2	1	0	1	71	38	+33	2	Main round
3	Mongolia	2	0	0	2	26	108	−82	0	Classification round 9–12

Source: Results

20 September; 12:00	Bahrain	57–14	Mongolia	Seonhak Handball Gymnasium, Incheon; Referees: Mei, Yin (CHN)
20 September; 12:00	M. Abdulqader 8	(31–6)	six players 2	Seonhak Handball Gymnasium, Incheon; Referees: Mei, Yin (CHN)
20 September; 12:00	2× (yellow card) 2× (suspension)		4× (yellow card) 5× (suspension)	Seonhak Handball Gymnasium, Incheon; Referees: Mei, Yin (CHN)

21 September; 10:00	Mongolia	12–51	Saudi Arabia	Seonhak Handball Gymnasium, Incheon; Referees: LEE (KOR), Zohari (UAE)
21 September; 10:00	Badral, Nyamdorj, Erdene-Ochir 3	(5–27)	Al-Abbas 11	Seonhak Handball Gymnasium, Incheon; Referees: LEE (KOR), Zohari (UAE)
21 September; 10:00	3× (yellow card) 1× (suspension) 1× (red card)		3× (yellow card) 1× (suspension)	Seonhak Handball Gymnasium, Incheon; Referees: LEE (KOR), Zohari (UAE)

22 September; 12:00	Saudi Arabia	20–26	Bahrain	Seonhak Handball Gymnasium, Incheon; Referees: Ikebuchi, Hizaki (JPN)
22 September; 12:00	Al-Mohsin 6	(6–11)	Al-Sayyad 7	Seonhak Handball Gymnasium, Incheon; Referees: Ikebuchi, Hizaki (JPN)
22 September; 12:00	4× (yellow card) 3× (suspension) 1× (red card)		4× (yellow card) 7× (suspension)	Seonhak Handball Gymnasium, Incheon; Referees: Ikebuchi, Hizaki (JPN)

==== Group B ====
Pos	Team	Pld	W	D	L	GF	GA	GD	Pts	Qualification
1	Iran	2	2	0	0	70	35	+35	4	Main round
2	Kuwait	2	1	0	1	65	49	+16	2	Main round
3	Hong Kong	2	0	0	2	30	81	−51	0	Classification round 9–12

Source: Results

20 September; 16:00	Kuwait	40–20	Hong Kong	Seonhak Handball Gymnasium, Incheon; Referees: Lee, Koo (KOR)
20 September; 16:00	Al-Musawi 7	(22–11)	E. Ip 5	Seonhak Handball Gymnasium, Incheon; Referees: Lee, Koo (KOR)
20 September; 16:00	3× (yellow card) 5× (suspension)		2× (yellow card) 6× (suspension)	Seonhak Handball Gymnasium, Incheon; Referees: Lee, Koo (KOR)

21 September; 12:00	Hong Kong	10–41	Iran	Seonhak Handball Gymnasium, Incheon; Referees: Ikebuchi, Hizaki (JPN)
21 September; 12:00	Ho, Cheung, Lee 2	(7–22)	Sekenari 9	Seonhak Handball Gymnasium, Incheon; Referees: Ikebuchi, Hizaki (JPN)
21 September; 12:00	2× (yellow card) 2× (suspension)		2× (yellow card) 2× (suspension)	Seonhak Handball Gymnasium, Incheon; Referees: Ikebuchi, Hizaki (JPN)

22 September; 10:00	Iran	29–25	Kuwait	Seonhak Handball Gymnasium, Incheon; Referees: Lee, Koo (KOR)
22 September; 10:00	Sekenari 10	(15–16)	Al-Dhuwaihi 7	Seonhak Handball Gymnasium, Incheon; Referees: Lee, Koo (KOR)
22 September; 10:00	3× (yellow card) 4× (suspension)		4× (yellow card) 3× (suspension) 1× (red card)	Seonhak Handball Gymnasium, Incheon; Referees: Lee, Koo (KOR)

==== Group C ====
Pos	Team	Pld	W	D	L	GF	GA	GD	Pts	Qualification
1	Qatar	3	3	0	0	93	50	+43	6	Main round
2	Oman	3	2	0	1	79	74	+5	4	Main round
3	China	3	1	0	2	66	89	−23	2	Classification round 9–12
4	United Arab Emirates	3	0	0	3	55	80	−25	0	Classification 13th–14th

Source: Results

20 September; 18:00	Qatar	31–19	Oman	Seonhak Handball Gymnasium, Incheon; Referees: Ikebuchi, Hizaki (JPN)
20 September; 18:00	Hamdoon 5	(15–9)	I. Al-Dughaishi, Al-Tamtami, H. Al-Bulushi 4	Seonhak Handball Gymnasium, Incheon; Referees: Ikebuchi, Hizaki (JPN)
20 September; 18:00	3× (yellow card) 2× (suspension)		2× (yellow card) 4× (suspension)	Seonhak Handball Gymnasium, Incheon; Referees: Ikebuchi, Hizaki (JPN)

20 September; 20:00	China	25–22	United Arab Emirates	Seonhak Handball Gymnasium, Incheon; Referees: Al-Suwailam, Al-Mutawa (KUW)
20 September; 20:00	Li A. 8	(14–9)	S. Al-Balooshi 5	Seonhak Handball Gymnasium, Incheon; Referees: Al-Suwailam, Al-Mutawa (KUW)
20 September; 20:00	3× (yellow card) 6× (suspension)		3× (yellow card) 5× (suspension)	Seonhak Handball Gymnasium, Incheon; Referees: Al-Suwailam, Al-Mutawa (KUW)

21 September; 18:00	United Arab Emirates	15–27	Qatar	Seonhak Handball Gymnasium, Incheon; Referees: Kolahdouzan, Mousavian (IRI)
21 September; 18:00	Mubarak 5	(7–15)	Murad 8	Seonhak Handball Gymnasium, Incheon; Referees: Kolahdouzan, Mousavian (IRI)
21 September; 18:00	4× (yellow card) 2× (suspension)		3× (yellow card) 3× (suspension) 1× (red card)	Seonhak Handball Gymnasium, Incheon; Referees: Kolahdouzan, Mousavian (IRI)

21 September; 20:00	Oman	32–25	China	Seonhak Handball Gymnasium, Incheon; Referees: Al-Marhoon, Al-Mawt (BHR)
21 September; 20:00	A. Al-Hasani 11	(16–14)	Zhao 6	Seonhak Handball Gymnasium, Incheon; Referees: Al-Marhoon, Al-Mawt (BHR)
21 September; 20:00	3× (yellow card) 2× (suspension)		2× (yellow card) 4× (suspension)	Seonhak Handball Gymnasium, Incheon; Referees: Al-Marhoon, Al-Mawt (BHR)

22 September; 14:00	United Arab Emirates	18–28	Oman	Seonhak Handball Gymnasium, Incheon; Referees: Al-Marhoon, Al-Mawt (BHR)
22 September; 14:00	S. Al-Balooshi 5	(9–12)	A. Al-Hasani 8	Seonhak Handball Gymnasium, Incheon; Referees: Al-Marhoon, Al-Mawt (BHR)
22 September; 14:00	2× (yellow card) 3× (suspension)		3× (yellow card) 6× (suspension)	Seonhak Handball Gymnasium, Incheon; Referees: Al-Marhoon, Al-Mawt (BHR)

22 September; 18:00	China	16–35	Qatar	Seonhak Handball Gymnasium, Incheon; Referees: Kolahdouzan, Mousavian (IRI)
22 September; 18:00	Li A. 6	(6–16)	Madadi 5	Seonhak Handball Gymnasium, Incheon; Referees: Kolahdouzan, Mousavian (IRI)
22 September; 18:00	3× (yellow card) 5× (suspension)		3× (yellow card) 6× (suspension)	Seonhak Handball Gymnasium, Incheon; Referees: Kolahdouzan, Mousavian (IRI)

==== Group D ====
Pos	Team	Pld	W	D	L	GF	GA	GD	Pts	Qualification
1	South Korea	3	3	0	0	97	57	+40	6	Main round
2	Chinese Taipei	3	2	0	1	84	75	+9	4	Main round
3	Japan	3	1	0	2	99	74	+25	2	Classification round 9–12
4	India	3	0	0	3	51	125	−74	0	Classification 13th–14th

Source: Results

20 September; 10:00	India	20–39	Chinese Taipei	Seonhak Handball Gymnasium, Incheon; Referees: Shakir, Kadhim (IRQ)
20 September; 10:00	Ugile 5	(11–24)	Chiu 8	Seonhak Handball Gymnasium, Incheon; Referees: Shakir, Kadhim (IRQ)
20 September; 10:00	3× (yellow card) 3× (suspension)		3× (yellow card) 1× (suspension)	Seonhak Handball Gymnasium, Incheon; Referees: Shakir, Kadhim (IRQ)

20 September; 14:00	Japan	24–31	South Korea	Seonhak Handball Gymnasium, Incheon; Referees: Kolahdouzan, Mousavian (IRI)
20 September; 14:00	Miyazaki 4	(11–17)	Eom 9	Seonhak Handball Gymnasium, Incheon; Referees: Kolahdouzan, Mousavian (IRI)
20 September; 14:00	3× (yellow card) 3× (suspension)		3× (yellow card) 6× (suspension)	Seonhak Handball Gymnasium, Incheon; Referees: Kolahdouzan, Mousavian (IRI)

21 September; 14:00	Chinese Taipei	31–28	Japan	Seonhak Handball Gymnasium, Incheon; Referees: Al-Mutawa, Al-Suwailam (KUW)
21 September; 14:00	Chiu 8	(15–15)	Miyazaki 4	Seonhak Handball Gymnasium, Incheon; Referees: Al-Mutawa, Al-Suwailam (KUW)
21 September; 14:00	2× (yellow card) 2× (suspension)		3× (yellow card) 2× (suspension)	Seonhak Handball Gymnasium, Incheon; Referees: Al-Mutawa, Al-Suwailam (KUW)

21 September; 16:00	South Korea	39–19	India	Seonhak Handball Gymnasium, Incheon; Referees: Mei, Yin (CHN)
21 September; 16:00	Lee H. 8	(21–6)	Panwar 4	Seonhak Handball Gymnasium, Incheon; Referees: Mei, Yin (CHN)
21 September; 16:00	3× (yellow card) 1× (suspension)		3× (yellow card) 1× (suspension)	Seonhak Handball Gymnasium, Incheon; Referees: Mei, Yin (CHN)

22 September; 16:00	Chinese Taipei	14–27	South Korea	Seonhak Handball Gymnasium, Incheon; Referees: Al-Mutawa, Al-Suwailam (KUW)
22 September; 16:00	Chao 3	(10–13)	Eom 7	Seonhak Handball Gymnasium, Incheon; Referees: Al-Mutawa, Al-Suwailam (KUW)
22 September; 16:00	3× (yellow card) 2× (suspension)		2× (yellow card) 2× (suspension)	Seonhak Handball Gymnasium, Incheon; Referees: Al-Mutawa, Al-Suwailam (KUW)

22 September; 20:00	India	12–47	Japan	Seonhak Handball Gymnasium, Incheon; Referees: Lee, Lee (KOR)
22 September; 20:00	D'Cunha 3	(6–21)	Miyazaki 10	Seonhak Handball Gymnasium, Incheon; Referees: Lee, Lee (KOR)
22 September; 20:00	1× (yellow card) 3× (suspension)		3× (yellow card) 3× (suspension)	Seonhak Handball Gymnasium, Incheon; Referees: Lee, Lee (KOR)

=== Classification 13th–14th ===
28 September; 10:00	India	25–32	United Arab Emirates	Seonhak Handball Gymnasium, Incheon; Referees: Mei, Yin (CHN)
28 September; 10:00	Bassi, Khatkar 7	(13–17)	Al-Dhanhani 6	Seonhak Handball Gymnasium, Incheon; Referees: Mei, Yin (CHN)
28 September; 10:00	3× (yellow card) 1× (suspension)		3× (yellow card) 4× (suspension)	Seonhak Handball Gymnasium, Incheon; Referees: Mei, Yin (CHN)

=== Classification round 9–12 ===
Pos	Team	Pld	W	D	L	GF	GA	GD	Pts
1	Japan	3	3	0	0	123	54	+69	6
2	China	3	2	0	1	104	67	+37	4
3	Hong Kong	3	1	0	2	72	90	−18	2
4	Mongolia	3	0	0	3	37	125	−88	0

Source: Results

24 September; 10:00	Japan	50–6	Mongolia	Seonhak Handball Gymnasium, Incheon; Referees: Lee, Lee (KOR)
24 September; 10:00	Narita 9	(20–3)	Mönkhbileg 4	Seonhak Handball Gymnasium, Incheon; Referees: Lee, Lee (KOR)
24 September; 10:00	2× (yellow card) 4× (suspension)		3× (yellow card) 9× (suspension)	Seonhak Handball Gymnasium, Incheon; Referees: Lee, Lee (KOR)

24 September; 12:00	China	30–23	Hong Kong	Seonhak Handball Gymnasium, Incheon; Referees: Ota, Shimajiri (JPN)
24 September; 12:00	Zhao 8	(16–12)	Wong S., Hui 6	Seonhak Handball Gymnasium, Incheon; Referees: Ota, Shimajiri (JPN)
24 September; 12:00	3× (yellow card) 2× (suspension)		2× (yellow card) 5× (suspension)	Seonhak Handball Gymnasium, Incheon; Referees: Ota, Shimajiri (JPN)

25 September; 10:00	Hong Kong	17–41	Japan	Seonhak Handball Gymnasium, Incheon; Referees: Shakir, Kadhim (IRQ)
25 September; 10:00	Lin 5	(8–24)	Ishikawa 7	Seonhak Handball Gymnasium, Incheon; Referees: Shakir, Kadhim (IRQ)
25 September; 10:00	2× (yellow card)		3× (yellow card) 2× (suspension)	Seonhak Handball Gymnasium, Incheon; Referees: Shakir, Kadhim (IRQ)

25 September; 12:00	Mongolia	12–43	China	Seonhak Handball Gymnasium, Incheon; Referees: Lee, Lee (KOR)
25 September; 12:00	Baatarsüren 4	(5–20)	Wu 10	Seonhak Handball Gymnasium, Incheon; Referees: Lee, Lee (KOR)
25 September; 12:00	3× (yellow card) 4× (suspension)		2× (yellow card) 2× (suspension)	Seonhak Handball Gymnasium, Incheon; Referees: Lee, Lee (KOR)

26 September; 10:00	Japan	32–31	China	Seonhak Handball Gymnasium, Incheon; Referees: Shakir, Kadhim (IRQ)
26 September; 10:00	Shida 8	(20–17)	Wang X., Yu 7	Seonhak Handball Gymnasium, Incheon; Referees: Shakir, Kadhim (IRQ)
26 September; 10:00	3× (yellow card) 1× (suspension)		3× (yellow card) 5× (suspension)	Seonhak Handball Gymnasium, Incheon; Referees: Shakir, Kadhim (IRQ)

26 September; 12:00	Mongolia	19–32	Hong Kong	Seonhak Handball Gymnasium, Incheon; Referees: Outyana, Nuangthanee (THA)
26 September; 12:00	Baatarsüren 6	(7–18)	Wong S. 6	Seonhak Handball Gymnasium, Incheon; Referees: Outyana, Nuangthanee (THA)
26 September; 12:00	3× (yellow card) 4× (suspension)		3× (yellow card)	Seonhak Handball Gymnasium, Incheon; Referees: Outyana, Nuangthanee (THA)

=== Main round ===
==== Group 1 ====
Pos	Team	Pld	W	D	L	GF	GA	GD	Pts	Qualification
1	Qatar	3	3	0	0	82	59	+23	6	Semifinals
2	Bahrain	3	2	0	1	79	75	+4	4	Semifinals
3	Kuwait	3	1	0	2	72	74	−2	2	Classification 5th–6th
4	Chinese Taipei	3	0	0	3	67	92	−25	0	Classification 7th–8th

Source: Results

24 September; 14:00	Chinese Taipei	25–34	Bahrain	Seonhak Handball Gymnasium, Incheon; Referees: Lee, Koo (KOR)
24 September; 14:00	Wang H. 7	(13–13)	Al-Maqabi, Al-Sayyad 8	Seonhak Handball Gymnasium, Incheon; Referees: Lee, Koo (KOR)
24 September; 14:00	3× (yellow card) 3× (suspension)		3× (yellow card) 7× (suspension)	Seonhak Handball Gymnasium, Incheon; Referees: Lee, Koo (KOR)

24 September; 20:00	Qatar	25–21	Kuwait	Seonhak Handball Gymnasium, Incheon; Referees: Ikebuchi, Hizaki (JPN)
24 September; 20:00	Madadi 5	(16–11)	Al-Hajeri 5	Seonhak Handball Gymnasium, Incheon; Referees: Ikebuchi, Hizaki (JPN)
24 September; 20:00	4× (yellow card) 3× (suspension)		4× (yellow card) 4× (suspension)	Seonhak Handball Gymnasium, Incheon; Referees: Ikebuchi, Hizaki (JPN)

25 September; 14:00	Kuwait	29–23	Chinese Taipei	Seonhak Handball Gymnasium, Incheon; Referees: Kolahdouzan, Mousavian (IRI)
25 September; 14:00	Al-Khamees 10	(13–12)	Chiu 8	Seonhak Handball Gymnasium, Incheon; Referees: Kolahdouzan, Mousavian (IRI)
25 September; 14:00	3× (yellow card) 2× (suspension)		3× (yellow card) 4× (suspension)	Seonhak Handball Gymnasium, Incheon; Referees: Kolahdouzan, Mousavian (IRI)

25 September; 20:00	Bahrain	19–28	Qatar	Seonhak Handball Gymnasium, Incheon; Referees: Kolahdouzan, Mousavian (IRI)
25 September; 20:00	Al-Samahiji 5	(11–13)	Capote 8	Seonhak Handball Gymnasium, Incheon; Referees: Kolahdouzan, Mousavian (IRI)
25 September; 20:00	3× (yellow card) 4× (suspension) 1× (red card)		3× (yellow card) 7× (suspension)	Seonhak Handball Gymnasium, Incheon; Referees: Kolahdouzan, Mousavian (IRI)

26 September; 14:00	Chinese Taipei	19–29	Qatar	Seonhak Handball Gymnasium, Incheon; Referees: Mei, Yin (CHN)
26 September; 14:00	Chiu 7	(11–11)	Hassaballa 6	Seonhak Handball Gymnasium, Incheon; Referees: Mei, Yin (CHN)
26 September; 14:00	3× (yellow card) 1× (suspension)		3× (yellow card) 1× (suspension)	Seonhak Handball Gymnasium, Incheon; Referees: Mei, Yin (CHN)

26 September; 20:00	Bahrain	26–22	Kuwait	Seonhak Handball Gymnasium, Incheon; Referees: Ikebuchi, Hizaki (JPN)
26 September; 20:00	S. Ali 5	(10–14)	Al-Dhuwaihi 7	Seonhak Handball Gymnasium, Incheon; Referees: Ikebuchi, Hizaki (JPN)
26 September; 20:00	4× (yellow card) 4× (suspension)		4× (yellow card) 3× (suspension) 1× (red card)	Seonhak Handball Gymnasium, Incheon; Referees: Ikebuchi, Hizaki (JPN)

==== Group 2 ====
Pos	Team	Pld	W	D	L	GF	GA	GD	Pts	Qualification
1	South Korea	3	3	0	0	77	63	+14	6	Semifinals
2	Iran	3	1	0	2	72	72	0	2 (Note: Tied on head-to-head points (2). Head-to-head goal difference: IRI +4, OMA −1, KSA −3.)	Semifinals
3	Oman	3	1	0	2	79	86	−7	2	Classification 5th–6th
4	Saudi Arabia	3	1	0	2	70	77	−7	2	Classification 7th–8th

Source: Results
Notes:

24 September; 16:00	South Korea	22–18	Saudi Arabia	Seonhak Handball Gymnasium, Incheon; Referees: Al-Marhoon, Al-Mawt (BHR)
24 September; 16:00	Lee E. 6	(12–10)	Al-Mohsin 5	Seonhak Handball Gymnasium, Incheon; Referees: Al-Marhoon, Al-Mawt (BHR)
24 September; 16:00	3× (yellow card) 6× (suspension)		3× (yellow card) 6× (suspension)	Seonhak Handball Gymnasium, Incheon; Referees: Al-Marhoon, Al-Mawt (BHR)

24 September; 18:00	Oman	26–25	Iran	Seonhak Handball Gymnasium, Incheon; Referees: Al-Suwailam, Al-Mutawa (KUW)
24 September; 18:00	A. Al-Hasani 6	(11–14)	Sekenari 7	Seonhak Handball Gymnasium, Incheon; Referees: Al-Suwailam, Al-Mutawa (KUW)
24 September; 18:00	3× (yellow card) 3× (suspension) 1× (red card)		3× (yellow card) 1× (suspension)	Seonhak Handball Gymnasium, Incheon; Referees: Al-Suwailam, Al-Mutawa (KUW)

25 September; 16:00	Iran	21–25	South Korea	Seonhak Handball Gymnasium, Incheon; Referees: Ikebuchi, Hizaki (JPN)
25 September; 16:00	Abouei 6	(11–11)	Eom 6	Seonhak Handball Gymnasium, Incheon; Referees: Ikebuchi, Hizaki (JPN)
25 September; 16:00	3× (yellow card) 1× (suspension)		2× (yellow card) 4× (suspension)	Seonhak Handball Gymnasium, Incheon; Referees: Ikebuchi, Hizaki (JPN)

25 September; 18:00	Saudi Arabia	31–29	Oman	Seonhak Handball Gymnasium, Incheon; Referees: Al-Suwailam, Al-Mutawa (KUW)
25 September; 18:00	Al-Abbas 9	(19–15)	A. Al-Hasani 14	Seonhak Handball Gymnasium, Incheon; Referees: Al-Suwailam, Al-Mutawa (KUW)
25 September; 18:00	4× (yellow card) 5× (suspension)		3× (yellow card) 7× (suspension)	Seonhak Handball Gymnasium, Incheon; Referees: Al-Suwailam, Al-Mutawa (KUW)

26 September; 16:00	South Korea	30–24	Oman	Seonhak Handball Gymnasium, Incheon; Referees: Al-Marhoon, Al-Mawt (BHR)
26 September; 16:00	four players 4	(16–8)	Ham. Al-Dughaishi, Al-Tamtami 6	Seonhak Handball Gymnasium, Incheon; Referees: Al-Marhoon, Al-Mawt (BHR)
26 September; 16:00	3× (yellow card) 4× (suspension) 1× (red card)		3× (yellow card) 3× (suspension)	Seonhak Handball Gymnasium, Incheon; Referees: Al-Marhoon, Al-Mawt (BHR)

26 September; 18:00	Saudi Arabia	21–26	Iran	Seonhak Handball Gymnasium, Incheon; Referees: Al-Suwailam, Al-Mutawa (KUW)
26 September; 18:00	Al-Mohsin 4	(11–12)	Kazemi 6	Seonhak Handball Gymnasium, Incheon; Referees: Al-Suwailam, Al-Mutawa (KUW)
26 September; 18:00	1× (yellow card) 4× (suspension)		2× (yellow card) 2× (suspension) 1× (red card)	Seonhak Handball Gymnasium, Incheon; Referees: Al-Suwailam, Al-Mutawa (KUW)

=== Classification 5th–8th ===
==== Classification 7th–8th ====
29 September; 12:00	Chinese Taipei	21–27	Saudi Arabia	Seonhak Handball Gymnasium, Incheon; Referees: Lee, Koo (KOR)
29 September; 12:00	Chiu 6	(10–14)	Ma. Al-Salem 7	Seonhak Handball Gymnasium, Incheon; Referees: Lee, Koo (KOR)
29 September; 12:00	3× (yellow card) 3× (suspension)		3× (yellow card) 2× (suspension)	Seonhak Handball Gymnasium, Incheon; Referees: Lee, Koo (KOR)

==== Classification 5th–6th ====
29 September; 14:00	Kuwait	30–28	Oman	Seonhak Handball Gymnasium, Incheon; Referees: Kolahdouzan, Mousavian (IRI)
29 September; 14:00	Al-Dhuwaihi 10	(12–15)	A. Al-Hasani 7	Seonhak Handball Gymnasium, Incheon; Referees: Kolahdouzan, Mousavian (IRI)
29 September; 14:00	3× (yellow card)		3× (yellow card) 2× (suspension)	Seonhak Handball Gymnasium, Incheon; Referees: Kolahdouzan, Mousavian (IRI)

=== Final round ===
Semifinals
29 September
Qatar	29
Iran	21
29 September
South Korea	27
Bahrain	23

Gold medal match
2 October
Qatar	24
South Korea	21
Bronze medal match
2 October
Iran	25
Bahrain	28

==== Semifinals ====
29 September; 16:00	Qatar	29–21	Iran	Seonhak Handball Gymnasium, Incheon; Referees: Ikebuchi, Hizaki (JPN)
29 September; 16:00	Capote 6	(13–10)	Sekenari 6	Seonhak Handball Gymnasium, Incheon; Referees: Ikebuchi, Hizaki (JPN)
29 September; 16:00	4× (yellow card) 5× (suspension)		3× (yellow card) 4× (suspension)	Seonhak Handball Gymnasium, Incheon; Referees: Ikebuchi, Hizaki (JPN)

29 September; 18:00	South Korea	27–23	Bahrain	Seonhak Handball Gymnasium, Incheon; Referees: Al-Suwailam, Al-Mutawa (KUW)
29 September; 18:00	Eom 7	(12–10)	M. Abdulqader, Al-Maqabi 5	Seonhak Handball Gymnasium, Incheon; Referees: Al-Suwailam, Al-Mutawa (KUW)
29 September; 18:00	2× (yellow card)		3× (yellow card) 5× (suspension) 1× (red card)	Seonhak Handball Gymnasium, Incheon; Referees: Al-Suwailam, Al-Mutawa (KUW)

==== Bronze medal match ====
2 October; 16:00	Iran	25–28	Bahrain	Seonhak Handball Gymnasium, Incheon; Referees: Ikebuchi, Hizaki (JPN)
2 October; 16:00	Barbat 6	(13–12)	M. Abdulqader 10	Seonhak Handball Gymnasium, Incheon; Referees: Ikebuchi, Hizaki (JPN)
2 October; 16:00	4× (yellow card) 6× (suspension) 1× (red card)		4× (yellow card) 6× (suspension)	Seonhak Handball Gymnasium, Incheon; Referees: Ikebuchi, Hizaki (JPN)

==== Gold medal match ====
2 October; 18:00	Qatar	24–21	South Korea	Seonhak Handball Gymnasium, Incheon; Referees: Kolahdouzan, Mousavian (IRI)
2 October; 18:00	Roiné 6	(12–11)	Yu, Park J., Eom 4	Seonhak Handball Gymnasium, Incheon; Referees: Kolahdouzan, Mousavian (IRI)
2 October; 18:00	3× (yellow card) 2× (suspension)		4× (yellow card) 3× (suspension)	Seonhak Handball Gymnasium, Incheon; Referees: Kolahdouzan, Mousavian (IRI)

Teams were:

- GK: Hamdi Missaoui, Yousuf Al-Abdulla, Goran Stojanović
- Players: Ameen Zakkar, Hassan Mabrouk 2, Bertrand Roiné 6/1, Rafael Capote 2, Abdulla Al-Karbi, Abdulrazzaq Murad, Eldar Memišević 5, Borja Vidal, Youssef Benali 5, Hamad Madadi 1, Hadi Hamdoon, Mahmoud Hassaballa 3
- GK: Lee Dong-myung, Lee Chang-woo
- Players: Jeong Yi-kyeong, Sim Jae-bok 3, Park Kyung-suk, Yu Dong-geun 4, Jung Su-young 3, Park Jung-geu 4, Lee Sang-uk 1/1, Lim Duk-jun 1, Oh Yun-suk, Hwang Do-yeop, Yoon Ci-yoel, Lee Hyeon-sik, Lee Eun-ho 1, Eom Hyo-won 4/1

== Final standing ==
Rank	Team	Pld	W	D	L
1st place, gold medalist(s)	Qatar	8	8	0	0
2nd place, silver medalist(s)	South Korea	8	7	0	1
3rd place, bronze medalist(s)	Bahrain	7	5	0	2
4	Iran	7	3	0	4
5	Kuwait	6	3	0	3
6	Oman	7	3	0	4
7	Saudi Arabia	6	3	0	3
8	Chinese Taipei	7	2	0	5
9	Japan	6	4	0	2
10	China	6	3	0	3
11	Hong Kong	5	1	0	4
12	Mongolia	5	0	0	5
13	United Arab Emirates	4	1	0	3
14	India	4	0	0	4
