= Qatar at the 2014 Asian Games =

- IOC code: QAT
- NOC: Qatar Olympic Committee

in Incheon
- Medals Ranked 10th: Gold 10 Silver 0 Bronze 4 Total 14

Asian Games appearances (overview)
- 1978; 1982; 1986; 1990; 1994; 1998; 2002; 2006; 2010; 2014; 2018; 2022; 2026

Qatar participated in the 2014 Asian Games in Incheon, South Korea from 19 September to 4 October 2014.

== Medal summary ==
=== Medal table ===
Sport	Gold	Silver	Bronze	Total
Athletics	6	0	3	9
Equestrian	1	0	0	1
Handball	1	0	0	1
Shooting	2	0	1	3
Total	10	0	4	14

== Medalists ==
Medal	Name	Sport	Event
Gold	Femi Ogunode	Athletics	Men's 100 metres
Gold	Femi Ogunode	Athletics	Men's 200 metres
Gold	Mohamad Al-Garni	Athletics	Men's 1500 metres
Gold	Mohamad Al-Garni	Athletics	Men's 5000 metres
Gold	Abubaker Ali Kamal	Athletics	Men's 3000 metres steeplechase
Gold	Mutaz Essa Barshim	Athletics	Men's high jump
Gold	Nasser Al-Ghazali; Ali Al-Thani; Khalid Al-Emadi; Bassem Hassan Mohammed	Equestrian	Team Jumping
Gold	Hamdi Missaoui; Ameen Zakkar; Hassan Mabrouk; Bertrand Roiné; Rafael Capote; Abdulla Al-Karbi; Abdulrazzaq Murad; Yousuf Al-Abdulla; Eldar Memišević; Goran Stojanović; Borja Vidal; Kamalaldin Mallash; Youssef Benali; Hamad Madadi; Hadi Hamdoon; Mahmoud Hassaballa	Handball	Men
Gold	Masoud Hamad Al-Athba; Rashid Hamad Al-Athba; Hamad Al-Marri	Shooting	Men's double trap team
Bronze	Jamal Hairane	Athletics	Men's 800 metres
Bronze	Muammer Aissa Barshim	Athletics	Men's high jump
Bronze	Ahmed Mohamed Dheeb	Athletics	Men's discus throw
Bronze	Anisa Saleh Juma; Amal Mohammed; Saaida Humaid Taaeeb	Shooting	Women's 10 metre running target team
