= Hasan Al-Fardan =

Bahraini handball player

Hasan Shebab
Personal information
- Full name: Hasan Shebab Al-Fardan
- Nationality: Bahraini
- Born: 12 October 1988 (age 38)
- Height: 1.70 m (5 ft 7 in)

Sport
- Sport: Handball
- Position: Pivot
- Current club: Al-Ahli
- Number: 88
National team
| Years | Team | Apps | (Gls) |
| – | Bahrain | 79 | (302) |
Medal record
Asian Championship
| Silver medal – second place | 2018 South Korea |
| Bronze medal – third place | 2024 Bahrain |
Asian Games
| Silver medal – second place | 2018 Indonesia | Team |
| Bronze medal – third place | 2014 South Korea | Team |

Hasan Shebab Al-Fardan (Arabic: حسن شهاب الفردان, (born 12 October 1988)known as Hasan Al-Fardan or Hasan Shebab, is a Bahraini handball player for Al-Ahli and the Bahraini national team.

He participated at the 2017 World Men's Handball Championship.
