= Jasim Al-Salatna =

Bahraini handball player

Personal information
- Full name: Jasim Abbas Al-Salatna
- Nationality: Bahraini
- Born: 23 March 1989 (age 37)
- Height: 1.85 m (6 ft 1 in)

Sport
- Sport: Handball
- Position: Left back
- Current club: Al-Ahli
- Number: 77
National team
Years	Team	Apps	(Gls)
–	Bahrain	87	(255)
Medal record
Asian Championship
Silver medal – second place	2018 South Korea	Team
Asian Games
Silver medal – second place	2018 Indonesia	Team
Bronze medal – third place	2014 South Korea	Team

Jasim Abbas Al-Salatna (born 23 March 1989) is a Bahraini handball player for Al-Ahli and the Bahraini national team.

He participated at the 2017 World Men's Handball Championship.
