= Mohamed Merza =

Bahraini handball player

Personal information
- Full name: Mohamed Merza Salman Ali
- Nationality: Bahraini
- Born: 17 April 1987 (age 39)
- Height: 1.93 m (6 ft 4 in)

Sport
- Sport: Handball
- Position: Pivot
- Current club: Al-Najma
- Number: 19
National team
Years	Team	Apps	(Gls)
–	Bahrain	47	(133)
Medal record
Asian Championship
Silver medal – second place	2018 South Korea
Silver medal – second place	2022 Saudi Arabia
Bronze medal – third place	2024 Bahrain
Asian Games
Silver medal – second place	2018 Indonesia	Team
Bronze medal – third place	2014 South Korea	Team

Mohamed Merza Salman Ali (Arabic: محمد ميرزا سلمان علي, born 17 April 1987), known as Mohamed Merza or Mohamed Ali, is a Bahraini handball player for Al-Najma and the Bahraini national team.

He participated at the 2017 World Men's Handball Championship and at the delayed 2020 Summer Olympics.
