= Hasan Al-Samahiji =

Bahraini handball player

Personal information
- Full name: Hasan Mohamed Al-Samahiji
- Nationality: Bahraini
- Born: 22 February 1991 (age 35)
- Height: 1.77 m (5 ft 10 in)

Sport
- Sport: Handball
- Position: Left wing
- Current club: Al-Ahli
- Number: 9
National team
Years	Team	Apps	(Gls)
–	Bahrain	47	(165)
Medal record
Asian Championship
Silver medal – second place	2018 South Korea
Silver medal – second place	2022 Saudi Arabia
Bronze medal – third place	2024 Bahrain
Asian Games
Silver medal – second place	2018 Indonesia	Team
Bronze medal – third place	2014 South Korea	Team

Hasan Mohamed Al-Samahiji (Arabic: حسن السماهيجي, romanized: Hasan Al-Samahiji, born 22 February 1991), also known as Hasan Alsamahiji, is a Bahraini handball player for Al-Ahli and the Bahraini national team.

He participated at the 2017 World Men's Handball Championship and at the delayed 2020 Summer Olympics.
