= Ali Merza =

Bahraini handball player

Personal information
- Full name: Ali Merza Salman Abdulla Ali
- Nationality: Bahraini
- Born: 7 July 1988 (age 38)
- Height: 1.84 m (6 ft 0 in)

Sport
- Sport: Handball
- Position: Left back
- Current club: Al-Ahli
- Number: 77
National team
Years	Team	Apps	(Gls)
–	Bahrain	87	(374)
Medal record
Asian Championship
Silver medal – second place	2018 South Korea
Silver medal – second place	2022 Saudi Arabia
Bronze medal – third place	2024 Bahrain
Asian Games
Silver medal – second place	2018 Indonesia	Team
Bronze medal – third place	2014 South Korea	Team

Ali Merza Salman Abdulla Ali (Arabic: علي ميرزا سلمان علي, born 7 July 1988), known as Ali Merza or Ali Merza Salman or Ali Merza Ali, is a Bahraini handball player for Al-Ahli and the Bahraini national team.

He participated at the 2017 World Men's Handball Championship and at the delayed 2020 Summer Olympics.
