= Mohamed Al-Maqabi =

Bahraini handball player

Personal information
- Full name: Mohamed Jasim Al-Maqabi
- Nationality: Bahraini
- Born: 14 July 1988 (age 38)
- Height: 1.81 m (5 ft 11 1/2 in)

Sport
- Sport: Handball
- Position: Right back
- Current club: Barbar
- Number: 51
National team
Years	Team	Apps	(Gls)
–	Bahrain	75	(160)
Medal record
Asian Games
Bronze medal – third place	2014 South Korea	Team

Mohamed Jasim Al-Maqabi (born 14 July 1988) is a Bahraini handball player for Barbar and the Bahraini national team.

He participated at the 2017 World Men's Handball Championship.
