= Ahmed Jalal (handballer) =

Bahraini handball player

Personal information
- Full name: Ahmed Fadhul Jalal
- Nationality: Bahraini
- Born: 31 January 1998 (age 28)
- Height: 1.68 m (5 ft 6 in)

Sport
- Sport: Handball
- Position: Right wing
- Current club: Al-Shabab
- Number: 23
National team
| Years | Team | Apps | (Gls) |
| – | Bahrain | 32 | (74) |
Medal record
Men's handball
Representing Bahrain
Asian Games
| Gold medal – first place | 2026 Aichi–Nagoya | Team |
| Silver medal – second place | 2022 Hangzhou | Team |
Asian Championship
| Silver medal – second place | 2018 South Korea | Team |
| Silver medal – second place | 2022 Saudi Arabia | Team |
| Bronze medal – third place | 2024 Bahrain | Team |

Ahmed Fadhul Jalal (Arabic: أحمد فاضل جلال, born 31 January 1998), known as Ahmed Jalal or Ahmed Fadhul, is a Bahraini handball player for Al-Shabab and the Bahraini national team.

He represented Bahrain at the 2019 World Men's Handball Championship and at the delayed 2020 Summer Olympics.
