= Wajdi Sinen =

Qatari handball player (born 1990)

Personal information
- Nationality: Tunisian/Qatari
- Born: 17 September 1990 (age 36)
- Height: 1.93 m (6 ft 4 in)

Sport
- Sport: Handball
- Position: Left back
- Current club: Al Arabi
- Number: 24
National team
Years	Team	Apps	(Gls)
–	Qatar	71	(257)
Medal record
Asian Championship
Gold medal – first place	2020 Kuwait
Gold medal – first place	2022 Saudi Arabia
Gold medal – first place	2024 Bahrain

Wajdi Sinen (born 17 September 1990) is a Tunisian-born Qatari handball player for Al Arabi and the Qatari national team.

He participated at the 2017 World Men's Handball Championship.
