= Nidhal Aissa =

Qatari handball player (born 1991)

Personal information
- Nationality: Qatari
- Born: 8 June 1991 (age 35)
- Height: 1.82 m (6 ft 0 in)

Sport
- Sport: Handball
- Position: Right wing
- Current club: Al-Wakrah
National team
Years	Team	Apps	(Gls)
–	Qatar	18	(20)
Medal record
Asian Championship
Silver medal – second place	2026 Kuwait

Nidhal Aissa (born 8 June 1991) is a Qatari handball player for Al-Wakrah and the Qatari national team.

He represented Qatar at the 2019 World Men's Handball Championship.
