= Ali Abdulla Eid =

Bahraini handball player

Ali Eid
Personal information
- Full name: Ali Abdulla Eid
- Nationality: Bahraini
- Born: 18 January 1991 (age 35)
- Height: 1.77 m (5 ft 10 in)

Sport
- Sport: Handball
- Position: Pivot
- Current club: Al-Najma
- Number: 3
National team
Years	Team	Apps	(Gls)
–	Bahrain	45	(150)
Medal record
Asian Championship
Silver medal – second place	2018 South Korea
Silver medal – second place	2022 Saudi Arabia
Bronze medal – third place	2024 Bahrain
Asian Games
Bronze medal – third place	2014 South Korea	Team

Ali Abdulla Eid (Arabic: علي عبد الله عيد, born 18 January 1991) is a Bahraini handball player for Al-Najma and the Bahraini national team.

He participated at the 2017 World Men's Handball Championship and at the delayed 2020 Summer Olympics.
