= Mohamed Abdulhusain =

Bahraini handball player

Personal information
- Full name: Mohamed Husain Abdulhusain
- Nationality: Bahraini
- Born: 12 August 1989 (age 37)
- Height: 1.87 m (6 ft 2 in)

Sport
- Sport: Handball
- Position: Goalkeeper
- Current club: Al-Najma
- Number: 21
National team
Years	Team	Apps	(Gls)
–	Bahrain	92	(25)
Medal record
Asian Games
Silver medal – second place	2018 Indonesia	Team
Bronze medal – third place	2014 South Korea	Team
Asian Championship
Gold medal – first place	2026 Kuwait
Silver medal – second place	2022 Saudi Arabia
Silver medal – second place	2018 South Korea
Bronze medal – third place	2024 Bahrain

Mohamed Husain Abdulhusain (Arabic: محمد حسين عبد الحسين, born 12 August 1989), known as Mohamed Abdulhusain or Mohamed A. Husain or Mohamed Ali, is a Bahraini handball player for Al-Najma and the Bahraini national team.

He participated at the 2017 World Men's Handball Championship and at the delayed 2020 Summer Olympics.
