= Husain Al-Sayyad =

Bahraini handball player

Personal information
- Full name: Husain Ali Al-Sayyad
- Nationality: Bahraini
- Born: 14 January 1988 (age 38)
- Height: 1.78 m (5 ft 10 in)

Sport
- Sport: Handball
- Position: Centre back
- Current club: Al-Najma
- Number: 99
National team
Years	Team	Apps	(Gls)
–	Bahrain	97	(486)
Medal record
Men's handball
Representing Bahrain
Asian Games
Gold medal – first place	2026 Aichi–Nagoya	Team
Silver medal – second place	2018 Jakarta	Team
Silver medal – second place	2022 Hangzhou	Team
Bronze medal – third place	2014 Incheon	Team
Asian Championship
Gold medal – first place	2026 Kuwait
Silver medal – second place	2018 South Korea
Silver medal – second place	2022 Saudi Arabia
Bronze medal – third place	2024 Bahrain
Islamic Solidarity Games
Gold medal – first place	2025 Riyadh	Team

Husain Ali Al-Sayyad (Arabic: حسين علي الصياد, born 14 January 1988), also known as Husain Alsayyad, is a Bahraini handball player for captains both Al-Najma and the Bahraini national team.

He participated at the 2017 World Men's Handball Championship and at the delayed 2020 Summer Olympics. Along with Noor Yussuf Abdulla, he was flagbearer of Bahrain at the 2020 Summer Olympics.
