= Mahmood Abdulqader =

Bahraini handball player

Personal information
- Full name: Mahmood Abdulqader Ali
- Nationality: Bahraini
- Born: 4 October 1983 (age 43)
- Height: 1.76 m (5 ft 9 in)

Sport
- Sport: Handball
- Position: Left wing
- Current club: Barbar
- Number: 14
National team
Years	Team	Apps	(Gls)
–	Bahrain	65	(450)
Medal record
Asian Championship
Silver medal – second place	2018 South Korea
Silver medal – second place	2022 Saudi Arabia
Asian Games
Silver medal – second place	2018 Indonesia	Team
Bronze medal – third place	2014 South Korea	Team

Mahmood Abdulqader Ali (born 4 October 1983), also known as Mahmood Salman, is a Bahraini handball player for Barbar and the Bahraini national team. He participated at the 2017 World Men's Handball Championship. He was part of the national team that won the bronze medal at the 2014 Asian Games and the silver medal in 2018.
