= Omid Sekenari =

Iranian handball player (born 1988)

Personal information
- Nationality: Iranian
- Born: 24 April 1988 (age 38)
- Height: 1.83 m (6 ft 0 in)

Sport
- Sport: Handball
- Position: Right wing
- Current club: Magnesium Ferdows
National team
Years	Team	Apps	(Gls)
–	Iran	63	(226)

Omid Sekenari (Persian: امید سکناری, born 24 April 1988) is an Iranian handball player for Magnesium Ferdows and the Iranian national team.
