= Rafael Capote =

Cuban handball player (born 1987)

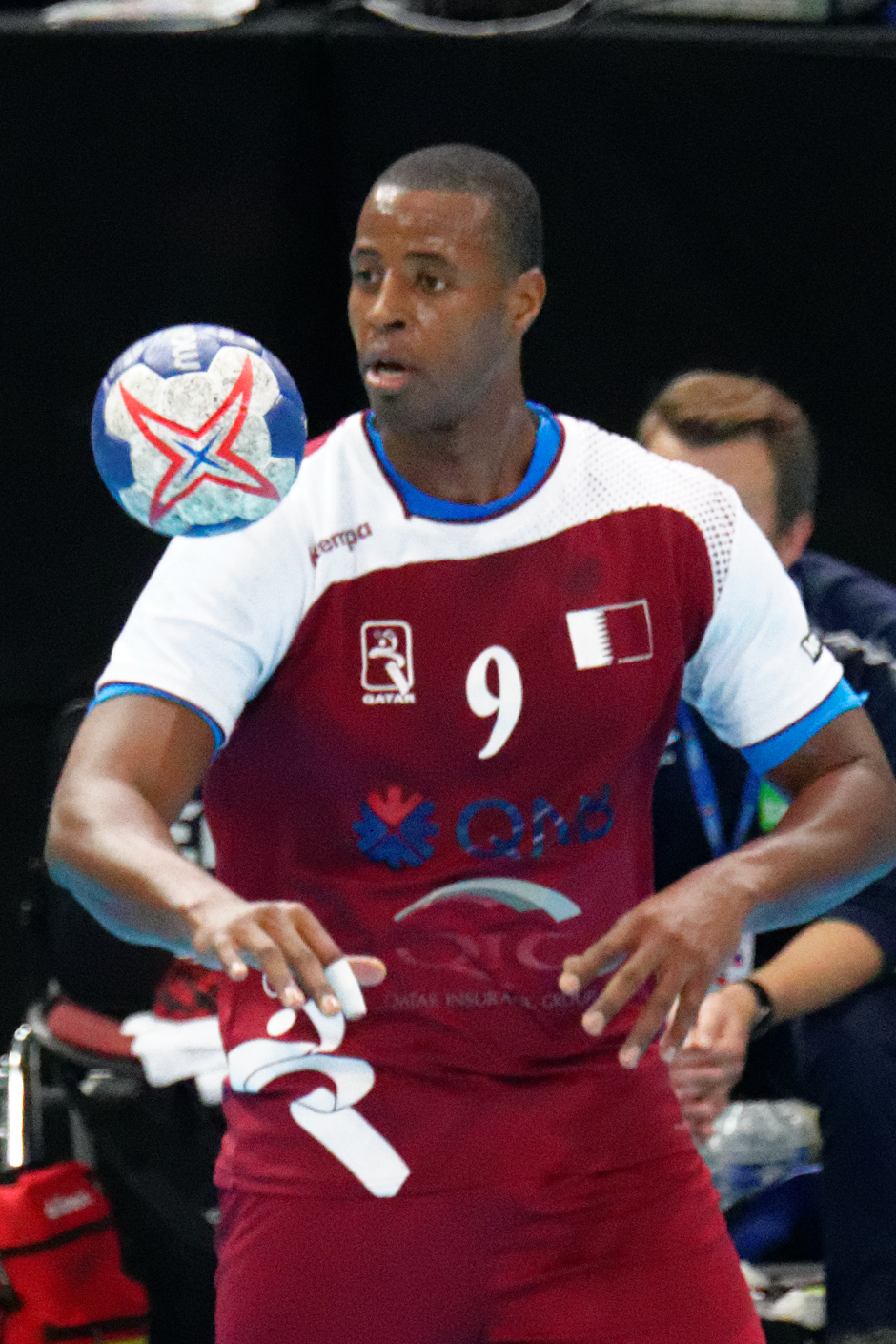
- Capote in 2016

Personal information
- Full name: Rafael da Costa Capote
- Nationality: Cuban/Qatari
- Born: 5 October 1987 (age 39) Havana, Cuba
- Height: 2.00 m (6 ft 7 in)

Sport
- Sport: Handball
- Position: Left back
- Current club: Al-Duhail
- Number: 9

Senior clubs
- Years: Team
- 2007–2009: Pallamano Conversano
- 2009–2011: BM Ciudad Encantada
- 2011–2013: CB Ciudad de Logroño
- 2013–2018: El Jaish
- 2018–: Al-Duhail
National team
Years	Team	Apps	(Gls)
2014-	Qatar	67	(269)
Medal record
Men's handball
Representing Qatar
World Championship
Silver medal – second place	2015 Qatar
Asian Games
Gold medal – first place	2014 Incheon	Team
Gold medal – first place	2018 Jakarta	Team
Gold medal – first place	2022 Hangzhou	Team
Silver medal – second place	2026 Aichi–Nagoya	Team
Asian Championship
Gold medal – first place	2014 Bahrain
Gold medal – first place	2016 Bahrain
Gold medal – first place	2018 South Korea
Gold medal – first place	2020 Kuwait
Gold medal – first place	2022 Saudi Arabia
Gold medal – first place	2024 Bahrain
Silver medal – second place	2026 Kuwait
Representing Cuba
Pan American Games
Gold medal – first place	2007 Rio de Janeiro	Team

Rafael Da Costa Capote (born 5 October 1987) is a Cuban-born Qatari handball player for Al-Duhail and the Qatari national team.

He was part of the Qatar team that won silver medals at the 2015 World Championship in Qatar, the first World Championship medal for both Qatar and for any Asian team. The result was however controversial due to the many naturalized players of Qatar, of which Capote was one of them. According to the Frankfurter Allgemeine, only four of the 17 players in the squad were native to Qatar. The practice was criticised by Austrian goalkeeper after his team's loss to Qatar in the round of 16, saying "It [felt] like playing against a world selection team" and "I think it is not the sense of a world championship." Furthermore there were claims of favourable refereering for the hosts. After the final whistle of their semifinal against Poland, the Polish players showed their discontent by ironically applauding the three referees.
