= Abdulrazzaq Murad =

Qatari handball player (born 1990)

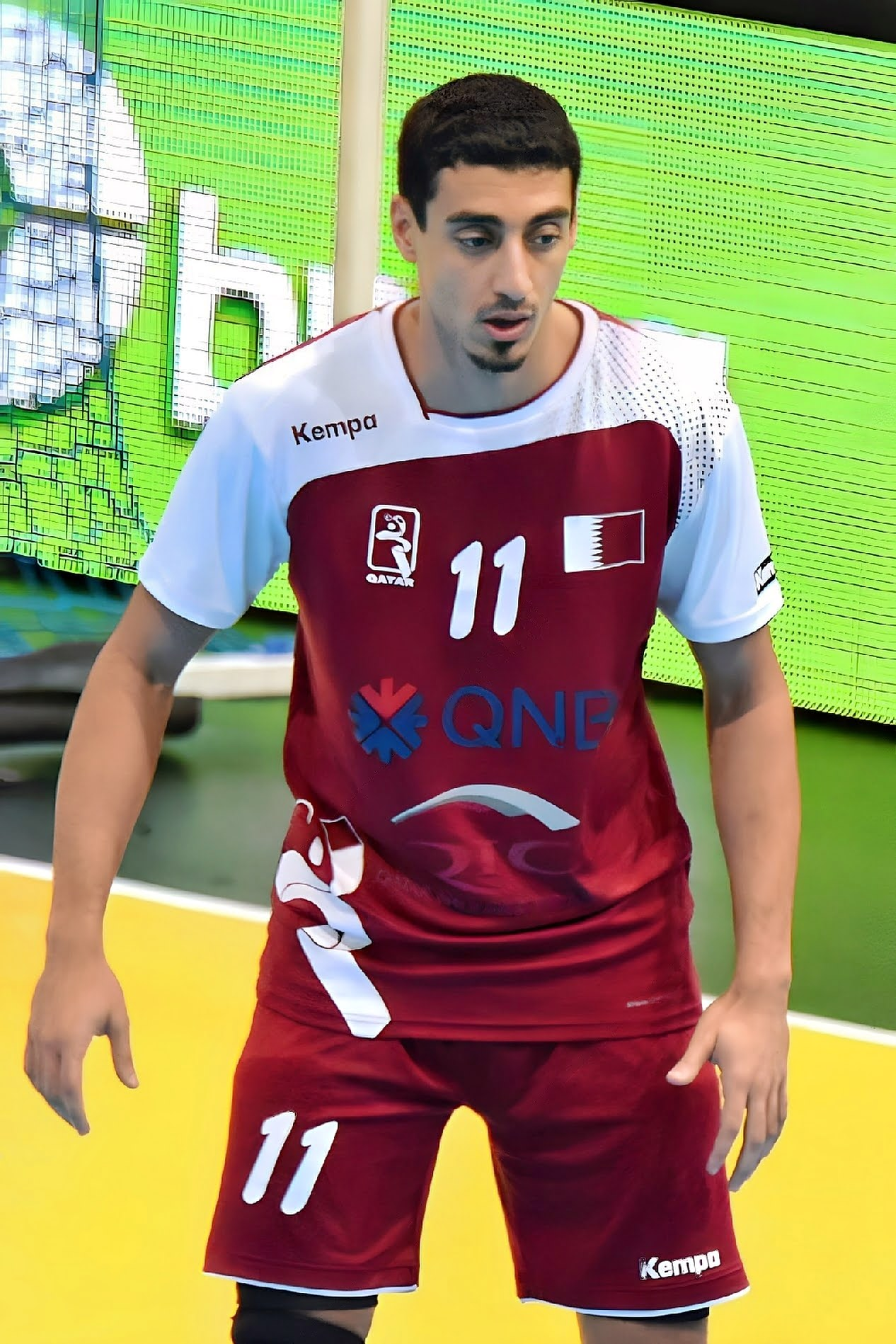

Personal information
- Nationality: Qatari
- Born: 29 June 1990 (age 36)
- Height: 1.86 m (6 ft 1 in)

Sport
- Sport: Handball
- Position: Left wing
- Current club: Al-Gharafa
National team
Years	Team	Apps
–	Qatar	78
Medal record
Representing Qatar
Men's handball
World Championship
Silver medal – second place	2015 Qatar
Asian Games
Gold medal – first place	2014 Incheon	Team
Gold medal – first place	2018 Jakarta	Team
Gold medal – first place	2022 Hangzhou	Team
Silver medal – second place	2026 Aichi–Nagoya	Team
Asian Championship
Gold medal – first place	2018 South Korea
Gold medal – first place	2024 Bahrain
Silver medal – second place	2026 Kuwait
Islamic Solidarity Games
Silver medal – second place	2025 Riyadh	Team
Men's beach handball
World Games
Silver medal – second place	2022 Birmingham	Team

Abdulrazzaq Murad (born 29 June 1990) is a Qatari handball player for Al-Gharafa and the Qatari national team. He was part of the Qatar team that won silver medals at the 2015 World Championship in Qatar, the first World Championship medal for both Qatar and for any Asian team.
