= Hadi Hamdoon =

Qatari handball player (born 1992)

Personal information
- Nationality: Qatari
- Born: 5 February 1992 (age 34)
- Height: 1.83 m (6 ft 0 in)

Sport
- Sport: Handball
- Position: Pivot
- Current club: Al Rayyan
- Number: 72

Senior clubs
- Years: Team
- 2010–2017: El Jaish
- 2022–; present: Al-Rayan
National team
Years	Team	Apps	(Gls)
–	Qatar	55	(167)
Medal record
Representing Qatar
Men's handball
World Championship
Silver medal – second place	2015 Qatar	Team

Hadi Hamdoon (born 5 February 1992) is a Qatari handball player for Al Rayyan and the Qatari national team.

He was part of the Qatar team that won silver medals at the 2015 World Championship in Qatar, the first World Championship medal for both Qatar and for any Asian team. The result was however controversial due to the many naturalized players of Qatar. According to the Frankfurter Allgemeine, only four of the 17 players in the squad were native to Qatar. The practice was criticised by Austrian goalkeeper after his team's loss to Qatar in the round of 16, saying "It [felt] like playing against a world selection team" and "I think it is not the sense of a world championship." Furthermore there were claims of favourable refereering for the hosts. After the final whistle of their semifinal against Poland, the Polish players showed their discontent by ironically applauding the three referees.
