= Hussain Al-Hannabi =

Saudi Arabian handball player

Personal information
- Nationality: Saudi Arabian
- Born: 26 August 1988 (age 38)
- Height: 1.80 m (5 ft 11 in)

Sport
- Sport: Handball
- Position: Left back
- Current club: Al-Safa
National team
Years	Team	Apps	(Gls)
–	Saudi Arabia	90	(100)

Hussain Al-Hannabi (Arabic: حسين الهنابي; born 26 August 1988) is a Saudi Arabian handball player for Al-Safa and the Saudi Arabian national team.
