= Yu Dong-geun =

South Korean handball player (born 1985)

Personal information
- Born: September 3, 1985 (age 39)

Sport
- Sport: Team handball

Korean name
- Hangul: 유동근
- RR: Yu Donggeun
- MR: Yu Tonggŭn

Yu Dong-geun (born 3 September 1985) is a South Korean handball player. At the 2012 Summer Olympics he competed with the South Korea men's national handball team in the men's tournament.
