= Eldar Memišević =

Qatari handball player (born 1992)

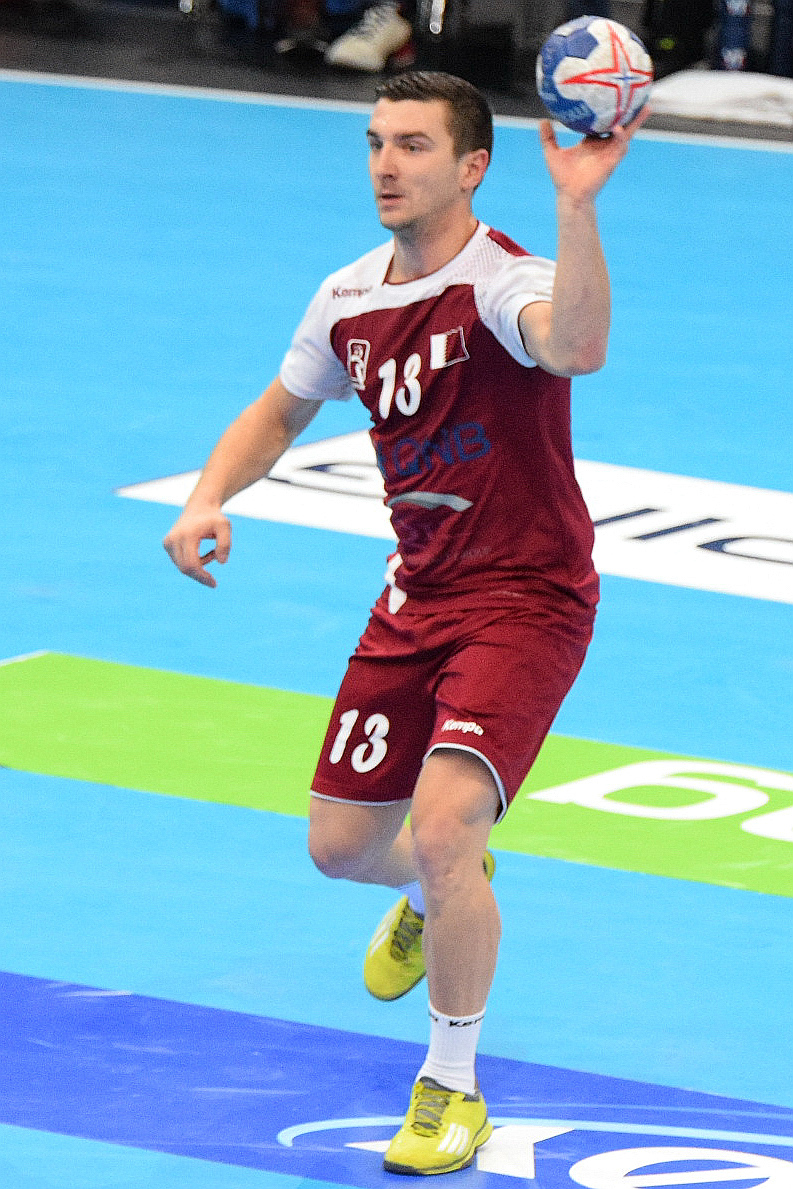

Personal information
- Nationality: Bosnian / Qatari
- Born: 21 June 1992 (age 34) Sarajevo, Republic of Bosnia and Herzegovina
- Height: 1.78 m (5 ft 10 in)

Sport
- Sport: Handball
- Position: Right wing
- Number: 13
National team
Years	Team	Apps	(Gls)
–	Qatar	100	(196)
Medal record
Men's handball
Representing Qatar
World Championship
Silver medal – second place	2015 Qatar
Asian Games
Gold medal – first place	2014 Incheon	Team
Gold medal – first place	2022 Hangzhou	Team
Silver medal – second place	2026 Aichi–Nagoya	Team
Asian Championship
Gold medal – first place	2022 Saudi Arabia
Gold medal – first place	2024 Bahrain
Silver medal – second place	2026 Kuwait
Islamic Solidarity Games
Silver medal – second place	2025 Riyadh	Team

Eldar Memišević (born 21 June 1992) is a Bosnian-born Qatari handball player for Al Rayyan and the Qatari national team.

He was part of the Qatar team that won silver medals at the 2015 World Championship in Qatar, the first World Championship medal for both Qatar and for any Asian team. The result was however controversial due to the many naturalized players of Qatar, of which Memišević was one of them. According to the Frankfurter Allgemeine, only four of the 17 players in the squad were native to Qatar. The practice was criticised by Austrian goalkeeper after his team's loss to Qatar in the round of 16, saying "It [felt] like playing against a world selection team" and "I think it is not the sense of a world championship." Furthermore, there were claims of favourable refereering for the hosts. After the final whistle of their semifinal against Poland, the Polish players showed their discontent by ironically applauding the three referees.
