= Hiroki Shida =

Japanese handball player (born 1989)

Personal information
- Nationality: Japanese
- Born: 24 June 1989 (age 37)
- Height: 1.89 m (6 ft 2 in)

Sport
- Sport: Handball
- Position: Left back
- Current club: Osaki Osol
National team
Years	Team	Apps	(Gls)
–	Japan	77	(219)

Hiroki Shida (信太 弘樹, Shida Hiroki; born 24 June 1989) is a Japanese handball player for Osaki Osol and the Japanese national team.

He participated at the 2017 World Men's Handball Championship.
