= Hisham Al-Obaidi =

Saudi Arabian handball player

Personal information
- Nationality: Saudi Arabian
- Born: 20 March 1988 (age 38)
- Height: 1.82 m (6 ft 0 in)

Sport
- Sport: Handball
- Position: Centre back
- Current club: Al-Wehda Club
- Number: 24
National team
Years	Team	Apps	(Gls)
–	Saudi Arabia	117	(317)
Medal record
Asian Championship
Bronze medal – third place	2022 Saudi Arabia

Hisham Al-Obaidi (Arabic: هشام العبيدي; born 20 March 1988) is a Saudi Arabian handball player for Al-Wehda Club and the Saudi Arabian national team.
