= Lim Duk-jun =

South Korean handball player (born 1980)

- Hangul: 임덕준
- RR: Im Deokjun
- MR: Im Tŏkchun

Lim Duk-jun (born 30 August 1980) is a Korean handball player who competed in the 2004 Summer Olympics and the 2012 Summer Olympics.
