= Yousuf Al-Abdulla =

Qatari handball player (born 1985)

Personal information
- Nationality: Qatari
- Born: 26 February 1985 (age 41)
- Height: 1.78 m (5 ft 10 in)

Sport
- Sport: Handball
- Position: Goalkeeper
- Current club: Al-Gharafa
National team
Years	Team	Apps	(Gls)
–	Qatar	33	(0)

Yousuf Al-Abdulla (born 26 February 1985) is a Qatari handball player for Al-Gharafa and the Qatari national team.

He participated at the 2017 World Men's Handball Championship.
