= Mahmoud Hassaballa =

Egyptian-Qatari handball player (born 1986)

Personal information
- Nationality: Qatari
- Born: 22 November 1986 (age 39)
- Height: 1.82 m (6 ft 0 in)

Sport
- Sport: Handball
- Position: Left wing
- Current club: Al-Gharafa
- Number: 86
National team
Years	Team		
–	Egypt		
–	Qatar	52	(90)
Medal record
Men's handball
Representing Qatar
World Championship
Silver medal – second place	2015 Qatar
Asian Championship
Gold medal – first place	2018 South Korea

Mahmoud Hassaballa (Arabic: محمود حسب الله, born 22 November 1986) is an Egyptian-Qatari handball player for Al-Gharafa and the Qatari national team.

He competed in the men's tournament at the 2008 Summer Olympics representing Egypt. He was part of the Qatar team that won silver medals at the 2015 World Championship in Qatar, the first World Championship medal for both Qatar and for any Asian team. The result was however controversial due to the many naturalized players of Qatar, of which Hassaballa was one of them. According to the Frankfurter Allgemeine, only four of the 17 players in the squad were native to Qatar. The practice was criticised by Austrian goalkeeper after his team's loss to Qatar in the round of 16, saying "It [felt] like playing against a world selection team" and "I think it is not the sense of a world championship." Furthermore, there were claims of favourable refereering for the hosts. After the final whistle of their semifinal against Poland, the Polish players showed their discontent by ironically applauding the three referees.
