= Pouya Norouzinejad =

Iranian handball player (born 1994)

Personal information
- Full name: Pouya Norouzinejad Gharehlou
- Nationality: Iranian
- Born: 23 June 1994 (age 32) Ardabil, Iran
- Height: 1.89 m (6 ft 2 in)

Sport
- Sport: Handball
- Position: Centre back
- Current club: VfL Eintracht Hagen
- Number: 77

Senior clubs
- Years: Team
- –2017: Magnesium Ferdows
- 2017: Bergischer HC
- 2017–2018: Kadetten Schaffhausen
- 2018–2019: VfL Gummersbach
- 2019–2020: IK Sävehof
- 2020: Frisch Auf Göppingen
- 2020–2021: HSC 2000 Coburg
- 2021–: VfL Eintracht Hagen
National team
Years	Team	Apps	(Gls)
–	Iran	27	(70)
- Updated on 3 September 2021

Pouya Norouzinejad Gharehlou (Persian: پویا نوروزی‌نژاد, born 23 June 1994) is an Iranian handball player who plays for VfL Eintracht Hagen and the Iranian national team.
