= Jeong Yi-kyeong =

South Korean handball player (born 1985)

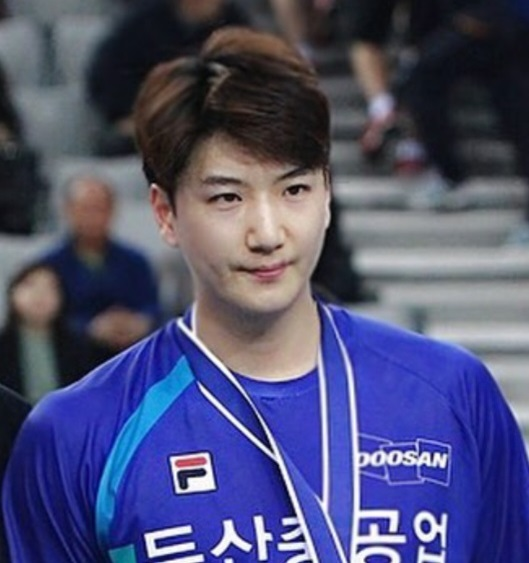

Personal information
- Nationality: South Korean
- Born: 28 February 1985 (age 41)

Sport
- Sport: Handball
National team
- Years: Team
- –: South Korea
Medal record
Asian Championship
Bronze medal – third place	2018 South Korea

- Jeong Yi-kyeong
- Hangul: 정의경
- RR: Jeong Uigyeong
- MR: Chŏng Ŭigyŏng

Jeong Yi-kyeong (Korean: 정의경; born 28 February 1985) is a Korean handball player who has competed in the 2008 and 2012 Summer Olympics.
