= Abdulla Al-Karbi =

Qatari handball player (born 1990)

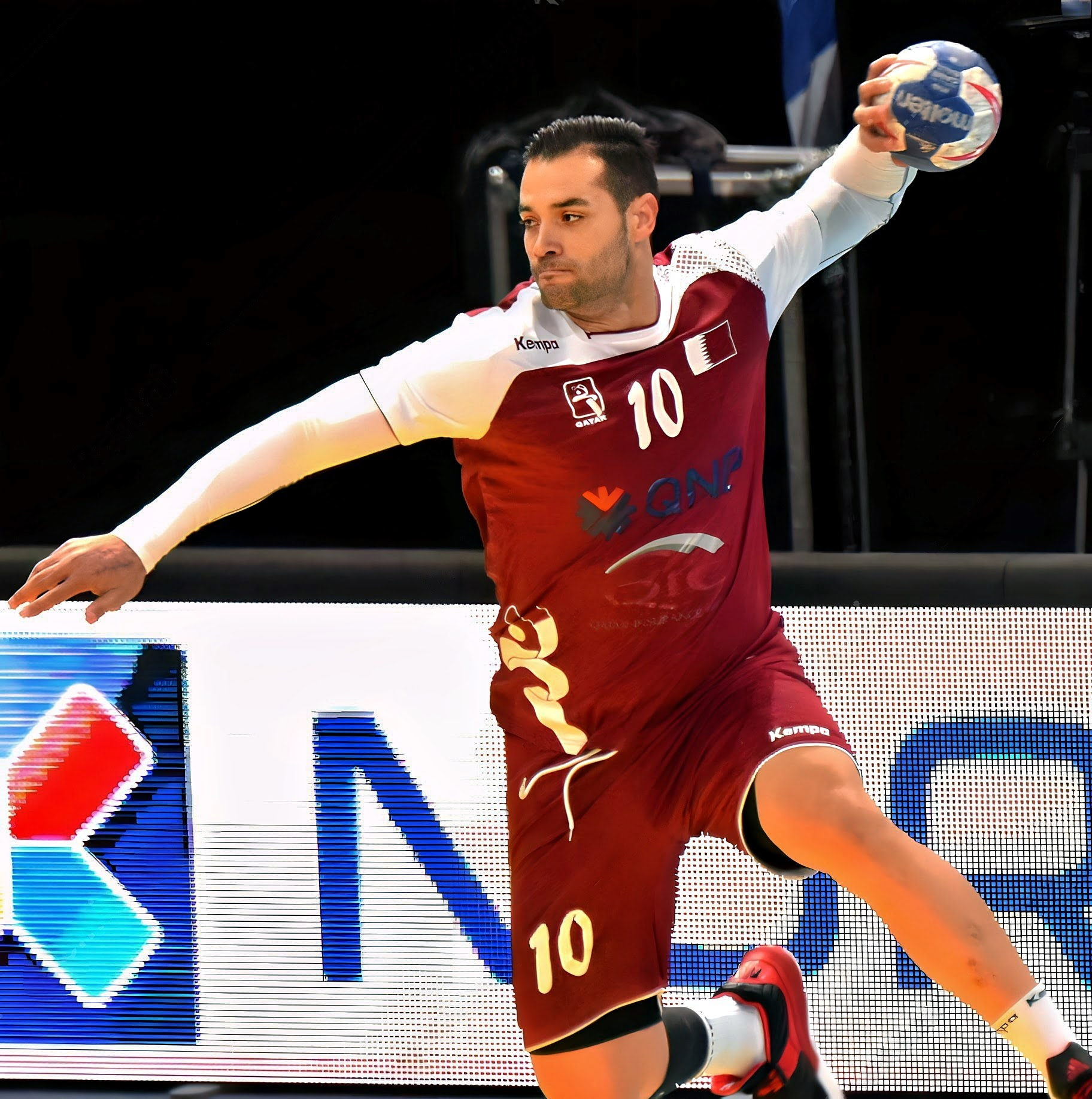

Personal information
- Nationality: Emirati/Qatari
- Born: 10 June 1990 (age 36)
- Height: 1.77 m (5 ft 10 in)

Sport
- Sport: Handball
- Position: Right wing
- Current club: Al Sadd
- Number: 10
National team
Years	Team	Apps	(Gls)
–	Qatar	42	(112)
Medal record
World Championship
Silver medal – second place	2015 Qatar

Abdulla Al-Karbi (born 10 June 1990) is an Emirati-born Qatari handball player for Al Sadd and the Qatari national team.

He was part of the Qatar team that won silver medals at the 2015 World Championship in Qatar, the first World Championship medal for both Qatar and for any Asian team. The result was however controversial due to the many naturalized players of Qatar. According to the Frankfurter Allgemeine, only four of the 17 players in the squad were native to Qatar. The practice was criticised by Austrian goalkeeper after his team's loss to Qatar in the round of 16, saying "It [felt] like playing against a world selection team" and "I think it is not the sense of a world championship." Furthermore there were claims of favourable refereering for the hosts. After the final whistle of their semifinal against Poland, the Polish players showed their discontent by ironically applauding the three referees.
