= Ameen Zakkar =

Qatari handball player (born 1994)

Personal information
- Nationality: Syrian/Qatari
- Born: 15 June 1994 (age 32) Hama, Syria
- Height: 1.98 m (6 ft 6 in)

Sport
- Sport: Handball
- Position: Left Back
- Current club: Khaleej Club
- Number: 94
National team
| Years | Team | Apps | (Gls) |
| – | Qatar | 35 | (62) |
Medal record
Men's handball
Representing Qatar
World Championship
| Silver medal – second place | 2015 Qatar |
Asian Games
| Gold medal – first place | 2014 Incheon | Team |
| Gold medal – first place | 2018 Jakarta | Team |
| Gold medal – first place | 2022 Hangzhou | Team |
| Silver medal – second place | 2026 Aichi–Nagoya | Team |
Asian Championship
| Gold medal – first place | 2020 Kuwait |
| Gold medal – first place | 2022 Saudi Arabia |
| Gold medal – first place | 2024 Bahrain |
| Silver medal – second place | 2026 Kuwait |
Islamic Solidarity Games
| Gold medal – first place | 2021 Konya | Team |

Ameen Zakkar (born 15 June 1994) is a Syrian-born Qatari player for Saudi Arabian handball player for Khaleej Club and the Qatari national team.

He was part of the Qatar team that won silver medals at the 2015 World Championship in Qatar, the first World Championship medal for both Qatar and for any Asian team. The result was however controversial due to the many naturalized players of Qatar. According to the Frankfurter Allgemeine, only four of the 17 players in the squad were native to Qatar. The practice was criticised by Austrian goalkeeper after his team's loss to Qatar in the round of 16, saying "It [felt] like playing against a world selection team" and "I think it is not the sense of a world championship." Furthermore there were claims of favourable refereering for the hosts. After the final whistle of their semifinal against Poland, the Polish players showed their discontent by ironically applauding the three referees. He also competed for Qatar at the 2016 Summer Olympics.
