= Amin Kazemi =

Iranian handball player (born 1988)

Personal information
- Nationality: Iranian
- Born: 7 May 1988 (age 38)
- Height: 1.86 m (6 ft 1 in)

Sport
- Sport: Handball
- Position: Left wing
- Current club: Bafgh Yazd
National team
Years	Team	Apps	(Gls)
–	Iran	57	(195)

Amin Kazemi (Persian: امین کاظمی, born 7 May 1988) is an Iranian handball player for Bafgh Yazd and the Iranian national team.
