= Eom Hyo-won =

South Korean handball player (born 1986)

Personal information
- Nationality: South Korean
- Born: 12 December 1986 (age 39)

Sport
- Sport: Handball
National team
- Years: Team
- –: South Korea
Medal record
Asian Championship
Bronze medal – third place	2018 South Korea

- Eom Hyo-won
- Hangul: 엄효원
- RR: Eom Hyowon
- MR: Ŏm Hyowŏn

Eom Hyo-won (born 12 December 1986) is a South Korean handball player. He was born in Seoul. He competed for the South Korean national team at the 2012 Summer Olympics in London.
