= Borja Vidal =

Spanish-Qatari handball and basketball player (born 1981)

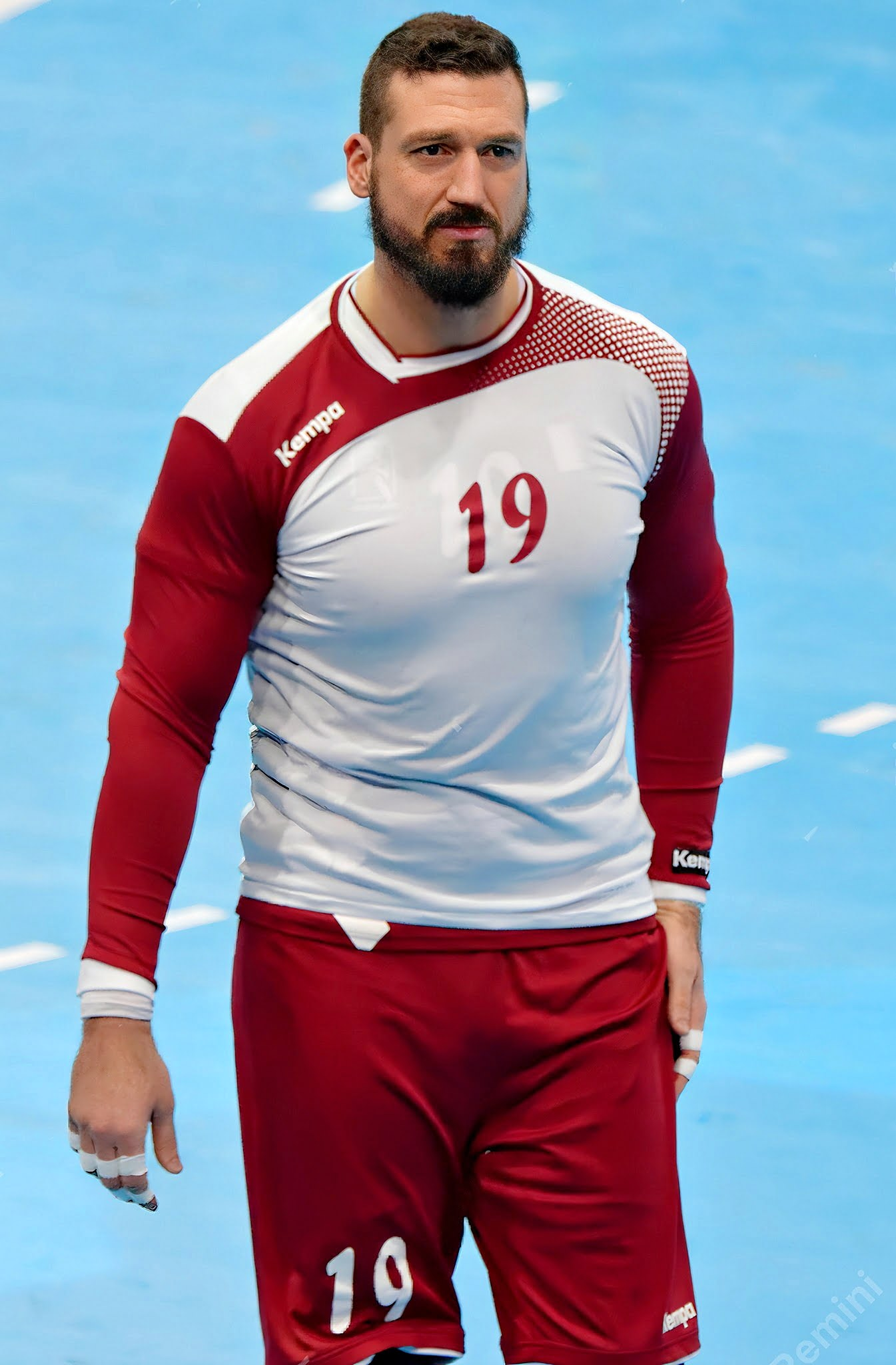
- Vidal in 2016

Personal information
- Full name: Borja Vidal Fernández Fernández
- Nationality: Spanish/Qatari
- Born: 25 December 1981 (age 44) Valdés, Spain
- Height: 2.06 m (6 ft 9 in)

Sport
- Sport: Handball
- Position: Pivot
- Current club: Al-Qiyada

Senior clubs
- Years: Team
- –: BM Aragón
- –: Algeciras BM
- –: SD Teucro
- –: CB Torrevieja
- 2011–2013: HBC Nantes
- 2013–: Al-Qiyada
National team
Years	Team	Apps	(Gls)
–	Qatar	34	(79)
Medal record
World Championship
Silver medal – second place	2015 Qatar

Borja Vidal Fernández Fernández (born 25 December 1981) is a Spanish-Qatari handball player for Al-Qiyada and the Qatari national team.

He formerly played professionally basketball in Spain until 2005, when he changed to handball.

In 2013, Fernández got the Qatari passport for playing with their national team. He was part of the Qatar team that won silver medals at the 2015 World Championship in Qatar, the first World Championship medal for both Qatar and for any Asian team. The result was however controversial due to the many naturalized players of Qatar, of which Fernández was one of them. According to the Frankfurter Allgemeine, only four of the 17 players in the squad were native to Qatar. The practice was criticised by Austrian goalkeeper after his team's loss to Qatar in the round of 16, saying "It [felt] like playing against a world selection team" and "I think it is not the sense of a world championship." Furthermore there were claims of favourable refereering for the hosts. After the final whistle of their semifinal against Poland, the Polish players showed their discontent by ironically applauding the three referees.

He competed in handball at the 2016 Summer Olympics.

== Club career as basketball player ==
- 1999–2001 Joventut Badalona (Spain 4th and Spain 1st)
- 2001–2002 Club Melilla Baloncesto (Spain 2nd)
- 2002–2003 Bilbao Basket (Spain 2nd)
- 2003–2004 Basket Napoli (Italy 1st)
- 2004–2005 CAI Zaragoza (Spain 2nd)

== Gallery ==
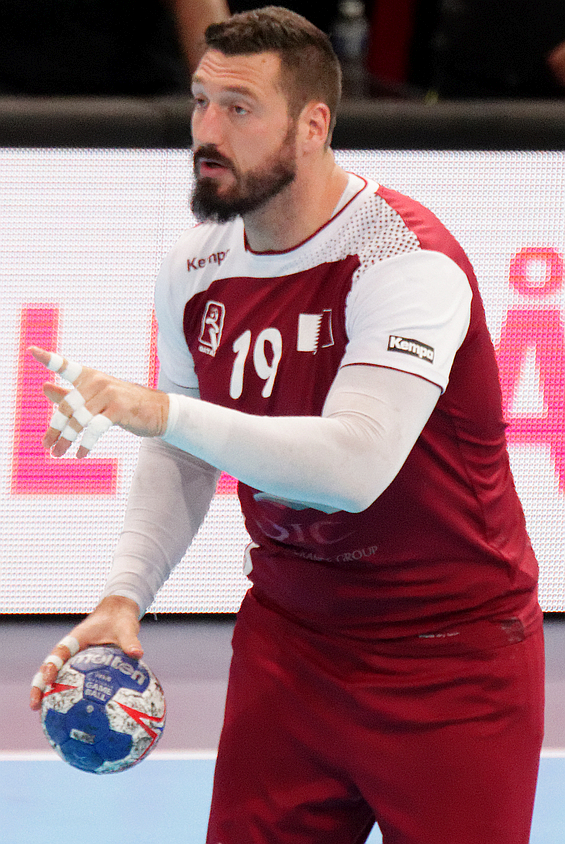

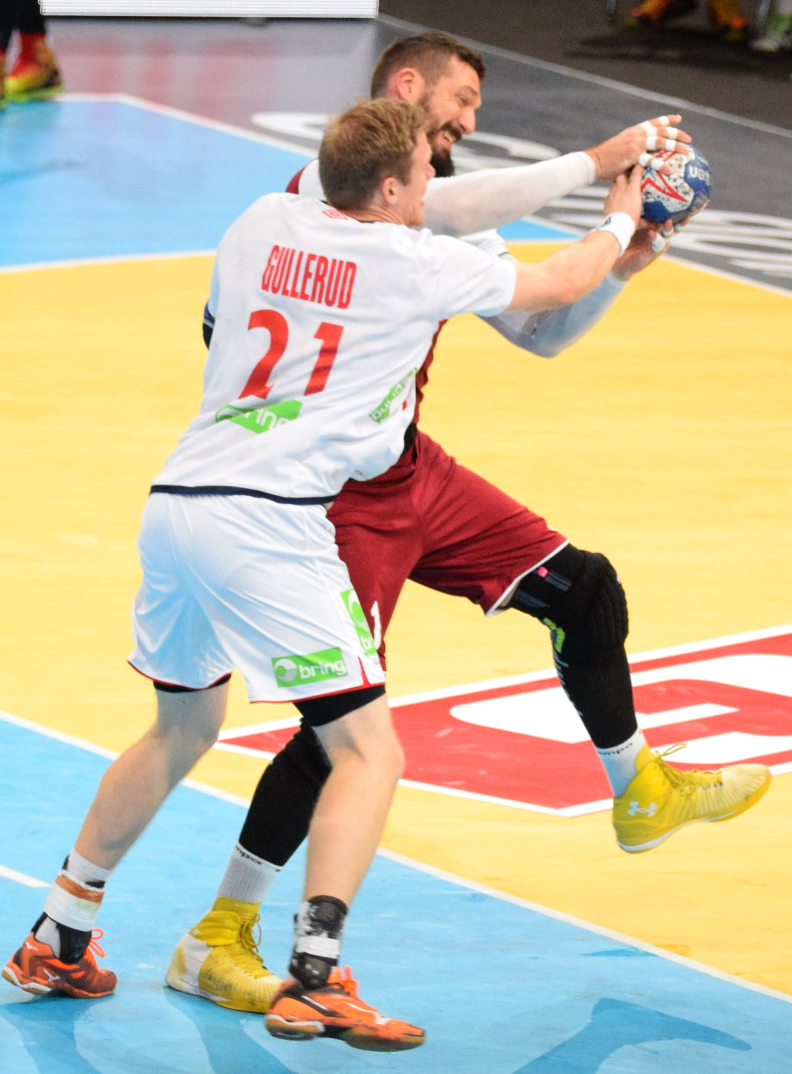

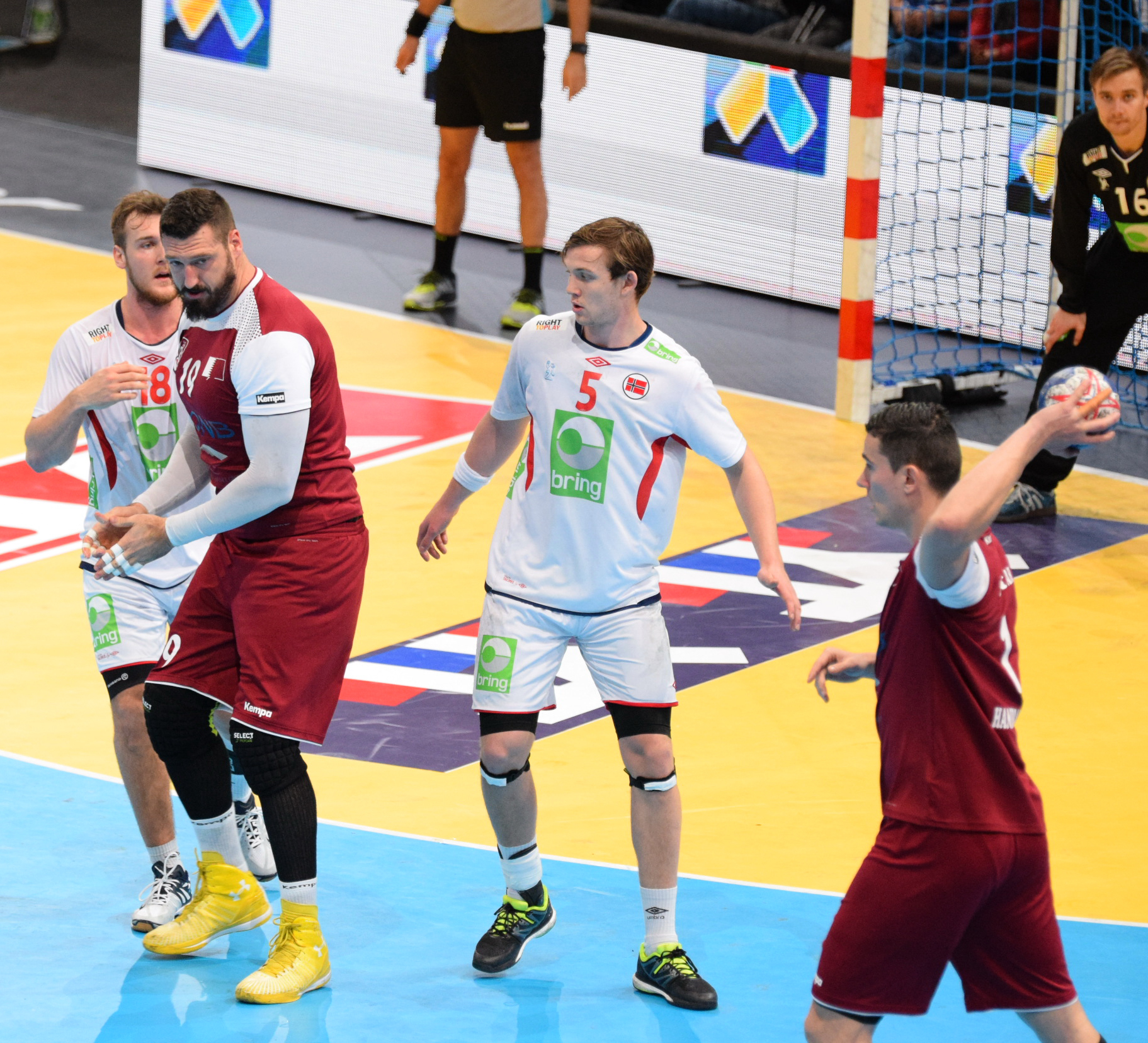

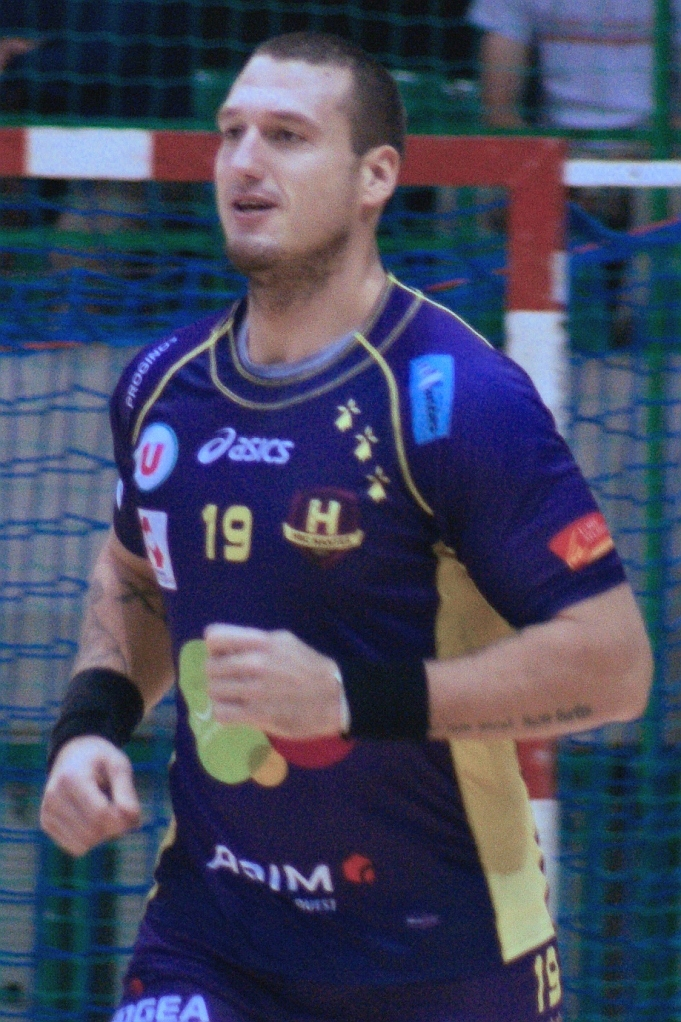
