= Hamad Madadi =

Qatari handball player (born 1988)

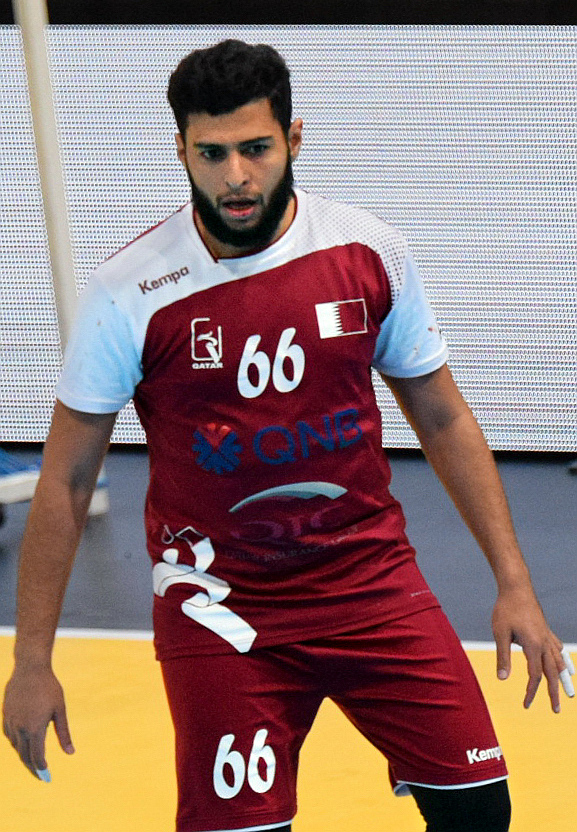
- January 10, 2016

Personal information
- Nationality: Qatari
- Born: 7 July 1988 (age 38)
- Height: 1.78 m (5 ft 10 in)

Sport
- Sport: Handball
- Position: Left wing
- Current club: Al-Duhail
- Number: 30
National team
| Years | Team | Apps | (Gls) |
| – | Qatar | 38 | (200) |
Medal record
Representing Qatar
Men's handball
World Championship
| Silver medal – second place | 2015 Qatar |
Asian Championship
| Gold medal – first place | 2022 Saudi Arabia |

Hamad Madadi (born 7 July 1988) is an Iranian-born Qatari handball player for Al-Duhail and the Qatari national team.
