= 2018 Asian Men's Handball Championship =

Asian Men's Handball Championship

2018 Asian Championship

Tournament details
- Host country: South Korea
- Venues: 2 (in 1 host city)
- Dates: 18–28 January
- Teams: 14 (from 1 confederation)

Final positions
- Champions: Qatar (3rd title)
- Runners-up: Bahrain
- Third place: South Korea
- Fourth place: Saudi Arabia

Tournament statistics
- Matches played: 45
- Goals scored: 2,428 (53.96 per match)

The 2018 Asian Men's Handball Championship was the 18th edition of the championship held under the aegis of Asian Handball Federation. The championship was hosted at Suwon, South Korea from 18 to 28 January 2018. It acted as the Asian qualifying tournament for the 2019 World Men's Handball Championship. For the first time, Australia, New Zealand and Bangladesh participated.

Qatar won their third title after defeating Bahrain 33–31 in the final.

== Venues ==
2018 Asian Men's Handball Championship is located in South Korea
2018 Asian Men's Handball Championship is located in South Korea	Suwon Gymnasium; Capacity: 5,145	Seo-Suwon Chilbo Gymnasium; Capacity: 4,411

== Draw ==
The draw took place on 13 September 2017 at 11:00.

Iraq withdrew on 4 January 2018 due to unavoidable circumstances. Iraq's withdrawal left only two teams in Group A, therefore Uzbekistan was moved from Group B to Group A to balance the number of teams in each group.

== Referees ==
The following ten referee pairs were selected.

Referees
Bahrain	Hussain Al-Mawt; Samir Marhoon
China	Cheng Yufeng; Zhou Yunlei
Germany	Robert Schulze; Tobias Tönnies
Iran	Alireza Mousavian; Majid Kolahduzan
Iraq	Fadhil Imran; Khalid Hussein

Referees
Japan	Kiyoshi Hizaki; Tomokazu Ikebuchi
Jordan	Akram Al-Zayat; Yasser Awad
Montenegro	Ivan Pavićević; Miloš Ražnatović
South Korea	Koo Bo-nok; Lee Se-ok
South Korea	Lee Gae-ul; Lee Eun-ha

== Preliminary round ==
All times are local (UTC+9).

=== Group A ===
Pos	Team	Pld	W	D	L	GF	GA	GD	Pts	Qualification
1	Iran	2	2	0	0	74	50	+24	4	Main round
2	Japan	2	1	0	1	70	64	+6	2	Main round
3	Uzbekistan	2	0	0	2	45	75	−30	0	

Source: AHF
Rules for classification: 1) points; 2) head-to-head points; 3) head-to-head goal difference; 4) head-to-head number of goals scored; 5) goal difference.

18 January 2018; 19:00	Uzbekistan	27–38	Japan	Seo-Suwon Chilbo Gymnasium, Suwon; Referees: Lee, Lee (KOR)
18 January 2018; 19:00	Khusanbaev 14	(12–19)	Baig 8	Seo-Suwon Chilbo Gymnasium, Suwon; Referees: Lee, Lee (KOR)
18 January 2018; 19:00	3× (yellow card) 4× (suspension)	Report	2× (yellow card) 3× (suspension)	Seo-Suwon Chilbo Gymnasium, Suwon; Referees: Lee, Lee (KOR)

19 January 2018; 15:00	Iran	37–18	Uzbekistan	Seo-Suwon Chilbo Gymnasium, Suwon; Referees: Imran, Hussein (IRQ)
19 January 2018; 15:00	Norouzinejad 6	(19–12)	Khusanbaev 6	Seo-Suwon Chilbo Gymnasium, Suwon; Referees: Imran, Hussein (IRQ)
19 January 2018; 15:00	3× (yellow card) 1× (suspension)	Report	2× (yellow card) 1× (suspension)	Seo-Suwon Chilbo Gymnasium, Suwon; Referees: Imran, Hussein (IRQ)

20 January 2018; 17:00	Japan	32–37	Iran	Seo-Suwon Chilbo Gymnasium, Suwon; Referees: Pavićević, Ražnatović (MNE)
20 January 2018; 17:00	Tokuda 10	(14–19)	Masaeli 8	Seo-Suwon Chilbo Gymnasium, Suwon; Referees: Pavićević, Ražnatović (MNE)
20 January 2018; 17:00	2× (yellow card) 3× (suspension)	Report	3× (yellow card) 4× (suspension)	Seo-Suwon Chilbo Gymnasium, Suwon; Referees: Pavićević, Ražnatović (MNE)

=== Group B ===
Pos	Team	Pld	W	D	L	GF	GA	GD	Pts	Qualification
1	Bahrain	2	2	0	0	63	33	+30	4	Main round
2	Oman	2	1	0	1	56	49	+7	2	Main round
3	Australia	2	0	0	2	29	66	−37	0	

Source: AHF
Rules for classification: 1) points; 2) head-to-head points; 3) head-to-head goal difference; 4) head-to-head number of goals scored; 5) goal difference.

18 January 2018; 19:00	Australia	10–33	Bahrain	Suwon Gymnasium, Suwon; Referees: Schulze, Tönnier (GER)
18 January 2018; 19:00	Anderson 3	(6–12)	Fadhul 8	Suwon Gymnasium, Suwon; Referees: Schulze, Tönnier (GER)
18 January 2018; 19:00	2× (yellow card) 2× (suspension)	Report	3× (yellow card) 2× (suspension)	Suwon Gymnasium, Suwon; Referees: Schulze, Tönnier (GER)

19 January 2018; 17:00	Oman	33–19	Australia	Seo-Suwon Chilbo Gymnasium, Suwon; Referees: Koo, Lee (KOR)
19 January 2018; 17:00	Al-Dughaishi 7	(16–8)	Bastin 6	Seo-Suwon Chilbo Gymnasium, Suwon; Referees: Koo, Lee (KOR)
19 January 2018; 17:00	4× (yellow card) 7× (suspension) 1× (red card)	Report	3× (yellow card) 5× (suspension) 1× (red card)	Seo-Suwon Chilbo Gymnasium, Suwon; Referees: Koo, Lee (KOR)

20 January 2018; 15:00	Bahrain	30–23	Oman	Seo-Suwon Chilbo Gymnasium, Suwon; Referees: Hizaki, Ikebuchi (JPN)
20 January 2018; 15:00	M. Abdulqader 7	(19–8)	A. Al-Hasanj 8	Seo-Suwon Chilbo Gymnasium, Suwon; Referees: Hizaki, Ikebuchi (JPN)
20 January 2018; 15:00	3× (yellow card) 3× (suspension)	Report	2× (yellow card) 3× (suspension)	Seo-Suwon Chilbo Gymnasium, Suwon; Referees: Hizaki, Ikebuchi (JPN)

=== Group C ===
Pos	Team	Pld	W	D	L	GF	GA	GD	Pts	Qualification
1	South Korea (H)	3	3	0	0	102	63	+39	6	Main round
2	United Arab Emirates	3	2	0	1	97	59	+38	4	Main round
3	India	3	1	0	2	87	87	0	2	
4	Bangladesh	3	0	0	3	46	123	−77	0	

Source: AHF
Rules for classification: 1) points; 2) head-to-head points; 3) head-to-head goal difference; 4) head-to-head number of goals scored; 5) goal difference.
(H) Hosts

18 January 2018; 15:00	Bangladesh	20–46	South Korea	Suwon Gymnasium, Suwon; Referees: Imran, Hussein (IRQ)
18 January 2018; 15:00	three players 4	(8–21)	Sim 8	Suwon Gymnasium, Suwon; Referees: Imran, Hussein (IRQ)
18 January 2018; 15:00	2× (yellow card) 4× (suspension)	Report		Suwon Gymnasium, Suwon; Referees: Imran, Hussein (IRQ)

18 January 2018; 17:00	India	23–41	United Arab Emirates	Suwon Gymnasium, Suwon; Referees: Al-Mawt, Marhoon (BHR)
18 January 2018; 17:00	Harender 6	(10–20)	S. Al-Blooshi 6	Suwon Gymnasium, Suwon; Referees: Al-Mawt, Marhoon (BHR)
18 January 2018; 17:00	2× (yellow card) 3× (suspension)	Report	3× (yellow card) 4× (suspension)	Suwon Gymnasium, Suwon; Referees: Al-Mawt, Marhoon (BHR)

19 January 2018; 17:00	India	23–35	South Korea	Suwon Gymnasium, Suwon; Referees: Cheng, Zhou (CHN)
19 January 2018; 17:00	A. Khatkar 5	(11–21)	Jang 6	Suwon Gymnasium, Suwon; Referees: Cheng, Zhou (CHN)
19 January 2018; 17:00	2× (yellow card) 3× (suspension)	Report	1× (yellow card)	Suwon Gymnasium, Suwon; Referees: Cheng, Zhou (CHN)

19 January 2018; 19:00	Bangladesh	15–36	United Arab Emirates	Suwon Gymnasium, Suwon; Referees: Al-Zayat, Awad (JOR)
19 January 2018; 19:00	Chowdhury 5	(8–17)	W. Al-Blooshi 7	Suwon Gymnasium, Suwon; Referees: Al-Zayat, Awad (JOR)
19 January 2018; 19:00	3× (yellow card) 2× (suspension)	Report	3× (yellow card) 2× (suspension) 1× (red card)	Suwon Gymnasium, Suwon; Referees: Al-Zayat, Awad (JOR)

20 January 2018; 15:00	United Arab Emirates	20–21	South Korea	Suwon Gymnasium, Suwon; Referees: Mousavian, Kolahduzan (IRI)
20 January 2018; 15:00	A. Al-Blooshi 6	(9–8)	Jo, Yoon 5	Suwon Gymnasium, Suwon; Referees: Mousavian, Kolahduzan (IRI)
20 January 2018; 15:00	3× (yellow card) 4× (suspension)	Report	2× (yellow card) 5× (suspension)	Suwon Gymnasium, Suwon; Referees: Mousavian, Kolahduzan (IRI)

20 January 2018; 19:00	Bangladesh	11–41	India	Seo-Suwon Chilbo Gymnasium, Suwon; Referees: Lee, Lee (KOR)
20 January 2018; 19:00	Chowdhury 4	(2–19)	D'Cunha 8	Seo-Suwon Chilbo Gymnasium, Suwon; Referees: Lee, Lee (KOR)
20 January 2018; 19:00	3× (yellow card) 4× (suspension)	Report	3× (yellow card) 2× (suspension)	Seo-Suwon Chilbo Gymnasium, Suwon; Referees: Lee, Lee (KOR)

=== Group D ===
Pos	Team	Pld	W	D	L	GF	GA	GD	Pts	Qualification
1	Qatar	3	3	0	0	122	53	+69	6	Main round
2	Saudi Arabia	3	2	0	1	92	66	+26	4	Main round
3	China	3	1	0	2	74	78	−4	2	
4	New Zealand	3	0	0	3	40	131	−91	0	

Source: AHF
Rules for classification: 1) points; 2) head-to-head points; 3) head-to-head goal difference; 4) head-to-head number of goals scored; 5) goal difference.

18 January 2018; 15:00	China	24–30	Saudi Arabia	Seo-Suwon Chilbo Gymnasium, Suwon; Referees: Lee, Koo (KOR)
18 January 2018; 15:00	Zhao 4	(11–13)	Hassan 6	Seo-Suwon Chilbo Gymnasium, Suwon; Referees: Lee, Koo (KOR)
18 January 2018; 15:00	3× (yellow card) 5× (suspension)	Report	1× (yellow card) 3× (suspension)	Seo-Suwon Chilbo Gymnasium, Suwon; Referees: Lee, Koo (KOR)

18 January 2018; 17:00	New Zealand	14–58	Qatar	Seo-Suwon Chilbo Gymnasium, Suwon; Referees: Hizaki, Ikebuchi (JPN)
18 January 2018; 17:00	Fitzpatrick 4	(11–27)	Madadi, Zouaoui 11	Seo-Suwon Chilbo Gymnasium, Suwon; Referees: Hizaki, Ikebuchi (JPN)
18 January 2018; 17:00	2× (suspension)	Report	1× (yellow card)	Seo-Suwon Chilbo Gymnasium, Suwon; Referees: Hizaki, Ikebuchi (JPN)

19 January 2018; 15:00	China	19–34	Qatar	Suwon Gymnasium, Suwon; Attendance: 300; Referees: Mousavian, Kolahduzan (IRI)
19 January 2018; 15:00	Zhao 5	(8–16)	Frankis 7	Suwon Gymnasium, Suwon; Attendance: 300; Referees: Mousavian, Kolahduzan (IRI)
19 January 2018; 15:00	3× (yellow card) 3× (suspension) 1× (red card)	Report	3× (yellow card) 6× (suspension)	Suwon Gymnasium, Suwon; Attendance: 300; Referees: Mousavian, Kolahduzan (IRI)

19 January 2018; 19:00	New Zealand	12–42	Saudi Arabia	Seo-Suwon Chilbo Gymnasium, Suwon; Referees: Pavićević, Ražnatović (MNE)
19 January 2018; 19:00	Fitzpatrick 4	(6–20)	Al-Abbas 11	Seo-Suwon Chilbo Gymnasium, Suwon; Referees: Pavićević, Ražnatović (MNE)
19 January 2018; 19:00	2× (yellow card) 2× (suspension)	Report	1× (yellow card) 2× (suspension)	Seo-Suwon Chilbo Gymnasium, Suwon; Referees: Pavićević, Ražnatović (MNE)

20 January 2018; 17:00	New Zealand	14–31	China	Suwon Gymnasium, Suwon; Referees: Al-Zayat, Awad (JOR)
20 January 2018; 17:00	Lang 5	(7–16)	Wang 5	Suwon Gymnasium, Suwon; Referees: Al-Zayat, Awad (JOR)
20 January 2018; 17:00	3× (yellow card) 4× (suspension)	Report	3× (yellow card) 2× (suspension)	Suwon Gymnasium, Suwon; Referees: Al-Zayat, Awad (JOR)

20 January 2018; 19:00	Saudi Arabia	20–30	Qatar	Suwon Gymnasium, Suwon; Referees: Schulze, Tönnies (GER)
20 January 2018; 19:00	Al-Obaidi 3	(10–21)	Zouaoui 8	Suwon Gymnasium, Suwon; Referees: Schulze, Tönnies (GER)
20 January 2018; 19:00	2× (yellow card) 5× (suspension)	Report	3× (yellow card) 5× (suspension)	Suwon Gymnasium, Suwon; Referees: Schulze, Tönnies (GER)

== Classement round ==
=== Group 3 ===
Pos	Team	Pld	W	D	L	GF	GA	GD	Pts
1	Uzbekistan	2	2	0	0	62	46	+16	4
2	India	2	1	0	1	65	53	+12	2
3	New Zealand	2	0	0	2	43	71	−28	0

Source: AHF
Rules for classification: 1) points; 2) head-to-head points; 3) head-to-head goal difference; 4) head-to-head number of goals scored; 5) goal difference.

22 January 2018; 15:00	New Zealand	19–33	Uzbekistan	Seo-Suwon Chilbo Gymnasium, Suwon; Referees: Al-Zayat, Awad (JOR)
22 January 2018; 15:00	Lang 5	(8–13)	Khusanbaev 8	Seo-Suwon Chilbo Gymnasium, Suwon; Referees: Al-Zayat, Awad (JOR)
22 January 2018; 15:00	3× (yellow card) 4× (suspension) 1× (red card)	Report	3× (yellow card) 6× (suspension) 1× (red card)	Seo-Suwon Chilbo Gymnasium, Suwon; Referees: Al-Zayat, Awad (JOR)

23 January 2018; 15:00	India	38–24	New Zealand	Seo-Suwon Chilbo Gymnasium, Suwon; Referees: Cheng, Zhou (CHN)
23 January 2018; 15:00	Ankit, Singh 6	(17–10)	Lang 7	Seo-Suwon Chilbo Gymnasium, Suwon; Referees: Cheng, Zhou (CHN)
23 January 2018; 15:00	1× (yellow card) 3× (suspension)	Report	2× (yellow card) 2× (suspension)	Seo-Suwon Chilbo Gymnasium, Suwon; Referees: Cheng, Zhou (CHN)

24 January 2018; 15:00	Uzbekistan	29–27	India	Suwon Gymnasium, Suwon; Referees: Lee, Lee (KOR)
24 January 2018; 15:00	Khusanbaev 13	(12–16)	Singh, Singh 6	Suwon Gymnasium, Suwon; Referees: Lee, Lee (KOR)
24 January 2018; 15:00	3× (yellow card) 2× (suspension)	Report	2× (yellow card) 6× (suspension)	Suwon Gymnasium, Suwon; Referees: Lee, Lee (KOR)

=== Group 4 ===
Pos	Team	Pld	W	D	L	GF	GA	GD	Pts
1	China	2	2	0	0	61	26	+35	4
2	Australia	2	1	0	1	51	48	+3	2
3	Bangladesh	2	0	0	2	32	70	−38	0

Source: AHF
Rules for classification: 1) points; 2) head-to-head points; 3) head-to-head goal difference; 4) head-to-head number of goals scored; 5) goal difference.

22 January 2018; 17:00	Bangladesh	22–35	Australia	Seo-Suwon Chilbo Gymnasium, Suwon; Referees: Cheng, Zhou (CHN)
22 January 2018; 17:00	Emon 5	(15–16)	Anderson 7	Seo-Suwon Chilbo Gymnasium, Suwon; Referees: Cheng, Zhou (CHN)
22 January 2018; 17:00	2× (yellow card) 4× (suspension) 1× (red card)	Report	2× (yellow card) 8× (suspension)	Seo-Suwon Chilbo Gymnasium, Suwon; Referees: Cheng, Zhou (CHN)

23 January 2018; 17:00	China	35–10	Bangladesh	Seo-Suwon Chilbo Gymnasium, Suwon; Referees: Lee, Lee (KOR)
23 January 2018; 17:00	three players 5	(19–6)	Hasan, Rana 3	Seo-Suwon Chilbo Gymnasium, Suwon; Referees: Lee, Lee (KOR)
23 January 2018; 17:00	2× (yellow card) 1× (suspension)	Report	1× (yellow card) 3× (suspension) 1× (red card)	Seo-Suwon Chilbo Gymnasium, Suwon; Referees: Lee, Lee (KOR)

24 January 2018; 15:00	Australia	16–26	China	Seo-Suwon Chilbo Gymnasium, Suwon; Referees: Mousavian, Kolahduzan (IRI)
24 January 2018; 15:00	Warrener 4	(8–14)	Wang 11	Seo-Suwon Chilbo Gymnasium, Suwon; Referees: Mousavian, Kolahduzan (IRI)
24 January 2018; 15:00	3× (yellow card) 6× (suspension)	Report	2× (yellow card) 4× (suspension)	Seo-Suwon Chilbo Gymnasium, Suwon; Referees: Mousavian, Kolahduzan (IRI)

=== Placement matches ===
==== 13th place game ====
26 January 2018; 11:00	New Zealand	24–31	Bangladesh	Seo-Suwon Chilbo Gymnasium, Suwon; Referees: Cheng, Zhou (CHN)
26 January 2018; 11:00	Lang 9	(10–16)	Hasan 7	Seo-Suwon Chilbo Gymnasium, Suwon; Referees: Cheng, Zhou (CHN)
26 January 2018; 11:00	3× (yellow card) 2× (suspension)	Report	2× (yellow card) 6× (suspension)	Seo-Suwon Chilbo Gymnasium, Suwon; Referees: Cheng, Zhou (CHN)

==== Eleventh place game ====
26 January 2018; 13:00	India	24–27	Australia	Seo-Suwon Chilbo Gymnasium, Suwon; Referees: Imran, Hussein (IRQ)
26 January 2018; 13:00	Bidhuri, Singh 4	(12–10)	Szklarski 10	Seo-Suwon Chilbo Gymnasium, Suwon; Referees: Imran, Hussein (IRQ)
26 January 2018; 13:00	3× (yellow card) 3× (suspension)	Report	3× (yellow card) 6× (suspension)	Seo-Suwon Chilbo Gymnasium, Suwon; Referees: Imran, Hussein (IRQ)

==== Ninth place game ====
26 January 2018; 15:00	Uzbekistan	21–32	China	Seo-Suwon Chilbo Gymnasium, Suwon; Referees: Lee, Lee (KOR)
26 January 2018; 15:00	Takhirov 6	(8–19)	Jialei, Wang 8	Seo-Suwon Chilbo Gymnasium, Suwon; Referees: Lee, Lee (KOR)
26 January 2018; 15:00	1× (yellow card) 2× (suspension)	Report	3× (yellow card) 4× (suspension)	Seo-Suwon Chilbo Gymnasium, Suwon; Referees: Lee, Lee (KOR)

== Main round ==
=== Group 1 ===
Pos	Team	Pld	W	D	L	GF	GA	GD	Pts	Qualification
1	Saudi Arabia	3	3	0	0	78	66	+12	6	Semifinals
2	South Korea (H)	3	2	0	1	80	78	+2	4	Semifinals
3	Iran	3	1	0	2	88	79	+9	2	
4	Oman	3	0	0	3	72	95	−23	0	

Source: AHF
Rules for classification: 1) points; 2) head-to-head points; 3) head-to-head goal difference; 4) head-to-head number of goals scored; 5) goal difference.
(H) Hosts

22 January 2018; 15:00	Saudi Arabia	26–23	Iran	Suwon Gymnasium, Suwon; Referees: Pavićević, Ražnatović (MNE)
22 January 2018; 15:00	Al-Abdulali 6	(12–11)	Kazemi 7	Suwon Gymnasium, Suwon; Referees: Pavićević, Ražnatović (MNE)
22 January 2018; 15:00	2× (yellow card) 5× (suspension)	Report	1× (yellow card) 9× (suspension) 1× (red card)	Suwon Gymnasium, Suwon; Referees: Pavićević, Ražnatović (MNE)

22 January 2018; 17:00	South Korea	29–27	Oman	Suwon Gymnasium, Suwon; Referees: Al-Mawt, Marhoon (BHR)
22 January 2018; 17:00	Jeong Y. 8	(12–13)	Al-Hasani 11	Suwon Gymnasium, Suwon; Referees: Al-Mawt, Marhoon (BHR)
22 January 2018; 17:00	1× (yellow card) 6× (suspension)	Report	3× (yellow card) 6× (suspension)	Suwon Gymnasium, Suwon; Referees: Al-Mawt, Marhoon (BHR)

23 January 2018; 15:00	Oman	20–26	Saudi Arabia	Suwon Gymnasium, Suwon; Referees: Hizaki, Ikebuchi (JPN)
23 January 2018; 15:00	Al-Dughaishi 7	(10–13)	Al-Obaidi 4	Suwon Gymnasium, Suwon; Referees: Hizaki, Ikebuchi (JPN)
23 January 2018; 15:00	3× (yellow card) 4× (suspension) 1× (red card)	Report	2× (yellow card) 2× (suspension)	Suwon Gymnasium, Suwon; Referees: Hizaki, Ikebuchi (JPN)

23 January 2018; 19:00	Iran	25–28	South Korea	Suwon Gymnasium, Suwon; Referees: Schulze, Tönnies (GER)
23 January 2018; 19:00	S. Esteki 7	(10–16)	Yoon 7	Suwon Gymnasium, Suwon; Referees: Schulze, Tönnies (GER)
23 January 2018; 19:00	3× (yellow card) 7× (suspension)	Report	2× (yellow card) 10× (suspension)	Suwon Gymnasium, Suwon; Referees: Schulze, Tönnies (GER)

24 January 2018; 17:00	Saudi Arabia	26–23	South Korea	Suwon Gymnasium, Suwon; Referees: Al-Mawt, Marhoon (BHR)
24 January 2018; 17:00	Hassan 5	(11–12)	Eom 5	Suwon Gymnasium, Suwon; Referees: Al-Mawt, Marhoon (BHR)
24 January 2018; 17:00	3× (yellow card) 8× (suspension) 1× (red card)	Report	2× (yellow card) 5× (suspension)	Suwon Gymnasium, Suwon; Referees: Al-Mawt, Marhoon (BHR)

24 January 2018; 17:00	Iran	40–25	Oman	Seo-Suwon Chilbo Gymnasium, Suwon; Referees: Koo, Lee (KOR)
24 January 2018; 17:00	Masaeli, Nosrati 7	(22–12)	Al-Dughaishi, Al-Hasani 8	Seo-Suwon Chilbo Gymnasium, Suwon; Referees: Koo, Lee (KOR)
24 January 2018; 17:00	2× (yellow card) 3× (suspension)	Report	1× (yellow card) 5× (suspension)	Seo-Suwon Chilbo Gymnasium, Suwon; Referees: Koo, Lee (KOR)

=== Group 2 ===
Pos	Team	Pld	W	D	L	GF	GA	GD	Pts	Qualification
1	Qatar	3	3	0	0	103	64	+39	6	Semifinals
2	Bahrain	3	2	0	1	78	72	+6	4	Semifinals
3	Japan	3	1	0	2	71	89	−18	2	
4	United Arab Emirates	3	0	0	3	62	89	−27	0	

Source: AHF
Rules for classification: 1) points; 2) head-to-head points; 3) head-to-head goal difference; 4) head-to-head number of goals scored; 5) goal difference.

22 January 2018; 19:00	Qatar	40–23	Japan	Suwon Gymnasium, Suwon; Referees: Koo, Lee (KOR)
22 January 2018; 19:00	Frankis, Romane 5	(19–9)	five players 3	Suwon Gymnasium, Suwon; Referees: Koo, Lee (KOR)
22 January 2018; 19:00	1× (yellow card) 3× (suspension)	Report	3× (yellow card) 2× (suspension)	Suwon Gymnasium, Suwon; Referees: Koo, Lee (KOR)

22 January 2018; 19:00	United Arab Emirates	22–28	Bahrain	Seo-Suwon Chilbo Gymnasium, Suwon; Referees: Schulze, Tönnies (GER)
22 January 2018; 19:00	Al-Blooshi, Al-Blooshi 5	(11–13)	Abdulqader 6	Seo-Suwon Chilbo Gymnasium, Suwon; Referees: Schulze, Tönnies (GER)
22 January 2018; 19:00	2× (yellow card) 7× (suspension) 1× (red card)	Report	3× (yellow card) 7× (suspension) 1× (red card)	Seo-Suwon Chilbo Gymnasium, Suwon; Referees: Schulze, Tönnies (GER)

23 January 2018; 17:00	Bahrain	21–29	Qatar	Seo-Suwon Chilbo Gymnasium, Suwon; Referees: Koo, Lee (KOR)
23 January 2018; 17:00	Fadhul, Habib 5	(11–13)	Frankis 7	Seo-Suwon Chilbo Gymnasium, Suwon; Referees: Koo, Lee (KOR)
23 January 2018; 17:00	3× (yellow card) 4× (suspension)	Report	3× (yellow card) 3× (suspension)	Seo-Suwon Chilbo Gymnasium, Suwon; Referees: Koo, Lee (KOR)

23 January 2018; 19:00	Japan	27–20	United Arab Emirates	Suwon Gymnasium, Suwon; Referees: Imran, Hussein (IRQ)
23 January 2018; 19:00	Shida 6	(14–9)	Al-Blooshi 4	Suwon Gymnasium, Suwon; Referees: Imran, Hussein (IRQ)
23 January 2018; 19:00	2× (yellow card) 3× (suspension)	Report	1× (yellow card) 4× (suspension)	Suwon Gymnasium, Suwon; Referees: Imran, Hussein (IRQ)

24 January 2018; 19:00	Japan	21–29	Bahrain	Suwon Gymnasium, Suwon; Referees: Pavićević, Ražnatović (MNE)
24 January 2018; 19:00	Agarie, Watanabe 6	(13–13)	Saad 9	Suwon Gymnasium, Suwon; Referees: Pavićević, Ražnatović (MNE)
24 January 2018; 19:00	3× (yellow card) 2× (suspension)	Report	2× (yellow card) 6× (suspension)	Suwon Gymnasium, Suwon; Referees: Pavićević, Ražnatović (MNE)

24 January 2018; 19:00	Qatar	34–20	United Arab Emirates	Seo-Suwon Chilbo Gymnasium, Suwon; Referees: Hizaki, Ikebuchi (JPN)
24 January 2018; 19:00	Romane 9	(18–11)	Al-Blooshi 5	Seo-Suwon Chilbo Gymnasium, Suwon; Referees: Hizaki, Ikebuchi (JPN)
24 January 2018; 19:00	1× (yellow card) 2× (suspension) 1× (red card)	Report	2× (yellow card) 3× (suspension)	Seo-Suwon Chilbo Gymnasium, Suwon; Referees: Hizaki, Ikebuchi (JPN)

== Knockout stage ==
=== Bracket ===
Semi-finals
26 January 2018
Saudi Arabia	22
Bahrain	24
26 January 2018
Qatar	32
South Korea	21

Final
28 January 2018
Bahrain	31
Qatar	33
Third place
28 January 2018
Saudi Arabia	21
South Korea	29

=== Semifinals ===
26 January 2018; 17:00	Qatar	32–21	South Korea	Suwon Gymnasium, Suwon; Referees: Pavićević, Ražnatović (MNE)
26 January 2018; 17:00	Frankis 8	(14–8)	Eom 6	Suwon Gymnasium, Suwon; Referees: Pavićević, Ražnatović (MNE)
26 January 2018; 17:00	3× (yellow card) 5× (suspension)	Report	2× (yellow card) 5× (suspension)	Suwon Gymnasium, Suwon; Referees: Pavićević, Ražnatović (MNE)

26 January 2018; 19:00	Saudi Arabia	22–24	Bahrain	Suwon Gymnasium, Suwon; Referees: Schulze, Tönnies (GER)
26 January 2018; 19:00	Al-Hannabi 8	(11–11)	M. Abdulqader 4	Suwon Gymnasium, Suwon; Referees: Schulze, Tönnies (GER)
26 January 2018; 19:00	3× (yellow card) 4× (suspension)	Report	2× (yellow card) 8× (suspension) 2× (red card)	Suwon Gymnasium, Suwon; Referees: Schulze, Tönnies (GER)

=== Seventh place game ===
26 January 2018; 17:00	Oman	24–28	United Arab Emirates	Seo-Suwon Chilbo Gymnasium, Suwon; Referees: Al-Mawt, Marhoon (BHR)
26 January 2018; 17:00	Al-Hasani 8	(12–14)	Al-Bannai 8	Seo-Suwon Chilbo Gymnasium, Suwon; Referees: Al-Mawt, Marhoon (BHR)
26 January 2018; 17:00	3× (yellow card) 5× (suspension)	Report	3× (yellow card) 4× (suspension)	Seo-Suwon Chilbo Gymnasium, Suwon; Referees: Al-Mawt, Marhoon (BHR)

=== Fifth place game ===
26 January 2018; 15:00	Iran	33–28	Japan	Suwon Gymnasium, Suwon; Referees: Koo, Lee (KOR)
26 January 2018; 15:00	Heidarpour 8	(15–15)	Motoki 6	Suwon Gymnasium, Suwon; Referees: Koo, Lee (KOR)
26 January 2018; 15:00	3× (yellow card) 4× (suspension)	Report	2× (yellow card) 4× (suspension)	Suwon Gymnasium, Suwon; Referees: Koo, Lee (KOR)

=== Third place game ===
28 January 2018; 14:30	South Korea	29–21	Saudi Arabia	Suwon Gymnasium, Suwon; Referees: Schulze, Tönnies (GER)
28 January 2018; 14:30	Yoon 9	(16–6)	Hassan, Al-Hannabi 4	Suwon Gymnasium, Suwon; Referees: Schulze, Tönnies (GER)
28 January 2018; 14:30	3× (yellow card) 4× (suspension)	Report	3× (yellow card) 5× (suspension)	Suwon Gymnasium, Suwon; Referees: Schulze, Tönnies (GER)

=== Final ===
28 January 2018; 17:00	Qatar	33–31	Bahrain	Suwon Gymnasium, Suwon; Referees: Pavićević, Ražnatović (MNE)
28 January 2018; 17:00	Frankis, Roiné 8	(16–17)	Fadhul 7	Suwon Gymnasium, Suwon; Referees: Pavićević, Ražnatović (MNE)
28 January 2018; 17:00	2× (yellow card) 4× (suspension)	Report	3× (yellow card) 3× (suspension)	Suwon Gymnasium, Suwon; Referees: Pavićević, Ražnatović (MNE)

== Final standing ==
Team qualified for the 2019 World Championship

Team qualified for the 2019 World Championship as a wild-card.

Rank	Team
1st place, gold medalist(s)	Qatar
2nd place, silver medalist(s)	Bahrain
3rd place, bronze medalist(s)	South Korea
4	Saudi Arabia
5	Iran
6	Japan
7	United Arab Emirates
8	Oman
9	China
10	Uzbekistan
11	Australia
12	India
13	Bangladesh
14	New Zealand
