= Qatar men's national handball team =

Men's national handball team representing Qatar

Qatar

Information
- Association: Qatar Handball Association
- Coach: Ambros Martín
- Assistant coach: Jesús García; Danijel Šarić
- Most caps: Abdulrazzaq Murad (78)
- Ranking: #70 (108 points)

Colours
1st	2nd

Results

Summer Olympics
- Appearances: 1 (First in 2016)
- Best result: 8th (2016)

World Championship
- Appearances: 11 (First in 2003)
- Best result: (silver) 2nd (2015)

Asian Championship
- Appearances: 18 (First in 1983)
- Best result: (gold) 1st (2014, 2016, 2018, 2020, 2022, 2024)
- Last updated on Unknown.

Qatar men's national handball team
Medal record

World Championship
Silver medal – second place	2015 Qatar	

Asian Championship
Gold medal – first place	2014 Bahrain	
Gold medal – first place	2016 Bahrain	
Gold medal – first place	2018 South Korea	
Gold medal – first place	2020 Kuwait	
Gold medal – first place	2022 Saudi Arabia	
Gold medal – first place	2024 Bahrain	
Silver medal – second place	2002 Iran	
Silver medal – second place	2012 Saudi Arabia	
Silver medal – second place	2026 Kuwait	
Bronze medal – third place	2004 Qatar	
Bronze medal – third place	2006 Thailand	

The Qatar national handball team is controlled by the Qatar Handball Association and take part in international handball competitions.

Qatar is one of the strongest teams in Asia having the second most Asian Championships after South Korea. They also have the distinction of being the only non-European side to reach the final of the Men's World Handball Championship, when they finished as runners-up at the 2015 edition, losing to France in a close contest (22–25) on home soil. The tournament was however seen as controversial, as a large number of players in the Qatar team had been naturalised in the years leading up to the championship.

== Honours ==
- Asian Men's Handball Championship:

Winners: 2014, 2016, 2018, 2020, 2022, 2024

- Asian Games:

Winners: 2014, 2018

== Results ==
=== Summer Olympics ===
- 2016 – 8th place

=== World Championship ===
- 2003 – 16th place
- 2005 – 21st place
- 2007 – 23rd place
- 2013 – 20th place
- 2015 – 2nd place
- 2017 – 8th place
- 2019 – 13th place
- 2021 – 8th place
- 2023 – 22nd place
- 2025 – 21st place
- 2027 – Qualified

=== Asian Championship ===
- 1983 – 6th place
- 1987 – 6th place
- 1989 – 6th place
- 1991 – 4th place
- 1993 – 7th place
- 2002 – 2nd place
- 2004 – 3rd place
- 2006 – 3rd place
- 2008 – 5th place
- 2010 – 5th place
- 2012 – 2nd place
- 2014 – 1st place
- 2016 – 1st place
- 2018 – 1st place
- 2020 – 1st place
- 2022 – 1st place
- 2024 – 1st place
- 2026 – 2nd place

== Current squad ==
Squad for the 2025 World Men's Handball Championship.

Head coach: (Montenegro) Veselin Vujović

No.	Pos.	Name	Date of birth (age)	Height	App.	Goals	Club
1	RB	Žarko Marković	1 June 1986 (age 40)	1.96 m	13	31	(Qatar) Al-Gharafa
7	LW	Ahmad Madadi	31 August 1994 (age 32)	1.75 m	97	298	(Qatar) Al Duhail
9	LB	Rafael Capote	5 October 1987 (age 39)	2.00 m	91	348	(Qatar) Al Duhail
10	LB	Frankis Carol	7 September 1987 (age 39)	1.91 m	70	235	Kuwait SC
11	LW	Abdulrazzaq Ahmad	29 June 1990 (age 36)	1.86 m	114	177	(Qatar) Al-Gharafa
12	GK	Bilal Lepenica	26 December 1996 (age 29)	1.91 m	50	0	(Qatar) Al Duhail
13	RW	Eldar Memišević	21 June 1992 (age 34)	1.78 m	120	232	(Qatar) Al-Rayyan
16	GK	Irhad Alihodžić	22 December 1996 (age 29)	1.85 m	20	0	(Qatar) Al Arabi
17	LB	Amir Nowraddine	7 March 1995 (age 31)	1.90 m	77	unknown	(Qatar) Al-Gharafa
22	CB	Abdelrahman Tarek	1 January 1994 (age 32)	1.89 m	70	106	(Qatar) Al Duhail
23	RW	Allaedine Berrached	31 January 1994 (age 32)	1.86 m	87	179	(Qatar) Al Duhail
24	CB	Wajdi Sinen	17 September 1990 (age 36)	1.93 m	93	298	(Qatar) Al Arabi
28	RW	Nidhal Aissa	8 June 1991 (age 35)	1.88 m	18	20	(Qatar) Al Arabi
37	P	Yassine Sami	1 May 1985 (age 41)	1.91 m	46	42	(Qatar) Al Wakrah
41	P	Youssef Benali	28 May 1987 (age 39)	1.90 m	107	186	(Qatar) Al Rayyan
44	LB	Amine Guehis	23 March 1996 (age 30)	2.03 m	54	134	(Qatar) Al Duhail
88	CB	Moustafa Heiba	17 December 1996 (age 29)	1.84 m	94	175	(Qatar) Al Duhail
93	LW	Hamdi Ayed	16 August 1993 (age 33)	1.88 m	80	109	(Qatar) Al Duhail
94	LB	Ameen Zakkar	15 June 1994 (age 32)	1.98 m	85	120	(Qatar) Al Rayyan
98	GK	Anadin Suljaković	16 June 1998 (age 28)	1.96 m	43	0	(Germany) HSG Wetzlar

=== Statistics ===
Most Appearances
Name	Matches
Eldar Memišević	120
Wajdi Sinen	120
Abdulrazzaq Ahmad	120
Amin Zakar	111
Rafael Capote	111
Mahmoud Hassaballa	109
Youssef Benali	107
Moustafa Heiba	104
Ahmad Madadi	101
Mohsen Al Yafei	96
Aladin Balashed	95
Kamal Al Din Mallash	94

Top Scorers
Name	Goals
Ahmed Al Saad	435
Ahmad Madadi	404
Rafael Capote	381
Frankis Carol	345
Youssef Benali	335
Wajdi Sinen	333
Nasser Al Saad	288
Abdulrazzaq Ahmad	274
Abdullah Al Saad	271
Burhan Al-Turki	259
Mubarak Al Ali	254

== Controversy ==
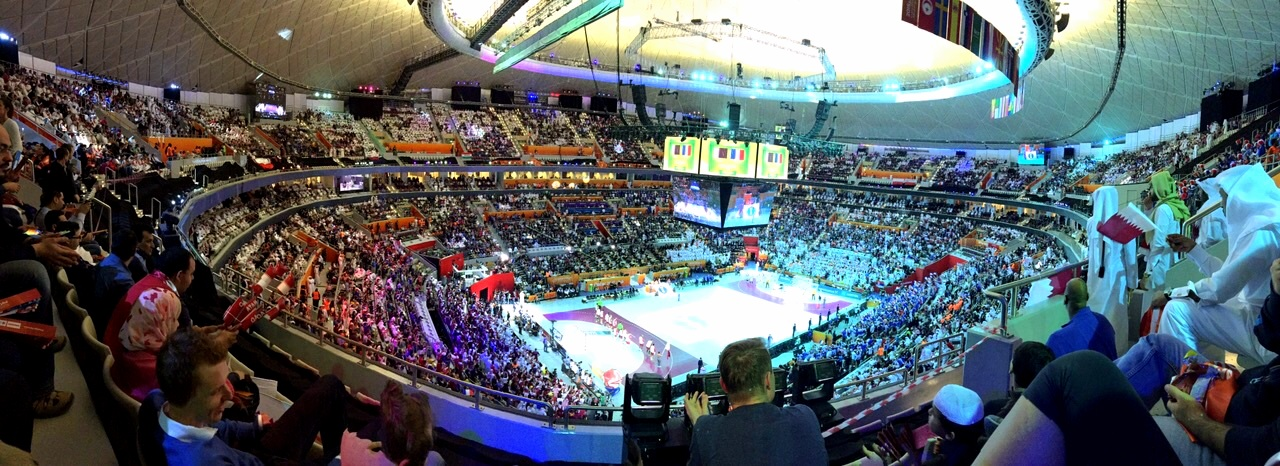
2015 World Men's Handball Championship final, Qatar vs France

=== Player naturalisation ===
The Qatari national team naturalized a large number of foreign players to their squad for the 2015 World Men's Handball Championship.

According to IHF rules, to gain eligibility for a new national team, a player cannot have played for another nation for three years in an official match. This allowed several foreign-born players, including Spanish-born Borja Vidal, Goran Stojanović and Jovo Damjanović from Montenegro, and Bertrand Roiné who previously played for France, to play for the Qatar team at the championship.

Head of the Qatar Handball Federation, Ahmed Mohammed Abdulrab Al Shaabi, acknowledged the policy in a statement in June 2013, saying "We're a small nation with limited human resources, so we had to bring players from outside in the past." He also announced an end to the policy at the time, adding however that they "[might] make an exception only in the case of an experienced goalkeeper." In January 2014, Danish sports agent Mads Winther said he had met with "contacts involved with Qatar" regarding the possibility of naturalising Danish players.

The practice was criticised by Austrian goalkeeper Thomas Bauer after his team's loss to Qatar in the quarter-final, saying "It [felt] like playing against a world selection team" and "I think it is not the sense of a world championship." At a press conference during the championship, Qatar head coach Valero Rivera declined to comment on the matter. Spanish player Joan Cañellas did not think it was an issue, saying "If they can do it, why not."

After the controversial semi-final against Poland, and reaching the final as a result, the practice was even more criticised, with players such as Danijel Šarić having now represented four different national teams.

=== Paid fans ===
Qatar flew in about 60 Spanish fans to cheer for Qatar during the 2015 World Championship.

=== Accusation Refereeing favouritism ===
The referees were widely accused of being one-sided in favour of Qatar during its success, 2nd place in the 2015 World Championship. Especially at the last-16 encounter against Austria, the quarterfinal against Germany and the semi-final against Poland. After the final whistle, the Polish players showed their disgust by sarcastically applauding the three referees.
