= Iran at the 2005 West Asian Games =

- IOC code: IRI
- NOC: National Olympic Committee of the Islamic Republic of Iran
- Website: www.olympic.ir (in Persian and English)

in Doha
- Competitors: 117 in 10 sports
- Flag bearer: Peyman Akbari
- Medals Ranked 3rd: Gold 20 Silver 25 Bronze 16 Total 61

West Asian Games appearances
- 1997; 2002; 2005

Iran participated in the 3rd West Asian Games held in Doha, Qatar from December 1, 2005 to December 10, 2005. Iran ranked 3rd with 20 gold medals in this edition of the West Asian Games.

== Competitors ==
| Sport | Men | Women | Total |
|---|---|---|---|
| Aquatics, Diving | 4 | | 4 |
| Aquatics, Swimming | 8 | | 8 |
| Athletics | 17 | 4 | 21 |
| Bowling | 6 | | 6 |
| Fencing | 6 | | 6 |
| Football | 20 | | 20 |
| Gymnastics | 6 | | 6 |
| Handball | 16 | | 16 |
| Shooting | 7 | 4 | 11 |
| Volleyball | 12 | | 12 |
| Weightlifting | 7 | | 7 |
| Total | 109 | 8 | 117 |

== Medal summary ==
=== Medal table ===
| Sport | Gold | Silver | Bronze | Total |
|---|---|---|---|---|
| Aquatics, Diving | 2 | 2 | 1 | 5 |
| Aquatics, Swimming | 6 | 6 | 3 | 15 |
| Athletics | 4 | 4 | 5 | 13 |
| Fencing | 2 | 2 | 1 | 5 |
| Football | | | 1 | 1 |
| Gymnastics | | 3 | 2 | 5 |
| Handball | | 1 | | 1 |
| Shooting | 4 | 3 | 3 | 10 |
| Volleyball | | 1 | | 1 |
| Weightlifting | 2 | 3 | | 5 |
| Total | 20 | 25 | 16 | 61 |

=== Medalists ===
| Medal | Name | Sport | Event |
|---|---|---|---|
| Gold | Saeid Taghbostani | Aquatics, Diving | Men's 10 m platform |
| Gold | Ghaem Mirabian; Saeid Taghbostani | Aquatics, Diving | Men's synchronized 10 m platform |
| Gold | Hamid Reza Mobarrez | Aquatics, Swimming | Men's 50 m freestyle |
| Gold | Soheil Maleka Ashtiani | Aquatics, Swimming | Men's 200 m freestyle |
| Gold | Mohammad Alirezaei | Aquatics, Swimming | Men's 50 m breaststroke |
| Gold | Mohammad Alirezaei | Aquatics, Swimming | Men's 100 m breaststroke |
| Gold | Hamid Reza Mobarrez | Aquatics, Swimming | Men's 50 m butterfly |
| Gold | Shahin Baradaran; Mohammad Alirezaei; Hamid Reza Mobarrez; Pasha Vahdati | Aquatics, Swimming | Men's 4 × 100 m medley relay |
| Gold | Ehsan Haddadi | Athletics | Men's discus throw |
| Gold | Ali Feizi | Athletics | Men's decathlon |
| Gold | Padideh Bolourizadeh; Melani Artoun; Zahra Nabizadeh; Nafiseh Mataei | Athletics | Women's 4 × 100 m relay |
| Gold | Zahra Nabizadeh | Athletics | Women's high jump |
| Gold | Ali Yaghoubian | Fencing | Men's individual épée |
| Gold | Mojtaba Abedini | Fencing | Men's individual sabre |
| Gold | Hossein Hosseini | Shooting | Men's 10 m air pistol |
| Gold | Ebrahim Barkhordari; Hossein Hosseini; Mohsen Nasr Esfahani | Shooting | Men's 10 m air pistol team |
| Gold | Nasim Hassanpour | Shooting | Women's 10 m air pistol |
| Gold | Shokoufeh Akasheh; Nasim Hassanpour; Zeinab Ramezani | Shooting | Women's 10 m air pistol team |
| Gold | Sajjad Behrouzi | Weightlifting | Men's 56 kg |
| Gold | Asghar Ebrahimi | Weightlifting | Men's 94 kg |
| Silver | Ghaem Mirabian | Aquatics, Diving | Men's 3 m springboard |
| Silver | Ghaem Mirabian; Saeid Taghbostani | Aquatics, Diving | Men's synchronized 3 m springboard |
| Silver | Shahin Baradaran | Aquatics, Swimming | Men's 50 m backstroke |
| Silver | Shahin Baradaran | Aquatics, Swimming | Men's 200 m backstroke |
| Silver | Hamid Reza Mobarrez | Aquatics, Swimming | Men's 100 m butterfly |
| Silver | Shahin Baradaran | Aquatics, Swimming | Men's 200 m individual medley |
| Silver | Pasha Vahdati; Emin Noshadi; Shahin Baradaran; Soheil Maleka Ashtiani | Aquatics, Swimming | Men's 4 × 100 m freestyle relay |
| Silver | Emin Noshadi; Mohammad Bidarian; Shahin Baradaran; Soheil Maleka Ashtiani | Aquatics, Swimming | Men's 4 × 200 m freestyle relay |
| Silver | Rouhollah Asgari | Athletics | Men's 110 m hurdles |
| Silver | Eshagh Ghaffari | Athletics | Men's pole vault |
| Silver | Ayoub Arokhi | Athletics | Men's decathlon |
| Silver | Hadi Sepehrzad | Athletics | Men's high jump |
| Silver | Javad Rezaei | Fencing | Men's individual foil |
| Silver | Peyman Fakhri | Fencing | Men's individual sabre |
| Silver | Ali Azizi; Hamid Reza Babaei; Kambiz Hajmohammadi; Nader Hanifi; Ali Asghar Marzban; Soroush Pouladian | Gymnastics | Men's team |
| Silver | Kambiz Hajmohammadi | Gymnastics | Men's pommel horse |
| Silver | Hamid Reza Babaei | Gymnastics | Men's parallel bars |
| Silver | Iman Ehsannejad; Mohammad Reza Rajabi; Mohammad Reza Jafarnia; Hani Zamani; Masoud Zohrabi; Shahdad Mortaji; Mostafa Sadati; Arash Amirian; Farid Alimoradi; Alireza Rabie; Hossein Shahabi; Behrouz Najafian; Rasoul Dehghani; Peyman Sadeghi; Hojjat Safari; Majid Rahimizadeh | Handball | Men |
| Silver | Ebrahim Barkhordari; Hossein Hosseini; Mohsen Nasr Esfahani | Shooting | Men's 25 m rapid fire pistol team |
| Silver | Zeinab Ramezani | Shooting | Women's 10 m air pistol |
| Silver | Elaheh Ahmadi | Shooting | Women's 10 m air rifle |
| Silver | Peyman Akbari; Amir Hosseini; Mohammad Torkashvand; Alireza Nadi; Mohsen Andalib; Mohammad Mousavi; Hamzeh Zarini; Mojtaba Attar; Mohammad Mohammadkazem; Mehdi Bazargard; Davoud Moghbeli; Mehdi Mahdavi | Volleyball | Men |
| Silver | Ehsan Darabeigi | Weightlifting | Men's 85 kg |
| Silver | Omid Naeij | Weightlifting | Men's 94 kg |
| Silver | Ali Dehghanian | Weightlifting | Men's 105 kg |
| Bronze | Ghaem Mirabian | Aquatics, Diving | Men's 1 m springboard |
| Bronze | Pasha Vahdati | Aquatics, Swimming | Men's 100 m freestyle |
| Bronze | Soheil Maleka Ashtiani | Aquatics, Swimming | Men's 400 m freestyle |
| Bronze | Shahin Baradaran | Aquatics, Swimming | Men's 100 m backstroke |
| Bronze | Omid Mehrabi | Athletics | Men's 5000 m |
| Bronze | Omid Mehrabi | Athletics | Men's 10000 m |
| Bronze | Mohsen Rabbani | Athletics | Men's pole vault |
| Bronze | Alireza Habibi | Athletics | Men's triple jump |
| Bronze | Padideh Bolourizadeh | Athletics | Women's long jump |
| Bronze | Mohammad Rezaei | Fencing | Men's individual épée |
| Bronze | Hassan Roudbarian; Jalal Akbari; Mohsen Arzani; Jalal Hosseini; Sepehr Heidari; Javad Nekounam; Masoud Shojaei; Mohammad Nouri; Andranik Teymourian; Arash Borhani; Reza Enayati; Mohsen Mirabi; Pejman Montazeri; Behshad Yavarzadeh; Khosro Heidari; Omid Ravankhah; Mehrdad Oladi; Saeid Daghighi; Maziar Zare; Vahid Talebloo | Football | Men |
| Bronze | Soroush Pouladian | Gymnastics | Men's individual all-around |
| Bronze | Ali Asghar Marzban | Gymnastics | Men's pommel horse |
| Bronze | Ebrahim Barkhordari; Hossein Hosseini; Mohsen Nasr Esfahani | Shooting | Men's 25 m center fire pistol team |
| Bronze | Nasim Hassanpour | Shooting | Women's 25 m pistol |
| Bronze | Shokoufeh Akasheh; Nasim Hassanpour; Zeinab Ramezani | Shooting | Women's 25 m pistol team |
