= Athletics at the 2005 West Asian Games =

- Venue: Khalifa International Stadium
- Date: 7–9 December 2005

At the 2005 West Asian Games, the athletics events were held at the Khalifa International Stadium in Doha, Qatar. Contested over three days, from 7 to 9 December, it was the first time that women were allowed to compete in athletics events at the Games. A total of 28 events were contested, of which 23 by male and 5 by female athletes. The event was seen as a test event for the Athletics at the 2006 Asian Games, which Doha hosted the following year.

The competition featured some high level performances by a handful of elite athletes: former World Youth champions Belal Mansoor Ali and Yahya Al-Ghahes won the 1500 metres and 100 metres, respectively, while world silver medallist Mubarak Hassan Shami claimed the half marathon title. On the women's side, 2004 Olympian Ruqaya Al-Ghasra won the women's 100 m. In spite of this, many events featured only a small number of athletes and the overall standard of competition was relatively low.

Host nation Qatar topped the medal table with eleven gold medals, ten silver medals and six bronze medal. Their tally was greatly buoyed by the performances of former Kenya distance runners, including event winners Gamal Belal Salem, Majed Saeed Sultan and Musa Amer Obaid. Kuwait had the second highest number of golds with five, while Iran had the second greatest overall haul (13 medals; four golds). Of the nations competing at the games, only Lebanon and Yemen did not win medals in the athletics.

It was later revealed that 3000 metres steeplechase bronze medalist Mohammed Khassaf of Iraq and 200 metres and women's relay gold medallist Munira Saleh failed drugs test at the event and were banned.

== Medalists ==
=== Men ===
Event	Gold		Silver		Bronze	
100 m	Yahya Al-Ghahes; Saudi Arabia	10.39	Saad Al-Shahwani; Qatar	10.53	Al-Waleed Abdulla; Qatar	10.53
200 m	Humoud Al-Saad; Kuwait	21.31	Khalil Al-Hanahneh; Jordan	21.39	Hamed Kefah Al-Dosari; Qatar	21.51
400 m	Fawzi Al-Shammari; Kuwait	47.58	Mohammed Al-Rawahi; Oman	48.32	Ali Shirook; United Arab Emirates	49.14
800 m	Majed Saeed Sultan; Qatar	1:46.86; GR	Belal Mansoor Ali; Bahrain	1:47.07	Abdulrahman Suleiman; Qatar	1:48.22
1500 m	Belal Mansoor Ali; Bahrain	3:40.84; GR	Abubaker Ali Kamal; Qatar	3:41.45	Nasser Shams Kareem; Qatar	3:43.08
5000 m	Essa Ismail Rashed; Qatar	13:33.07; GR	Gamal Belal Salem; Qatar	13:35.12	Omid Mehrabi; Iran	14:39.17
10000 m	Gamal Belal Salem; Qatar	28:40.99; GR	Sultan Khamis Zaman; Qatar	28:44.57	Omid Mehrabi; Iran	31:34.57
110 m hurdles	Bader Al-Buainain; Saudi Arabia	14.14; GR	Rouhollah Asgari; Iran	14.42	None awarded	
400 m hurdles	Mubarak Al-Nubi; Qatar	50.37	Bandar Sharahili; Saudi Arabia	51.96	Mohammed Daak; Saudi Arabia	52.11
3000 m steeplechase	Musa Amer Obaid; Qatar	8:19.46; GR	Thamer Kamal Ali; Qatar	8:33.03	Ali Al-Amri; Saudi Arabia	8:59.44
4×100 m relay	Kuwait; Mohammad Al-Anzi; Humoud Al-Saad; Eisa Al-Youhah; Jarah Al-Khadher	40.48	Oman; Fahad Al-Jabri; Juma Al-Jabri; Musabah Al-Masoudi; Hamoud Al-Dalhami	40.73	Qatar; Abdulla Al-Hamad; Khalid Al-Obaidli; Saad Al-Shahwani; Al-Waleed Abdulla	40.85
4×400 m relay	Qatar; Mubarak Al-Nubi; Yaser Omar El-Haj; Hamed Kefah Al-Dosari; Majed Saeed Sultan	3:09.81	Saudi Arabia; Younes Hawsawi; Mohammed Daak; Mohammed Shaween; Bandar Sharahili	3:14.36	United Arab Emirates; Jasim Al-Junaibi; Khalid Faraj; Saud Abdelkarim; Ali Shirook	3:18.81
Half marathon	Mubarak Hassan Shami; Qatar	1:02:21; GR	Ahmed Jumah Jaber; Qatar	1:03:00	Noori Chkhior; Iraq	1:12:06
20 km walk	Mabrook Saleh Mohamed; Qatar	1:33:04; GR	Waleed Ahmed Al-Sabahy; Qatar	1:34:15	Mohammad Jumaa; Syria	1:35:11
High jump	Mohamed Abbas Darwish; United Arab Emirates	2.16; GR	Jamel Fakhari; Saudi Arabia	2.16	Hashem Al-Oqaibi; Saudi Arabia	2.13
Pole vault	Abdulla Ghanim Saeed; Qatar	5.00; GR	Eshagh Ghaffari; Iran	5.00 =GR	Mohsen Rabbani; Iran	4.80
Long jump	Saleh Al-Haddad; Kuwait	7.50	Ibrahim Mohamedin; Qatar	7.48	Khalil Al-Hanahneh; Jordan	7.37
Triple jump	Mohammad Hazzory; Syria	16.48; GR	Ibrahim Mohamedin; Qatar	16.30	Alireza Habibi; Iran	15.90
Shot put	Bilal Saad Mubarak; Qatar	17.54	Mashari Suroor; Kuwait	17.25	Saeed Al-Yami; Saudi Arabia	16.58
Discus throw	Ehsan Haddadi; Iran	63.63; GR	Rashid Shafi Al-Dosari; Qatar	60.11	Sultan Al-Dawoodi; Saudi Arabia	57.93
Hammer throw	Ali Al-Zenkawi; Kuwait	76.25; GR	Mohammad Al-Jawhar; Kuwait	65.07	Mohamed Faraj Al-Kaabi; Qatar	63.27
Javelin throw	Mohamed Al-Khulaifi; Qatar	71.73; GR	Ayoub Arokhi; Iran	70.29	Firas Al-Mahamid; Syria	69.59
Decathlon	Ali Feizi; Iran	6445	Hadi Sepehrzad; Iran	5660	Saad Al-Bishi; Saudi Arabia	4468

=== Women ===
Event	Gold		Silver		Bronze	
100 m	Ruqaya Al-Ghasra; Bahrain	12.28	Ghofrane Mohammad; Syria	12.33	Dana Hussein; Iraq	12.34
200 m	Ghofrane Mohammad; Syria	24.66; GR	Basma Al-Eshosh; Jordan	25.25	Dana Hussein; Iraq	25.26
4×100 m relay	Iran; Padideh Bolourizadeh; Melani Artoun; Zahra Nabizadeh; Nafiseh Mataei	50.97; GR	Oman; Huda Al-Kharusi; Abeer Al-Jabri; Umaima Al-Hinai; Hanan Al-Harrasi	52.76	Kuwait; Hanan Al-Khamis; Reem Al-Awadhi; Danah Haidar; Danah Al-Nasrallah	1:00:78
High jump	Zahra Nabizadeh; Iran	1.70; GR	Shifa Anabtawi; Jordan	1.35	Rima Taha; Jordan	1.30
Long jump	Rima Taha; Jordan	5.82; GR	Fadwa Al-Bouza; Syria	5.76	Padideh Bolourizadeh; Iran	5.70

== Medal table ==
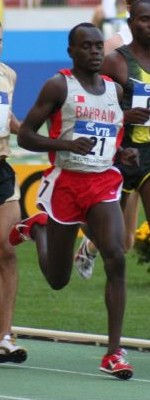
Bahrain's Belal Mansoor Ali won 1500 m gold and 800 m silver medals.

Rank	Nation	Gold	Silver	Bronze	Total
1	Qatar (QAT)	11	10	6	27
2	Kuwait (KUW)	5	2	1	8
3	Iran (IRI)	4	4	5	13
4	Saudi Arabia (KSA)	2	3	6	11
5	Syria (SYR)	2	2	2	6
6	Bahrain (BRN)	2	1	0	3
7	Jordan (JOR)	1	3	2	6
8	United Arab Emirates (UAE)	1	0	2	3
9	Oman (OMA)	0	3	0	3
10	Iraq (IRQ)	0	0	3	3
Totals (10 entries)		28	28	27	83
