= Shooting at the 2005 West Asian Games =

- Venue: Lusail Shooting Range
- Date: 2–6 December 2005

Shooting sports was contested at the 2005 West Asian Games in Doha, Qatar from December 2 to December 6. All competition took place at Al-Duhail Shooting Range.

== Medalists ==
=== Men ===
Event	Gold	Silver	Bronze
10 m air pistol	Hossein Hosseini; Iran	Dhiyaa Abbas; Iraq	Abdulla Al-Naemi; Qatar
10 m air pistol team	Iran; Ebrahim Barkhordari; Hossein Hosseini; Mohsen Nasr Esfahani	Qatar	Saudi Arabia; Saleh Al-Anazi; Ayedh Al-Malki; Hadi Al-Qahtani
25 m standard pistol	Riaz Khan; Qatar	Adel Ahmed Al-Mualla; United Arab Emirates	Zafer Al-Qahtani; Qatar
25 m standard pistol team	Qatar; Salem Al-Marri; Zafer Al-Qahtani; Riaz Khan	Syria	Lebanon
25 m center fire pistol	Mohammad Zein; Syria	Said Al-Hasani; Oman	Salem Al-Marri; Qatar
25 m center fire pistol team	Qatar; Salem Al-Marri; Zafer Al-Qahtani; Riaz Khan	Syria; Fares Abbas; Hadij Hatem; Mohammad Zein	Iran; Ebrahim Barkhordari; Hossein Hosseini; Mohsen Nasr Esfahani
25 m rapid fire pistol	Riaz Khan; Qatar	Zafer Al-Qahtani; Qatar	Said Al-Hasani; Oman
25 m rapid fire pistol team	Qatar; Salem Al-Marri; Zafer Al-Qahtani; Riaz Khan	Iran; Ebrahim Barkhordari; Hossein Hosseini; Mohsen Nasr Esfahani	None awarded
10 m air rifle	Khaled Al-Subaie; Kuwait	Meshal Al-Tahous; Kuwait	Abdulla Al-Ahmad; Qatar
10 m air rifle team	Kuwait; Husain Al-Ajmi; Khaled Al-Subaie; Meshal Al-Tahous	Oman; Jamal Al-Balushi; Khalaf Al-Khatri; Hilal Al-Rashidi	Saudi Arabia; Faiz Al-Anazi; Khalid Al-Anazi; Thunayan Al-Thunayan
10 m running target	Mohammed Abouteama; Qatar	Hassen Abdulla; Qatar	Khalid Al-Kuwari; Qatar
10 m running target team	Qatar; Hassen Abdulla; Mohammed Abouteama; Khalid Al-Kuwari	None awarded	None awarded
Trap	Talih Bou Kamel; Lebanon	Khaled Al-Mudhaf; Kuwait	Naser Al-Meqlad; Kuwait
Trap team	Kuwait; Mohammad Al-Daihani; Naser Al-Meqlad; Khaled Al-Mudhaf	Lebanon; Mohammad Basbous; Talih Bou Kamel; Joe Salem	United Arab Emirates; Sultan Al-Falasi; Ahmed Bin Mejren; Hamad Bin Mejren
Double trap	Saif Al-Shamsi; United Arab Emirates	Hamad Al-Afasi; Kuwait	Saleem Al-Nasri; Oman
Double trap team	United Arab Emirates; Saif Al-Shamsi; Abdullah Bin Mejren; Mohammed Dhahi	Qatar; Rashid Hamad Al-Athba; Hamad Al-Marri; Abdulbaset Mohsin	Kuwait; Hamad Al-Afasi; Fehaid Al-Deehani; Rashed Al-Manee
Skeet	Abdullah Al-Rashidi; Kuwait	Saeed Al-Maktoum; United Arab Emirates	Saud Habib; Kuwait
Skeet team	Kuwait; Zaid Al-Mutairi; Abdullah Al-Rashidi; Saud Habib	United Arab Emirates; Saeed Al-Maktoum; Saif Bin Futtais; Abdullah Dhahi	Syria; Samir Arbaji; Rimon Daraoy; Farid Kharboutly

=== Women ===
Event	Gold	Silver	Bronze
10 m air pistol	Nasim Hassanpour; Iran	Zeinab Ramezani; Iran	Nareman Al-Ajami; United Arab Emirates
10 m air pistol team	Iran; Shokoufeh Akasheh; Nasim Hassanpour; Zeinab Ramezani	United Arab Emirates; Nareman Al-Ajami; Shamma Al-Muhairi; Shaikha Al-Rumaithi	Kuwait; Awatef Al-Qallaf; Dalal Al-Sharhan; Zainab Ismail
25 m pistol	Shamma Al-Muhairi; United Arab Emirates	Aysha Al-Qubaisi; United Arab Emirates	Nasim Hassanpour; Iran
25 m pistol team	United Arab Emirates; Shamma Al-Muhairi; Shaikha Al-Rumaithi; Aysha Al-Qubaisi	Qatar; Souad Al-Khater; Hana Al-Mohammed; Hanadi Salem	Iran; Shokoufeh Akasheh; Nasim Hassanpour; Zeinab Ramezani
10 m air rifle	Raya Zeineddine; Syria	Elaheh Ahmadi; Iran	Adelah Al-Baghli; Kuwait
10 m air rifle team	Kuwait; Batoul Abdullah; Adelah Al-Baghli; Al-Jazi Al-Jaber	Syria; Jehan Al-Magrabi; Weam Soliman; Raya Zeineddine	Qatar

== Medal table ==
Rank	Nation	Gold	Silver	Bronze	Total
1	Qatar (QAT)	7	5	6	18
2	Kuwait (KUW)	6	3	5	14
3	United Arab Emirates (UAE)	4	5	2	11
4	Iran (IRI)	4	3	3	10
5	Syria (SYR)	2	3	1	6
6	Lebanon (LIB)	1	1	1	3
7	Oman (OMA)	0	2	2	4
8	Iraq (IRQ)	0	1	0	1
9	Saudi Arabia (KSA)	0	0	2	2
Totals (9 entries)		24	23	22	69
