= Swimming at the 2005 West Asian Games =

- Venue: Hamad Aquatic Centre
- Date: 2–5 December 2005

The Swimming competition at the 2005 West Asian Games took place December 2–5 at the Hamad Aquatic Centre in Doha, Qatar. It featured 29 events (19 male, 10 female), all conducted in a long course (50m) pool.

== Medalists ==
=== Men ===
Event	Gold		Silver		Bronze	
50 m freestyle	Hamid Reza Mobarrez; Iran	24.06	Khowaiter Al-Dhaheri; United Arab Emirates	24.15	Mohammad Madwa; Kuwait	25.33
100 m freestyle	Mohammad Madwa; Kuwait	53.34	Waleed Al-Qahtani; Kuwait	53.84	Pasha Vahdati; Iran	53.87
200 m freestyle	Soheil Maleka Ashtiani; Iran	1:56.53	Waleed Al-Qahtani; Kuwait	1:56.72	Mohammad Madwa; Kuwait	1:58.23
400 m freestyle	Naeem Al-Masri; Syria	4:06.03	Shared gold		Soheil Maleka Ashtiani; Iran	4:10.19
400 m freestyle	Saleh Mohammad; Syria	4:06.03	Shared gold		Soheil Maleka Ashtiani; Iran	4:10.19
1500 m freestyle	Naeem Al-Masri; Syria	16:18.50	Saleh Mohammad; Syria	16:20.26	Anas Abu Yousuf; Qatar	16:48.84
50 m backstroke	Mansoor Al-Mansoor; Kuwait	28.21	Shahin Baradaran; Iran	28.35	Khowaiter Al-Dhaheri; United Arab Emirates	28.58
100 m backstroke	Mansoor Al-Mansoor; Kuwait	1:00.11	Zainalabdeen Qali; Kuwait	1:01.75	Shahin Baradaran; Iran	1:01.78
200 m backstroke	Souhaib Kalala; Syria	2:12.51	Shahin Baradaran; Iran	2:14.45	Aiman Al-Kulaibi; Oman	2:15.53
50 m breaststroke	Mohammad Alirezaei; Iran	28.99	Ahmed Al-Kudmani; Saudi Arabia	29.62	Firas Chihade; Syria	30.25
100 m breaststroke	Mohammad Alirezaei; Iran	1:05.00	Ahmed Al-Kudmani; Saudi Arabia	1:05.58	Mahmoud Al-Jadan; Syria	1:08.10
200 m breaststroke	Moustafa Al-Saleh; Syria	2:26.07	Ahmed Al-Kudmani; Saudi Arabia	2:26.08	Mahmoud Al-Jadan; Syria	2:26.80
50 m butterfly	Hamid Reza Mobarrez; Iran	25.37	Mansoor Al-Mansoor; Kuwait	25.56	Bader Al-Muhana; Saudi Arabia	25.91
100 m butterfly	Mansoor Al-Mansoor; Kuwait	55.57	Hamid Reza Mobarrez; Iran	56.12	Waleed Al-Qahtani; Kuwait	
200 m butterfly	Mansoor Al-Mansoor; Kuwait	2:04.49	Naeem Al-Masri; Syria	2:08.80	Mahmoud Al-Jadan; Syria	2:09.96
200 m individual medley	Mohammad Al-Naser; Kuwait	2:10.88	Shahin Baradaran; Iran	2:12.06	Waleed Ahmed Hashim; Qatar	2:14.49
400 m individual medley	Naeem Al-Masri; Syria	4:38.73	Mohammad Al-Naser; Kuwait	4:42.02	Mahmoud Al-Jadan; Syria	4:42.97
4 × 100 m freestyle relay	Kuwait; Mansoor Al-Mansoor; Waleed Al-Qahtani; Mohammad Madwa; Mohammad Al-Naser	3:32.50	Iran; Pasha Vahdati; Emin Noshadi; Shahin Baradaran; Soheil Maleka Ashtiani	3:35.39	Syria; Adham Zidan; Firas Chihade; Mahmoud Al-Jadan; Naeem Al-Masri	3:40.34
4 × 200 m freestyle relay	Kuwait; Mansoor Al-Mansoor; Waleed Al-Qahtani; Mohammad Madwa; Zainalabdeen Qali	7:53.77	Iran; Emin Noshadi; Mohammad Bidarian; Shahin Baradaran; Soheil Maleka Ashtiani	7:54.58	Syria; Saleh Mohammad; Adham Zidan; Mahmoud Al-Jadan; Naeem Al-Masri	8:01.40
4 × 100 m medley relay	Iran; Shahin Baradaran; Mohammad Alirezaei; Hamid Reza Mobarrez; Pasha Vahdati	3:55.39	Kuwait; Mansoor Al-Mansoor; Zainalabdeen Qali; Waleed Al-Qahtani; Mohammad Madwa	3:58.31	Syria; Souhaib Kalala; Moustafa Al-Saleh; Mahmoud Al-Jadan; Adham Zidan	4:03.70

=== Women ===
Event	Gold		Silver		Bronze	
50 m freestyle	Mireille Hakimeh; Syria	29.16	Samia Mofti; Syria	29.20	Miriam Hatamleh; Jordan	29.78
100 m freestyle	Miriam Hatamleh; Jordan	1:03.42	Samia Mofti; Syria	1:03.47	Hiba Bashouti; Jordan	1:06.04
50 m backstroke	Mireille Hakimeh; Syria	32.98	Marcelle Mendelek; Lebanon	35.51	Haya Ghul; Jordan	35.89
100 m backstroke	Mireille Hakimeh; Syria	1:11.83	Marcelle Mendelek; Lebanon	1:16.84	Haya Ghul; Jordan	1:18.09
50 m breaststroke	Nibal Yamout; Lebanon	36.93	Salam Barqawi; Jordan	38.14	Rolana Al-Yaghshi; Syria	38.18
100 m breaststroke	Nibal Yamout; Lebanon	1:20.85	Salam Barqawi; Jordan	1:22.27	Rolana Al-Yaghshi; Syria	1:22.64
50 m butterfly	Mireille Hakimeh; Syria	31.64	Miriam Hatamleh; Jordan	31.67	Rolana Al-Yaghshi; Syria	32.14
100 m butterfly	Nivine El-Achi; Lebanon	1:11.92	Miriam Hatamleh; Jordan	1:12.16	Rolana Al-Yaghshi; Syria	1:12.35
4 × 100 m freestyle relay	Syria; Samia Mofti; Diana Al-Zamel; Rolana Al-Yaghshi; Mireille Hakimeh	4:17.36	Jordan; Miriam Hatamleh; Salam Barqawi; Haya Ghul; Hiba Bashouti	4:22.93	Lebanon; Marcelle Mendelek; Nibal Yamout; Nivine El-Achi; Lina Majed	4:37.88
4 × 100 m medley relay	Syria; Mireille Hakimeh; Diana Al-Zamel; Rolana Al-Yaghshi; Samia Mofti	4:58.02	Jordan; Miriam Hatamleh; Salam Barqawi; Haya Ghul; Hiba Bashouti	5:00.51	Lebanon; Marcelle Mendelek; Nibal Yamout; Nivine El-Achi; Lina Majed	5:03.72

== Medal table ==
Rank	Nation	Gold	Silver	Bronze	Total
1	Syria (SYR)	12	4	12	28
2	Kuwait (KUW)	8	6	3	17
3	Iran (IRI)	6	6	3	15
4	Lebanon (LIB)	3	2	2	7
5	Jordan (JOR)	1	6	4	11
6	Saudi Arabia (KSA)	0	3	1	4
7	United Arab Emirates (UAE)	0	1	1	2
8	Qatar (QAT)	0	0	2	2
9	Oman (OMA)	0	0	1	1
Totals (9 entries)		30	28	29	87
