= Weightlifting at the 2005 West Asian Games =

- Venue: Al-Sadd Indoor Hall
- Date: 2–4 December 2005

Weightlifting was contested by men at the 2005 West Asian Games in Doha, Qatar from December 2 to December 4, 2005. All competition took place at the Al-Sadd Indoor Hall.

The host nation Qatar topped the medal table with three gold medals by three naturalized Bulgarian weightlifters.

== Medalists ==
Event	Gold	Silver	Bronze
56 kg	Sajjad Behrouzi; Iran	Zaki Abdallah; Lebanon	Suhail Al-Kulaibi; Oman
62 kg	Ali Al-Dhilab; Saudi Arabia	Hassan Al-Sadah; Saudi Arabia	Salim Abdullah; Iraq
69 kg	Jafar Al-Bagir; Saudi Arabia	Abdulmohsen Al-Bagir; Saudi Arabia	Yousuf Al-Hasni; Oman
77 kg	Harem Taha; Iraq	Hussain Al-Abdullatif; Saudi Arabia	Ahmad Al-Aboudi; Jordan
85 kg	Nader Sufyan Abbas; Qatar	Ehsan Darabeigi; Iran	Mohammed Yosr; Iraq
94 kg	Asghar Ebrahimi; Iran	Omid Naeij; Iran	Najim Al-Radwan; Saudi Arabia
105 kg	Said Saif Asaad; Qatar	Ali Dehghanian; Iran	Ammar Yosr; Iraq
+105 kg	Jaber Saeed Salem; Qatar	Awad Al-Aboudi; Jordan	Haidar Dakhil; Iraq

== Medal table ==
Rank	Nation	Gold	Silver	Bronze	Total
1	Qatar (QAT)	3	0	0	3
2	Saudi Arabia (KSA)	2	3	1	6
3	Iran (IRI)	2	3	0	5
4	Iraq (IRQ)	1	0	4	5
5	Jordan (JOR)	0	1	1	2
6	Lebanon (LIB)	0	1	0	1
7	Oman (OMA)	0	0	2	2
Totals (7 entries)		8	8	8	24
