= Gymnastics at the 2005 West Asian Games =

- Venue: Al-Arabi Indoor Hall
- Date: 2–4 December 2005

Artistic gymnastics was contested at the 2005 West Asian Games in Doha, Qatar from December 2 to December 4. All events took place at Al-Arabi Indoor Hall.

== Medalists ==
Event	Gold	Silver	Bronze
Team	Syria; Saeed Al-Doumale; Louay Al-Heraki; Sowhel Al-Kowrdi; Amer Attar; Fadi Bahlawan; Mohammad Daher	Iran; Ali Azizi; Hamid Reza Babaei; Kambiz Hajmohammadi; Nader Hanifi; Ali Asghar Marzban; Soroush Pouladian	Jordan; Tariq Abu Ayad; Mohammad Abu Saleh; Ali Al-Asi; Jad Mazahreh
Individual all-around	Fadi Bahlawan; Syria	Sowhel Al-Kowrdi; Syria	Soroush Pouladian; Iran
Floor	Nashwan Al-Harazi; Yemen	Fadi Bahlawan; Syria	Maki Al-Mubiareek; Saudi Arabia
Pommel horse	Nashwan Al-Harazi; Yemen	Kambiz Hajmohammadi; Iran	Ali Asghar Marzban; Iran
Rings	Sowhel Al-Kowrdi; Syria	Fadi Bahlawan; Syria	Ali Al-Asi; Jordan
Vault	Ali Al-Asi; Jordan	Nashwan Al-Harazi; Yemen	Maki Al-Mubiareek; Saudi Arabia
Parallel bars	Sowhel Al-Kowrdi; Syria	Hamid Reza Babaei; Iran	Mohammad Abu Saleh; Jordan
Horizontal bar	Fahad Al-Ghannam; Kuwait	Jad Mazahreh; Jordan	Fadi Bahlawan; Syria

== Medal table ==
Rank	Nation	Gold	Silver	Bronze	Total
1	Syria (SYR)	4	3	1	8
2	Yemen (YEM)	2	1	0	3
3	Jordan (JOR)	1	1	3	5
4	Kuwait (KUW)	1	0	0	1
5	Iran (IRI)	0	3	2	5
6	Saudi Arabia (KSA)	0	0	2	2
Totals (6 entries)		8	8	8	24
