= Bowling at the 2005 West Asian Games =

Sporting event in Qatar

- Venue: Qatar Bowling Center
- Date: 4–9 December 2005

Bowling took place for the men's and women's individual, doubles, trios, and team events at the 2005 West Asian Games in Doha, Qatar from December 4 to December 9. All events were held at the Qatar Bowling Center.

== Medalists ==
=== Men ===
Event	Gold	Silver	Bronze
Singles	Saeed Al-Hajri; Qatar	Mahmood Al-Attar; United Arab Emirates	Abdulla Al-Qattan; Qatar
Doubles	Kuwait; Rakan Al-Ameeri; Khaled Al-Debayyan	Kuwait; Fadhel Al-Mousawi; Mohammad Al-Regeebah	United Arab Emirates; Nayef Eqab; Shaker Ali Al-Hassan
Trios	Qatar; Bandar Al-Shafi; Mubarak Al-Merikhi; Saeed Al-Hajri	Kuwait; Fadhel Al-Mousawi; Khaled Al-Debayyan; Mohammad Al-Regeebah	Qatar; Ahmed Shahin Al-Merikhi; Abdulla Al-Qattan; Khalifa Al-Kubaisi
Team of 5	Qatar; Ahmed Shahin Al-Merikhi; Abdulla Al-Qattan; Mubarak Al-Merikhi; Bandar Al-Shafi; Saeed Al-Hajri; Khalifa Al-Kubaisi	United Arab Emirates; Sayed Ibrahim Al-Hashemi; Hussain Nasir Al-Suwaidi; Sultan Al-Marzouqi; Shaker Ali Al-Hassan; Nayef Eqab; Mahmood Al-Attar	Kuwait; Fadhel Al-Mousawi; Rakan Al-Ameeri; Basel Al-Anzi; Mohammad Al-Regeebah; Khaled Al-Debayyan; Hussain Mohammad
All-events	Bandar Al-Shafi; Qatar	Saeed Al-Hajri; Qatar	Khaled Al-Debayyan; Kuwait
Masters	Nayef Eqab; United Arab Emirates	Mubarak Al-Merikhi; Qatar	Bandar Al-Shafi; Qatar

=== Women ===
Event	Gold	Silver	Bronze
Singles	Nadia Al-Awadhi; Bahrain	Hind Al-Hammadi; United Arab Emirates	Nora Al-Roudan; Kuwait
Doubles	United Arab Emirates; Rahma Mubarak Al-Sharqi; Hind Al-Hammadi	Bahrain; Nadia Al-Awadhi; Marjan Habib	Bahrain; Mariam Habib; Noora Majed Sultan

== Medal table ==
Rank	Nation	Gold	Silver	Bronze	Total
1	Qatar (QAT)	4	2	3	9
2	United Arab Emirates (UAE)	2	3	1	6
3	Kuwait (KUW)	1	2	3	6
4	Bahrain (BRN)	1	1	1	3
Totals (4 entries)		8	8	8	24
