= Diving at the 2005 West Asian Games =

2005 diving competition in Doha, Qatar

- Venue: Hamad Aquatic Centre
- Date: 5–7 December 2005

Diving was contested at the 2005 West Asian Games in Doha, Qatar from December 5 to December 7. Men's individual and synchronized events were held. All competition took place at the Hamad Aquatic Centre.

Iran and Kuwait won two gold medals each.

== Medalists ==
Event	Gold	Silver	Bronze
1 m springboard	Mubarak Al-Nuaimi; Qatar	Hussein Al-Qallaf; Kuwait	Ghaem Mirabian; Iran
3 m springboard	Hussein Al-Qallaf; Kuwait	Ghaem Mirabian; Iran	Bader Al-Ruwaished; Kuwait
10 m platform	Saeid Taghbostani; Iran	Mubarak Al-Nuaimi; Qatar	Mohammed Shewaiter; Qatar
Synchronized 3 m springboard	Kuwait; Bader Al-Ruwaished; Hussein Al-Qallaf	Iran; Ghaem Mirabian; Saeid Taghbostani	Qatar; Mubarak Al-Nuaimi; Abdulla Safar
Synchronized 10 m platform	Iran; Ghaem Mirabian; Saeid Taghbostani	Qatar; Mohammed Shewaiter; Mubarak Al-Nuaimi	Kuwait; Bader Al-Ruwaished; Hussein Al-Qallaf

== Medal table ==
Rank	Nation	Gold	Silver	Bronze	Total
1	Iran (IRI)	2	2	1	5
2	Kuwait (KUW)	2	1	2	5
3	Qatar (QAT)	1	2	2	5
Totals (3 entries)		5	5	5	15
