= Fencing at the 2005 West Asian Games =

- Venue: Al-Arabi Indoor Hall
- Date: 7–9 December 2005

Fencing was contested at the 2005 West Asian Games in Doha, Qatar from December 7 to December 9. All competition took place at Al-Arabi Indoor Hall.

== Medalists ==
Event	Gold	Silver	Bronze
Épée	Ali Yaghoubian; Iran	Hamad Al-Awadhi; Kuwait	Mohammad Rezaei; Iran
Épée	Ali Yaghoubian; Iran	Hamad Al-Awadhi; Kuwait	Mohammad Al-Ajmi; Kuwait
Foil	Abdulmohsen Shahrayen; Kuwait	Javad Rezaei; Iran	Amir Shabakehsaz; Qatar
Foil	Abdulmohsen Shahrayen; Kuwait	Javad Rezaei; Iran	Ali Khasrouh; Kuwait
Sabre	Mojtaba Abedini; Iran	Peyman Fakhri; Iran	Mohammad Kazem; Kuwait
Sabre	Mojtaba Abedini; Iran	Peyman Fakhri; Iran	Mohammad Malallah; Kuwait

== Medal table ==
Rank	Nation	Gold	Silver	Bronze	Total
1	Iran (IRI)	2	2	1	5
2	Kuwait (KUW)	1	1	4	6
3	Qatar (QAT)	0	0	1	1
Totals (3 entries)		3	3	6	12
