= 2010 Asian Men's Handball Championship =

2010 Asian Championship

Tournament details
- Host country: Lebanon
- Venue: 1 (in 1 host city)
- Dates: 6–19 February
- Teams: 12 (from 1 confederation)

Final positions
- Champions: South Korea (8th title)
- Runners-up: Bahrain
- Third place: Japan
- Fourth place: Saudi Arabia

Tournament statistics
- Matches played: 34
- Goals scored: 1,867 (54.91 per match)

The 2010 Asian Men's Handball Championship was the 14th edition of the Asian Men's Handball Championship, held in Beirut, Lebanon, from 6 to 19 February 2010. It acted as the Asian qualifying tournament for the 2011 World Men's Handball Championship in Sweden.

== Draw ==
Group A	Group B	Group C	Group D
Saudi Arabia; China; Syria; Iraq *	~~Kuwait~~ * Japan; Bahrain	South Korea; Qatar; United Arab Emirates	Lebanon; Iran; Jordan

* Following the IOC decision to suspend the National Olympic Committee of Kuwait which came in force on 1 January 2010, the International Handball Federation decided to suspend handball in Kuwait in all categories. Following this decision Iraq replaced Kuwait in Group B to balance the number of teams in each group.

== Preliminary round ==
All times are local (UTC+2).

=== Group A ===
Team	Pld	W	D	L	GF	GA	GD	Pts
Syria	2	1	0	1	50	44	+6	2
Saudi Arabia	2	1	0	1	43	44	−1	2
China	2	1	0	1	43	48	−5	2

6 February 2010; 14:00	Saudi Arabia	23–22	Syria	Hatem Achour Hall, Beirut; Referees: Ikebuchi, Hizaki (JPN)
6 February 2010; 14:00	Al-Salem 8	(14–9)	Al-Karad 6	Hatem Achour Hall, Beirut; Referees: Ikebuchi, Hizaki (JPN)

8 February 2010; 16:00	Syria	28–21	China	Hatem Achour Hall, Beirut; Referees: Al-Marzouqi, Al-Nuaimi (UAE)
8 February 2010; 16:00	Hadad 10	(14–9)		Hatem Achour Hall, Beirut; Referees: Al-Marzouqi, Al-Nuaimi (UAE)

10 February 2010; 17:30	Saudi Arabia	20–22	China	Hatem Achour Hall, Beirut; Referees: Dib, Haidar (LIB)
10 February 2010; 17:30	Al-Habib 5	(11–10)	Shen Z. 7	Hatem Achour Hall, Beirut; Referees: Dib, Haidar (LIB)

=== Group B ===
Team	Pld	W	D	L	GF	GA	GD	Pts
Japan	2	2	0	0	66	48	+18	4
Bahrain	2	1	0	1	57	50	+7	2
Iraq	2	0	0	2	40	65	−25	0

7 February 2010; 16:00	Japan	35–21	Iraq	Hatem Achour Hall, Beirut; Referees: Dib, Haidar (LIB)
7 February 2010; 16:00	Miyazaki 9	(19–13)	Khanjar 6	Hatem Achour Hall, Beirut; Referees: Dib, Haidar (LIB)

9 February 2010; 16:00	Iraq	19–30	Bahrain	Hatem Achour Hall, Beirut; Referees: Kim, Kim (KOR)
9 February 2010; 16:00	Mondher 6	(7–17)	Jawher, H. Madan 5	Hatem Achour Hall, Beirut; Referees: Kim, Kim (KOR)

11 February 2010; 16:00	Japan	31–27	Bahrain	Hatem Achour Hall, Beirut; Referees: Al-Marzouqi, Al-Nuaimi (UAE)
11 February 2010; 16:00	Miyazaki 7	(16–12)	M. Ali 7	Hatem Achour Hall, Beirut; Referees: Al-Marzouqi, Al-Nuaimi (UAE)

=== Group C ===
Team	Pld	W	D	L	GF	GA	GD	Pts
South Korea	2	2	0	0	59	46	+13	4
Qatar	2	0	1	1	48	54	−6	1
United Arab Emirates	2	0	1	1	48	55	−7	1

7 February 2010; 17:30	South Korea	30–23	United Arab Emirates	Hatem Achour Hall, Beirut; Referees: Krstić, Ljubić (SLO)
7 February 2010; 17:30	Park J.G. 7	(13–10)	W. Al-Balooshi 7	Hatem Achour Hall, Beirut; Referees: Krstić, Ljubić (SLO)

9 February 2010; 17:30	United Arab Emirates	25–25	Qatar	Hatem Achour Hall, Beirut; Referees: Kolahdouzan, Karbaschi (IRI)
9 February 2010; 17:30	Al-Bannai 6	(12–12)	Al-Rayes 5	Hatem Achour Hall, Beirut; Referees: Kolahdouzan, Karbaschi (IRI)

11 February 2010; 17:30	South Korea	29–23	Qatar	Hatem Achour Hall, Beirut; Referees: Krstić, Ljubić (SLO)
11 February 2010; 17:30	Jeong Y.K., Jung S.Y., Lee J.W. 4	(16–8)	Al-Rayes, Ghazal 5	Hatem Achour Hall, Beirut; Referees: Krstić, Ljubić (SLO)

=== Group D ===
Team	Pld	W	D	L	GF	GA	GD	Pts
Iran	2	2	0	0	63	39	+24	4
Lebanon (H)	2	1	0	1	50	46	+4	2
Jordan	2	0	0	2	44	72	−28	0

(H) Hosts

6 February 2010; 17:00	Jordan	21–34	Lebanon	Hatem Achour Hall, Beirut; Referees: Kim, Kim (KOR)
6 February 2010; 17:00		(7–15)	Badra 8	Hatem Achour Hall, Beirut; Referees: Kim, Kim (KOR)

8 February 2010; 17:30	Iran	38–23	Jordan	Hatem Achour Hall, Beirut; Referees: Gang, Wang (CHN)
8 February 2010; 17:30	Masaeli 10	(19–12)		Hatem Achour Hall, Beirut; Referees: Gang, Wang (CHN)

10 February 2010; 16:00	Iran	25–16	Lebanon	Hatem Achour Hall, Beirut; Referees: Al-Suwaidi, Ba-Matraf (QAT)
10 February 2010; 16:00	Masaeli 9	(11–5)	Dokić 5	Hatem Achour Hall, Beirut; Referees: Al-Suwaidi, Ba-Matraf (QAT)

== Placement 9th–12th ==
Semifinals
14 February – Beirut
China	28
United Arab Emirates	25
15 February – Beirut
Iraq	30
Jordan	26

9th/10th
16 February – Beirut
China	30
Iraq	25
11th/12th
16 February – Beirut
United Arab Emirates	43
Jordan	36

=== 9th–12th semifinals ===
14 February 2010; 12:00	China	28–25	United Arab Emirates	Hatem Achour Hall, Beirut; Referees: Al-Watani, Qamber (BHR)
14 February 2010; 12:00	Shen Z. 10	(15–14)	Zeyoudi 5	Hatem Achour Hall, Beirut; Referees: Al-Watani, Qamber (BHR)

15 February 2010; 12:00	Iraq	30–26	Jordan	Hatem Achour Hall, Beirut; Referees: Kim, Kim (KOR)
15 February 2010; 12:00		(12–8)		Hatem Achour Hall, Beirut; Referees: Kim, Kim (KOR)

=== 11th/12th ===
16 February 2010; 16:00	United Arab Emirates	43–36	Jordan	Hatem Achour Hall, Beirut; Referees: Al-Suwaidi, Ba-Matraf (QAT)
16 February 2010; 16:00	Al-Mansoori 8	(20–15)	Al-Hendawi 10	Hatem Achour Hall, Beirut; Referees: Al-Suwaidi, Ba-Matraf (QAT)

=== 9th/10th ===
16 February 2010; 18:00	China	30–25	Iraq	Hatem Achour Hall, Beirut; Referees: Al-Watani, Qamber (BHR)
16 February 2010; 18:00		(12–11)		Hatem Achour Hall, Beirut; Referees: Al-Watani, Qamber (BHR)

== Main round ==
=== Group E ===
Team	Pld	W	D	L	GF	GA	GD	Pts
Saudi Arabia	3	2	1	0	80	71	+9	5
Japan	3	2	0	1	91	71	+20	4
Qatar	3	1	1	1	68	76	−8	3
Iran	3	0	0	3	63	84	−21	0

13 February 2010; 18:00	Iran	19–26	Saudi Arabia	Hatem Achour Hall, Beirut; Referees: Al-Watani, Qamber (BHR)
13 February 2010; 18:00	Masaeli 5	(8–11)	Al-Habib 8	Hatem Achour Hall, Beirut; Referees: Al-Watani, Qamber (BHR)

13 February 2010; 20:00	Japan	29–20	Qatar	Hatem Achour Hall, Beirut; Referees: Al-Marzouqi, Al-Nuaimi (UAE)
13 February 2010; 20:00	Miyazaki, Suematsu 7	(15–10)	Al-Habeeb 4	Hatem Achour Hall, Beirut; Referees: Al-Marzouqi, Al-Nuaimi (UAE)

14 February 2010; 18:00	Iran	21–22	Qatar	Hatem Achour Hall, Beirut; Referees: Krstić, Ljubić (SLO)
14 February 2010; 18:00	Masaeli 7	(11–11)	Abdullah 7	Hatem Achour Hall, Beirut; Referees: Krstić, Ljubić (SLO)

14 February 2010; 20:00	Japan	26–28	Saudi Arabia	Hatem Achour Hall, Beirut; Referees: Dib, Haidar (LIB)
14 February 2010; 20:00	Toyoda 8	(12–15)	Al-Harbi 10	Hatem Achour Hall, Beirut; Referees: Dib, Haidar (LIB)

15 February 2010; 18:00	Qatar	26–26	Saudi Arabia	Hatem Achour Hall, Beirut; Referees: Krstić, Ljubić (SLO)
15 February 2010; 18:00		(12–13)	Al-Harbi 8	Hatem Achour Hall, Beirut; Referees: Krstić, Ljubić (SLO)

15 February 2010; 20:00	Japan	36–23	Iran	Hatem Achour Hall, Beirut; Referees: Gang, Wang (CHN)
15 February 2010; 20:00	Miyazaki 5	(21–11)	Zohrabi 5	Hatem Achour Hall, Beirut; Referees: Gang, Wang (CHN)

=== Group F ===
Team	Pld	W	D	L	GF	GA	GD	Pts
South Korea	3	3	0	0	112	74	+38	6
Bahrain	3	2	0	1	97	89	+8	4
Syria	3	1	0	2	89	99	−10	2
Lebanon (H)	3	0	0	3	70	106	−36	0

(H) Hosts

13 February 2010; 14:00	Syria	32–35	Bahrain	Hatem Achour Hall, Beirut; Referees: Krstić, Ljubić (SLO)
13 February 2010; 14:00	Hadad 10	(13–16)	J. Abdulqader 13	Hatem Achour Hall, Beirut; Referees: Krstić, Ljubić (SLO)

13 February 2010; 16:00	South Korea	38–23	Lebanon	Hatem Achour Hall, Beirut; Referees: Ikebuchi, Hizaki (JPN)
13 February 2010; 16:00	Yu D.G., Paek W.C., Lee J.W. 6	(17–11)	Al-Nahass 7	Hatem Achour Hall, Beirut; Referees: Ikebuchi, Hizaki (JPN)

14 February 2010; 14:00	South Korea	39–26	Bahrain	Hatem Achour Hall, Beirut; Referees: Gang, Wang (CHN)
14 February 2010; 14:00	Jung S.Y. 7	(19–11)	J. Abdulqader 5	Hatem Achour Hall, Beirut; Referees: Gang, Wang (CHN)

14 February 2010; 16:00	Syria	32–29	Lebanon	Hatem Achour Hall, Beirut; Referees: Kolahdouzan, Karbaschi (IRI)
14 February 2010; 16:00	Al-Karad 11	(17–14)	Dokić 7	Hatem Achour Hall, Beirut; Referees: Kolahdouzan, Karbaschi (IRI)

15 February 2010; 14:00	Syria	25–35	South Korea	Hatem Achour Hall, Beirut; Referees: Ikebuchi, Hizaki (JPN)
15 February 2010; 14:00	Al-Karad 7	(14–15)	Park J.G. 6	Hatem Achour Hall, Beirut; Referees: Ikebuchi, Hizaki (JPN)

15 February 2010; 16:00	Lebanon	18–36	Bahrain	Hatem Achour Hall, Beirut; Referees: Al-Suwaidi, Ba-Matraf (QAT)
15 February 2010; 16:00	Badra 4	(8–13)	J. Abdulqader 9	Hatem Achour Hall, Beirut; Referees: Al-Suwaidi, Ba-Matraf (QAT)

== Placement 5th–8th ==
=== 7th/8th ===
17 February 2010; 14:00	Iran	35–23	Lebanon	Hatem Achour Hall, Beirut; Referees: Ikebuchi, Hizaki (JPN)
17 February 2010; 14:00	S. Esteki 17	(14–13)	Badra, Chahine 4	Hatem Achour Hall, Beirut; Referees: Ikebuchi, Hizaki (JPN)

=== 5th/6th ===
17 February 2010; 16:00	Qatar	31–30	Syria	Hatem Achour Hall, Beirut; Referees: Dib, Haidar (LIB)
17 February 2010; 16:00		(15–16)		Hatem Achour Hall, Beirut; Referees: Dib, Haidar (LIB)

== Final round ==
Semifinals
17 February – Beirut
Saudi Arabia	25
Bahrain	26
17 February – Beirut
South Korea	30
Japan	23

Gold medal match
19 February – Beirut
Bahrain	25
South Korea	32
Bronze medal match
19 February – Beirut
Saudi Arabia	30
Japan (ET)	33

=== Semifinals ===
17 February 2010; 18:00	Saudi Arabia	25–26	Bahrain	Hatem Achour Hall, Beirut; Referees: Al-Marzouqi, Al-Nuaimi (UAE)
17 February 2010; 18:00	Al-Harbi, Al-Habib 6	(12–14)	Jawher 7	Hatem Achour Hall, Beirut; Referees: Al-Marzouqi, Al-Nuaimi (UAE)

17 February 2010; 20:00	South Korea	30–23	Japan	Hatem Achour Hall, Beirut; Referees: Gang, Wang (CHN)
17 February 2010; 20:00	Yoon K.S. 7	(14–12)	Toyoda 6	Hatem Achour Hall, Beirut; Referees: Gang, Wang (CHN)

=== Bronze medal match ===
19 February 2010
16:00
Saudi Arabia
30–33 (ET)
Japan
Hatem Achour Hall, Beirut
Referees: Krstić, Ljubić (SLO)
Al-Harbi 11
(12–14)
Miyazaki 12

FT: 27–27 ET: 3–6

=== Gold medal match ===
19 February 2010; 18:00	Bahrain	25–32	South Korea	Hatem Achour Hall, Beirut; Referees: Kolahdouzan, Karbaschi (IRI)
19 February 2010; 18:00	M. Abdulqader 6	(13–16)	Lee T.Y. 12	Hatem Achour Hall, Beirut; Referees: Kolahdouzan, Karbaschi (IRI)

== Final standing ==
Rank	Team
1st place, gold medalist(s)	South Korea
2nd place, silver medalist(s)	Bahrain
3rd place, bronze medalist(s)	Japan
4	Saudi Arabia
5	Qatar
6	Syria
7	Iran
8	Lebanon
9	China
10	Iraq
11	United Arab Emirates
12	Jordan

Team qualified for the 2011 World Championship
