= Raya Zeineddine =

Syrian sports shooter

Raya Zin Aldden
Personal information
- Born: 8 March 1988 (age 38) Swaida, Syria
- Height: 1.76 m (5 ft 9 in)
- Weight: 65 kg (143 lb)

Sport
- Country: Syria
- Sport: Sports shooting
- Event: AR40 (10m air rifle)
- Club: As-Suwayda Shooting Club
Medal record
Women's shooting
Representing Syria
West Asian Games
Gold medal – first place	2005 Doha	AR40
Silver medal – second place	2005 Doha	AR40 team

Raya Zin Aldden (Arabic: راية زين الدين; born 8 March 1988), also known as Raya Zeineddine, is a Syrian sports shooter. She competed in the Women's 10 metre air rifle event at the 2012 Summer Olympics.
