= Kang Jae-won =

South Korean handball player (born 1965)

Kang Jae-Won
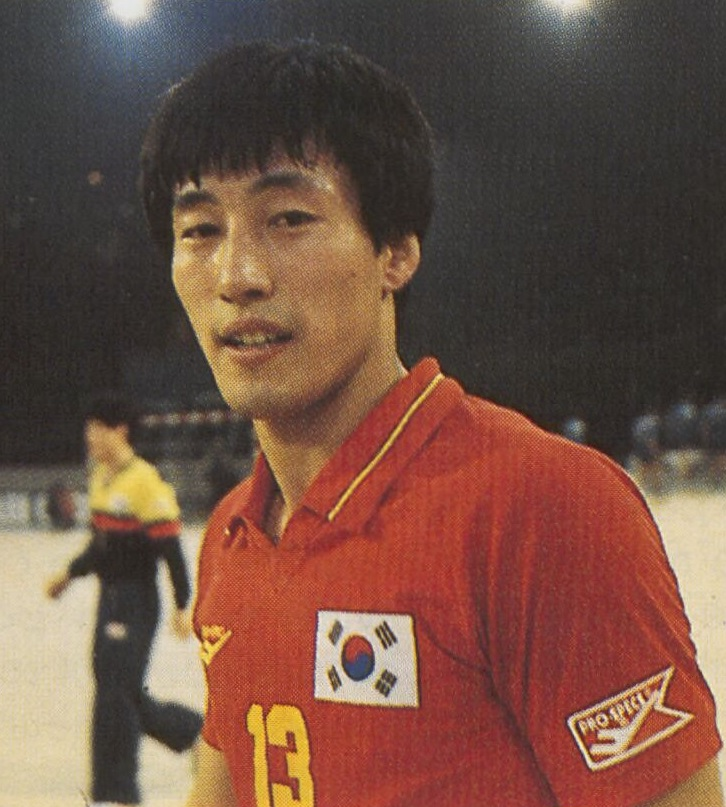
- Kang Jae-won in 1988

Personal information
- Nationality: South Korean
- Born: 30 November 1965 (age 60) Bucheon, South Korea
- Height: 1.83 m (6 ft 0 in)

Sport
- Sport: Handball
- Position: Right back Centre back
- Current club: South Korea

Senior clubs
- Years: Team
- –1989: Bucheon THS (Korea)
- 1989–1992: Grasshopper
- 1992–2002: Pfadi Winterthur
National team
- Years: Team
- 1982–1992: South Korea

Teams managed
- 2000–2002: Pfadi Winterthur
- 2005–2007: Daido Steel
- 2007–2008: China (W)
- 2010–2015: South Korea (W)
- 2017–2021: South Korea (W)
Medal record
Olympic Games
Silver medal – second place	1988 Seoul	Team
Asian Games
Gold medal – first place	1986 Seoul	Team
Gold medal – first place	1990 Beijing	Team
Bronze medal – third place	1982 New Delhi	Team
Asian Championship
Gold medal – first place	1983 South Korea
Gold medal – first place	1987 Jordan
Gold medal – first place	1989 China
Gold medal – first place	1991 Japan

- Kang Jae-won
- Hangul: 강재원
- Hanja: 姜在源
- RR: Gang Jaewon
- MR: Kang Chaewŏn

Kang Jae-Won (born 30 November 1965) is a South Korean retired handball player and coach. Until 2021 he was the coach of South Korean women's national team.

He was voted World Player of the Year 1989 by the International Handball Federation.

Kang achieved a silver medal with the South Korean national team at the 1988 Summer Olympics in Seoul.

== Career ==
Kang moved to Europe to join Swiss team Grasshopper Club Zürich in 1990. Two years later he joined rivals Pfadi Winterthur. From 2000 to 2002 he was the player-coach of the team. During his time at the club, he won the Swiss league 6 times and the Swiss Cup once.

In 2005 he became the coach of Japanese team Daido Steel.

In 2007 he became the head coach of the Chinese women's national team. He coached the team at the 2008 Olympics at home ground, where China went out in the quarterfinals to South Korea.

From November 2010 to 2021 he coached the South Korean women's national team.

== Honours ==
=== Grasshopper ===
- Swiss League – 1990, 1991

=== Pfadi Winterthur ===
- Swiss League – 1994, 1995, 1996, 1997, 1998, 2002
- SHV-Cup – 1998

=== Individual ===
- IHF World Player of the Year – 1989
- Six-time MVP of Swiss Bundesliga

=== Pfadi Winterthur ===
- Swiss League – 2002
- EHF Challenge Cup runner-up – 2001
