= Nashwan Al-Harazi =

Yemeni artistic gymnast

- Full name: Nashwan Haidar Al-Harazi
- Born: January 1, 1987 (age 39)

Gymnastics career
- Discipline: Men's artistic gymnastics
- Country represented: Yemen; (2002-2011 (?))
Medal record
Men's artistic gymnastics
Representing Yemen
Asian Gymnastics Championships
Bronze medal – third place	2003 Guangzhou	Floor exercise
Bronze medal – third place	2003 Guangzhou	Vault
Pan Arab Games
Silver medal – second place	2011 Doha	Pommel horse
Bronze medal – third place	2011 Doha	Floor exercise
West Asian Games
Gold medal – first place	2005 Doha	Floor exercise
Gold medal – first place	2005 Doha	Pommel horse
Silver medal – second place	2005 Doha	Vault

Nashwan Haidar Al-Harazi (born 1 January 1987 in Sana'a) is a Yemeni gymnast. He was the first Yemeni gymnast to compete in the Olympics, at the 2008 Games in Beijing.
