= Ebrahim Barkhordari =

Iranian sport shooter (born 1982)

Personal information
- Born: 14 September 1982 (age 43) Qazvin, Iran

Sport
- Sport: Sports shooting
Medal record
Representing Iran
Men's shooting
Asian Airgun Championships
Silver medal – second place	2013 Tehran	Air Pistol team
Bronze medal – third place	2009 Doha	Air Pistol team
Bronze medal – third place	2013 Tehran	Air Pistol
West Asian Games
Gold medal – first place	2005 Doha	Air Pistol team
Silver medal – second place	2005 Doha	Rapid Fire Pistol team
Bronze medal – third place	2005 Doha	Center Fire Pistol team

Ebrahim Barkhordari (Persian: ابراهیم برخورداری, born September 14, 1982, in Qazvin) is an Iranian sport shooter who competes in the men's 10 metre air pistol and 50 metre pistol events. At the 2012 Summer Olympics, he finished 33rd in the qualifying round for the 10 metre air pistol, failing to make the cut for the final. He also failed to make the final in the 50 metre pistol.
