= Mohammad Alirezaei =

Iranian swimmer

Personal information
- Full name: Mohammad Alirezaei Dizicheh
- Nationality: Iranian
- Born: July 27, 1985 (age 41) Esfahan, Iran
- Height: 1.93 m (6 ft 4 in)
- Weight: 168 lb (76 kg)

Sport
- Sport: Swimming
Medal record
Representing Iran
Men's swimming
Asian Indoor Games
Gold medal – first place	2007 Macau	50 m breaststroke
Bronze medal – third place	2009 Hanoi	4×50 m medley relay
West Asian Games
Gold medal – first place	2005 Doha	50 m breaststroke
Gold medal – first place	2005 Doha	100 m breaststroke
Gold medal – first place	2005 Doha	4×100 m medley relay

Mohammad Alirezaei Dizicheh (Persian: محمد علیرضایی دیزیچه, born 27 July 1985 in Esfahan) is an Iranian former breaststroke swimmer.

Alirezaei became the first Iranian ever to qualify for an Olympic swimming event without using wildcard, when he qualified for the 2008 Summer Olympics. However, he withdrew from the race minutes before he was scheduled to compete against an Israeli. According to team officials, Alirezaei fell ill before the qualifiers for the men's 100 meter breaststroke, and was taken to a hospital in Beijing.

Several other media reports stated Alirezaei had been ordered by Iranian authorities to withdraw from the competition, to avoid swimming against Israeli Olympic swimmer Tom Be'eri. Olympic Committee of Israel General Secretary Efraim Zinger said:

"This isn't the first time this has happened and it doesn't surprise me anymore. Politics takes precedence over sport with the Iranians and the Olympic spirit is as far from them as east is far from west. My heart goes out to the Iranian athletes... There's no place for this kind of behavior in the Olympic movement and it's a shame it continues."

The Iranian president was quoted by the state news agency as saying that Alirezaei's actions would be "recorded in the history of Iranian glories," and he declared that Iran consider Alirezaei to be "the champion of the 2004 Olympic Games." But Giselle Davies, director of communications for the International Olympic Committee, stated that Alirezaei had confirmed in writing that he withdrew from the men's 100 metre breaststroke because of illness, and that the committee would take Alirezaei at his word. Iran could have faced sanctions had the IOC decided that Alirezaei pulled out of the race because an Israeli was scheduled to compete. Giselle Davies, director of communications for the IOC, said that Alirezaei withdrew because of sickness and submitted his case in writing to his Federation. Davies stated: "We take both the athlete and the [Iranian] National Olympic Committee at their word on this." Flip Bondy wrote in the New York Daily News: "This is ... worthy of expulsion from the Olympic movement. Yet such an action would create a precarious schism, so the IOC once again has cynically agreed to believe the Iranians' medical excuse for Alirezaei... Instead, the IOC shamelessly shifted into ingenuous mode."

Alirezaei also withdrew from the 2009 Swimming World Championship in Rome, refusing to race in the same heat in the men's 50-meter breaststrokeas Israeli Mickey Malul.

Alirezaei also withdrew from the 100 metre breaststroke at the 2011 World Aquatics Championships after he was put in the same heat with Israeli Olympic swimmer Gal Nevo. He was the only swimmer in the 83-man field who did not start. Fédération internationale de natation's executive director, Cornel Marculescu, said FINA was looking into the situation, but added: "If this is the case there's no point in [Iran] coming to the world championships. We don't need these politics in our sport." Yitzhak Kramer, the head of the Israeli delegation, said he was used to such behavior, but: "If someone wants to behave like a child we don't care." Alirezaei's withdrawal was compared to a similar incident at the 2004 Athens Games involving Iranian Judo champion Arash Miresmaeili.

== See also ==
- Boycotts of Israel in individual sports
