= Nasim Hassanpour =

Iranian sport shooter

Personal information
- Full name: Nasim Hassanpour
- Nationality: Iran
- Born: 25 August 1984 (age 41) Tabriz, Iran
- Height: 1.60 m (5 ft 3 in)
- Weight: 53 kg (117 lb)

Sport
- Sport: Shooting
- Event(s): 10 m air pistol (AP40); 25 m pistol (SP)
- Club: Azadi
- Coached by: Javad Kuhpayezadeh
Medal record
Women's shooting
Representing Iran
Asian Airgun Championships
Bronze medal – third place	2011 Kuwait City	10m Air Pistol team
West Asian Games
Gold medal – first place	2005 Doha	10m Air Pistol
Gold medal – first place	2005 Doha	10m Air Pistol team
Bronze medal – third place	2005 Doha	25m Pistol
Bronze medal – third place	2005 Doha	25m Pistol team

Nasim Hassanpour (Persian: نسیم حسن پور; born 25 August 1984 in Tabriz, East Azerbaijan) is an Iranian sport shooter. She has been selected to compete for Iran at the 2004 Summer Olympics, and has won a bronze under junior division in air pistol shooting at the Asian Championships in Kuala Lumpur, Malaysia on that same year. Hassanpour also trains under her personal coach Javad Kuhpayezadeh for the national team, while shooting at Azadi Stadium's pistol range in Tehran.

Hassanpour qualified as the only female shooter for the Iranian squad in the 10 m air pistol at the 2004 Summer Olympics in Athens. She had been granted an Olympic invitation for her country by ISSF, having registered a minimum qualifying score of 375 from her third-place finish at the Asian Championships few months earlier. Hassanpour fired a steady 376 out of a possible 400 to force in a two-way tie with Australia's two-time Olympian Linda Ryan for twenty-eighth place in the qualifying round, failing to advance to the final.
