= Sajjad Behrouzi =

Iranian weightlifter

Personal information
- Native name: سجاد بهروزی
- Nationality: Iranian
- Born: 20 September 1989 (age 37) Marvdasht, Iran
- Weight: 68.42 kg (150.8 lb)

Sport
- Country: Iran
- Sport: Weightlifting
- Event: 69 kg

Achievements and titles
- Personal bests: Snatch: 148 kg (2012); Clean and jerk: 176 kg (2011); Total: 323 kg (2012)
Medal record
Asian Championships
Representing Iran
Bronze medal – third place	2012 Pyeongtaek	69 kg
West Asian Games
Gold medal – first place	2005 Doha	56 kg

Sajjad Behrouzi (Persian: سجاد بهروزی, born 20 September 1989) is an Iranian weightlifter who won the bronze medal in the Men's 69 kg weight class at the 2012 Asian Weightlifting Championships. In 2006 he was banned from competing for two years for doping.

== Major results ==
Year	Venue	Weight	Snatch (kg)				Clean & Jerk (kg)				Total	Rank
Year	Venue	Weight	1	2	3	Rank	1	2	3	Rank	Total	Rank
World Championships
2005	Doha, Qatar	56 kg	110	115	~~117~~	8	130	136	140	11	255	8
2009	Goyang, South Korea	62 kg	135	~~138~~	~~141~~	8	161	~~166~~	~~171~~	9	296	8
2011	Paris, France	69 kg	140	145	~~150~~	7	176	~~182~~	~~182~~	13	321	9
2013	Wrocław, Poland	69 kg	140	~~145~~	~~145~~	8	168	~~175~~	~~175~~	11	308	9
Asian Championships
2005	Dubai, United Arab Emirates	56 kg	110			6	137			5	247	5
2012	Pyeongtaek, South Korea	69 kg	143	148	~~151~~	1st place, gold medalist(s)	175	~~180~~	~~180~~	4	323	3rd place, bronze medalist(s)
2015	(Taiwan) Phuket, Thailand	69 kg	~~133~~	~~133~~	133	8	160	~~168~~	~~168~~	9	293	9
West Asian Games
2005	Doha, Qatar	56 kg	110			1st place, gold medalist(s)	135			1st place, gold medalist(s)	245	1st place, gold medalist(s)
World Junior Championships
2006	Hangzhou, China	56 kg	120	~~125~~	125	8	145	~~150~~	~~150~~	12	270	9
2009	Bucharest, Romania	62 kg	125	130	133	3rd place, bronze medalist(s)	153	157	~~161~~	2nd place, silver medalist(s)	290	3rd place, bronze medalist(s)
