= Padideh =

Padideh (پدیده) is a Persian girl's name meaning "phenomenon".

- Padideh F.C. Iranian football club based in Mashhad, also called Padide
- Padideh Bolourizadeh 1974 Iranian track and field athlete and volleyball player
- Padideh Shandiz Iranian private joint-stock holding company active in restaurants
- Padideh Jalali, Ph.D. CEO of UpperMark, Inc., specializing in alternative investments and CAIA exam study resources.
