= Mohammad Bidarian =

Iranian swimmer

Personal information
- Full name: Mohammad Bidarian
- Nationality: Iran
- Born: September 18, 1988 (age 37) Tehran, Iran
- Height: 1.86 m (6 ft 1 in)
- Weight: 87 kg (192 lb; 13.7 st)

Sport
- Sport: Swimming
- Club: Moghavemat Basij
Medal record
Representing Iran
Men's swimming
Asian Indoor Games
Silver medal – second place	2009 Hanoi	4×100 m freestyle relay
Bronze medal – third place	2009 Hanoi	4×50 m medley relay
West Asian Games
Silver medal – second place	2005 Doha	4×200 m freestyle relay

Mohammad Bidarian (Persian: محمد بیداریان; born September 9, 1988, in Tehran) is an Iranian swimmer. He holds the Iranian record for the 50 meters freestyle with a time of 23.67 seconds. Bidarian competed in 2012 Summer Olympics – Men's 100 metre freestyle, finishing 42nd.
