= Asghar Ebrahimi =

Iranian weightlifter (born 1982)

Medal record

Men's weightlifting

Representing Iran

Asian Games
Silver medal – second place	2010 Guangzhou	94 kg

Asian Championships
Gold medal – first place	2005 Dubai	94 kg
Gold medal – first place	2008 Kanazawa	94 kg
Silver medal – second place	2009 Taldykorgan	105 kg
Bronze medal – third place	2003 Qinhuangdao	85 kg

West Asian Games
Gold medal – first place	2005 Doha	94 kg

Asghar Ebrahimi Farbod Komachali (Persian: اصغر ابراهیمی فربد کماچالی, born 1 April 1982 in Rasht) is an Iranian weightlifter.

== Major results ==
Year	Venue	Weight	Snatch (kg)				Clean & Jerk (kg)				Total	Rank
Year	Venue	Weight	1	2	3	Rank	1	2	3	Rank	Total	Rank
Olympic Games
2004	Athen, Greece	94 kg	~~165~~	165	~~172.5~~	17	190	~~200~~	~~202.5~~	16	355	16
2008	Beijing, China	94 kg	180	~~184~~	~~184~~	3	~~212~~	212	~~217~~	7	392	4
World Championships
2005	Doha, Qatar	94 kg	~~175~~	~~175~~	177	6	205	210	~~214~~	9	387	5
2009	Goyang, South Korea	94 kg	176	~~181~~	~~182~~	3rd place, bronze medalist(s)	200	~~206~~	--	10	376	7
2010	Antalya, Turkey	94 kg	173	~~180~~	~~181~~	10	201	~~210~~	~~210~~	17	374	13
2011	Paris, France	94 kg	175	~~180~~	~~181~~	10	201	~~208~~	~~208~~	17	376	14
Asian Games
2010	Guangzhou, China	94 kg	179	183	~~186~~	1	205	210	~~213~~	3	393	2nd place, silver medalist(s)
Asian Championships
2003	Qinhuangdao, China	94 kg	157.5			3rd place, bronze medalist(s)	192.5			3rd place, bronze medalist(s)	350	3rd place, bronze medalist(s)
2004	Almaty, Kazakhstan	94 kg	170			3rd place, bronze medalist(s)	205			3rd place, bronze medalist(s)	375	4
2005	Dubai, United Arab Emirates	94 kg	175			1st place, gold medalist(s)	205			1st place, gold medalist(s)	380	1st place, gold medalist(s)
2008	Kanazawa, Japan	94 kg	170	180	--	1st place, gold medalist(s)	200	205	~~212~~	1st place, gold medalist(s)	385	1st place, gold medalist(s)
2009	(Kazakhstan) Taldykorgan, kazakhstan	105 kg	175	180	~~185~~	2nd place, silver medalist(s)	205	210	~~217~~	3rd place, bronze medalist(s)	390	2nd place, silver medalist(s)
West Asian Games
2005	Doha, Qatar	94 kg	180			1	205			1	385	1st place, gold medalist(s)
