= Hamid Reza Mobarrez =

Iranian swimmer (born 1981)

Personal information
- Full name: Hamid Reza Mobarrez
- Nationality: Iran
- Born: February 18, 1981 (age 45) Mashhad, Iran
- Height: 1.88 m (6 ft 2 in)
- Weight: 78 kg (172 lb; 12.3 st)

Sport
- Sport: Swimming
Medal record
Representing Iran
Men's swimming
West Asian Games
Gold medal – first place	2005 Doha	50 m freestyle
Gold medal – first place	2005 Doha	50 m butterfly
Gold medal – first place	2005 Doha	4×100 m medley relay

Hamid Reza Mobarrez (Persian: حمیدرضا مبرز; born February 18, 1981, in Mashhad) is an Iranian swimmer. Mobarrez competed in 2000 Summer Olympics – Men's 100 metre Freestyle and finished 65th.

He also represented Iran at the 2004 Rome Championships and 2007 Telstra Grand Prix 2, Canberra In 2007, he held Iran's national record for 100 metres Butterfly with a time of 55:84 seconds.

Mobarrez subsequently migrated to Australia, where he became the swimming coach at Kincoppal School. On 11 January 2018, Mobarrez and his family were involved in a head-on car collision at Milton, New South Wales. His wife was killed and his five-year-old son was critically injured. The driver of the other vehicle was charged with dangerous driving occasioning death, two counts of dangerous driving occasioning grievous bodily harm, negligent driving occasioning death and negligent driving occasioning grievous bodily harm.
