= Lebanon men's national handball team =

Lebanon

Information
- Association: Lebanese Handball Federation

Colours
1st	2nd

Results

Asian Championship
- Appearances: 3 (First in 2008)
- Best result: 8th (2010)
- Last updated on Unknown.

The Lebanon men's national handball team represents Lebanon in international handball.

== Tournament history ==
=== Asian Championship ===
- 2008 – 9th
- 2010 – 8th
- 2016 – 10th
