= Handball at the 1990 Asian Games – Men's tournament =

Men at the 1990 Asian Games
- Venue: Beijiao Gymnasium
- Date: 27 September – 5 October 1990
- Nations: 6

Medalists
gold medal	South Korea
silver medal	Japan
bronze medal	Saudi Arabia

Men's handball at the 1990 Asian Games was held in Beijiao Gymnasium, Beijing from 27 September to 5 October 1990.

== Results ==
Pos	Team	Pld	W	D	L	GF	GA	GD	Pts
1	South Korea	5	5	0	0	161	124	+37	10
2	Japan	5	4	0	1	138	87	+51	8
3	Saudi Arabia	5	3	0	2	121	124	−3	6
4	China	5	2	0	3	132	113	+19	4
5	North Korea	5	1	0	4	122	163	−41	2
6	United Arab Emirates	5	0	0	5	96	159	−63	0

Source: Results

27 September	North Korea	15–34	China	Beijiao Gymnasium, Beijing

27 September	Saudi Arabia	29–23	United Arab Emirates	Beijiao Gymnasium, Beijing

27 September	South Korea	26–25	Japan	Beijiao Gymnasium, Beijing

29 September	Saudi Arabia	16–18	Japan	Beijiao Gymnasium, Beijing

29 September	United Arab Emirates	19–33	China	Beijiao Gymnasium, Beijing

29 September	South Korea	38–27	North Korea	Beijiao Gymnasium, Beijing

1 October	United Arab Emirates	26–32	North Korea	Beijiao Gymnasium, Beijing

1 October	South Korea	34–25	Saudi Arabia	Beijiao Gymnasium, Beijing

1 October	China	21–29	Japan	Beijiao Gymnasium, Beijing

3 October	South Korea	32–21	United Arab Emirates	Beijiao Gymnasium, Beijing

3 October	Japan	33–17	North Korea	Beijiao Gymnasium, Beijing

3 October	China	18–19	Saudi Arabia	Beijiao Gymnasium, Beijing

4 October	North Korea	31–32	Saudi Arabia	Beijiao Gymnasium, Beijing

5 October	Japan	33–7	United Arab Emirates	Beijiao Gymnasium, Beijing

5 October	South Korea	31–26	China	Beijiao Gymnasium, Beijing

== Final standing ==
Rank	Team	Pld	W	D	L
1st place, gold medalist(s)	South Korea	5	5	0	0
2nd place, silver medalist(s)	Japan	5	4	0	1
3rd place, bronze medalist(s)	Saudi Arabia	5	3	0	2
4	China	5	2	0	3
5	North Korea	5	1	0	4
6	United Arab Emirates	5	0	0	5
