= Mustafa Al-Karad =

Qatari handball player (born 1987)

Personal information
- Full name: Mustafa Al-Salti Al-Karad
- Nationality: Syrian/Qatari
- Born: 16 March 1987 (age 39)
- Height: 1.86 m (6 ft 1 in)

Sport
- Sport: Handball
- Position: Right back
- Current club: Al Sadd
- Number: 5
National team
Years	Team		
2006–2010	Syria		
–	Qatar	14	(22)

Mustafa Al-Salti Al-Karad (born 16 March 1987) is a Syrian-born Qatari handball player for Al Sadd and the Qatari national team.

He competed at the 2016 Summer Olympics.

He also played for Syrian national team from 2006 to 2010.
