= 2016 Asian Men's Handball Championship =

2016 Asian Championship

Tournament details
- Host country: Bahrain
- Venues: 2 (in 2 host cities)
- Dates: 15–28 January
- Teams: 11 (from 1 confederation)

Final positions
- Champions: Qatar (2nd title)
- Runners-up: Bahrain
- Third place: Japan
- Fourth place: Saudi Arabia

Tournament statistics
- Matches played: 35
- Goals scored: 1,802 (51.49 per match)

The 2016 Asian Men's Handball Championship was the 17th edition of the Asian Men's Handball Championship, held from 15 to 28 January 2016 in Isa Town and Manama, Bahrain. It acted as the Asian qualifying tournament for the 2017 World Championship.

In a repeat of the final of the 2014 edition of the championship, Qatar secured their second consecutive title by defeating Bahrain 27–22 in the final. The bronze medal was captured by Japan, by beating Saudi Arabia 25–16.

== Draw ==
Group A	Group B
Qatar; South Korea; Oman; Japan; Syria; ~~Macau~~	Iran; United Arab Emirates; Saudi Arabia; China; Lebanon; Bahrain

== Preliminary round ==
All times are local (UTC+3).

=== Group A ===
Pos	Team	Pld	W	D	L	GF	GA	GD	Pts	Qualification
1	Qatar	4	4	0	0	136	76	+60	8	Advanced to semifinals
2	Japan	4	3	0	1	108	93	+15	6	Advanced to semifinals
3	South Korea	4	2	0	2	109	111	−2	4	Advanced to 5–8th place semifinals
4	Oman	4	1	0	3	96	113	−17	2	Advanced to 5–8th place semifinals
5	Syria	4	0	0	4	69	125	−56	0	Advanced to 9–11th place semifinal
6	Macau	0	0	0	0	0	0	0	0	Withdrew

Source: asianhandball
Rules for classification: 1) points; 2) head-to-head points; 3) head-to-head goal difference; 4) head-to-head number of goals scored; 5) goal difference.

16 January 2016; 16:00	Japan	31–25	South Korea	Khalifa Sports City Hall, Isa Town
16 January 2016; 16:00		(14–10)		Khalifa Sports City Hall, Isa Town

16 January 2016; 18:00	Oman	19–37	Qatar	Khalifa Sports City Hall, Isa Town
16 January 2016; 18:00		(8–19)		Khalifa Sports City Hall, Isa Town

18 January 2016; 16:00	South Korea	23–22	Oman	Khalifa Sports City Hall, Isa Town
18 January 2016; 16:00		(11–12)		Khalifa Sports City Hall, Isa Town

18 January 2016; 18:00	Syria	10–32	Qatar	Khalifa Sports City Hall, Isa Town
18 January 2016; 18:00		(6–18)		Khalifa Sports City Hall, Isa Town

20 January 2016; 16:00	Qatar	29–24	Japan	Khalifa Sports City Hall, Isa Town
20 January 2016; 16:00		(15–12)		Khalifa Sports City Hall, Isa Town

20 January 2016; 18:00	Oman	31–24	Syria	Khalifa Sports City Hall, Isa Town
20 January 2016; 18:00		(15–11)		Khalifa Sports City Hall, Isa Town

22 January 2016; 16:00	Oman	24–29	Japan	Khalifa Sports City Hall, Isa Town
22 January 2016; 16:00		(11–16)		Khalifa Sports City Hall, Isa Town

22 January 2016; 18:00	South Korea	38–20	Syria	Khalifa Sports City Hall, Isa Town
22 January 2016; 18:00		(19–5)		Khalifa Sports City Hall, Isa Town

24 January 2016; 16:00	Japan	24–15	Syria	Khalifa Sports City Hall, Isa Town
24 January 2016; 16:00		(11–6)		Khalifa Sports City Hall, Isa Town

24 January 2016; 18:00	Qatar	38–23	South Korea	Khalifa Sports City Hall, Isa Town
24 January 2016; 18:00		(19–13)		Khalifa Sports City Hall, Isa Town

=== Group B ===
Pos	Team	Pld	W	D	L	GF	GA	GD	Pts	Qualification
1	Bahrain (H)	5	5	0	0	162	102	+60	10	Advanced to semifinals
2	Saudi Arabia	5	3	1	1	133	96	+37	7	Advanced to semifinals
3	Iran	5	3	0	2	138	129	+9	6	Advanced to 5–8th place semifinals
4	United Arab Emirates	5	2	1	2	123	119	+4	5	Advanced to 5–8th place semifinals
5	Lebanon	5	1	0	4	110	159	−49	2	Advanced to 9–11th place semifinal
6	China	5	0	0	5	101	162	−61	0	Advanced to 9–11th place semifinal

Source: asianhandball
Rules for classification: 1) points; 2) head-to-head points; 3) head-to-head goal difference; 4) head-to-head number of goals scored; 5) goal difference.
(H) Hosts

15 January 2016; 14:00	China	17–21	United Arab Emirates	Khalifa Sports City Hall, Isa Town
15 January 2016; 14:00		(5–9)		Khalifa Sports City Hall, Isa Town

15 January 2016; 16:00	Saudi Arabia	26–21	Iran	Khalifa Sports City Hall, Isa Town
15 January 2016; 16:00		(12–10)		Khalifa Sports City Hall, Isa Town

15 January 2016; 19:30	Lebanon	18–41	Bahrain	Khalifa Sports City Hall, Isa Town
15 January 2016; 19:30		(7–16)		Khalifa Sports City Hall, Isa Town

17 January 2016; 15:00	United Arab Emirates	17–17	Saudi Arabia	Khalifa Sports City Hall, Isa Town
17 January 2016; 15:00		(6–7)		Khalifa Sports City Hall, Isa Town

17 January 2016; 17:00	Lebanon	26–31	Iran	Khalifa Sports City Hall, Isa Town
17 January 2016; 17:00		(13–16)		Khalifa Sports City Hall, Isa Town

17 January 2016; 19:00	China	18–41	Bahrain	Khalifa Sports City Hall, Isa Town
17 January 2016; 19:00		(7–18)		Khalifa Sports City Hall, Isa Town

19 January 2016; 15:00	Iran	36–18	China	Khalifa Sports City Hall, Isa Town
19 January 2016; 15:00		(17–10)		Khalifa Sports City Hall, Isa Town

19 January 2016; 17:00	Saudi Arabia	32–13	Lebanon	Khalifa Sports City Hall, Isa Town
19 January 2016; 17:00		(16–4)		Khalifa Sports City Hall, Isa Town

19 January 2016; 19:00	Bahrain	28–26	United Arab Emirates	Khalifa Sports City Hall, Isa Town
19 January 2016; 19:00		(16–13)		Khalifa Sports City Hall, Isa Town

21 January 2016; 15:00	Saudi Arabia	34–20	China	Khalifa Sports City Hall, Isa Town
21 January 2016; 15:00		(16–8)		Khalifa Sports City Hall, Isa Town

21 January 2016; 17:00	United Arab Emirates	27–23	Lebanon	Khalifa Sports City Hall, Isa Town
21 January 2016; 17:00		(12–16)		Khalifa Sports City Hall, Isa Town

21 January 2016; 19:00	Iran	16–27	Bahrain	Khalifa Sports City Hall, Isa Town
21 January 2016; 19:00		(8–13)		Khalifa Sports City Hall, Isa Town

23 January 2016; 15:00	Iran	34–32	United Arab Emirates	Khalifa Sports City Hall, Isa Town
23 January 2016; 15:00		(15–15)		Khalifa Sports City Hall, Isa Town

23 January 2016; 17:00	China	28–30	Lebanon	Khalifa Sports City Hall, Isa Town
23 January 2016; 17:00		(18–15)		Khalifa Sports City Hall, Isa Town

23 January 2016; 19:00	Bahrain	25–24	Saudi Arabia	Khalifa Sports City Hall, Isa Town
23 January 2016; 19:00		(15–12)		Khalifa Sports City Hall, Isa Town

== Knockout stage ==
Semifinals
26 January – Isa Town
Qatar	22
Saudi Arabia	13
26 January – Isa Town
Bahrain	29
Japan	23

Final
28 January – Isa Town
Qatar	27
Bahrain	22
Third place
28 January – Isa Town
Saudi Arabia	16
Japan	25

5th place bracket

5–8th place semifinals
25 January – Manama
South Korea	32
United Arab Emirates	23
25 January – Manama
Iran	32
Oman	27

Fifth place
27 January – Manama
South Korea	28
Iran	29
Seventh place
27 January – Manama
United Arab Emirates (Pen)	31
Oman	30

=== 9–11th place semifinal ===
25 January 2016; 15:00	Syria	24–31	China	Bahrain Handball Federation Hall, Manama
25 January 2016; 15:00		(13–11)		Bahrain Handball Federation Hall, Manama

=== 5–8th place semifinals ===
25 January 2016; 17:00	South Korea	32–23	United Arab Emirates	Bahrain Handball Federation Hall, Manama
25 January 2016; 17:00		(16–9)		Bahrain Handball Federation Hall, Manama

25 January 2016; 19:00	Iran	32–27	Oman	Bahrain Handball Federation Hall, Manama
25 January 2016; 19:00		(14–14)		Bahrain Handball Federation Hall, Manama

=== Semifinals ===
26 January 2016; 17:00	Qatar	22–13	Saudi Arabia	Khalifa Sports City Hall, Isa Town
26 January 2016; 17:00		(12–9)		Khalifa Sports City Hall, Isa Town

26 January 2016; 19:00	Bahrain	29–23	Japan	Khalifa Sports City Hall, Isa Town
26 January 2016; 19:00		(15–10)		Khalifa Sports City Hall, Isa Town

=== Ninth place game ===
27 January 2016; 15:00	China	30–23	Lebanon	Khalifa Sports City Hall, Isa Town
27 January 2016; 15:00		(10–15)		Khalifa Sports City Hall, Isa Town

=== Seventh place game ===
27 January 2016
17:00
United Arab Emirates
31–30
Oman
Khalifa Sports City Hall, Isa Town

(14–12)

FT: 26–26 Pen: 5–4

=== Fifth place game ===
27 January 2016; 19:00	South Korea	28–29	Iran	Khalifa Sports City Hall, Isa Town
27 January 2016; 19:00		(16–15)		Khalifa Sports City Hall, Isa Town

=== Third place game ===
28 January 2016; 17:00	Saudi Arabia	16–25	Japan	Khalifa Sports City Hall, Isa Town
28 January 2016; 17:00		(7–12)		Khalifa Sports City Hall, Isa Town

=== Final ===
28 January 2016; 19:00	Qatar	27–22	Bahrain	Khalifa Sports City Hall, Isa Town
28 January 2016; 19:00		(12–11)		Khalifa Sports City Hall, Isa Town

== Final standing ==
Rank	Team
1st place, gold medalist(s)	Qatar
2nd place, silver medalist(s)	Bahrain
3rd place, bronze medalist(s)	Japan
4	Saudi Arabia
5	Iran
6	South Korea
7	United Arab Emirates
8	Oman
9	China
10	Lebanon
11	Syria

Team qualified for the 2017 World Championship
