= Weightlifting at the 2010 Asian Games – Men's 94 kg =

Men's 94 kg at the 2010 Asian Games
- Venue: Dongguan Arena
- Date: 18 November 2010
- Competitors: 18 from 15 nations

Medalists
gold medal	Ilya Ilyin	Kazakhstan
silver medal	Asghar Ebrahimi	Iran
bronze medal	Kim Min-jae	South Korea

The men's 94 kilograms event at the 2010 Asian Games took place on 18 November 2010 at Dongguan Arena.

== Schedule ==
All times are China Standard Time (UTC+08:00)

Date	Time	Event
Thursday, 18 November 2010	12:30	Group B
Thursday, 18 November 2010	16:30	Group A

== Records ==
Prior to this competition, the existing world, Asian and Games records were as follows.

World Record	Snatch	Akakios Kakiasvilis (GRE)	188 kg	Athens, Greece	27 November 1999
World Record	Clean & Jerk	Szymon Kołecki (POL)	232 kg	Sofia, Bulgaria	29 April 2000
World Record	Total	Akakios Kakiasvilis (GRE)	412 kg	Athens, Greece	27 November 1999
Asian Record	Snatch	Kourosh Bagheri (IRI)	187 kg	Sydney, Australia	24 September 2000
Asian Record	Clean & Jerk	Ilya Ilyin (KAZ)	226 kg	Doha, Qatar	5 December 2006
Asian Record	Total	Kourosh Bagheri (IRI)	407 kg	Antalya, Turkey	9 November 2001
Games Record	Snatch	Bakhyt Akhmetov (KAZ)	185 kg	Busan, South Korea	8 October 2002
Games Record	Clean & Jerk	Ilya Ilyin (KAZ)	226 kg	Doha, Qatar	5 December 2006
Games Record	Total	Bakhyt Akhmetov (KAZ)	400 kg	Busan, South Korea	8 October 2002

== Results ==
Legend

- NM — No mark

Rank	Athlete	Group	Body weight	Snatch (kg)				Clean & Jerk (kg)				Total
Rank	Athlete	Group	Body weight	1	2	3	Result	1	2	3	Result	Total
1st place, gold medalist(s)	Ilya Ilyin (KAZ)	A	93.68	170	175	~~178~~	175	215	219	~~227~~	219	394
2nd place, silver medalist(s)	Asghar Ebrahimi (IRI)	A	93.44	179	183	~~186~~	183	205	210	~~213~~	210	393
3rd place, bronze medalist(s)	Kim Min-jae (KOR)	A	93.86	170	175	178	178	205	~~210~~	~~210~~	205	383
4	Zhang Shengguo (CHN)	A	93.00	170	~~175~~	~~175~~	170	210	~~214~~	~~214~~	210	380
5	Ruslan Nurudinov (UZB)	A	91.62	170	~~175~~	~~175~~	170	205	209	~~214~~	209	379
6	Almas Uteshov (KAZ)	A	92.88	155	165	170	170	201	~~213~~	~~213~~	201	371
7	Jung Hyeon-seop (KOR)	A	93.30	157	~~162~~	162	162	203	~~213~~	~~213~~	203	365
8	Suthiphon Watthanakasikam (THA)	B	93.33	~~162~~	162	167	167	182	190	195	195	362
9	Yaser Dadvand (IRI)	A	93.78	165	~~170~~	~~170~~	165	192	~~200~~	~~200~~	192	357
10	Hsieh Wei-chun (TPE)	B	93.48	~~152~~	~~152~~	152	152	~~190~~	190	~~202~~	190	342
11	Trần Văn Hóa (VIE)	B	93.27	138	144	148	148	172	182	~~185~~	182	330
12	Ali Jadid (SYR)	B	93.82	145	150	~~155~~	150	~~175~~	~~175~~	175	175	325
13	Genta Kawabata (JPN)	B	93.04	140	~~145~~	~~145~~	140	175	180	~~185~~	180	320
14	Shawgi Al-Qaisoum (KSA)	B	91.35	130	~~140~~	140	140	160	~~170~~	~~170~~	160	300
15	Sakher Qalaja (PLE)	B	93.68	120	125	131	131	~~160~~	161	~~170~~	161	292
16	Hamid Al-Otaibi (IOC)	B	89.91	100	111	~~115~~	111	130	140	145	145	256
17	Saeed Shabib Al-Dosari (QAT)	B	93.20	85	~~90~~	90	90	110	115	120	120	210
—	Ruslan Ramazanow (TKM)	B	93.82	155	~~161~~	~~162~~	155	~~185~~	—	—	—	NM
