= Volleyball at the 2005 West Asian Games =

- Venue: Al-Rayyan Indoor Hall
- Date: 2–9 December 2005

Volleyball was contested at the 2005 West Asian Games in Doha, Qatar from 2 December to 9 December. All events took place at Al-Rayyan Indoor Hall.

== Results ==
Pos	Team	Pld	W	L	Pts	SPW	SPL	SPR	SW	SL	SR
1	Qatar	5	5	0	10	434	366	1.186	15	3	5.000
2	Iran	5	4	1	9	431	344	1.253	14	4	3.500
3	Bahrain	5	3	2	8	413	405	1.020	11	8	1.375
4	Kuwait	5	2	3	7	335	345	0.971	6	9	0.667
5	Oman	5	1	4	6	342	399	0.857	5	12	0.417
6	Yemen	5	0	5	5	280	376	0.745	0	15	0.000

Source: Results

Date	Time		Score		Set 1	Set 2	Set 3	Set 4	Set 5	Total
02 Dec	12:00	Iran	3–0	Kuwait	25–14	25–15	26–24			76–53
02 Dec	14:00	Bahrain	3–2	Oman	25–17	22–25	19–25	25–19	15–10	106–96
02 Dec	16:00	Qatar	3–0	Yemen	25–15	25–14	26–24			76–53
03 Dec	12:00	Kuwait	0–3	Bahrain	20–25	23–25	23–25			66–75
03 Dec	14:00	Yemen	0–3	Iran	15–25	19–25	16–25			50–75
03 Dec	16:00	Oman	0–3	Qatar	18–25	23–25	13–25			54–75
05 Dec	12:00	Oman	3–0	Yemen	25–23	25–23	25–22			75–68
05 Dec	14:00	Iran	3–1	Bahrain	25–12	22–25	25–20	25–15		97–72
05 Dec	16:00	Qatar	3–0	Kuwait	26–24	25–20	25–22			76–66
07 Dec	12:00	Yemen	0–3	Kuwait	19–25	22–25	20–25			61–75
07 Dec	14:00	Iran	3–0	Oman	25–20	25–19	25–21			75–60
07 Dec	16:00	Qatar	3–1	Bahrain	23–25	25–19	25–22	25–19		98–85
08 Dec	13:00	Kuwait	3–0	Oman	25–20	25–22	25–15			75–57
08 Dec	15:00	Yemen	0–3	Bahrain	18–25	14–25	16–25			48–75
09 Dec	15:00	Iran	2–3	Qatar	30–28	25–14	15–25	23–25	15–17	108–109
