= Padideh Bolourizadeh =

Iranian athlete and volleyball player (born 1974)

Medal record

Representing Iran

Women's athletics

Asian Indoor Championships
Silver medal – second place	2004 Tehran	Pentathlon
Bronze medal – third place	2004 Tehran	60 m hurdles

West Asian Games
Gold medal – first place	2005 Doha	4×400 m relay
Bronze medal – third place	2005 Doha	Long jump

Padideh Boloorizadeh (Persian: پدیده بلوری‌زاده, born in December 1974 in Tehran) is an Iranian ex track and field athlete and ex volleyball player. In 2022 and 2024 she led Iran's U20 women Volleyball National Team as the head coach in the U20 Asian women volleyball Championships. She was also the head coach of Iran's women Volleyball National Team that participated in the Women Volleyball Asian challenge cup 2024.

Padideh started track and field at a very young age and started setting new records. She set a new record of 1.64 meters for the Iranian women's high jump in 1996 after 23 years. She also broke Iran's record in different events pentathlon, heptathlon and 60 meter hurdles in Iran. Padideh is an IAAF level 4 jumps coach and a level 2 IAAF coaching course lecturer. She coached Iranian sprinters and combined event athletes that led to new national records and Asian podium during the years.

Other than track and field, she has been involved in volleyball and was a member of the Iranian national volleyball team for years. She was selected as Iran Women National Volleyball team captain in 2004 to lead the team in their first attendance in the Women's Asian Volleyball Championships. She is a FIVB certified level 3 coach and served the national and select club teams as head coach, strength and conditioning and assistant coach after retiring from playing herself. She worked for Iran University of science and technology since 1992, while teaching at an invitee course instructor at Islamic Azad University, Shahid Beheshty University, Alzahra University as well as Iran Olympic Academy, Volleyball and Athletics federations as the coaching course lecturer. She also worked at Athletics Canada as the manager in coach development and training. She holds a PhD in sport management and planning from Islamic Azad University-Central Tehran branch.
