= Lebanese Handball Federation =

Handball Federation in Lebanon

Lebanese Handball Federation French: Fédération Libanaise de Handball (FLH) Arabic: الاتحاد اللبناني لكرة اليد LHF
- IOC nation: Lebanese Republic (LBN)
- Sport: Handball
- Other sports: Beach handball

HISTORY
- Year of formation: 1968; 57 years ago

AFFILIATIONS
- International federation: International Handball Federation (IHF)
- IHF member since: 1968
- Continental association: Asian Handball Federation
- National Olympic Committee: Lebanese Olympic Committee

GOVERNING BODY
- President: Abdallah Achour

HEADQUARTERS
- Address: Reyad Al Solh P.O. Box 7124, Beirut
- Country: Lebanon
- Secretary General: Georges Farah

The Lebanese Handball Federation (French: Fédération Libanaise de Handball; Arabic: الاتحاد اللبناني لكرة اليد) (LHF) is the administrative and controlling body for handball and beach handball in Lebanese Republic. Founded in 1968, LHF is a member of Asian Handball Federation (AHF) and the International Handball Federation (IHF).

== National teams ==
- Lebanon men's national handball team
