= Syria men's national handball team =

Information
- Nickname: Nosour Qasioun (Arabic: نسور قاسيون, lit. 'Qasioun Eagles')
- Association: Syrian Arab Handball Federation
- Coach: Raafe Bajbouj

Colours
1st	2nd

Results

World Championship
- Appearances: none

Asian Championship
- Appearances: 5 (First in 1987)
- Best result: 6th (2010)
- Last updated on 16 December 2021.

Syria men's national handball team
Medal record

West Asian Games
Silver medal – second place	2002 Kuwait	

Pan Arab Games
Gold medal – first place	1976 Damascus	
Bronze medal – third place	1965 Cairo	

The Syrian national handball team is the national handball team of Syria and is controlled by the Syrian Arab Handball Federation.

== Competition record ==
=== Asian Championship ===
Champions Runners up Third place Fourth place

Year	Round
Kuwait 1977	Did not participate
China 1979	Did not participate
South Korea 1983	Did not participate
Jordan 1987	8th place
China 1989	Did not participate
Japan 1991	12th place
Bahrain 1993	12th place
Kuwait 1995	Did not participate
Japan 2000	Did not participate
Iran 2002	Did not participate
Qatar 2004	Did not participate
Thailand 2006	Did not participate
Iran 2008	Did not participate
Lebanon 2010	6th place
Saudi Arabia 2012	Did not participate
Bahrain 2014	Did not participate
Bahrain 2016	11th place
South Korea 2018	Did not participate
Kuwait 2020	Did not participate
Saudi Arabia 2022	Did not participate

=== Asian Games ===
- 2006: 5th

=== West Asian Games ===
- 2002: (silver) Silver medal
- 2005: 4th

=== Pan Arab Games ===
- 1965: (bronze) Bronze medal
- 1976: (gold) Gold medal

=== Mediterranean Games ===
- 1987: 4th
- 2001: 9th

=== Islamic Solidarity Games ===
- 2005: 4th

== Players ==
- Nahil Rajab
- Lousy Koureyh
- Jihan Bilal
- Mervat Maksoud
- Rima Bitar
- Ragda Bakri
- Zenab Sido
- Marcel Mahfoud
- Kifah Rabah
- Hind Saqr
- Hyam Mousa
- Omar Buric
- Sani Aletovic
- Muaz Kusic
- Sulejmen Brkic
