= 1991 Asian Men's Handball Championship =

1991 Asian Championship
Tournament details
- Host country: Japan
- Venue: 1 (in 1 host city)
- Dates: 22 August – 1 September
- Teams: 12 (from 1 confederation)

Final positions
- Champions: South Korea (4th title)
- Runners-up: Japan
- Third place: China
- Fourth place: Qatar

Tournament statistics
- Matches played: 34
- Goals scored: 1,679 (49.38 per match)

The 1991 Asian Men's Handball Championship was the sixth Asian Championship, which was taking place from 22 August to 1 September 1991 in Hiroshima, Japan.

South Korea won their fourth consecutive and overall title with a finals win over Japan.

== Preliminary round ==
=== Group A ===
Team	Pld	W	D	L	GF	GA	GD	Pts
Japan (H)	2	2	0	0	50	33	+17	4
Qatar	2	1	0	1	40	38	+2	2
North Korea	2	0	0	2	33	52	−19	0

(H) Hosts

Japan	23–15	Qatar	Hiroshima
	JHA		Hiroshima

24 August 1991	North Korea	18–27	Japan	Hiroshima
24 August 1991		JHA		Hiroshima

Qatar	25–15	North Korea	Hiroshima

=== Group B ===
Team	Pld	W	D	L	GF	GA	GD	Pts
Kuwait	2	2	0	0	53	37	+16	4
United Arab Emirates	2	1	0	1	49	49	0	2
Syria	2	0	0	2	44	60	−16	0

Kuwait	29–19	Syria	Hiroshima

24 August 1991	United Arab Emirates	18–24	Kuwait	Hiroshima

Syria	25–31	United Arab Emirates	Hiroshima

=== Group C ===
Team	Pld	W	D	L	GF	GA	GD	Pts
South Korea	2	2	0	0	77	40	+37	4
Bahrain	2	0	1	1	49	65	−16	1
Iran	2	0	1	1	53	74	−21	1

South Korea	34–18	Bahrain	Hiroshima

24 August 1991	Iran	22–43	South Korea	Hiroshima

Bahrain	31–31	Iran	Hiroshima

=== Group D ===
Team	Pld	W	D	L	GF	GA	GD	Pts
China	2	2	0	0	57	24	+33	4
Chinese Taipei	2	0	1	1	37	50	−13	1
Saudi Arabia	2	0	1	1	29	49	−20	1

China	29–16	Chinese Taipei	Hiroshima

24 August 1991	Chinese Taipei	21–21	Saudi Arabia	Hiroshima

Saudi Arabia	8–28	China	Hiroshima

== Placement 9th–12th ==
Semifinals
North Korea	33
Iran	31
Syria	22
Saudi Arabia	26

9th/10th
North Korea	37
Saudi Arabia	36
11th/12th
Iran	26
Syria	25

27 August 1991	North Korea	33–32 or 33–31	Iran	Hiroshima
27 August 1991		(17-15)		Hiroshima

27 August 1991	Syria	22–26	Saudi Arabia	Hiroshima
27 August 1991		(9-10)		Hiroshima

=== 11th/12th ===
Iran	26–25	Syria	Hiroshima
	(16-12)		Hiroshima

=== 9th/10th ===
North Korea	37–36	Saudi Arabia	Hiroshima
	(15-13)		Hiroshima

== Main round ==
=== Group I ===
Team	Pld	W	D	L	GF	GA	GD	Pts
Japan (H)	3	3	0	0	74	56	+18	6
Qatar	3	2	0	1	60	58	+2	4
Bahrain	3	1	0	2	63	68	−5	2
Kuwait	3	0	0	3	52	67	−15	0

(H) Hosts

Qatar	21–13	Kuwait	Hiroshima
	(10-5)		Hiroshima

Japan	25–21	Bahrain	Hiroshima
	(13-9)		Hiroshima
	JHA		Hiroshima

27 August 1991	Bahrain	21–20	Kuwait	Hiroshima
27 August 1991		(11-8)		Hiroshima

27 August 1991	Japan	24–10 or 24–16	Qatar	Hiroshima
27 August 1991		(11-6)		Hiroshima
27 August 1991		JHA		Hiroshima

Japan	25–19	Kuwait	Hiroshima
	(12-9)		Hiroshima
	JHA		Hiroshima

Bahrain	21–23	Qatar	Hiroshima
	(12-11)		Hiroshima

=== Group II ===
Team	Pld	W	D	L	GF	GA	GD	Pts
South Korea	3	3	0	0	120	55	+65	6
China	3	2	0	1	89	72	+17	4
United Arab Emirates	3	0	1	2	61	92	−31	1
Chinese Taipei	3	0	1	2	64	115	−51	1

China	40–19	Chinese Taipei	Hiroshima
	(19-9)		Hiroshima

South Korea	38–14 or 38–15	United Arab Emirates	Hiroshima
	(16-6)		Hiroshima

27 August 1991	China	26–18	United Arab Emirates	Hiroshima
27 August 1991		(12-10)		Hiroshima

27 August 1991	Chinese Taipei	17–47	South Korea	Hiroshima
27 August 1991		(6-26)		Hiroshima

South Korea	35–23	China	Hiroshima
	(18-10)		Hiroshima

United Arab Emirates	28–28	Chinese Taipei	Hiroshima
	(15-15)		Hiroshima

== Placement 5th–8th ==
=== 7th/8th ===
Kuwait	24–28	Chinese Taipei	Hiroshima
	(10-12)		Hiroshima

=== 5th/6th ===
Bahrain	24–22	United Arab Emirates	Hiroshima
	(11-13)		Hiroshima

== Final round ==
Semifinals
Japan	26
China	18
South Korea	32
Qatar	19

Gold medal match
Japan	23
South Korea	27
Bronze medal match
China	29
Qatar	17

=== Semifinals ===
Japan	26–18	China	Hiroshima
	(15-9)		Hiroshima
	JHA		Hiroshima

South Korea	32–19	Qatar	Hiroshima
	(16-10)		Hiroshima

=== Bronze medal match ===
1 September 1991	China	29–17	Qatar	Hiroshima
1 September 1991		(14-10)		Hiroshima

=== Gold medal match ===
1 September 1991	Japan	23–27	South Korea	Hiroshima
1 September 1991		(8-13)		Hiroshima
1 September 1991		JHA		Hiroshima

== Final ranking ==
Final ranking is:

Rank	Team	Qualification(s)
Gold medal	South Korea	1992 OG and 1993 WC
Silver medal	Japan	1992 B-WC
Bronze medal	China	1992 B-WC
4	Qatar	none
5	Bahrain	none
6	United Arab Emirates	none
7	Chinese Taipei	none
8	Kuwait	none
9	North Korea	none
10	Saudi Arabia	none
11	Iran	none
12	Syria	none
