= Milad Masaeli =

Iranian handball player (born 1988)

Personal information
- Nationality: Iranian
- Born: 28 May 1988 (age 38)
- Height: 1.81 m (5 ft 11 in)

Sport
- Sport: Handball
- Position: Right wing
- Current club: Al Arabi Qatar
National team
Years	Team	Apps	(Gls)
12	Iran	105	(320)
Medal record
2010 olampic game asia 2014 asian cup maname

Milad Masaeli (Persian: میلاد مسائلی, born 28 May 1988) is an Iranian handball player for Al Arabi Qatar and the Iranian national team.
