= Time in Lebanon =

Global map of Lebanon, marked in green

Lebanon alternates between Eastern European Time (EET) (UTC+02:00) and Eastern European Summer Time (EEST) (UTC+03:00), because it follows the annual daylight saving time procedure. As such Lebanon begins observing EEST on the last Sunday in March at 00:00, and switches back to EET on the last Sunday of October at 00:00.

== Postponed time change in 2023 ==
On 23 March 2023, two days before the scheduled switch to Eastern European Summer Time (EEST), Lebanon's government postponed the change from 25 March to 20 April. This came within days of a DST postponement also being announced in Palestine. No official explanation was given, but local media suggested the change was made to avoid disruption during the month of Ramadan, during which some Muslims fast from sunrise till sunset.

Due to the lateness of the announcement, smart devices with "automatic time" enabled changed the time on the originally scheduled date of 25 March, and some major media outlets, including MTV, LBCI and OTV, announced that they will not abide by the decision. Different religious communities in Lebanon observed the shift independently. As a result, some places or regions in Lebanon temporarily used different time zones, causing mass confusion. On 27 March, Lebanon's prime minister Najib Mikati announced that EEST would be used starting at midnight of 29 March.
