= North Korea men's national handball team =

North Korea

Information
- Association: Handball Association of the DPR Korea

Colours
1st	2nd

Results

Asian Championship
- Appearances: 1 (First in 1991)
- Best result: 9th (1991)
- Last updated on Unknown.

The North Korea national handball team is the national handball team of North Korea.

== Tournament history ==
=== Asian Championship ===
- 1991 – 9th place
