= Handball at the 2005 West Asian Games =

- Venue: Al-Gharafa Indoor Hall
- Date: 2–9 December 2005

Handball was contested at the 2005 West Asian Games in Doha, Qatar from 2 December to 9 December. All events took place at Al-Gharafa Indoor Hall.

== Results ==
=== Preliminary round ===
==== Group A ====
Pos	Team	Pld	W	D	L	GF	GA	GD	Pts
1	Kuwait	3	2	0	1	93	80	+13	4
2	Saudi Arabia	3	2	0	1	83	81	+2	4
3	Qatar	3	2	0	1	81	82	−1	4
4	Bahrain	3	0	0	3	78	92	−14	0

Source: Results

2 December; 13:00	Kuwait	34–27	Bahrain	Al-Gharafa Indoor Hall, Doha
2 December; 13:00		(18–15)		Al-Gharafa Indoor Hall, Doha

2 December; 15:00	Qatar	23–30	Saudi Arabia	Al-Gharafa Indoor Hall, Doha
2 December; 15:00		(10–17)		Al-Gharafa Indoor Hall, Doha

3 December; 13:00	Kuwait	33–25	Saudi Arabia	Al-Gharafa Indoor Hall, Doha
3 December; 13:00		(18–15)		Al-Gharafa Indoor Hall, Doha

3 December; 15:00	Qatar	30–26	Bahrain	Al-Gharafa Indoor Hall, Doha
3 December; 15:00		(16–14)		Al-Gharafa Indoor Hall, Doha

5 December; 11:00	Bahrain	25–28	Saudi Arabia	Al-Gharafa Indoor Hall, Doha
5 December; 11:00		(13–16)		Al-Gharafa Indoor Hall, Doha

5 December; 15:00	Kuwait	26–28	Qatar	Al-Gharafa Indoor Hall, Doha
5 December; 15:00		(13–11)		Al-Gharafa Indoor Hall, Doha

==== Group B ====
Pos	Team	Pld	W	D	L	GF	GA	GD	Pts
1	Iran	3	3	0	0	84	70	+14	6
2	Syria	3	2	0	1	92	92	0	4
3	Oman	3	0	1	2	86	92	−6	1
4	Jordan	3	0	1	2	82	90	−8	1

Source: Results

2 December; 11:00	Syria	34–29	Oman	Al-Gharafa Indoor Hall, Doha
2 December; 11:00		(19–18)		Al-Gharafa Indoor Hall, Doha

2 December; 17:00	Iran	25–20	Jordan	Al-Gharafa Indoor Hall, Doha
2 December; 17:00		(13–8)		Al-Gharafa Indoor Hall, Doha

3 December; 11:00	Syria	35–32	Jordan	Al-Gharafa Indoor Hall, Doha
3 December; 11:00		(20–14)		Al-Gharafa Indoor Hall, Doha

3 December; 17:00	Iran	28–27	Oman	Al-Gharafa Indoor Hall, Doha
3 December; 17:00		(15–14)		Al-Gharafa Indoor Hall, Doha

5 December; 13:00	Syria	23–31	Iran	Al-Gharafa Indoor Hall, Doha
5 December; 13:00		(6–14)		Al-Gharafa Indoor Hall, Doha

5 December; 17:00	Oman	30–30	Jordan	Al-Gharafa Indoor Hall, Doha
5 December; 17:00		(12–14)		Al-Gharafa Indoor Hall, Doha

=== Placement matches ===
==== Seventh place ====
7 December; 11:00	Bahrain	30–26	Jordan	Al-Gharafa Indoor Hall, Doha
7 December; 11:00		(14–12)		Al-Gharafa Indoor Hall, Doha

==== Fifth place ====
7 December; 13:00	Qatar	30–19	Oman	Al-Gharafa Indoor Hall, Doha
7 December; 13:00		(16–13)		Al-Gharafa Indoor Hall, Doha

=== Final round ===
Semifinals
7 December
Kuwait	32
Syria	27
7 December
Iran	27
Saudi Arabia	24

Final
9 December
Kuwait	33
Iran	26
Third place
9 December
Syria	25
Saudi Arabia	39

==== Semifinals ====
7 December; 15:00	Kuwait	32–27	Syria	Al-Gharafa Indoor Hall, Doha
7 December; 15:00		(13–13)		Al-Gharafa Indoor Hall, Doha

7 December; 17:00	Iran	27–24	Saudi Arabia	Al-Gharafa Indoor Hall, Doha
7 December; 17:00		(13–11)		Al-Gharafa Indoor Hall, Doha

==== Third place ====
9 December; 15:00	Syria	25–39	Saudi Arabia	Al-Gharafa Indoor Hall, Doha
9 December; 15:00		(14–18)		Al-Gharafa Indoor Hall, Doha

==== Final ====
9 December; 17:00	Kuwait	33–26	Iran	Al-Gharafa Indoor Hall, Doha
9 December; 17:00		(18–9)		Al-Gharafa Indoor Hall, Doha
