= Iraq at the 2005 West Asian Games =

- IOC code: IRQ
- NOC: National Olympic Committee of Iraq

in Doha
- Medals Ranked 10th: Gold 2 Silver 1 Bronze 7 Total 10

West Asian Games appearances
- 2005

Iraq made its West Asian Games debut at the 3rd West Asian Games held in Doha, Qatar from December 1, 2005 to December 10, 2005. Iraq ranked 10th with 2 gold medals, a lone silver medal and 7 bronze in this edition of the West Asian Games.
