= Bahrain at the 2005 West Asian Games =

- IOC code: BRN
- NOC: Bahrain Olympic Committee

in Doha
- Medals Ranked 9th: Gold 3 Silver 2 Bronze 2 Total 7

West Asian Games appearances
- 2002; 2005

Bahrain participated in the 3rd West Asian Games held in Doha, Qatar from 1 December 2005 to 10 December 2005. Bahrain ranked 9th with 3 gold medals and 2 silver medals in this edition of the West Asian Games.
