= Lebanon at the 2005 West Asian Games =

- IOC code: LBN
- NOC: Lebanese Olympic Committee

in Doha
- Medals Ranked 7th: Gold 4 Silver 4 Bronze 3 Total 11

West Asian Games appearances
- 1997; 2002; 2005

Lebanon participated in the 3rd West Asian Games held in Doha, Qatar from December 1, 2005 to December 10, 2005. Lebanon ranked 7th with 4 gold medals and 4 silver medals in this edition of the West Asian Games.
