= United Arab Emirates at the 2005 West Asian Games =

- IOC code: UAE
- NOC: United Arab Emirates National Olympic Committee

in Doha
- Medals Ranked 5th: Gold 7 Silver 9 Bronze 6 Total 22

West Asian Games appearances
- 2002; 2005

The United Arab Emirates participated in the 3rd West Asian Games held in Doha, Qatar from December 1, 2005, to December 10, 2005. The United Arab Emirates ranked 5th with 7 gold medals in this edition of the West Asian Games.
