= Syria at the 2005 West Asian Games =

- IOC code: SYR
- NOC: Syrian Olympic Committee

in Doha
- Medals Ranked 3rd: Gold 21 Silver 14 Bronze 16 Total 51

West Asian Games appearances
- 1997; 2002; 2005

Syria participated in the 2005 West Asian Games held in Doha, Qatar from December 1, 2005 to December 10, 2005. Syria ranked 3rd with 21 gold medals in this edition of the West Asian Games.
