= Jordan at the 2005 West Asian Games =

- IOC code: JOR
- NOC: Jordan Olympic Committee

in Doha
- Medals Ranked 8th: Gold 3 Silver 12 Bronze 10 Total 25

West Asian Games appearances
- 1997; 2002; 2005

Jordan participated in the 3rd West Asian Games held in Doha, Qatar from December 1, 2005 to December 10, 2005. Jordan ranked 8th with 3 gold medals and 11 silver medals in this edition of the West Asian Games.
