= Oman at the 2005 West Asian Games =

- IOC code: OMA
- NOC: Oman Olympic Committee

in Doha
- Medals Ranked 12th: Gold 0 Silver 4 Bronze 6 Total 10

West Asian Games appearances
- 2002; 2005

Oman participated in the 3rd West Asian Games held in Doha, Qatar from December 1, 2005 to December 10, 2005. Oman ranked 12th with 4 silver medals and 6 bronze medals in this edition of the West Asian Games.
