= Saudi Arabia at the 2005 West Asian Games =

- IOC code: KSA
- NOC: Saudi Arabian Olympic Committee

in Doha
- Medals Ranked 6th: Gold 4 Silver 9 Bronze 12 Total 25

West Asian Games appearances
- 2002; 2005

Saudi Arabia participated in the 3rd West Asian Games held in Doha, Qatar from December 1, 2005 to December 10, 2005. Saudi Arabia ranked 6th with 4 gold medals and 9 silver medals in this edition of the West Asian Games.

== Football ==
Saudi Arabia was drawn into the Group B along with Iraq and Kazakhstan. Iraq qualified as Group B winner. Saudi Arabia, being runners-up in the Group B, qualified for the semifinals by winning the toss held between Qatar and Saudi Arabia to decide the "best" runners-up. In the semifinals, Saudi Arabia lost to Iraq and ranked 4th in this event.

=== Group B matches ===
December 3, 2005

Saudi Arabia	2–0	Palestine
Ahmed Al-Swaileh 18'; Essa Al-Mehyani 22'

Ahmed bin Ali Stadium, Ar Rayyan
Referee: Enezi (Kuwait)

December 5, 2005

Iraq	5–1	Saudi Arabia
Haidar Abdul-Amir 8'; Emad Mohammed 19'; Nashat Akram 30'; Younis Mahmoud 51' 78'		Naif Al-Qadi 53'

Ahmed bin Ali Stadium, Ar Rayyan
Referee: Al-Hilali (Oman)

==== Table ====
Team	Pld	W	D	L	GF	GA	GD	Pts
Iraq	2	2	0	0	9	1	+8	6
Saudi Arabia	2	1	0	1	3	5	−2	3
Palestine	2	0	0	2	0	6	−6	0

=== Semifinals ===
December 8, 2005

Iraq	2–0	Saudi Arabia
Luay Salah 33'; Razzaq Farhan 85'

=== Third Place Match ===
December 10, 2005

Iran	2–1	Saudi Arabia
Arash Borhani 2' 4'		Sahib Jassim Al-Abdullah 8'
