= Kuwait at the 2005 West Asian Games =

- IOC code: KUW
- NOC: Kuwait Olympic Committee

in Doha
- Medals Ranked 2nd: Gold 25 Silver 15 Bronze 16 Total 56

West Asian Games appearances
- 1997; 2002; 2005

Kuwait participated in the 3rd West Asian Games held in Doha, Qatar from December 1, 2005 to December 10, 2005. Kuwait ranked 2nd with 25 gold medals in this edition of the West Asian Games.
