= Qatar at the 2005 West Asian Games =

- IOC code: QAT
- NOC: Qatar Olympic Committee

in Doha
- Medals Ranked 1st: Gold 28 Silver 19 Bronze 20 Total 67

West Asian Games appearances
- 1997; 2002; 2005

Qatar hosted and participated in the 3rd West Asian Games held in Doha from December 1, 2005 to December 10, 2005. Qatar ranked 1st with 28 gold medals in this edition of the West Asian Games.
