= West Asian Games =

Multi-sport event held every four years

- Abbreviation: WAG
- Frequency: Every 4 years
- Inaugurated: 1997 West Asian Games in Tehran, Iran
- Most recent: 2005 West Asian Games in Doha, Qatar

The West Asian Games (abbreviated as the WAG) is a multi-sport event held among the athletes from West Asia.

The West Asian Games was first organised in Tehran, Iran and was considered as the first of its kind. The success of the Games led to the creation of the West Asian Games Federation (WAGF) and the intention of hosting the Games every four years. At present, the WAGF comprises 12 member countries, namely Bahrain, Iraq, Jordan, Kuwait, Lebanon, Oman, Palestine, Qatar, Saudi Arabia, Syria, the United Arab Emirates and Yemen.

The West Asian Games is one of the five subregional Games of the Olympic Council of Asia (OCA). The others are the Central Asian Games, the East Asian Youth Games, the South Asian Games, and the Southeast Asian Games.

The fourth edition of the West Asian Games was scheduled to take place in Iran in 2014, but was then postponed to 2016. It was eventually cancelled after Iran moved its athletics region from West Asia to Central Asia in September 2015.

== Editions ==
Edition	Year	Host city	Host nation	Start Date	End Date	Nations	Athletes	Sports	Events	Top Placed Team
I	1997	Tehran	Iran	19 November	28 November	10	850	11	134	Iran (IRI)
II	2002	Kuwait City	Kuwait	3 April	12 April	12	970	9	70	Kuwait (KUW)
III	2005	Doha	Qatar	1 December	10 December	13	1,200	11	118	Qatar (QAT)

== Medal table ==
Rank	Nation	Gold	Silver	Bronze	Total
1	Iran (IRI)	92	73	88	253
2	Kuwait (KUW)	71	59	56	186
3	Syria (SYR)	44	46	49	139
4	Qatar (QAT)	37	33	34	104
5	Kyrgyzstan (KGZ)	26	15	16	57
6	Saudi Arabia (KSA)	15	16	21	52
7	Jordan (JOR)	7	17	20	44
8	United Arab Emirates (UAE)	7	10	10	27
9	Lebanon (LBN)	7	9	10	26
10	Turkmenistan (TKM)	5	13	30	48
11	Tajikistan (TJK)	3	11	19	33
12	Bahrain (BRN)	3	2	4	9
13	Yemen (YEM)	3	1	3	7
14	Iraq (IRQ)	2	1	7	10
15	Oman (OMA)	0	5	6	11
Totals (15 entries)		322	311	373	1,006

== Sports ==
- Aquatics
  - Diving ()
  - Swimming ()
- Athletics ()
- Badminton ()
- Basketball ()
- Bowling ()
- Fencing ()
- Football ()
- Gymnastics ()
- Handball ()
- Judo ()
- Karate ()
- Shooting ()
- Taekwondo ()
- Volleyball ()
- Wrestling ()
- Weightlifting ()

=== Basketball ===
Year	Hosts	Final Standing			
Year	Hosts	Winners	Runners-up	3rd Place	4th Place
1997	(Iran); Tehran	Iran	Turkmenistan	Fath Club	Iran U18
2002	Kuwait City	Kuwait	Qatar	Syria	United Arab Emirates
2005	(Qatar); Doha	Qatar	Syria	Jordan	Kuwait

=== Football ===
Year	Hosts	Final Standing			
Year	Hosts	Winners	Runners-up	3rd Place	4th Place
1997; Details	(Iran); Tehran	Iran	Syria	Kuwait	Tajikistan
2002; Details	Kuwait City	Kuwait	Iran	Syria	Palestine
2005; Details	(Qatar); Doha	Iraq	Syria	Iran	Saudi Arabia

=== Handball ===
Year	Hosts	Final Standing			
Year	Hosts	Winners	Runners-up	3rd Place	4th Place
2002; Details	Kuwait City	Kuwait	Syria	United Arab Emirates	Iran
2005; Details	(Qatar); Doha	Kuwait	Iran	Saudi Arabia	Syria

=== Volleyball ===
Year	Hosts	Final Standing			
Year	Hosts	Winners	Runners-up	3rd Place	4th Place
2005	(Qatar); Doha	Qatar	Iran	Bahrain	Kuwait

== See also ==
- Events of the OCA (Continental)
  - Asian Games
  - Asian Winter Games
  - Asian Youth Games
  - Asian Beach Games
  - Asian Indoor and Martial Arts Games
- Events of the OCA (Subregional)
  - Central Asian Games
  - East Asian Games (now defunct)
  - East Asian Youth Games
  - South Asian Games
  - Southeast Asian Games
- Events of the APC (Continental)
  - Asian Para Games
  - Asian Winter Para Games
  - Asian Youth Para Games
  - Asian Youth Winter Para Games
- Events of the APC (Subregional)
  - ASEAN Para Games
