= 2005 West Asian Games =

Asian Games

3rd West Asian Games
- Host city: Doha, Qatar
- Nations: 13
- Athletes: 1200
- Events: 117 in 11 sports
- Opening: 1 December
- Closing: 10 December
- Opened by: Hamad bin Khalifa Al Thani
- Main venue: Suheim bin Hamad Stadium

The 3rd West Asian Games were to be held from 7 to 17 April 2003 in Damascus, Syria. However, they were postponed and then cancelled. On 4 April 2002 the West Asian Games Federation decided that the Games would be held every four years, instead of two, namely one year before the Asian Games.

The Third West Asian Games was held from the 1 to 10 December 2005 in Doha, Qatar as test event for the 2006 Asian Games and involved over 1,200 athletes from 13 nations participating in 11 sports. Women participated in the West Asian Games for the first time.

== Venues ==
- Qatar SC - Opening and closing ceremonies, Football, Basketball
- Hamad Aquatic Centre - Aquatics (Swimming and Diving)
- Khalifa International Stadium - Athletics
- Qatar Bowling Centre - Bowling
- Al-Arabi Sports Club - Gymnastics and Fencing
- Al-Gharrafa Sports Club - Football, Handball
- Al-Rayyan Sports Club - Football, Volleyball
- Al-Duhail Shooting Range - Shooting
- Al-Sadd Sports Club - Weightlifting

== Sports ==
- Aquatics
  - Diving (5)
  - Swimming (29)
- Athletics (28)
- Basketball (1)
- Bowling (8)
- Fencing (3)
- Football (1)
- Gymnastics (8)
- Handball (1)
- Shooting (24)
- Volleyball (1)
- Weightlifting (8)

== Participating nations ==
- Bahrain
- Iran
- Iraq
- Jordan
- Kuwait
- Lebanon
- Oman
- Palestine
- Qatar
- Saudi Arabia
- Syria
- United Arab Emirates
- Yemen

== Medal table ==
* Host nation (Qatar)

Rank	Nation	Gold	Silver	Bronze	Total
1	Qatar (QAT)*	28	19	20	67
2	Kuwait (KUW)	25	15	18	58
3	Iran (IRI)	20	25	16	61
4	Syria (SYR)	20	13	17	50
5	United Arab Emirates (UAE)	7	9	6	22
6	Saudi Arabia (KSA)	4	9	13	26
7	Lebanon (LIB)	4	4	3	11
8	Jordan (JOR)	3	12	10	25
9	Bahrain (BRN)	3	2	2	7
10	Iraq (IRQ)	2	1	7	10
11	Yemen (YEM)	2	1	0	3
12	Oman (OMA)	0	5	5	10
Totals (12 entries)		118	115	117	350

=== Changes in medal standings ===
Four players who took part in the third West Asian Games have tested positive for taking steroids.

Sport	Event	Nation	Gold	Silver	Bronze	Total
Athletics	Men's 3000 m steeplechase	Iraq			–1	–1
Athletics	Men's 3000 m steeplechase	Saudi Arabia			+1	+1
Athletics	Women's 200 m	Syria		–1		–1
Athletics	Women's 200 m	Jordan		+1	–1	0
Athletics	Women's 200 m	Iraq			+1	+1
Athletics	Women's 4×100 m relay	Syria	–1			–1
Athletics	Women's 4×100 m relay	Iran	+1	–1		0
Athletics	Women's 4×100 m relay	Oman		+1	–1	0
Athletics	Women's 4×100 m relay	Kuwait			+1	+1
Swimming	Men's 100 m butterfly	Iran			–1	–1
Swimming	Men's 100 m butterfly	Kuwait			+1	+1
Swimming	Men's 200 m butterfly	Iran			–1	–1
Swimming	Men's 200 m butterfly	Syria			+1	+1

== See also ==
- 2006 Asian Games
- 2011 Pan Arab Games
