= 2019 World Men's Handball Championship squads =

This article displays the squads for the 2019 World Men's Handball Championship. Each team consisted of 16 players.

Age, club, appearances and goals correct as of 10 January 2019.

== Group A ==
=== Brazil ===
A 28-player squad was announced on 10 December 2018. A 20-player squad was revealed on 16 December 2018. The final squad was announced on 3 January 2019.

Head coach: Washington Nunes

No.	Pos.	Name	Date of birth (age)	Height	App.	Goals	Club
2	CB	Henrique Teixeira	27 February 1989 (aged 29)	1.92 m	112	172	(Romania) CSM București
7	LB	Guilherme Valadão Gama	25 January 1991 (aged 27)	1.94 m	60	176	(Brazil) HC Taubaté
10	RB	José Toledo	11 January 1994 (aged 24)	1.93 m	82	216	(Poland) Wisła Płock
14	LB	Thiagus dos Santos	25 January 1989 (aged 29)	1.98 m	131	228	(Spain) FC Barcelona
17	P	Alexandro Pozzer	21 December 1988 (aged 30)	1.92 m	100	148	(Romania) CSM București
18	LW	Felipe Borges	14 May 1985 (aged 33)	1.88 m	210	730	(France) Tremblay
19	RW	Fábio Chiuffa	10 March 1989 (aged 29)	1.87 m	138	352	(Portugal) Sporting CP
25	P	Vinícius Teixeira	3 April 1988 (aged 30)	1.89 m	135	540	(Brazil) HC Taubaté
32	LW	Cleryston Novais	15 October 1992 (aged 26)	1.80 m	22	34	(Turkey) Beykoz Belediyespor
35	LB	Thiago Ponciano	8 May 1994 (aged 24)	1.93 m	27	20	(Spain) Ciudad Encantada
37	LB	Haniel Langaro	7 March 1995 (aged 23)	1.98 m	60	284	(France) Dunkerque
49	LB	Raul Nantes	20 March 1990 (aged 28)	1.95 m	70	250	(Spain) Helvetia Anaitasuna
62	GK	Leonardo Terçariol	14 April 1987 (aged 31)	1.94 m	35	1	(Spain) BM Benidorm
77	RW	Rudolph Hackbarth	10 March 1994 (aged 24)	1.89 m	19	262	(Brazil) EC Pinheiros
89	GK	César Almeida	6 January 1989 (aged 30)	1.87 m	90	4	(Spain) BM Granollers
95	RB	Gustavo Rodrigues	9 April 1995 (aged 23)	1.90 m	20	70	(France) US Créteil Handball

=== France ===
A 20-player squad was revealed on 10 December 2018. The final squad was revealed on 8 January 2019.

Head coach: Didier Dinart

No.	Pos.	Name	Date of birth (age)	Height	App.	Goals	Club
1	GK	Cyril Dumoulin	2 February 1984 (aged 34)	1.99 m	78	0	(France) HBC Nantes
5	RB	Nedim Remili	18 July 1995 (aged 23)	1.95 m	46	133	(France) Paris Saint-Germain
7	LB	Romain Lagarde	5 March 1997 (aged 21)	1.94 m	16	15	(France) HBC Nantes
9	CB	Melvyn Richardson	30 January 1997 (aged 21)	1.90 m	7	16	(France) Montpellier
10	RB	Dika Mem	31 August 1997 (aged 21)	1.94 m	28	64	(Spain) FC Barcelona
12	GK	Vincent Gérard	16 December 1986 (aged 32)	1.89 m	74	7	(France) Montpellier
13	CB	Nikola Karabatić	11 April 1984 (aged 34)	1.96 m	299	1181	(France) Paris Saint-Germain
14	LW/CB	Kentin Mahé	22 May 1991 (aged 27)	1.86 m	92	302	(Hungary) Telekom Veszprém
15	LW	Mathieu Grébille	6 October 1991 (aged 27)	1.98 m	53	79	(France) Montpellier
17	LB	Timothey N'Guessan	18 September 1992 (aged 26)	1.96 m	64	118	(Spain) FC Barcelona
19	RW	Luc Abalo	6 September 1984 (aged 34)	1.82 m	243	759	(France) Paris Saint-Germain
20	P	Cédric Sorhaindo	7 June 1984 (aged 34)	1.92 m	202	414	(Spain) FC Barcelona
21	LW	Michaël Guigou	28 January 1982 (aged 36)	1.80 m	260	902	(France) Montpellier
22	P	Luka Karabatic	19 April 1988 (aged 30)	2.02 m	84	96	(France) Paris Saint-Germain
23	P	Ludovic Fabregas	1 July 1996 (aged 22)	1.98 m	50	68	(Spain) FC Barcelona
26	CB	Nicolas Claire	10 July 1987 (aged 31)	1.90 m	33	37	(France) HBC Nantes
27	RB	Adrien Dipanda	3 May 1988 (aged 30)	2.02 m	56	84	(France) Saint-Raphaël Var Handball
28	RB/RW	Valentin Porte	7 September 1990 (aged 28)	1.90 m	100	264	(France) Montpellier HB

=== Germany ===
A 28-player squad was announced on 10 December 2018. A 18-player squad was revealed on 21 December 2018. The final squad was revealed on 6 January, Tobias Reichmann and Tim Suton were excluded from the squad.

Head coach: Christian Prokop

No.	Pos.	Name	Date of birth (age)	Height	App.	Goals	Club
3	LW	Uwe Gensheimer	26 October 1986 (aged 32)	1.88 m	160	753	(France) Paris Saint-Germain
6	LB	Finn Lemke	30 April 1992 (aged 26)	2.10 m	66	25	(Germany) MT Melsungen
7	P	Patrick Wiencek	22 March 1989 (aged 29)	2.01 m	123	276	(Germany) THW Kiel
8	CB	Tim Suton	8 May 1996 (aged 22)	1.91 m	7	12	(Germany) TBV Lemgo
10	RB	Fabian Wiede	8 February 1994 (aged 24)	1.94 m	65	121	(Germany) Füchse Berlin
12	GK	Silvio Heinevetter	21 October 1984 (aged 34)	1.94 m	180	2	(Germany) Füchse Berlin
13	P	Hendrik Pekeler	2 July 1991 (aged 27)	2.03 m	85	135	(Germany) THW Kiel
17	RB	Steffen Weinhold	19 July 1986 (aged 32)	1.91 m	114	283	(Germany) THW Kiel
19	CB	Martin Strobel	5 June 1986 (aged 32)	1.89 m	140	160	(Germany) HBW Balingen-Weilstetten
23	LB	Steffen Fäth	4 April 1990 (aged 28)	1.95 m	67	143	(Germany) Rhein-Neckar Löwen
24	RW	Patrick Groetzki	4 July 1989 (aged 29)	1.89 m	133	352	(Germany) Rhein-Neckar Löwen
25	RB	Kai Häfner	10 July 1989 (aged 29)	1.92 m	68	149	(Germany) TSV Hannover-Burgdorf
32	RB	Franz Semper	5 July 1997 (aged 21)	1.90 m	5	12	(Germany) SC DHfK Leipzig
33	GK	Andreas Wolff	3 March 1991 (aged 27)	1.98 m	73	9	(Germany) THW Kiel
37	LW	Matthias Musche	18 July 1992 (aged 26)	1.86 m	31	54	(Germany) SC Magdeburg
38	LB	Fabian Böhm	24 June 1989 (aged 29)	1.98 m	16	43	(Germany) TSV Hannover-Burgdorf
48	P	Jannik Kohlbacher	19 July 1995 (aged 23)	1.93 m	50	96	(Germany) Rhein-Neckar Löwen
95	CB	Paul Drux	7 February 1995 (aged 23)	1.92 m	66	128	(Germany) Füchse Berlin

=== Korea ===
A 28-player squad was announced on 10 December 2018. The final team was announced on 18 December 2018, with sixteen players from South Korea and four North Korean players joined the team on 22 December 2018 and formed a single team with a total of 20 players.

Head coach: Cho Young-shin

No.	Pos.	Name	Date of birth (age)	Height	App.	Goals	Club
1	GK	Park Jae-yong	20 March 1997 (aged 21)	1.91 m	3		(South Korea) Korea National Sport University
2	CB	Ri Kyong-song	6 November 1997 (aged 21)	1.78 m			(North Korea)
3	LB	Pak Jong-gon	25 March 2000 (aged 18)	1.79 m			(North Korea)
5	CB	Choi Beom-mun	1 February 1996 (aged 22)	1.80 m	6		(South Korea) Chungnam Sports Council
7	RB	Jung Su-young	17 October 1985 (aged 33)	1.85 m	25		(South Korea) Hanam Handball Club
9	RB	Jo Tae-hun	30 June 1991 (aged 27)	1.83 m	6		(South Korea) Doosan
10	LB	Park Young-jun	28 January 1994 (aged 24)	1.88 m	5		(South Korea) Korea Armed Forces Athletic Corps
11	LW	Jang Dong-hyun	13 January 1995 (aged 23)	1.80 m	11		(South Korea) SK Hawks
13	RW	Park Dong-kwang	14 April 1996 (aged 22)	1.82 m	8		(South Korea) Hanam Sports Council
14	LB	Ri Song-jin	11 August 1989 (aged 29)	1.78 m			(North Korea)
15	P	Kim Dong-myung	5 August 1985 (aged 33)	1.95 m	5		(South Korea) Doosan
17	RW	Na Seung-do	27 January 1990 (aged 28)	1.95 m	13		(South Korea) Doosan
20	CB	Kang Tan	22 September 1999 (aged 19)	1.86 m	2		(South Korea) Korea National Sport University
22	LW	Seo Seung-hyun	24 March 1991 (aged 27)	1.78 m	2		(South Korea) Hanam Handball Club
23	LB	Park Kwang-soon	6 May 1996 (aged 22)	1.87 m	6		(South Korea) Hanam Sports Council
24	RB	Ri Yong-myong	27 July 1998 (aged 20)	1.85 m			(North Korea)
34	CB	Kang Jeong-gu	11 May 1990 (aged 28)	1.79 m	6		(South Korea) Doosan
52	P	Jeong Jae-wan	1 September 1996 (aged 22)	1.88 m	6		(South Korea) Hanam Sports Council
88	P	Ku Change-un	30 June 1991 (aged 27)	1.90 m	10		(South Korea) Doosan
94	GK	Ji Hyung-jin	25 May 1994 (aged 24)	1.82 m	4		(South Korea) Kyung Hee University

=== Russia ===
A 28-player squad was announced on 10 December 2018. A 21-player squad was revealed on 24 December 2018. On 3 January the squad was reduced to 19 players. The final squad was announced on 9 January 2019.

Head coach: Eduard Koksharov

No.	Pos.	Name	Date of birth (age)	Height	App.	Goals	Club
1	GK	Oleg Grams	20 February 1984 (aged 34)	2.00 m	139	0	(France) Dunkerque
5	RB	Dmitrii Kiselev	15 January 1994 (aged 24)	1.94 m	31	78	(North Macedonia) RK Vardar
6	RW	Daniil Shishkarev	6 July 1988 (aged 30)	1.91 m	111	280	(North Macedonia) RK Vardar
7	RW	Dmitry Kovalyov	15 May 1982 (aged 36)	1.80 m	201	530	(Russia) HC Spartak
8	P	Yegor Yevdokimov	9 March 1982 (aged 36)	2.03 m	132	179	(Russia) HC Spartak
9	LB	Alexander Shkurinskiy	11 April 1995 (aged 23)	1.93 m	29	47	(Belarus) Meshkov Brest
16	GK	Dmitry Pavlenko	1 January 1991 (aged 28)	1.93 m	30	0	(Russia) Chekhovskiye Medvedi
17	LB	Aleksandr Dereven	26 March 1992 (aged 26)	1.98 m	23	55	(Russia) HC Spartak
18	P	Sergej Gorpishin	31 August 1997 (aged 21)	2.00 m	4	3	(Germany) HC Erlangen
21	P	Gleb Kalarash	29 November 1990 (aged 28)	2.05 m	53	81	(North Macedonia) RK Vardar
23	LW	Roman Ostrashchenko	26 September 1992 (aged 26)	1.88 m	19	15	(Russia) Chekhovskiye Medvedi
31	LW	Timur Dibirov	30 July 1983 (aged 35)	1.80 m	199	684	(North Macedonia) RK Vardar
34	LB	Vitaly Komogorov	28 August 1991 (aged 27)	1.96 m	15	13	(Romania) CS Dinamo București
43	P	Maksim Mikhalin	3 September 1997 (aged 21)	2.07 m	9	4	(Russia) SKIF Krasnodar
87	GK	Victor Kireev	5 May 1987 (aged 31)	1.90 m	48	0	(Ukraine) Motor Zaporizhzhia
89	CB	Dmitry Zhitnikov	20 November 1989 (aged 29)	1.97 m	112	270	(Hungary) MOL-Pick Szeged
97	RW	Aleksei Fokin	29 August 1997 (aged 21)	1.85 m	0	0	(Russia) HC Kaustik
99	LB	Sergei Kosorotov	16 June 1999 (aged 19)	1.99 m	2	3	(Russia) Chekhovskiye Medvedi

=== Serbia ===
A 28-player squad was announced on 10 December 2018. A 21-player squad was revealed on 31 December 2018. The final squad was revealed on 8 January 2019. Nemanja Zelenović and Vladimir Cupara were replaced by Milan Milić and Dejan Milosavljev on 14 January 2019.

Head coach: Nenad Peruničić

No.	Pos.	Name	Date of birth (age)	Height	App.	Goals	Club
2	LB	Miljan Pušica	30 June 1991 (aged 27)	2.00 m	26	53	(Germany) GWD Minden
3	RW	Vukašin Vorkapić	1 October 1997 (aged 21)	1.84 m	12	26	(Serbia) RK Metaloplastika
4	LW	Dobrivoje Marković	22 April 1986 (aged 32)	1.88 m	110	223	(Serbia) Železničar 1949
5	LB	Žarko Šešum	16 June 1986 (aged 32)	1.96 m	139	370	(Switzerland) Kadetten Schaffhausen
6	RB	Miloš Orbović	2 November 1993 (aged 25)	1.96 m	10	18	(Romania) SCM Politehnica Timișoara
7	CB	Stefan Vujić	6 July 1991 (aged 27)	1.92 m	16	23	(Romania) Steaua București
10	RW	Darko Ðukić	11 December 1994 (aged 24)	1.91 m	36	108	(Poland) PGE Vive Kielce
11	P	Bojan Beljanski	22 June 1986 (aged 32)	2.02 m	66	63	(Switzerland) Kadetten Schaffhausen
12	GK	Svetislav Verkić	11 June 1981 (aged 37)	1.89 m	9	0	(Serbia) RK Vojvodina
13	CB	Petar Nenadić	28 June 1986 (aged 32)	1.98 m	78	213	(Hungary) Telekom Veszprém
14	RW	Bogdan Radivojević	2 March 1993 (aged 25)	1.86 m	39	72	(Germany) Rhein-Neckar Löwen
15	LB	Draško Nenadić	15 February 1990 (aged 28)	2.03 m	25	26	(Slovenia) RK Celje
19	LW	Nemanja Ilić	11 May 1990 (aged 28)	1.77 m	59	159	(France) Fenix Toulouse
20	LB	Ivan Mošić	23 December 1994 (aged 24)	1.96 m	4	11	(Spain) CB Ademar León
21	LW	Vanja Ilić	25 February 1995 (aged 23)	1.86 m	14	29	(Spain) BM Logroño La Rioja
23	P	Zoran Nikolić	9 March 1993 (aged 25)	1.90 m	9	23	(Romania) HC Dobrogea Sud Constanța
24	CB	Lazar Kukić	12 December 1995 (aged 23)	1.87 m	4	11	(Spain) BM Logroño La Rioja
25	RB	Nemanja Zelenović	27 February 1990 (aged 28)	1.94 m	57	189	(Germany) Frisch Auf Göppingen
29	RB	Milan Milić	14 May 1998 (aged 20)	1.99 m	8	23	(Serbia) RK Metaloplastika
33	P	Mijajlo Marsenić	9 March 1993 (aged 25)	2.03 m	71	122	(Germany) Füchse Berlin
35	LB	Darko Stevanović	3 January 1997 (aged 22)	1.96 m	5	5	(Serbia) RK Partizan
41	RB	Marko Vujin	7 December 1984 (aged 34)	1.99 m	126	489	(Germany) THW Kiel
42	CB	Nemanja Obradović	8 January 1991 (aged 28)	2.00 m	13	25	(Poland) Wisła Płock
76	GK	Vladimir Cupara	19 February 1994 (aged 24)	1.99 m	29	0	(Poland) PGE Vive Kielce
96	GK	Dejan Milosavljev	16 March 1996 (aged 22)	1.96 m	15	0	(North Macedonia) RK Vardar

== Group B ==
=== Bahrain ===
A 18-player squad was announced on 27 December 2018. On 7 January, Ali Abdulqader was excluded from the squad due to an injury.

Head coach: (Iceland) Aron Kristjánsson

No.	Pos.	Name	Date of birth (age)	Height	App.	Goals	Club
1	GK	Husain Mahfoodh	29 June 2001 (aged 17)	1.75 m	10	1	(Bahrain) Tobli
7	RB	Ali Merza	7 July 1988 (aged 30)	1.84 m	80	350	(Bahrain) Al-Najma
9	RW	Hasan Al-Samahiji	22 February 1991 (aged 27)	1.77 m	40	160	(Bahrain) Al-Ahli
15	LB	Mohamed Abdulredha	27 September 1989 (aged 29)	1.86 m	35	70	(Bahrain) Al-Dair
17	CB	Ahmed Husain	11 January 1999 (aged 19)	1.80 m	30	90	(Bahrain) Al-Tadhamun
18	LW	Ahmed Jalal	31 January 1998 (aged 20)	1.68 m	25	61	(Bahrain) Al-Shabab
19	P	Mohamed Merza	17 April 1987 (aged 31)	1.84 m	40	120	(Bahrain) Al-Najma
21	GK	Mohamed Abdulhusain	12 August 1989 (aged 29)	1.87 m	85	25	(Bahrain) Al-Najma
27	RW	Bilal Basham Askani	7 April 1991 (aged 27)	1.74 m	45	135	(Bahrain) Al-Najma
29	LB	Abdulla Yaseen	6 October 1998 (aged 20)	1.80 m	30	120	(Bahrain) Al-Shabab
33	LB	Hasan Madan	29 February 1996 (aged 22)	1.94 m	30	90	(Bahrain) Al-Dair
66	LB	Komail Mahfoodh	28 April 1992 (aged 26)	1.89 m	50	100	(Bahrain) Al-Najma
77	LB	Jasim Al-Salatna	23 March 1989 (aged 29)	1.85 m	80	240	(Bahrain) Al-Ahli
86	GK	Ali Khamis	9 August 1986 (aged 32)	1.92 m	45	5	(Bahrain) Ettifaq
88	P	Hasan Al-Fardan	10 December 1988 (aged 30)	1.70 m	75	300	(Bahrain) Al-Najma
89	LW	Mahdi Saad	15 March 1989 (aged 29)	1.73 m	70	210	(Bahrain) Al-Najma
93	RB	Mohamed Habib	20 July 1993 (aged 25)	1.86 m	85	360	(Bahrain) Barbar
99	CB	Husain Al-Sayyad (c)	14 January 1988 (aged 30)	1.75 m	90	450	(Bahrain) Al-Najma

=== Croatia ===
A 28-player squad was announced on 10 December 2018. A 19-player squad was revealed on 17 December 2018. On 1 January 2019, four players were excluded and five players were added. On 2 January, Josip Božić Pavletić was replaced by Ivan Vida due to an injury. On 5 January Damir Bičanić was added to the squad. On 6 January Filip Ivić and Luka Šebetić were excluded from the squad. The final squad wes announced on 8 January 2019.

Head coach: Lino Červar

No.	Pos.	Name	Date of birth (age)	Height	App.	Goals	Club
1	GK	Ivan Stevanović	18 May 1982 (aged 36)	1.93 m	59	1	(Switzerland) Kadetten Schaffhausen
5	CB	Domagoj Duvnjak	1 June 1988 (aged 30)	1.97 m	190	617	(Germany) THW Kiel
7	RB	Luka Stepančić	20 November 1990 (aged 28)	2.03 m	71	167	(France) Paris Saint Germain
11	RW	Ivan Vida	14 March 1995 (aged 23)	1.86 m	2	3	(Croatia) RK Nexe Našice
13	RW	Zlatko Horvat	25 September 1984 (aged 34)	1.79 m	163	502	(Croatia) RK Zagreb
18	CB	Igor Karačić	2 November 1988 (aged 30)	1.89 m	65	154	(North Macedonia) RK Vardar
21	LB	Alen Blažević	23 September 1986 (aged 32)	1.99 m	14	8	(Hungary) MOL-Pick Szeged
26	LW	Manuel Štrlek	1 December 1988 (aged 30)	1.81 m	151	529	(Hungary) Telekom Veszprém
28	P	Željko Musa	8 January 1986 (aged 33)	2.00 m	109	82	(Germany) SC Magdeburg
29	CB	Lovro Jotić	12 November 1994 (aged 24)	1.91 m	14	12	(Croatia) RK Zagreb
32	LB	Ivan Slišković	23 October 1991 (aged 27)	1.98 m	58	139	(Germany) Frisch Auf Göppingen
33	CB	Luka Cindrić	5 July 1993 (aged 25)	1.82 m	53	130	(Poland) PGE Vive Kielce
39	LW	David Mandić	14 September 1997 (aged 21)	1.87 m	9	36	(Croatia) RK Zagreb
44	P	Krešimir Kozina	25 June 1990 (aged 28)	1.96 m	27	28	(Germany) Frisch Auf Göppingen
47	RB	Jakov Vranković	12 June 1993 (aged 25)	2.00 m	13	24	(Hungary) Tatabánya KC
53	P	Marin Šipić	29 April 1996 (aged 22)	1.90 m	7	16	(Croatia) RK Nexe
55	GK	Marin Šego	2 August 1985 (aged 33)	1.98 m	28	1	(Hungary) MOL-Pick Szeged
56	P	Kristian Bećiri	14 June 1994 (aged 24)	2.02 m	2	0	(Slovenia) RK Celje
77	LB	Damir Bičanić	29 June 1985 (aged 33)	1.94 m	92	165	(Croatia) RK Zagreb

=== Iceland ===
A 28-player squad was announced on 10 December 2018. A 21-player squad was revealed on 20 December 2018. On 1 January the squad was reduced to 17 players. On 9 January the final squad was revealed, Guðjón Valur Sigurðsson was excluded from the squad due to injury and replaced with Bjarki Már Elísson.

Head coach: Guðmundur Guðmundsson

No.	Pos.	Name	Date of birth (age)	Height	App.	Goals	Club
1	GK	Björgvin Páll Gústavsson	24 May 1985 (aged 33)	1.93 m	212	12	(Denmark) Skjern Håndbold
4	LB	Aron Pálmarsson	19 July 1990 (aged 28)	1.93 m	129	500	(Spain) FC Barcelona
8	LW	Bjarki Már Elísson	16 May 1990 (aged 28)	1.91 m	49	106	(Germany) Füchse Berlin
10	LW	Stefán Rafn Sigurmannsson	19 May 1990 (aged 28)	1.96 m	64	83	(Hungary) MOL-Pick Szeged
11	P	Ýmir Örn Gíslason	1 July 1997 (aged 21)	1.92 m	19	9	(Iceland) Valur
13	LB	Ólafur Guðmundsson	13 May 1990 (aged 28)	1.94 m	101	178	(Sweden) IFK Kristianstad
14	RB	Ómar Ingi Magnússon	12 March 1997 (aged 21)	1.84 m	36	101	(Denmark) Aalborg Håndbold
15	LB	Daníel Þór Ingason	15 January 1995 (aged 23)	1.95 m	18	9	(Iceland) Haukar Handball
17	RW	Arnór Þór Gunnarsson	23 October 1987 (aged 31)	1.81 m	95	249	(Germany) Bergischer HC
18	CB	Gísli Þorgeir Kristjánsson	30 July 1999 (aged 19)	1.90 m	13	21	(Germany) THW Kiel
20	GK	Ágúst Elí Björgvinsson	11 April 1995 (aged 23)	1.90 m	18	0	(Sweden) IK Sävehof
21	P	Arnar Freyr Arnarsson	14 March 1996 (aged 22)	2.01 m	34	50	(Sweden) IFK Kristianstad
22	RW	Sigvaldi Guðjónsson	4 July 1994 (aged 24)	1.91 m	6	14	(Norway) Elverum Håndball
23	LB	Ólafur Gústafsson	27 March 1989 (aged 29)	1.98 m	31	46	(Denmark) KIF Kolding København
24	CB	Haukur Þrastarson	14 April 2001 (aged 17)	1.92 m	6	7	(Iceland) Selfoss
25	CB	Elvar Örn Jónsson	31 August 1997 (aged 21)	1.85 m	12	35	(Iceland) Selfoss
28	RW	Óðinn Þór Ríkharðsson	23 October 1997 (aged 21)	1.81 m	11	42	(Denmark) GOG Håndbold
31	RB	Teitur Örn Einarsson	23 September 1998 (aged 20)	1.90 m	4	1	(Sweden) IFK Kristianstad

=== Japan ===
A 21-player squad was revealed on 11 December 2018. The final squad was announced on 17 December 2019. Motoki Sakai was replaced by Ryosuke Sasaki on 26 December.

Head coach: (Iceland) Dagur Sigurðsson

No.	Pos.	Name	Date of birth (age)	Height	App.	Goals	Club
1	GK	Ryosuke Sasaki	6 March 1993 (aged 25)	1.92 m	6	0	(Japan) Toyoda Gosei
7	LW	Daisuke Miyazaki	6 June 1981 (aged 37)	1.73 m	129	582	(Japan) Osaki Osol
10	LW	Naoki Sugioka	18 April 1994 (aged 24)	1.78 m	2	1	(Japan) Toyota Auto Body
13	P	Kenya Kasahara	15 May 1988 (aged 30)	1.96 m	39	23	(Japan) Toyota Auto Body
15	LB	Adam Yuki Baig	12 April 1999 (aged 19)	1.94 m	13	29	(France) Cesson Rennes MHB
16	GK	Akihito Kai	29 April 1987 (aged 31)	1.84 m	77	8	(Japan) Toyota Auto Body
18	LW	Kohei Narita	15 June 1989 (aged 29)	1.90 m	61	103	(Japan) Wakunaga Leolic
19	RB	Shinnosuke Tokuda	6 December 1995 (aged 23)	1.78 m	28	108	(Hungary) Dabas KK
20	RB	Jin Watanabe	17 January 1990 (aged 28)	1.83 m	60	203	(Japan) Toyota Auto Body
21	LW	Remi Anri Doi	28 September 1989 (aged 29)	1.80 m	25	55	(France) Chartres
24	LB	Hiroki Shida	24 June 1989 (aged 29)	1.89 m	70	206	(Japan) Osaki Osol
25	RW	Hiroki Motoki	14 February 1992 (aged 26)	1.82 m	56	146	(Japan) Osaki Osol
26	GK	Yuki Kubo	24 May 1988 (aged 30)	1.86 m	32	0	(Japan) Daido Steel
27	P	Hiroyasu Tamakawa	27 April 1995 (aged 23)	1.98 m	22	21	(Japan) Osaki Osol
29	P	Ryusei Okamoto	1 November 1993 (aged 25)	1.92 m	0	0	(Japan) Toyota Auto Body
31	LB	Tatsuki Yoshino	13 July 1994 (aged 24)	1.82 m	12	37	(Japan) Toyota Auto Body
33	CB	Yuto Agarie	6 July 1993 (aged 25)	1.82 m	36	111	(Japan) Daido Steel
44	CB	Tetsuya Kadoyama	22 October 1983 (aged 35)	1.86 m	113	343	(Japan) Toyota Auto Body

=== Macedonia ===
A 28-player squad was announced on 10 December 2018. A 22-player team was revealed on 22 December 2018. On 30 December 2018 Tomislav Jagurinovski and Lasko Andonovski were excluded and the squad was reduced to 20 players. The final squad was announced on 9 January 2019.

Head coach: (Spain) Raúl González

No.	Pos.	Name	Date of birth (age)	Height	App.	Goals	Club
1	GK	Nikola Mitrevski	3 October 1985 (aged 33)	1.88 m	56	0	(Romania) HC Dobrogea Sud
3	LW	Dejan Manaskov	26 August 1992 (aged 26)	1.80 m	38	117	(Hungary) Telekom Veszprém
5	P	Stojanče Stoilov	30 April 1987 (aged 31)	1.92 m	32	51	(North Macedonia) RK Vardar
7	RB	Kiril Lazarov	10 May 1980 (aged 38)	1.93 m	230	1603	(France) HBC Nantes
10	CB	Filip Čurlevski	22 February 1992 (aged 26)	1.77 m	0	0	(North Macedonia) RK Eurofarm Rabotnik
11	LB	Filip Taleski	28 March 1996 (aged 22)	2.00 m	19	48	(Germany) Rhein-Neckar Löwen
14	LB	Velko Markoski	5 April 1986 (aged 32)	1.94 m	44	8	(Romania) HC Dobrogea Sud
16	GK	Borko Ristovski	2 November 1982 (aged 36)	1.90 m	118	3	(Portugal) S.L. Benfica
18	LB	Filip Kuzmanovski	3 July 1996 (aged 22)	1.98 m	11	31	(North Macedonia) RK Eurofarm Rabotnik
21	LB	Mario Tankoski	28 August 1998 (aged 20)	1.92 m	0	0	(North Macedonia) RK Metalurg Skopje
22	RW	Goce Georgievski	12 February 1987 (aged 31)	1.85 m	64	170	(Romania) CSM București
23	LB	Filip Lazarov	21 April 1985 (aged 33)	1.97 m	47	133	(Germany) SG Ratingen 2011
24	GK	Zlatko Daskalovski	8 December 1984 (aged 34)	1.93 m	5	0	(France) Strasbourg
25	CB	Goran Krstevski	29 March 1996 (aged 22)	1.96 m	0	0	(North Macedonia) RK Eurofarm Rabotnik
28	RW	Martin Popovski	26 August 1994 (aged 24)	1.77 m	4	2	(North Macedonia) RK Vardar
33	P	Žarko Peševski	11 April 1991 (aged 27)	1.95 m	11	17	(Ukraine) HC Motor Zaporizhzhia
37	P	Milan Lazarevski	9 February 1997 (aged 21)	1.94 m	0	0	(North Macedonia) RK Metalurg Skopje
77	RB	Martin Serafimov	3 March 2000 (aged 18)	1.90 m	0	0	(North Macedonia) RK Metalurg Skopje

=== Spain ===
A 19-player squad was announced on 17 December 2018. On 29 December 2018, Abel Serdio and Sergey Hernández were discarded from the squad.

Head coach: Jordi Ribera

No.	Pos.	Name	Date of birth (age)	Height	App.	Goals	Club
3	RB	Eduardo Gurbindo	8 November 1987 (aged 31)	1.95 m	112	160	(France) HBC Nantes
6	LW	Ángel Fernández	16 September 1988 (aged 30)	1.92 m	35	100	(Poland) PGE Vive Kielce
9	CB	Raúl Entrerríos	12 February 1981 (aged 37)	1.95 m	241	528	(Spain) FC Barcelona
10	RB	Alex Dujshebaev	17 December 1992 (aged 26)	1.87 m	71	176	(Poland) PGE Vive Kielce
11	CB	Daniel Sarmiento	25 August 1983 (aged 35)	1.86 m	98	210	(France) Saint-Raphaël
13	P	Julen Aguinagalde	8 December 1982 (aged 36)	1.95 m	172	434	(Poland) PGE Vive Kielce
16	GK	Arpad Šterbik	20 November 1979 (aged 39)	2.00 m	77	0	(Hungary) Telekom Veszprém
21	LB	Joan Cañellas	30 September 1986 (aged 32)	1.98 m	160	416	(Hungary) MOL-Pick Szeged
24	LB	Viran Morros	15 December 1983 (aged 35)	1.99 m	202	157	(France) Paris Saint-Germain
28	RW	Aleix Gómez	7 May 1997 (aged 21)	1.80 m	8	25	(Spain) FC Barcelona
29	LW	Aitor Ariño	5 October 1992 (aged 26)	1.87 m	32	69	(Spain) FC Barcelona
30	P	Gedeón Guardiola	1 October 1984 (aged 34)	2.00 m	12	149	(Germany) Rhein-Neckar Löwen
31	LB	Iosu Goñi Leoz	4 January 1990 (aged 29)	1.95 m	43	69	(France) Pays d'Aix Université Club
33	GK	Gonzalo Pérez de Vargas	10 January 1991 (aged 28)	1.90 m	85	5	(Spain) FC Barcelona
44	GK	Rodrigo Corrales	24 January 1991 (aged 27)	2.02 m	45	1	(France) Paris Saint-Germain
49	RW	Ferrán Solé	25 August 1992 (aged 26)	1.78 m	20	81	(France) Fenix Toulouse
55	P	Adrià Figueras	31 August 1988 (aged 30)	1.92 m	36	83	(Spain) BM Granollers
59	LB	Daniel Dujshebaev	4 July 1997 (aged 21)	1.97 m	23	38	(Poland) PGE Vive Kielce

== Group C ==
=== Austria ===
A 28-player squad was announced on 10 December 2018. A 18-player squad was revealed on 27 December 2018. On 6 January, Alexander Hermann was excluded from the squad due to an injury.

Head coach: (Iceland) Patrekur Jóhannesson

No.	Pos.	Name	Date of birth (age)	Height	App.	Goals	Club
1	GK	Thomas Bauer	24 January 1986 (aged 32)	1.90 m	139	0	(Portugal) FC Porto
4	RB	Maximilian Hermann	10 December 1991 (aged 27)	1.94 m	48	103	(Austria) Alpla HC Hard
6	CB	Dominik Schmid	7 September 1989 (aged 29)	1.93 m	53	70	(Austria) Alpla HC Hard
7	RB	Janko Božović	14 July 1985 (aged 33)	2.04 m	133	339	(Germany) TV Emsdetten
8	CB	Sebastian Spendier	17 December 1996 (aged 22)	1.89 m	2	0	(Austria) Handball Tirol
12	GK	Nikola Marinovic	29 August 1976 (aged 42)	1.98 m	165	0	(Switzerland) Kadetten Schaffhausen
13	LB	Frederic Wüstner	7 September 1992 (aged 26)	1.91 m	4	0	(Switzerland) TSV St. Otmar St. Gallen
20	LW	Sebastian Frimmel	18 December 1995 (aged 23)	1.90 m	40	81	(Switzerland) Kadetten Schaffhausen
27	RW	Marian Klopcic	14 January 1992 (aged 26)	1.84 m	40	37	(Austria) Bregenz
28	RW	Robert Weber	25 November 1985 (aged 33)	1.79 m	160	699	(Germany) SC Magdeburg
30	RB	Boris Zivkovic	2 May 1992 (aged 26)	1.95 m	10	12	(Austria) Alpla HC Hard
32	CB	Gerald Zeiner	28 June 1988 (aged 30)	1.90 m	34	74	(Austria) Alpla HC Hard
45	LB	Daniel Dicker	5 June 1995 (aged 23)	1.98 m	0	0	(Austria) HSG Graz
53	CB	Nikola Bilyk	28 November 1996 (aged 22)	1.98 m	53	202	(Germany) THW Kiel
55	P	Tobias Wagner	26 March 1995 (aged 23)	1.98 m	32	58	(Austria) Fivers Margareten
56	GK	Kristian Pilipovic	10 December 1994 (aged 24)	1.90 m	23	0	(Switzerland) Kadetten Schaffhausen
85	P	Lukas Herburger	19 December 1994 (aged 24)	1.97 m	11	6	(Switzerland) Kadetten Schaffhausen
92	LW	Raul Santos	1 June 1992 (aged 26)	1.80 m	72	287	(Germany) SC DHfK Leipzig
95	LB	Romas Kirveliavičius	5 March 1988 (aged 30)	2.00 m	37	31	(Germany) HBW Balingen-Weilstetten

=== Chile ===
The final squad was announced on 31 December 2018.

Head coach: (Spain) Mateo Garralda

No.	Pos.	Name	Date of birth (age)	Height	App.	Goals	Club
1	GK	Felipe Barrientos	12 June 1984 (aged 34)	1.84 m	90	2	(Spain) BM Zamora
2	LW	Sebastián Ceballos	1 July 1992 (aged 26)	1.75 m	44	64	(Spain) BM Zamora
4	LB	Erwin Feuchtmann	2 May 1990 (aged 28)	1.90 m	48	190	(France) Istres Provence Handball
5	LW	Elías Oyarzún	11 December 1988 (aged 30)	1.74 m	20	40	(Chile) Balónmano Ovalle
7	LB	Diego Reyes	24 July 1992 (aged 26)	1.82 m	35	40	(Spain) ARS Palma del Río
9	P	Javier Frelijj	28 January 1991 (aged 27)	1.90 m	40	45	(Chile) CD Luterano
10	CB	Emil Feuchtmann	1 June 1983 (aged 35)	1.76 m	119	310	(France) Grand Nancy Métropole Handball
11	P	Esteban Salinas	18 January 1992 (aged 26)	1.80 m	55	95	(Spain) CD Bidasoa
12	GK	Felipe García	26 October 1993 (aged 25)	1.88 m	28	1	(Chile) Italiano
17	RB	Rodrigo Salinas Muñoz	25 February 1989 (aged 29)	1.88 m	78	210	(Spain) CD Bidasoa
18	CB	Julio Baumann	29 January 1998 (aged 20)	1.85 m	0	0
20	RW	Sebastián Pavez	30 August 1996 (aged 22)	1.82 m	4	9	(Chile) BM Usab
29	P	Marco Oneto	3 June 1982 (aged 36)	2.04 m	110	175
30	RB	Daniel Ayala	30 December 1995 (aged 23)	1.78 m	16	32	(Chile) BM Usab
44	LB	Aaron Codina	19 February 1999 (aged 19)	1.93 m	10	12	(Chile) Liceo Nacional de Maipú
77	LB	Víctor Donoso	27 November 1990 (aged 28)	1.90 m	40	45	(Italy) Junior Fasano

=== Denmark ===
A 28-player squad was announced on 10 December 2018. The final squad was announced on 19 December 2018. On 21 December 2018 Niclas Kirkeløkke was replaced by Martin Larsen because of an injury. On 2 January Hans Lindberg was replaced by Jóhan Hansen because of an injury. The same change was made on 12 January.

Head coach: Nikolaj Jacobsen

No.	Pos.	Name	Date of birth (age)	Height	App.	Goals	Club
1	GK	Niklas Landin Jacobsen	19 December 1988 (aged 30)	2.01 m	189	6	(Germany) THW Kiel
4	LW	Magnus Landin Jacobsen	20 August 1995 (aged 23)	1.96 m	42	75	(Germany) THW Kiel
6	LW	Casper Ulrich Mortensen	14 December 1989 (aged 29)	1.90 m	120	317	(Spain) FC Barcelona
10	LB	Nikolaj Markussen	1 August 1988 (aged 30)	2.12 m	57	132	(Denmark) Bjerringbro-Silkeborg
11	CB	Rasmus Lauge Schmidt	20 June 1991 (aged 27)	1.93 m	107	233	(Germany) Flensburg-Handewitt
14	P	Anders Zachariassen	4 September 1991 (aged 27)	1.92 m	25	51	(Germany) Flensburg-Handewitt
16	GK	Jannick Green	29 September 1989 (aged 29)	1.95 m	113	2	(Germany) Magdeburg
17	RW	Lasse Svan Hansen	31 August 1983 (aged 35)	1.85 m	198	454	(Germany) Flensburg-Handewitt
18	RW	Hans Lindberg	1 August 1981 (aged 37)	1.88 m	261	729	(Germany) Füchse Berlin
19	P	Rene Toft Hansen	1 November 1984 (aged 34)	2.00 m	137	199	(Hungary) Telekom Veszprém
21	LB	Henrik Møllgaard	2 January 1985 (aged 34)	1.96 m	135	164	(Denmark) Aalborg Håndbold
22	CB	Mads Mensah Larsen	12 August 1991 (aged 27)	1.88 m	111	217	(Germany) Rhein-Neckar Löwen
23	P	Henrik Toft Hansen	18 December 1986 (aged 32)	2.00 m	117	210	(France) Paris Saint-Germain
24	LB	Mikkel Hansen	22 October 1987 (aged 31)	1.92 m	191	907	(France) Paris Saint-Germain
25	CB	Morten Olsen	11 October 1984 (aged 34)	1.84 m	79	182	(Germany) TSV Hannover-Burgdorf
26	RW	Jóhan Hansen	1 May 1994 (aged 24)	1.90 m	13	27	(Denmark) Bjerringbro-Silkeborg
31	RB	Nikolaj Øris Nielsen	26 September 1986 (aged 32)	1.94 m	24	24	(Denmark) Bjerringbro-Silkeborg
34	P	Simon Hald	28 September 1994 (aged 24)	2.03 m	15	11	(Germany) Flensburg-Handewitt

=== Norway ===
A 28-player squad was announced on 10 December 2018. The squad was reduced to 18 players on 14 December 2018. On 4 January 2019, it was announced that Kent Robin Tønnesen had to withdraw from the squad due to an injury, and was replaced by Harald Reinkind. On 14 January, Henrik Jakobsen replaced Petter Øverby in the squad. On 21 January, Øverby was added back in the squad and replaced Kevin Gulliksen.

Head coach: Christian Berge

No.	Pos.	Name	Date of birth (age)	Height	App.	Goals	Club
5	CB	Sander Sagosen	14 September 1995 (aged 23)	1.95 m	80	346	(France) Paris Saint-Germain
8	P	Bjarte Myrhol	29 May 1982 (aged 36)	1.95 m	226	694	(Denmark) Skjern Håndbold
9	P	Henrik Jakobsen	16 December 1992 (aged 26)	1.96 m	33	34	(France) Toulouse
11	P	Petter Øverby	26 March 1992 (aged 26)	1.95 m	49	17	(Germany) HC Erlangen
16	GK	Espen Christensen	17 June 1985 (aged 33)	1.90 m	88	2	(Germany) GWD Minden
17	LW	Magnus Jøndal	7 February 1988 (aged 30)	1.81 m	128	355	(Germany) SG Flensburg-Handewitt
19	RW	Kristian Bjørnsen	10 January 1989 (aged 30)	1.92 m	98	457	(Germany) HSG Wetzlar
21	P	Magnus Gullerud	13 November 1991 (aged 27)	1.93 m	106	121	(Germany) GWD Minden
23	LB	Gøran Johannessen	26 April 1994 (aged 24)	1.93 m	45	77	(Germany) SG Flensburg-Handewitt
24	CB	Christian O'Sullivan	22 August 1991 (aged 27)	1.90 m	95	143	(Germany) SC Magdeburg
25	RB	Eivind Tangen	4 May 1993 (aged 25)	1.95 m	67	111	(Denmark) Skjern Håndbold
27	RB	Harald Reinkind	17 August 1992 (aged 26)	1.96 m	81	162	(Germany) THW Kiel
30	GK	Torbjørn Bergerud	16 July 1994 (aged 24)	2.00 m	58	0	(Germany) SG Flensburg-Handewitt
44	RW	Kevin Gulliksen	9 November 1996 (aged 22)	1.79 m	13	13	(Germany) GWD Minden
71	LW	Alexander Blonz	17 April 2000 (aged 18)	1.85 m	3	7	(Norway) Viking HK
77	RB	Magnus Abelvik Rød	7 July 1997 (aged 21)	2.03 m	34	47	(Germany) SG Flensburg-Handewitt
89	LB	Espen Lie Hansen	1 March 1989 (aged 29)	1.96 m	149	443	(France) HBC Nantes

=== Saudi Arabia ===
A 22-player squad was announced on 27 November 2018. The final squad was announced on 2 January 2019.

Head coach: (Slovenia) Boris Denič

No.	Pos.	Name	Date of birth (age)	Height	App.	Goals	Club
1	GK	Amro Mohammed	28 June 1989 (aged 29)	1.87 m	0	0	(Saudi Arabia) Al-Ahli
3	LW	Abdullah Al-Abbas	30 January 1992 (aged 26)	1.65 m	52	180	(Saudi Arabia) Al-Noor
5	P	Hassan Al-Janabi (c)	25 July 1983 (aged 35)	1.86 m	66	79	(Saudi Arabia) Mudhar
7	RB	Rami Al-Mutairi	25 October 1995 (aged 23)	1.72 m	75	90	(Saudi Arabia) Al-Arabi
10	P	Ali Al-Ibrahim	24 May 1997 (aged 21)	1.81 m	23	52	(Saudi Arabia) Al-Khaligj
13	RW	Abdulazez Saeed	28 January 1990 (aged 28)	1.86 m	21	17	(Saudi Arabia) Al-Ahli
15	RW	Ahmed Al-Abdulali	18 June 1988 (aged 30)	1.82 m	120	300	(Saudi Arabia) Mudhar
16	GK	Mohammad Al-Salem	3 April 1986 (aged 32)	1.85 m	210	14	(Saudi Arabia) Al-Noor
18	CB	Fahad Al-Farhan	25 October 1995 (aged 23)	1.76 m	9	1	(Saudi Arabia) Al-Rawdhah
23	LW	Abdullah Al-Hulaili	16 June 1994 (aged 24)	1.74 m	21	35	(Saudi Arabia) Mudhar
33	P	Adnan Radnah	19 December 1991 (aged 27)	1.91 m	0	0	(Saudi Arabia) Al-Ahli
37	CB	Mohammed Al-Abbas	19 December 1992 (aged 26)	1.70 m	81	170	(Saudi Arabia) Mudhar
44	LB	Mahdi Al-Salem	16 February 1990 (aged 28)	1.85 m	126	396	(Saudi Arabia) Al-Noor
57	CB	Mojtaba Al-Salem	15 June 1994 (aged 24)	1.81 m	43	124	(Saudi Arabia) Al-Noor
66	RB	Abdulaziz Khayri	18 June 1997 (aged 21)	1.83 m	7	15	(Saudi Arabia) Al-Ahli
90	LW	Muneer Abu Al-Rahi	16 June 1994 (aged 24)	1.74 m	21	35	(Saudi Arabia) Mudhar
93	LB	Abdullah Al-Hammad	10 October 1990 (aged 28)	1.85 m	90	112	(Saudi Arabia) Al-Noor
99	LB	Abbas Al-Saffar	15 January 1994 (aged 24)	1.82 m	28	41	(Saudi Arabia) Mudhar

=== Tunisia ===
A 18-player squad was revealed on 12 December 2018. A 17-player squad was revealed on 21 December 2018. The final squad was announced on 31 December 2018.

Head coach: (Spain) Antonio Gerona

No.	Pos.	Name	Date of birth (age)	Height	App.	Goals	Club
1	GK	Makram Missaoui	14 February 1981 (aged 37)	1.88 m	188	4	(Romania) CS Dinamo București
7	RW	Ramzi Majdoub	9 May 1993 (aged 25)	1.88 m	13	34	(Tunisia) Club Africain
10	CB	Kamel Alouini	6 July 1988 (aged 30)	1.82 m	123	251	(Romania) CS Dinamo București
12	GK	Marouen Maggaiz	28 July 1983 (aged 35)	1.92 m	200	3	(Romania) CSM București
13	RW/RB	Oussama Hosni	17 September 1992 (aged 26)	1.92 m	94	109	(France) Pontault-Combault
15	CB	Khaled Haj Youssef	12 January 1989 (aged 29)	1.89 m	80	56	(Qatar) Al Sadd
17	LB	Youssef Maaraf	21 July 1996 (aged 22)	1.95 m	13	14	(Egypt) Al Ahly
19	LB	Mosbah Sanaï	26 March 1991 (aged 27)	1.91 m	108	303	(United Arab Emirates) Al-Nasr
20	CB	Achraf Saafi	11 August 1992 (aged 26)	1.85 m	54	115	(Tunisia) Sahel HC
21	LW	Oussama Boughanmi	5 February 1990 (aged 28)	1.85 m	130	584	(Tunisia) Espérance de Tunis
39	CB/LB	Mohamed Soussi	17 January 1993 (aged 25)	1.94 m	90	141	(France) Montpellier Handball
42	LB	Wael Jallouz	3 May 1991 (aged 27)	1.97 m	126	332	(Germany) Füchse Berlin
69	P	Jihed Jaballah	29 July 1989 (aged 29)	2.04 m	51	89	(Turkey) Selka Eskisehir
89	LW	Rafik Bacha	4 December 1989 (aged 29)	1.88 m	27	99	(Tunisia) Sahel HC
90	P	Marouan Chouiref	27 May 1990 (aged 28)	1.95 m	138	215	Tremblay-en-France
92	LB	Oussama Jaziri	6 November 1992 (aged 26)	1.91 m	19	36	(Tunisia) Espérance de Tunis
93	GK	Ahmed Bedoui	1 December 1993 (aged 25)	1.93 m	10	0	(Tunisia) Espérance de Tunis
96	RW	Anouar Ben Abdallah	20 June 1996 (aged 22)	1.86 m	22	33	(Tunisia) Sahel HC

== Group D ==
=== Angola ===
A 19-player squad was announced on 20 November 2018. The final squad was announced on 28 December 2018.

Head coach: Filipe Cruz

No.	Pos.	Name	Date of birth (age)	Height	App.	Goals	Club
2	P	Agnelo Quitongo	22 November 1991 (aged 27)	1.88 m	5	3	(Angola) Primeiro de Agosto
4	P	Gabriel Teca	2 February 1991 (aged 27)	1.92 m	31	28	(Angola) Primeiro de Agosto
5	CB	Romé Hebo	11 April 1992 (aged 26)	1.92 m	54	84	(Angola) Primeiro de Agosto
7	CB	Cláudio Lopes	28 February 1992 (aged 26)	1.77 m	0	0	(Angola) Primeiro de Agosto
8	LW	Otiniel Pascoal	21 February 1995 (aged 23)	1.79 m	39	42	(Angola) Primeiro de Agosto
9	CB	Adilson Maneco	2 March 1993 (aged 25)	1.70 m	39	42	(Angola) Primeiro de Agosto
10	CB	Manuel Nascimento	15 March 1994 (aged 24)	1.83 m	40	90	(Angola) Primeiro de Agosto
11	LB	Francisco Almeida	5 June 1995 (aged 23)	1.90 m	0	0	(Angola) Primeiro de Agosto
13	P	Aguinaldo Tati	10 August 1990 (aged 28)	2.00 m	0	0	(Angola) Primeiro de Agosto
14	LW	Claúdio Chicola	25 September 1999 (aged 19)	1.90 m	0	0	(Angola) G.D. Interclube
16	GK	Giovane Muachissengue	20 February 1984 (aged 34)	1.88 m	53	1	(Angola) Primeiro de Agosto
19	RW	Elsemar Pedro	4 April 1990 (aged 28)	1.80 m	39	30	(Angola) Primeiro de Agosto
20	GK	Custódio Gouveia	27 July 1985 (aged 33)	1.91 m	0	0	Inter Clube Angola
21	RW	Adelino Pestana	11 March 1992 (aged 26)	1.86 m	49	125	(Angola) G.D. Interclube
79	RW	Edvaldo Ferreira	28 May 1990 (aged 28)	2.00 m	31	122	(Egypt) Smouha Club Alexandria
99	P	Declerck Sibo	19 May 1994 (aged 24)	1.92 m	21	19	(Angola) Primeiro de Agosto

=== Argentina ===
The final squad was announced on 28 December 2018.

Head coach: (Spain) Manolo Cadenas

No.	Pos.	Name	Date of birth (age)	Height	App.	Goals	Club
1	GK	Matías Schulz	12 February 1982 (aged 36)	1.90 m	196	4	(Switzerland) Pfadi Winterthur
2	LW	Federico Fernández	17 October 1989 (aged 29)	1.91 m	151	551	(Argentina) UNLu
4	CB	Sebastián Simonet	12 May 1986 (aged 32)	1.89 m	155	345	(Spain) Ademar León
7	LW	Ignacio Pizarro	8 February 1990 (aged 28)	1.78 m	24	59	(Argentina) UNLu
8	CB	Pablo Simonet	4 May 1992 (aged 26)	1.85 m	83	183	(Spain) CB Benidorm
9	RW	Santiago Baronetto	27 October 1992 (aged 26)	1.87 m	31	14	(Spain) BM Ciudad Encantada
10	RB	Federico Matías Vieyra	21 July 1988 (aged 30)	1.92 m	190	395	(Spain) Ademar León
11	P	Lucas Moscariello	19 February 1992 (aged 26)	1.90 m	34	52	(Spain) BM Ciudad Encantada
13	CB	Juan Pablo Fernández	30 September 1988 (aged 30)	1.92 m	121	162	(Argentina) UNLu
15	P	Gonzalo Carou	15 August 1979 (aged 39)	1.90 m	240	513	(Spain) Ademar León
17	CB	Manuel Crivelli	18 October 1993 (aged 25)	1.78 m	14	19	(France) Cavigal Nice Handball
18	LB	Guillermo Fischer	18 July 1996 (aged 22)	2.00 m	15	22	(Spain) SD Teucro
20	RB	Ramiro Martínez	22 July 1995 (aged 23)	1.80 m	9	22	(Spain) MMT Seguros Zamora
22	P	Gastón Mouriño	12 October 1994 (aged 24)	1.92 m	14	23	(Spain) BM Valladolid
40	GK	Leonel Maciel	4 January 1989 (aged 30)	1.92 m	52	6	(Spain) BM Ciudad Encantada
77	LB	Nicolás Bonanno	18 November 1991 (aged 27)	1.98 m	22	21	(Spain) BM Huesca

=== Egypt ===
A 17-player squad was revealed on 28 November 2018. The final squad was announced on 7 January 2019.

Head coach: (Spain) David Davis

No.	Pos.	Name	Date of birth (age)	Height	App.	Goals	Club
5	RB	Yahia Omar	9 September 1997 (aged 21)	1.95 m	81		(Egypt) Zamalek
9	CB	Eslam Eissa	2 July 1988 (aged 30)	1.90 m	356		(Egypt) Al Ahly
17	CB	Ahmed Khairy	15 September 1994 (aged 24)	1.88 m	82		(Egypt) Al Ahly
18	P	Mohamed Maher	26 May 1992 (aged 26)	1.95 m	25		(Egypt) Al Gazira
22	LB	Omar Hagag	13 March 1990 (aged 28)	1.90 m	192		(Egypt) Al Ahly
24	P	Ibrahim El-Masry	11 March 1989 (aged 29)	1.95 m	149		(Egypt) Al Ahly
25	P	Wisam Nawar	14 February 1990 (aged 28)	1.85 m	146		(Egypt) Zamalek
28	LB	Abdelrahman Abdou	30 January 1996 (aged 22)	1.92 m	45		(Egypt) Al Ahly
31	LW	Omar El-Wakil	14 May 1988 (aged 30)	1.76 m	188		(Egypt) Al Ahly
39	LB	Yehia El-Deraa	17 July 1995 (aged 23)	1.90 m	136		(Egypt) Zamalek
53	RW	Akram Saad	22 November 1994 (aged 24)	1.82 m	80		(Egypt) Zamalek
66	RB	Ahmed El-Ahmar	27 January 1984 (aged 34)	1.89 m	696		(Egypt) Zamalek
88	GK	Karim Handawy	1 May 1988 (aged 30)	1.88 m	360		(Turkey) Beşiktaş
89	P	Mohamed Shebib	1 April 1989 (aged 29)	1.91 m	166		(France) Montpellier Handball
90	LB	Ali Zein	14 December 1990 (aged 28)	1.94 m	230		(United Arab Emirates) Sharjah
91	RW	Mohamed Sanad	16 January 1991 (aged 27)	1.91 m	205		(France) USAM Nîmes Gard
92	LW	Karim Abdelrahim	27 October 1992 (aged 26)	1.87 m	80		(Egypt) Zamalek
96	GK	Mohamed El-Tayar	7 April 1996 (aged 22)	1.92 m	42		(Egypt) Al Ahly

=== Hungary ===
A 28-player squad was announced on 10 December 2018. A 21-player squad was revealed on 18 December 2018. It was reduced to 18 players on 30 December 2018. The final squad was announced on 8 January 2019.

Head coach: István Csoknyai

No.	Pos.	Name	Date of birth (age)	Height	App.	Goals	Club
2	P	Adrián Sipos	8 March 1990 (aged 28)	1.98 m	8	10	(Hungary) Tatabánya KC
3	LB	Ferenc Ilyés	20 December 1981 (aged 37)	1.98 m	219	509	(Hungary) Tatabánya KC
5	P	Timuzsin Schuch	5 June 1985 (aged 33)	1.97 m	164	80	(Hungary) Ferencvárosi TC
6	LW	Ádám Juhász	6 June 1996 (aged 22)	1.83 m	30	66	(Hungary) Tatabánya KC
7	CB	Gábor Császár	16 June 1984 (aged 34)	1.86 m	238	837	(Switzerland) Kadetten Schaffhausen
9	RB	Zsolt Balogh	29 March 1989 (aged 29)	1.89 m	47	123	(Hungary) MOL-Pick Szeged
11	LB	Patrik Ligetvári	13 February 1996 (aged 22)	2.01 m	30	18	(Spain) CB Ademar León
12	GK	Márton Székely	2 January 1990 (aged 29)	1.95 m	29	0	(Hungary) Tatabánya KC
13	LW	Bendegúz Bóka	2 October 1993 (aged 25)	1.95 m	13	26	(Hungary) Balatonfüredi KSE
16	GK	Roland Mikler	20 September 1984 (aged 34)	1.90 m	190	0	(Hungary) Telekom Veszprém
19	RB	László Nagy	3 March 1981 (aged 37)	2.08 m	201	732	(Hungary) Telekom Veszprém
22	LB	Iman Jamali	11 October 1991 (aged 27)	2.00 m	32	80	(Hungary) Telekom Veszprém
23	RB	Dominik Máthé	1 April 1999 (aged 19)	2.01 m	2	1	(Hungary) Balatonfüredi KSE
27	P	Bence Bánhidi	9 February 1995 (aged 23)	2.06 m	54	128	(Hungary) MOL-Pick Szeged
30	LB	Zoltán Szita	10 February 1998 (aged 20)	1.96 m	2	2	(Hungary) Balatonfüredi KSE
33	RB	Gábor Ancsin	27 November 1990 (aged 28)	2.02 m	105	214	(Hungary) Ferencvárosi TC
39	LB	Richárd Bodó	13 March 1993 (aged 25)	2.03 m	53	157	(Hungary) MOL-Pick Szeged
47	RW	Péter Hornyák	4 October 1995 (aged 23)	1.75 m	25	34	(Hungary) Balatonfüredi KSE
66	CB	Máté Lékai	16 June 1988 (aged 30)	1.90 m	124	331	(Hungary) Telekom Veszprém

=== Qatar ===
A 19-player squad was revealed on 18 December 2018. The final squad was announced on 5 January 2019.

Head coach: (Spain) Valero Rivera

No.	Pos.	Name	Date of birth (age)	Height	App.	Goals	Club
1	GK	Rasheed Yusuff	16 October 1994 (aged 24)	1.89 m	67	0	(Qatar) Al Sadd
7	LB	Bertrand Roiné	17 February 1981 (aged 37)	1.98 m	69	158	(Qatar) Al-Duhail
9	LB	Rafael Capote	5 October 1987 (aged 31)	2.00 m	62	251	(Qatar) Al-Duhail
10	LB	Frankis Carol	7 September 1987 (aged 31)	1.91 m	9	46	(Portugal) Sporting CP
12	GK	Danijel Šarić	27 June 1977 (aged 41)	1.91 m	50	0	(Qatar) Al-Duhail
16	GK	Anadin Suljaković	16 June 1998 (aged 20)	1.96 m	11	0	(Qatar) Al Ahli SC
17	P	Firas Chaieb	21 July 1992 (aged 26)	1.94 m	38	74	(Qatar) Al-Duhail
23	RW	Allaedine Berrached	31 January 1994 (aged 24)	1.86 m	38	70	(Qatar) Al-Duhail
24	LB	Wajdi Sinen (c)	17 September 1990 (aged 28)	1.93 m	71	232	(Qatar) Al-Gharafa
25	CB	Kamalaldin Mallash	1 January 1992 (aged 27)	1.85 m	83	155	(Qatar) Al-Rayan
29	RW	Nidhal Aissa	8 June 1991 (aged 27)	1.82 m	11	17	(Qatar) Al-Wakrah SC
31	LW	Ahmad Madadi (c)	31 August 1994 (aged 24)	1.75 m	44	128	(Qatar) Al-Duhail
41	P	Youssef Benali	28 May 1987 (aged 31)	1.93 m	56	149	(France) C' Chartres MHB
86	LW	Mahmoud Hassaballa	22 November 1986 (aged 32)	1.82 m	46	89	(Qatar) Al Ahli SC
92	LW	Anis Zouaoui	7 February 1992 (aged 26)	1.84 m	18	95	(Qatar) Al-Rayyan
93	LW	Hamdi Ayed	16 August 1993 (aged 25)	1.78 m	36	100	(Qatar) Al Sadd
94	LB	Ameen Zakkar	15 June 1994 (aged 24)	1.98 m	46	80	(Qatar) Al-Rayan
97	CB	Moustafa Heiba	17 December 1996 (aged 22)	1.84 m	52	147	(Qatar) Al-Wakrah SC

=== Sweden ===
A 18-player squad was announced on 10 December 2018. On 27 December 2018 the squad was reduced to 17 players because Philip Henningsson was excluded from the squad due to injury. Hampus Wanne was included on 14 January 2019.

Head coach: (Iceland) Kristján Andrésson

No.	Pos.	Name	Date of birth (age)	Height	App.	Goals	Club
5	P	Max Darj	27 September 1991 (aged 27)	1.92 m	41	21	(Germany) Bergischer HC
9	LW	Jerry Tollbring	13 September 1995 (aged 23)	1.82 m	51	158	(Germany) Rhein-Neckar Löwen
10	RW	Niclas Ekberg	23 December 1988 (aged 30)	1.91 m	167	684	(Germany) THW Kiel
12	GK	Andreas Palicka	10 July 1986 (aged 32)	1.89 m	87	2	(Germany) Rhein-Neckar Löwen
14	CB	Jesper Konradsson	4 June 1994 (aged 24)	1.84 m	41	49	(Denmark) Skjern Håndbold
15	LW	Hampus Wanne	10 December 1993 (aged 25)	1.85 m	20	42	(Germany) SG Flensburg-Handewitt
17	LB	Simon Jeppsson	15 July 1995 (aged 23)	2.03 m	34	77	(Germany) SG Flensburg-Handewitt
18	P	Fredric Pettersson	11 February 1989 (aged 29)	2.01 m	41	49	(France) Montpellier Handball
20	GK	Mikael Appelgren	6 September 1989 (aged 29)	1.91 m	73	2	(Germany) Rhein-Neckar Löwen
23	RB	Albin Lagergren	11 September 1992 (aged 26)	1.86 m	36	99	(Germany) SC Magdeburg
24	CB	Jim Gottfridsson	2 September 1992 (aged 26)	1.91 m	68	239	(Germany) SG Flensburg-Handewitt
25	CB	Linus Arnesson	11 May 1990 (aged 28)	1.88 m	21	20	(Germany) Bergischer HC
32	RW	Mattias Zachrisson	22 August 1990 (aged 28)	1.78 m	118	274	(Germany) Füchse Berlin
35	P	Andreas Nilsson	12 May 1990 (aged 28)	1.97 m	121	273	(Hungary) Telekom Veszprém
36	P	Jesper Nielsen	30 August 1989 (aged 29)	2.00 m	100	134	(Germany) Rhein-Neckar Löwen
55	RB	Kim Andersson	21 August 1982 (aged 36)	2.00 m	229	800	(Sweden) Ystads IF
60	LB	Kim Ekdahl du Rietz	23 July 1989 (aged 29)	1.94 m	77	230	(France) Paris Saint-Germain
65	LB	Lukas Nilsson	16 November 1996 (aged 22)	1.94 m	55	133	(Germany) THW Kiel

== Coaches representation by country ==
Coaches in bold represented their own country.

Nº	Country	Coaches
7	Spain	Manolo Cadenas (Argentina), David Davis (Egypt), Mateo Garralda (Chile), Toni Gerona (Tunisia), Raúl González (Macedonia), **Jordi Ribera**, Valero Rivera (Qatar),
5	Iceland	Kristján Andrésson (Sweden), **Guðmundur Guðmundsson**, Patrekur Jóhannesson (Austria), Aron Kristjánsson (Bahrain), Dagur Sigurðsson (Japan)
1	Angola	**Filipe Cruz**
1	Brazil	**Washington Nunes**
1	Croatia	**Lino Červar**
1	Denmark	**Nikolaj Jacobsen**
1	France	**Didier Dinart**
1	Germany	**Christian Prokop**
1	Hungary	**István Csoknyai**
1	Korea	**Cho Young-shin**
1	Norway	**Christian Berge**
1	Russia	**Eduard Koksharov**
1	Serbia	**Nenad Peruničić**
1	Slovenia	Boris Denič (Saudi Arabia)
