= Handball at the 2018 Mediterranean Games =

- Venue: Campclar Sports Palace; Pavilion CE Vendrell
- Dates: 23 June – 1 July
- Nations: 13
- Teams: 13 (men); 10 (women)

Champions
- Men: Croatia
- Women: Spain

The handball tournaments at the 2018 Mediterranean Games in Tarragona took place between 23 June and 1 July 2018.

== Medal summary ==
=== Events ===
Event	Gold	Silver	Bronze
Men	Croatia; Matej Ašanin; Josip Božić Pavletić; Bruno Butorac; Josip Ereš; Halil Jaganjac; Lovro Jotić; Tin Kontrec; David Mandić; Petar Medić; Ante Kaleb; Valentino Ravnić; Marin Šipić; Ivan Sršen; Mate Šunjić; Leon Šušnja; Jakov Vranković	Tunisia; Kamel Alouini; Rafik Bacha; Amine Bannour; Ahmed Bedoui; Marouan Chouiref; Mohamed Hachicha; Khaled Haj Youssef; Oussama Hosni; Jihed Jaballah; Youssef Maaraf; Ramzi Majdoub; Makrem Missaoui; Achraf Saafi; Mosbah Sanaï; Mohamed Soussi; Skander Zaied	Spain; Aitor Ariño; Antonio Bazán; Ignacio Biosca; Marc Cañellas; Alejandro Costoya; Daniel Dujshebaev; Ángel Fernández; Adriá Figueras; Arnau García; Imanol Garciandía; Aleix Gómez; Iosu Goñi; Sergey Hernández; Ángel Montoro; Kauldi Odriozola; Iñaki Pecina
Women	Spain; Emma Boada; Carmen Campos; Mercedes Castellanos; Andrea de la Torre; Maitane Etxeberria; Alicia Fernández; Paula García; Amaia González; Lara González; Jennifer Gutiérrez; Ainhoa Hernández; Ivet Musons; María Prieto; Almudena Rodríguez; Judith Sans; Paula Valdivia	Montenegro; Vanesa Agović; Nina Bulatović; Jelena Despotović; Ivana Godeč; Itana Grbić; Đurđina Jauković; Nikolina Knežević; Branka Konatar; Tea Marinović; Esma Muratović; Ljubica Nenezić; Ivona Pavićević; Sanja Premović; Nikolina Vukčević; Dijana Ujkić	Slovenia; Ana Abina; Nives Ahlin; Ines Amon; Aneja Beganović; Mirjeta Bytyqi; Klara Hrovatič; Eleonora Kodele; Karmen Korenič; Patricija Korotaj; Lea Krajnc; Nataša Ljepoja; Tjaša Stanko; Tamara Mavsar; Alja Vrček; Ana Zrimšek; Nina Zulič

=== Medal table ===
Rank	Nation	Gold	Silver	Bronze	Total
1	Spain*	1	0	1	2
2	Croatia	1	0	0	1
3	Montenegro	0	1	0	1
3	Tunisia	0	1	0	1
5	Slovenia	0	0	1	1
Totals (5 entries)		2	2	2	6

== Participating nations ==
Men

Federation	Nation
CAHB Africa	Algeria; Egypt; Tunisia
EHF Europe	Croatia; Greece; Italy; North Macedonia; Montenegro; Portugal; Serbia; Slovenia; Spain; Turkey

Women

Federation	Nation
CAHB Africa	Egypt
EHF Europe	Greece; Italy; North Macedonia; Montenegro; Portugal; Serbia; Slovenia; Spain; Turkey
