= Abdullah Al-Wuhaib =

Saudi Arabian handball player

Personal information
- Nationality: Saudi Arabian
- Born: 1959 Unaizah, Saudi Arabia
- Died: 28 December 2007 (aged 47–48)

Sport
- Sport: Handball
- Number: 10

Senior clubs
- Years: Team
- 1975–1993: Al-Arabi
National team
- Years: Team
- 1975–1993: Saudi Arabia

Abdullah Al-Wuhaib (Arabic: عبد الله الوهيّب; 1959-28 December 2007) was a Saudi Arabian handball player, who played in Al-Arabi, he achieved several accomplishments, with his team and played from 1974 till 1993. In 2009, a biography about him was published by the name Wuhaiba the iron hand.

== Career ==
He started practicing the game when he was a student in the middle school level with the encouragement of physical education teacher Mr. Ibrahim Al-Turki, and Al-Arabi Club coach Ali Alcrdoon, and coach Mohammed Bastawisi, and made several achievements in several games including athletics.

=== National team ===
He joined in the national team with the youth team between 1976 / 1975, then he was upgraded to the first team where he achieved several positions in the runner-up in a number of official tournaments and friendly, and achieved fifth top scorer in world military championship and was named the best player in the Cup of Palestine in 1979, and the best player in the Arab cup. He participated in the Friendship Championship held in Kuwait with the Gulf team, and won the tournament's top scorer.
