= List of handball clubs in Saudi Arabia =

List of handball clubs in Saudi Arabia sorted by division:

- Al-Arabi
- Mudhar
- Al-Noor
- Al-Ahli
- Al-Khaleej
