= Ljubica Nenezić =

Montenegrin handball player (born 1997)

Ljubica Glendža
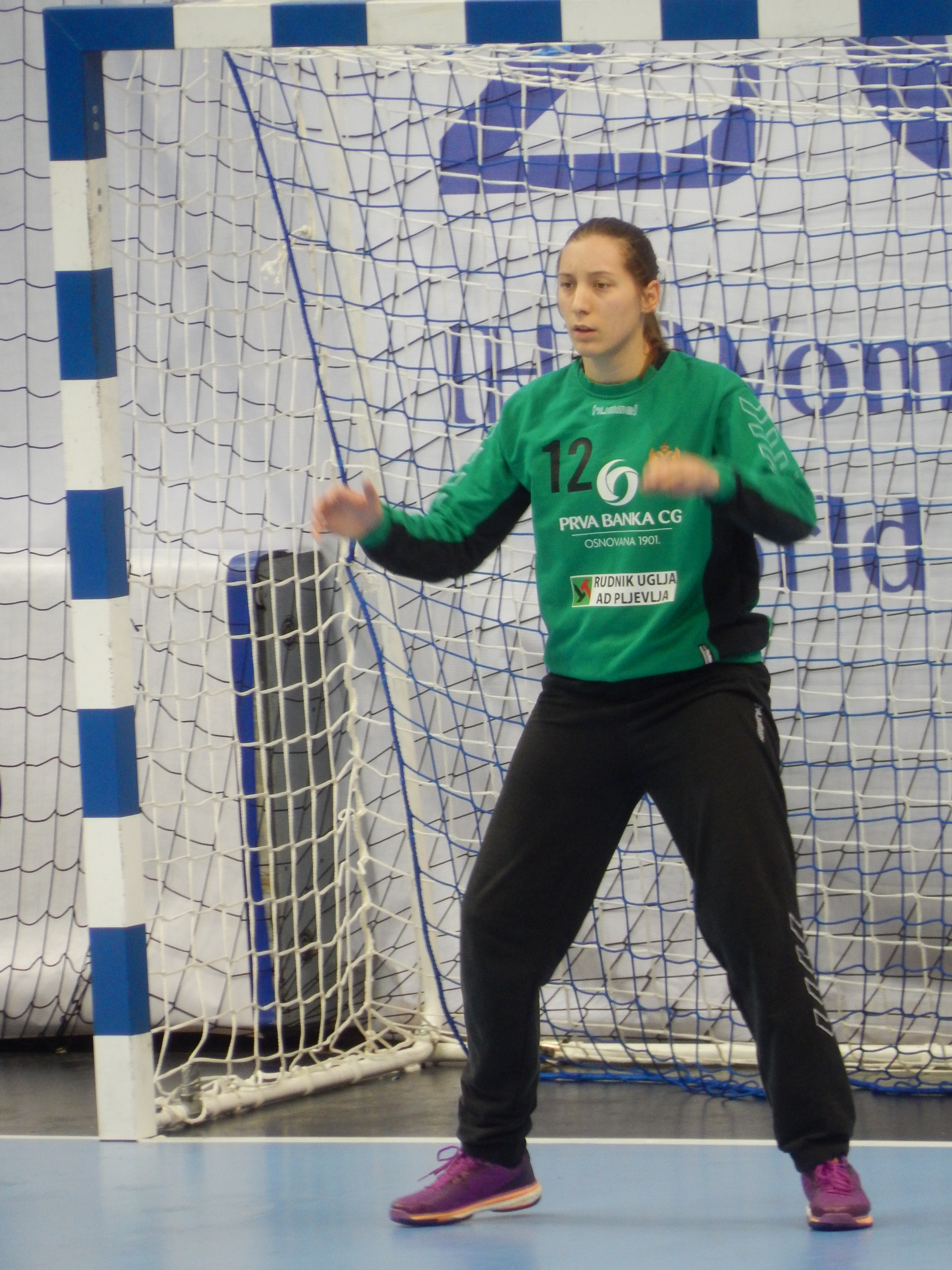

Personal information
- Nationality: Montenegrin
- Born: 15 January 1997 (age 29) Podgorica, Montenegro, FR Yugoslavia
- Height: 1.79 m (5 ft 10 in)

Sport
- Sport: Handball
- Position: Goalkeeper
- Current club: HC Gloria Buzău
- Number: 16

Senior clubs
- Years: Team
- 2015–2016: ŽRK Budućnost Podgorica
- 2016–2017: Kispest NKK
- 2017–2019: Kastamonu Bld GSK
- 2019–2020: Gloria Bistrița
- 2020–2021: HC Dunărea Brăila
- 2021–: Gloria Buzău
National team
Years	Team	Apps	(Gls)
2016–	Montenegro	51	(1)
Medal record
European Championship
Bronze medal – third place	2022 Slovenia/ Macedonia/Montenegro
Mediterranean Games
Silver medal – second place	2018 Tarragona	Team

Ljubica Glendža née Nenezić; (born 15 January 1997) is a Montenegrin handball player for HC Gloria Buzău and the Montenegrin national team.

== International honours ==
- EHF Champions League:
  - Semifinalist: 2016
- EHF Cup:
  - Semifinalist: 2018
