= Rami Al-Mutairi =

Qatari handball player

Personal information
- Nationality: Saudi Arabian
- Born: 25 October 1995 (age 30)
- Height: 1.72 m (5 ft 8 in)

Sport
- Sport: Handball
- Position: Right back
- Current club: Al-Arabi
National team
Years	Team	Apps	(Gls)
–	Saudi Arabia	82	(90)

Rami Al-Mutairi (Arabic: رامي المطيري; born 25 October 1995) is a Qatari handball player for Al-Arabi and the Saudi Arabian national team.

He represented Saudi Arabia at the 2019 World Men's Handball Championship.
