= Aguinaldo Tati =

Angolan handball player

Personal information
- Nationality: Angolan
- Born: 10 August 1990 (age 36)
- Height: 2.00 m (6 ft 7 in)

Sport
- Sport: Handball
- Position: Pivot
- Current club: Primeiro de Agosto
National team
Years	Team	Apps	(Gls)
2019–	Angola	7	(0)

Aguinaldo Tati (born 10 August 1990) is an Angolan handball player for Primeiro de Agosto and the Angolan national team.

He represented Angola at the 2019 World Men's Handball Championship.
