= Ahmed Husain =

Bahraini handball player

Personal information
- Nationality: Bahraini
- Born: 11 January 1999 (age 27)
- Height: 1.80 m (5 ft 11 in)

Sport
- Sport: Handball
- Position: Centre back
- Current club: Al-Ahli
- Number: 72
National team
Years	Team	Apps	(Gls)
–	Bahrain	34	(96)

Ahmed Husain (born 11 January 1999) is a Bahraini handball player for Al-Ahli and the Bahraini national team.

He represented Bahrain at the 2019 World Men's Handball Championship.
