= Jihed Jaballah =

Tunisian handball player (born 1989)

Personal information
- Nationality: Tunisian
- Born: 29 July 1989 (age 37) Sousse, Tunisia
- Height: 2.04 m (6 ft 8 in)

Sport
- Sport: Handball
- Position: Pivot
- Current club: Dunkerque HGL
- Number: 69

Senior clubs
- Years: Team
- 2010–2018: ÉS Sahel
- 2018–2019: Selka Eskişehir
- 2019–2020: IFK Kristianstad
- 2020: → Al Ahli (loan)
- 2020–2021: HT Tatran Prešov
- 2022–: Dunkerque HGL
National team
Years	Team	Apps	(Gls)
–	Tunisia	59	(111)
Medal record
African Championship
Gold medal – first place	2018 Gabon
Silver medal – second place	2020 Tunisia
Mediterranean Games
Silver medal – second place	2018 Tarragona	Team

Jihed Jaballah (born 29 July 1989) is a Tunisian handball player who plays for Dunkerque HGL and the Tunisian national team.

He participated at the 2017 World Men's Handball Championship.
