= Abdulla Yaseen =

Bahraini handball player

Personal information
- Nationality: Bahraini
- Born: 6 October 1998 (age 28)
- Height: 1.80 m (5 ft 11 in)

Sport
- Sport: Handball
- Position: Left back
- Current club: Al-Shabab
- Number: 89
National team
Years	Team	Apps	(Gls)
–	Bahrain	37	(122)

Abdulla Yaseen (born 6 October 1998) is a Bahraini handball player for Al-Shabab and the Bahraini national team.

He represented Bahrain at the 2019 World Men's Handball Championship.
