= Mohamed Soussi =

Tunisian handball player (born 1993)

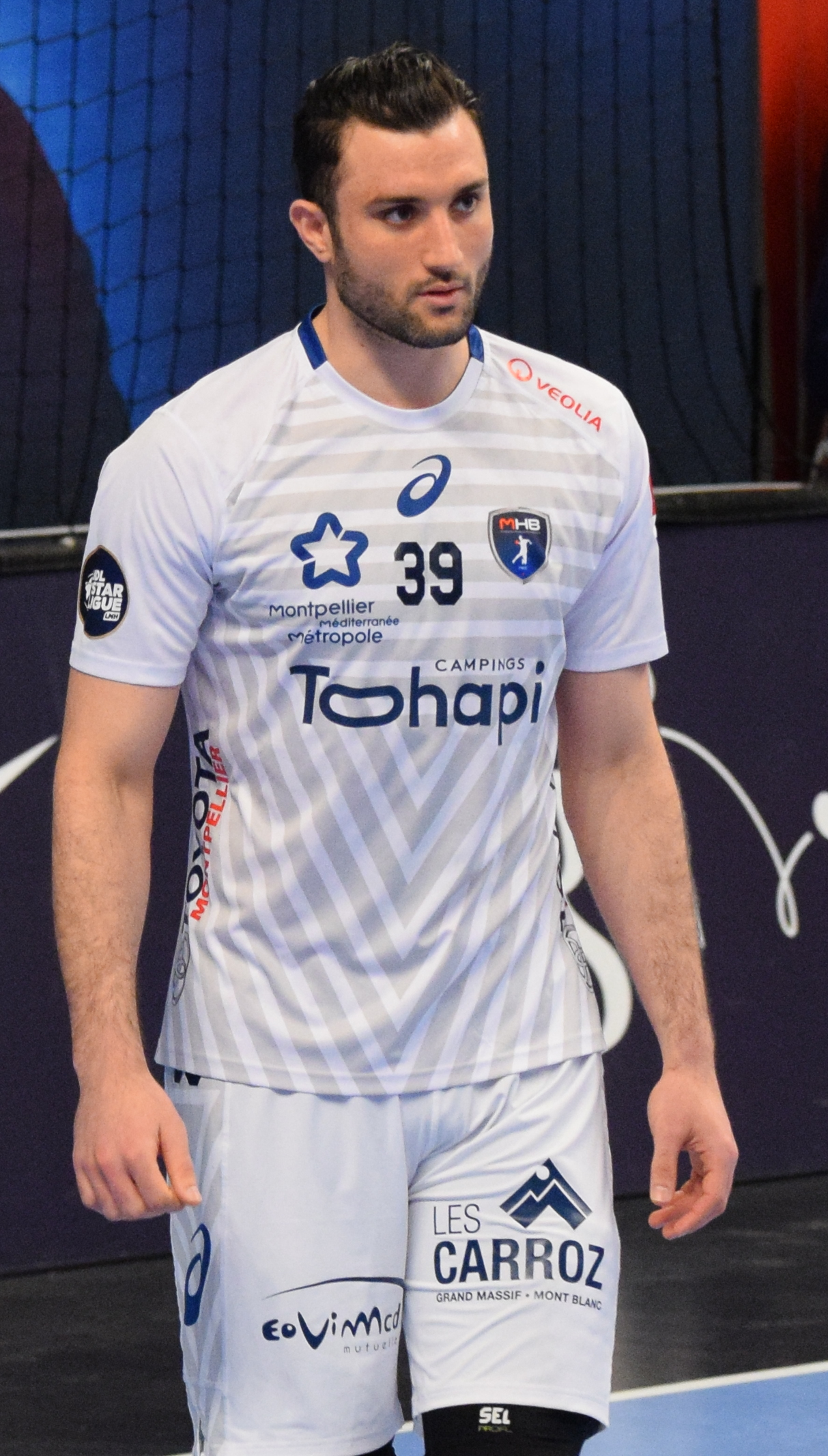

Personal information
- Nationality: Tunisian
- Born: 17 January 1993 (age 33) Nabeul, Tunisia
- Height: 1.94 m (6 ft 4 in)

Sport
- Sport: Handball
- Position: Centre/Left back
- Current club: Montpellier Handball
- Number: 39
National team
Years	Team	Apps	(Gls)
–	Tunisia	98	(159)
Medal record
Men's handball
Representing Qatar
African Championship
Gold medal – first place	2018 Gabon
Silver medal – second place	2020 Tunisia
Mediterranean Games
Silver medal – second place	2018 Tarragona	Team
Islamic Solidarity Games
Gold medal – first place	2021 Konya

Mohamed Soussi (Arabic: محمد السوسي; born 17 January 1993) is a Tunisian-Qatari handball player for Montpellier Handball and the Tunisian national team.

He participated on the Tunisia national team at the 2016 Summer Olympics in Rio de Janeiro, in the men's handball tournament.
