= Abdulaziz Khayri =

Qatari handball player

Personal information
- Nationality: Saudi Arabian
- Born: 18 June 1997 (age 29)
- Height: 1.83 m (6 ft 0 in)

Sport
- Sport: Handball
- Position: Right back
- Current club: Al-Ahli
National team
| Years | Team | Apps | (Gls) |
| – | Saudi Arabia | 14 | (28) |

Abdulaziz Khayri (Arabic: عبد العزيز خيري; born 18 June 1997) is a Qatari handball player for Al-Ahli and the Saudi Arabian national team.

He represented Saudi Arabia at the 2019 World Men's Handball Championship.
