= Ryosuke Sasaki =

Japanese handball player (born 1993)

Personal information
- Nationality: Japanese
- Born: 3 March 1993 (age 33)
- Height: 1.92 m (6 ft 4 in)

Sport
- Sport: Handball
- Position: Goalkeeper
- Current club: Toyoda Gosei
National team
Years	Team	Apps	(Gls)
2019–	Japan	7	(0)

Ryosuke Sasaki (佐々木 亮輔, Sasaki Ryōsuke; born 6 March 1993) is a Japanese handball player for Toyoda Gosei and the Japanese national team.

He represented Japan at the 2019 World Men's Handball Championship.
