= Achraf Saafi =

Tunisian handball player

Personal information
- Nationality: Tunisian
- Born: 11 August 1992 (age 34) Moknine, Tunisia
- Height: 1.85 m (6 ft 1 in)

Sport
- Sport: Handball
- Position: Centre back
- Current club: Sahel HC
- Number: 19
National team
Years	Team	Apps	(Gls)
–	Tunisia	57	(116)
Medal record
Mediterranean Games
Silver medal – second place	2018 Tarragona	Team

Achraf Saafi (born 11 August 1992) is a Tunisian handball player for Sahel HC and the Tunisian national team.

He represented Tunisia at the 2019 World Men's Handball Championship.
