= Halil Jaganjac =

Croatian handball player (born 1998)

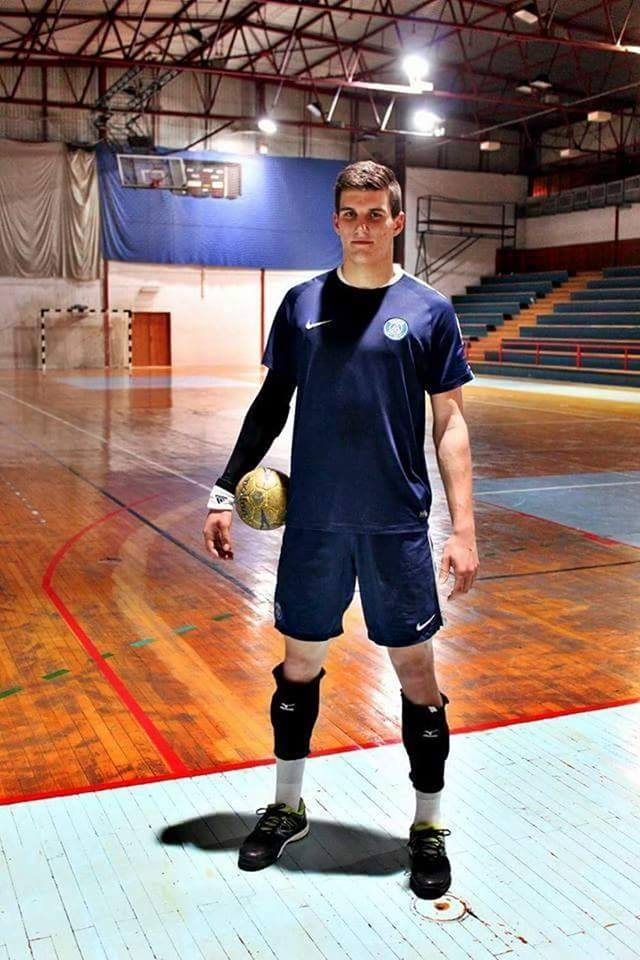
- Jaganjac with RK Kozala in 2016

Personal information
- Nationality: Croatian
- Born: 22 June 1998 (age 28) Rijeka, Croatia
- Height: 2.00 m (6 ft 7 in)

Sport
- Sport: Handball
- Position: Left back
- Current club: Rhein-Neckar Löwen
- Number: 45

Senior clubs
- Years: Team
- 2014–2016: MRK Kozala
- 2016–2017: Paris Saint-Germain II
- 2017–2018: RK Metalurg Skopje
- 2018–2022: RK Nexe Našice
- 2022–2025: Industria Kielce
- 2022–2025: → Rhein-Neckar Löwen
- 2025–: Rhein-Neckar Löwen
National team
Years	Team	Apps	(Gls)
2018–	Croatia	12	(31)
Medal record
Junior World Championship
Silver medal – second place	2019 Spain
U-18 European Championship
Silver medal – second place	2016 Croatia
2018 Mediterranean Games
Gold medal – first place	2018 Spain

Halil Jaganjac (born 22 June 1998) is a Croatian handball player who plays for Rhein-Neckar Löwen and the Croatian national team.

== Career ==
Jaganjac was born in Rijeka to Bosnian parents. His father hails from Bosanski Petrovac, and his mother hails from Prusac near Donji Vakuf. He rose through the ranks of his home-town club MRK Kozala, starting his professional career with the club in 2014–15. In July 2016, Jaganjac was transferred to Paris Saint-Germain, signing a three-year contract with the club. In June 2017, Jaganjac was called up by Lino Červar to the Croatia national team.

== Awards and accomplishments ==
=== Club ===
MRK Kozala

- Croatian League (youth): 2015–16

=== Individual ===
RK Metalurg Skopje

- SEHA League top scorer: 2017–18
- Macedonian Cup top scorer: 2017–18
