= Ahmed Bedoui =

Tunisian handball player

Personal information
- Nationality: Tunisian
- Born: 1 December 1993 (age 32) Teboulba, Tunisia
- Height: 1.93 m (6 ft 4 in)

Sport
- Sport: Handball
- Position: Goalkeeper
- Current club: Espérance Sportive de Tunis
- Number: 1
National team
| Years | Team | Apps | (Gls) |
| – | Tunisia | 15 | (0) |
Medal record
Mediterranean Games
| Silver medal – second place | 2018 Tarragona | Team |

Ahmed Bedoui (born 1 December 1993) is a Tunisian handball player who plays for Espérance Sportive de Tunis and the Tunisian national team.

He represented Tunisia at the 2019 World Men's Handball Championship.
