= Omar Hagag =

Egyptian handball player

Personal information
- Nationality: Egyptian
- Born: 13 March 1990 (age 36) cairo
- Height: 1.96 m (6 ft 5 in)

Sport
- Sport: Handball
- Position: Left back
- Current club: mleha uae
- Number: 90
National team
Years	Team	Apps
–	Egypt	199

Omar Hagag (born 13 March 1990) is an Egyptian handball player for Mleha and the Egyptian national team.

He represented Egypt at the 2019 World Men's Handball Championship.
