= Youssef Maaref =

Tunisian handball player

Youssef Maaraf
Personal information
- Nationality: Tunisian
- Born: 21 July 1996 (age 30) Mahdia, Tunisia
- Height: 1.95 m (6 ft 5 in)

Sport
- Sport: Handball
- Position: Left back
- Current club: Al-Ahli SC
- Number: 22
National team
Years	Team	Apps	(Gls)
–	Tunisia	21	(15)
Medal record
African Championships
Bronze medal – third place	2024 Egypt
Mediterranean Games
Silver medal – second place	2018 Tarragona	Team

Youssef Maaraf (born 21 July 1996) is a Tunisian handball player for Al-Ahli SC and the Tunisian national team. He represented Tunisia at the 2019 World Men's Handball Championship.
