= Khaled Haj Youssef =

Tunisian handball player

Personal information
- Nationality: Tunisian
- Born: 12 January 1989 (age 37)
- Height: 1.89 m (6 ft 2 in)

Sport
- Sport: Handball
- Position: Centre back
- Current club: Al Sadd
National team
Years	Team	Apps	(Gls)
–	Tunisia	88	(57)
Medal record
African Championship
Gold medal – first place	2018 Gabon
Silver medal – second place	2020 Tunisia
Mediterranean Games
Silver medal – second place	2018 Tarragona	Team

Khaled Haj Youssef (born 12 January 1989) is a Tunisian handball player for Al Sadd and the Tunisian national team.

He participated at the 2016 Summer Olympics.
