= André Gomes (handballer) =

Portuguese handball player (born 1998)

Personal information
- Full name: André Dias Lopes Gomes
- Nationality: Portuguese
- Born: 27 July 1998 (age 28) Braga, Portugal
- Height: 1.92 m (6 ft 4 in)

Sport
- Sport: Handball
- Position: Left back
- Current club: Dinamo București
- Number: 27

Senior clubs
- Years: Team
- 2015–2017: ABC Braga
- 2017–2021: FC Porto
- 2021–2023: MT Melsungen
- 2023: Al Safa
- 2024–: Dinamo București
National team
| Years | Team | Apps | (Gls) |
| 2018– | Portugal | 60 | (158) |
- Updated on 18 July 2023

André Dias Lopes Gomes (pronounced [ɐ̃ˈdɾɛ ˈɣomɨʃ]; born 27 July 1998) is a Portuguese handball player for Dinamo București and the Portuguese national team.

He represented Portugal at the 2020 European Men's Handball Championship and the 2021 World Men's Handball Championship.
