= Daniel Dujshebaev =

Spanish handball player (born 1997)

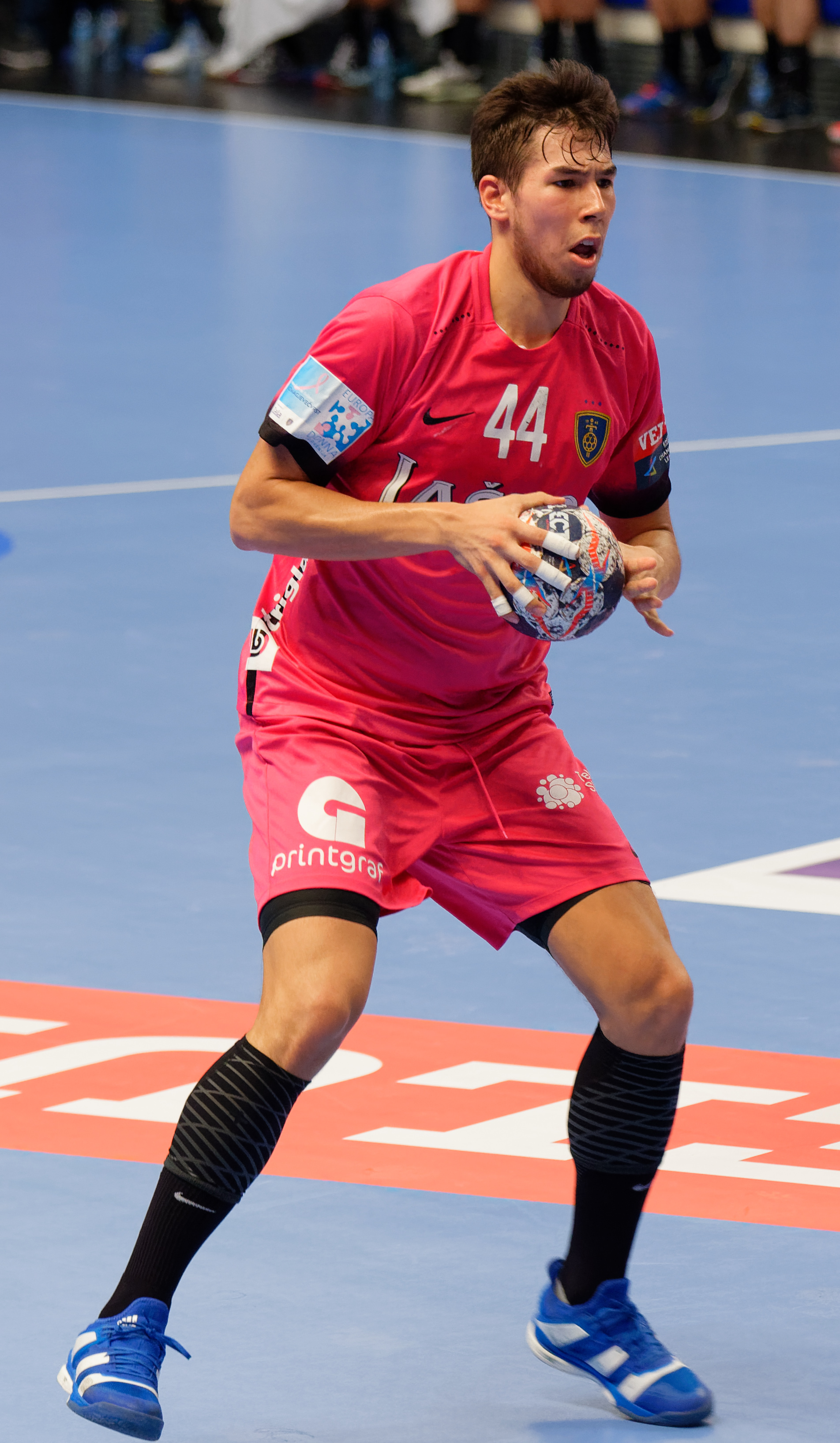
- Dujshebaev in 2017

Personal information
- Full name: Daniel Dujshebaev Dobichebaeva
- Nationality: Spanish
- Born: 4 July 1997 (age 29) Santander, Spain
- Height: 1.97 m (6 ft 6 in)

Sport
- Sport: Handball
- Position: Left back
- Current club: Industria Kielce
- Number: 44

Youth career
- Years: Team
- –: BM Ciudad Real
- –2013: BM Atlético Madrid
- 2013–2016: FC Barcelona Lassa B

Senior clubs
- Years: Team
- 2016–2017: → Atlético Valladolid (loan)
- 2017–2026: Industria Kielce
- 2017–2018: → RK Celje (loan)
- 2026–: MT Melsungen
National team
| Years | Team | Apps | (Gls) |
| 2017– | Spain | 41 | (63) |
Medal record
Olympic Games
| Bronze medal – third place | 2024 Paris | Team |
World Championship
| Bronze medal – third place | 2021 Egypt |
| Bronze medal – third place | 2023 Poland/Sweden |
European Championship
| Gold medal – first place | 2018 Croatia |
| Gold medal – first place | 2020 Sweden/Austria/Norway |
Mediterranean Games
| Bronze medal – third place | 2018 Tarragona | Team |

Daniel Dujshebaev Dobichebaeva (Russian: Daniel Talantovič Dujshebaev/Даниел Талантович Дуйшебаев; born 4 December 1997) is a Spanish handball player for Industria Kielce and the Spanish national team.

== Personal life ==
His mother is of Russian descent, and his father, Talant Dujshebaev who is a former handball player and current coach, is of Kyrgyz descent. His brother Alex Dujshebaev is also a handball player.
