= Adnan Radnah =

Saudi Arabian handball player

Personal information
- Nationality: Saudi Arabian
- Born: 19 December 1991 (age 34)
- Height: 1.91 m (6 ft 3 in)

Sport
- Sport: Handball
- Position: Pivot
- Current club: Al-Ahli
National team
Years	Team	Apps	(Gls)
2019–	Saudi Arabia	3	(1)

Adnan Radnah (born 19 December 1991) is a Saudi handball player for Al-Ahli and the Saudi Arabian national team.

He represented Saudi Arabia at the 2019 World Men's Handball Championship.
