= Manuel Crivelli =

Argentine handball player

Personal information
- Nationality: Argentine
- Born: 18 October 1993 (age 33)
- Height: 1.78 m (5 ft 10 in)

Sport
- Sport: Handball
- Position: Centre back
- Current club: Cavigal Nice Handball
- Number: 4
National team
Years	Team	Apps	(Gls)
–	Argentina	21	(36)
Medal record
South and Central American Championship
Gold medal – first place	2020 Brazil

Manuel Crivelli (born 18 October 1993) is an Argentine handball player for Cavigal Nice Handball and the Argentine national team.

He represented Argentina at the 2019 World Men's Handball Championship.
