= Kauldi Odriozola =

Spanish handball player (born 1997)

Personal information
- Full name: Kauldi Odriozola Yeregui
- Nationality: Spanish
- Born: 7 January 1997 (age 29) Zumaia, Spain
- Height: 1.82 m (6 ft 0 in)

Sport
- Sport: Handball
- Position: Right winger
- Current club: HBC Nantes
- Number: 19

Youth career
- Years: Team
- –2016: Pulpo KE

Senior clubs
- Years: Team
- 2016–2022: Bidasoa Irún
- 2022–: HBC Nantes
National team
Years	Team	Apps	(Gls)
2018–	Spain	75	(200)
Medal record
Olympic Games
Bronze medal – third place	2024 Paris	Team
World Championship
Bronze medal – third place	2023 Poland/Sweden
European Championship
Silver medal – second place	2022 Hungary/Slovakia
Mediterranean Games
Gold medal – first place	2022 Oran	Team
Bronze medal – third place	2018 Tarragona	Team
Junior World Championship
Gold medal – first place	2017 Algeria
U-20 European Championship
Gold medal – first place	2016 Denmark
- Updated on 13 January 2025

Kauldi Odriozola Yeregui (born 7 January 1997) is a Spanish handball player who plays for HBC Nantes and the Spanish national team.

== Club career ==
Odriozola learned to play handball at Pulpo KE in Zumaia. For the 2016/17 season, he moved to the first division club Bidasoa Irún, for whom he scored 554 goals in 141 games in the Liga ASOBAL until the summer of 2022. After his first season, he was voted the best newcomer in the league. In the 2017/18 and 2018/19 seasons, he was voted the best right winger in the All-Star team of the Spanish league.

For the 2022/23 season, Odriozola signed a four-year contract with the French club HBC Nantes. In the 2022/23 season, he won the Trophée des Champions, the LNH Supercup, and the Coupe de France. In 2024, he won the Coupe de France again.

== International career ==
Odriozola made his debut for the Spanish national team on 7 April 2018 against Tunisia. At the 2018 Mediterranean Games, he won the bronze medal with Spain. At the 2022 European Championship, he scored three goals in five games and won the silver medal with the team. At the 2022 Mediterranean Games, he won the gold medal again with Spain. He took part in a World Championship for the first time in January 2023 in Poland and Sweden. He won the bronze medal with the Spanish selection for the 2023 World Championship. At the 2024 European Championship, he was injured after the second game.

By July 2024, Odriozola had played 62 international matches, in which he scored 173 goals.

== Honors ==
HBC Nantes

- Coupe de France: 2022–23, 2023–24
- Trophée des Champions: 2022–23
