= Ryusei Okamoto =

Japanese handball player (born 1993)

Personal information
- Nationality: Japanese
- Born: 1 November 1993 (age 32)
- Height: 1.92 m (6 ft 4 in)

Sport
- Sport: Handball
- Position: Pivot
- Current club: Toyota Auto Body
National team
| Years | Team | Apps | (Gls) |
| 2019– | Japan | 7 | (3) |
Medal record
Asian Championship
| Bronze medal – third place | 2020 Kuwait |

Ryusei Okamoto (born 1 November 1993) is a Japanese handball player for Toyota Auto Body and the Japanese national team.

He represented Japan at the 2019 World Men's Handball Championship.
