= Yuki Kubo =

Japanese handball player (born 1988)

Personal information
- Nationality: Japanese
- Born: 24 May 1988 (age 38)
- Height: 1.86 m (6 ft 1 in)

Sport
- Sport: Handball
- Position: Goalkeeper
- Current club: Daido Steel
National team
| Years | Team | Apps | (Gls) |
| – | Japan | 38 | (1) |
Medal record
Asian Championship
| Bronze medal – third place | 2020 Kuwait |

Yuki Kubo (born 24 May 1988) is a Japanese handball player for Daido Steel and the Japanese national team.

He represented Japan at the 2019 World Men's Handball Championship.
