= Francisco Almeida =

Angolan handball player

Personal information
- Nationality: Angolan
- Born: 5 June 1995 (age 31)
- Height: 1.90 m (6 ft 3 in)

Sport
- Sport: Handball
- Position: Left back
- Current club: Primeiro de Agosto
National team
| Years | Team | Apps | (Gls) |
| 2019– | Angola | 6 | (0) |

Francisco Almeida (born 5 June 1995) is an Angolan handball player for Primeiro de Agosto and the Angolan national team.

He represented Angola at the 2019 World Men's Handball Championship.
