= Makrem Missaoui =

Tunisian handball player

Personal information
- Nationality: Tunisian
- Born: 14 February 1981 (age 45) Tunis, Tunisia
- Height: 1.88 m (6 ft 2 in)

Sport
- Sport: Handball
- Position: Goalkeeper
- Current club: CS Dinamo București
- Number: 1
National team
Years	Team	Apps	(Gls)
–	Tunisia	196	(4)
Medal record
African Championship
Gold medal – first place	2018 Gabon
Silver medal – second place	2020 Tunisia
Mediterranean Games
Silver medal – second place	2018 Tarragona	Team

Makrem Missaoui (born 14 February 1981) is a Tunisian handball player for CS Dinamo București and the Tunisian national team.

He played for the Tunisia men's national handball team at the 2016 Summer Olympics in Rio de Janeiro, in the men's handball tournament.
