= Mohamed Maher =

Egyptian handball player

Personal information
- Nationality: Egyptian
- Born: 26 May 1992 (age 34)
- Height: 1.95 m (6 ft 5 in)

Sport
- Sport: Handball
- Position: Pivot
- Current club: Al Ahly
National team
Years	Team	Apps
–	Egypt	26

Mohamed Maher (born 26 May 1992) is an Egyptian handball player for Al Gazira and the Egyptian national team.

He represented Egypt at the 2019 World Men's Handball Championship.
