= Mosbah Sanaï =

Tunisian handball player (born 1991)

Personal information
- Nationality: Tunisian
- Born: 26 March 1991 (age 35) Medenine, Tunisia
- Height: 1.92 m (6 ft 4 in)

Sport
- Sport: Handball
- Position: Left back
- Current club: Sharjah Cultural Sports Club
- Number: 19
National team
Years	Team	Apps	(Gls)
2011–	Tunisia	117	(351)
Medal record
African Championship
Gold medal – first place	2012 Morocco
Silver medal – second place	2020 Tunisia
Bronze medal – third place	2024 Egypt
Mediterranean Games
Silver medal – second place	2018 Tarragona	Team
Junior World Championship
Bronze medal – third place	2011 Greece

Mosbah Sanaï (Arabic: مصباح الصانعي; born 26 March 1991) is a Tunisian handball player for Sharjah Cultural Sports Club and the Tunisian national team.

He competed for the Tunisian national team at the 2013 World Championship in Spain, where the Tunisian team finished eleventh.

== Honours ==
=== National team ===
African Championship

- Winner: 2012 Morocco (27 goals)
- Runners-up: 2014 Algeria

Junior World Championship

- Bronze Medalist: 2011 Greece (36 goals)

=== Club ===
Tunisia National League

- (gold) Winner: 2011

Tunisia National Cup

- (gold) Winner: 2010

IHF Super Globe

- Bronze Medalist: 2013 Qatar

African Super Cup

- Winner: 2013 Sousse
- Runners-up: 2011 Yaoundé

African Champions League

- Winner: 2010 Casablanca
- Runners-up: 2011 Kaduna

Asian Champions League

- Winner: 2013 Doha

African Cup Winners' Cup

- Winner: 2012 Tunis
- Bronze medalist: 2013 Hammamet

Arab Championship of Champions

- (bronze) Bronze medalist: 2013 Saudi Arabia

Gulf Club Championship

- (gold) Winner: 2014 Saudi Arabia
- (bronze) Bronze medalist: 2013 Bahrain
