= Marouan Chouiref =

Tunisian handball player (born 1990)

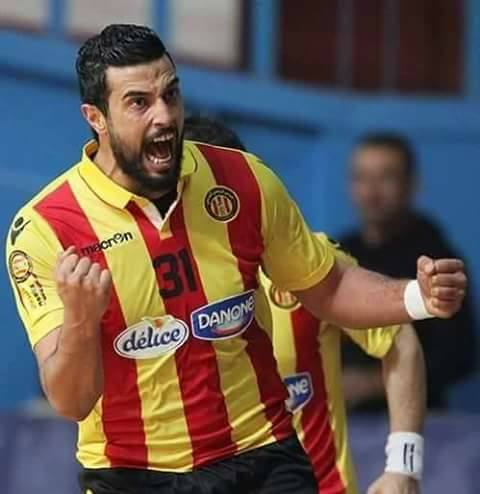

Personal information
- Nationality: Tunisian
- Born: 27 May 1990 (age 36) Mahdia, Tunisia
- Height: 1.97 m (6 ft 6 in)

Sport
- Sport: Handball
- Position: Pivot
- Current club: RK Vojvodina
National team
Years	Team	Apps	(Gls)
–	Tunisia	142	(241)
Medal record
African Championship
Gold medal – first place	2018 Gabon
Bronze medal – third place	2024 Egypt
Mediterranean Games
Silver medal – second place	2018 Tarragona	Team
Junior World Championship
Bronze medal – third place	2011 Greece

Marouan Chouiref (born 27 May 1990) is a Tunisian handball player for Tremblay-en-France and the Tunisian national team.

At the 2012 and 2016 Summer Olympics he competed with the Tunisia national team in the men's tournament.

== Honours ==
=== National team ===
Junior World Championship

- Bronze Medalist: 2011 Greece

=== Club ===
Arab Club Championship

- (gold) Winner: Berkane 2012

Tunisia National Cup

- (gold) Winner: 2011
