= Ramzi Majdoub =

Tunisian handball player (born 1993)

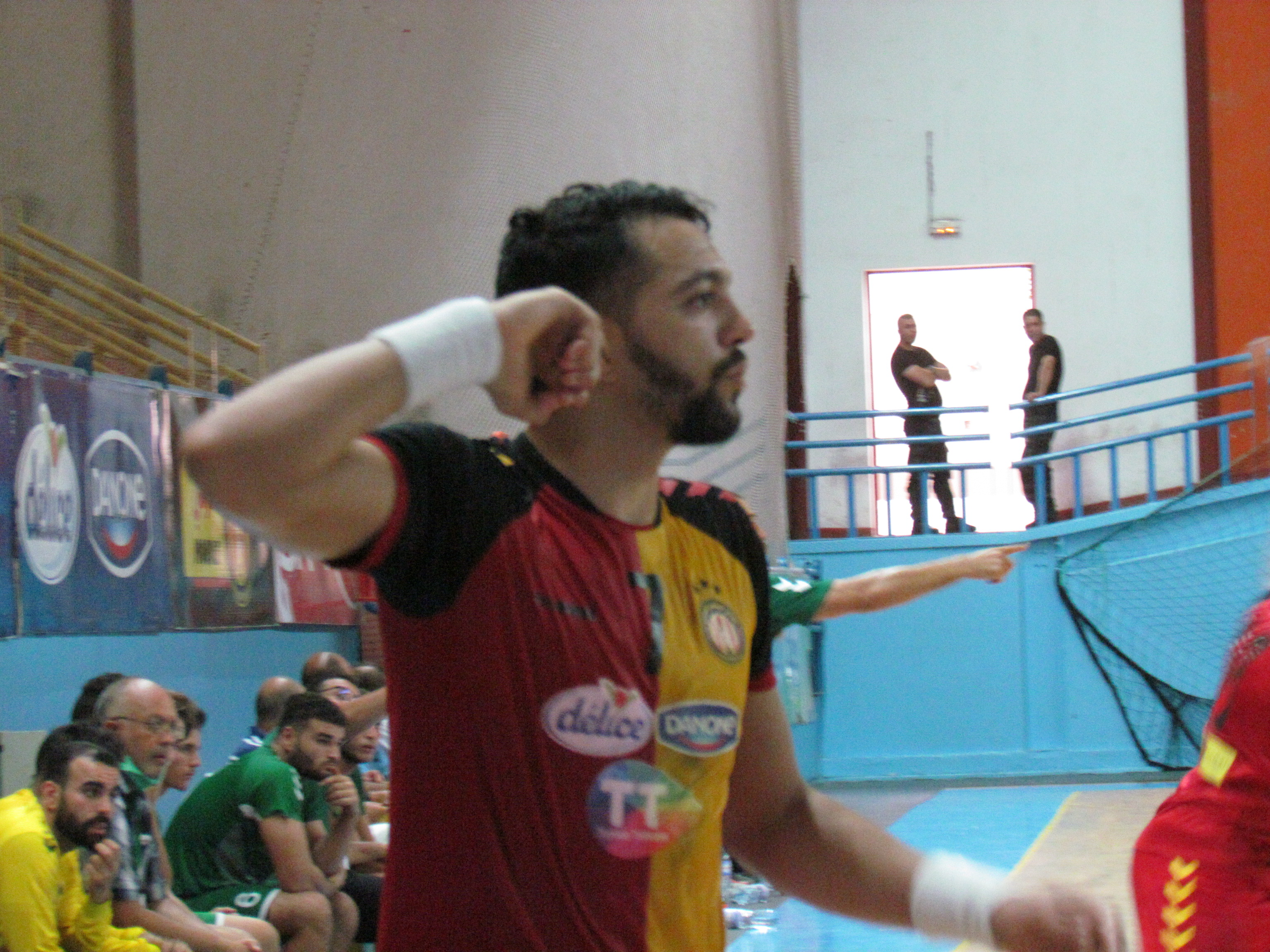

Personal information
- Nationality: Tunisian
- Born: 9 May 1993 (age 33)
- Height: 1.88 m (6 ft 2 in)

Sport
- Sport: Handball
- Position: Right wing
- Current club: RK Crvena zvezda
- Number: 7
National team
| Years | Team | Apps | (Gls) |
| – | Tunisia | 21 | (41) |
Medal record
African Championship
| Silver medal – second place | 2020 Tunisia |
Mediterranean Games
| Silver medal – second place | 2018 Tarragona | Team |

Ramzi Majdoub (Arabic: رمزي محجوب; born 9 May 1993) is a Tunisian handball player for Crvena zvezda and the Tunisian national team.

He represented Tunisia at the 2019 World Men's Handball Championship.
