= Josip Božić Pavletić =

Croatian handball player (born 1994)

Personal information
- Nationality: Croatian
- Born: 6 August 1994 (age 32) Split, Croatia
- Height: 1.88 m (6 ft 2 in)

Sport
- Sport: Handball
- Position: Right wing
- Current club: Tremblay-en-France
- Number: 32

Senior clubs
- Years: Team
- 2012–2017: RK Nexe
- 2017–2021: RK Zagreb
- 2021: Frisch Auf Göppingen
- 2021–2022: RK Eurofarm Pelister
- 2022–2024: Tremblay-en-France
- 2024–2025: Istres Provence Handball
National team
Years	Team	Apps	(Gls)
–	Croatia	19	(32)
Medal record
Mediterranean Games
Gold medal – first place	2018 Tarragona	Team

Josip Božić Pavletić (born 6 August 1994) is a Croatian handball player who plays for Tremblay-en-France and the Croatian national team.

He participated at the 2017 World Men's Handball Championship.
