= Ángel Fernández Pérez =

Spanish handball player (born 1988)

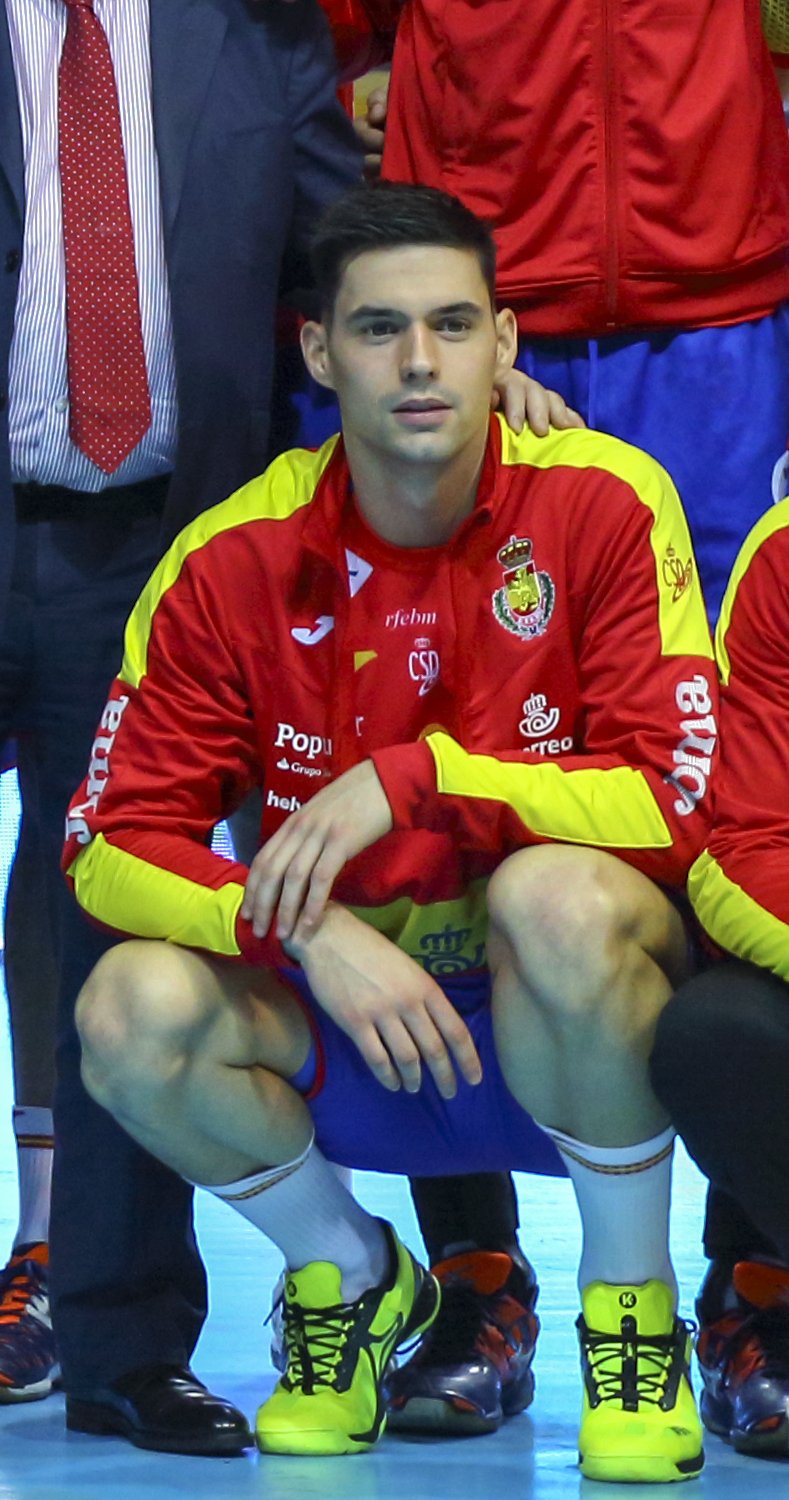
- Pérez in 2018

Personal information
- Nationality: Spanish
- Born: 16 September 1988 (age 38) El Astillero, Spain
- Height: 1.92 m (6 ft 4 in)

Sport
- Sport: Handball
- Position: Left wing
- Current club: BM Torrelavega
- Number: 32

Youth career
- Years: Team
- 1994–: SDC Astillero

Senior clubs
- Years: Team
- 2006–2008: CB Cantabria
- 2008–2013: CD Torrebalonmano
- 2013–2018: CBM Logroño La Rioja
- 2018–2021: Łomża Vive Kielce
- 2021–2022: FC Barcelona
- 2022–2024: Limoges Handball
- 2024–: BM Torrelavega
National team
Years	Team	Apps	(Gls)
2012–2014	Spain (beach)	29	(66)
2015–	Spain (hall)	129	(373)
Medal record
Olympic Games
Bronze medal – third place	2020 Tokyo	Team
World Championship
Bronze medal – third place	2021 Egypt
Bronze medal – third place	2023 Poland/Sweden
European Championship
Gold medal – first place	2018 Croatia
Gold medal – first place	2020 Sweden/Austria/Norway
Silver medal – second place	2022 Hungary/Slovakia
Mediterranean Games
Bronze medal – third place	2018 Tarragona	Team
- Updated on 30 October 2026

Ángel Fernández Pérez (born 16 September 1988) is a Spanish handball player for Limoges Handball and the Spanish national team. With the Spanish national team he has won the European Championship twice, in 2018 and 2020.

In addition to regular handball, he also played beach handball.

== Career ==
Ángel Fernández started playing handball at his home town club SDC Astillero, before joining CB Cantabria in 2006, where he made his senior debut. In 2008 he left the team, as the club was disbanded. He ten joined 3. league team CD Torrebalonmano, where he was promoted to the 2nd tier in the first season. In 2013 he left for CBM Logroño La Rioja, where he came second in the league in 2014, 2015 and 2016 and reached the cup final in 2017 and 2018. Three times he was included in the league all star team.

In 2018 he joined Polish top team Vive Kielce. Under coach Talant Dujshebaev he won the 2019, 2020 and 2021 Polish championship and the 2019 and 2021 Polish cup. In the 2018-19 EHF Champions League he reached the Final Four, where the team lost in the semifinal to Telekom Veszprém.

In 2021 he left Kielce to return to Spain, where he joined FC Barcelona. Here he won the 2021-22 EHF Champions League and the 2021-22 Liga ASOBAL.

A year later he joined French side Limoges Handball. He left the club in 2024. He then returned to CD Torrebalonmano after 11 years away. Here he signed a deal until 2027.

=== National team ===
Ángel Fernández debuted for the Spanish national team on 29 April 2015 against Germany.

His first major international tournament was the 2017 World Men's Handball Championship, where Spain finished 5th. At the 2018 European Men's Handball Championship he won gold medals, the first ever for Spain. He was however replaced by Aitor Ariño after the first game. At his second World Championship in 2019, he finished 7th with Spain.

A year later he won his second gold medal at the 2020 European Men's Handball Championship.

At his third World Championship in 2021, he won a bronze medal. Later the same year he represented Spain at the 2021 Olympics, where he won another bronze medal.

At the 2022 European Men's Handball Championship he won a silver medal, when Spain lost to Sweden in the final. A year later he won a bronze medal at the 2023 World Men's Handball Championship.

== Individual awards ==
- All Star Team as Best Left Wing at the 2023 World Championship
