= Milan Milić =

Serbian handball player (born 1998)

Personal information
- Nationality: Serbian
- Born: 14 May 1998 (age 28) Aleksandrovac, Serbia, FR Yugoslavia
- Height: 1.99 m (6 ft 6 in)

Sport
- Sport: Handball
- Position: Right back
- Current club: RK Vojvodina
- Number: 6

Senior clubs
- Years: Team
- –2020: RK Metaloplastika
- 2020–2022: HBC Nantes
- 2022: RK Zagreb
- 2022–: RK Vojvodina
National team
Years	Team	Apps	(Gls)
–	Serbia	13	(26)
Medal record
Mediterranean Games
Bronze medal – third place	2022 Oran	Team

Milan Milić (born 14 May 1998) is a Serbian handball player who plays for RK Vojvodina and the Serbian national team.

He represented Serbia at the 2019 World Men's Handball Championship.
