= David Mandić =

Croatian handball player (born 1997)

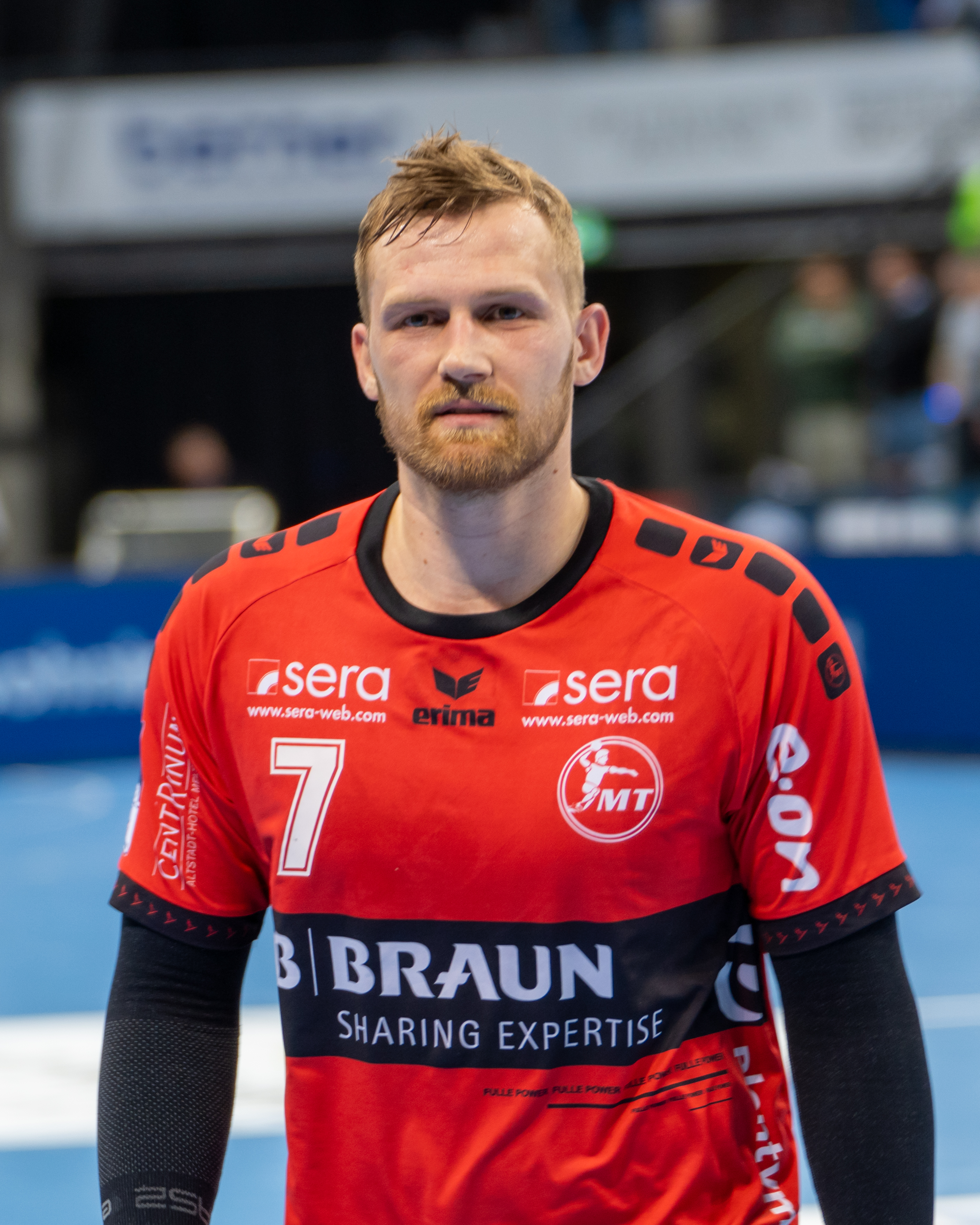

Personal information
- Nationality: Croatian
- Born: 14 September 1997 (age 29) Ljubuški, Bosnia and Herzegovina
- Height: 1.87 m (6 ft 2 in)

Sport
- Sport: Handball
- Position: Left wing
- Current club: MT Melsungen
- Number: 7

Youth career
- Years: Team
- –: RK Izviđač

Senior clubs
- Years: Team
- –2018: RK Izviđač
- 2018–2022: RK Zagreb
- 2022–: MT Melsungen
National team
Years	Team	Apps	(Gls)
2017–	Croatia	71	(168)
Medal record
Men's handball
Representing Croatia
World Championship
Silver medal – second place	2025 Croatia/Denmark/Norway
European Championship
Silver medal – second place	2020 Sweden/Austria/Norway
Bronze medal – third place	2026 Denmark/Norway/Sweden
Mediterranean Games
Gold medal – first place	2018 Tarragona	Team
- Updated on 2 February 2026

David Mandić (born 14 September 1997) is a handball player for MT Melsungen and the Croatian national team.

He is the cousin of fellow handball player Matej Mandić, who also comes from Hardomilje near Ljubuški. They have played together at both RK Izviđač and at RK Zagreb.

Mandić participated at the 2019 World Men's Handball Championship. At the 2026 European Men's Handball Championship he won bronze medals with Croatia, losing to Germany in the semifinal and beating Iceland in the third-place playoff.

== Honours ==
HRK Izviđač

- Handball Championship of Bosnia and Herzegovina: 2015–16

Croatia

- Mediterranean Games: 2018

MT Melsungen

- EHF European League: Gold: 2026
