= Rafik Bacha =

Tunisian handball player

Personal information
- Nationality: Tunisian
- Born: 4 December 1989 (age 36) Menzel Temime, Tunisia
- Height: 1.88 m (6 ft 2 in)

Sport
- Sport: Handball
- Position: Left wing
- Current club: Club Africain
- Number: 89
National team
Years	Team	Apps	(Gls)
–	Tunisia	35	(113)
Medal record
African Championship
Silver medal – second place	2020 Tunisia
Mediterranean Games
Silver medal – second place	2018 Tarragona	Team

Rafik Bacha (born 4 December 1989) is a Tunisian handball player for Club Africain and the Tunisian national team.

He represented Tunisia at the 2019 World Men's Handball Championship.
