= Marin Šipić =

Croatian handball player (born 1996)

Personal information
- Nationality: Croatian
- Born: 29 April 1996 (age 30) Bad Soden, Germany
- Height: 1.90 m (6 ft 3 in)

Sport
- Sport: Handball
- Position: Pivot
- Current club: HC Kriens-Luzern
- Number: 22

Senior clubs
- Years: Team
- –2014: RK Split
- 2014–2017: GRK Varaždin
- 2017–2019: RK Nexe Našice
- 2019–2022: RK Zagreb
- 2022–: HC Kriens-Luzern
National team
Years	Team	Apps	(Gls)
–	Croatia	88	(181)
Medal record
World Championship
Silver medal – second place	2025 Croatia/Denmark/Norway
European Championship
Silver medal – second place	2020 Sweden/Austria/Norway
Mediterranean Games
Gold medal – first place	2018 Tarragona	Team
- Updated on 3 January 2024

Marin Šipić (born 29 April 1996) is a Croatian handball player for HC Kriens-Luzern and the Croatian national team.

He represented Croatia at the 2020 European Men's Handball Championship.
