= Iosu Goñi Leoz =

Spanish handball player (born 1990)

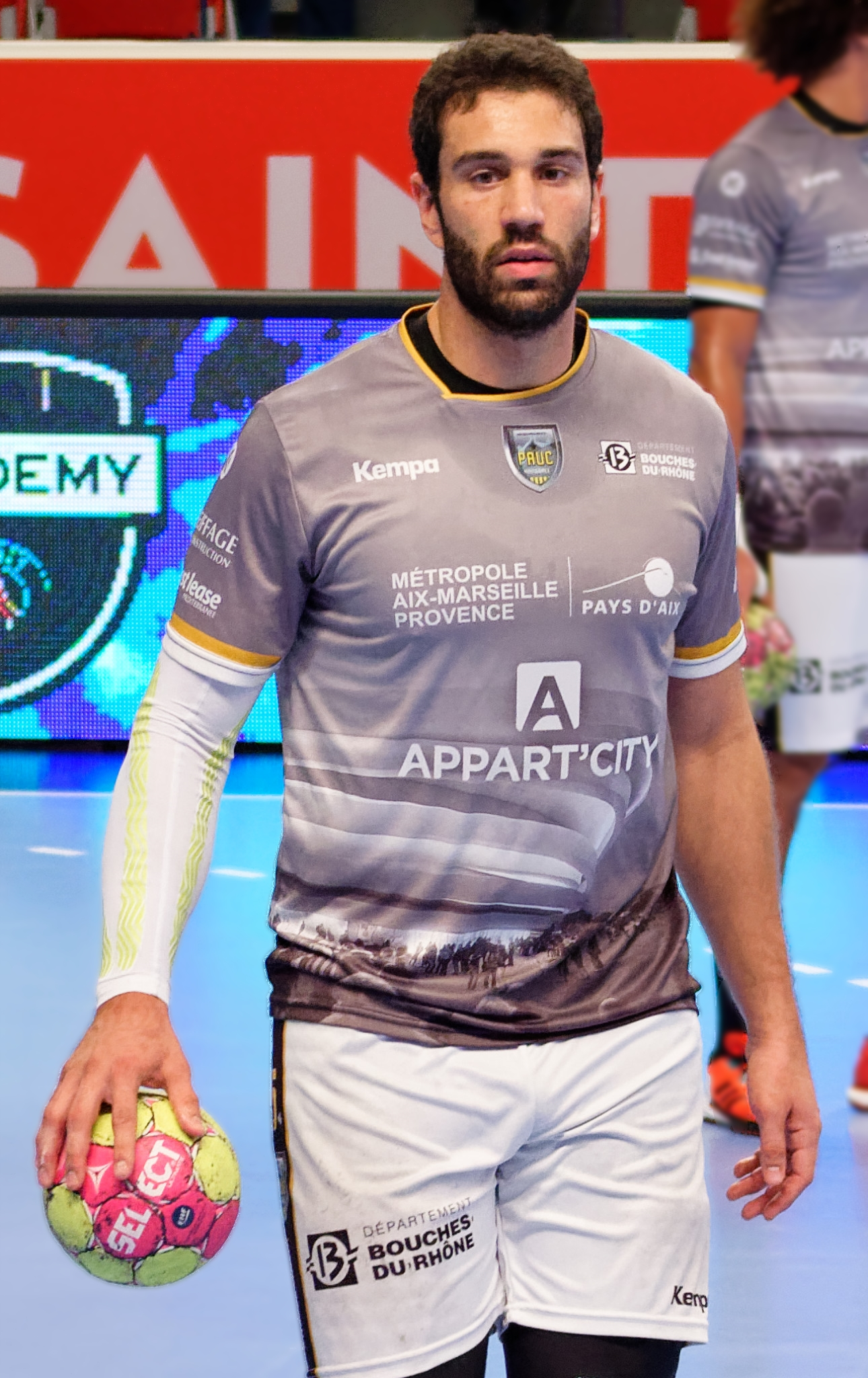

Personal information
- Nationality: Spanish
- Born: 4 January 1990 (age 36) Pamplona, Spain
- Height: 1.97 m (6 ft 6 in)

Sport
- Sport: Handball
- Position: Left back / Center back
- Current club: Chambéry Savoie Mont-Blanc Handball
- Number: 55
National team
Years	Team	Apps	(Gls)
–	Spain	69	(97)
Medal record
World Championship
Bronze medal – third place	2021 Egypt
European Championship
Gold medal – first place	2018 Croatia
Gold medal – first place	2020 Sweden/Austria/Norway
Mediterranean Games
Bronze medal – third place	2018 Tarragona	Team
- Updated on 4 November 2024

Iosu Goñi Leoz (born 4 January 1990) is a Spanish handball player for Chambéry Savoie Mont-Blanc Handball and the Spanish team.

He participated at the 2017 World Men's Handball Championship.
