= Al-Arabi (Saudi Arabia, handball club) =

^{Al-Arabi H.C}
- Full name: Al Arabi Handball Club
- Founded: 1958
- Arena: Al-Arabi Indoor Arena; Unaizah, Saudi Arabia
- Capacity: 1,000
- President: (Saudi Arabia) Abdulaziz Al Dera
- Head coach: (Bulgaria) Christopher Alice
- League: Prince Faisal bin Fahad Saudi Handball League
- 2011–12: Prince Faisal bin Fahad Saudi Handball League, 8nd
- Club colours
Home	Away

Al-Arabi H.C (Arabic: نادي العربي السعودي لكرة اليد, English: Al-Arabi Handball Club) is a Saudi Arabian handball team based in Unaizah, that plays in Prince Faisal bin Fahad Saudi Handball League.

== Honours ==
- Saudi Federation Handball Cup: 1

1983

- Saudi youth handball tournament: 1

1977

- Saudi Handball U-17 Premier League: 1

2009

- Saudi Handball League First Division: 1

2011

== Current squad ==
Last Update: May 21, 2012

Note: Flags indicate national team as defined under FIFA eligibility rules; some limited exceptions apply. Players may hold more than one non-FIFA nationality.

No.	Pos.	Nation	Player
3		KSA	Sulaiman Al-Diwani
4		KSA	Jihad Al-Salhi
5		KSA	Saleh Al-Nafisa
6		SEN	Yuseef Fall
7		KSA	Rami Al-Mutairi
9		KSA	Abdullah Al-Obaid

== See also ==
- Al-Arabi sport club
  - Al-Arabi basketball club
- Al-Arabi SC (Kuwait)
- List of handball clubs in Saudi Arabia
