= Handball at the 2018 Mediterranean Games – Men's tournament =

Men's handball at the 2018 Mediterranean Games
Tournament details
- Host country: Spain
- Venue: 1 (in 1 host city)
- Dates: 23 June – 1 July
- Teams: 13 (from 2 confederations)

Final positions
- Champions: Croatia (4th title)
- Runners-up: Tunisia
- Third place: Spain
- Fourth place: Turkey

Tournament statistics
- Matches played: 27
- Goals scored: 1,570 (58.15 per match)

The men's handball tournament at the 2018 Mediterranean Games was held from 23 June to 1 July at the Campclar Sports Palace in Tarragona.

== Participating teams ==
- Algeria
- Croatia
- Egypt
- Greece
- Italy
- North Macedonia
- Montenegro
- Portugal
- Slovenia
- Serbia
- Spain (host)
- Tunisia
- Turkey

== Group stage ==
All times are local (UTC+2).

=== Group A ===
Pos	Team	Pld	W	D	L	GF	GA	GD	Pts	Qualification
1	Tunisia	2	2	0	0	73	57	+16	4	Quarterfinals
2	Slovenia	2	1	0	1	70	61	+9	2	Quarterfinals
3	Montenegro	2	0	0	2	56	81	−25	0	

Source: Tarragona 2018
Rules for classification: 1) Points; 2) Head-to-head points; 3) Head-to-head goal difference; 4) Head-to-head goals scored; 5) Goal difference; 6) Goals scored; 7) Draw.

23 June 2018; 12:00	Slovenia	41–28	Montenegro	Campclar Sports Palace, Tarragona; Referees: El-Moamly, Abdelaziz (EGY)
23 June 2018; 12:00	Bratkovič 8	(21–11)	Kaluđerović, Radojević 8	Campclar Sports Palace, Tarragona; Referees: El-Moamly, Abdelaziz (EGY)
23 June 2018; 12:00	2× (yellow card) 4× (suspension)	Report	3× (yellow card) 3× (suspension)	Campclar Sports Palace, Tarragona; Referees: El-Moamly, Abdelaziz (EGY)

24 June 2018; 10:00	Slovenia	29–33	Tunisia	Campclar Sports Palace, Tarragona
24 June 2018; 10:00		(13–13)	Chouiref 8	Campclar Sports Palace, Tarragona
24 June 2018; 10:00			3× (yellow card) 4× (suspension)	Campclar Sports Palace, Tarragona

25 June 2018; 12:00	Montenegro	28–40	Tunisia	Campclar Sports Palace, Tarragona; Referees: Jurinović, Mrvica (CRO)
25 June 2018; 12:00	Radović 5	(10–16)	Majdoub 6	Campclar Sports Palace, Tarragona; Referees: Jurinović, Mrvica (CRO)
25 June 2018; 12:00	3× (yellow card) 1× (suspension)	Report	3× (yellow card) 1× (suspension)	Campclar Sports Palace, Tarragona; Referees: Jurinović, Mrvica (CRO)

=== Group B ===
Pos	Team	Pld	W	D	L	GF	GA	GD	Pts	Qualification
1	Croatia	2	2	0	0	67	52	+15	4	Quarterfinals
2	Algeria	2	1	0	1	64	69	−5	2	Quarterfinals
3	Italy	2	0	0	2	58	68	−10	0	

Source: Tarragona 2018
Rules for classification: 1) Points; 2) Head-to-head points; 3) Head-to-head goal difference; 4) Head-to-head goals scored; 5) Goal difference; 6) Goals scored; 7) Draw.

23 June 2018; 10:00	Croatia	30–26	Italy	Campclar Sports Palace, Tarragona; Referees: Hoz, Riloba (ESP)
23 June 2018; 10:00	Jaganjac 8	(17–12)	Turkovic 6	Campclar Sports Palace, Tarragona; Referees: Hoz, Riloba (ESP)
23 June 2018; 10:00	3× (yellow card) 3× (suspension)	Report	2× (yellow card) 1× (suspension)	Campclar Sports Palace, Tarragona; Referees: Hoz, Riloba (ESP)

24 June 2018; 12:00	Croatia	37–26	Algeria	Campclar Sports Palace, Tarragona; Referees: Macías, Ruiz (ESP)
24 June 2018; 12:00	Mandić 7	(19–13)	Abdi 7	Campclar Sports Palace, Tarragona; Referees: Macías, Ruiz (ESP)
24 June 2018; 12:00	1× (yellow card) 6× (suspension)	Report	2× (yellow card) 4× (suspension)	Campclar Sports Palace, Tarragona; Referees: Macías, Ruiz (ESP)

25 June 2018; 10:00	Italy	32–38	Algeria	Campclar Sports Palace, Tarragona; Referees: Jovandić, Sekulić (SRB)
25 June 2018; 10:00	Marrochi 7	(15–16)	Berkous 11	Campclar Sports Palace, Tarragona; Referees: Jovandić, Sekulić (SRB)
25 June 2018; 10:00	3× (yellow card) 2× (suspension)	Report	3× (yellow card) 4× (suspension)	Campclar Sports Palace, Tarragona; Referees: Jovandić, Sekulić (SRB)

=== Group C ===
Pos	Team	Pld	W	D	L	GF	GA	GD	Pts	Qualification
1	Spain (H)	2	2	0	0	80	39	+41	4	Quarterfinals
2	Portugal	2	0	1	1	50	62	−12	1 (Note: Greece 28–28 Portugal)	Quarterfinals
3	Greece	2	0	1	1	45	74	−29	1	

Source: Tarragona 2018
Rules for classification: 1) Points; 2) Head-to-head points; 3) Head-to-head goal difference; 4) Head-to-head goals scored; 5) Goal difference; 6) Goals scored; 7) Draw.
(H) Hosts
Notes:

23 June 2018; 20:30	Spain	46–17	Greece	Campclar Sports Palace, Tarragona; Referees: Ivanović, Vujisić (MNE)
23 June 2018; 20:30	Fernández, Goñi 6	(21–6)	Iliopoulos, Karampourniotis 3	Campclar Sports Palace, Tarragona; Referees: Ivanović, Vujisić (MNE)
23 June 2018; 20:30	2× (yellow card) 1× (suspension)	Report	3× (yellow card) 4× (suspension)	Campclar Sports Palace, Tarragona; Referees: Ivanović, Vujisić (MNE)

24 June 2018; 20:30	Spain	34–22	Portugal	Campclar Sports Palace, Tarragona; Referees: Jovandić, Sekulić (SRB)
24 June 2018; 20:30	Fernández 6	(14–12)	Gomes 6	Campclar Sports Palace, Tarragona; Referees: Jovandić, Sekulić (SRB)
24 June 2018; 20:30	2× (yellow card) 1× (suspension)	Report	3× (yellow card) 2× (suspension)	Campclar Sports Palace, Tarragona; Referees: Jovandić, Sekulić (SRB)

25 June 2018; 20:30	Greece	28–28	Portugal	Campclar Sports Palace, Tarragona; Referees: Soria, Monjo (ESP)
25 June 2018; 20:30	Kritikos 6	(14–11)	D. Silva 8	Campclar Sports Palace, Tarragona; Referees: Soria, Monjo (ESP)
25 June 2018; 20:30	2× (yellow card) 6× (suspension) 1× (red card)	Report	2× (yellow card) 5× (suspension)	Campclar Sports Palace, Tarragona; Referees: Soria, Monjo (ESP)

=== Group D ===
Pos	Team	Pld	W	D	L	GF	GA	GD	Pts	Qualification
1	Turkey	3	2	1	0	84	74	+10	5	Quarterfinals
2	Serbia	3	1	1	1	95	88	+7	3	Quarterfinals
3	Egypt	3	1	0	2	91	102	−11	2 (Note: Egypt 34–29 Macedonia)	
4	North Macedonia	3	1	0	2	86	92	−6	2	

Source: Tarragona 2018
Rules for classification: 1) Points; 2) Head-to-head points; 3) Head-to-head goal difference; 4) Head-to-head goals scored; 5) Goal difference; 6) Goals scored; 7) Draw.
Notes:

23 June 2018; 16:30	North Macedonia	26–29	Turkey	Campclar Sports Palace, Tarragona; Referees: Jurinović, Mrvica (CRO)
23 June 2018; 16:30	Kuzmanovski, Popovski 7	(13–15)	Pehlivan 10	Campclar Sports Palace, Tarragona; Referees: Jurinović, Mrvica (CRO)
23 June 2018; 16:30	2× (yellow card) 1× (suspension)	Report	2× (yellow card) 5× (suspension) 1× (red card)	Campclar Sports Palace, Tarragona; Referees: Jurinović, Mrvica (CRO)

23 June 2018; 18:30	Egypt	33–42	Serbia	Campclar Sports Palace, Tarragona; Referees: Deche, Ghouarda (ALG)
23 June 2018; 18:30	Mahmoud 13	(11–18)	Sretenović, Vorkapić 7	Campclar Sports Palace, Tarragona; Referees: Deche, Ghouarda (ALG)
23 June 2018; 18:30	2× (yellow card) 4× (suspension)	Report	3× (yellow card) 7× (suspension)	Campclar Sports Palace, Tarragona; Referees: Deche, Ghouarda (ALG)

24 June 2018; 16:30	Egypt	34–29	North Macedonia	Campclar Sports Palace, Tarragona; Referees: Soria, Monjo (ESP)
24 June 2018; 16:30	Hassanein 8	(19–18)	Popovski, Velkovski 6	Campclar Sports Palace, Tarragona; Referees: Soria, Monjo (ESP)
24 June 2018; 16:30	2× (yellow card) 2× (suspension)	Report	1× (yellow card) 9× (suspension) 1× (red card)	Campclar Sports Palace, Tarragona; Referees: Soria, Monjo (ESP)

24 June 2018; 18:30	Serbia	24–24	Turkey	Campclar Sports Palace, Tarragona; Referees: Alperan, Scevola (ITA)
24 June 2018; 18:30	Sretenović 8	(13–14)	Sarak 8	Campclar Sports Palace, Tarragona; Referees: Alperan, Scevola (ITA)
24 June 2018; 18:30	3× (yellow card) 3× (suspension)	Report	3× (yellow card) 5× (suspension)	Campclar Sports Palace, Tarragona; Referees: Alperan, Scevola (ITA)

25 June 2018; 16:30	Egypt	24–31	Turkey	Campclar Sports Palace, Tarragona; Referees: Hoz, Riloba (ESP)
25 June 2018; 16:30	Dahroug 6	(13–15)	Sarak 7	Campclar Sports Palace, Tarragona; Referees: Hoz, Riloba (ESP)
25 June 2018; 16:30	1× (yellow card) 4× (suspension)	Report	2× (yellow card) 7× (suspension)	Campclar Sports Palace, Tarragona; Referees: Hoz, Riloba (ESP)

25 June 2018; 18:30	Serbia	29–31	North Macedonia	Campclar Sports Palace, Tarragona; Referees: Macías, Ruiz (ESP)
25 June 2018; 18:30	Milić 6	(15–16)	Popovski 6	Campclar Sports Palace, Tarragona; Referees: Macías, Ruiz (ESP)
25 June 2018; 18:30	2× (yellow card) 4× (suspension)	Report	2× (yellow card) 3× (suspension) 1× (red card)	Campclar Sports Palace, Tarragona; Referees: Macías, Ruiz (ESP)

== Playoffs ==
=== Bracket ===
Quarterfinals
27 June
Tunisia	30
Algeria	25
27 June
Turkey	31
Portugal	29
27 June
Croatia	17
Slovenia	16
27 June
Spain	35
Serbia	25

Semifinals
29 June
Tunisia	28
Turkey	21
29 June
Croatia (OT)	31
Spain	29

Final
1 July
Tunisia	23
Croatia	24
Third place
1 July
Spain	30
Turkey	19

5–8th place semifinals
28 June
Algeria	32
Portugal	33
28 June
Slovenia	33
Serbia	26

Fifth place
30 June
Portugal	25
Slovenia	31
Seventh place
30 June
Algeria	30
Serbia	28

=== Quarterfinals ===
27 June 2018; 10:00	Tunisia	30–25	Algeria	Campclar Sports Palace, Tarragona; Referees: Soria, Monjo (ESP)
27 June 2018; 10:00	Chouiref 7	(14–12)	Hamoud 7	Campclar Sports Palace, Tarragona; Referees: Soria, Monjo (ESP)
27 June 2018; 10:00	2× (yellow card) 3× (suspension)	Report	3× (yellow card) 6× (suspension)	Campclar Sports Palace, Tarragona; Referees: Soria, Monjo (ESP)

27 June 2018; 12:30	Croatia	17–16	Slovenia	Campclar Sports Palace, Tarragona; Referees: Ivanović, Vujisić (MNE)
27 June 2018; 12:30	Božić Pavletić, Šipić 3	(9–7)	Marguč 5	Campclar Sports Palace, Tarragona; Referees: Ivanović, Vujisić (MNE)
27 June 2018; 12:30	2× (yellow card) 4× (suspension)	Report	2× (yellow card) 3× (suspension)	Campclar Sports Palace, Tarragona; Referees: Ivanović, Vujisić (MNE)

27 June 2018; 17:30	Spain	35–25	Serbia	Campclar Sports Palace, Tarragona; Referees: Deche, Ghouarda (ALG)
27 June 2018; 17:30	Odriozola 6	(20–11)	Milić 5	Campclar Sports Palace, Tarragona; Referees: Deche, Ghouarda (ALG)
27 June 2018; 17:30	3× (yellow card) 4× (suspension)	Report	3× (yellow card) 4× (suspension)	Campclar Sports Palace, Tarragona; Referees: Deche, Ghouarda (ALG)

27 June 2018; 20:00	Turkey	31–29	Portugal	Campclar Sports Palace, Tarragona; Referees: Macías, Ruiz (ESP)
27 June 2018; 20:00	Pehlivan 11	(17–12)	Fernandes 7	Campclar Sports Palace, Tarragona; Referees: Macías, Ruiz (ESP)
27 June 2018; 20:00	2× (yellow card) 5× (suspension) 1× (red card)	Report	3× (yellow card) 3× (suspension)	Campclar Sports Palace, Tarragona; Referees: Macías, Ruiz (ESP)

=== 5–8th place semifinals ===
28 June 2018; 17:30	Algeria	32–33	Portugal	Campclar Sports Palace, Tarragona; Referees: Chaskis, Tsakonas (GRE)
28 June 2018; 17:30	Berriah, Hamoud 5	(15–18)	Gomes 12	Campclar Sports Palace, Tarragona; Referees: Chaskis, Tsakonas (GRE)
28 June 2018; 17:30	3× (yellow card) 4× (suspension)	Report	3× (yellow card) 3× (suspension)	Campclar Sports Palace, Tarragona; Referees: Chaskis, Tsakonas (GRE)

28 June 2018; 20:00	Slovenia	33–26	Serbia	Campclar Sports Palace, Tarragona; Referees: Pinto, Santos (POR)
28 June 2018; 20:00	Grzentič 6	(15–14)	Živković 7	Campclar Sports Palace, Tarragona; Referees: Pinto, Santos (POR)
28 June 2018; 20:00	2× (yellow card) 3× (suspension) 1× (red card)	Report	1× (yellow card) 4× (suspension)	Campclar Sports Palace, Tarragona; Referees: Pinto, Santos (POR)

=== Semifinals ===
29 June 2018; 10:00	Tunisia	28–21	Turkey	Campclar Sports Palace, Tarragona; Referees: Ivanović, Vujisić (MNE)
29 June 2018; 10:00	Bacha 8	(15–8)	Pehlivan 9	Campclar Sports Palace, Tarragona; Referees: Ivanović, Vujisić (MNE)
29 June 2018; 10:00	2× (yellow card) 3× (suspension)	Report	2× (yellow card) 4× (suspension)	Campclar Sports Palace, Tarragona; Referees: Ivanović, Vujisić (MNE)

29 June 2018
12:30
Spain
29–31 (ET)
Croatia
Campclar Sports Palace, Tarragona
Referees: Jovandić, Sekulić (SRB)
Ariño 7
(12–15)
Jaganjac 9
3× (yellow card) 2× (suspension)
Report
2× (yellow card) 4× (suspension)

FT: 27–27 ET: 2–2, 0–2

=== Seventh place game ===
30 June 2018; 10:00	Algeria	30–28	Serbia	Campclar Sports Palace, Tarragona; Referees: Hoz, Riloba (ESP)
30 June 2018; 10:00	Abdi 10	(16–14)	Matičić 7	Campclar Sports Palace, Tarragona; Referees: Hoz, Riloba (ESP)
30 June 2018; 10:00	2× (yellow card) 5× (suspension) 1× (red card)	Report	2× (yellow card) 5× (suspension)	Campclar Sports Palace, Tarragona; Referees: Hoz, Riloba (ESP)

=== Fifth place game ===
30 June 2018; 12:30	Portugal	25–31	Slovenia	Campclar Sports Palace, Tarragona; Referees: El-Moamly, Abdelaziz (EGY)
30 June 2018; 12:30	Gomes 8	(12–13)	Žabič 5	Campclar Sports Palace, Tarragona; Referees: El-Moamly, Abdelaziz (EGY)
30 June 2018; 12:30	3× (yellow card) 3× (suspension)	Report	3× (yellow card) 6× (suspension)	Campclar Sports Palace, Tarragona; Referees: El-Moamly, Abdelaziz (EGY)

=== Bronze medal game ===
1 July 2018; 10:30	Spain	30–19	Turkey	Campclar Sports Palace, Tarragona; Referees: Jurinović, Mrvica (CRO)
1 July 2018; 10:30	Fernández 5	(15–8)	Pehlivan 10	Campclar Sports Palace, Tarragona; Referees: Jurinović, Mrvica (CRO)
1 July 2018; 10:30	3× (yellow card)	Report	3× (yellow card) 1× (suspension)	Campclar Sports Palace, Tarragona; Referees: Jurinović, Mrvica (CRO)

=== Final ===
1 July 2018; 13:00	Tunisia	23–24	Croatia	Campclar Sports Palace, Tarragona; Referees: Soria, Monjo (ESP)
1 July 2018; 13:00	Sanaï 5	(12–9)	Mandić 6	Campclar Sports Palace, Tarragona; Referees: Soria, Monjo (ESP)
1 July 2018; 13:00	2× (yellow card) 4× (suspension)	Report	1× (yellow card) 3× (suspension) 1× (red card)	Campclar Sports Palace, Tarragona; Referees: Soria, Monjo (ESP)

== Final standings ==
Rank	Team
1st place, gold medalist(s)	Croatia
2nd place, silver medalist(s)	Tunisia
3rd place, bronze medalist(s)	Spain
4	Turkey
5	Slovenia
6	Portugal
7	Algeria
8	Serbia
	Egypt
North Macedonia
Greece
Italy
Montenegro
