= 2018 IHF Super Globe =

Tournament details
- Host country: Qatar
- Venue: 1 (in 1 host city)
- Dates: 16–19 October
- Teams: 8 (from 5 confederations)

Final positions
- Champions: (Spain) Barcelona (4th title)
- Runners-up: (Germany) Füchse Berlin
- Third place: (France) Montpellier
- Fourth place: (Qatar) Al Sadd

Tournament statistics
- Matches played: 12
- Goals scored: 668 (55.67 per match)
- Top scorers: Khaled Haj Youssef (22 goals)

The 2018 IHF Super Globe was the twelfth edition of the tournament. It was held in Doha, Qatar at the Duhail Handball Sports Hall from 16 to 19 October 2018.

In a repeat of the previous year's final, Barcelona won their fourth title after a 29–24 win over Berlin.

== Venue ==
The championship was played in Doha, at the Duhail Handball Sports Hall.

Doha	2018 IHF Super Globe is located in Qatar
Duhail Handball Sports Hall; Capacidad: 5,500	2018 IHF Super Globe is located in Qatar

== Teams ==
The best club of each continent through their tournaments, the defending champion, a host team and a wild card team participated. Hammamat participated because the winner of the 2017 African Champions League (Zamalek) refused to participate for political reasons. The runner up (Espérance Tunis) was denied for not participating in the previous 2 African Champions League. The 3rd place (Al Ahly), who was from Egypt, refused to participate for political reasons.

Team	Qualified as
(Spain) Barcelona	Defending champion
(Tunisia) Hammamet	4th place African Handball Cup Champions League
(Bahrain) Al-Najma	Winner of Asian Club League Championship
(Australia) Sydney University	Winner of Oceania Champions Cup
(Brazil) Handebol Taubaté	Winner of Pan American Club Championship
(France) Montpellier	Winner of EHF Champions League
(Qatar) Al Sadd	Host
(Germany) Füchse Berlin	Wild card

== Results ==
All times are local (UTC+3).

=== Bracket ===
Quarterfinals
16 October
(Spain) Barcelona	37
(Bahrain) Al-Najma	28
16 October
(France) Montpellier	31
(Tunisia) Hammamet	22
16 October
(Brazil) Handebol Taubaté	25
(Germany) Füchse Berlin	33
16 October
(Qatar) Al Sadd	27
(Australia) Sydney University	22

Semifinals
17 October
(Spain) Barcelona	37
(France) Montpellier	30
17 October
(Germany) Füchse Berlin	26
(Qatar) Al Sadd	20

Final
19 October
(Spain) Barcelona	29
(Germany) Füchse Berlin	24
Third place
19 October
(France) Montpellier	33
(Qatar) Al Sadd	23

5th place bracket

5–8th place semifinals
17 October
(Bahrain) Al-Najma	26
(Tunisia) Hammamet	27
17 October
(Brazil) Handebol Taubaté	38
(Australia) Sydney University	18

Fifth place
19 October
(Tunisia) Hammamet	24
(Brazil) Handebol Taubaté	34
Seventh place
19 October
(Bahrain) Al-Najma	28
(Australia) Sydney University	26

=== Quarterfinals ===
16 October 2018; 13:00	Barcelona (Spain)	37–28	(Bahrain) Al-Najma	Duhail Handball Sports Hall, Doha; Referees: Schulze, Tönnies (GER)
16 October 2018; 13:00	Mortensen 5	(19–14)	Al-Sayyad 7	Duhail Handball Sports Hall, Doha; Referees: Schulze, Tönnies (GER)
16 October 2018; 13:00	2× (yellow card) 2× (suspension)	Report	3× (yellow card) 4× (suspension)	Duhail Handball Sports Hall, Doha; Referees: Schulze, Tönnies (GER)

16 October 2018; 15:00	Montpellier (France)	31–22	(Tunisia) Hammamet	Duhail Handball Sports Hall, Doha; Referees: Raluy, Sabroso (ESP)
16 October 2018; 15:00	three players 6	(16–10)	Lopes, Jaziri 4	Duhail Handball Sports Hall, Doha; Referees: Raluy, Sabroso (ESP)
16 October 2018; 15:00	2× (yellow card) 3× (suspension)	Report	3× (yellow card) 2× (suspension)	Duhail Handball Sports Hall, Doha; Referees: Raluy, Sabroso (ESP)

16 October 2018; 17:00	Handebol Taubaté (Brazil)	25–33	(Germany) Füchse Berlin	Duhail Handball Sports Hall, Doha; Referees: Gjeding, Hansen (DEN)
16 October 2018; 17:00	Gama, Perrela 4	(11–19)	Marsenić, Reißky 5	Duhail Handball Sports Hall, Doha; Referees: Gjeding, Hansen (DEN)
16 October 2018; 17:00	4× (suspension)	Report	1× (yellow card) 4× (suspension)	Duhail Handball Sports Hall, Doha; Referees: Gjeding, Hansen (DEN)

16 October 2018; 19:00	Al Sadd (Qatar)	27–22	(Australia) Sydney University	Duhail Handball Sports Hall, Doha; Attendance: 300; Referees: Grillo, Lenci (ARG)
16 October 2018; 19:00	Haj Youssef, Nowraddine 7	(13–13)	Mehdizadeh 6	Duhail Handball Sports Hall, Doha; Attendance: 300; Referees: Grillo, Lenci (ARG)
16 October 2018; 19:00	2× (yellow card) 3× (suspension)	Report	2× (yellow card) 5× (suspension)	Duhail Handball Sports Hall, Doha; Attendance: 300; Referees: Grillo, Lenci (ARG)

=== 5–8th place semifinals ===
17 October 2018; 13:00	Hammamet (Tunisia)	27–26	(Bahrain) Al-Najma	Duhail Handball Sports Hall, Doha; Attendance: 300; Referees: Lenci, Grillo (ARG)
17 October 2018; 13:00	Jaziri 9	(14–14)	Mirza 7	Duhail Handball Sports Hall, Doha; Attendance: 300; Referees: Lenci, Grillo (ARG)
17 October 2018; 13:00	3× (yellow card) 3× (suspension)	Report	2× (yellow card) 1× (suspension) 1× (red card)	Duhail Handball Sports Hall, Doha; Attendance: 300; Referees: Lenci, Grillo (ARG)

17 October 2018; 15:00	Sydney University (Australia)	18–38	(Brazil) Handebol Taubaté	Duhail Handball Sports Hall, Doha; Attendance: 300; Referees: Schulze, Tönnies (GER)
17 October 2018; 15:00	three players 3	(12–16)	three players 5	Duhail Handball Sports Hall, Doha; Attendance: 300; Referees: Schulze, Tönnies (GER)
17 October 2018; 15:00	3× (yellow card) 7× (suspension)	Report	2× (yellow card) 5× (suspension)	Duhail Handball Sports Hall, Doha; Attendance: 300; Referees: Schulze, Tönnies (GER)

=== Semifinals ===
17 October 2018; 17:00	Montpellier (France)	30–37	(Spain) Barcelona	Duhail Handball Sports Hall, Doha; Attendance: 350; Referees: Gjeding, Hansen (DEN)
17 October 2018; 17:00	Richardson 10	(19–18)	Mortensen 7	Duhail Handball Sports Hall, Doha; Attendance: 350; Referees: Gjeding, Hansen (DEN)
17 October 2018; 17:00	1× (yellow card) 4× (suspension)	Report	1× (yellow card) 6× (suspension)	Duhail Handball Sports Hall, Doha; Attendance: 350; Referees: Gjeding, Hansen (DEN)

17 October 2018; 19:00	Al Sadd (Qatar)	20–26	(Germany) Füchse Berlin	Duhail Handball Sports Hall, Doha; Attendance: 300; Referees: Khenissi, Boualloucha (TUN)
17 October 2018; 19:00	Haj Youssef 8	(9–11)	Holm, Lindberg 6	Duhail Handball Sports Hall, Doha; Attendance: 300; Referees: Khenissi, Boualloucha (TUN)
17 October 2018; 19:00	3× (yellow card) 3× (suspension)	Report	3× (yellow card) 3× (suspension)	Duhail Handball Sports Hall, Doha; Attendance: 300; Referees: Khenissi, Boualloucha (TUN)

=== Seventh place game ===
19 October 2018; 13:00	Sydney University (Australia)	26–28	(Bahrain) Al-Najma	Duhail Handball Sports Hall, Doha; Referees: Khenissi, Boualloucha (TUN)
19 October 2018; 13:00	Mehdizadeh, Perronneau 5	(12–17)	Mahfoodh 9	Duhail Handball Sports Hall, Doha; Referees: Khenissi, Boualloucha (TUN)
19 October 2018; 13:00	2× (yellow card) 5× (suspension)	Report	1× (yellow card) 6× (suspension)	Duhail Handball Sports Hall, Doha; Referees: Khenissi, Boualloucha (TUN)

=== Fifth place game ===
19 October 2018; 15:00	Handebol Taubaté (Brazil)	34–24	(Tunisia) Hammamet	Duhail Handball Sports Hall, Doha; Attendance: 300; Referees: Schulze, Tönnies (GER)
19 October 2018; 15:00	Soares 8	(14–13)	Jaziri 7	Duhail Handball Sports Hall, Doha; Attendance: 300; Referees: Schulze, Tönnies (GER)
19 October 2018; 15:00	1× (yellow card) 5× (suspension)	Report	2× (yellow card) 5× (suspension)	Duhail Handball Sports Hall, Doha; Attendance: 300; Referees: Schulze, Tönnies (GER)

=== Third place game ===
19 October 2018; 17:00	Al Sadd (Qatar)	23–33	(France) Montpellier	Duhail Handball Sports Hall, Doha; Attendance: 400; Referees: Raluy, Sabroso (ESP)
19 October 2018; 17:00	Nowraddine 8	(9–14)	Porte 11	Duhail Handball Sports Hall, Doha; Attendance: 400; Referees: Raluy, Sabroso (ESP)
19 October 2018; 17:00	2× (yellow card) 4× (suspension)	Report	2× (yellow card) 1× (suspension)	Duhail Handball Sports Hall, Doha; Attendance: 400; Referees: Raluy, Sabroso (ESP)

=== Final ===
19 October 2018; 19:00	Füchse Berlin (Germany)	24–29	(Spain) Barcelona	Duhail Handball Sports Hall, Doha; Attendance: 850; Referees: Gjeding, Hansen (DEN)
19 October 2018; 19:00	Holm 8	(12–13)	Tomás 5	Duhail Handball Sports Hall, Doha; Attendance: 850; Referees: Gjeding, Hansen (DEN)
19 October 2018; 19:00	1× (yellow card) 2× (suspension)	Report	1× (yellow card) 1× (suspension)	Duhail Handball Sports Hall, Doha; Attendance: 850; Referees: Gjeding, Hansen (DEN)

== Final ranking ==
Rank	Team
1st place, gold medalist(s)	(Spain) Barcelona
2nd place, silver medalist(s)	(Germany) Füchse Berlin
3rd place, bronze medalist(s)	(France) Montpellier
4	(Qatar) Al Sadd
5	(Brazil) Handebol Taubaté
6	(Tunisia) Hammamet
7	(Bahrain) Al-Najma
8	(Australia) Sydney University

== Top scorers ==
Rank	Player	Club	G	S	E%	7m	MP
1	Khaled Haj Youssef	(Qatar) Al Sadd	22	28	79	4	3
2	Oussama Jaziri	(Tunisia) Hammamet	20	40	50	0	3
3	Amir Nowraddine Denguir	(Qatar) Al Sadd	20	44	45	0	3
4	Casper Mortensen	(Spain) Barcelona	16	18	89	6	3
5	Jacob Holm	(Germany) Füchse Berlin	15	27	56	0	3
6	Melvyn Richardson	(France) Montpellier	15	20	75	4	3
7	Ali Mirza Salman	(Bahrain) Al-Najma	15	26	58	1	3
8	Hussain Al Sayyad	(Bahrain) Al-Najma	14	26	54	0	3
9	Sérgio Lopes	(Tunisia) Hammamet	13	19	68	0	3
10	Valentin Porte	(France) Montpellier	13	14	93	0	3

Source: IHF
