= Handball at the 2024 Summer Olympics – Asian men's qualification tournament =

Asian Men's Qualification for Olympic Games 2024

Tournament details
- Host country: Qatar
- Venue: 1 (in 1 host city)
- Dates: 18–28 October 2023
- Teams: 11 (from 1 confederation)

Final positions
- Champions: Japan
- Runners-up: Bahrain
- Third place: South Korea
- Fourth place: Qatar

Tournament statistics
- Matches played: 32
- Goals scored: 1,882 (58.81 per match)

The Asian Men's Qualification for Olympic Games 2024 was held in Doha, Qatar. Japan, as the winner of the tournament qualified to the 2024 Summer Olympics, while the second placed team, Bahrain, would play at the 2024 IHF Men's Olympic Qualification Tournaments in March 2024 to win one of the six slots to compete at the Olympics.

== Preliminary round ==
Uzbekistan withdrew before the tournament (Group B).

All times are local (UTC+3).

=== Group A ===
Pos	Team	Pld	W	D	L	GF	GA	GD	Pts	Qualification
1	Qatar (H)	5	5	0	0	185	111	+74	10	Semifinals
2	South Korea	5	4	0	1	157	131	+26	8	Semifinals
3	Saudi Arabia	5	3	0	2	152	123	+29	6	
4	United Arab Emirates	5	2	0	3	138	134	+4	4	
5	China	5	1	0	4	147	141	+6	2	
6	India	5	0	0	5	87	226	−139	0	

Rules for classification: 1) points; 2) head-to-head points; 3) head-to-head goal difference; 4) head-to-head number of goals scored; 5) goal difference.
(H) Hosts

18 October 2023; 11:00	South Korea	29–23	United Arab Emirates	Duhail Handball Sports Hall, Doha; Referees: Ismoilov, Ismoilov (UZB)
18 October 2023; 11:00	Jang 5	(15–6)	Rashed 6	Duhail Handball Sports Hall, Doha; Referees: Ismoilov, Ismoilov (UZB)
18 October 2023; 11:00	1× (yellow card) 1× (suspension)	Report	1× (yellow card) 4× (suspension)	Duhail Handball Sports Hall, Doha; Referees: Ismoilov, Ismoilov (UZB)

18 October 2023; 15:00	Saudi Arabia	46–17	India	Duhail Handball Sports Hall, Doha; Referees: Al-Nasesem, Al-Enezi (KUW)
18 October 2023; 15:00	Al-Abdulali 7	(25–7)	Harender 6	Duhail Handball Sports Hall, Doha; Referees: Al-Nasesem, Al-Enezi (KUW)
18 October 2023; 15:00	2× (suspension)	Report		Duhail Handball Sports Hall, Doha; Referees: Al-Nasesem, Al-Enezi (KUW)

18 October 2023; 19:00	Qatar	34–25	China	Duhail Handball Sports Hall, Doha; Referees: Gheisarian, Gheisarian (IRI)
18 October 2023; 19:00	Madadi 8	(17–13)	Zhu 8	Duhail Handball Sports Hall, Doha; Referees: Gheisarian, Gheisarian (IRI)
18 October 2023; 19:00	4× (suspension)	Report	7× (suspension)	Duhail Handball Sports Hall, Doha; Referees: Gheisarian, Gheisarian (IRI)

19 October 2023; 11:00	Saudi Arabia	27–29	South Korea	Duhail Handball Sports Hall, Doha; Referees: Gheisarian, Gheisarian (IRI)
19 October 2023; 11:00	Al-Abdulali 10	(14–16)	Jang 7	Duhail Handball Sports Hall, Doha; Referees: Gheisarian, Gheisarian (IRI)
19 October 2023; 11:00	1× (yellow card) 6× (suspension) 1× (red card)	Report	1× (yellow card) 8× (suspension) 2× (red card)	Duhail Handball Sports Hall, Doha; Referees: Gheisarian, Gheisarian (IRI)

19 October 2023; 13:00	United Arab Emirates	31–30	China	Duhail Handball Sports Hall, Doha; Referees: Al-Zayyat, Awwad (JOR)
19 October 2023; 13:00	Jehad 11	(14–17)	Liu 8	Duhail Handball Sports Hall, Doha; Referees: Al-Zayyat, Awwad (JOR)
19 October 2023; 13:00	1× (yellow card) 3× (suspension) 1× (red card)	Report	1× (yellow card) 6× (suspension)	Duhail Handball Sports Hall, Doha; Referees: Al-Zayyat, Awwad (JOR)

19 October 2023; 19:00	India	14–48	Qatar	Duhail Handball Sports Hall, Doha; Referees: Al-Wahibi, Al-Shahi (OMA)
19 October 2023; 19:00	Vikas 4	(6–26)	Ayed 11	Duhail Handball Sports Hall, Doha; Referees: Al-Wahibi, Al-Shahi (OMA)
19 October 2023; 19:00	4× (suspension)	Report	1× (suspension)	Duhail Handball Sports Hall, Doha; Referees: Al-Wahibi, Al-Shahi (OMA)

21 October 2023; 13:00	South Korea	46–19	India	Duhail Handball Sports Hall, Doha; Referees: Al-Zayyat, Awwad (JOR)
21 October 2023; 13:00	Song 9	(28–9)	Harender 13	Duhail Handball Sports Hall, Doha; Referees: Al-Zayyat, Awwad (JOR)
21 October 2023; 13:00	1× (suspension)	Report	1× (suspension)	Duhail Handball Sports Hall, Doha; Referees: Al-Zayyat, Awwad (JOR)

21 October 2023; 17:00	China	23–33	Saudi Arabia	Duhail Handball Sports Hall, Doha; Referees: Ismoilov, Ismoilov (UZB)
21 October 2023; 17:00	He 4	(11–15)	Al-Hassan 8	Duhail Handball Sports Hall, Doha; Referees: Ismoilov, Ismoilov (UZB)
21 October 2023; 17:00	1× (yellow card) 1× (suspension)	Report	2× (yellow card) 4× (suspension)	Duhail Handball Sports Hall, Doha; Referees: Ismoilov, Ismoilov (UZB)

21 October 2023; 19:00	Qatar	31–23	United Arab Emirates	Duhail Handball Sports Hall, Doha; Referees: Al-Naseem, Al-Enezi (KUW)
21 October 2023; 19:00	Abdalla, Carol 4	(14–10)	Moham 8	Duhail Handball Sports Hall, Doha; Referees: Al-Naseem, Al-Enezi (KUW)
21 October 2023; 19:00	1× (yellow card) 4× (suspension)	Report	1× (yellow card) 5× (suspension)	Duhail Handball Sports Hall, Doha; Referees: Al-Naseem, Al-Enezi (KUW)

22 October 2023; 11:00	India	15–46	China	Duhail Handball Sports Hall, Doha; Referees: Gheisarian, Gheisarian (IRI)
22 October 2023; 11:00	Harender 5	(7–25)	Zhang T. 8	Duhail Handball Sports Hall, Doha; Referees: Gheisarian, Gheisarian (IRI)
22 October 2023; 11:00	1× (suspension)	Report	2× (suspension)	Duhail Handball Sports Hall, Doha; Referees: Gheisarian, Gheisarian (IRI)

22 October 2023; 15:00	United Arab Emirates	21–22	Saudi Arabia	Duhail Handball Sports Hall, Doha; Referees: Al-Wahibi, Al-Shahi (OMA)
22 October 2023; 15:00	Moham 6	(11–8)	Al-Abbas, Al-Hassan 4	Duhail Handball Sports Hall, Doha; Referees: Al-Wahibi, Al-Shahi (OMA)
22 October 2023; 15:00	3× (suspension) 1× (red card)	Report	2× (suspension)	Duhail Handball Sports Hall, Doha; Referees: Al-Wahibi, Al-Shahi (OMA)

22 October 2023; 19:00	South Korea	25–39	Qatar	Duhail Handball Sports Hall, Doha; Referees: Schulze, Tönnies (GER)
22 October 2023; 19:00	Park K. 5	(11–16)	Madadi 9	Duhail Handball Sports Hall, Doha; Referees: Schulze, Tönnies (GER)
22 October 2023; 19:00	1× (yellow card) 4× (suspension)	Report	7× (suspension)	Duhail Handball Sports Hall, Doha; Referees: Schulze, Tönnies (GER)

24 October 2023; 13:00	United Arab Emirates	40–22	India	Duhail Handball Sports Hall, Doha; Referees: Gheisarian, Gheisarian (IRI)
24 October 2023; 13:00	Mubarak 7	(20–10)	Sharma, Harender 4	Duhail Handball Sports Hall, Doha; Referees: Gheisarian, Gheisarian (IRI)
24 October 2023; 13:00	2× (suspension)	Report	3× (suspension)	Duhail Handball Sports Hall, Doha; Referees: Gheisarian, Gheisarian (IRI)

24 October 2023; 15:00	China	23–28	South Korea	Duhail Handball Sports Hall, Doha; Referees: Al-Naseem, Al-Enezi (KUW)
24 October 2023; 15:00	Zhu 7	(10–16)	Kim Y., Park K. 5	Duhail Handball Sports Hall, Doha; Referees: Al-Naseem, Al-Enezi (KUW)
24 October 2023; 15:00	1× (yellow card) 1× (suspension)	Report	3× (suspension)	Duhail Handball Sports Hall, Doha; Referees: Al-Naseem, Al-Enezi (KUW)

24 October 2023; 19:00	Qatar	33–24	Saudi Arabia	Duhail Handball Sports Hall, Doha; Referees: Ismoilov, Ismoilov (UZB)
24 October 2023; 19:00	Carol, Sassi 5	(14–9)	Al-Salam 6	Duhail Handball Sports Hall, Doha; Referees: Ismoilov, Ismoilov (UZB)
24 October 2023; 19:00	2× (yellow card) 3× (suspension)	Report	1× (yellow card) 2× (suspension)	Duhail Handball Sports Hall, Doha; Referees: Ismoilov, Ismoilov (UZB)

=== Group B ===
Pos	Team	Pld	W	D	L	GF	GA	GD	Pts	Qualification
1	Japan	4	4	0	0	128	95	+33	8	Semifinals
2	Bahrain	4	3	0	1	134	95	+39	6	Semifinals
3	Iran	4	2	0	2	115	101	+14	4	
4	Kuwait	4	1	0	3	123	126	−3	2	
5	Kazakhstan	4	0	0	4	88	171	−83	0	

Rules for classification: 1) points; 2) head-to-head points; 3) head-to-head goal difference; 4) head-to-head number of goals scored; 5) goal difference.

18 October 2023; 13:00	Kazakhstan	18–46	Bahrain	Duhail Handball Sports Hall, Doha; Referees: Al-Wahibi, Al-Shahi (OMA)
18 October 2023; 13:00	Tilekkabyl 4	(6–23)	Rabia 7	Duhail Handball Sports Hall, Doha; Referees: Al-Wahibi, Al-Shahi (OMA)
18 October 2023; 13:00	6× (suspension)	Report	1× (suspension)	Duhail Handball Sports Hall, Doha; Referees: Al-Wahibi, Al-Shahi (OMA)

18 October 2023; 17:00	Japan	25–20	Iran	Duhail Handball Sports Hall, Doha; Referees: Cheng, Zhou (CHN)
18 October 2023; 17:00	Yasuhira 6	(14–8)	Oraei 7	Duhail Handball Sports Hall, Doha; Referees: Cheng, Zhou (CHN)
18 October 2023; 17:00	4× (suspension)	Report	4× (suspension)	Duhail Handball Sports Hall, Doha; Referees: Cheng, Zhou (CHN)

19 October 2023; 15:00	Kuwait	28–29	Iran	Duhail Handball Sports Hall, Doha; Referees: Koo, Lee (KOR)
19 October 2023; 15:00	Al-Shammari 6	(12–17)	Sadeghi 8	Duhail Handball Sports Hall, Doha; Referees: Koo, Lee (KOR)
19 October 2023; 15:00	1× (yellow card)	Report	3× (suspension)	Duhail Handball Sports Hall, Doha; Referees: Koo, Lee (KOR)

19 October 2023; 17:00	Japan	27–26	Bahrain	Duhail Handball Sports Hall, Doha; Referees: Schulze, Tönnies (GER)
19 October 2023; 17:00	Motoki 5	(14–16)	Naser 7	Duhail Handball Sports Hall, Doha; Referees: Schulze, Tönnies (GER)
19 October 2023; 17:00	1× (yellow card) 4× (suspension) 1× (red card)	Report	3× (suspension) 1× (red card)	Duhail Handball Sports Hall, Doha; Referees: Schulze, Tönnies (GER)

21 October 2023; 11:00	Iran	42–20	Kazakhstan	Duhail Handball Sports Hall, Doha; Referees: Cheng, Zhou (CHN)
21 October 2023; 11:00	Soltani 8	(20–4)	Kenzhebayev, Tilekkabyl 4	Duhail Handball Sports Hall, Doha; Referees: Cheng, Zhou (CHN)
21 October 2023; 11:00	3× (suspension)	Report	1× (suspension)	Duhail Handball Sports Hall, Doha; Referees: Cheng, Zhou (CHN)

21 October 2023; 15:00	Kuwait	30–32	Japan	Duhail Handball Sports Hall, Doha; Referees: Schulze, Tönnies (GER)
21 October 2023; 15:00	Al-Shammari 6	(30–32)	five players 5	Duhail Handball Sports Hall, Doha; Referees: Schulze, Tönnies (GER)
21 October 2023; 15:00	7× (suspension) 1× (red card)	Report	1× (yellow card) 3× (suspension)	Duhail Handball Sports Hall, Doha; Referees: Schulze, Tönnies (GER)

22 October 2023; 13:00	Kazakhstan	19–44	Japan	Duhail Handball Sports Hall, Doha; Referees: Koo, Lee (KOR)
22 October 2023; 13:00	Melnichenko, Tilekkabyl 5	(11–25)	Daiki 11	Duhail Handball Sports Hall, Doha; Referees: Koo, Lee (KOR)
22 October 2023; 13:00	2× (suspension)	Report	1× (suspension)	Duhail Handball Sports Hall, Doha; Referees: Koo, Lee (KOR)

22 October 2023; 17:00	Kuwait	26–34	Bahrain	Duhail Handball Sports Hall, Doha; Referees: Cheng, Zhou (CHN)
22 October 2023; 17:00	three players 5	(14–16)	Al-Sayyad 9	Duhail Handball Sports Hall, Doha; Referees: Cheng, Zhou (CHN)
22 October 2023; 17:00	1× (yellow card) 4× (suspension)	Report	2× (suspension)	Duhail Handball Sports Hall, Doha; Referees: Cheng, Zhou (CHN)

24 October 2023; 11:00	Kazakhstan	31–39	Kuwait	Duhail Handball Sports Hall, Doha; Referees: Al-Zayyat, Awwad (JOR)
24 October 2023; 11:00	three players 6	(13–19)	Al-Haddad, Al-Harbi 6	Duhail Handball Sports Hall, Doha; Referees: Al-Zayyat, Awwad (JOR)
24 October 2023; 11:00	1× (yellow card) 1× (suspension)	Report	1× (suspension)	Duhail Handball Sports Hall, Doha; Referees: Al-Zayyat, Awwad (JOR)

24 October 2023; 17:00	Bahrain	28–24	Iran	Duhail Handball Sports Hall, Doha; Referees: Koo, Lee (KOR)
24 October 2023; 17:00	Al-Sayyad 9	(16–12)	Oraei 8	Duhail Handball Sports Hall, Doha; Referees: Koo, Lee (KOR)
24 October 2023; 17:00	1× (suspension) 1× (red card)	Report	1× (yellow card) 3× (suspension)	Duhail Handball Sports Hall, Doha; Referees: Koo, Lee (KOR)

== Classification games ==
=== Ninth place game ===
26 October 2023; 11:00	China	44–22	Kazakhstan	Duhail Handball Sports Hall, Doha; Referees: Al-Naseem, Al-Enezi (KUW)
26 October 2023; 11:00	Zhu 10	(21–11)	Oxikbayev 7	Duhail Handball Sports Hall, Doha; Referees: Al-Naseem, Al-Enezi (KUW)
26 October 2023; 11:00	1× (suspension)	Report	2× (suspension) 1× (red card)	Duhail Handball Sports Hall, Doha; Referees: Al-Naseem, Al-Enezi (KUW)

=== Seventh place game ===
26 October 2023; 13:00	United Arab Emirates	26–31	Kuwait	Duhail Handball Sports Hall, Doha; Referees: Ismoilov, Ismoilov (UZB)
26 October 2023; 13:00	Saeed Rashed 8	(16–20)	Al-Shammari 8	Duhail Handball Sports Hall, Doha; Referees: Ismoilov, Ismoilov (UZB)
26 October 2023; 13:00	1× (yellow card) 3× (suspension)	Report	5× (suspension)	Duhail Handball Sports Hall, Doha; Referees: Ismoilov, Ismoilov (UZB)

=== Fifth place game ===
26 October 2023; 15:00	Saudi Arabia	28–30	Iran	Duhail Handball Sports Hall, Doha; Referees: Al-Zayyat, Eial Awwad (JOR)
26 October 2023; 15:00	Al-Abbas 6	(13–17)	Oraei 8	Duhail Handball Sports Hall, Doha; Referees: Al-Zayyat, Eial Awwad (JOR)
26 October 2023; 15:00	1× (yellow card) 3× (suspension) 1× (red card)	Report	3× (suspension)	Duhail Handball Sports Hall, Doha; Referees: Al-Zayyat, Eial Awwad (JOR)

== Knockout stage ==
=== Bracket ===
Semi-finals
26 October
Qatar	29
Bahrain	30
26 October
Japan	34
South Korea	23

Final
28 October
Bahrain	29
Japan	32
Third place
28 October
Qatar	32
South Korea	38

=== Semifinals ===
26 October 2023; 17:30	Qatar	29–30	Bahrain	Duhail Handball Sports Hall, Doha; Referees: Schulze, Tönnies (GER)
26 October 2023; 17:30	Benali 11	(14–15)	Fadhul 7	Duhail Handball Sports Hall, Doha; Referees: Schulze, Tönnies (GER)
26 October 2023; 17:30	2× (yellow card) 4× (suspension)	Report	2× (yellow card) 6× (suspension) 1× (red card)	Duhail Handball Sports Hall, Doha; Referees: Schulze, Tönnies (GER)

26 October 2023; 19:30	Japan	34–23	South Korea	Duhail Handball Sports Hall, Doha; Referees: Cheng, Zhou (CHN)
26 October 2023; 19:30	Baig 6	(15–9)	Lee H. 7	Duhail Handball Sports Hall, Doha; Referees: Cheng, Zhou (CHN)
26 October 2023; 19:30	4× (suspension)	Report	2× (suspension) 1× (red card)	Duhail Handball Sports Hall, Doha; Referees: Cheng, Zhou (CHN)

=== Third place game ===
28 October 2023; 15:00	Qatar	32–38	South Korea	Duhail Handball Sports Hall, Doha; Referees: Al-Wahibi, Al-Shahi (OMA)
28 October 2023; 15:00	Benali, Denguir 7	(15–17)	Park K. 11	Duhail Handball Sports Hall, Doha; Referees: Al-Wahibi, Al-Shahi (OMA)
28 October 2023; 15:00	3× (suspension)	Report	3× (suspension)	Duhail Handball Sports Hall, Doha; Referees: Al-Wahibi, Al-Shahi (OMA)

=== Final ===
28 October 2023; 17:30	Bahrain	29–32	Japan	Duhail Handball Sports Hall, Doha; Referees: Schulze, Tönnies (GER)
28 October 2023; 17:30	Al-Sayyad 10	(13–18)	Yasuhira 10	Duhail Handball Sports Hall, Doha; Referees: Schulze, Tönnies (GER)
28 October 2023; 17:30	1× (yellow card) 6× (suspension)	Report	2× (yellow card) 7× (suspension)	Duhail Handball Sports Hall, Doha; Referees: Schulze, Tönnies (GER)

== Final standings ==
Rank	Team
1st place, gold medalist(s)	Japan
2nd place, silver medalist(s)	Bahrain
3rd place, bronze medalist(s)	South Korea
4	Qatar
5	Iran
6	Saudi Arabia
7	Kuwait
8	United Arab Emirates
9	China
10	Kazakhstan
11	India

Qualified for the 2024 Summer Olympics
Qualified for the 2024 Olympic Qualification Tournaments
