= 2015 Handball World Championships =

2015 Handball World Championships may refer to:

- 2015 World Men's Handball Championship, hosted in January in Qatar
- 2015 World Women's Handball Championship, hosted in December in Denmark
