= Handball at the 2020 Summer Olympics – Men's qualification =

The qualification for the 2020 Men's Olympic Handball Tournament assigned quota places to twelve teams: the hosts, the world champion, four winners of continental events and six teams from the World Olympic qualification tournaments respectively. (The Olympics were postponed to 2021 due to the COVID-19 pandemic).

== Qualification summary ==
Qualification	Date	Host(s)	Vacancies	Qualified
Host nation	—	—	1	Japan
2019 World Championship	10–27 January 2019	Denmark; Germany	1	Denmark
2019 Pan American Games	31 July – 5 August 2019	(Peru) Lima	1	Argentina
AHF Men’s Asian qualification event	17–26 October 2019	(Qatar) Doha	1	Bahrain
2020 European Championship	10–26 January 2020	Austria; Norway; Sweden	1	Spain
2020 African Championship	16–26 January 2020	Tunisia	1	Egypt
2020 IHF Men's Olympic Qualification Tournaments	12–14 March 2021	(Montenegro) Podgorica	2	Norway; Brazil
2020 IHF Men's Olympic Qualification Tournaments	12–14 March 2021	(France) Montpellier	2	France; Portugal
2020 IHF Men's Olympic Qualification Tournaments	12–14 March 2021	(Germany) Berlin	2	Sweden; Germany
Total			12	

== Legend for qualification type ==
Qualified
Key	From	To
	World Championship	Olympic Tournament
	Continental Qualification Event	Olympic Tournament
	World Championship	Qualification Tournament
	Continental Qualification Event	Qualification Tournament

== Host country ==
- Japan

== World Championship ==
Rank	Team
1st place, gold medalist(s)	Denmark
2nd place, silver medalist(s)	Norway
3rd place, bronze medalist(s)	France
4	Germany
5	Sweden
6	Croatia
7	Spain
8	Egypt
9	Brazil
10	Hungary
11	Iceland
12	Tunisia
13	Qatar
14	Russia
15	North Macedonia
16	Chile
17	Argentina
18	Serbia
19	Austria
20	Bahrain
21	Saudi Arabia
22	Korea
23	Angola
24	Japan

== Continental qualification ==
=== Europe ===
Rank	Team
1st place, gold medalist(s)	Spain
2nd place, silver medalist(s)	Croatia
3rd place, bronze medalist(s)	Norway
4	Slovenia
5	Germany
6	Portugal
7	Sweden
8	Austria
9	Hungary
10	Belarus
11	Iceland
12	Czech Republic
13	Denmark
14	France
15	North Macedonia
16	Switzerland
17	Netherlands
18	Montenegro
19	Ukraine
20	Serbia
21	Poland
22	Russia
23	Bosnia and Herzegovina
24	Latvia

=== Asia ===
==== Preliminary round ====
All times are local (UTC+3).

===== Group A =====
Pos	Team	Pld	W	D	L	GF	GA	GD	Pts	Qualification
1	Qatar (H)	3	3	0	0	118	44	+74	6	Semifinals
2	Saudi Arabia	3	2	0	1	96	69	+27	4	Semifinals
3	India	3	1	0	2	66	104	−38	2	
4	Hong Kong	3	0	0	3	59	122	−63	0	

Source: AHF
Rules for classification: 1) points; 2) head-to-head points; 3) head-to-head goal difference; 4) head-to-head number of goals scored; 5) goal difference.
(H) Hosts

17 October 2019; 16:00	Saudi Arabia	35–24	India	Duhail Handball Sports Hall, Doha
17 October 2019; 16:00		(19–13)		Duhail Handball Sports Hall, Doha

17 October 2019; 18:00	Qatar	49–14	Hong Kong	Duhail Handball Sports Hall, Doha
17 October 2019; 18:00		(19–6)		Duhail Handball Sports Hall, Doha

19 October 2019; 16:00	Hong Kong	16–41	Saudi Arabia	Duhail Handball Sports Hall, Doha
19 October 2019; 16:00		(6–17)		Duhail Handball Sports Hall, Doha

19 October 2019; 18:00	India	10–40	Qatar	Duhail Handball Sports Hall, Doha
19 October 2019; 18:00		(4–18)		Duhail Handball Sports Hall, Doha

21 October 2019; 16:00	India	32–29	Hong Kong	Duhail Handball Sports Hall, Doha
21 October 2019; 16:00		(16–15)		Duhail Handball Sports Hall, Doha

21 October 2019; 18:00	Qatar	29–20	Saudi Arabia	Duhail Handball Sports Hall, Doha
21 October 2019; 18:00		(13–9)		Duhail Handball Sports Hall, Doha

===== Group B =====
Pos	Team	Pld	W	D	L	GF	GA	GD	Pts	Qualification
1	South Korea	3	2	0	1	94	90	+4	4 (Note: Bahrain 30–31 South Korea)	Semifinals
2	Bahrain	3	2	0	1	85	78	+7	4	Semifinals
3	Iran	3	1	1	1	90	92	−2	3	
4	Kuwait	3	0	1	2	89	98	−9	1	

Source: AHF
Rules for classification: 1) points; 2) head-to-head points; 3) head-to-head goal difference; 4) head-to-head number of goals scored; 5) goal difference.
Notes:

18 October 2019; 16:00	South Korea	27–28	Iran	Duhail Handball Sports Hall, Doha
18 October 2019; 16:00		(12–13)		Duhail Handball Sports Hall, Doha

18 October 2019; 18:00	Bahrain	26–21	Kuwait	Duhail Handball Sports Hall, Doha
18 October 2019; 18:00		(12–10)		Duhail Handball Sports Hall, Doha

20 October 2019; 16:00	Kuwait	32–36	South Korea	Duhail Handball Sports Hall, Doha
20 October 2019; 16:00		(16–20)		Duhail Handball Sports Hall, Doha

20 October 2019; 18:00	Iran	26–29	Bahrain	Duhail Handball Sports Hall, Doha
20 October 2019; 18:00		(13–15)		Duhail Handball Sports Hall, Doha

22 October 2019; 16:00	Bahrain	30–31	South Korea	Duhail Handball Sports Hall, Doha
22 October 2019; 16:00		(16–14)		Duhail Handball Sports Hall, Doha

22 October 2019; 18:00	Iran	36–36	Kuwait	Duhail Handball Sports Hall, Doha
22 October 2019; 18:00		(18–16)		Duhail Handball Sports Hall, Doha

==== Knockout stage ====
===== Bracket =====
Semifinals
24 October
Qatar	26
Bahrain	28
24 October
South Korea	29
Saudi Arabia	26

Final
26 October
Bahrain	34
South Korea	29
Third place
26 October
Qatar	31
Saudi Arabia	21

5–8th place semifinals
24 October
India	21
Kuwait	34
24 October
Iran	48
Hong Kong	16

Fifth place
25 October
Kuwait	25
Iran	27
Seventh place
25 October
India	26
Hong Kong	30

===== 5–8th place semifinals =====
24 October 2019; 12:00	India	21–34	Kuwait	Duhail Handball Sports Hall, Doha
24 October 2019; 12:00		(12–17)		Duhail Handball Sports Hall, Doha

24 October 2019; 14:00	Iran	48–16	Hong Kong	Duhail Handball Sports Hall, Doha
24 October 2019; 14:00		(25–6)		Duhail Handball Sports Hall, Doha

===== Semifinals =====
24 October 2019; 16:00	South Korea	29–26	Saudi Arabia	Duhail Handball Sports Hall, Doha
24 October 2019; 16:00		(17–12)		Duhail Handball Sports Hall, Doha

24 October 2019; 18:00	Qatar	26–28	Bahrain	Duhail Handball Sports Hall, Doha
24 October 2019; 18:00		(15–16)		Duhail Handball Sports Hall, Doha

===== Seventh place game =====
25 October 2019; 16:00	India	26–30	Hong Kong	Duhail Handball Sports Hall, Doha
25 October 2019; 16:00		(13–11)		Duhail Handball Sports Hall, Doha

===== Fifth place game =====
25 October 2019; 18:00	Kuwait	25–27	Iran	Duhail Handball Sports Hall, Doha
25 October 2019; 18:00		(14–11)		Duhail Handball Sports Hall, Doha

===== Third place game =====
26 October 2019; 16:00	Qatar	31–21	Saudi Arabia	Duhail Handball Sports Hall, Doha
26 October 2019; 16:00		(16–12)		Duhail Handball Sports Hall, Doha

===== Final =====
26 October 2019; 18:00	Bahrain	34–29	South Korea	Duhail Handball Sports Hall, Doha
26 October 2019; 18:00		(13–15)		Duhail Handball Sports Hall, Doha

==== Final standing ====
Rank	Team
1st place, gold medalist(s)	Bahrain
2nd place, silver medalist(s)	South Korea
3rd place, bronze medalist(s)	Qatar
4	Saudi Arabia
5	Iran
6	Kuwait
7	Hong Kong
8	India

=== America ===
Rank	Team
1st place, gold medalist(s)	Argentina
2nd place, silver medalist(s)	Chile
3rd place, bronze medalist(s)	Brazil
4	Mexico
5	Cuba
6	United States
7	Puerto Rico
8	Peru

=== Africa ===
Rank	Team
Gold medal	Egypt
Silver medal	Tunisia
Bronze medal	Algeria
4	Angola
5	Cape Verde
6	Morocco
7	DR Congo
8	Gabon
9	Congo
10	Guinea
11	Nigeria
12	Cameroon
13	Libya
14	Ivory Coast
15	Kenya
16	Zambia

== Olympic Qualification Tournaments ==
=== 2020 Olympic Qualification Tournament #1 ===
Pos	Team	Pld	W	D	L	GF	GA	GD	Pts	Qualification
1	Norway	3	3	0	0	114	74	+40	6	2020 Summer Olympics
2	Brazil	3	2	0	1	76	80	−4	4	2020 Summer Olympics
3	South Korea	3	1	0	2	91	109	−18	2	
4	Chile	3	0	0	3	82	100	−18	0	

Source: IHF
Rules for classification: 1) Points; 2) Head-to-head points; 3) Head-to-head goal difference; 4) Head-to-head goals scored; 5) Goal difference; 6) Goals scored; 7) Draw.

=== 2020 Olympic Qualification Tournament #2 ===
Pos	Team	Pld	W	D	L	GF	GA	GD	Pts	Qualification
1	France (H)	3	2	0	1	98	84	+14	4 (Note: France 2 Pts, +3 GD; Portugal 2 Pts, 0 GD; Croatia 2 Pts, –3 GD)	2020 Summer Olympics
2	Portugal	3	2	0	1	87	80	+7	4	2020 Summer Olympics
3	Croatia	3	2	0	1	81	81	0	4	
4	Tunisia	3	0	0	3	83	104	−21	0	

Source: IHF
Rules for classification: 1) Points; 2) Head-to-head points; 3) Head-to-head goal difference; 4) Head-to-head goals scored; 5) Goal difference; 6) Goals scored; 7) Draw.
(H) Hosts

=== 2020 Olympic Qualification Tournament #3 ===
Pos	Team	Pld	W	D	L	GF	GA	GD	Pts	Qualification
1	Sweden	3	2	1	0	93	75	+18	5 (Note: Germany 25–25 Sweden)	2020 Summer Olympics
2	Germany (H)	3	2	1	0	95	78	+17	5	2020 Summer Olympics
3	Slovenia	3	1	0	2	88	96	−8	2	
4	Algeria	3	0	0	3	79	106	−27	0	

Source: IHF
Rules for classification: 1) Points; 2) Head-to-head points; 3) Head-to-head goal difference; 4) Head-to-head goals scored; 5) Goal difference; 6) Goals scored; 7) Draw.
(H) Hosts
