= Andrzej Rojewski =

Polish handball player (born 1985)

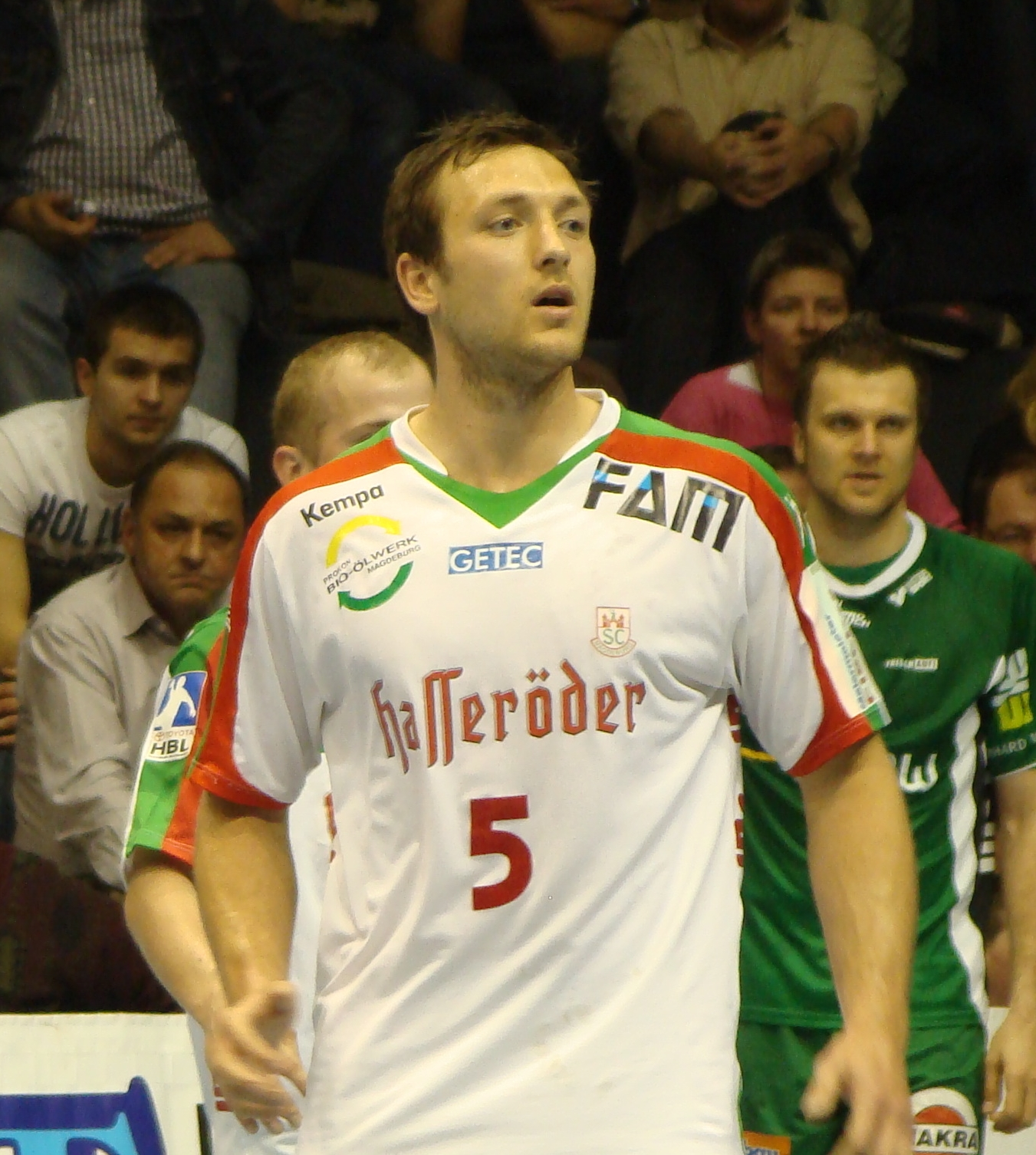

Personal information
- Nationality: Polish
- Born: 20 August 1985 (age 41) Wejherowo, Poland
- Height: 1.93 m (6 ft 4 in)

Sport
- Sport: Handball
- Position: Right back

Senior clubs
- Years: Team
- 2003–2016: SC Magdeburg
- 2016–2018: SC DHfK Leipzig
National team
Years	Team	Apps	(Gls)
2008–2013	Germany	6	(12)
2014–2016	Poland	16	(31)
Medal record
World Championship
Bronze medal – third place	2015 Qatar	Team

Andrzej Zdzisław Rojewski (born 20 August 1985) is a Polish handball player. He is currently a free agent
