= Ayatallah el Khoumini Hamoud =

Algerian handball player (born 1990)

Personal information
- Nationality: Algerian
- Born: 10 August 1990 (age 36) Aïn Touta, Algeria
- Height: 1.78 m (5 ft 10 in)

Sport
- Sport: Handball
- Position: Left wing

Senior clubs
- Years: Team
- 2009-2021: ES Ain Touta
- 2022-: AS St Brice
National team
Years	Team	Apps	(Gls)
2021-	Algeria	75	(180)

Ayatallah el Khoumini Hamoud (born 10 August 1990) is an Algerian handball player for French club AS St Brice. He has previously played for ES Ain Touta.

He competed for the Algerian national team at the 2015 World Men's Handball Championship in Qatar.

He also participated at the 2011 and 2013 World Championships.
