= Mojtaba Karamian =

Iranian handball player (born 1989)

Personal information
- Nationality: Iranian
- Born: 13 March 1989 (age 37)
- Height: 1.98 m (6 ft 6 in)

Sport
- Sport: Handball
- Position: Pivot
- Current club: Sskc Club
National team
Years	Team	Apps	(Gls)
–	Iran	23	(217)

Mojtaba Karamian (Persian: مجتبی کرمیان, born 13 March 1989) is an Iranian handball player for Sskc Club and the Iranian national team.

Karamian played in the World cup Qatar 2015 and at the 2009 Men's Junior World Handball Championship in Egypt, in the 2007 Men's Youth World Handball Championship in Bahrain, and in student world cup 2005, 1st of Asian young team Iran 2006, 2nd of Asian young team Jordan 2008,

He played in Iran handball league for 15 years, and was member of Iran national team in Olympic for the qualifying Qatar 2019 and for the World Cup qualifiers Kuwait 2020.
