= Lusail Sports Arena =

Multi-purpose indoor arena in Lusail, Qatar

- Lusail Multipurpose Hall
- Interactive map of Lusail Sports Arena
- Location: Lusail, Qatar
- Coordinates: 25.4809°N 51.4634°E
- Owner: Qatar Olympic Committee
- Capacity: 15,300

Construction
- Groundbreaking: 2012; 14 years ago
- Built: 2012–2014
- Opened: 2014; 12 years ago
- Cost: US$ 318 Million
- Architects: Alastair Richardson; Dar Al-Handasah
- Main contractor: Consolidated Contractors Company

Lusail Sports Arena, also known as Lusail Multipurpose Hall, is an indoor sports arena located in Lusail, Qatar. It occupies an area of 140,000 m^{2} (1,500,000 sq ft) in Al Ahli Sports Village. With a seating capacity of over 15,300, it is built to host sporting events including handball, volleyball and basketball tournaments, music concerts etc. One of the largest event hosted at the stadium was the 2015 World Men's Handball Championship. It will host matches for the 2027 FIBA Basketball World Cup including the final phase. This was the venue's debut for ONE Championship's ONE 166.

On 18 January 2019, the arena hosted its biggest music event, a live concert by Arijit Singh presented by OneFM Radio in association with Shop Qatar and ticketing partner WanasaTime.

== Construction ==
The construction of the spectator stadium began in 2012 with a cost of approximately US$318 Million. Dar Al-Handasah designed the sports arena having been commissioned by the Qatar Olympic Committee. The arena was designed to reflect the local Qatari culture featuring the colors of the sea, pearls and the desert sands blended with a central dome inspired by the classic Islamic architecture. The building is designed in a way to reduce the cooling demand by using fritting, shading and bright finishing to minimize the heat effects. It also optimizes the ratio of opaque and glazed walls.

== Notable events hosted ==
=== MMA and Kickboxing shows ===
Date	Show	Main event
1 March 2024	ONE 166	Reinier de Ridder vs. Anatoly Malykhin
20 February 2025	ONE 171	Joshua Pacio vs. Jarred Brooks III

=== Boxing matches ===
Date	Competition	Main event	Result	Ref.
28 November 2024	MF & DAZN: X Series 19 – Qatar: The Supercard	AnEsonGib vs Slim	Gib defeated Albaher via Majority Decision	

== Gallery ==
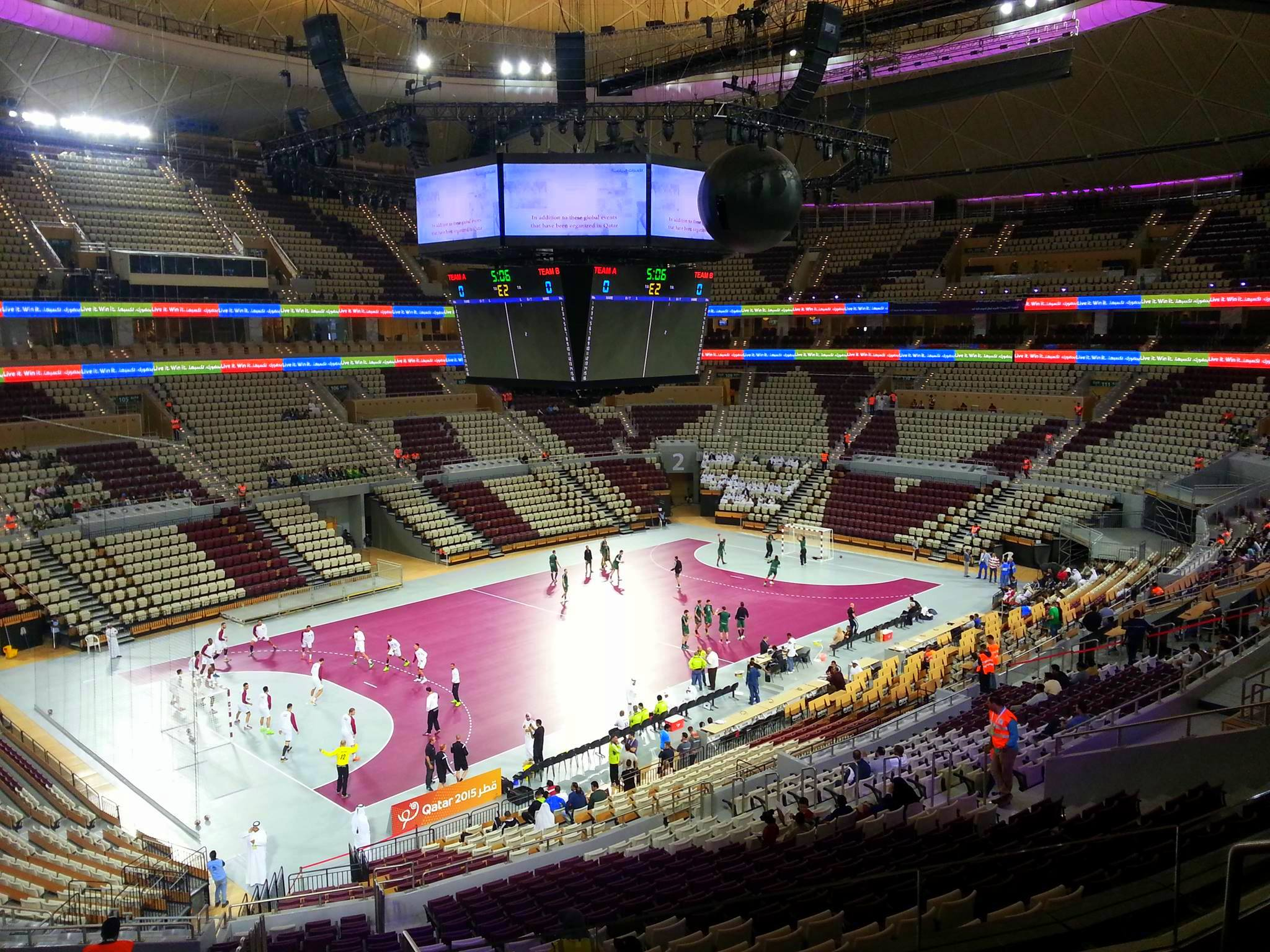
Lusail sports Arena, interior

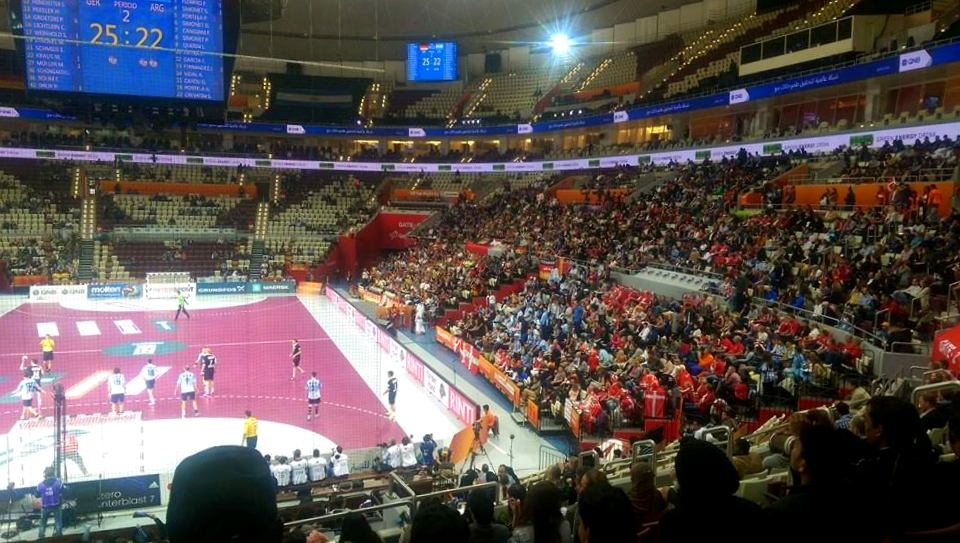
Germany vs Argentina, Lusail Arena

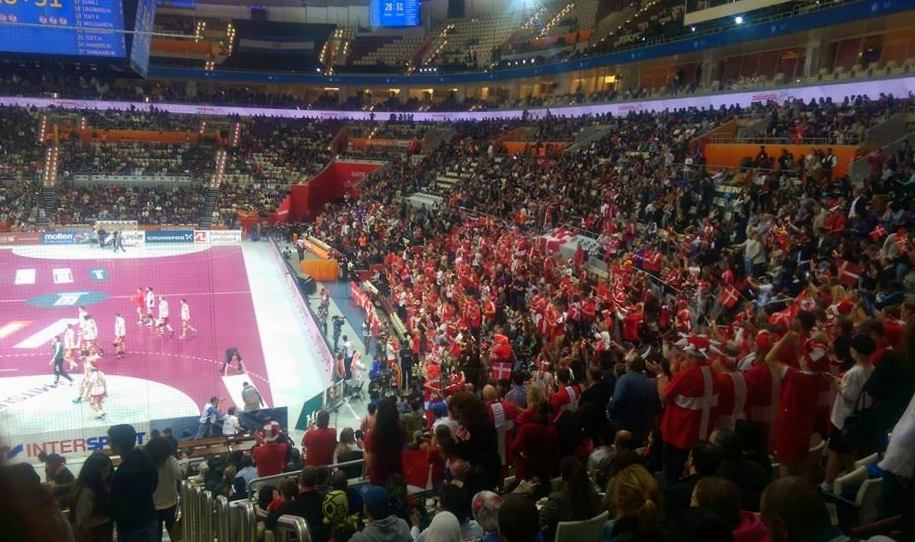
Denmark vs Russia, Lusail Arena

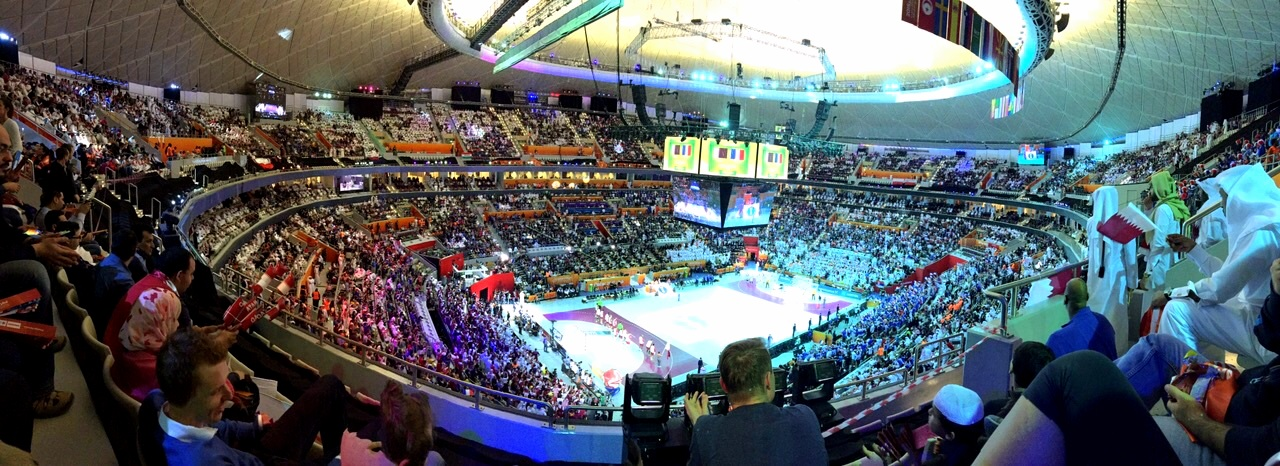
Final, Qatar vs France

Preceded by Palau Sant Jordi; Barcelona	World Men's Handball Championship; Final Venue; 2015	Succeeded by AccorHotels Arena; Paris
Preceded by SM Mall of Asia Arena; Pasay	FIBA World Cup; Final venue 2027	Succeeded by Paris La Défense Arena; Paris
