= Valentin Porte =

French handball player (born 1990)

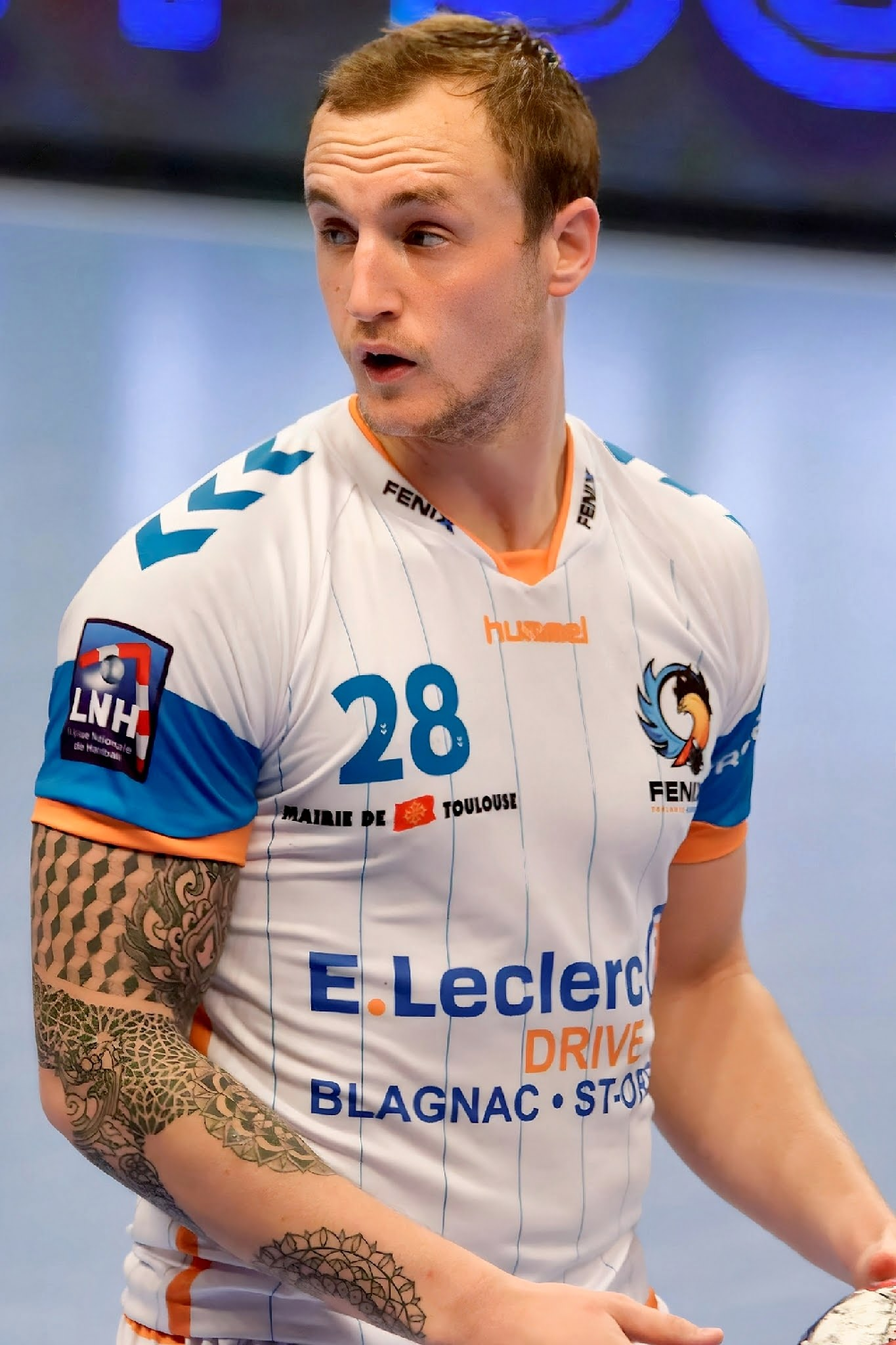
- Porte in 2016

Personal information
- Nationality: French
- Born: 7 September 1990 (age 36) Versailles, France
- Height: 1.90 m (6 ft 3 in)

Sport
- Sport: Handball
- Position: Right back/wing
- Current club: Montpellier Handball
- Number: 28

Youth career
- Years: Team
- 1996–2006: HBC Toury
- 2006–2008: Mainvilliers-Chartres HB

Senior clubs
- Years: Team
- 2008–2016: Fenix Toulouse
- 2016–: Montpellier Handball
National team
Years	Team	Apps	(Gls)
2013–2024	France	198	(438)
Medal record
Olympic Games
Gold medal – first place	2020 Tokyo	Team
Silver medal – second place	2016 Rio de Janeiro	Team
World Championship
Gold medal – first place	2015 Qatar
Gold medal – first place	2017 France
Silver medal – second place	2023 Poland/Sweden
Bronze medal – third place	2019 Germany/Denmark
European Championship
Gold medal – first place	2014 Denmark
Gold medal – first place	2024 Germany
Bronze medal – third place	2018 Croatia

Valentin Porte (born 7 September 1990) is a French handball player for Montpellier Handball.

He won the European title in 2014, the world title in 2015 and 2017, and an Olympic gold medal in 2020. He also won EHF Champions League in 2018 with Montpellier.

He normally plays as a right wing, but can also play as a right back.

== Career ==
Porte senior debut came in the French top flight, Starligue, in 2008 for Fenix Toulouse Handball.

In the summer of 2016 he joined league rivals Montpellier Handball. Here, he won the EHF Champions League in 2018 and the Coupe de France in 2025.

=== National team ===
He debuted for the French national team in 2013, and his first major international tournament was the World Championship the same year. In 2015, he won the World Championship in Qatar.

At the 2016 Olympics, he won a silver medal with the french team, and was in the tournament all-star team.
