= 2015 World Men's Handball Championship =

Tournament details
- Host country: Qatar
- Venues: 3 (in 3 host cities)
- Dates: 15 January – 1 February
- Teams: 24 (from 4 confederations)

Final positions
- Champions: France (5th title)
- Runners-up: Qatar
- Third place: Poland
- Fourth place: Spain

Tournament statistics
- Matches played: 88
- Goals scored: 4,805 (54.6 per match)
- Attendance: 306,100 (3,478 per match)
- Top scorer: Dragan Gajić (SVN) (71 goals)

Awards
- Best player: Thierry Omeyer (FRA)

The 2015 World Men's Handball Championship was the 24th staging of the World Men's Handball Championship, organised by the International Handball Federation (IHF). The final tournament was held for the first time in Qatar, from 15 January to 1 February 2015. The Qatari bid was selected over those of Norway, Poland and France after a vote by the IHF Council on 27 January 2011, in Malmö, Sweden. This was the third time that the World Championship was hosted in the Middle East And North Africa, after Egypt in 1999 and Tunisia in 2005.

France won the final against Qatar 25–22 to win their fifth title, a first in handball history while Qatar won their first ever medal. Poland captured the bronze medal by defeating Spain 29–28 after extra time. Denmark secured the fifth place by winning against Croatia which finished sixth and thus had the worst result in the past 13 years of international handball competing.

The competition was marred by numerous controversies throughout.

== Venues ==
The games of the tournament were played in 3 cities: Doha, Al Rayyan and the newly created town of Lusail.

Three new venues were constructed for the tournament:

- Lusail Sports Arena in the town of Lusail: with a capacity of 15,300 seats, Lusail Sports Arena became the main venue of the tournament. The hall opened in November 2014.
- Ali Bin Hamad Al Attiya Arena in the town of Al Rayyan: with a capacity of 7,700 seats. The hall is part of the Al-Sadd Club sports complex.
- Duhail Handball Sports Hall in the capital Doha: with a capacity of 5,500 spectators. The hall is part of the Qatar Handball Association (QHA) complex.

Lusail	Al Rayyan	Doha	Location of the host cities of the 2015 World Men's Handball Championship.
Lusail Sports Arena	Ali Bin Hamad Al Attiya Arena	Duhail Handball Sports Hall	Location of the host cities of the 2015 World Men's Handball Championship.
Capacity: 15,300	Capacity: 7,700	Capacity: 5,500	Location of the host cities of the 2015 World Men's Handball Championship.

== Qualification ==
Twenty-four teams participated in the final tournament. Qatar, as hosts and Spain, as world champions, were automatically qualified, which left 22 places available for the best teams of each continental qualification tournament and the winners of an additional European qualification competition.

In a decision taken by the International Handball Federation on 8 July 2014 the spot allocated for a nation from Oceania was revoked on the grounds that Oceania has no continental confederation. The national team, qualified for this spot through the 2014 Oceania Handball Championship, was Australia. The spot was instead handed out as a wild card to the nation with the highest ranking at the previous world championships not qualified for the Qatar tournament. This nation was Germany. Bahrain and the United Arab Emirates withdrew on 7 November 2014. Iceland and Saudi Arabia were chosen as the replacements.

Competition	Dates	Vacancies	Qualified
Host nation	27 January 2011	1	Qatar
2013 World Champions	11–27 January 2013	1	Spain
2014 African Men's Handball Championship	16–25 January 2014	3	Algeria; Egypt; Tunisia
2014 European Men's Handball Championship	12–26 January 2014	3	Croatia; Denmark; France
2014 Asian Men's Handball Championship	24 January – 4 February 2014	3	~~Bahrain~~; Iran; ~~United Arab Emirates~~
2014 Oceania Handball Championship	25–26 April 2014	1	~~Australia~~
European qualification	7–15 June 2014	9	Austria; Belarus; Bosnia and Herzegovina; Czech Republic; North Macedonia; Poland; Russia; Slovenia; Sweden
2014 Pan American Men's Handball Championship	23–29 June 2014	3	Argentina; Brazil; Chile
Wildcard	8 July 2014	1	Germany
Wildcards	21 November 2014	2	Iceland; Saudi Arabia

=== Qualified teams ===
Country	Qualified as	Qualified on	Previous appearances^{1, 2}
Qatar	Hosts	27 January 2011	4 (2003, 2005, 2007, 2013)
Spain	World champions	27 January 2013	17 (1958, 1974, 1978, 1982, 1986, 1990, 1993, 1995, 1997, 1999, 2001, 2003, **2005**, 2007, 2009, 2011, **2013**)
Denmark	Finalist of 2014 European Championship	22 January 2014	20 (1938, 1954, 1958, 1961, 1964, 1967, 1970, 1974, 1978, 1982, 1986, 1993, 1995, 1999, 2003, 2005, 2007, 2009, 2011, 2013)
France	Finalist of 2014 European Championship	22 January 2014	19 (1954, 1958, 1961, 1964, 1967,1970, 1978, 1990, 1993, **1995**, 1997, 1999, **2001**, 2003, 2005, 2007, **2009**, **2011**, 2013)
Croatia	Fourth of 2014 European Championship	22 January 2014	10 (1995, 1997, 1999, 2001, **2003**, 2005, 2007, 2009, 2011, 2013)
Algeria	Finalist of 2014 African Championship	24 January 2014	13 (1974, 1982, 1986, 1990, 1995, 1997, 1999, 2001, 2003, 2005, 2009, 2011, 2013)
Tunisia	Finalist of 2014 African Championship	24 January 2014	11 (1967, 1995, 1997, 1999, 2001, 2003, 2005, 2007, 2009, 2011, 2013)
Egypt	Third place of 2014 African Championship	25 January 2014	12 (1964, 1993, 1995, 1997, 1999, 2001, 2003, 2005, 2007, 2009, 2011, 2013)
~~Bahrain~~	Finalist of 2014 Asian Championship	1 February 2014	1 (2011)
Iran	Semifinalist of 2014 Asian Championship	2 February 2014	0 (debut)
~~United Arab Emirates~~	Semifinalist of 2014 Asian Championship	3 February 2014	0 (debut)
~~Australia~~	Winner of 2014 Oceania Championship	26 April 2014	7 (1999, 2003, 2005, 2007, 2009, 2011, 2013)
Poland	European playoffs	14 June 2014	13 (1958, 1967, 1970, 1974, 1978, 1982, 1986, 1990, 2003, 2007, 2009, 2011, 2013)
Russia	European playoffs	14 June 2014	10 (**1993**, 1995, **1997**, 1999, 2001, 2003, 2005, 2007, 2009, 2013)
Czech Republic	European playoffs	14 June 2014	5 (1995, 1997, 2001, 2005, 2007)
Austria	European playoffs	14 June 2014	4 (1938, 1958, 1993, 2011)
Sweden	European playoffs	15 June 2014	21 (1938, **1954**, **1958**, 1961, 1964, 1967, 1970, 1974, 1978, 1982, 1986, **1990**, 1993, 1995, 1997, **1999**, 2001, 2003, 2005, 2009, 2011)
Slovenia	European playoffs	15 June 2014	6 (1995, 2001, 2003, 2005, 2007, 2013)
North Macedonia	European playoffs	15 June 2014	3 (1999, 2009, 2013)
Belarus	European playoffs	15 June 2014	2 (1995, 2013)
Bosnia and Herzegovina	European playoffs	15 June 2014	0 (debut)
Brazil	Finalist of 2014 Pan American Championship	28 June 2014	11 (1958, 1995, 1997, 1999, 2001, 2003, 2005, 2007, 2009, 2011, 2013)
Argentina	Finalist of 2014 Pan American Championship	28 June 2014	9 (1997, 1999, 2001, 2003, 2005, 2007, 2009, 2011, 2013)
Chile	Third at 2014 Pan American Championship	29 June 2014	2 (2011, 2013)
Germany	Wildcard	8 July 2014	22 (**1938**, 1954, 1958, 1961, 1964, 1967, 1970, 1974, **1978**, 1982, 1986, 1990^{3}, 1993, 1995, 1999, 2001, 2003, 2005, **2007**, 2009, 2011, 2013)
Iceland	Wildcard	21 November 2014	17 (1958, 1961, 1964, 1970, 1974, 1978, 1986, 1990, 1993, 1995, 1997, 2001, 2003, 2005, 2007, 2011, 2013)
Saudi Arabia	Wildcard	21 November 2014	6 (1997, 1999, 2001, 2003, 2009, 2013)

^{1} Bold indicates champion for that year
^{2} Italics indicates host country for that year
^{3} From both German teams only East Germany was qualified in 1990

== Draw ==
The draw was held on 20 July 2014 at 21:30 local time in Doha, Qatar.

=== Seedings ===
The seedings were published on 11 July 2014.

Pot 1	Pot 2	Pot 3	Pot 4	Pot 5	Pot 6
Spain; France; Denmark; Croatia	Bosnia and Herzegovina; Poland; Sweden; Slovenia	Russia; Qatar; North Macedonia; Algeria	Austria; Argentina; Belarus; Czech Republic	Tunisia; Egypt; Brazil; ~~Bahrain~~ → Saudi Arabia	Iran; ~~United Arab Emirates~~ → Iceland; Chile; ~~Australia~~ → Germany

== Squads ==
Each team selects 16 players for the tournament.

== Referees ==
18 referee pairs are selected:

Referees
Brazil	Jesus Menezes; Rogéro Pinto
Croatia	Matija Gubica; Boris Milošević
Czech Republic	Václav Horáček; Jiří Novotný
Denmark	Martin Gjeding; Mads Hansen
Egypt	Mohamed Rashed; Tamer El-Sayed
France	Laurent Reveret; Stevann Pichon
Germany	Lars Geipel; Marcus Helbig
Japan	Kiyoshi Hizaki; Tomokazu Ikebuchi
Lithuania	Mindaugas Gatelis; Vaidas Mažeika

Referees
Macedonia	Gjorgji Nachevski; Slave Nikolov
Portugal	Duarte Santos; Ricardo Fonseca
Qatar	Saleh Bamutref; Mansour Al-Suwaidi
Serbia	Nenad Nikolić; Dušan Stojković
Slovenia	Nenad Krstić; Peter Ljubič
South Korea	Bon-ok Koo; Seok Lee
Spain	Óscar López; Ángel Ramírez
Sweden	Michael Johansson; Jasmin Kliko
Tunisia	Samir Krichen; Samir Makhlouf

== Preliminary round ==
The schedule was published on 21 August 2014. A new schedule was released on 12 December 2014. The top four teams from each group advanced to the knockout stage.

=== Tie-breaking criteria ===
For the group stage of this tournament, where two or more teams in a group tied on an equal number of points, the finishing positions will be determined by the following tie-breaking criteria in the following order:

1. number of points obtained in the matches among the teams in question
2. goal difference in the matches among the teams in question
3. number of goals scored in the matches among the teams in question (if more than two teams finish equal on points)
4. goal difference in all the group matches
5. number of goals scored in all the group matches
6. drawing of lots

Team advanced to the knockout stage

All times are local (UTC+3).

=== Group A ===
Team	Pld	W	D	L	GF	GA	GD	Pts
Spain	5	5	0	0	162	127	+35	10
Qatar	5	4	0	1	137	122	+15	8
Slovenia	5	3	0	2	160	145	+15	6
Brazil	5	2	0	3	146	143	+3	4
Belarus	5	1	0	4	147	155	−8	2
Chile	5	0	0	5	104	164	−60	0

15 January 2015; 20:30	Qatar	28–23	Brazil	Lusail Sports Arena, Lusail; Attendance: 11,500; Referees: Milošević, Gubica (CRO)
15 January 2015; 20:30	Hassab Alla, Marković 6	(15–12)	Chiuffa 6	Lusail Sports Arena, Lusail; Attendance: 11,500; Referees: Milošević, Gubica (CRO)
15 January 2015; 20:30	3× (yellow card) 4× (suspension)	Report	3× (yellow card) 5× (suspension) 1× (red card)	Lusail Sports Arena, Lusail; Attendance: 11,500; Referees: Milošević, Gubica (CRO)

16 January 2015; 17:00	Spain	38–33	Belarus	Duhail Handball Sports Hall, Doha; Attendance: 1,200; Referees: Novotný, Horáček (CZE)
16 January 2015; 17:00	Aguinagalde, Maqueda 6	(21–17)	Tsitou 5	Duhail Handball Sports Hall, Doha; Attendance: 1,200; Referees: Novotný, Horáček (CZE)
16 January 2015; 17:00	3× (yellow card) 2× (suspension)	Report	3× (yellow card) 3× (suspension) 2× (red card)	Duhail Handball Sports Hall, Doha; Attendance: 1,200; Referees: Novotný, Horáček (CZE)

16 January 2015; 17:00	Slovenia	36–23	Chile	Ali Bin Hamad Al Attiya Arena, Al Rayyan; Attendance: 1,500; Referees: Rashed, El-Sayed (EGY)
16 January 2015; 17:00	Gajić 9	(16–14)	R. Salinas 10	Ali Bin Hamad Al Attiya Arena, Al Rayyan; Attendance: 1,500; Referees: Rashed, El-Sayed (EGY)
16 January 2015; 17:00	3× (yellow card) 8× (suspension)	Report	1× (yellow card) 6× (suspension)	Ali Bin Hamad Al Attiya Arena, Al Rayyan; Attendance: 1,500; Referees: Rashed, El-Sayed (EGY)

17 January 2015; 17:00	Brazil	27–29	Spain	Duhail Handball Sports Hall, Doha; Attendance: 800; Referees: Nachevski, Nikolov (MKD)
17 January 2015; 17:00	Ribeiro, Toledo 5	(14–15)	Cañellas 9	Duhail Handball Sports Hall, Doha; Attendance: 800; Referees: Nachevski, Nikolov (MKD)
17 January 2015; 17:00	4× (yellow card) 5× (suspension)	Report	3× (yellow card) 2× (suspension)	Duhail Handball Sports Hall, Doha; Attendance: 800; Referees: Nachevski, Nikolov (MKD)

17 January 2015; 17:00	Belarus	29–34	Slovenia	Lusail Sports Arena, Lusail; Attendance: 4,000; Referees: Krichen, Makhlouf (TUN)
17 January 2015; 17:00	D. Rutenka 6	(8–17)	Gajić 15	Lusail Sports Arena, Lusail; Attendance: 4,000; Referees: Krichen, Makhlouf (TUN)
17 January 2015; 17:00	3× (yellow card) 5× (suspension)	Report	4× (yellow card) 8× (suspension) 1× (red card)	Lusail Sports Arena, Lusail; Attendance: 4,000; Referees: Krichen, Makhlouf (TUN)

17 January 2015; 19:00	Chile	20–27	Qatar	Lusail Sports Arena, Lusail; Attendance: 4,500; Referees: Reveret, Pichon (FRA)
17 January 2015; 19:00	Oneto 5	(9–15)	Marković 11	Lusail Sports Arena, Lusail; Attendance: 4,500; Referees: Reveret, Pichon (FRA)
17 January 2015; 19:00	3× (yellow card) 5× (suspension)	Report	3× (yellow card) 2× (suspension)	Lusail Sports Arena, Lusail; Attendance: 4,500; Referees: Reveret, Pichon (FRA)

19 January 2015; 17:00	Spain	37–16	Chile	Duhail Handball Sports Hall, Doha; Attendance: 500; Referees: Lee, Koo (KOR)
19 January 2015; 17:00	Rivera Folch 7	(14–7)	Araya, Frelijj 3	Duhail Handball Sports Hall, Doha; Attendance: 500; Referees: Lee, Koo (KOR)
19 January 2015; 17:00	3× (yellow card) 3× (suspension)	Report	4× (yellow card) 1× (suspension)	Duhail Handball Sports Hall, Doha; Attendance: 500; Referees: Lee, Koo (KOR)

19 January 2015; 17:00	Belarus	29–34	Brazil	Lusail Sports Arena, Lusail; Attendance: 3,000; Referees: Rashed, El-Sayed (EGY)
19 January 2015; 17:00	three players 6	(12–16)	Ribeiro 9	Lusail Sports Arena, Lusail; Attendance: 3,000; Referees: Rashed, El-Sayed (EGY)
19 January 2015; 17:00	3× (yellow card) 5× (suspension)	Report	4× (yellow card) 5× (suspension)	Lusail Sports Arena, Lusail; Attendance: 3,000; Referees: Rashed, El-Sayed (EGY)

19 January 2015; 19:00	Slovenia	29–31	Qatar	Lusail Sports Arena, Lusail; Attendance: 9,500; Referees: Gjeding, Hansen (DEN)
19 January 2015; 19:00	Dolenec 8	(15–18)	Capote 12	Lusail Sports Arena, Lusail; Attendance: 9,500; Referees: Gjeding, Hansen (DEN)
19 January 2015; 19:00	3× (yellow card) 7× (suspension)	Report	4× (yellow card) 5× (suspension)	Lusail Sports Arena, Lusail; Attendance: 9,500; Referees: Gjeding, Hansen (DEN)

21 January 2015; 17:00	Slovenia	35–32	Brazil	Duhail Handball Sports Hall, Doha; Attendance: 500; Referees: Reveret, Pichon (FRA)
21 January 2015; 17:00	Gajić 12	(19–18)	Ribeiro 7	Duhail Handball Sports Hall, Doha; Attendance: 500; Referees: Reveret, Pichon (FRA)
21 January 2015; 17:00	2× (yellow card) 5× (suspension)	Report	3× (yellow card) 5× (suspension)	Duhail Handball Sports Hall, Doha; Attendance: 500; Referees: Reveret, Pichon (FRA)

21 January 2015; 17:00	Chile	23–34	Belarus	Lusail Sports Arena, Lusail; Attendance: 800; Referees: Hizaki, Ikebuchi (JPN)
21 January 2015; 17:00	R. Salinas 6	(11–14)	Pukhouski, S. Rutenka 8	Lusail Sports Arena, Lusail; Attendance: 800; Referees: Hizaki, Ikebuchi (JPN)
21 January 2015; 17:00	2× (yellow card) 7× (suspension) 1× (red card)	Report	3× (yellow card) 5× (suspension)	Lusail Sports Arena, Lusail; Attendance: 800; Referees: Hizaki, Ikebuchi (JPN)

21 January 2015; 19:00	Qatar	25–28	Spain	Lusail Sports Arena, Lusail; Attendance: 12,400; Referees: Nikolić, Stojković (SRB)
21 January 2015; 19:00	Marković 10	(10–8)	Rivera Folch 7	Lusail Sports Arena, Lusail; Attendance: 12,400; Referees: Nikolić, Stojković (SRB)
21 January 2015; 19:00	2× (yellow card) 1× (suspension)	Report	3× (yellow card) 5× (suspension)	Lusail Sports Arena, Lusail; Attendance: 12,400; Referees: Nikolić, Stojković (SRB)

23 January 2015; 17:00	Brazil	30–22	Chile	Lusail Sports Arena, Lusail; Attendance: 2,500; Referees: Krichen, Makhlouf (TUN)
23 January 2015; 17:00	Pacheco Filho 7	(12–13)	five players 3	Lusail Sports Arena, Lusail; Attendance: 2,500; Referees: Krichen, Makhlouf (TUN)
23 January 2015; 17:00	1× (yellow card) 5× (suspension)	Report	4× (yellow card) 7× (suspension) 1× (red card)	Lusail Sports Arena, Lusail; Attendance: 2,500; Referees: Krichen, Makhlouf (TUN)

23 January 2015; 17:00	Spain	30–26	Slovenia	Duhail Handball Sports Hall, Doha; Attendance: 1,000; Referees: Geipel, Helbig (GER)
23 January 2015; 17:00	Rivera Folch 6	(14–10)	four players 4	Duhail Handball Sports Hall, Doha; Attendance: 1,000; Referees: Geipel, Helbig (GER)
23 January 2015; 17:00	3× (yellow card) 2× (suspension) 1× (red card)	Report	3× (yellow card) 5× (suspension)	Duhail Handball Sports Hall, Doha; Attendance: 1,000; Referees: Geipel, Helbig (GER)

23 January 2015; 19:00	Qatar	26–22	Belarus	Lusail Sports Arena, Lusail; Attendance: 10,000; Referees: Novotný, Horáček (CZE)
23 January 2015; 19:00	Marković 9	(7–12)	D. Rutenka 7	Lusail Sports Arena, Lusail; Attendance: 10,000; Referees: Novotný, Horáček (CZE)
23 January 2015; 19:00	2× (yellow card) 3× (suspension)	Report	4× (yellow card) 6× (suspension)	Lusail Sports Arena, Lusail; Attendance: 10,000; Referees: Novotný, Horáček (CZE)

=== Group B ===
Team	Pld	W	D	L	GF	GA	GD	Pts
Croatia	5	5	0	0	158	124	+34	10
North Macedonia	5	4	0	1	153	138	+15	8
Austria	5	2	1	2	147	140	+7	5
Tunisia	5	2	1	2	132	133	−1	5
Bosnia and Herzegovina	5	1	0	4	118	128	−10	2
Iran	5	0	0	5	127	172	−45	0

16 January 2015; 15:00	Bosnia and Herzegovina	30–25	Iran	Lusail Sports Arena, Lusail; Attendance: 4,000; Referees: Koo, Lee (KOR)
16 January 2015; 15:00	Čelica 6	(12–16)	A. Esteki 7	Lusail Sports Arena, Lusail; Attendance: 4,000; Referees: Koo, Lee (KOR)
16 January 2015; 15:00	3× (yellow card) 8× (suspension)	Report	4× (yellow card) 8× (suspension)	Lusail Sports Arena, Lusail; Attendance: 4,000; Referees: Koo, Lee (KOR)

16 January 2015; 17:00	North Macedonia	33–25	Tunisia	Lusail Sports Arena, Lusail; Attendance: 5,000; Referees: Geipel, Helbig (GER)
16 January 2015; 17:00	K. Lazarov 10	(18–14)	Tej 6	Lusail Sports Arena, Lusail; Attendance: 5,000; Referees: Geipel, Helbig (GER)
16 January 2015; 17:00	3× (yellow card) 7× (suspension)	Report	3× (yellow card) 6× (suspension)	Lusail Sports Arena, Lusail; Attendance: 5,000; Referees: Geipel, Helbig (GER)

16 January 2015; 19:00	Croatia	32–30	Austria	Duhail Handball Sports Hall, Doha; Attendance: 750; Referees: Gatelis, Mažeika (LTU)
16 January 2015; 19:00	Čupić 11	(16–13)	Szilágyi, Weber 7	Duhail Handball Sports Hall, Doha; Attendance: 750; Referees: Gatelis, Mažeika (LTU)
16 January 2015; 19:00	3× (yellow card) 6× (suspension)	Report	4× (yellow card) 7× (suspension) 1× (red card)	Duhail Handball Sports Hall, Doha; Attendance: 750; Referees: Gatelis, Mažeika (LTU)

17 January 2015; 19:00	Tunisia	25–28	Croatia	Duhail Handball Sports Hall, Doha; Attendance: 4,000; Referees: López, Ramírez (ESP)
17 January 2015; 19:00	Bannour 9	(13–14)	Čupić 8	Duhail Handball Sports Hall, Doha; Attendance: 4,000; Referees: López, Ramírez (ESP)
17 January 2015; 19:00	3× (yellow card) 6× (suspension)	Report	3× (yellow card) 5× (suspension)	Duhail Handball Sports Hall, Doha; Attendance: 4,000; Referees: López, Ramírez (ESP)

17 January 2015; 19:00	Iran	31–33	North Macedonia	Ali Bin Hamad Al Attiya Arena, Al Rayyan; Attendance: 1,000; Referees: Al-Suwaidi, Bamutref (QAT)
17 January 2015; 19:00	A. Esteki 9	(17–19)	K. Lazarov 9	Ali Bin Hamad Al Attiya Arena, Al Rayyan; Attendance: 1,000; Referees: Al-Suwaidi, Bamutref (QAT)
17 January 2015; 19:00	4× (yellow card) 7× (suspension) 1× (red card)	Report	2× (yellow card) 7× (suspension)	Ali Bin Hamad Al Attiya Arena, Al Rayyan; Attendance: 1,000; Referees: Al-Suwaidi, Bamutref (QAT)

17 January 2015; 21:00	Austria	23–21	Bosnia and Herzegovina	Ali Bin Hamad Al Attiya Arena, Al Rayyan; Attendance: 1,000; Referees: Menezes, Pinto (BRA)
17 January 2015; 21:00	Szilágyi, Weber 4	(11–12)	Malinović 6	Ali Bin Hamad Al Attiya Arena, Al Rayyan; Attendance: 1,000; Referees: Menezes, Pinto (BRA)
17 January 2015; 21:00	3× (yellow card) 8× (suspension)	Report	4× (yellow card) 6× (suspension) 1× (red card)	Ali Bin Hamad Al Attiya Arena, Al Rayyan; Attendance: 1,000; Referees: Menezes, Pinto (BRA)

19 January 2015; 19:00	Bosnia and Herzegovina	22–25	North Macedonia	Ali Bin Hamad Al Attiya Arena, Al Rayyan; Attendance: 2,000; Referees: Gatelis, Mažeika (LTU)
19 January 2015; 19:00	Burić, Malinović 4	(11–13)	Manaskov 6	Ali Bin Hamad Al Attiya Arena, Al Rayyan; Attendance: 2,000; Referees: Gatelis, Mažeika (LTU)
19 January 2015; 19:00	2× (yellow card) 5× (suspension)	Report	3× (yellow card) 6× (suspension) 1× (red card)	Ali Bin Hamad Al Attiya Arena, Al Rayyan; Attendance: 2,000; Referees: Gatelis, Mažeika (LTU)

19 January 2015; 19:00	Croatia	41–22	Iran	Duhail Handball Sports Hall, Doha; Attendance: 500; Referees: Geipel, Helbig (GER)
19 January 2015; 19:00	Horvat 12	(19–13)	S. Esteki 6	Duhail Handball Sports Hall, Doha; Attendance: 500; Referees: Geipel, Helbig (GER)
19 January 2015; 19:00	2× (yellow card) 3× (suspension)	Report	1× (yellow card) 3× (suspension)	Duhail Handball Sports Hall, Doha; Attendance: 500; Referees: Geipel, Helbig (GER)

19 January 2015; 21:00	Austria	25–25	Tunisia	Ali Bin Hamad Al Attiya Arena, Al Rayyan; Attendance: 4,500; Referees: Nikolić, Stojković (SRB)
19 January 2015; 21:00	Weber 9	(14–15)	Sanaï, Tej 5	Ali Bin Hamad Al Attiya Arena, Al Rayyan; Attendance: 4,500; Referees: Nikolić, Stojković (SRB)
19 January 2015; 21:00	3× (yellow card) 4× (suspension)	Report	3× (yellow card) 5× (suspension)	Ali Bin Hamad Al Attiya Arena, Al Rayyan; Attendance: 4,500; Referees: Nikolić, Stojković (SRB)

21 January 2015; 17:00	Iran	26–38	Austria	Ali Bin Hamad Al Attiya Arena, Al Rayyan; Attendance: 500; Referees: Rashed, El-Sayed (EGY)
21 January 2015; 17:00	S. Esteki 7	(13–18)	Santos 8	Ali Bin Hamad Al Attiya Arena, Al Rayyan; Attendance: 500; Referees: Rashed, El-Sayed (EGY)
21 January 2015; 17:00	1× (yellow card) 5× (suspension)	Report	3× (yellow card) 5× (suspension)	Ali Bin Hamad Al Attiya Arena, Al Rayyan; Attendance: 500; Referees: Rashed, El-Sayed (EGY)

21 January 2015; 19:00	Bosnia and Herzegovina	24–27	Tunisia	Ali Bin Hamad Al Attiya Arena, Al Rayyan; Attendance: 5,500; Referees: Santos, Fonseca (POR)
21 January 2015; 19:00	Malinović 5	(14–15)	Boughanmi 7	Ali Bin Hamad Al Attiya Arena, Al Rayyan; Attendance: 5,500; Referees: Santos, Fonseca (POR)
21 January 2015; 19:00	4× (yellow card) 6× (suspension)	Report	3× (yellow card) 5× (suspension)	Ali Bin Hamad Al Attiya Arena, Al Rayyan; Attendance: 5,500; Referees: Santos, Fonseca (POR)

21 January 2015; 19:00	North Macedonia	26–29	Croatia	Duhail Handball Sports Hall, Doha; Attendance: 2,000; Referees: Novotný, Horáček (CZE)
21 January 2015; 19:00	K. Lazarov 7	(14–15)	Čupić 9	Duhail Handball Sports Hall, Doha; Attendance: 2,000; Referees: Novotný, Horáček (CZE)
21 January 2015; 19:00	4× (yellow card) 6× (suspension)	Report	4× (yellow card) 6× (suspension)	Duhail Handball Sports Hall, Doha; Attendance: 2,000; Referees: Novotný, Horáček (CZE)

23 January 2015; 17:00	Tunisia	30–23	Iran	Ali Bin Hamad Al Attiya Arena, Al Rayyan; Attendance: 4,500; Referees: Kliko, Johansson (SWE)
23 January 2015; 17:00	Touati 7	(12–12)	Karamian 4	Ali Bin Hamad Al Attiya Arena, Al Rayyan; Attendance: 4,500; Referees: Kliko, Johansson (SWE)
23 January 2015; 17:00	4× (yellow card) 3× (suspension)	Report	1× (yellow card) 5× (suspension)	Ali Bin Hamad Al Attiya Arena, Al Rayyan; Attendance: 4,500; Referees: Kliko, Johansson (SWE)

23 January 2015; 19:00	North Macedonia	36–31	Austria	Ali Bin Hamad Al Attiya Arena, Al Rayyan; Attendance: 1,000; Referees: Gjeding, Hansen (DEN)
23 January 2015; 19:00	K. Lazarov 9	(16–16)	Weber 8	Ali Bin Hamad Al Attiya Arena, Al Rayyan; Attendance: 1,000; Referees: Gjeding, Hansen (DEN)
23 January 2015; 19:00	2× (yellow card) 5× (suspension)	Report	2× (yellow card) 7× (suspension) 1× (red card)	Ali Bin Hamad Al Attiya Arena, Al Rayyan; Attendance: 1,000; Referees: Gjeding, Hansen (DEN)

23 January 2015; 19:00	Croatia	28–21	Bosnia and Herzegovina	Duhail Handball Sports Hall, Doha; Attendance: 800; Referees: Reveret, Pichon (FRA)
23 January 2015; 19:00	Karačić 6	(17–8)	Toromanović 7	Duhail Handball Sports Hall, Doha; Attendance: 800; Referees: Reveret, Pichon (FRA)
23 January 2015; 19:00	3× (yellow card) 4× (suspension)	Report	2× (yellow card) 6× (suspension) 1× (red card)	Duhail Handball Sports Hall, Doha; Attendance: 800; Referees: Reveret, Pichon (FRA)

=== Group C ===
Team	Pld	W	D	L	GF	GA	GD	Pts
France	5	4	1	0	143	128	+15	9
Sweden	5	3	1	1	137	109	+28	7
Iceland	5	2	1	2	127	135	−8	5
Egypt	5	2	1	2	135	125	+10	5
Czech Republic	5	2	0	3	145	138	+7	4
Algeria	5	0	0	5	109	161	−52	0

16 January 2015; 19:00	Algeria	20−34	Egypt	Ali Bin Hamad Al Attiya Arena, Al Rayyan; Attendance: 5,500; Referees: López, Ramírez (ESP)
16 January 2015; 19:00	Kaabeche 6	(9−17)	Issa 5	Ali Bin Hamad Al Attiya Arena, Al Rayyan; Attendance: 5,500; Referees: López, Ramírez (ESP)
16 January 2015; 19:00	3× (yellow card) 6× (suspension)	Report	3× (yellow card) 7× (suspension)	Ali Bin Hamad Al Attiya Arena, Al Rayyan; Attendance: 5,500; Referees: López, Ramírez (ESP)

16 January 2015; 21:00	France	30−27	Czech Republic	Duhail Handball Sports Hall, Doha; Attendance: 1,800; Referees: Gjeding, Hansen (DEN)
16 January 2015; 21:00	Guigou, Karabatić 7	(16−9)	Horák 8	Duhail Handball Sports Hall, Doha; Attendance: 1,800; Referees: Gjeding, Hansen (DEN)
16 January 2015; 21:00	2× (yellow card) 6× (suspension)	Report	3× (yellow card) 10× (suspension) 1× (red card)	Duhail Handball Sports Hall, Doha; Attendance: 1,800; Referees: Gjeding, Hansen (DEN)

16 January 2015; 21:00	Sweden	24−16	Iceland	Ali Bin Hamad Al Attiya Arena, Al Rayyan; Attendance: 1,000; Referees: Menezes, Pinto (BRA)
16 January 2015; 21:00	Ekberg 7	(12−7)	Atlason 5	Ali Bin Hamad Al Attiya Arena, Al Rayyan; Attendance: 1,000; Referees: Menezes, Pinto (BRA)
16 January 2015; 21:00	3× (yellow card) 7× (suspension)	Report	3× (yellow card) 6× (suspension)	Ali Bin Hamad Al Attiya Arena, Al Rayyan; Attendance: 1,000; Referees: Menezes, Pinto (BRA)

18 January 2015; 19:00	Iceland	32–24	Algeria	Ali Bin Hamad Al Attiya Arena, Al Rayyan; Attendance: 2,000; Referees: Milošević, Gubica (CRO)
18 January 2015; 19:00	Sigurðsson 8	(12–13)	Berkous 5	Ali Bin Hamad Al Attiya Arena, Al Rayyan; Attendance: 2,000; Referees: Milošević, Gubica (CRO)
18 January 2015; 19:00	3× (yellow card) 6× (suspension) 1× (red card)	Report	4× (yellow card) 3× (suspension)	Ali Bin Hamad Al Attiya Arena, Al Rayyan; Attendance: 2,000; Referees: Milošević, Gubica (CRO)

18 January 2015; 21:00	Czech Republic	22–36	Sweden	Ali Bin Hamad Al Attiya Arena, Al Rayyan; Attendance: 1,000; Referees: Geipel, Helbig (GER)
18 January 2015; 21:00	Babák, Sobol 5	(10–19)	Andersson 10	Ali Bin Hamad Al Attiya Arena, Al Rayyan; Attendance: 1,000; Referees: Geipel, Helbig (GER)
18 January 2015; 21:00	3× (yellow card) 6× (suspension) 1× (red card)	Report	3× (yellow card) 5× (suspension)	Ali Bin Hamad Al Attiya Arena, Al Rayyan; Attendance: 1,000; Referees: Geipel, Helbig (GER)

18 January 2015; 21:00	Egypt	24–28	France	Duhail Handball Sports Hall, Doha; Attendance: 4,500; Referees: Krstić, Ljubič (SLO)
18 January 2015; 21:00	Amer 5	(11–14)	Karabatić 6	Duhail Handball Sports Hall, Doha; Attendance: 4,500; Referees: Krstić, Ljubič (SLO)
18 January 2015; 21:00	3× (yellow card) 10× (suspension)	Report	3× (yellow card) 7× (suspension)	Duhail Handball Sports Hall, Doha; Attendance: 4,500; Referees: Krstić, Ljubič (SLO)

20 January 2015; 19:00	Czech Republic	24–27	Egypt	Ali Bin Hamad Al Attiya Arena, Al Rayyan; Attendance: 6,500; Referees: Al-Suwaidi, Bamutref (QAT)
20 January 2015; 19:00	Hrstka 5	(10–13)	El-Ahmar 5	Ali Bin Hamad Al Attiya Arena, Al Rayyan; Attendance: 6,500; Referees: Al-Suwaidi, Bamutref (QAT)
20 January 2015; 19:00	3× (yellow card) 4× (suspension)	Report	3× (yellow card) 9× (suspension)	Ali Bin Hamad Al Attiya Arena, Al Rayyan; Attendance: 6,500; Referees: Al-Suwaidi, Bamutref (QAT)

20 January 2015; 21:00	France	26–26	Iceland	Duhail Handball Sports Hall, Doha; Attendance: 2,500; Referees: Santos, Fonseca (POR)
20 January 2015; 21:00	Karabatić 6	(12–14)	Hallgrímsson, Pálmarsson 5	Duhail Handball Sports Hall, Doha; Attendance: 2,500; Referees: Santos, Fonseca (POR)
20 January 2015; 21:00	3× (yellow card) 5× (suspension) 1× (red card)	Report	4× (yellow card) 7× (suspension)	Duhail Handball Sports Hall, Doha; Attendance: 2,500; Referees: Santos, Fonseca (POR)

20 January 2015; 21:00	Sweden	27–19	Algeria	Ali Bin Hamad Al Attiya Arena, Al Rayyan; Attendance: 1,000; Referees: Nachevski, Nikolov (MKD)
20 January 2015; 21:00	Källman 6	(15–6)	Daoud 6	Ali Bin Hamad Al Attiya Arena, Al Rayyan; Attendance: 1,000; Referees: Nachevski, Nikolov (MKD)
20 January 2015; 21:00	3× (yellow card) 6× (suspension) 1× (red card)	Report	3× (yellow card) 4× (suspension)	Ali Bin Hamad Al Attiya Arena, Al Rayyan; Attendance: 1,000; Referees: Nachevski, Nikolov (MKD)

22 January 2015; 19:00	Sweden	25–25	Egypt	Ali Bin Hamad Al Attiya Arena, Al Rayyan; Attendance: 7,000; Referees: Milošević, Gubica (CRO)
22 January 2015; 19:00	Ekberg 10	(10–10)	El-Ahmar 9	Ali Bin Hamad Al Attiya Arena, Al Rayyan; Attendance: 7,000; Referees: Milošević, Gubica (CRO)
22 January 2015; 19:00	3× (yellow card) 6× (suspension)	Report	3× (yellow card) 7× (suspension) 1× (red card)	Ali Bin Hamad Al Attiya Arena, Al Rayyan; Attendance: 7,000; Referees: Milošević, Gubica (CRO)

22 January 2015; 21:00	Iceland	25–36	Czech Republic	Ali Bin Hamad Al Attiya Arena, Al Rayyan; Attendance: 500; Referees: Lee, Koo (KOR)
22 January 2015; 21:00	Guðjónsson 5	(11–21)	Jícha 11	Ali Bin Hamad Al Attiya Arena, Al Rayyan; Attendance: 500; Referees: Lee, Koo (KOR)
22 January 2015; 21:00	2× (yellow card) 7× (suspension)	Report	3× (yellow card) 6× (suspension)	Ali Bin Hamad Al Attiya Arena, Al Rayyan; Attendance: 500; Referees: Lee, Koo (KOR)

22 January 2015; 21:00	Algeria	26–32	France	Duhail Handball Sports Hall, Doha; Attendance: 2,000; Referees: Nikolić, Stojković (SRB)
22 January 2015; 21:00	Berkous 11	(12–19)	Guigou 7	Duhail Handball Sports Hall, Doha; Attendance: 2,000; Referees: Nikolić, Stojković (SRB)
22 January 2015; 21:00	3× (yellow card) 9× (suspension)	Report	3× (yellow card) 5× (suspension)	Duhail Handball Sports Hall, Doha; Attendance: 2,000; Referees: Nikolić, Stojković (SRB)

24 January 2015; 19:00	Egypt	25–28	Iceland	Ali Bin Hamad Al Attiya Arena, Al Rayyan; Attendance: 5,500; Referees: Nikolić, Stojković (SRB)
24 January 2015; 19:00	Issa, Radwan 5	(10–15)	Sigurðsson 13	Ali Bin Hamad Al Attiya Arena, Al Rayyan; Attendance: 5,500; Referees: Nikolić, Stojković (SRB)
24 January 2015; 19:00	3× (yellow card) 4× (suspension)	Report	2× (yellow card) 7× (suspension)	Ali Bin Hamad Al Attiya Arena, Al Rayyan; Attendance: 5,500; Referees: Nikolić, Stojković (SRB)

24 January 2015; 21:00	Algeria	20–36	Czech Republic	Duhail Handball Sports Hall, Doha; Attendance: 500; Referees: Hizaki, Ikebuchi (JPN)
24 January 2015; 21:00	Daoud, Hamoud 5	(10–21)	Jícha 7	Duhail Handball Sports Hall, Doha; Attendance: 500; Referees: Hizaki, Ikebuchi (JPN)
24 January 2015; 21:00	3× (yellow card) 1× (suspension)	Report	3× (yellow card) 3× (suspension)	Duhail Handball Sports Hall, Doha; Attendance: 500; Referees: Hizaki, Ikebuchi (JPN)

24 January 2015; 21:00	France	27–25	Sweden	Ali Bin Hamad Al Attiya Arena, Al Rayyan; Attendance: 3,000; Referees: López, Ramírez (ESP)
24 January 2015; 21:00	Joli 9	(11–12)	Källman 8	Ali Bin Hamad Al Attiya Arena, Al Rayyan; Attendance: 3,000; Referees: López, Ramírez (ESP)
24 January 2015; 21:00	4× (yellow card) 2× (suspension) 1× (red card)	Report	3× (yellow card) 4× (suspension)	Ali Bin Hamad Al Attiya Arena, Al Rayyan; Attendance: 3,000; Referees: López, Ramírez (ESP)

=== Group D ===
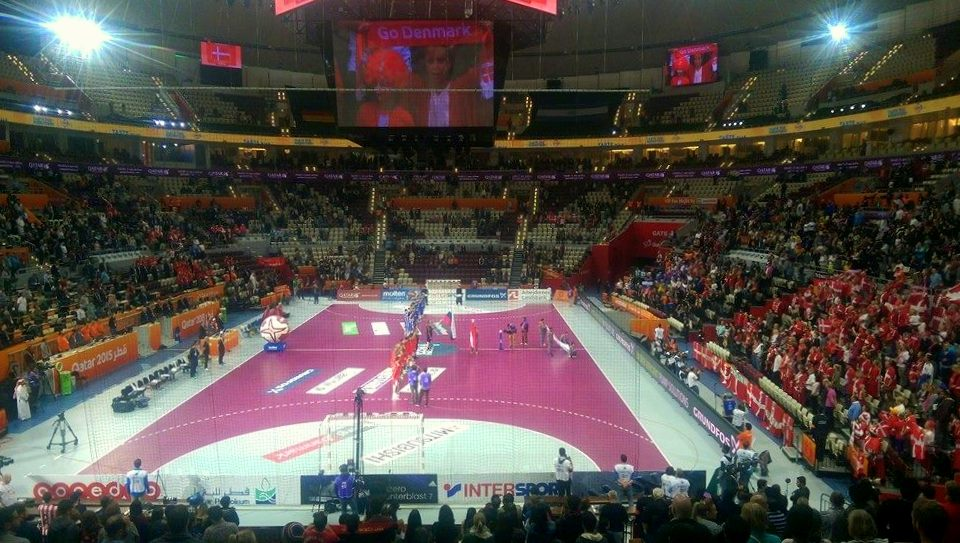
Russia vs Denmark at the Lusail Sports Arena.

Team	Pld	W	D	L	GF	GA	GD	Pts
Germany	5	4	1	0	150	124	+26	9
Denmark	5	3	2	0	154	127	+27	8
Poland	5	3	0	2	135	121	+14	6
Argentina	5	2	1	2	132	123	+9	5
Russia	5	1	0	4	133	131	+2	2
Saudi Arabia	5	0	0	5	87	165	−78	0

16 January 2015; 15:00	Russia	27–17	Saudi Arabia	Duhail Handball Sports Hall, Doha; Attendance: 500; Referees: Hizaki, Ikebuchi (JPN)
16 January 2015; 15:00	Dereven, Zhitnikov 4	(17–9)	Al-Abbas, Al-Hannabi 4	Duhail Handball Sports Hall, Doha; Attendance: 500; Referees: Hizaki, Ikebuchi (JPN)
16 January 2015; 15:00	2× (yellow card) 6× (suspension) 1× (red card)	Report	4× (yellow card) 9× (suspension)	Duhail Handball Sports Hall, Doha; Attendance: 500; Referees: Hizaki, Ikebuchi (JPN)

16 January 2015; 19:00	Poland	26−29	Germany	Lusail Sports Arena, Lusail; Attendance: 3,500; Referees: Nachevski, Nikolov (MKD)
16 January 2015; 19:00	Lijewski 7	(13−17)	Weinhold 9	Lusail Sports Arena, Lusail; Attendance: 3,500; Referees: Nachevski, Nikolov (MKD)
16 January 2015; 19:00	4× (yellow card) 5× (suspension)	Report	3× (yellow card) 6× (suspension)	Lusail Sports Arena, Lusail; Attendance: 3,500; Referees: Nachevski, Nikolov (MKD)

16 January 2015; 21:00	Denmark	24−24	Argentina	Lusail Sports Arena, Lusail; Attendance: 1,000; Referees: Krstić, Ljubič (SLO)
16 January 2015; 21:00	Eggert 5	(13−8)	Pizarro 8	Lusail Sports Arena, Lusail; Attendance: 1,000; Referees: Krstić, Ljubič (SLO)
16 January 2015; 21:00	3× (yellow card) 7× (suspension)	Report	3× (yellow card) 7× (suspension) 1× (red card)	Lusail Sports Arena, Lusail; Attendance: 1,000; Referees: Krstić, Ljubič (SLO)

18 January 2015; 19:00	Argentina	23–24	Poland	Duhail Handball Sports Hall, Doha; Attendance: 3,000; Referees: Novotný, Horáček (CZE)
18 January 2015; 19:00	three players 5	(12–11)	three players 5	Duhail Handball Sports Hall, Doha; Attendance: 3,000; Referees: Novotný, Horáček (CZE)
18 January 2015; 19:00	3× (yellow card) 6× (suspension) 1× (red card)	Report	4× (yellow card) 7× (suspension)	Duhail Handball Sports Hall, Doha; Attendance: 3,000; Referees: Novotný, Horáček (CZE)

18 January 2015; 19:00	Germany	27–26	Russia	Lusail Sports Arena, Lusail; Attendance: 600; Referees: Kliko, Johansson (SWE)
18 January 2015; 19:00	Gensheimer 9	(9–13)	Igropulo 6	Lusail Sports Arena, Lusail; Attendance: 600; Referees: Kliko, Johansson (SWE)
18 January 2015; 19:00	3× (yellow card) 7× (suspension)	Report	4× (yellow card) 8× (suspension)	Lusail Sports Arena, Lusail; Attendance: 600; Referees: Kliko, Johansson (SWE)

18 January 2015; 21:00	Saudi Arabia	18–38	Denmark	Lusail Sports Arena, Lusail; Attendance: 600; Referees: Rashed, El-Sayed (EGY)
18 January 2015; 21:00	Al-Janabi, Moj. Al-Salem 4	(6–20)	H. Toft Hansen 8	Lusail Sports Arena, Lusail; Attendance: 600; Referees: Rashed, El-Sayed (EGY)
18 January 2015; 21:00	2× (yellow card) 4× (suspension)	Report	3× (yellow card) 3× (suspension)	Lusail Sports Arena, Lusail; Attendance: 600; Referees: Rashed, El-Sayed (EGY)

20 January 2015; 19:00	Poland	26–25	Russia	Lusail Sports Arena, Lusail; Attendance: 1,000; Referees: Krstić, Ljubič (SLO)
20 January 2015; 19:00	Rojewski 6	(12–13)	Shishkarev 7	Lusail Sports Arena, Lusail; Attendance: 1,000; Referees: Krstić, Ljubič (SLO)
20 January 2015; 19:00	3× (yellow card) 5× (suspension)	Report	2× (yellow card) 5× (suspension)	Lusail Sports Arena, Lusail; Attendance: 1,000; Referees: Krstić, Ljubič (SLO)

20 January 2015; 19:00	Argentina	32–20	Saudi Arabia	Duhail Handball Sports Hall, Doha; Attendance: 1,000; Referees: Krichen, Makhlouf (TUN)
20 January 2015; 19:00	Pizarro 7	(13–11)	Al-Janabi 5	Duhail Handball Sports Hall, Doha; Attendance: 1,000; Referees: Krichen, Makhlouf (TUN)
20 January 2015; 19:00	4× (yellow card) 6× (suspension)	Report	3× (yellow card) 12× (suspension) 2× (red card)	Duhail Handball Sports Hall, Doha; Attendance: 1,000; Referees: Krichen, Makhlouf (TUN)

20 January 2015; 21:00	Denmark	30–30	Germany	Lusail Sports Arena, Lusail; Attendance: 2,000; Referees: López, Ramírez (ESP)
20 January 2015; 21:00	Christiansen, Hansen 6	(16–16)	Weinhold 8	Lusail Sports Arena, Lusail; Attendance: 2,000; Referees: López, Ramírez (ESP)
20 January 2015; 21:00	3× (yellow card) 3× (suspension)	Report	4× (yellow card) 5× (suspension)	Lusail Sports Arena, Lusail; Attendance: 2,000; Referees: López, Ramírez (ESP)

22 January 2015; 19:00	Poland	32–13	Saudi Arabia	Duhail Handball Sports Hall, Doha; Attendance: 800; Referees: Kliko, Johansson (SWE)
22 January 2015; 19:00	Syprzak 10	(17–6)	Al-Abdulali 4	Duhail Handball Sports Hall, Doha; Attendance: 800; Referees: Kliko, Johansson (SWE)
22 January 2015; 19:00	3× (yellow card) 3× (suspension)	Report	3× (yellow card) 4× (suspension) 1× (red card)	Duhail Handball Sports Hall, Doha; Attendance: 800; Referees: Kliko, Johansson (SWE)

22 January 2015; 19:00	Germany	28–23	Argentina	Lusail Sports Arena, Lusail; Attendance: 5,500; Referees: Gatelis, Mažeika (LTU)
22 January 2015; 19:00	Groetzki 7	(13–14)	Fernández 6	Lusail Sports Arena, Lusail; Attendance: 5,500; Referees: Gatelis, Mažeika (LTU)
22 January 2015; 19:00	3× (yellow card) 6× (suspension)	Report	4× (yellow card) 6× (suspension)	Lusail Sports Arena, Lusail; Attendance: 5,500; Referees: Gatelis, Mažeika (LTU)

22 January 2015; 21:00	Russia	28–31	Denmark	Lusail Sports Arena, Lusail; Attendance: 10,500; Referees: Nachevski, Nikolov (MKD)
22 January 2015; 21:00	Shishkarev 8	(8–16)	Lauge 9	Lusail Sports Arena, Lusail; Attendance: 10,500; Referees: Nachevski, Nikolov (MKD)
22 January 2015; 21:00	3× (yellow card) 1× (suspension)	Report	3× (yellow card) 2× (suspension)	Lusail Sports Arena, Lusail; Attendance: 10,500; Referees: Nachevski, Nikolov (MKD)

24 January 2015; 19:00	Saudi Arabia	19–36	Germany	Lusail Sports Arena, Lusail; Attendance: 3,500; Referees: Santos, Fonseca (POR)
24 January 2015; 19:00	three players 3	(8–18)	Musche, Sellin 11	Lusail Sports Arena, Lusail; Attendance: 3,500; Referees: Santos, Fonseca (POR)
24 January 2015; 19:00	3× (yellow card) 6× (suspension)	Report	3× (yellow card) 5× (suspension)	Lusail Sports Arena, Lusail; Attendance: 3,500; Referees: Santos, Fonseca (POR)

24 January 2015; 19:00	Russia	27–30	Argentina	Duhail Handball Sports Hall, Doha; Attendance: 500; Referees: Al-Suwaidi, Bamutref (QAT)
24 January 2015; 19:00	Shishkarev 7	(16–17)	Pizarro 9	Duhail Handball Sports Hall, Doha; Attendance: 500; Referees: Al-Suwaidi, Bamutref (QAT)
24 January 2015; 19:00	3× (yellow card) 8× (suspension) 1× (red card)	Report	4× (yellow card) 4× (suspension) 1× (red card)	Duhail Handball Sports Hall, Doha; Attendance: 500; Referees: Al-Suwaidi, Bamutref (QAT)

24 January 2015; 21:00	Denmark	31–27	Poland	Lusail Sports Arena, Lusail; Attendance: 6,000; Referees: Milošević, Gubica (CRO)
24 January 2015; 21:00	Lindberg 6	(16–12)	Rojewski 5	Lusail Sports Arena, Lusail; Attendance: 6,000; Referees: Milošević, Gubica (CRO)
24 January 2015; 21:00	3× (yellow card) 5× (suspension)	Report	4× (yellow card) 3× (suspension)	Lusail Sports Arena, Lusail; Attendance: 6,000; Referees: Milošević, Gubica (CRO)

== Knockout stage ==
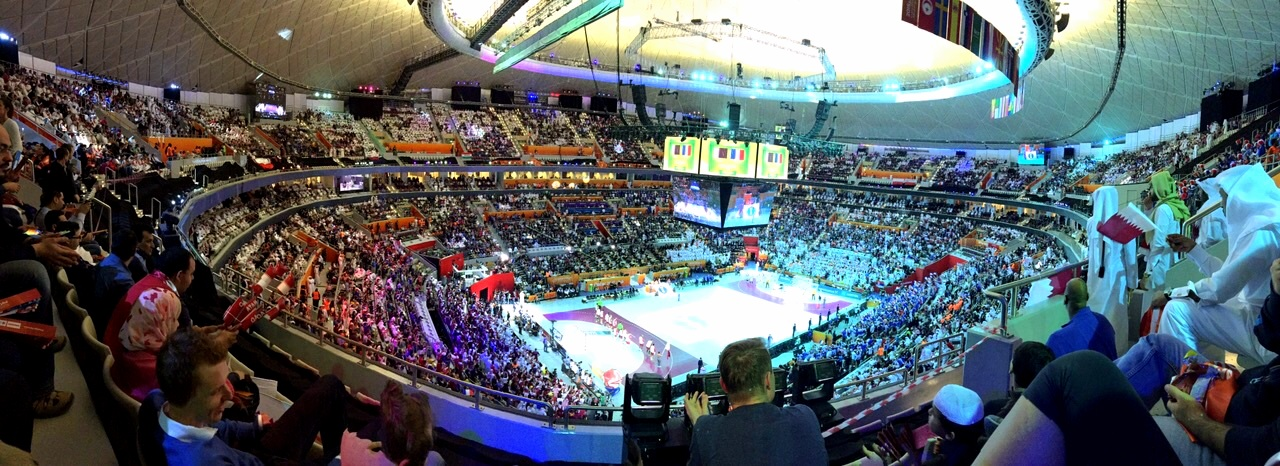
The final (Qatar vs France) at the Lusail Sports Arena.

=== Championship ===
Round of 16
B1	Croatia	26
A4	Brazil	25
D3	Poland	24
C2	Sweden	20
B3	Austria	27
A2	Qatar	29
D1	Germany	23
C4	Egypt	16
C3	Iceland	25
D2	Denmark	30
A1	Spain	28
B4	Tunisia	20
A3	Slovenia	30
B2	North Macedonia	28
C1	France	33
D4	Argentina	20

Quarterfinals
B1	Croatia	22
D3	Poland	24
A2	Qatar	26
D1	Germany	24
D2	Denmark	24
A1	Spain	25
A3	Slovenia	23
C1	France	32

Semifinals
D3	Poland	29
A2	Qatar	31
A1	Spain	22
C1	France	26

Final
A2	Qatar	22
C1	France	25
Third place
D3	Poland	29
A1	Spain	28

==== Round of 16 ====
25 January 2015; 18:30	Austria	27–29	Qatar	Lusail Sports Arena, Lusail; Attendance: 12,200; Referees: Milošević, Gubica (CRO)
25 January 2015; 18:30	Weber 8	(14–13)	Marković 8	Lusail Sports Arena, Lusail; Attendance: 12,200; Referees: Milošević, Gubica (CRO)
25 January 2015; 18:30	4× (yellow card) 7× (suspension)	Report	2× (yellow card) 4× (suspension)	Lusail Sports Arena, Lusail; Attendance: 12,200; Referees: Milošević, Gubica (CRO)

25 January 2015; 18:30	Slovenia	30–28	North Macedonia	Ali Bin Hamad Al Attiya Arena, Al Rayyan; Attendance: 800; Referees: Gatelis, Mažeika (LTU)
25 January 2015; 18:30	Gajić 9	(16–15)	Georgievski, K. Lazarov 7	Ali Bin Hamad Al Attiya Arena, Al Rayyan; Attendance: 800; Referees: Gatelis, Mažeika (LTU)
25 January 2015; 18:30	4× (yellow card) 9× (suspension)	Report	3× (yellow card) 4× (suspension) 1× (red card)	Ali Bin Hamad Al Attiya Arena, Al Rayyan; Attendance: 800; Referees: Gatelis, Mažeika (LTU)

25 January 2015; 21:00	Spain	28–20	Tunisia	Lusail Sports Arena, Lusail; Attendance: 5,500; Referees: Nachevski, Nikolov (MKD)
25 January 2015; 21:00	Ugalde 6	(18–9)	Boughanmi 5	Lusail Sports Arena, Lusail; Attendance: 5,500; Referees: Nachevski, Nikolov (MKD)
25 January 2015; 21:00	3× (yellow card) 5× (suspension)	Report	3× (yellow card) 3× (suspension)	Lusail Sports Arena, Lusail; Attendance: 5,500; Referees: Nachevski, Nikolov (MKD)

25 January 2015; 21:00	Croatia	26–25	Brazil	Ali Bin Hamad Al Attiya Arena, Al Rayyan; Attendance: 800; Referees: Al-Suwaidi, Bamutref (QAT)
25 January 2015; 21:00	Kopljar 5	(13–15)	Silva 5	Ali Bin Hamad Al Attiya Arena, Al Rayyan; Attendance: 800; Referees: Al-Suwaidi, Bamutref (QAT)
25 January 2015; 21:00	2× (yellow card) 1× (suspension)	Report	3× (yellow card) 5× (suspension)	Ali Bin Hamad Al Attiya Arena, Al Rayyan; Attendance: 800; Referees: Al-Suwaidi, Bamutref (QAT)

26 January 2015; 18:30	Germany	23–16	Egypt	Lusail Sports Arena, Lusail; Attendance: 12,500; Referees: Novotný, Horáček (CZE)
26 January 2015; 18:30	Gensheimer 6	(12–8)	El-Ahmar, Issa 4	Lusail Sports Arena, Lusail; Attendance: 12,500; Referees: Novotný, Horáček (CZE)
26 January 2015; 18:30	3× (yellow card) 7× (suspension)	Report	3× (yellow card) 5× (suspension) 1× (red card)	Lusail Sports Arena, Lusail; Attendance: 12,500; Referees: Novotný, Horáček (CZE)

26 January 2015; 18:30	Poland	24–20	Sweden	Ali Bin Hamad Al Attiya Arena, Al Rayyan; Attendance: 1,500; Referees: Krstić, Ljubič (SLO)
26 January 2015; 18:30	B. Jurecki, M. Jurecki 5	(10–11)	Petersen 5	Ali Bin Hamad Al Attiya Arena, Al Rayyan; Attendance: 1,500; Referees: Krstić, Ljubič (SLO)
26 January 2015; 18:30	2× (yellow card) 3× (suspension)	Report	3× (yellow card) 6× (suspension)	Ali Bin Hamad Al Attiya Arena, Al Rayyan; Attendance: 1,500; Referees: Krstić, Ljubič (SLO)

26 January 2015; 21:00	Iceland	25–30	Denmark	Lusail Sports Arena, Lusail; Attendance: 3,000; Referees: Reveret, Pichon (FRA)
26 January 2015; 21:00	Petersson 7	(10–16)	Lauge Schmidt 6	Lusail Sports Arena, Lusail; Attendance: 3,000; Referees: Reveret, Pichon (FRA)
26 January 2015; 21:00	4× (yellow card) 2× (suspension)	Report	3× (yellow card) 5× (suspension)	Lusail Sports Arena, Lusail; Attendance: 3,000; Referees: Reveret, Pichon (FRA)

26 January 2015; 21:00	France	33–20	Argentina	Ali Bin Hamad Al Attiya Arena, Al Rayyan; Attendance: 1,500; Referees: Gjeding, Hansen (DEN)
26 January 2015; 21:00	Porte 6	(16–6)	Carou 4	Ali Bin Hamad Al Attiya Arena, Al Rayyan; Attendance: 1,500; Referees: Gjeding, Hansen (DEN)
26 January 2015; 21:00	2× (yellow card) 4× (suspension)	Report	2× (yellow card) 1× (suspension)	Ali Bin Hamad Al Attiya Arena, Al Rayyan; Attendance: 1,500; Referees: Gjeding, Hansen (DEN)

==== Quarterfinals ====
28 January 2015; 18:30	Croatia	22–24	Poland	Ali Bin Hamad Al Attiya Arena, Al Rayyan; Attendance: 1,500; Referees: Gjeding, Hansen (DEN)
28 January 2015; 18:30	Duvnjak, Kopljar 5	(10–12)	Jurkiewicz 6	Ali Bin Hamad Al Attiya Arena, Al Rayyan; Attendance: 1,500; Referees: Gjeding, Hansen (DEN)
28 January 2015; 18:30	3× (yellow card) 3× (suspension)	Report	4× (yellow card) 3× (suspension)	Ali Bin Hamad Al Attiya Arena, Al Rayyan; Attendance: 1,500; Referees: Gjeding, Hansen (DEN)

28 January 2015; 18:30	Qatar	26–24	Germany	Lusail Sports Arena, Lusail; Attendance: 15,000; Referees: Nachevski, Nikolov (MKD)
28 January 2015; 18:30	Capote 8	(18–14)	Gensheimer 5	Lusail Sports Arena, Lusail; Attendance: 15,000; Referees: Nachevski, Nikolov (MKD)
28 January 2015; 18:30	3× (yellow card) 2× (suspension)	Report	4× (yellow card) 3× (suspension)	Lusail Sports Arena, Lusail; Attendance: 15,000; Referees: Nachevski, Nikolov (MKD)

28 January 2015; 21:00	Slovenia	23–32	France	Ali Bin Hamad Al Attiya Arena, Al Rayyan; Attendance: 2,500; Referees: Novotný, Horáček (CZE)
28 January 2015; 21:00	L. Žvižej 6	(10–18)	Narcisse 6	Ali Bin Hamad Al Attiya Arena, Al Rayyan; Attendance: 2,500; Referees: Novotný, Horáček (CZE)
28 January 2015; 21:00	4× (yellow card) 5× (suspension)	Report	2× (yellow card) 2× (suspension)	Ali Bin Hamad Al Attiya Arena, Al Rayyan; Attendance: 2,500; Referees: Novotný, Horáček (CZE)

28 January 2015; 21:00	Denmark	24–25	Spain	Lusail Sports Arena, Lusail; Attendance: 9,000; Referees: Geipel, Helbig (GER)
28 January 2015; 21:00	Eggert, Hansen 6	(11–11)	Rivera Folch 10	Lusail Sports Arena, Lusail; Attendance: 9,000; Referees: Geipel, Helbig (GER)
28 January 2015; 21:00	4× (yellow card) 3× (suspension)	Report	3× (yellow card) 3× (suspension)	Lusail Sports Arena, Lusail; Attendance: 9,000; Referees: Geipel, Helbig (GER)

==== Semifinals ====
30 January 2015; 18:30	Poland	29–31	Qatar	Lusail Sports Arena, Lusail; Attendance: 15,000; Referees: Nikolić, Stojković (SRB)
30 January 2015; 18:30	Jurecki 9	(13–16)	Capote, Mallash 6	Lusail Sports Arena, Lusail; Attendance: 15,000; Referees: Nikolić, Stojković (SRB)
30 January 2015; 18:30	3× (yellow card) 5× (suspension)	Report	3× (yellow card) 2× (suspension)	Lusail Sports Arena, Lusail; Attendance: 15,000; Referees: Nikolić, Stojković (SRB)

30 January 2015; 21:00	Spain	22–26	France	Lusail Sports Arena, Lusail; Attendance: 9,000; Referees: Krstić, Ljubič (SLO)
30 January 2015; 21:00	Cañellas, Ugalde 5	(14–18)	Guigou 5	Lusail Sports Arena, Lusail; Attendance: 9,000; Referees: Krstić, Ljubič (SLO)
30 January 2015; 21:00	3× (yellow card) 3× (suspension)	Report	3× (yellow card) 3× (suspension)	Lusail Sports Arena, Lusail; Attendance: 9,000; Referees: Krstić, Ljubič (SLO)

==== Bronze medal game ====
1 February 2015
16:30
Poland
29–28 (ET)
Spain
Lusail Sports Arena, Lusail
Attendance: 9,400
Referees: Gjeding, Hansen (DEN)
Szyba 8
(13–13)
Tomás 7
3× (yellow card) 4× (suspension)
Report
2× (yellow card) 1× (suspension)

FT: 24–24 ET: 5–4

==== Final ====
1 February 2015; 19:15	Qatar	22–25	France	Lusail Sports Arena, Lusail; Attendance: 15,000; Referees: Novotný, Horáček (CZE)
1 February 2015; 19:15	Marković 7	(11–14)	Karabatić 5	Lusail Sports Arena, Lusail; Attendance: 15,000; Referees: Novotný, Horáček (CZE)
1 February 2015; 19:15	3× (yellow card) 4× (suspension)	Report	4× (yellow card) 2× (suspension)	Lusail Sports Arena, Lusail; Attendance: 15,000; Referees: Novotný, Horáček (CZE)

=== 5–8th place playoffs ===
Semifinals
30 January
Croatia	28
Germany	23
30 January
Denmark	36
Slovenia	33

Fifth place
31 January
Croatia	24
Denmark	28
Seventh place
31 January
Germany	30
Slovenia	27

==== 5–8th place semifinals ====
30 January 2015; 16:00	Croatia	28–23	Germany	Ali Bin Hamad Al Attiya Arena, Al Rayyan; Attendance: 800; Referees: López, Ramírez (ESP)
30 January 2015; 16:00	Štrlek 8	(13–11)	Gensheimer, Schöngarth 6	Ali Bin Hamad Al Attiya Arena, Al Rayyan; Attendance: 800; Referees: López, Ramírez (ESP)
30 January 2015; 16:00	3× (yellow card) 2× (suspension)	Report	4× (yellow card) 2× (suspension)	Ali Bin Hamad Al Attiya Arena, Al Rayyan; Attendance: 800; Referees: López, Ramírez (ESP)

30 January 2015; 18:30	Denmark	36–33	Slovenia	Ali Bin Hamad Al Attiya Arena, Al Rayyan; Attendance: 500; Referees: Al-Suwaidi, Bamutref (QAT)
30 January 2015; 18:30	Hansen 13	(19–15)	Gajić 12	Ali Bin Hamad Al Attiya Arena, Al Rayyan; Attendance: 500; Referees: Al-Suwaidi, Bamutref (QAT)
30 January 2015; 18:30	3× (yellow card) 4× (suspension)	Report	2× (yellow card) 5× (suspension) 2× (red card)	Ali Bin Hamad Al Attiya Arena, Al Rayyan; Attendance: 500; Referees: Al-Suwaidi, Bamutref (QAT)

==== Seventh place game ====
31 January 2015; 16:30	Germany	30–27	Slovenia	Lusail Sports Arena, Lusail; Attendance: 1,000; Referees: Novotný, Horáček (CZE)
31 January 2015; 16:30	Gensheimer 13	(16–14)	Natek 9	Lusail Sports Arena, Lusail; Attendance: 1,000; Referees: Novotný, Horáček (CZE)
31 January 2015; 16:30	3× (yellow card) 3× (suspension)	Report	3× (yellow card) 3× (suspension) 1× (red card)	Lusail Sports Arena, Lusail; Attendance: 1,000; Referees: Novotný, Horáček (CZE)

==== Fifth place game ====
31 January 2015; 19:15	Croatia	24–28	Denmark	Lusail Sports Arena, Lusail; Attendance: 3,000; Referees: López, Ramírez (ESP)
31 January 2015; 19:15	three players 4	(11–15)	Hansen 8	Lusail Sports Arena, Lusail; Attendance: 3,000; Referees: López, Ramírez (ESP)
31 January 2015; 19:15	3× (yellow card) 3× (suspension)	Report	3× (yellow card) 3× (suspension)	Lusail Sports Arena, Lusail; Attendance: 3,000; Referees: López, Ramírez (ESP)

== President’s Cup ==
=== 17–20th place playoffs ===
Semifinals
26 January
Belarus	37
Bosnia and Herzegovina	29
26 January
Czech Republic	32
Russia	30

17th place
27 January
Belarus	31
Czech Republic (pen.)	32
19th place
27 January
Bosnia and Herzegovina	28
Russia	42

=== 21–24th place playoffs ===
Semifinals
26 January
Chile	31
Iran	32
26 January
Algeria	25
Saudi Arabia	27

21st place
27 January
Iran	26
Saudi Arabia	22
23rd place
27 January
Chile (pen.)	27(3)
Algeria	27(1)

==== Placement semifinals ====
26 January 2015; 13:00	Chile	31–32	Iran	Duhail Handball Sports Hall, Doha; Attendance: 100; Referees: Hizaki, Ikebuchi (JPN)
26 January 2015; 13:00	R. Salinas 18	(15–17)	three players 5	Duhail Handball Sports Hall, Doha; Attendance: 100; Referees: Hizaki, Ikebuchi (JPN)
26 January 2015; 13:00	2× (yellow card) 2× (suspension)	Report	3× (yellow card) 4× (suspension) 1× (red card)	Duhail Handball Sports Hall, Doha; Attendance: 100; Referees: Hizaki, Ikebuchi (JPN)

26 January 2015; 15:00	Algeria	25–27	Saudi Arabia	Duhail Handball Sports Hall, Doha; Attendance: 100; Referees: Kliko, Johansson (SWE)
26 January 2015; 15:00	Hamoud 9	(14–12)	Moj. Al-Salem 5	Duhail Handball Sports Hall, Doha; Attendance: 100; Referees: Kliko, Johansson (SWE)
26 January 2015; 15:00	2× (yellow card) 6× (suspension) 1× (red card)	Report	3× (yellow card) 7× (suspension)	Duhail Handball Sports Hall, Doha; Attendance: 100; Referees: Kliko, Johansson (SWE)

26 January 2015; 17:00	Belarus	37–29	Bosnia and Herzegovina	Duhail Handball Sports Hall, Doha; Attendance: 300; Referees: Menezes, Pinto (BRA)
26 January 2015; 17:00	S. Rutenka 9	(20–16)	Burić 6	Duhail Handball Sports Hall, Doha; Attendance: 300; Referees: Menezes, Pinto (BRA)
26 January 2015; 17:00	3× (yellow card) 6× (suspension)	Report	3× (yellow card) 4× (suspension)	Duhail Handball Sports Hall, Doha; Attendance: 300; Referees: Menezes, Pinto (BRA)

26 January 2015; 19:00	Czech Republic	32–30	Russia	Duhail Handball Sports Hall, Doha; Attendance: 300; Referees: Krichen, Makhlouf (TUN)
26 January 2015; 19:00	Zdráhala 8	(16–15)	Dereven 8	Duhail Handball Sports Hall, Doha; Attendance: 300; Referees: Krichen, Makhlouf (TUN)
26 January 2015; 19:00	4× (yellow card) 6× (suspension) 1× (red card)	Report	1× (yellow card) 6× (suspension)	Duhail Handball Sports Hall, Doha; Attendance: 300; Referees: Krichen, Makhlouf (TUN)

==== 23rd place game ====
27 January 2015
13:00
Chile
30–28
Algeria
Duhail Handball Sports Hall, Doha
Attendance: 100
Referees: Santos, Fonseca (POR)
R. Salinas 11
(10–16)
Hamoud 12
4× (yellow card) 4× (suspension)
Report
2× (yellow card) 7× (suspension)

FT: 27–27 Pen: 3–1

==== 21st place game ====
27 January 2015; 15:00	Iran	26–22	Saudi Arabia	Duhail Handball Sports Hall, Doha; Attendance: 150; Referees: Menezes, Pinto (BRA)
27 January 2015; 15:00	A. Esteki 6	(15–10)	Al-Abdulali 6	Duhail Handball Sports Hall, Doha; Attendance: 150; Referees: Menezes, Pinto (BRA)
27 January 2015; 15:00	2× (yellow card) 5× (suspension) 1× (red card)	Report	3× (yellow card) 6× (suspension)	Duhail Handball Sports Hall, Doha; Attendance: 150; Referees: Menezes, Pinto (BRA)

==== 19th place game ====
27 January 2015; 17:00	Bosnia and Herzegovina	28–42	Russia	Duhail Handball Sports Hall, Doha; Attendance: 200; Referees: Hizaki, Ikebuchi (JPN)
27 January 2015; 17:00	Malinović 6	(16–20)	Kovalev 6	Duhail Handball Sports Hall, Doha; Attendance: 200; Referees: Hizaki, Ikebuchi (JPN)
27 January 2015; 17:00	3× (yellow card) 6× (suspension)	Report	2× (yellow card) 6× (suspension)	Duhail Handball Sports Hall, Doha; Attendance: 200; Referees: Hizaki, Ikebuchi (JPN)

==== 17th place game ====
27 January 2015
19:00
Belarus
31–32
Czech Republic
Duhail Handball Sports Hall, Doha
Attendance: 300
Referees: Rased, El-Sayed (EGY)
S. Rutenka 12
(13–14)
four players 6
3× (yellow card) 5× (suspension)
Report
3× (yellow card) 3× (suspension)

FT: 28–28 Pen: 3–4

== Statistics ==
=== Top goalscorers ===
Rank	Name	Team	Goals	Shots	%
1	Dragan Gajić	Slovenia	71	93	76%
2	Žarko Marković	Qatar	67	127	53%
3	Uwe Gensheimer	Germany	54	72	75%
4	Rodrigo Salinas	Chile	52	92	57%
5	Rafael Capote	Qatar	48	78	62%
6	Valero Rivera Folch	Spain	47	58	81%
7	Kiril Lazarov	North Macedonia	45	78	58%
8	Siarhei Rutenka	Belarus	43	75	57%
9	Robert Weber	Austria	42	61	69%
10	Ivan Čupić	Croatia	41	53	77%

Source: IHF.info

=== Top goalkeepers ===
Rank	Name	Team	%	Saves	Shots
1	Carsten Lichtlein	Germany	38%	57	152
2	Filip Ivić	Croatia	37%	44	119
2	Thierry Omeyer	France	37%	105	283
2	Gonzalo Pérez de Vargas	Spain	37%	97	259
5	Mattias Andersson	Sweden	36%	53	147
5	Danijel Šarić	Qatar	36%	75	206
5	Petr Štochl	Czech Republic	36%	75	210
8	Jannick Green	Denmark	35%	47	135
8	Silvio Heinevetter	Germany	35%	67	193
8	Nikola Marinovic	Austria	35%	52	150

Source: IHF.info

== Final ranking ==
Rank	Team
1st place, gold medalist(s)	France
2nd place, silver medalist(s)	Qatar
3rd place, bronze medalist(s)	Poland
4	Spain
5	Denmark
6	Croatia
7	Germany
8	Slovenia
9	North Macedonia
10	Sweden
11	Iceland
12	Argentina
13	Austria
14	Egypt
15	Tunisia
16	Brazil
17	Czech Republic
18	Belarus
19	Russia
20	Bosnia and Herzegovina
21	Iran
22	Saudi Arabia
23	Chile
24	Algeria

Qualified for the 2016 Summer Olympics
Qualified for the 2016 Summer Olympics thru continental events
Qualified for the Olympic Qualification Tournament

2015 World Men's Handball Championship champions

France
5th title

Team roster

William Accambray, Igor Anić, Xavier Barachet, Cyril Dumoulin, Jérôme Fernandez, Mathieu Grébille, Michaël Guigou, Samuel Honrubia, Guillaume Joli, Luka Karabatic, Nikola Karabatić, Kentin Mahé, Daniel Narcisse, Alix Nyokas, Thierry Omeyer, Valentin Porte, Cédric Sorhaindo
Head coach: Claude Onesta

=== All-Star Team ===
All-Star Team of the tournament:

- Goalkeeper: Thierry Omeyer (FRA)
- Right wing: Dragan Gajić (SVN)
- Right back: Žarko Marković (QAT)
- Centre back: Nikola Karabatić (FRA)
- Left back: Rafael Capote (QAT)
- Left wing: Valero Rivera Folch (ESP)
- Pivot: Bartosz Jurecki (POL)

=== Other awards ===
- Most Valuable Player: Thierry Omeyer (FRA)

The final rankings were used in the 2016 Summer Olympics qualification process. France, as World Champion, qualified for the Olympics. The next 6 teams earned a place in the Olympic Qualification Tournaments. Qatar and Germany, however, won their continental tournaments (qualifying them directly for the Olympics) and thus their spots in the Olympic Qualification Tournaments went to Slovenia and North Macedonia.

== Controversies ==
=== Withdrawal of teams ===
As mentioned under qualifications, Australia lost its spot in the tournament due to an IHF decision, being replaced by Germany, who had not originally qualified. Further, Bahrain and United Arab Emirates withdrew.

=== Qatar player naturalisation ===
A large number of players in the Qatar team had been naturalised in the years leading up to the championship. According to IHF rules, to gain eligibility for a new national team, a player cannot have played for another nation for three years in an official match. This allowed several foreign-born players, including Spanish-born Borja Vidal, Goran Stojanović and Jovo Damjanović from Montenegro, and Bertrand Roiné who previously played for France, to play for the Qatar team at the championship. According to the Frankfurter Allgemeine, only four of the 17 players in the squad were native to Qatar.

Head of the Qatar Handball Federation, Ahmed Mohammed Abdulrab Al Shaabi, acknowledged the policy in a statement in June 2013, saying "We're a small nation with limited human resources, so we had to bring players from outside in the past." He also announced an end to the policy at the time, adding however that they "[might] make an exception only in the case of an experienced goalkeeper." In January 2014, Danish sports agent Mads Winther said he had met with "contacts involved with Qatar" regarding the possibility of naturalising Danish players.

The practice was criticised by Austrian goalkeeper after his team's loss to Qatar in the round of 16, saying "It [felt] like playing against a world selection team" and "I think it is not the sense of a world championship." At a press conference during the championship, Qatar head coach Valero Rivera declined to comment on the matter. Spanish player Joan Cañellas did not think it was an issue, saying "If they can do it, why not."

After the controversial semi-final against Poland, and reaching the final as a result, the practice was even more criticised, with players such as Danijel Šarić having now represented four different national teams.

=== Paid fans ===
Qatar flew in about 60 Spanish fans to cheer for Qatar during the championship.

=== Refereeing ===
During the first 12 matches of the tournament, 143 two-minute suspensions were awarded by the referees, a figure that came under strong criticism from teams, who had not been informed of the IHF Referee Committee's instructions to referees commanding them to keep a strict disciplinary line.

The referees were widely accused of being one-sided in favour of the hosts. Especially at the matches against Austria, Germany and Poland. After the final whistle, the Polish players showed their discontent by ironically applauding the three referees.

== See also ==
- 2015 IHF Emerging Nations Championship
