= Duhail Handball Sports Hall =

Indoor sports arena in Doha, Qatar

Coordinates: 25.3711°N 51.4706°E

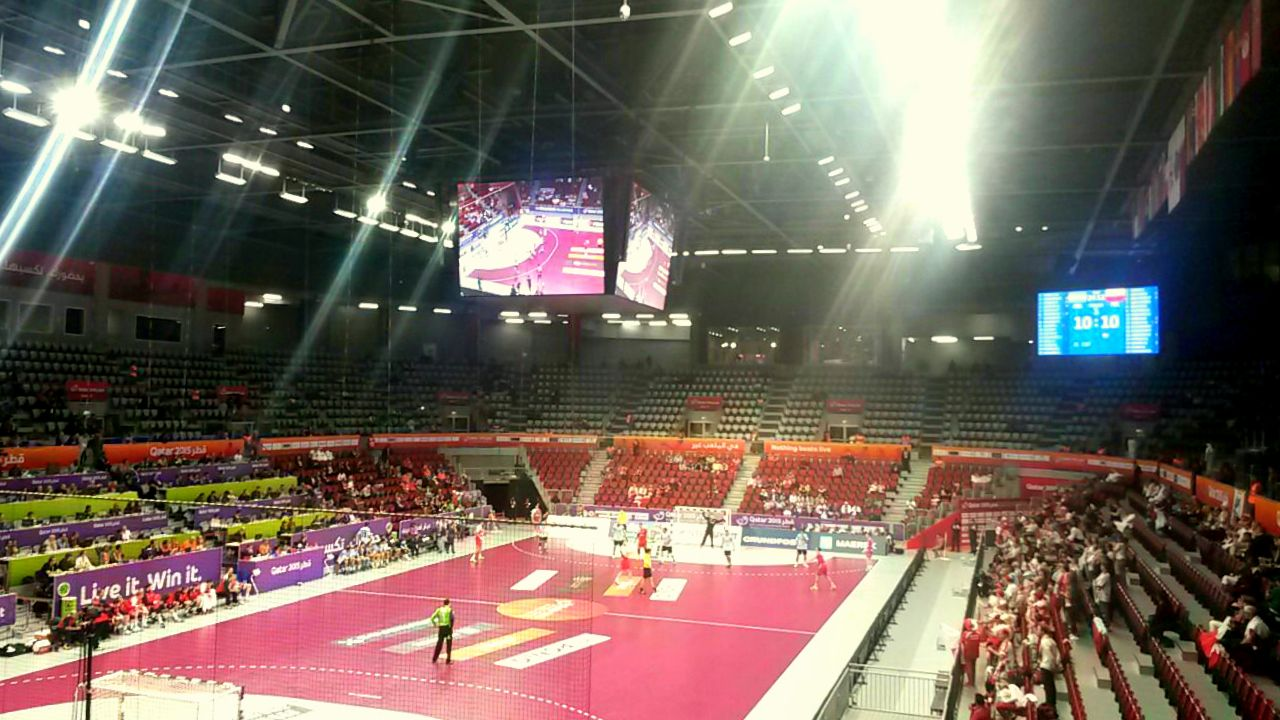
- Interactive map of Duhail Handball Sports Hall
- Location: Doha, Qatar
- Owner: Qatar Olympic Committee
- Capacity: 5,500

Duhail Handball Sports Hall is an indoor sports arena based in the suburb of Duhail in Doha, Qatar. It was built to host matches of the 2015 World Men's Handball Championship. It was also the venue for all matches of the 2015 IHF Super Globe. It will host matches for the 2027 FIBA Basketball World Cup.

Accommodating a capacity of up to 5,500 spectators, the arena serves as the headquarters of the Qatar Handball Association as of 2015.

== 2022 FIFA World Cup ==
The Duhail Handball Sports Hall was announced to be hosting the Senegal national football team during the 2022 FIFA World Cup.
