= 2011–12 Croatian Premier League (handball) =

2011-12 Premijer Liga
- League: Croatian Premier Handball League
- Sport: Handball
- Games: 48
- Teams: 13 (regular season); 6 (championship)
- Total attendance: 10,000

Regular season
- Season champions: Siscia Sisak
- Top scorer: Hrvoje Batinović (230 goals)

Championship playoffs
- Finals champions: Croatia Osiguranje Zagreb
- Runners-up: NEXE Našice

Seasons
- ← 2010–11 2012–13 →

The 2011–12 Premijer Liga season is the twenty-one since its establishment.

== Teams ==
Locations of teams participating in the 2011-12 season

	Teams	Team	City	Venue (Capacity)
Regular season	14			
Regular season	14	MRK Arena Jadrograd	Pula	Mate Parlov Sport Centre
Regular season	14	RK Bjelovar	Bjelovar	ŠSD Bjelovar
Regular season	14	RK Buzet	Buzet	SD u Buzetu
Regular season	14	RK Dubrava	Zagreb	ŠD Dubrava
Regular season	14	HRK Gorica	Velika Gorica	Dvorana srednjih škola
Regular season	14	RK Karlovac	Karlovac	SŠD Mladost
Regular season	14	RK Kaštela Adriachem	Kaštel Gomilica	Gradska dvorana Kaštela
Regular season	14	RK Međimurje	Čakovec	Dvorana Građevinske škole
Regular season	14	RK Poreč	Poreč	Dvorana Veli Jože
Regular season	14	RK Siscia	Sisak	SD Brezovica
Regular season	14	RK Spačva	Vinkovci	Sportska dvorana Bartol Kašić
Regular season	14	RK Split	Split	Spaladium-Arena (12,500)
Regular season	14	Varteks di Caprio	Varaždin	Varaždin Arena
Regular season	14	RK Zamet	Rijeka	Centar Zamet (2,350)
Champions Round	2			
Champions Round	2	RK Zagreb	Zagreb	Arena Zagreb (15,200)
Champions Round	2	RK Nexe	Našice	Sportska dvorana kralja Tomislava (2,500)

== Regular season ==
=== Standings ===
	Team	Pld	W	D	L	GF	GA	Diff	Pts
1	RK Siscia Sisak	24	16	4	4	736	651	+85	36
2	RK Porec	24	16	3	5	699	634	+65	35
3	HRK Karlovac	24	14	4	6	685	637	+48	32
4	RK Split	24	12	5	7	664	613	+51	29
5	RK Buzet	24	13	2	9	651	614	+37	28
6	RK Spacva Vinkovci	24	13	2	9	721	725	-4	28
7	RK Zamet Rijeka	24	12	3	9	723	654	+69	27
8	RK Bjelovar	24	12	2	10	655	615	+40	26
9	Dubrava Zagreb	24	11	2	11	679	674	+5	24
10	RK Kastela Adriachem	24	10	3	11	735	705	+30	23
11	HRK Gorica	24	6	2	16	686	760	-74	14
12	RK Varteks	24	4	1	19	692	803	-111	9
13	RK MKA*IPC	24	0	1	23	630	871	-241	1

Qualified for Championship Round
Relegation Round

Pld - Played; W - Won; L - Lost; PF - Points for; PA - Points against; Diff - Difference; Pts - Points.

== Championship Round ==
=== Standings ===
	Team	Pld	W	D	L	GF	GA	Diff	Pts
1	RK Zagreb	10	10	0	0	334	257	+77	20
2	RK Nexe	10	4	2	4	303	283	+20	10
3	HRK Siscia Sisak	10	4	1	5	264	286	-22	9
4	RK Split	10	4	0	6	286	306	-20	8
5	RK Porec	10	2	3	5	238	267	-29	7
6	HRK Karlovac	10	1	4	5	279	305	-26	6

Champion

Pld - Played; W - Won; L - Lost; PF - Points for; PA - Points against; Diff - Difference; Pts - Points.

== 5th Place Round ==
=== Standings ===
	Team	Pld	W	D	L	GF	GA	Diff	Pts
1	RK Zamet Rijeka	6	4	0	2	198	181	+17	13
2	RK Bjelovar	6	4	0	2	175	171	+4	13
3	RK Buzet	6	2	0	4	144	167	-23	12
4	RK Spacva Vinkovci	6	2	0	4	180	178	+2	10

European Cup

Pld - Played; W - Won; L - Lost; PF - Points for; PA - Points against; Diff - Difference; Pts - Points.

== Relegation Round ==
=== Standings ===
	Team	Pld	W	D	L	GF	GA	Diff	Pts
1	Dubrava Zagreb	8	5	2	1	286	258	+28	25
2	RK Kastela Adriachem	8	5	0	3	295	249	+46	22
3	HRK Gorica	8	4	2	2	273	250	+23	19
4	RK Varteks	8	4	0	4	265	239	+26	14
5	RK MKA*IPC	8	0	0	8	201	324	-123	0

Relegated

Pld - Played; W - Won; L - Lost; PF - Points for; PA - Points against; Diff - Difference; Pts - Points.

== 2011-12 winning team ==
=== RK Croatia Osiguranje Zagreb ===
- GK: Ivan Pešić, Marin Šego, Matej Asanin, Filip Ivić
- LB: Tonči Valčić, Jakov Gojun, Goran Bogunović
- CB: Ivano Balić, David Špiler, Ante Kaleb, Josip Valčić
- RB: Luka Stepančić, Luka Šebetić
- RW: Zlatko Horvat, Jerko Matulić Filip Čelić
- LW: Ljubo Vukić, Manuel Štrlek, Lovro Šprem
- LP: Michal Kopčo, Marino Marić, Ilija Brozović
- Head coach: Slavko Goluža

Source: eurohandball.com

== See also ==
- 2011–12 SEHA League
