= 2010–11 Croatian Premier League (handball) =

2010–11 Premijer Liga
- League: Croatian Premier Handball League
- Sport: Handball
- Games: 30
- Teams: 16

Regular season
- Season champions: Croatia Osiguranje Zagreb

Seasons
- ← 2009–10 2011–12 →

The 2010–11 Dukat Premijer Liga season is the twentieth season since its establishment and third in the Premier league format.

== Teams ==
Locations of teams participating in the 2008-09 season

Team	City	Venue (Capacity)
MRK Arena Jadrograd	Pula	Mate Parlov Sport Centre (2,312)
RK Bjelovar	Bjelovar	Školsko-sportska dvorana Bjelovar (1,500)
RK Buzet	Buzet	SD Buzet (300)
RK Croatia Osiguranje	Zagreb	Kutija Šibica (1,500), Arena Zagreb (15, 000)
RK Dubrava	Zagreb	ŠD Dubrava (1,260)
HRK Gorica	Velika Gorica	Dvorana srednjih škola (500)
HRK Karlovac	Karlovac	SŠD Mladost (2,750)
RK Medveščak NFD	Zagreb	Kutija Šibica (1,500)
RK Međimurje	Čakovec	Dvorana Građevinske škole (1,150)
RK Moslavina Kutina	Kutina	ŠC Kutina (1,300)
RK NEXE	Našice	Sportska dvorana kralja Tomislava (2,500)
RK Poreč	Poreč	SRC Veli Jože (1,000)
RK Siscia	Sisak	SD Brezovica (1,500)
RK Split	Split	Arena Gripe (3,000)
RK Varteks Di Caprio	Varaždin	Varaždin Arena (5,200)
RK Zamet	Rijeka	Centar Zamet (2,350)

== League table ==
Pos.	Team	Pld.	W	D	L	Goal+	Goal-	+/-	Pts.
1.	Croatia Osiguranje Zagreb	30	30	0	0	1055	713	+342	60
2.	NEXE Našice	30	27	1	2	1018	825	+193	55
3.	Bjelovar	30	19	1	10	848	840	+8	39
4.	Siscia Sisak	30	16	2	12	844	781	+63	34
5.	Dubrava Zagreb	30	16	0	14	831	826	+5	32
6.	Gorica Velika Gorica	30	14	3	13	913	877	+36	31
7.	Poreč	30	14	3	13	846	869	-23	31
8.	Karlovac	30	14	0	16	801	831	-30	28
9.	Zamet Rijeka	30	12	3	15	906	937	-31	27
10.	Međimurje Čakovec	30	12	3	15	854	891	-37	27
11.	Varteks Di Caprio Varaždin	30	12	2	16	868	962	-94	26
12.	Buzet	30	10	5	15	778	793	-15	25
13.	Split	30	11	1	18	866	895	-29	23
14.	Arena Jadrograd Pula	30	10	0	20	863	977	-114	20
15.	Medveščak NFD Zagreb	30	6	3	21	796	866	-70	15
16.	Moslavina Kutina	30	3	1	26	770	974	-204	7

Qualified for the 2011-12 EHF Champions League	Qualified for the 2011-12 EHF Cup	Qualified for the 2011-12 EHF Cup Winners' Cup	Qualified for the 2011-12 EHF Challenge Cup	Relegated to 2011-12 1.HRL

== 2010-11 winning team ==
=== RK Croatia Osiguranje Zagreb ===
- GK: Marin Šego, Ivan Pešić, Gorazd Škof, Filip Ivić
- LB: Tonči Valčić, Jakov Gojun, Goran Bogunović
- CB: Ivano Balić, David Špiler
- RB: Luka Stepančić, Luka Šebetić
- RW: Zlatko Horvat, Adnan Jaskić, Jerko Matulić Filip Čelić
- LW: Ljubo Vukić, Manuel Štrlek
- LP: Michal Kopčo, Gyula Gál, Marino Marić, Ilija Brozović
- Head coach: Ivica Obrvan

Source: eurohandball.com

== Sources ==
- HRS
- Sport.net.hr
- Rk-zamet.hr
- Rijeka.hr
