= 2012–13 Croatian Premier Handball League (handball) =

2012–13 Premijer Liga
- League: Croatian Premier Handball League
- Sport: Handball
- Games: 52
- Teams: 13 (regular season); 6 (championship)
- Total attendance: 25,000

Regular season
- Season champions: Siscia Sisak
- Top scorer: Luka Cindrić (243 goals)

Championship playoffs
- Finals champions: Croatia Osiguranje Zagreb
- Runners-up: NEXE Našice

Seasons
- ← 2011–12 2013–14 →

The 2012–13 Premijer Liga season is the twenty-second since its establishment.

== Teams ==
Locations of teams participating in the 2011-12 season

	Teams	Team	City	Venue (Capacity)
Regular season	14			
Regular season	14	RK Bjelovar	Bjelovar	ŠSD Bjelovar
Regular season	14	RK Buzet	Buzet	SD u Buzetu
Regular season	14	RK Dubrava	Zagreb	ŠD Dubrava
Regular season	14	HRK Gorica	Velika Gorica	Dvorana srednjih škola
Regular season	14	RK Karlovačka Banka	Karlovac	SŠD Mladost
Regular season	14	RK Marina Kaštela	Kaštel Gomilica	Gradska dvorana Kaštela
Regular season	14	RK Medveščak NFD Zagreb	Zagreb	SD Šutinska Vrela
Regular season	14	RK Poreč	Poreč	Dvorana Veli Jože
Regular season	14	RK Siscia	Sisak	SD Brezovica
Regular season	14	RK Spačva	Vinkovci	Sportska dvorana Bartol Kašić
Regular season	14	RK Split	Split	Spaladium Arena (12,500)
Regular season	14	Varteks di Caprio	Varaždin	Varaždin Arena
Regular season	14	RK Vidovec Bios	Vidovec	ŠSD Vidovec
Regular season	14	RK Zamet	Rijeka	Centar Zamet (2,350)
Champions Round	2			
Champions Round	2	RK Zagreb	Zagreb	Arena Zagreb (15,200)
Champions Round	2	RK Nexe	Našice	Sportska dvorana kralja Tomislava (2,500)

== Regular season ==
=== Standings ===
Pos.	Team	Pld.	W	D	L	Goal+	Goal-	Pts.	Qualification or relegation
1.	Siscia Sisak	26	22	1	3	853	703	44	Championship play-offs
2.	Dubrava Zagreb	26	18	1	7	817	766	37	Championship play-offs
3.	Karlovačka Banka	26	18	0	8	802	693	36	Championship play-offs
4.	Poreč	26	16	2	8	793	685	34	Championship play-offs
5.	Zamet Rijeka	26	16	1	9	756	670	32	Mid-table play-offs
6.	Vidovec Bios	26	15	2	9	781	725	32	Mid-table play-offs
7.	Bjelovar	26	14	2	10	779	714	30	Mid-table play-offs
8.	Buzet	26	12	2	12	756	733	26	Mid-table play-offs
9.	Marina Kaštela Gomilica	26	10	3	13	731	737	23	Relegation play-offs
10.	Medveščak NFD Zagreb	26	9	2	15	733	782	20	Relegation play-offs
11.	Gorica	26	9	0	17	760	772	18	Relegation play-offs
12.	Spačva Vinkovci	26	8	1	17	719	790	16	Relegation play-offs
13.	Koteks Split	26	6	0	20	731	852	11	Relegation play-offs
14.	Varteks Di Caprio Varaždin	26	0	1	25	551	940	0	Relegation play-offs

Source: rukometstat.com

== Championship Playoffs ==
=== Standings ===
	Team	Pld	W	D	L	GF	GA	Diff	Pts
1	Croatia Osiguranje Zagreb	10	10	0	0	352	247	+105	20
2	Nexe Našice	10	6	1	3	315	300	+15	13
3	Poreč	10	5	1	4	303	297	6	11
4	Karlovačka Banka	10	4	0	6	276	289	-13	8
5	Dubrava Zagreb	10	3	0	7	269	309	-40	6
6	Siscia Sisak	10	1	0	9	272	345	-73	2

Qualified for the 2013-14 EHF Champions League	Qualified for the 2013–14 EHF Cup

Pld - Played; W - Won; L - Lost; PF - Points for; PA - Points against; Diff - Difference; Pts - Points.

== Mid-Table Playoffs ==
Pos.	club	with results from Regular season							results from Mid-table playoffs					
Pos.	club	Pld	W	D	L	GF	GA	Pts	Pld	W	D	L	GF	GA
1.	Zamet Rijeka	12	7	0	5	345	329	14	6	3	0	3	171	158
2.	Bjelovar	12	6	2	4	362	357	14	6	3	1	2	170	181
3.	Buzet	12	4	2	6	343	349	10	6	2	1	3	168	169
4.	Vidovec BIOS	12	4	2	6	339	354	10	6	2	2	2	177	178

Pld - Played; W - Won; L - Lost; PF - Points for; PA - Points against; Diff - Difference; Pts - Points.

=== Relegation play-offs ===
Pos.	club	with results from Regular season							results from Relegation playoffs					
Pos.	club	Pld	W	D	L	GF	GA	Pts	Pld	W	D	L	GF	GA
1.	Marina Kaštela Kaštel Gomilica	20	15	0	5	629	524	30	10	8	0	2	324	271
2.	Spačva Vinkovci	20	13	0	7	596	536	26	10	8	0	2	302	251
3.	Medveščak NFD Zagreb	20	12	2	6	608	552	26	10	6	1	3	320	275
4.	Gorica Velika Gorica	20	10	1	9	622	559	21	10	4	1	5	308	279
5.	Split	20	6	3	11	589	608	15	10	1	3	6	286	310
6.	Varteks Di Caprio Varaždin	20	0	2	18	438	703	2	10	0	1	9	210	364

Relegated

Pld - Played; W - Won; L - Lost; PF - Points for; PA - Points against; Diff - Difference; Pts - Points.

== Final table ==
Pos.	club	Pld	W	D	L	GF	GA
Championship Playoffs
1.	Croatia Osiguranje Zagreb	10	10	0	0	352	247
2.	NEXE Našice	10	6	1	3	315	300
3.	Poreč	36	31	3	12	1006	986
4.	Karlovac	36	22	0	14	1078	982
5.	Dubrava Zagreb	36	21	1	14	1076	1075
6.	Siscia Sisak	36	23	1	12	1025	1048
Mid-Table Playoffs
7.	Zamet Rijeka	32	19	1	12	927	828
8.	Bjelovar	32	17	3	12	949	895
9.	Buzet	32	14	3	15	923	902
10.	Vidovec BIOS	32	17	4	11	958	903
Relegation Playoffs
11.	Marina Kaštela Kaštel Gomilica	36	18	3	16	1059	1009
12.	Spačva Vinkovci	36	14	1	19	1022	1041
13.	Medveščak NFD Zagreb	36	15	3	18	1053	1060
14.	Gorica Velika Gorica	36	13	1	22	1068	1051
15.	Split	36	7	3	26	1017	1161
16.	Varteks Di Caprio Varaždin	36	0	2	34	761	1304

Qualified for the 2013-14 SEHA League

Pld - Played; W - Won; L - Lost; PF - Points for; PA - Points against; Diff - Difference; Pts - Points.

== 2012-13 winning team ==
=== RK Croatia Osiguranje Zagreb ===
- GK: Ivan Stevanović, Filip Ivić
- LB: Tonči Valčić, Stipe Mandalinić, Marko Matić, Domagoj Sršen
- CB: Josip Valčić, David Špiler, Luka Ćosić
- RB: Luka Stepančić, Luka Šebetić
- RW: Zlatko Horvat, Jerko Matulić, Bruno Butorac, Lovro Šprem
- LW: Hrvoje Batinović, Lovro Mihić
- LP: Marino Marić, Ilija Brozović
- Head coach: Boris Dvoršek

Source: rukometstat.com

== Sources ==
- HRS
- Sport.net.hr
- Rk-zamet.hr
- Rijeka.hr
