= Jin Watanabe (handballer) =

Japanese handball player (born 1990)

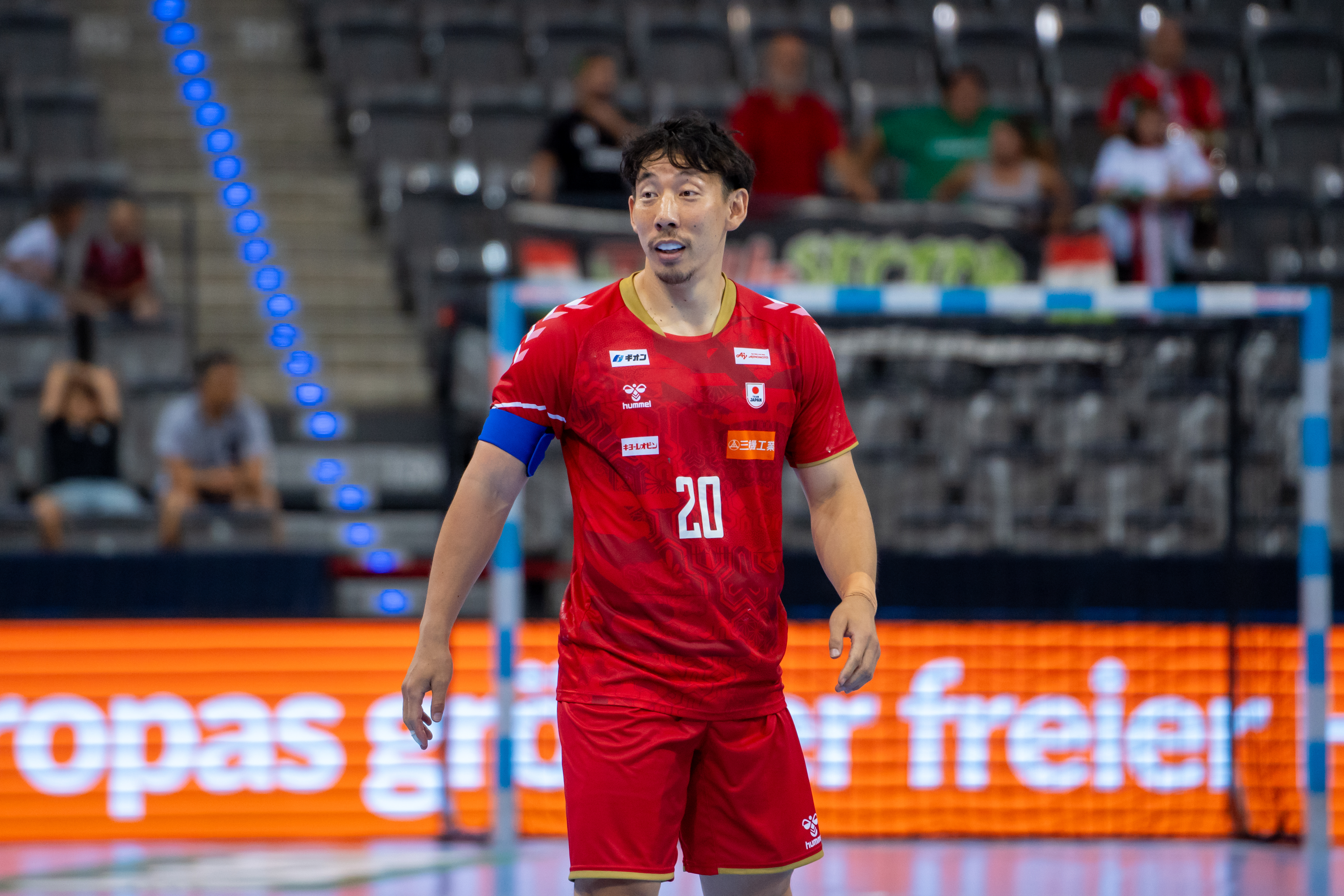
- Watanabe (right) in 2016

Personal information
- Nationality: Japanese
- Born: 17 January 1990 (age 36)
- Height: 1.83 m (6 ft 0 in)

Sport
- Sport: Handball
- Position: Right back
- Current club: Toyota Auto Body
National team
Years	Team	Apps	(Gls)
–	Japan	67	(226)
Medal record
Men's handball
Representing Japan
Asian Games
Bronze medal – third place	2026 Aichi–Nagoya	Team
Asian Championship
Silver medal – second place	2024 Bahrain
Bronze medal – third place	2020 Kuwait

Jin Watanabe (渡部 仁, Watanabe Jin; born 17 January 1990) is a Japanese handball player for Toyota Auto Body and the Japanese national team.

He participated at the 2017 and 2019 World Men's Handball Championship.

== Individual awards ==
All-Star Team

- All-Star Right Back of the Asian Championship: 2026
