= Boris Dvoršek =

Croatian handball coach (born 1970)

Personal information
- Nationality: Croatian
- Born: 9 November 1970 (age 55) Zagreb, SFR Yugoslavia

Sport
- Sport: Handball
- Current club: Croatia (assistant)

Teams managed
- Years: Team
- 1989–1997: Badel 1862 Zagreb (youth)
- 1994–1997: Croatia U-18 (men)
- 1997–2001: Croatia U-21 (men)
- 1998–2000: RK Karlovac
- 2000–2001: Medveščak Osiguranje Zagreb
- 2004–2007: ŽRK Trešnjevka Zagreb
- 2006–2007: Croatia U-18 (women)
- 2006–2008: Croatia U-21 (women)
- 2007–2009: Medveščak Zagreb
- 2009–2011: ŽRK Trešnjevka Zagreb
- 2010–2012: Croatia (women) (assistant)
- 2011–2013: CO Zagreb II
- 2013: CO Zagreb (assistant)
- 2013–2014: CO Zagreb
- 2014–2015: Borac Banja Luka
- 2016–2017: ASV Eppan HB Löwen
- 2017–2018: PIF
- 2018–2020: SSV Bozen Loacker
- 2020–2021: Riihimäen Cocks
- 2021: Alba Fehérvár KC
- 2023–: Croatia (assistant)

Boris Dvoršek (born 9 November 1970) is a Croatian handball coach who is currently assistant coach in Croatian national handball team.

== Honours ==
Zagreb (Youth)

- Croatian Handball U-18 Championship (3): 1994, 1995, 1996
- Croatian Handball U-21 Championship (4): 1993, 1994, 1995, 2003

ŽRK Trešnjevka Zagreb

- 2.HRL - West (1): 2004-05

Zagreb

- Dukat Premier League (2): 2012-13, 2013-14
- Croatian Cup (2): 2013, 2014
- SEHA League (1): 2012-13

Borac Banja Luka

- Handball Cup of Bosnia and Herzegovina (1): 2015

SSV Bozen Loacker-Volksbank

- Serie A (1): 2019
- Handball Cup of Italy (1): 2019
