= 2019 World Men's Handball Championship =

Denmark 2019 - 26th IHF tournament

Verdensmesterskabet i håndbold for mænd 2019 (in Danish) Handball-Weltmeisterschaft der Männer 2019 (in German)

Tournament details
- Host countries: Denmark; Germany
- Venues: 6 (in 6 host cities)
- Dates: 10–27 January
- Teams: 24 (from 5 confederations)

Final positions
- Champions: Denmark (1st title)
- Runners-up: Norway
- Third place: France
- Fourth place: Germany

Tournament statistics
- Matches played: 96
- Goals scored: 5,239 (54.57 per match)
- Attendance: 906,283 (9,440 per match)
- Top scorers: (Denmark) Mikkel Hansen (72 goals)

Awards
- Best player: (Denmark) Mikkel Hansen

The 2019 IHF World Men's Handball Championship was the 26th event hosted by the International Handball Federation and held in Denmark and Germany from 10 to 27 January 2019. It was the first IHF World Men's Handball Championship to include more than one host country. It was also the first time a unified Korean team participated.

Denmark, in a clean sweep, won their first title by defeating Norway 31–22 in the final. This was Norway's second final in a row and the first final since 1995 between two nations who had not won before. France captured the bronze medal after a 26–25 win over Germany.

The tournament set a new spectator record with 906,283, helped by the fact that there were two home teams. Biggest number of spectator at single events was 19,250 at Germany's matches in the main round.

== Bidding process ==
Denmark/Germany presented a bid and were up against competitors from Poland and Slovakia/Hungary. The International Handball Federation announced on 28 October 2013 that Denmark/Germany would be awarded the 2019 World Men's Handball Championship.

== Format ==
This edition saw a format change back to the one used in 2011. The 24 teams were split into four groups, in which the first three teams qualified for the main round. The bottom three teams of each group played the Presidents' Cup to determine the positions from 13 to 24. In the main round, the 12 teams were split into two groups. Their points from the preliminary round against the other qualified team were carried over, and the best two placed teams in each main round group qualified for the semifinals, while the third- and fourth ranked teams played placement matches. From the semifinals on, a knockout system was used.

== Venues ==
Following is a list of all venues and host cities which was used. All venues have a capacity of more than 10,000 spectators. The final was held in Jyske Bank Boxen in Herning, Denmark.

Copenhagen	Herning	Berlin
Royal Arena	Jyske Bank Boxen	Mercedes-Benz Arena
Capacity: 16,000	Capacity: 15,000	Capacity: 17,000
2019 World Men's Handball Championship is located in Denmark		2019 World Men's Handball Championship is located in Germany
Cologne	Munich	Hamburg
Lanxess Arena	Olympiahalle	Barclaycard Arena
Capacity: 20,000	Capacity: 15,500	Capacity: 16,000

== Qualification ==
Competition	Dates	Vacancies	Qualified
Host nations	28 October 2013	2	Denmark; Germany
2017 World Championship	11–29 January 2017	1	France
2018 European Men's Handball Championship	12–28 January 2018	1	Spain
2018 African Men's Handball Championship	17–27 January 2018	3	Angola; Egypt; Tunisia
2018 Asian Men's Handball Championship	18–28 January 2018	4	Bahrain; Qatar; Saudi Arabia; ~~South Korea~~
European qualification	25 October 2017 – 14 June 2018	9	Austria; Croatia; Hungary; Iceland; North Macedonia; Norway; Russia; Serbia; Sweden
2018 Pan American Men's Handball Championship	16–24 June 2018	3	Argentina; Brazil; Chile
Wildcard	9 May 2018; 10 October 2018	2	Japan; Korea

=== Qualified teams ===
Country	Qualified as	Qualified on	Previous appearances^{1}
Denmark	Host	28 October 2013	22 (1938, 1954, 1958, 1961, 1964, 1967, 1970, 1974, 1978, 1982, 1986, 1993, 1995, 1999, 2003, 2005, 2007, 2009, 2011, 2013, 2015, 2017)
Germany	Host	28 October 2013	24 (**1938**, 1954, 1958, 1961, 1964, 1967, 1970, 1974, **1978**, 1982, 1986, 1990^{3}, 1993, 1995, 1999, 2001, 2003, 2005, **2007**, 2009, 2011, 2013, 2015, 2017)
France	World champion	29 January 2017	21 (1954, 1958, 1961, 1964, 1967, 1970, 1978, 1990, 1993, **1995**, 1997, 1999, **2001**, 2003, 2005, 2007, **2009**, **2011**, 2013, **2015**, **2017**)
Saudi Arabia	Semifinalist of 2018 Asian Championship	23 January 2018	8 (1997, 1999, 2001, 2003, 2009, 2013, 2015, 2017)
Qatar	Semifinalist of 2018 Asian Championship	23 January 2018	6 (2003, 2005, 2007, 2013, 2015, 2017)
~~South Korea~~	Semifinalist of 2018 Asian Championship	23 January 2018	11 (1986, 1990, 1993, 1995, 1997, 1999, 2001, 2007, 2009, 2011, 2013)
Bahrain	Semifinalist of 2018 Asian Championship	24 January 2018	2 (2011, 2017)
Tunisia	Finalist of 2018 African Championship	25 January 2018	13 (1967, 1995, 1997, 1999, 2001, 2003, 2005, 2007, 2009, 2011, 2013, 2015, 2017)
Egypt	Finalist of 2018 African Championship	25 January 2018	14 (1964, 1993, 1995, 1997, 1999, 2001, 2003, 2005, 2007, 2009, 2011, 2013, 2015, 2017)
Angola	Third place of 2018 African Championship	27 January 2018	3 (2005, 2007, 2017)
Spain	European Champion	28 January 2018	19 (1958, 1974, 1978, 1982, 1986, 1990, 1993, 1995, 1997, 1999, 2001, 2003, **2005**, 2007, 2009, 2011, **2013**, 2015, 2017)
Japan	Wildcard	9 May 2018	14 (1961, 1964, 1967, 1970, 1974, 1978, 1982, 1990, 1995, 1997, 2005, 2011, 2017)
Russia	European playoffs	12 June 2018	12 (**1993**, 1995, **1997**, 1999, 2001, 2003, 2005, 2007, 2009, 2013, 2015, 2017)
Norway	European playoffs	12 June 2018	14 (1958, 1961, 1964, 1967, 1970, 1993, 1997, 1999, 2001, 2005, 2007, 2009, 2011, 2017)
North Macedonia	European playoffs	13 June 2018	5 (1999, 2009, 2013, 2015, 2017)
Hungary	European playoffs	13 June 2018	19 (1958, 1964, 1967, 1970, 1974, 1978, 1982, 1986, 1990, 1993, 1995, 1997, 1999, 2003, 2007, 2009, 2011, 2013, 2017)
Sweden	European playoffs	13 June 2018	23 (1938, **1954**, **1958**, 1961, 1964, 1967, 1970, 1974, 1978, 1982, 1986, **1990**, 1993, 1995, 1997, **1999**, 2001, 2003, 2005, 2009, 2011, 2015, 2017)
Austria	European playoffs	13 June 2018	5 (1938, 1958, 1993, 2011, 2015)
Iceland	European playoffs	13 June 2018	19 (1958, 1961, 1964, 1970, 1974, 1978, 1986, 1990, 1993, 1995, 1997, 2001, 2003, 2005, 2007, 2011, 2013, 2015, 2017)
Croatia	European playoffs	14 June 2018	12 (1995, 1997, 1999, 2001, **2003**, 2005, 2007, 2009, 2011, 2013, 2015, 2017)
Serbia	European playoffs	14 June 2018	3 ( 2009, 2011, 2013)
Brazil	Finalist of 2018 Pan American Championship	23 June 2018	13 (1958, 1995, 1997, 1999, 2001, 2003, 2005, 2007, 2009, 2011, 2013, 2015, 2017)
Argentina	Finalist of 2018 Pan American Championship	23 June 2018	11 (1997, 1999, 2001, 2003, 2005, 2007, 2009, 2011, 2013, 2015, 2017)
Chile	Third place of 2018 Pan American Championship	24 June 2018	4 (2011, 2013, 2015, 2017)
Korea	Wildcard^{2}	10 October 2018	0 (debut)

^{1} Bold indicates champion for that year. Italic indicates host country for that year
^{2} The associations of South Korea and North Korea were invited by the International Handball Federation to enter a unified team in the championship. South Korea, which had 11 previous appearances (1986, 1990, 1993, 1995, 1997, 1999, 2001, 2007, 2009, 2011, 2013), originally qualified as the semifinalist of the 2018 Asian Championship.
^{3} From both German teams only East Germany was qualified in 1990

== Draw ==
The draw took place on 25 June 2018 in Copenhagen, Denmark.

=== Seeding ===
The seedings and draw procedure were announced on 22 June 2018.

Pot 1	Pot 2	Pot 3	Pot 4	Pot 5	Pot 6
France; Spain; Sweden; Denmark	Croatia; Russia; Norway; Hungary	Qatar; Germany; Austria; North Macedonia^{3}	Serbia; Tunisia; Iceland; Argentina	Brazil; Egypt; Bahrain; Chile	South Korea^{4} Saudi Arabia; Angola; Japan

^{3} Official name since February 2019. During the championships: Former Yugoslavian Republic of Macedonia (FYROM).
^{4} Later replaced by a Unified Korea team

== Referees ==
The referee pairs were selected on 25 October 2018.

Referees
Argentina	Julian Grillo; Sebastián Lenci
Croatia	Matija Gubica; Boris Milošević
Czech Republic	Václav Horáček; Jiří Novotný
Denmark	Martin Gjeding; Mads Hansen
France	Karim Gasmi; Raouf Gasmi
Germany	Robert Schulze; Tobias Tönnies
Iran	Majid Kolahdouzan; Alireza Mousaviannazhad
North Macedonia	Gjorgji Nachevski; Slave Nikolov

Referees
Montenegro	Ivan Pavićević; Miloš Ražnatović
Norway	Håvard Kleven; Lars Jørum
Portugal	Duarte Santos; Ricardo Fonseca
Slovenia	Bojan Lah; David Sok
Spain	Óscar López; Ángel Ramírez
Sweden	Mirza Kurtagic; Mattias Wetterwik
Switzerland	Arthur Brunner; Morad Salah
Tunisia	Ismail Boualloucha; Ramzi Khenissi

== Preliminary round ==
The provisional schedule was confirmed on 28 June 2018 and the final schedule was announced on 31 October 2018.

=== Tiebreakers ===
In the group stage, teams are ranked according to points (2 points for a win, 1 point for a draw, 0 points for a loss). After completion of the group stage, if two or more teams have scored the same number of points, the ranking will be determined as follows:

1. Highest number of points in matches between the teams directly involved;
2. Superior goal difference in matches between the teams directly involved;
3. Highest number of goals scored in matches between the teams directly involved (or in the away match in case of a two-team tie);
4. Superior goal difference in all matches of the group;
5. Highest number of plus goals in all matches of the group;

If the ranking of one of these teams is determined, the above criteria are consecutively followed until the ranking of all teams is determined. If no ranking can be determined, a decision shall be obtained by IHF through drawing of lots.

During the group stage, only criteria 4–5 apply to determine the provisional ranking of teams.

All times are local (UTC+1).

=== Group A ===
Pos	Team	Pld	W	D	L	GF	GA	GD	Pts	Qualification
1	France	5	4	1	0	138	113	+25	9	Main round
2	Germany (H)	5	3	2	0	142	110	+32	8	Main round
3	Brazil	5	3	0	2	127	129	−2	6	Main round
4	Russia	5	1	2	2	131	127	+4	4	
5	Serbia	5	1	1	3	127	146	−19	3	
6	Korea	5	0	0	5	124	164	−40	0	

Source: IHF
Rules for classification: 1) points; 2) head-to-head points; 3) head-to-head goal difference; 4) head-to-head number of goals scored; 5) goal difference.
(H) Hosts

10 January 2019; 18:15	Korea	19–30	Germany	Mercedes-Benz Arena, Berlin; Attendance: 13,500; Referees: Gjeding, Hansen (DEN)
10 January 2019; 18:15	Jang, Kang T. 4	(10–17)	Gensheimer 7	Mercedes-Benz Arena, Berlin; Attendance: 13,500; Referees: Gjeding, Hansen (DEN)
10 January 2019; 18:15	5× (suspension) 1× (red card)	Report	1× (yellow card) 6× (suspension)	Mercedes-Benz Arena, Berlin; Attendance: 13,500; Referees: Gjeding, Hansen (DEN)

11 January 2019; 18:00	Serbia	30–30	Russia	Mercedes-Benz Arena, Berlin; Attendance: 10,468; Referees: Jørum, Kleven (NOR)
11 January 2019; 18:00	N. Ilić 6	(16–16)	Dibirov 12	Mercedes-Benz Arena, Berlin; Attendance: 10,468; Referees: Jørum, Kleven (NOR)
11 January 2019; 18:00	2× (yellow card) 5× (suspension)	Report	1× (yellow card) 4× (suspension)	Mercedes-Benz Arena, Berlin; Attendance: 10,468; Referees: Jørum, Kleven (NOR)

11 January 2019; 20:30	Brazil	22–24	France	Mercedes-Benz Arena, Berlin; Attendance: 10,529; Referees: Kurtagic, Wetterwik (SWE)
11 January 2019; 20:30	Toledo 8	(13–16)	Guigou, Mem 6	Mercedes-Benz Arena, Berlin; Attendance: 10,529; Referees: Kurtagic, Wetterwik (SWE)
11 January 2019; 20:30	3× (yellow card) 5× (suspension)	Report	3× (yellow card) 4× (suspension)	Mercedes-Benz Arena, Berlin; Attendance: 10,529; Referees: Kurtagic, Wetterwik (SWE)

12 January 2019; 15:30	Russia	34–27	Korea	Mercedes-Benz Arena, Berlin; Attendance: 10,039; Referees: Pavićević, Ražnatović (MNE)
12 January 2019; 15:30	Shishkarev 7	(20–13)	Kang J., Park K. 4	Mercedes-Benz Arena, Berlin; Attendance: 10,039; Referees: Pavićević, Ražnatović (MNE)
12 January 2019; 15:30	2× (yellow card) 8× (suspension) 1× (red card)	Report	1× (yellow card) 2× (suspension)	Mercedes-Benz Arena, Berlin; Attendance: 10,039; Referees: Pavićević, Ražnatović (MNE)

12 January 2019; 18:15	Germany	34–21	Brazil	Mercedes-Benz Arena, Berlin; Attendance: 13,500; Referees: Kleven, Jørum (NOR)
12 January 2019; 18:15	Gensheimer 10	(15–8)	Toledo 5	Mercedes-Benz Arena, Berlin; Attendance: 13,500; Referees: Kleven, Jørum (NOR)
12 January 2019; 18:15	2× (yellow card) 4× (suspension)	Report	2× (yellow card) 6× (suspension) 1× (red card)	Mercedes-Benz Arena, Berlin; Attendance: 13,500; Referees: Kleven, Jørum (NOR)

12 January 2019; 20:30	France	32–21	Serbia	Mercedes-Benz Arena, Berlin; Attendance: 13,500; Referees: Gjeding, Hansen (DEN)
12 January 2019; 20:30	Fabregas, Remili 5	(15–12)	Radivojević 6	Mercedes-Benz Arena, Berlin; Attendance: 13,500; Referees: Gjeding, Hansen (DEN)
12 January 2019; 20:30	2× (suspension)	Report	2× (yellow card) 4× (suspension)	Mercedes-Benz Arena, Berlin; Attendance: 13,500; Referees: Gjeding, Hansen (DEN)

14 January 2019; 15:30	Serbia	22–24	Brazil	Mercedes-Benz Arena, Berlin; Attendance: 10,211; Referees: Gjeding, Hansen (DEN)
14 January 2019; 15:30	Marsenić, Radivojević 5	(11–14)	Toledo 5	Mercedes-Benz Arena, Berlin; Attendance: 10,211; Referees: Gjeding, Hansen (DEN)
14 January 2019; 15:30	3× (yellow card) 6× (suspension) 1× (red card)	Report	2× (yellow card) 3× (suspension)	Mercedes-Benz Arena, Berlin; Attendance: 10,211; Referees: Gjeding, Hansen (DEN)

14 January 2019; 18:00	Russia	22–22	Germany	Mercedes-Benz Arena, Berlin; Attendance: 13,500; Referees: Kurtagic, Wetterwik (SWE)
14 January 2019; 18:00	Dibirov 8	(10–12)	Gensheimer 8	Mercedes-Benz Arena, Berlin; Attendance: 13,500; Referees: Kurtagic, Wetterwik (SWE)
14 January 2019; 18:00	3× (yellow card) 5× (suspension)	Report	3× (yellow card) 3× (suspension)	Mercedes-Benz Arena, Berlin; Attendance: 13,500; Referees: Kurtagic, Wetterwik (SWE)

14 January 2019; 20:30	France	34–23	Korea	Mercedes-Benz Arena, Berlin; Attendance: 10,331; Referees: Pavićević, Ražnatović (MNE)
14 January 2019; 20:30	Remili 7	(17–16)	Kang T. 7	Mercedes-Benz Arena, Berlin; Attendance: 10,331; Referees: Pavićević, Ražnatović (MNE)
14 January 2019; 20:30	3× (yellow card) 6× (suspension)	Report	2× (yellow card) 3× (suspension)	Mercedes-Benz Arena, Berlin; Attendance: 10,331; Referees: Pavićević, Ražnatović (MNE)

15 January 2019; 15:30	Russia	23–25	Brazil	Mercedes-Benz Arena, Berlin; Attendance: 9,011; Referees: Pavićević, Ražnatović (MNE)
15 January 2019; 15:30	Dibirov, Zhitnikov 6	(10–15)	Borges 7	Mercedes-Benz Arena, Berlin; Attendance: 9,011; Referees: Pavićević, Ražnatović (MNE)
15 January 2019; 15:30	1× (yellow card) 6× (suspension) 1× (red card)	Report	2× (yellow card) 5× (suspension)	Mercedes-Benz Arena, Berlin; Attendance: 9,011; Referees: Pavićević, Ražnatović (MNE)

15 January 2019; 18:00	Korea	29–31	Serbia	Mercedes-Benz Arena, Berlin; Attendance: 11,953; Referees: Kurtagic, Wetterwik (SWE)
15 January 2019; 18:00	Kang J. 12	(16–14)	Vorkapić 7	Mercedes-Benz Arena, Berlin; Attendance: 11,953; Referees: Kurtagic, Wetterwik (SWE)
15 January 2019; 18:00	1× (yellow card) 3× (suspension)	Report	2× (yellow card) 5× (suspension) 1× (red card)	Mercedes-Benz Arena, Berlin; Attendance: 11,953; Referees: Kurtagic, Wetterwik (SWE)

15 January 2019; 20:30	Germany	25–25	France	Mercedes-Benz Arena, Berlin; Attendance: 13,500; Referees: Gjeding, Hansen (DEN)
15 January 2019; 20:30	three players 4	(12–10)	Mahé 9	Mercedes-Benz Arena, Berlin; Attendance: 13,500; Referees: Gjeding, Hansen (DEN)
15 January 2019; 20:30	2× (yellow card) 5× (suspension)	Report	6× (suspension)	Mercedes-Benz Arena, Berlin; Attendance: 13,500; Referees: Gjeding, Hansen (DEN)

17 January 2019; 15:30	Brazil	35–26	Korea	Mercedes-Benz Arena, Berlin; Attendance: 8,933; Referees: Jørum, Kleven (NOR)
17 January 2019; 15:30	Borges 6	(18–10)	Kang J. 5	Mercedes-Benz Arena, Berlin; Attendance: 8,933; Referees: Jørum, Kleven (NOR)
17 January 2019; 15:30	2× (yellow card) 5× (suspension)	Report	1× (yellow card) 2× (suspension)	Mercedes-Benz Arena, Berlin; Attendance: 8,933; Referees: Jørum, Kleven (NOR)

17 January 2019; 18:00	Germany	31–23	Serbia	Mercedes-Benz Arena, Berlin; Attendance: 13,500; Referees: Pavićević, Ražnatović (MNE)
17 January 2019; 18:00	Musche 5	(16–12)	N. Ilić 6	Mercedes-Benz Arena, Berlin; Attendance: 13,500; Referees: Pavićević, Ražnatović (MNE)
17 January 2019; 18:00	1× (yellow card) 3× (suspension) 1× (red card)	Report	3× (yellow card) 7× (suspension)	Mercedes-Benz Arena, Berlin; Attendance: 13,500; Referees: Pavićević, Ražnatović (MNE)

17 January 2019; 20:30	France	23–22	Russia	Mercedes-Benz Arena, Berlin; Attendance: 11,287; Referees: Horáček, Novotný (CZE)
17 January 2019; 20:30	Richardson 4	(12–12)	Shkurinskiy 4	Mercedes-Benz Arena, Berlin; Attendance: 11,287; Referees: Horáček, Novotný (CZE)
17 January 2019; 20:30	2× (yellow card)	Report	1× (yellow card) 4× (suspension)	Mercedes-Benz Arena, Berlin; Attendance: 11,287; Referees: Horáček, Novotný (CZE)

=== Group B ===
Pos	Team	Pld	W	D	L	GF	GA	GD	Pts	Qualification
1	Croatia	5	5	0	0	152	115	+37	10	Main round
2	Spain	5	4	0	1	142	114	+28	8	Main round
3	Iceland	5	3	0	2	137	124	+13	6	Main round
4	North Macedonia	5	2	0	3	131	139	−8	4	
5	Bahrain	5	1	0	4	107	151	−44	2	
6	Japan	5	0	0	5	121	147	−26	0	

Source: IHF
Rules for classification: 1) points; 2) head-to-head points; 3) head-to-head goal difference; 4) head-to-head number of goals scored; 5) goal difference.

11 January 2019; 15:30	Japan	29–38	North Macedonia	Olympiahalle, Munich; Attendance: 7,500; Referees: Horáček, Novotný (CZE)
11 January 2019; 15:30	Watanabe 5	(13–18)	K. Lazarov 8	Olympiahalle, Munich; Attendance: 7,500; Referees: Horáček, Novotný (CZE)
11 January 2019; 15:30	3× (suspension)	Report	1× (yellow card) 4× (suspension)	Olympiahalle, Munich; Attendance: 7,500; Referees: Horáček, Novotný (CZE)

11 January 2019; 18:00	Iceland	27–31	Croatia	Olympiahalle, Munich; Attendance: 12,000; Referees: Boualloucha, Khenissi (TUN)
11 January 2019; 18:00	Pálmarsson 7	(14–16)	Stepančić 8	Olympiahalle, Munich; Attendance: 12,000; Referees: Boualloucha, Khenissi (TUN)
11 January 2019; 18:00	2× (yellow card) 5× (suspension)	Report	3× (yellow card) 2× (suspension)	Olympiahalle, Munich; Attendance: 12,000; Referees: Boualloucha, Khenissi (TUN)

11 January 2019; 20:30	Bahrain	23–33	Spain	Olympiahalle, Munich; Attendance: 9,800; Referees: Grillo, Lenci (ARG)
11 January 2019; 20:30	Al-Sayyad, Habib 7	(11–16)	Solé 7	Olympiahalle, Munich; Attendance: 9,800; Referees: Grillo, Lenci (ARG)
11 January 2019; 20:30	2× (yellow card) 6× (suspension)	Report	2× (yellow card) 4× (suspension)	Olympiahalle, Munich; Attendance: 9,800; Referees: Grillo, Lenci (ARG)

13 January 2019; 14:00	North Macedonia	28–23	Bahrain	Olympiahalle, Munich; Attendance: 8,500; Referees: Boualloucha, Khenissi (TUN)
13 January 2019; 14:00	K. Lazarov 8	(12–8)	Al-Sayyad 6	Olympiahalle, Munich; Attendance: 8,500; Referees: Boualloucha, Khenissi (TUN)
13 January 2019; 14:00	1× (yellow card) 3× (suspension)	Report	1× (yellow card) 3× (suspension)	Olympiahalle, Munich; Attendance: 8,500; Referees: Boualloucha, Khenissi (TUN)

13 January 2019; 16:30	Croatia	35–27	Japan	Olympiahalle, Munich; Attendance: 12,000; Referees: Brunner, Salah (SUI)
13 January 2019; 16:30	Horvat 8	(18–13)	Tokuda 6	Olympiahalle, Munich; Attendance: 12,000; Referees: Brunner, Salah (SUI)
13 January 2019; 16:30	3× (yellow card) 2× (suspension)	Report	3× (yellow card) 2× (suspension)	Olympiahalle, Munich; Attendance: 12,000; Referees: Brunner, Salah (SUI)

13 January 2019; 19:00	Spain	32–25	Iceland	Olympiahalle, Munich; Attendance: 12,000; Referees: Horáček, Novotný (CZE)
13 January 2019; 19:00	Solé 5	(19–14)	Guðmundsson 6	Olympiahalle, Munich; Attendance: 12,000; Referees: Horáček, Novotný (CZE)
13 January 2019; 19:00	1× (yellow card) 3× (suspension)	Report	2× (yellow card) 6× (suspension)	Olympiahalle, Munich; Attendance: 12,000; Referees: Horáček, Novotný (CZE)

14 January 2019; 15:30	Iceland	36–18	Bahrain	Olympiahalle, Munich; Attendance: 6,000; Referees: Brunner, Salah (SUI)
14 January 2019; 15:30	Gunnarsson 8	(16–10)	Merza 5	Olympiahalle, Munich; Attendance: 6,000; Referees: Brunner, Salah (SUI)
14 January 2019; 15:30	2× (yellow card) 4× (suspension)	Report	2× (yellow card) 5× (suspension) 2× (red card)	Olympiahalle, Munich; Attendance: 6,000; Referees: Brunner, Salah (SUI)

14 January 2019; 18:00	Croatia	31–22	North Macedonia	Olympiahalle, Munich; Attendance: 9,800; Referees: Horáček, Novotný (CZE)
14 January 2019; 18:00	Duvnjak 6	(16–11)	Manaskov 6	Olympiahalle, Munich; Attendance: 9,800; Referees: Horáček, Novotný (CZE)
14 January 2019; 18:00	2× (yellow card) 3× (suspension)	Report	1× (yellow card) 3× (suspension)	Olympiahalle, Munich; Attendance: 9,800; Referees: Horáček, Novotný (CZE)

14 January 2019; 20:30	Spain	26–22	Japan	Olympiahalle, Munich; Attendance: 7,300; Referees: Grillo, Lenci (ARG)
14 January 2019; 20:30	Solé 8	(10–11)	Tokuda 7	Olympiahalle, Munich; Attendance: 7,300; Referees: Grillo, Lenci (ARG)
14 January 2019; 20:30	3× (suspension)	Report	2× (yellow card) 3× (suspension)	Olympiahalle, Munich; Attendance: 7,300; Referees: Grillo, Lenci (ARG)

16 January 2019; 15:30	Japan	21–25	Iceland	Olympiahalle, Munich; Attendance: 6,000; Referees: Boualloucha, Khenissi (TUN)
16 January 2019; 15:30	Agarie 4	(12–13)	Gunnarsson, Sigurmannsson 5	Olympiahalle, Munich; Attendance: 6,000; Referees: Boualloucha, Khenissi (TUN)
16 January 2019; 15:30	1× (yellow card) 1× (suspension) 1× (red card)	Report	2× (yellow card) 2× (suspension)	Olympiahalle, Munich; Attendance: 6,000; Referees: Boualloucha, Khenissi (TUN)

16 January 2019; 18:00	Croatia	32–20	Bahrain	Olympiahalle, Munich; Attendance: 8,600; Referees: Grillo, Lenci (ARG)
16 January 2019; 18:00	Štrlek 11	(19–9)	Jalal 5	Olympiahalle, Munich; Attendance: 8,600; Referees: Grillo, Lenci (ARG)
16 January 2019; 18:00	3× (yellow card) 7× (suspension)	Report	1× (yellow card) 5× (suspension)	Olympiahalle, Munich; Attendance: 8,600; Referees: Grillo, Lenci (ARG)

16 January 2019; 20:30	North Macedonia	21–32	Spain	Olympiahalle, Munich; Attendance: 9,600; Referees: Brunner, Salah (SUI)
16 January 2019; 20:30	Peševski 6	(12–13)	Gómez 6	Olympiahalle, Munich; Attendance: 9,600; Referees: Brunner, Salah (SUI)
16 January 2019; 20:30	1× (yellow card) 4× (suspension)	Report	1× (yellow card) 2× (suspension)	Olympiahalle, Munich; Attendance: 9,600; Referees: Brunner, Salah (SUI)

17 January 2019; 15:30	Bahrain	23–22	Japan	Olympiahalle, Munich; Attendance: 5,200; Referees: Brunner, Salah (SUI)
17 January 2019; 15:30	Basham 6	(10–9)	Motoki 9	Olympiahalle, Munich; Attendance: 5,200; Referees: Brunner, Salah (SUI)
17 January 2019; 15:30	4× (suspension)	Report	2× (yellow card) 4× (suspension)	Olympiahalle, Munich; Attendance: 5,200; Referees: Brunner, Salah (SUI)

17 January 2019; 18:00	North Macedonia	22–24	Iceland	Olympiahalle, Munich; Attendance: 10,100; Referees: Kurtagic, Wetterwik (SWE)
17 January 2019; 18:00	K. Lazarov, Manaskov 5	(13–11)	Gunnarsson 10	Olympiahalle, Munich; Attendance: 10,100; Referees: Kurtagic, Wetterwik (SWE)
17 January 2019; 18:00	3× (yellow card) 3× (suspension)	Report	2× (yellow card) 4× (suspension)	Olympiahalle, Munich; Attendance: 10,100; Referees: Kurtagic, Wetterwik (SWE)

17 January 2019; 20:30	Spain	19–23	Croatia	Olympiahalle, Munich; Attendance: 12,000; Referees: Gjeding, Hansen (DEN)
17 January 2019; 20:30	Solé 5	(10–13)	Horvat 8	Olympiahalle, Munich; Attendance: 12,000; Referees: Gjeding, Hansen (DEN)
17 January 2019; 20:30	1× (yellow card) 1× (suspension)	Report	3× (yellow card) 2× (suspension)	Olympiahalle, Munich; Attendance: 12,000; Referees: Gjeding, Hansen (DEN)

=== Group C ===
Pos	Team	Pld	W	D	L	GF	GA	GD	Pts	Qualification
1	Denmark (H)	5	5	0	0	167	103	+64	10	Main round
2	Norway	5	4	0	1	175	119	+56	8	Main round
3	Tunisia	5	3	0	2	138	147	−9	6	Main round
4	Chile	5	2	0	3	130	167	−37	4	
5	Austria	5	1	0	4	121	148	−27	2	
6	Saudi Arabia	5	0	0	5	112	159	−47	0	

Source: IHF
Rules for classification: 1) points; 2) head-to-head points; 3) head-to-head goal difference; 4) head-to-head number of goals scored; 5) goal difference.
(H) Hosts

10 January 2019; 20:15	Chile	16–39	Denmark	Royal Arena, Copenhagen; Attendance: 12,500; Referees: Fonseca, Santos (POR)
10 January 2019; 20:15	Salinas 4	(4–22)	Mortensen 8	Royal Arena, Copenhagen; Attendance: 12,500; Referees: Fonseca, Santos (POR)
10 January 2019; 20:15	5× (suspension)	Report	2× (yellow card) 5× (suspension)	Royal Arena, Copenhagen; Attendance: 12,500; Referees: Fonseca, Santos (POR)

Jonas Andersen was attending this game as a spectator.

11 January 2019; 18:00	Saudi Arabia	22–29	Austria	Jyske Bank Boxen, Herning; Attendance: 6,500; Referees: Schulze, Tönnies (GER)
11 January 2019; 18:00	Ma. Al-Salem 7	(9–15)	Bilyk 7	Jyske Bank Boxen, Herning; Attendance: 6,500; Referees: Schulze, Tönnies (GER)
11 January 2019; 18:00	2× (yellow card) 6× (suspension) 1× (red card)	Report	2× (yellow card) 5× (suspension)	Jyske Bank Boxen, Herning; Attendance: 6,500; Referees: Schulze, Tönnies (GER)

11 January 2019; 20:30	Tunisia	24–34	Norway	Jyske Bank Boxen, Herning; Attendance: 6,500; Referees: Gubica, Milošević (CRO)
11 January 2019; 20:30	Jaballah 5	(13–18)	Jøndal 9	Jyske Bank Boxen, Herning; Attendance: 6,500; Referees: Gubica, Milošević (CRO)
11 January 2019; 20:30	2× (yellow card) 5× (suspension)	Report	1× (yellow card) 5× (suspension)	Jyske Bank Boxen, Herning; Attendance: 6,500; Referees: Gubica, Milošević (CRO)

12 January 2019; 15:00	Austria	24–32	Chile	Jyske Bank Boxen, Herning; Attendance: 5,900; Referees: Gasmi, Gasmi (FRA)
12 January 2019; 15:00	Weber 6	(15–14)	Er. Feuchtmann 9	Jyske Bank Boxen, Herning; Attendance: 5,900; Referees: Gasmi, Gasmi (FRA)
12 January 2019; 15:00	2× (yellow card) 6× (suspension)	Report	1× (yellow card) 5× (suspension)	Jyske Bank Boxen, Herning; Attendance: 5,900; Referees: Gasmi, Gasmi (FRA)

12 January 2019; 17:30	Norway	40–21	Saudi Arabia	Jyske Bank Boxen, Herning; Attendance: 12,002; Referees: Schulze, Tönnies (GER)
12 January 2019; 17:30	Rød 9	(20–10)	Ma. Al-Salem 7	Jyske Bank Boxen, Herning; Attendance: 12,002; Referees: Schulze, Tönnies (GER)
12 January 2019; 17:30	3× (yellow card) 3× (suspension)	Report	1× (yellow card) 2× (suspension)	Jyske Bank Boxen, Herning; Attendance: 12,002; Referees: Schulze, Tönnies (GER)

12 January 2019; 20:15	Denmark	36–22	Tunisia	Jyske Bank Boxen, Herning; Attendance: 15,000; Referees: Lah, Sok (SVN)
12 January 2019; 20:15	M. Hansen, Lauge 7	(19–10)	Chouiref 5	Jyske Bank Boxen, Herning; Attendance: 15,000; Referees: Lah, Sok (SVN)
12 January 2019; 20:15	3× (yellow card) 7× (suspension)	Report	2× (yellow card) 2× (suspension)	Jyske Bank Boxen, Herning; Attendance: 15,000; Referees: Lah, Sok (SVN)

14 January 2019; 15:00	Tunisia	36–30	Chile	Jyske Bank Boxen, Herning; Attendance: 3,247; Referees: Gubica, Milošević (CRO)
14 January 2019; 15:00	Chouiref, Soussi 7	(18–15)	Er. Feuchtmann, Salinas 8	Jyske Bank Boxen, Herning; Attendance: 3,247; Referees: Gubica, Milošević (CRO)
14 January 2019; 15:00	2× (yellow card) 4× (suspension)	Report	2× (yellow card) 5× (suspension)	Jyske Bank Boxen, Herning; Attendance: 3,247; Referees: Gubica, Milošević (CRO)

14 January 2019; 17:30	Norway	34–24	Austria	Jyske Bank Boxen, Herning; Attendance: 8,716; Referees: Lah, Sok (SVN)
14 January 2019; 17:30	Sagosen 8	(16–13)	Božović 7	Jyske Bank Boxen, Herning; Attendance: 8,716; Referees: Lah, Sok (SVN)
14 January 2019; 17:30	2× (yellow card) 1× (suspension)	Report	2× (yellow card) 5× (suspension)	Jyske Bank Boxen, Herning; Attendance: 8,716; Referees: Lah, Sok (SVN)

14 January 2019; 20:15	Denmark	34–22	Saudi Arabia	Jyske Bank Boxen, Herning; Attendance: 12,157; Referees: Gasmi, Gasmi (FRA)
14 January 2019; 20:15	M. Landin 7	(17–11)	Mo. Al-Salem 4	Jyske Bank Boxen, Herning; Attendance: 12,157; Referees: Gasmi, Gasmi (FRA)
14 January 2019; 20:15	1× (yellow card) 5× (suspension)	Report	1× (yellow card) 7× (suspension) 1× (red card)	Jyske Bank Boxen, Herning; Attendance: 12,157; Referees: Gasmi, Gasmi (FRA)

15 January 2019; 16:15	Saudi Arabia	20–24	Tunisia	Jyske Bank Boxen, Herning; Attendance: 4,571; Referees: Lah, Sok (SVN)
15 January 2019; 16:15	Al-Abdulali 5	(8–12)	Boughanmi, Sanaï 7	Jyske Bank Boxen, Herning; Attendance: 4,571; Referees: Lah, Sok (SVN)
15 January 2019; 16:15	1× (yellow card) 4× (suspension)	Report	1× (yellow card) 3× (suspension) 1× (red card)	Jyske Bank Boxen, Herning; Attendance: 4,571; Referees: Lah, Sok (SVN)

15 January 2019; 18:30	Norway	41–20	Chile	Jyske Bank Boxen, Herning; Attendance: 11,247; Referees: Gasmi, Gasmi (FRA)
15 January 2019; 18:30	Blonz 8	(21–12)	Salinas 9	Jyske Bank Boxen, Herning; Attendance: 11,247; Referees: Gasmi, Gasmi (FRA)
15 January 2019; 18:30	2× (yellow card) 1× (suspension)	Report	1× (yellow card) 2× (suspension)	Jyske Bank Boxen, Herning; Attendance: 11,247; Referees: Gasmi, Gasmi (FRA)

15 January 2019; 20:45	Austria	17–28	Denmark	Jyske Bank Boxen, Herning; Attendance: 14,607; Referees: Schulze, Tönnies (GER)
15 January 2019; 20:45	three players 3	(8–11)	M. Landin, Lauge 6	Jyske Bank Boxen, Herning; Attendance: 14,607; Referees: Schulze, Tönnies (GER)
15 January 2019; 20:45	1× (yellow card) 2× (suspension)	Report	2× (yellow card)	Jyske Bank Boxen, Herning; Attendance: 14,607; Referees: Schulze, Tönnies (GER)

17 January 2019; 15:00	Chile	32–27	Saudi Arabia	Jyske Bank Boxen, Herning; Attendance: 3,526; Referees: Gubica, Milošević (CRO)
17 January 2019; 15:00	Er. Feuchtmann 11	(21–13)	Mo. Al-Salem 8	Jyske Bank Boxen, Herning; Attendance: 3,526; Referees: Gubica, Milošević (CRO)
17 January 2019; 15:00	1× (yellow card) 5× (suspension)	Report	1× (yellow card) 9× (suspension) 2× (red card)	Jyske Bank Boxen, Herning; Attendance: 3,526; Referees: Gubica, Milošević (CRO)

17 January 2019; 17:30	Austria	27–32	Tunisia	Jyske Bank Boxen, Herning; Attendance: 11,834; Referees: Santos, Fonseca (POR)
17 January 2019; 17:30	Weber 9	(14–18)	Boughanmi 9	Jyske Bank Boxen, Herning; Attendance: 11,834; Referees: Santos, Fonseca (POR)
17 January 2019; 17:30	2× (yellow card) 6× (suspension)	Report	2× (yellow card) 5× (suspension)	Jyske Bank Boxen, Herning; Attendance: 11,834; Referees: Santos, Fonseca (POR)

17 January 2019; 20:15	Denmark	30–26	Norway	Jyske Bank Boxen, Herning; Attendance: 15,001; Referees: Nachevski, Nikolov (MKD)
17 January 2019; 20:15	M. Hansen 14	(17–14)	Johannessen 5	Jyske Bank Boxen, Herning; Attendance: 15,001; Referees: Nachevski, Nikolov (MKD)
17 January 2019; 20:15	2× (yellow card) 4× (suspension)	Report	3× (yellow card) 4× (suspension)	Jyske Bank Boxen, Herning; Attendance: 15,001; Referees: Nachevski, Nikolov (MKD)

=== Group D ===
Pos	Team	Pld	W	D	L	GF	GA	GD	Pts	Qualification
1	Sweden	5	5	0	0	151	111	+40	10	Main round
2	Hungary	5	2	2	1	151	138	+13	6	Main round
3	Egypt	5	2	1	2	132	133	−1	5	Main round
4	Qatar	5	2	0	3	125	127	−2	4	
5	Argentina	5	1	1	3	119	130	−11	3	
6	Angola	5	1	0	4	121	160	−39	2	

Source: IHF
Rules for classification: 1) points; 2) head-to-head points; 3) head-to-head goal difference; 4) head-to-head number of goals scored; 5) goal difference.

11 January 2019; 15:30	Angola	24–23	Qatar	Royal Arena, Copenhagen; Attendance: 1,870; Referees: Fonseca, Santos (POR)
11 January 2019; 15:30	Hebo 7	(12–8)	Berrached 6	Royal Arena, Copenhagen; Attendance: 1,870; Referees: Fonseca, Santos (POR)
11 January 2019; 15:30	2× (yellow card) 6× (suspension)	Report	2× (yellow card) 4× (suspension)	Royal Arena, Copenhagen; Attendance: 1,870; Referees: Fonseca, Santos (POR)

11 January 2019; 18:00	Argentina	25–25	Hungary	Royal Arena, Copenhagen; Attendance: 4,272; Referees: López, Ramírez (ESP)
11 January 2019; 18:00	Simonet 6	(10–13)	Balogh 11	Royal Arena, Copenhagen; Attendance: 4,272; Referees: López, Ramírez (ESP)
11 January 2019; 18:00	3× (yellow card) 4× (suspension)	Report	2× (yellow card) 3× (suspension)	Royal Arena, Copenhagen; Attendance: 4,272; Referees: López, Ramírez (ESP)

11 January 2019; 20:30	Egypt	24–27	Sweden	Royal Arena, Copenhagen; Attendance: 6,448; Referees: Nachevski, Nikolov (MKD)
11 January 2019; 20:30	El-Ahmar, Shebib 5	(11–13)	Gottfridsson, L. Nilsson 5	Royal Arena, Copenhagen; Attendance: 6,448; Referees: Nachevski, Nikolov (MKD)
11 January 2019; 20:30	3× (yellow card) 1× (suspension)	Report	2× (yellow card) 4× (suspension)	Royal Arena, Copenhagen; Attendance: 6,448; Referees: Nachevski, Nikolov (MKD)

13 January 2019; 15:30	Qatar	28–23	Egypt	Royal Arena, Copenhagen; Attendance: 3,077; Referees: López, Ramírez (ESP)
13 January 2019; 15:30	Benali 9	(15–12)	El-Ahmar 6	Royal Arena, Copenhagen; Attendance: 3,077; Referees: López, Ramírez (ESP)
13 January 2019; 15:30	3× (yellow card) 6× (suspension)	Report	2× (yellow card) 3× (suspension)	Royal Arena, Copenhagen; Attendance: 3,077; Referees: López, Ramírez (ESP)

13 January 2019; 18:00	Hungary	34–24	Angola	Royal Arena, Copenhagen; Attendance: 4,891; Referees: Kolahdouzan, Mousaviannazhad (IRN)
13 January 2019; 18:00	Bóka 5	(18–8)	Ferreira 5	Royal Arena, Copenhagen; Attendance: 4,891; Referees: Kolahdouzan, Mousaviannazhad (IRN)
13 January 2019; 18:00	2× (yellow card) 3× (suspension) 1× (red card)	Report	3× (suspension)	Royal Arena, Copenhagen; Attendance: 4,891; Referees: Kolahdouzan, Mousaviannazhad (IRN)

13 January 2019; 20:30	Sweden	31–16	Argentina	Royal Arena, Copenhagen; Attendance: 6,492; Referees: Fonseca, Santos (POR)
13 January 2019; 20:30	Zachrisson 6	(15–10)	F. Fernández 6	Royal Arena, Copenhagen; Attendance: 6,492; Referees: Fonseca, Santos (POR)
13 January 2019; 20:30	1× (yellow card) 8× (suspension)	Report	2× (yellow card) 6× (suspension)	Royal Arena, Copenhagen; Attendance: 6,492; Referees: Fonseca, Santos (POR)

14 January 2019; 15:30	Hungary	32–26	Qatar	Royal Arena, Copenhagen; Attendance: 1,694; Referees: Nachevski, Nikolov (MKD)
14 January 2019; 15:30	Lékai 5	(16–11)	Frankis, Sinen 5	Royal Arena, Copenhagen; Attendance: 1,694; Referees: Nachevski, Nikolov (MKD)
14 January 2019; 15:30	2× (yellow card) 8× (suspension)	Report	1× (yellow card) 5× (suspension) 1× (red card)	Royal Arena, Copenhagen; Attendance: 1,694; Referees: Nachevski, Nikolov (MKD)

14 January 2019; 18:00	Argentina	20–22	Egypt	Royal Arena, Copenhagen; Attendance: 2,607; Referees: Kolahdouzan, Mousaviannazhad (IRN)
14 January 2019; 18:00	F. Fernández 5	(9–8)	Sanad 7	Royal Arena, Copenhagen; Attendance: 2,607; Referees: Kolahdouzan, Mousaviannazhad (IRN)
14 January 2019; 18:00	4× (yellow card) 7× (suspension) 1×	Report	2× (yellow card) 5× (suspension) 1× (red card)	Royal Arena, Copenhagen; Attendance: 2,607; Referees: Kolahdouzan, Mousaviannazhad (IRN)

14 January 2019; 20:30	Sweden	37–19	Angola	Royal Arena, Copenhagen; Attendance: 3,731; Referees: López, Ramírez (ESP)
14 January 2019; 20:30	Ekberg, Zachrisson 5	(19–14)	Hebo 5	Royal Arena, Copenhagen; Attendance: 3,731; Referees: López, Ramírez (ESP)
14 January 2019; 20:30	1× (yellow card) 2× (suspension)	Report	2× (yellow card) 4× (suspension) 1× (red card)	Royal Arena, Copenhagen; Attendance: 3,731; Referees: López, Ramírez (ESP)

16 January 2019; 15:30	Angola	26–33	Argentina	Royal Arena, Copenhagen; Attendance: 1,709; Referees: Nachevski, Nikolov (MKD)
16 January 2019; 15:30	Ferreira 7	(12–17)	Simonet 7	Royal Arena, Copenhagen; Attendance: 1,709; Referees: Nachevski, Nikolov (MKD)
16 January 2019; 15:30	3× (yellow card) 5× (suspension)	Report	2× (yellow card) 1× (suspension)	Royal Arena, Copenhagen; Attendance: 1,709; Referees: Nachevski, Nikolov (MKD)

16 January 2019; 18:00	Hungary	30–30	Egypt	Royal Arena, Copenhagen; Attendance: 3,929; Referees: Fonseca, Santos (POR)
16 January 2019; 18:00	Lékai 6	(14–14)	Zein 7	Royal Arena, Copenhagen; Attendance: 3,929; Referees: Fonseca, Santos (POR)
16 January 2019; 18:00	4× (suspension)	Report	5× (suspension)	Royal Arena, Copenhagen; Attendance: 3,929; Referees: Fonseca, Santos (POR)

16 January 2019; 20:30	Qatar	22–23	Sweden	Royal Arena, Copenhagen; Attendance: 6,079; Referees: Schulze, Tönnies (GER)
16 January 2019; 20:30	Benali 8	(11–10)	L. Nilsson, Zachrisson 7	Royal Arena, Copenhagen; Attendance: 6,079; Referees: Schulze, Tönnies (GER)
16 January 2019; 20:30	3× (yellow card) 4× (suspension)	Report	2× (yellow card) 3× (suspension) 1× (red card)	Royal Arena, Copenhagen; Attendance: 6,079; Referees: Schulze, Tönnies (GER)

17 January 2019; 15:30	Egypt	33–28	Angola	Royal Arena, Copenhagen; Attendance: 2,247; Referees: Kolahdouzan, Mousaviannazhad (IRN)
17 January 2019; 15:30	El-Deraa 8	(19–12)	Sibo 7	Royal Arena, Copenhagen; Attendance: 2,247; Referees: Kolahdouzan, Mousaviannazhad (IRN)
17 January 2019; 15:30	2× (yellow card) 3× (suspension)	Report	1× (yellow card) 4× (suspension) 1× (red card)	Royal Arena, Copenhagen; Attendance: 2,247; Referees: Kolahdouzan, Mousaviannazhad (IRN)

17 January 2019; 18:00	Qatar	26–25	Argentina	Royal Arena, Copenhagen; Attendance: 4,448; Referees: Lah, Sok (SVN)
17 January 2019; 18:00	Frankis 8	(16–13)	Baronetto, Simonet 4	Royal Arena, Copenhagen; Attendance: 4,448; Referees: Lah, Sok (SVN)
17 January 2019; 18:00	1× (yellow card) 3× (suspension)	Report	1× (yellow card) 4× (suspension)	Royal Arena, Copenhagen; Attendance: 4,448; Referees: Lah, Sok (SVN)

17 January 2019; 20:30	Sweden	33–30	Hungary	Royal Arena, Copenhagen; Attendance: 7,803; Referees: López, Ramírez (ESP)
17 January 2019; 20:30	L. Nilsson 7	(16–15)	Lékai 8	Royal Arena, Copenhagen; Attendance: 7,803; Referees: López, Ramírez (ESP)
17 January 2019; 20:30	3× (yellow card) 2× (suspension)	Report	2× (yellow card) 5× (suspension)	Royal Arena, Copenhagen; Attendance: 7,803; Referees: López, Ramírez (ESP)

== Presidents Cup ==
=== 21st–24th place playoffs ===
21st–24th place semifinals
19 January
Korea	27
Japan	25
19 January
Saudi Arabia	34
Angola	29

21st place
20 January
Korea	26
Saudi Arabia	27
23rd place
20 January
Japan	29
Angola	32

==== 21st–24th place semifinals ====
19 January 2019; 13:00	Korea	27–25	Japan	Royal Arena, Copenhagen; Attendance: 4,446; Referees: Gubica, Milošević (CRO)
19 January 2019; 13:00	Kang J. 7	(12–14)	Doi 10	Royal Arena, Copenhagen; Attendance: 4,446; Referees: Gubica, Milošević (CRO)
19 January 2019; 13:00	1× (yellow card) 1× (suspension)	Report	2× (yellow card) 7× (suspension)	Royal Arena, Copenhagen; Attendance: 4,446; Referees: Gubica, Milošević (CRO)

19 January 2019; 15:30	Saudi Arabia	34–29	Angola	Royal Arena, Copenhagen; Attendance: 6,233; Referees: Grillo, Lenci (ARG)
19 January 2019; 15:30	A. Al-Abbas 9	(20–14)	Ferreira 8	Royal Arena, Copenhagen; Attendance: 6,233; Referees: Grillo, Lenci (ARG)
19 January 2019; 15:30	2× (yellow card) 4× (suspension)	Report	3× (suspension)	Royal Arena, Copenhagen; Attendance: 6,233; Referees: Grillo, Lenci (ARG)

==== 23rd place game ====
20 January 2019; 13:00	Japan	29–32	Angola	Royal Arena, Copenhagen; Attendance: 2,952; Referees: Gasmi, Gasmi (FRA)
20 January 2019; 13:00	Doi, Watanabe 5	(14–15)	Sibo 8	Royal Arena, Copenhagen; Attendance: 2,952; Referees: Gasmi, Gasmi (FRA)
20 January 2019; 13:00	2× (yellow card) 4× (suspension)	Report	2× (yellow card) 5× (suspension)	Royal Arena, Copenhagen; Attendance: 2,952; Referees: Gasmi, Gasmi (FRA)

==== 21st place game ====
20 January 2019; 15:30	Korea	26–27	Saudi Arabia	Royal Arena, Copenhagen; Attendance: 3,523; Referees: Kolahdouzan, Mousaviannazhad (IRN)
20 January 2019; 15:30	Kang J. 4	(14–13)	Mo. Al-Salem 7	Royal Arena, Copenhagen; Attendance: 3,523; Referees: Kolahdouzan, Mousaviannazhad (IRN)
20 January 2019; 15:30	3× (suspension)	Report	3× (yellow card) 7× (suspension)	Royal Arena, Copenhagen; Attendance: 3,523; Referees: Kolahdouzan, Mousaviannazhad (IRN)

=== 17th–20th place playoffs ===
17th–20th place semifinals
19 January
Serbia	32
Bahrain	27
19 January
Austria	22
Argentina	24

17th place
20 January
Serbia	28
Argentina	30
19th place
20 January
Bahrain	27
Austria	29

==== 17th–20th place semifinals ====
19 January 2019; 18:00	Serbia	32–27	Bahrain	Royal Arena, Copenhagen; Attendance: 7,225; Referees: Gasmi, Gasmi (FRA)
19 January 2019; 18:00	V. Ilić 9	(15–17)	Al-Sayyad 9	Royal Arena, Copenhagen; Attendance: 7,225; Referees: Gasmi, Gasmi (FRA)
19 January 2019; 18:00	1× (yellow card) 6× (suspension)	Report	2× (yellow card) 7× (suspension) 2× (red card)	Royal Arena, Copenhagen; Attendance: 7,225; Referees: Gasmi, Gasmi (FRA)

19 January 2019; 20:30	Austria	22–24	Argentina	Royal Arena, Copenhagen; Attendance: 1,013; Referees: Boualloucha, Khenissi (TUN)
19 January 2019; 20:30	Frimmel 8	(12–12)	F. Fernández 6	Royal Arena, Copenhagen; Attendance: 1,013; Referees: Boualloucha, Khenissi (TUN)
19 January 2019; 20:30	2× (yellow card) 5× (suspension)	Report	2× (yellow card) 2× (suspension)	Royal Arena, Copenhagen; Attendance: 1,013; Referees: Boualloucha, Khenissi (TUN)

==== 19th place game ====
20 January 2019; 18:00	Bahrain	27–29	Austria	Royal Arena, Copenhagen; Attendance: 3,624; Referees: Lah, Sok (SVN)
20 January 2019; 18:00	Al-Salatna 6	(17–17)	Weber 9	Royal Arena, Copenhagen; Attendance: 3,624; Referees: Lah, Sok (SVN)
20 January 2019; 18:00	5× (suspension)	Report	1× (yellow card) 6× (suspension)	Royal Arena, Copenhagen; Attendance: 3,624; Referees: Lah, Sok (SVN)

==== 17th place game ====
20 January 2019; 20:30	Serbia	28–30	Argentina	Royal Arena, Copenhagen; Attendance: 1,421; Referees: Gubica, Milošević (CRO)
20 January 2019; 20:30	Kukić 7	(15–13)	F. Fernández 10	Royal Arena, Copenhagen; Attendance: 1,421; Referees: Gubica, Milošević (CRO)
20 January 2019; 20:30	2× (yellow card) 7× (suspension)	Report	2× (yellow card) 6× (suspension)	Royal Arena, Copenhagen; Attendance: 1,421; Referees: Gubica, Milošević (CRO)

=== 13th–16th place playoffs ===
13th–16th place semifinals
19 January
Russia	30
North Macedonia	28
19 January
Chile	27
Qatar	37

13th place
20 January
Russia	28
Qatar	34
15th place
20 January
North Macedonia	32
Chile	30

==== 13th–16th place semifinals ====
19 January 2019; 13:00	Russia	30–28	North Macedonia	Lanxess Arena, Cologne; Attendance: 10,949; Referees: Gjeding, Hansen (DEN)
19 January 2019; 13:00	Zhitnikov 8	(17–14)	K. Lazarov 9	Lanxess Arena, Cologne; Attendance: 10,949; Referees: Gjeding, Hansen (DEN)
19 January 2019; 13:00	2× (suspension)	Report		Lanxess Arena, Cologne; Attendance: 10,949; Referees: Gjeding, Hansen (DEN)

19 January 2019; 15:30	Chile	27–37	Qatar	Lanxess Arena, Cologne; Attendance: 13,267; Referees: Pavićević, Ražnatović (MNE)
19 January 2019; 15:30	Er. Feuchtmann 7	(11–21)	Benali 8	Lanxess Arena, Cologne; Attendance: 13,267; Referees: Pavićević, Ražnatović (MNE)
19 January 2019; 15:30	3× (yellow card) 1× (suspension)	Report	1× (yellow card) 3× (suspension)	Lanxess Arena, Cologne; Attendance: 13,267; Referees: Pavićević, Ražnatović (MNE)

==== 15th place game ====
20 January 2019; 13:00	North Macedonia	32–30	Chile	Lanxess Arena, Cologne; Attendance: 9,473; Referees: Brunner (SUI), Ražnatović (MNE)
20 January 2019; 13:00	K. Lazarov 9	(16–16)	Er. Feuchtmann 9	Lanxess Arena, Cologne; Attendance: 9,473; Referees: Brunner (SUI), Ražnatović (MNE)
20 January 2019; 13:00	1× (yellow card) 4× (suspension)	Report	3× (yellow card) 5× (suspension)	Lanxess Arena, Cologne; Attendance: 9,473; Referees: Brunner (SUI), Ražnatović (MNE)

==== 13th place game ====
20 January 2019; 15:30	Russia	28–34	Qatar	Lanxess Arena, Cologne; Attendance: 12,781; Referees: Salah (SUI), Pavićević (MNE)
20 January 2019; 15:30	Kovalyov 9	(14–17)	Benali, Frankis 8	Lanxess Arena, Cologne; Attendance: 12,781; Referees: Salah (SUI), Pavićević (MNE)
20 January 2019; 15:30	2× (yellow card) 7× (suspension) 1× (red card)	Report	1× (yellow card) 6× (suspension) 1× (red card)	Lanxess Arena, Cologne; Attendance: 12,781; Referees: Salah (SUI), Pavićević (MNE)

== Main round ==
Points obtained against qualified teams from the same group were carried over.

=== Group I ===
Pos	Team	Pld	W	D	L	GF	GA	GD	Pts	Qualification
1	Germany (H)	5	4	1	0	136	116	+20	9	Semifinals
2	France	5	3	1	1	133	122	+11	7	Semifinals
3	Croatia	5	3	0	2	124	117	+7	6	Fifth place game
4	Spain	5	2	0	3	147	136	+11	4 (Note: Spain 36–24 Brazil)	Seventh place game
5	Brazil	5	2	0	3	128	149	−21	4	
6	Iceland	5	0	0	5	122	150	−28	0	

Source: IHF
Rules for classification: 1) points; 2) head-to-head points; 3) head-to-head goal difference; 4) head-to-head number of goals scored; 5) goal difference.
(H) Hosts
Notes:

19 January 2019; 18:00	France	33–30	Spain	Lanxess Arena, Cologne; Attendance: 18,121; Referees: Jørum, Kleven (NOR)
19 January 2019; 18:00	Fabregas, Mem 6	(17–15)	Solé 11	Lanxess Arena, Cologne; Attendance: 18,121; Referees: Jørum, Kleven (NOR)
19 January 2019; 18:00	1× (yellow card) 4× (suspension)	Report	3× (yellow card) 4× (suspension)	Lanxess Arena, Cologne; Attendance: 18,121; Referees: Jørum, Kleven (NOR)

19 January 2019; 20:30	Germany	24–19	Iceland	Lanxess Arena, Cologne; Attendance: 19,250; Referees: Horáček, Novotný (CZE)
19 January 2019; 20:30	Fäth 6	(14–10)	Gunnarsson 6	Lanxess Arena, Cologne; Attendance: 19,250; Referees: Horáček, Novotný (CZE)
19 January 2019; 20:30	1× (yellow card) 3× (suspension)	Report	1× (yellow card) 6× (suspension)	Lanxess Arena, Cologne; Attendance: 19,250; Referees: Horáček, Novotný (CZE)

20 January 2019; 18:00	Brazil	29–26	Croatia	Lanxess Arena, Cologne; Attendance: 15,227; Referees: Jørum, Kleven (NOR)
20 January 2019; 18:00	Langaro 9	(17–13)	Duvnjak 6	Lanxess Arena, Cologne; Attendance: 15,227; Referees: Jørum, Kleven (NOR)
20 January 2019; 18:00	2× (yellow card) 4× (suspension)	Report	1× (yellow card) 2× (suspension)	Lanxess Arena, Cologne; Attendance: 15,227; Referees: Jørum, Kleven (NOR)

20 January 2019; 20:30	Iceland	22–31	France	Lanxess Arena, Cologne; Attendance: 18,587; Referees: Kurtagic, Wetterwik (SWE)
20 January 2019; 20:30	Jónsson 5	(11–15)	Porte, Richardson 5	Lanxess Arena, Cologne; Attendance: 18,587; Referees: Kurtagic, Wetterwik (SWE)
20 January 2019; 20:30	1× (yellow card) 2× (suspension)	Report	1× (yellow card) 5× (suspension)	Lanxess Arena, Cologne; Attendance: 18,587; Referees: Kurtagic, Wetterwik (SWE)

21 January 2019; 18:00	Spain	36–24	Brazil	Lanxess Arena, Cologne; Attendance: 17,209; Referees: Pavićević, Ražnatović (MNE)
21 January 2019; 18:00	Ariño, Solé 6	(19–13)	Langaro, Nantes 4	Lanxess Arena, Cologne; Attendance: 17,209; Referees: Pavićević, Ražnatović (MNE)
21 January 2019; 18:00	1× (yellow card) 3× (suspension)	Report	2× (yellow card) 2× (suspension)	Lanxess Arena, Cologne; Attendance: 17,209; Referees: Pavićević, Ražnatović (MNE)

21 January 2019; 20:30	Croatia	21–22	Germany	Lanxess Arena, Cologne; Attendance: 19,250; Referees: Gjeding, Hansen (DEN)
21 January 2019; 20:30	Karačić, Štrlek 4	(11–11)	Wiede 6	Lanxess Arena, Cologne; Attendance: 19,250; Referees: Gjeding, Hansen (DEN)
21 January 2019; 20:30	2× (yellow card) 4× (suspension)	Report	2× (yellow card) 5× (suspension)	Lanxess Arena, Cologne; Attendance: 19,250; Referees: Gjeding, Hansen (DEN)

23 January 2019; 15:30	Brazil	32–29	Iceland	Lanxess Arena, Cologne; Attendance: 11,027; Referees: Jørum, Kleven (NOR)
23 January 2019; 15:30	Langaro 9	(15–15)	Jónsson 7	Lanxess Arena, Cologne; Attendance: 11,027; Referees: Jørum, Kleven (NOR)
23 January 2019; 15:30	1× (yellow card) 3× (suspension)	Report	1× (yellow card) 2× (suspension)	Lanxess Arena, Cologne; Attendance: 11,027; Referees: Jørum, Kleven (NOR)

23 January 2019; 18:00	France	20–23	Croatia	Lanxess Arena, Cologne; Attendance: 17,191; Referees: Horáček, Novotný (CZE)
23 January 2019; 18:00	Richardson 5	(11–11)	Horvat 7	Lanxess Arena, Cologne; Attendance: 17,191; Referees: Horáček, Novotný (CZE)
23 January 2019; 18:00	1× (suspension)	Report	1× (yellow card) 2× (suspension)	Lanxess Arena, Cologne; Attendance: 17,191; Referees: Horáček, Novotný (CZE)

23 January 2019; 20:30	Germany	31–30	Spain	Lanxess Arena, Cologne; Attendance: 19,250; Referees: Kurtagic, Wetterwik (SWE)
23 January 2019; 20:30	Böhm 5	(17–16)	Solé 8	Lanxess Arena, Cologne; Attendance: 19,250; Referees: Kurtagic, Wetterwik (SWE)
23 January 2019; 20:30	2× (yellow card) 3× (suspension)	Report	1× (yellow card) 3× (suspension)	Lanxess Arena, Cologne; Attendance: 19,250; Referees: Kurtagic, Wetterwik (SWE)

=== Group II ===
Pos	Team	Pld	W	D	L	GF	GA	GD	Pts	Qualification
1	Denmark (H)	5	5	0	0	147	116	+31	10	Semifinals
2	Norway	5	4	0	1	157	135	+22	8	Semifinals
3	Sweden	5	3	0	2	148	137	+11	6	Fifth place game
4	Egypt	5	1	1	3	132	138	−6	3 (Note: Hungary 30–30 Egypt)	Seventh place game
5	Hungary	5	1	1	3	134	144	−10	3	
6	Tunisia	5	0	0	5	113	161	−48	0	

Source: IHF
Rules for classification: 1) points; 2) head-to-head points; 3) head-to-head goal difference; 4) head-to-head number of goals scored; 5) goal difference.
(H) Hosts
Notes:

19 January 2019; 18:00	Tunisia	23–35	Sweden	Jyske Bank Boxen, Herning; Attendance: 14,153; Referees: Nachevski, Nikolov (MKD)
19 January 2019; 18:00	Sanaï 6	(14–19)	Ekberg, A. Nilsson 7	Jyske Bank Boxen, Herning; Attendance: 14,153; Referees: Nachevski, Nikolov (MKD)
19 January 2019; 18:00	2× (yellow card) 2× (suspension)	Report	1× (yellow card) 3× (suspension)	Jyske Bank Boxen, Herning; Attendance: 14,153; Referees: Nachevski, Nikolov (MKD)

19 January 2019; 20:30	Denmark	25–22	Hungary	Jyske Bank Boxen, Herning; Attendance: 15,001; Referees: Schulze, Tönnies (GER)
19 January 2019; 20:30	M. Hansen 7	(15–10)	Szita 5	Jyske Bank Boxen, Herning; Attendance: 15,001; Referees: Schulze, Tönnies (GER)
19 January 2019; 20:30	1× (yellow card) 6× (suspension)	Report	2× (yellow card) 4× (suspension)	Jyske Bank Boxen, Herning; Attendance: 15,001; Referees: Schulze, Tönnies (GER)

20 January 2019; 18:00	Hungary	26–21	Tunisia	Jyske Bank Boxen, Herning; Attendance: 2,605; Referees: Santos, Fonseca (POR)
20 January 2019; 18:00	Balogh 9	(16–14)	Boughanmi, Sanaï 5	Jyske Bank Boxen, Herning; Attendance: 2,605; Referees: Santos, Fonseca (POR)
20 January 2019; 18:00	1× (yellow card) 6× (suspension)	Report	3× (yellow card) 6× (suspension)	Jyske Bank Boxen, Herning; Attendance: 2,605; Referees: Santos, Fonseca (POR)

20 January 2019; 20:30	Norway	32–28	Egypt	Jyske Bank Boxen, Herning; Attendance: 3,643; Referees: López, Ramírez (ESP)
20 January 2019; 20:30	Rød, Sagosen 10	(16–14)	El-Ahmar, Sanad 4	Jyske Bank Boxen, Herning; Attendance: 3,643; Referees: López, Ramírez (ESP)
20 January 2019; 20:30	1× (yellow card) 4× (suspension)	Report	1× (yellow card) 5× (suspension) 1× (red card)	Jyske Bank Boxen, Herning; Attendance: 3,643; Referees: López, Ramírez (ESP)

21 January 2019; 18:00	Sweden	27–30	Norway	Jyske Bank Boxen, Herning; Attendance: 11,600; Referees: Santos, Fonseca (POR)
21 January 2019; 18:00	A. Nilsson, Wanne 5	(14–17)	Jøndal 11	Jyske Bank Boxen, Herning; Attendance: 11,600; Referees: Santos, Fonseca (POR)
21 January 2019; 18:00	2× (yellow card) 5× (suspension)	Report	3× (yellow card) 6× (suspension) 1× (red card)	Jyske Bank Boxen, Herning; Attendance: 11,600; Referees: Santos, Fonseca (POR)

21 January 2019; 20:30	Egypt	20–26	Denmark	Jyske Bank Boxen, Herning; Attendance: 13,237; Referees: Gubica, Milošević (CRO)
21 January 2019; 20:30	Zein 6	(7–9)	M. Hansen, Zachariassen 5	Jyske Bank Boxen, Herning; Attendance: 13,237; Referees: Gubica, Milošević (CRO)
21 January 2019; 20:30	3× (yellow card) 4× (suspension)	Report	2× (yellow card) 5× (suspension)	Jyske Bank Boxen, Herning; Attendance: 13,237; Referees: Gubica, Milošević (CRO)

23 January 2019; 15:30	Tunisia	23–30	Egypt	Jyske Bank Boxen, Herning; Attendance: 4,924; Referees: Nachevski, Nikolov (MKD)
23 January 2019; 15:30	Boughanmi 6	(10–15)	Omar 7	Jyske Bank Boxen, Herning; Attendance: 4,924; Referees: Nachevski, Nikolov (MKD)
23 January 2019; 15:30	3× (yellow card) 3× (suspension)	Report	1× (yellow card) 3× (suspension)	Jyske Bank Boxen, Herning; Attendance: 4,924; Referees: Nachevski, Nikolov (MKD)

23 January 2019; 18:00	Norway	35–26	Hungary	Jyske Bank Boxen, Herning; Attendance: 13,815; Referees: Schulze, Tönnies (GER)
23 January 2019; 18:00	Jøndal, Rød 7	(16–13)	Balogh 11	Jyske Bank Boxen, Herning; Attendance: 13,815; Referees: Schulze, Tönnies (GER)
23 January 2019; 18:00	1× (yellow card) 4× (suspension)	Report	1× (yellow card) 4× (suspension)	Jyske Bank Boxen, Herning; Attendance: 13,815; Referees: Schulze, Tönnies (GER)

23 January 2019; 20:30	Denmark	30–26	Sweden	Jyske Bank Boxen, Herning; Attendance: 15,002; Referees: López, Ramírez (ESP)
23 January 2019; 20:30	M. Hansen 6	(13–13)	Tollbring 8	Jyske Bank Boxen, Herning; Attendance: 15,002; Referees: López, Ramírez (ESP)
23 January 2019; 20:30	2× (yellow card) 4× (suspension)	Report	1× (yellow card) 4× (suspension)	Jyske Bank Boxen, Herning; Attendance: 15,002; Referees: López, Ramírez (ESP)

== Final round ==
=== Bracket ===
Semifinals
25 January
Germany	25
Norway	31
25 January
Denmark	38
France	30

Final
27 January
Norway	22
Denmark	31
Third place
27 January
Germany	25
France	26

=== Semifinals ===
25 January 2019; 17:30	Denmark	38–30	France	Barclaycard Arena, Hamburg; Attendance: 12,500; Referees: Gubica, Milošević (CRO)
25 January 2019; 17:30	M. Hansen 12	(21–15)	Mahé 8	Barclaycard Arena, Hamburg; Attendance: 12,500; Referees: Gubica, Milošević (CRO)
25 January 2019; 17:30	3× (suspension)	Report	2× (yellow card) 4× (suspension)	Barclaycard Arena, Hamburg; Attendance: 12,500; Referees: Gubica, Milošević (CRO)

25 January 2019; 20:30	Germany	25–31	Norway	Barclaycard Arena, Hamburg; Attendance: 12,500; Referees: Horáček, Novotný (CZE)
25 January 2019; 20:30	Gensheimer 7	(12–14)	Rød 7	Barclaycard Arena, Hamburg; Attendance: 12,500; Referees: Horáček, Novotný (CZE)
25 January 2019; 20:30	2× (yellow card) 7× (suspension) 1× (red card)	Report	2× (yellow card) 3× (suspension)	Barclaycard Arena, Hamburg; Attendance: 12,500; Referees: Horáček, Novotný (CZE)

=== Seventh place game ===
26 January 2019; 17:30	Spain	36–31	Egypt	Jyske Bank Boxen, Herning; Attendance: 5,318; Referees: Gjeding, Hansen (DEN)
26 January 2019; 17:30	Cañellas 9	(17–18)	El-Ahmar 7	Jyske Bank Boxen, Herning; Attendance: 5,318; Referees: Gjeding, Hansen (DEN)
26 January 2019; 17:30	1× (yellow card) 3× (suspension)	Report	1× (yellow card) 3× (suspension) 1× (red card)	Jyske Bank Boxen, Herning; Attendance: 5,318; Referees: Gjeding, Hansen (DEN)

=== Fifth place game ===
26 January 2019; 20:30	Croatia	28–34	Sweden	Jyske Bank Boxen, Herning; Attendance: 6,075; Referees: Schulze, Tönnies (GER)
26 January 2019; 20:30	Stepančić 5	(13–16)	Ekberg 6	Jyske Bank Boxen, Herning; Attendance: 6,075; Referees: Schulze, Tönnies (GER)
26 January 2019; 20:30	2× (yellow card) 3× (suspension)	Report	2× (yellow card) 2× (suspension)	Jyske Bank Boxen, Herning; Attendance: 6,075; Referees: Schulze, Tönnies (GER)

=== Third place game ===
27 January 2019; 14:30	Germany	25–26	France	Jyske Bank Boxen, Herning; Attendance: 14,121; Referees: Santos, Fonseca (POR)
27 January 2019; 14:30	Gensheimer 7	(13–9)	Mahé 7	Jyske Bank Boxen, Herning; Attendance: 14,121; Referees: Santos, Fonseca (POR)
27 January 2019; 14:30	2× (yellow card) 6× (suspension) 1× (red card)	Report	3× (yellow card) 4× (suspension)	Jyske Bank Boxen, Herning; Attendance: 14,121; Referees: Santos, Fonseca (POR)

=== Final ===
27 January 2019; 17:30	Norway	22–31	Denmark	Jyske Bank Boxen, Herning; Attendance: 15,003; Referees: Gubica, Milošević (CRO)
27 January 2019; 17:30	Jøndal 9	(11–18)	M. Hansen 7	Jyske Bank Boxen, Herning; Attendance: 15,003; Referees: Gubica, Milošević (CRO)
27 January 2019; 17:30	1× (yellow card) 3× (suspension)	Report	1× (yellow card) 3× (suspension)	Jyske Bank Boxen, Herning; Attendance: 15,003; Referees: Gubica, Milošević (CRO)

== Final ranking ==
Places 1–8 and 13–24 were decided by play–off or knock–out. Teams finishing fifth in the main round are ranked 9th to 10th and teams ranked sixth are ranked 11th and 12th. In case of a tie in points gained, the goal difference of the preliminary round were taken into account.

Rank	Team
1st place, gold medalist(s)	Denmark
2nd place, silver medalist(s)	Norway
3rd place, bronze medalist(s)	France
4	Germany
5	Sweden
6	Croatia
7	Spain
8	Egypt
9	Brazil
10	Hungary
11	Iceland
12	Tunisia
13	Qatar
14	Russia
15	Macedonia
16	Chile
17	Argentina
18	Serbia
19	Austria
20	Bahrain
21	Saudi Arabia
22	Korea
23	Angola
24	Japan

Qualified for the 2020 Summer Olympics and the 2021 World Men's Handball Championship
Qualified for the Olympic Qualification Tournament

2019 Men's World Champions

Denmark
First title

Team roster

Jannick Green, Simon Hald, Henrik Toft Hansen, Jóhan Hansen, Lasse Svan Hansen, Mikkel Hansen, Rene Toft Hansen, Niklas Landin Jacobsen, Magnus Landin Jacobsen, Mads Mensah Larsen, Hans Lindberg, Nikolaj Markussen, Casper Ulrich Mortensen, Henrik Møllgaard, Nikolaj Øris Nielsen, Morten Olsen, Rasmus Lauge Schmidt, Anders Zachariassen
Head coach: Nikolaj Jacobsen

== Awards ==
=== All-Star Team ===
All-Star Team of the tournament and MVP.

Position	Player
Goalkeeper	(Denmark) Niklas Landin Jacobsen
Left wing	(Norway) Magnus Jøndal
Left back	(Norway) Sander Sagosen
Centre back	(Denmark) Rasmus Lauge Schmidt
Right back	(Germany) Fabian Wiede
Right wing	(Spain) Ferran Solé
Pivot	(Norway) Bjarte Myrhol
Most valuable player	(Denmark) Mikkel Hansen

== Statistics ==
=== Top goalscorers ===
Rank	Name	Team	Goals	Shots	%
1	Mikkel Hansen	Denmark	72	108	67
2	Magnus Jøndal	Norway	59	68	87
3	Ferran Solé	Spain	58	68	85
4	Uwe Gensheimer	Germany	56	75	75
5	Sander Sagosen	Norway	51	87	59
6	Kiril Lazarov	North Macedonia	48	74	65
7	Youssef Benali	Qatar	46	61	75
7	Erwin Feuchtmann	Chile	46	69	67
9	Rasmus Lauge Schmidt	Denmark	44	63	70
9	Kentin Mahé	France	44	64	69

Source: IHF

=== Top goalkeepers ===
Rank	Name	Team	%	Saves	Shots
1	Espen Christensen	Norway	38	51	136
1	Niklas Landin Jacobsen	Denmark	38	84	223
1	Ivan Stevanović	Croatia	38	34	90
4	Mikael Appelgren	Sweden	37	64	174
4	Borko Ristovski	North Macedonia	37	47	126
6	Andreas Palicka	Sweden	36	61	170
7	Jannick Green	Denmark	35	43	122
7	Andreas Wolff	Germany	35	79	223
9	Vincent Gérard	France	34	86	252
9	Viktor Kireyev	Russia	34	57	170

Source: IHF

== International broadcasters ==
=== Television and video streaming ===
==== Host broadcasters ====
Country	Broadcaster	Summary
Denmark	DR	All matches live on all three DR television channels, TV2, and TV2 Sport respectively. Simulcast coverage for a final match.
Denmark	TV 2	All matches live on all three DR television channels, TV2, and TV2 Sport respectively. Simulcast coverage for a final match.
Germany	ARD	Live coverage respectively for Germany matches only, with highlights of all other matches.
Germany	ZDF	Live coverage respectively for Germany matches only, with highlights of all other matches.
Germany	Eurosport	15 matches live, excluding Germany.
Germany	Sportdeutschland.TV	All matches
Germany	RTL	News report coverage for other team matches on RTL, RTL II, Nitro, VOX, and N-TV
Germany	WeltN24	News report coverage for Germany team matches only, on Welt and Sky Sport News.
Germany	Sky	News report coverage for Germany team matches only, on Welt and Sky Sport News.

==== Other broadcasters ====
Country/Region	Broadcaster	Summary
Worldwide	IHF TV	All 96 matches exclusively live and free via the official IHF tournament website (unsold markets only)
Worldwide	SNTV	News report access (49 matches after Preliminary Round – online/social embargoes: France, Germany, Korea, and Scandinavia)
Argentina	Televisión Pública	Eight matches live and free (all Argentina team and a final)
Argentina	DeporTV (Argentina)	Selected matches live and free, including all Argentina team in simulcast with Televisión Pública.
Australia	Eurosport	Up to 38 matches live on Eurosport 1 (Australia, Asia-Pacific, and Poland) and Eurosport 2 (Poland only), in English language (for Australia and Asia-Pacific) and Polish language (for Poland).
Asia-Pacific: Indonesia; South Korea; Malaysia; Mongolia; Myanmar; Papua New Guinea; Philippines; Singapore; Chinese Taipei	Eurosport	Up to 38 matches live on Eurosport 1 (Australia, Asia-Pacific, and Poland) and Eurosport 2 (Poland only), in English language (for Australia and Asia-Pacific) and Polish language (for Poland).
Poland	Eurosport	Up to 38 matches live on Eurosport 1 (Australia, Asia-Pacific, and Poland) and Eurosport 2 (Poland only), in English language (for Australia and Asia-Pacific) and Polish language (for Poland).
Austria	ORF	10 matches live and free on ORF Sport +, (all Austria team, both semi-finals, and a final).
Balkan countries: Bosnia and Herzegovina; Kosovo; Macedonia; Montenegro; Serbia	Arena Sport	All 96 matches exclusively live.
Belarus	Poverkhnost	Selected matches live on Sport 1 and Sport 2.
Baltic countries: Estonia; Latvia; Lithuania	Poverkhnost	Selected matches live on Sport 1 and Sport 2.
Moldova	Poverkhnost	Selected matches live on Sport 1 and Sport 2.
Ukraine	Poverkhnost	Selected matches live on Sport 1 and Sport 2.
Bulgaria	BNT	All matches exclusively live and free on all three BNT channels.
Caribbean	DirecTV	All matches exclusively live on DirecTV Sports.
Latin American countries: Argentina; Bolivia; Chile; Colombia; Costa Rica; Cuba; Dominican Republic; Ecuador; El Salvador; Guatemala; Honduras; Mexico; Nicaragua; Panama; Paraguay; Peru; Puerto Rico; Uruguay; Venezuela	DirecTV	All matches exclusively live on DirecTV Sports.
Croatia	RTL	Selected matches live and free, including all Croatia team, both semi-finals, and a final.
Cyprus	CytaVision	All 96 matches exclusively live.
Czech Republic	Czech Television	Selected matches live and free on ČT Sport.
Egypt	ERTU	Live and free coverage on Nile Sport for Egypt matches only.
France	TF1	Live and free coverage for France matches only.
France	beIN Sports	Selected matches live, including all France team.
Georgia	Silk Sport	All 96 matches exclusively live.
Hungary	MTVA	Selected matches live and free on M4.
Iceland	RÚV	Live and free coverage for Iceland matches only.
Ireland	Premier Media Broadcasting Ltd.	9 matches, live and free on FreeSports (starting with the 6 main round matches, both semi-finals, and a final).
United Kingdom	Premier Media Broadcasting Ltd.	9 matches, live and free on FreeSports (starting with the 6 main round matches, both semi-finals, and a final).
Israel	Charlton Ltd.	Selected matches live on Sport 1 and Sport 2.
Italy	Pallamano.TV	10 selected matches exclusively live
South Korea	JTBC	10 matches live on JTBC3 Fox Sports (all Korea team, both semi-finals, and a final). Plus free coverage for highlights on JTBC3 Fox Sports YouTube channel.
Macedonia	MRT	10 matches live and free on MRT 1 (in Macedonian) and MRT 2 (in Albanian) (all Macedonia team, both semi-finals, and a final).
Mexico	Canal Once	Live coverage of final match only.
Nordic countries: Finland; Norway; Sweden	NENT	All 96 matches exclusively live on Viaplay, selected matches also available live on Viasport (excluding Sweden matches for Sweden viewers) and free on Viafree (Finland, Norway, and Sweden), with all Norway and Sweden matches live and free on TV3 (Norway and Sweden only).
Netherlands	Ziggo	Selected matches live on Ziggo Sport Totaal, also available for free on Ziggo Sport (Ziggo customers only).
Portugal	Sport TV	Selected matches live.
Romania	Telekom Sport	All 96 matches exclusively live on Telekom Sport 1, Telekom Sport 2, Telekom Sport 3 or Telekom Sport 4, and Digi Sport 1, Digi Sport 2, Digi Sport 3 or Digi Sport 4.
Romania	Digi Sport	All 96 matches exclusively live on Telekom Sport 1, Telekom Sport 2, Telekom Sport 3 or Telekom Sport 4, and Digi Sport 1, Digi Sport 2, Digi Sport 3 or Digi Sport 4.
Russia	Match TV	Selected matches live, including all Russia team.
Saudi Arabia	SBC	
Serbia	RTS	10 matches live and free (all Serbia teams, both semi-finals, and a final).
Slovakia	Pragosport	Selected matches live.
Slovenia	Šport TV	Selected matches live.
Sub-Saharan Africa English language only: Angola; Botswana; Cape Verde; Eritrea; Eswatini; Ethiopia; Gambia; Ghana; Guinea-Bissau; Kenya; Lesotho; Liberia; Malawi; Mozambique; Namibia; Nigeria; Sao Tome and Principe; Sierra Leone; Somalia; South Africa; South Sudan; Sudan; Tanzania; Uganda; Zimbabwe; Zambia; Also available in French language: Benin; Burkina Faso; Burundi; Cameroon; Central African Republic; Chad; Comoros; Congo; DR Congo; Djibouti; Equatorial Guinea; Gabon; Guinea; Ivory Coast; Madagascar; Mali; Mauritania; Mauritius; Niger; Rwanda; Senegal; Seychelles; Togo	Econet Media	10 matches live on Kwesé Sports in English language, starting from Main round, including both semi-finals and a final.
	Canal+	More than 10 matches live on Canal+ Sport in French language, starting from Preliminany round, including selected main round, both semi-finals and a final.
Spain	RTVE	Selected matches live on Teledeporte, including Spain team.
Switzerland	TV24	6 matches live and free in German language.
Tunisia	ÉRTT	Live and free coverage on Tunisia 1 or Tunisia 2 for Tunisia matches only.
United States	NBC Sports	9 matches live on Olympic Channel (6 main round matches, both semi-finals, and final) and final tape-delayed on NBCSN.

=== Radio and audio streaming ===
Region	Radio
Europe	EBU
