= Magnus Jøndal =

Norwegian handball player (born 1988)

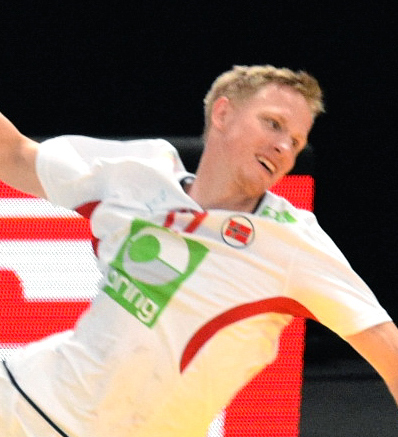
- Jøndal in 2016

Personal information
- Nationality: Norwegian
- Born: 7 February 1988 (age 38) Tomter, Norway
- Height: 1.81 m (5 ft 11 in)

Sport
- Sport: Handball
- Position: Left wing

Senior clubs
- Years: Team
- 2006–2014: Follo HK
- 2014–2016: ØIF Arendal
- 2016–2018: GOG Håndbold
- 2018–2021: SG Flensburg-Handewitt
National team
Years	Team	Apps	(Gls)
2010–2021	Norway	177	(577)
Medal record
World Championship
Silver medal – second place	2017 France
Silver medal – second place	2019 Germany/Denmark
European Championship
Bronze medal – third place	2020 Sweden/Austria/Norway

Magnus Jøndal (born 7 February 1988) is a former Norwegian handball player, who last played for SG Flensburg-Handewitt and the Norwegian national team.

He competed at the 2016 European Men's Handball Championship.

== Honours ==
- World Championship:
  - Silver: 2017, 2019
- European Championship:
  - Bronze: 2020

== Individual awards ==
- All-Star Left Wing of the World Championship: 2019
- All-Star Left Wing of the European Championship: 2020
- Håndballstatuetten 2026
