= Valčić =

Valčić may refer to:

- Anthony Valcic, Canadian musician
- Josip Valčić (born 1984), Croatian handball player
- Nevenko Valčić (1933–2007), Croatian cyclist
- Tonči Valčić (born 1978), Croatian handball player
