= Magnus Abelvik Rød =

Norwegian handball player (born 1997)

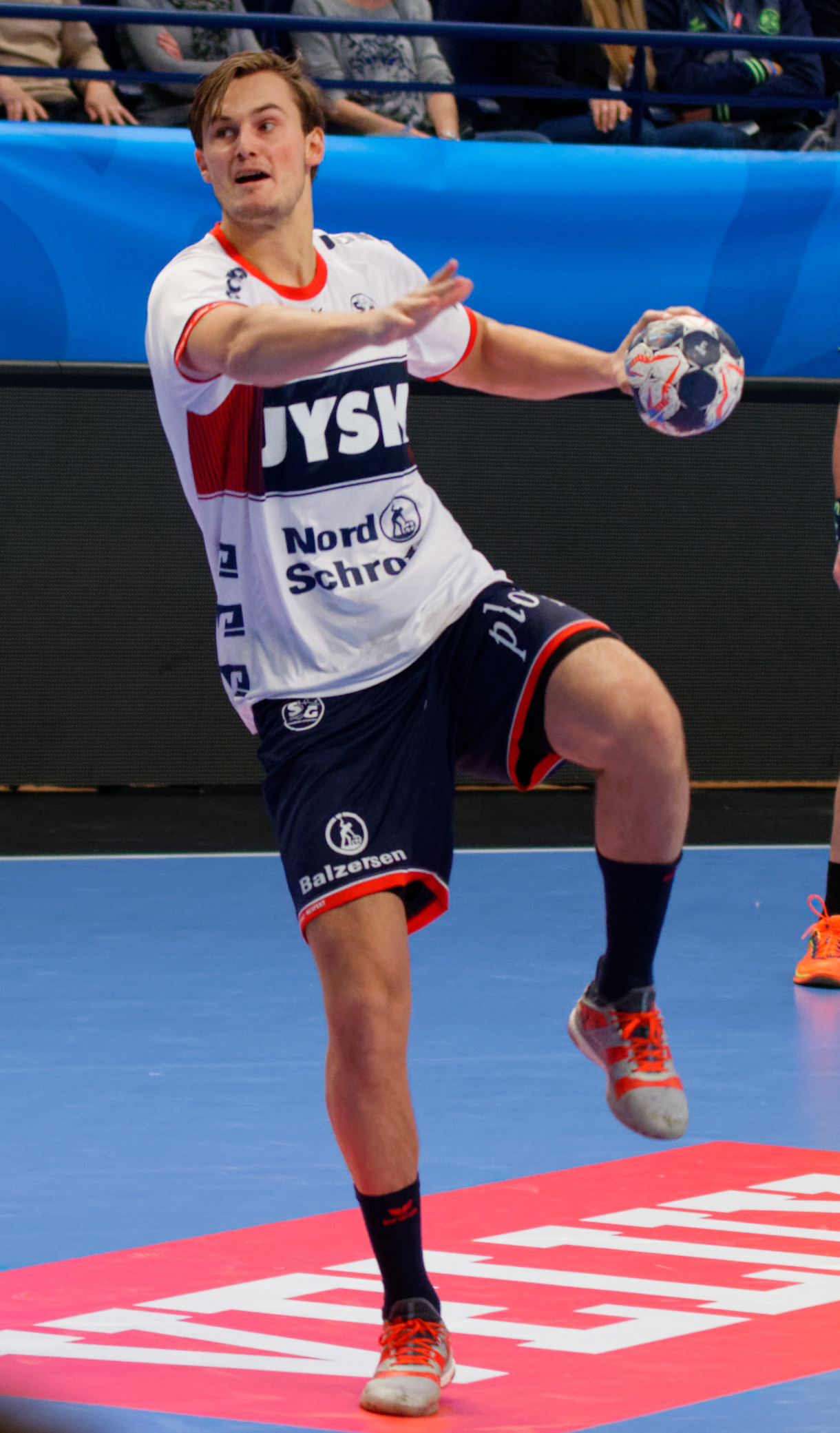

Personal information
- Nationality: Norwegian
- Born: 7 July 1997 (age 29) Oslo, Norway
- Height: 2.04 m (6 ft 8 in)

Sport
- Sport: Handball
- Position: Right back
- Current club: OTP Bank-Pick Szeged
- Number: 77

Senior clubs
- Years: Team
- 2013–2017: Bækkelagets SK
- 2017–2023: SG Flensburg-Handewitt
- 2023–2024: Kolstad Håndball
- 2024–: OTP Bank-Pick Szeged
National team
| Years | Team | Apps | (Gls) |
| 2016– | Norway | 100 | (246) |
Medal record
World Championship
| Silver medal – second place | 2017 France |
| Silver medal – second place | 2019 Germany/Denmark |
European Championship
| Bronze medal – third place | 2020 Sweden/Austria/Norway |

Magnus Abelvik Rød (born 7 July 1997 in Oslo, Norway) is a Norwegian handball player for OTP Bank-Pick Szeged and the Norwegian national team.

== Career ==
Rød Started his career at Bækkelagets SK. In December 2016 he signed a contract with German team SG Flensburg-Handewitt on a three-year deal. He extended his contract in 2018 until 2022 and again in 2019 until 2023.

With the club he won the German Handball-Bundesliga in 2018 and 2019.

Rød missed almost the entire 2021–22 season through injury.

In 2023 he moved back to Norway to join Kolstad Håndball.

A year later he joined Hungarian OTP Bank-Pick Szeged.

=== National team ===
Rød debuted for the Norwegian national team in June 2016.

He participated at the 2017 World Men's Handball Championship and the 2019 World Men's Handball Championship, where he won silver medals both times. and at the 2020 Summer Olympics.

At the 2020 European Men's Handball Championship he won bronze medals with the Norwegian team.

He missed the 2026 European Men's Handball Championship due to a foot injury.

== Honours ==
- Handball-Bundesliga:
  - Gold: 2018, 2019
- DHB-Supercup:
  - Gold: 2019
- Norwegian League:
  - Gold 2023/24
- Norwegian Cup:
  - Gold 2023/24
- Norwegian League Playoffs
  - Gold 2023/24
- Magyar Kupa
  - Gold 2024/25

== Individual awards ==
- Handball-planet: Young World Handball Player of the Year: 2019
