= Marin Šego =

Croatian handball player (born 1985)

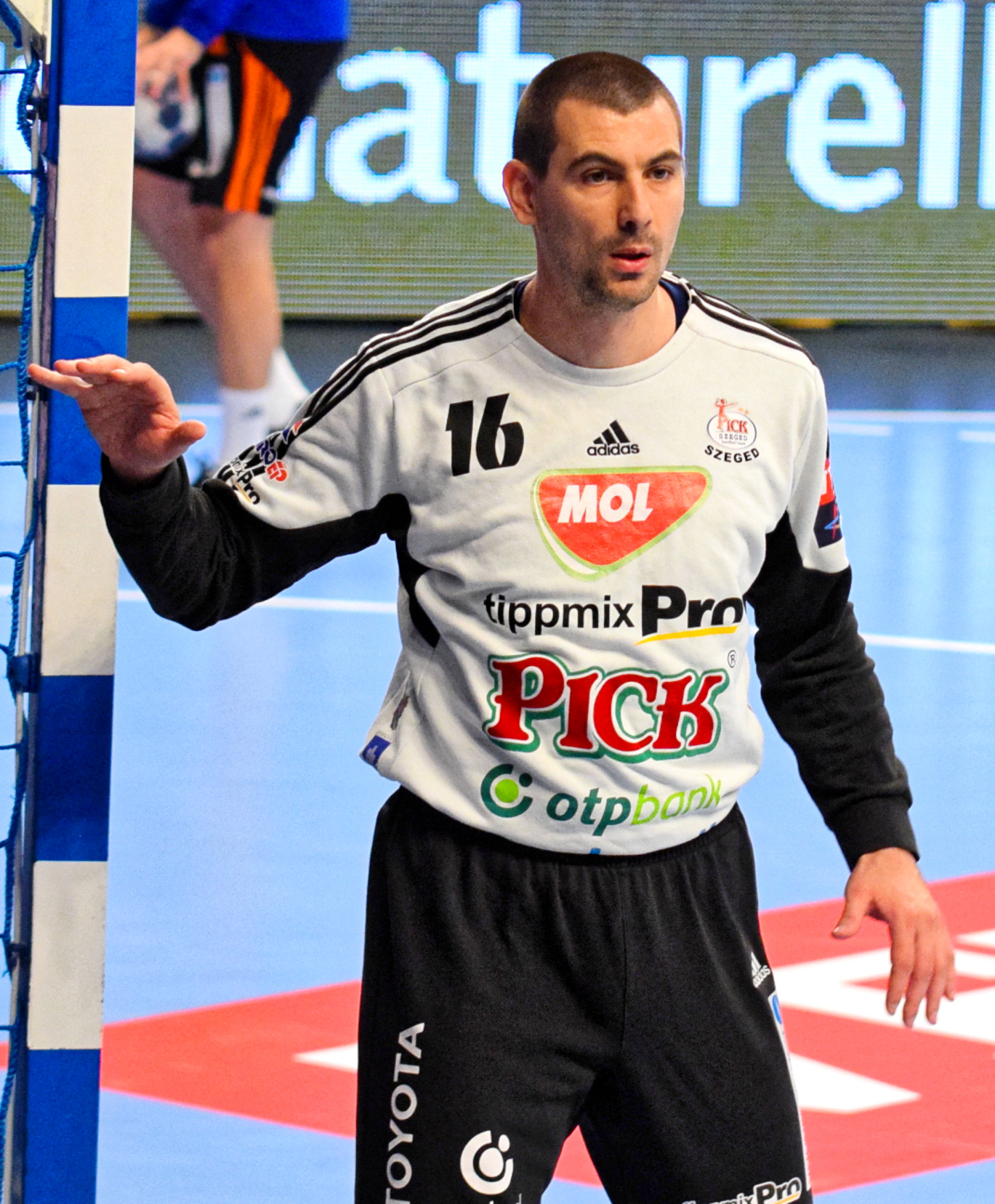
- Šego with SC Pick Szeged in 2017

Personal information
- Nationality: Croatian
- Born: 2 August 1985 (age 41) Mostar, SFR Yugoslavia
- Height: 1.98 m (6 ft 6 in)

Sport
- Sport: Handball
- Position: Goalkeeper

Senior clubs
- Years: Team
- 2002–2004: HRK Izviđač Ljubuški
- 2004–2005: Zrinjski Mostar
- 2005–2006: HRK Izviđač Ljubuški
- 2006–2008: RK Perutnina PIPO IPC
- 2008–2012: Croatia Osiguranje Zagreb
- 2012–2014: Wisła Płock
- 2014–2016: Vive Tauron Kielce
- 2016–2019: SC Pick Szeged
- 2019–2022: Montpellier Handball
- 2022–2024: Frisch Auf Göppingen
National team
Years	Team	Apps	(Gls)
2010–	Croatia	63	(2)
Medal record
European Championship
Silver medal – second place	2020 Sweden/Austria/Norway

Marin Šego (born 2 August 1985) is a retired Croatian handball player.

He participated at the 2019 World Championship and the 2020 European Championship with Croatia.

== Honours ==
Izviđač Ljubuški

- Bosnia and Herzegovina Premier League: 2003–04

Croatia Osiguranje Zagreb

- Croatian Premier League: 2008–09, 2009–10, 2010–11, 2011–12
- Croatian Cup: 2009, 2010, 2011, 2012

Vive Tauron Kielce

- Polish League: 2015, 2016
- Polish Cup: 2015, 2016
- EHF Champions League: 2015–16

Pick Szeged

- Nemzeti Bajnokság I: 2017–18
- Hungarian Cup: 2019
