= Declerck Sibo =

Angolan handball player

Personal information
- Nationality: Angolan
- Born: 19 May 1994 (age 32)
- Height: 1.92 m (6 ft 4 in)

Sport
- Sport: Handball
- Position: Pivot
- Current club: Primeiro de Agosto
- Number: 99
National team
Years	Team	Apps	(Gls)
–	Angola	28	(41)

Declerck Sibo (born 19 May 1994) is an Angolan handball player for Primeiro de Agosto and the Angolan national team.

He represented Angola at the 2019 World Men's Handball Championship.
