= Youssef Benali (handballer) =

Qatari handball player (born 1987)

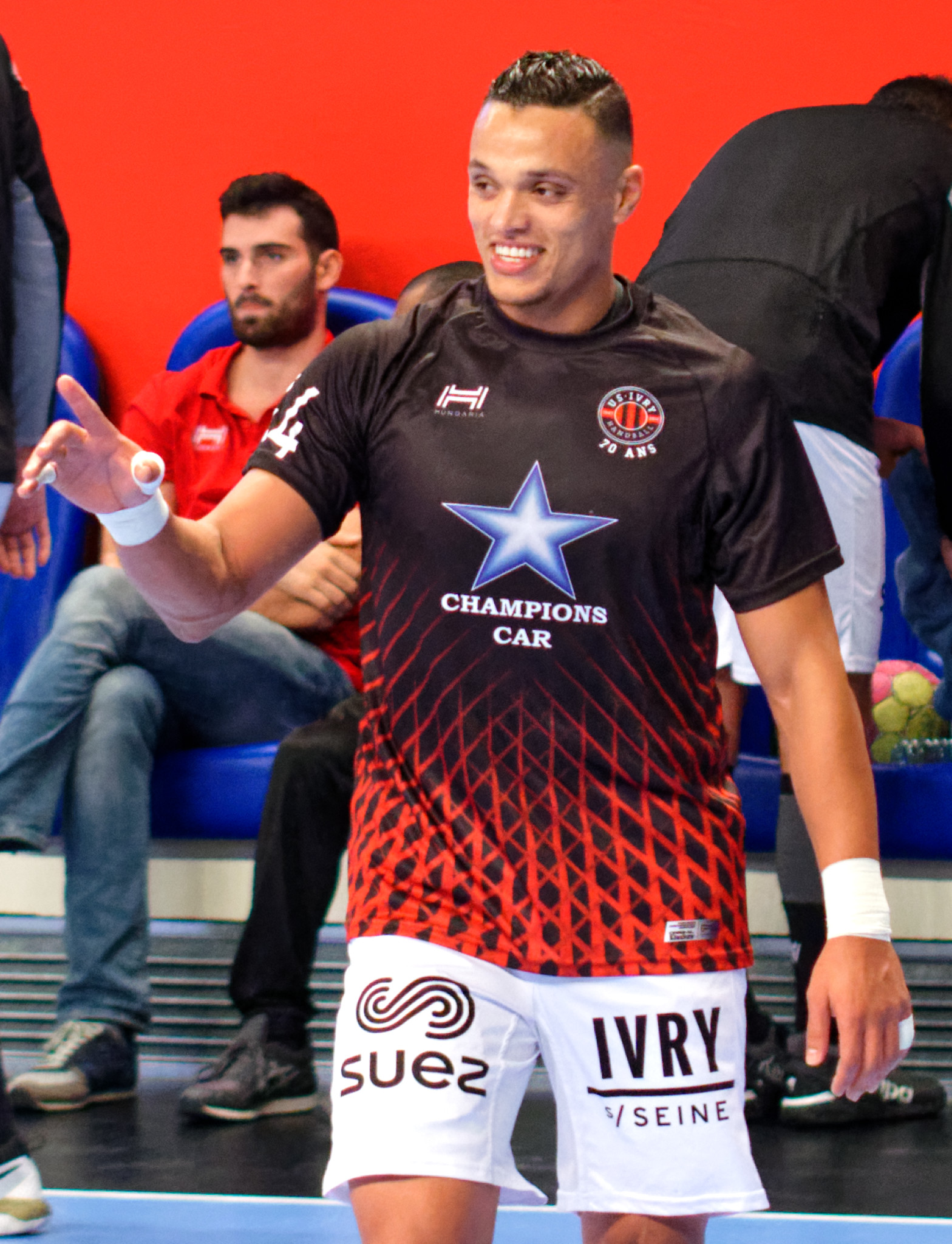
- Benali in 2017

Personal information
- Nationality: Tunisian/Qatari
- Born: 28 May 1987 (age 39) Tunis, Tunisia
- Height: 1.93 m (6 ft 4 in)

Sport
- Sport: Handball
- Position: Pivot
- Current club: Al Arabi
- Number: 41
National team
Years	Team	Apps	(Gls)
–	Qatar	63	(195)
Medal record
World Championship
Silver medal – second place	2015 Qatar
Asian Championship
Gold medal – first place	2018 South Korea
Gold medal – first place	2022 Saudi Arabia
Gold medal – first place	2024 Bahrain

Youssef Benali (born 28 May 1987) is a Tunisian-born Qatari handball player for Al Arabi and the Qatari national team.

He was part of the Qatar team that won silver medals at the 2015 World Championship in Qatar, the first World Championship medal for both Qatar and for any Asian team. The result was however controversial due to the many naturalized players of Qatar, of which Benali was one of them. According to the Frankfurter Allgemeine, only four of the 17 players in the squad were native to Qatar. The practice was criticised by Austrian goalkeeper after his team's loss to Qatar in the round of 16, saying "It [felt] like playing against a world selection team" and "I think it is not the sense of a world championship." Furthermore there were claims of favourable refereering for the hosts. After the final whistle of their semifinal against Poland, the Polish players showed their discontent by ironically applauding the three referees.
