= Ljubo Vukić =

Croatian handball player (born 1982)

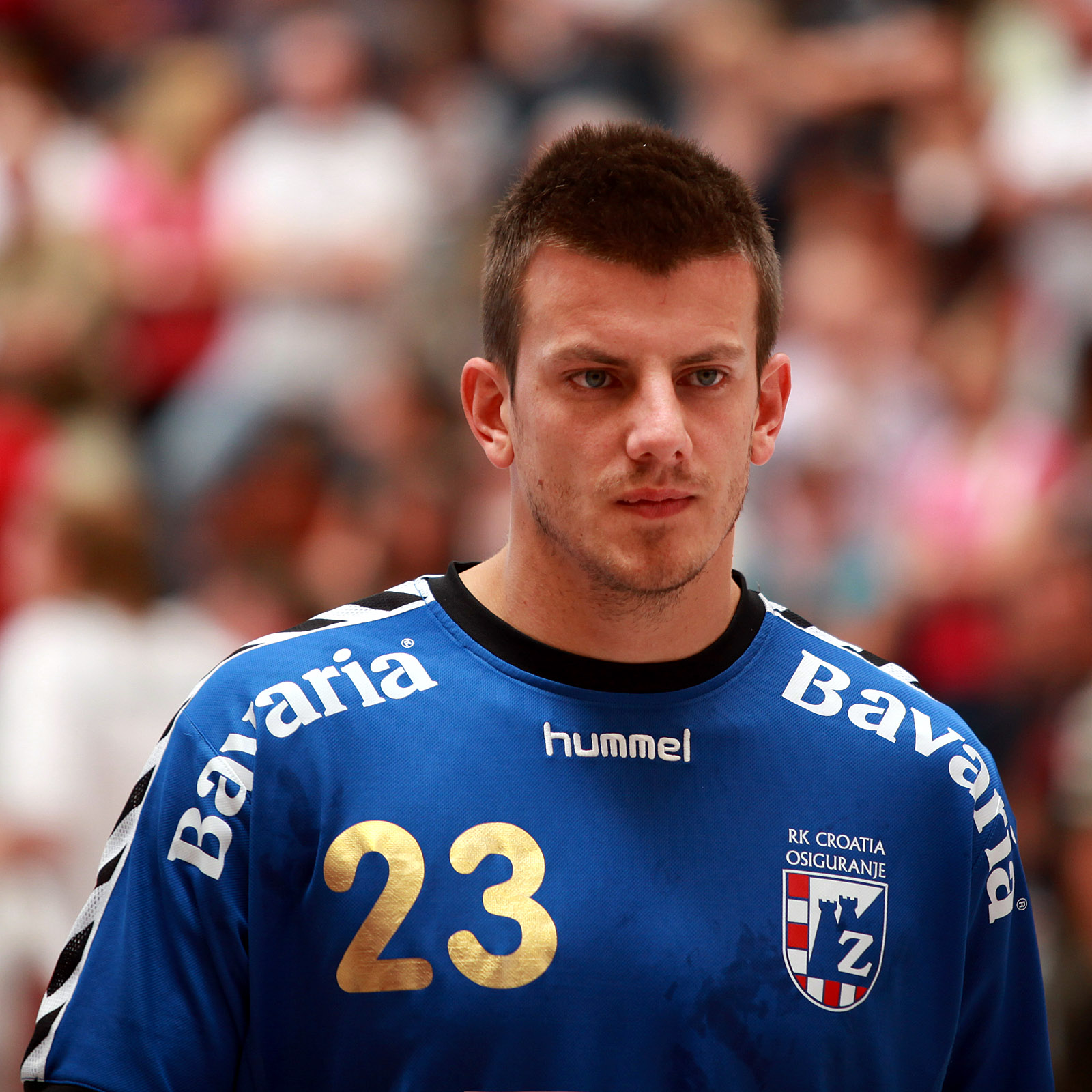
- Vukić in 2009

Medal record

Representing Croatia

Men's Handball

European Championship
Silver medal – second place	2008 Norway	Team competition

Mediterranean Games
Silver medal – second place	2005 Almería	Team competition

Ljubo Vukić (born 3 August 1982) is a Croatian handball player. Born in Split, he was a member of the Croatia men's national handball team at the 2008 Summer Olympics in Beijing, China.
