= Luka Stepančić =

Croatian handball player (born 1990)

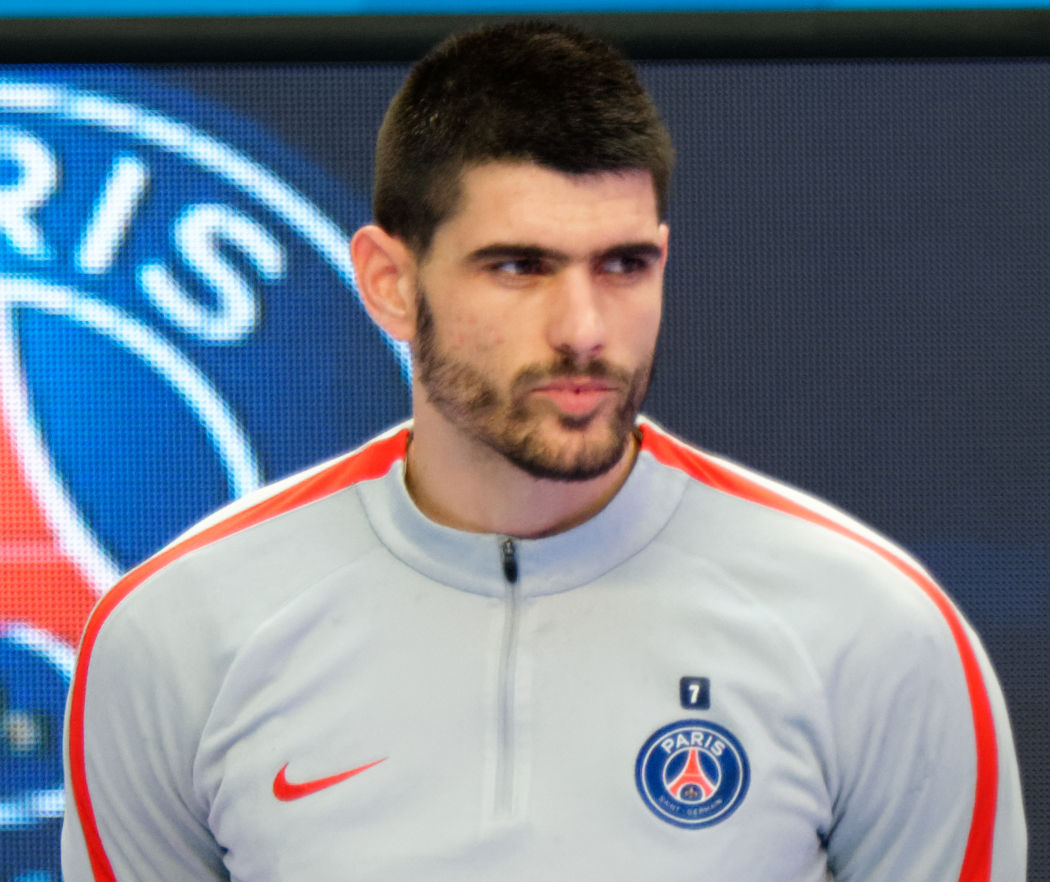
- Stepančić with Paris SG in 2017

Personal information
- Nationality: Croatian
- Born: 20 November 1990 (age 35) Pula, SR Croatia, SFR Yugoslavia
- Height: 2.03 m (6 ft 8 in)

Sport
- Sport: Handball
- Position: Right back
- Current club: Wisła Płock
- Number: 7

Senior clubs
- Years: Team
- 2010–2016: RK Zagreb
- 2016–2019: Paris Saint-Germain
- 2019–2024: OTP Bank-Pick Szeged
- 2024: Al-Arabi
- 2025: Wisła Płock
- 2025–: Győri ETO-UNI FKC
National team
Years	Team	Apps	(Gls)
2013–	Croatia	92	(241)
Medal record
World Championship
Bronze medal – third place	2013 Spain
European Championship
Silver medal – second place	2020 Sweden/Austria/Norway

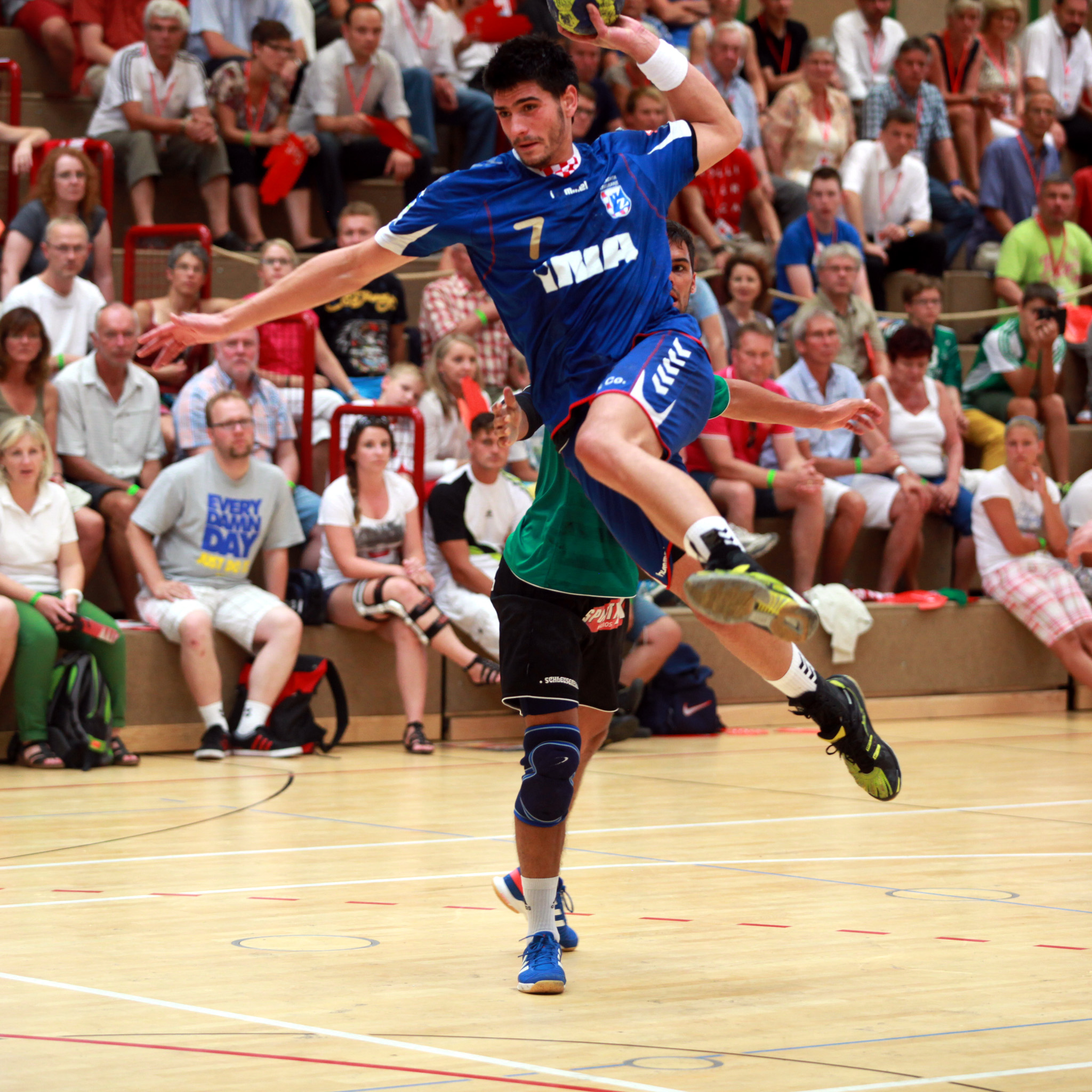
Luka Stepančić, on 18 August 2013, in Ehingen, Germany, during the Sparkassen Cup (formerly known as Schlecker Cup).

Luka Stepančić (born 20 November 1990) is a Croatian professional handball player for Wisła Płock and the Croatian national team.

Stepančić competed for Croatia in the 2013, 2015, 2017 and 2019 World Championships, as well as the 2018 and 2020 European Championships, winning the silver in 2020. He represented Croatia at the 2016 Summer Olympics.

In his club career he won everything in Croatia with RK Zagreb, and everything in France with PSG. Stepančić wasn't able to win the Champions League with PSG, losing the 2017 final to Vardar and the 2018 semifinal to Nantes.

== Biography ==
Luka Stepančić was born on November 20, 1990, in Pula, Istria, although he and his family are from Labin. His father, Franko Stepančić, is a former football player. As a boy, Stepančić played football until the 2nd grade of primary school when his cousin, a handball coach, took him to training. Stepančić then realized that handball suited him better than football.

Stepančić made his first steps with Labin club Mladi Rudar. His first coach was prof. Ratko Benazić, and later he was coached by Klaudio Brezac, Valner Franković and Zdenko Batinić.

With the young national team, Stepančić won the gold at the World Cup in 2009. For their accomplishment, Stepančić and the Junior handball team were awarded the Dražen Petrović Award in that year.

In 2007, Stepančić played for RK Zagreb and from 2009 to 2010 he played for Varteks. He then returned to PPD Zagreb. After six years at RK Zagreb, he moved to French club PSG. With PSG he won two Ligue 1 (2017, 2018), one Coupe de France (2018), two Coupes de la Ligue (2017, 2018) and one Trophée des Champions (2016). He also took part in the Velux EHF Champions League Final4, with two podium finishes. Although PSG invested many millions in the past few years (with an annual budget of 13 million euros in 2018) Stepančić and PSG were not able to win the Champions League. PSG lost the 2017 final to Vardar, and in 2018 they were denied the final by Nantes. Stepančić had been left without a European trophy in his second year at PSG. In 2019 he moved to SC Pick Szeged.

According to HandNews' selection of 2012, Stepančić was one of the ten best young players under 22 in the Champions League in 2012.

The sports editorial staff of Jutarnji list added him to the list of athletes "who will make us happy in 2013." The list also included Dario Šarić, Blanka Vlašić, Robert Kišerlovski, Marin Čilić and Sandra Perković.

In 2013, Stepančić joined the national team for the World Cup held in Spain, winning the bronze medal.

In 2015, he participated to the 2015 World Men's Handball Championship with Croatia. In the same year, Stepančić started professional studies to become a handball coach at the Faculty of Kinesiology in Split.

Stepančić represented Croatia at the 2016 Summer Olympics. He was the top scorer in the match Croatia lost to Poland in the quarter finals, thus being knocked out of the tournament.

In 2018, Stepančić finished fifth with Croatia at the 2018 European Men's Handball Championship. With 24 goals, he was Croatia's second top scorer after Manuel Štrlek (29).

In 2019 he joined the national team for the 2019 World Men's Handball Championship in Germany and Denmark. He was Croatia's top scorer in the inaugural match against Iceland, in which he was also named man of the match, receiving the award from Niko Kovač, and in the Fifth place game that Croatia lost to Sweden. Overall, Stepančić was Croatia's second top scorer in the competition with 31 goals after Zlatko Horvat with 39. Croatia ended the competition 6th, after losing the Fifth place game to Sweden on January 26, 2019.

In 2020, Stepančić took part with the Croatian national team to the 2020 European Men's Handball Championship. He played all matches, and with 31 goals was Croatia's third top scorer in the competition. Croatia ended the completion 2nd, winning the silver.

In 2020, Stepančić underwent surgery on his right ankle. Gol.hr reported that initially the player thought he could avoid surgery, but the pain was unbearable, so surgery became the best option. In 2020, Jabuka TV reported that "the great right winger could miss the World Cup in Egypt in January next year due to his long recovery." Stepančić wasn't able to recover in time, and did not participate to the 2021 World Men's Handball Championship. Stepančić's absence due to injury, together with those of Igor Karačić and Marin Šego, put coach Červar and the Croatian national team in trouble. Croatia was knocked out in the second round at the 2021 World Championship.

== Personal life ==
In 2015, Stepančić married communication scientist Ana Jurković, with whom he had been in a long-term relationship. The couple first got married in front of a registrar, and in 2016 repeated their marriage vows in a church in Zagreb, on the occasion of the baptism of their nine-month-old son Jakov.

Stepančić and Jurković met when a friend of Stepančić went to the cinema with Ana, who was a friend of his friend's girlfriend, and asked Luka if he wanted to join them. Ana, like Luka, played sports, and she used to be a basketball player.

== Honours ==
RK Zagreb

- Dukat Premier League: 2007–08, 2008–09, 2009–10, 2010–11, 2011–12, 2012–13, 2013–14, 2014–15, 2015–16
- Croatian Cup: 2008, 2009, 2010, 2011, 2012, 2013, 2014, 2015, 2016
- SEHA League: 2012–13

PSG

- LNH Division 1: 2016–17, 2017–18
- Coupe de la Ligue: 2017, 2018
- Trophée des Champions: 2016
- EHF Champions League: 2016–17 runner-up
