= 2017 World Men's Handball Championship squads =

This article displays the squads for the 2017 World Men's Handball Championship. Each team consisted of 16 players.

Age, caps and goals correct as of 11 January 2017.

== Group A ==
=== Brazil ===
The squad was announced on 22 December 2016.

Head coach: Washington Nunes

No.	Pos.	Name	Date of birth (age)	Height	App.	Goals	Club
1	GK	Maik dos Santos	6 September 1980 (aged 36)	1.80 m	212	6	(Qatar) Al-Rayan
2	CB	Henrique Teixeira	27 February 1989 (aged 27)	1.92 m	104	155	(Spain) BM Huesca
4	CB	João Pedro Silva	29 January 1994 (aged 22)	1.90 m	53	114	(France) Chambéry Savoie
6	LW	Guilherme Torriani	6 February 1999 (aged 17)	1.86 m	0	0	(Brazil) HC Taubaté
9	RW	Lucas Cândido	19 March 1989 (aged 27)	1.85 m	67	110	(Spain) Ciudad de Guadalajara
10	RB	José Toledo	11 January 1994 (aged 23)	1.93 m	55	137	(Poland) Wisła Płock
14	LB	Thiagus dos Santos	25 January 1989 (aged 27)	1.98 m	110	182	(Hungary) MOL-Pick Szeged
17	P	Alexandro Pozzer	21 December 1988 (aged 28)	1.92 m	73	97	(Spain) Puerto Sagunto
19	RW	Fábio Chiuffa	10 March 1989 (aged 27)	1.87 m	110	246	(Denmark) KIF Kolding København
26	RB	Oswaldo Guimarães	23 October 1989 (aged 27)	1.83 m	49	74	(Spain) SCDR Anaitasuna
28	RB	Gabriel Ceretta	12 June 1997 (aged 19)	1.97 m	3	6	(Spain) FC Barcelona
31	P	Rogério Moraes	11 January 1994 (aged 23)	2.04 m	17	29	(North Macedonia) HC Vardar
32	LW	Cleryston Novais	15 October 1992 (aged 24)	1.80 m	10	5	(Brazil) AD Juiz de Fora
35	LB	Thiago Ponciano	8 May 1994 (aged 22)	1.93 m	3	0	(Spain) Ciudad Encantada
37	LB	Haniel Langaro	7 March 1995 (aged 21)	1.97 m	29	55	(Spain) Ciudad de Logroño
44	CB	Leonardo Dutra	29 March 1996 (aged 20)	1.84 m	0	0	(Brazil) EC Pinheiros
89	GK	César Almeida	6 January 1989 (aged 28)	1.87 m	66	1	(Norway) ØIF Arendal

=== France ===
A 21-player squad was announced on 9 December 2016. The final squad was revealed on 10 January 2017.

Head coach: Didier Dinart/Guillaume Gille

No.	Pos.	Name	Date of birth (age)	Height	App.	Goals	Club
5	RB	Nedim Remili	18 July 1995 (aged 21)	1.95 m	14	30	(France) Paris Saint-Germain
6	LB	Olivier Nyokas	28 June 1986 (aged 30)	1.88 m	19	32	(France) HBC Nantes
8	CB	Daniel Narcisse	16 December 1979 (aged 37)	1.89 m	300	912	(France) Paris Saint-Germain
12	GK	Vincent Gérard	16 December 1986 (aged 30)	1.89 m	47	3	(France) Montpellier
13	CB	Nikola Karabatić	11 April 1984 (aged 32)	1.96 m	273	1093	(France) Paris Saint-Germain
14	LW	Kentin Mahé	22 May 1991 (aged 25)	1.86 m	63	189	(Germany) SG Flensburg-Handewitt
16	GK	Thierry Omeyer	2 November 1976 (aged 40)	1.92 m	347	4	(France) Paris Saint-Germain
17	LB	Timothey N'Guessan	18 September 1992 (aged 24)	1.96 m	38	74	(Spain) FC Barcelona
18	LB	William Accambray	8 April 1988 (aged 28)	1.94 m	90	204	(France) Paris Saint-Germain
19	RW	Luc Abalo	6 September 1984 (aged 32)	1.82 m	217	707	(France) Paris Saint-Germain
20	P	Cédric Sorhaindo	7 June 1984 (aged 32)	1.92 m	172	360	(Spain) FC Barcelona
21	LW	Michaël Guigou	28 January 1982 (aged 34)	1.79 m	237	845	(France) Montpellier
22	P	Luka Karabatić	19 April 1988 (aged 28)	2.02 m	64	75	(France) Paris Saint-Germain
23	P	Ludovic Fabregas	1 July 1996 (aged 20)	1.98 m	28	17	(France) Montpellier
27	RB	Adrien Dipanda	3 May 1988 (aged 28)	2.02 m	24	37	(France) Saint-Raphaël
28	RB	Valentin Porte	7 September 1990 (aged 26)	1.90 m	70	187	(France) Montpellier HB
32	RB	Dika Mem	31 August 1997 (aged 19)	1.94 m	2	1	(Spain) FC Barcelona

=== Japan ===
A 19-player squad was announced on 19 December 2016.

Head coach: Antonio Carlos Ortega

No.	Pos.	Name	Date of birth (age)	Height	App.	Goals	Club
5	RB	Kairi Kochi	22 January 1985 (aged 31)	1.86 m	73	178	(Japan) Toyota Auto Body
6	P	Takashi Kato	30 October 1989 (aged 27)	1.88 m	35	34	(Japan) Daido Steel
8	RW	Jin Watanabe	17 January 1990 (aged 26)	1.83 m	33	116	(Japan) Toyota Auto Body
10	P	Daichi Komuro	28 June 1988 (aged 28)	1.88 m	25	16	(Japan) Osaki Osol
12	GK	Masatake Kimura	1 May 1990 (aged 26)	1.84 m	22	0	(Japan) Osaki Osol
17	CB	Kento Uegaki	17 October 1990 (aged 26)	1.80 m	16	48	(Japan) Osaki Osol
19	RB	Shinnosuke Tokuda	6 December 1995 (aged 21)	1.78 m	8	20	(Japan) Univ. of Tsukuba
21	GK	Akihito Kai	29 April 1987 (aged 29)	1.84 m	58	0	(Japan) Toyota Auto Body
23	LW	Goki Koshio	18 September 1991 (aged 25)	1.82 m	3	7	(Japan) Toyoda Gosei
24	LB	Hiroki Shida	24 June 1989 (aged 27)	1.89 m	47	141	(Japan) Osaki Osol
25	RW	Hiroki Motoki	14 February 1992 (aged 24)	1.82 m	29	73	(Japan) Osaki Osol
27	P	Hiroyasu Tamakawa	27 April 1995 (aged 21)	1.98 m	0	0	(Japan) Kokushikan Univ.
29	CB	Yuto Agarie	6 July 1993 (aged 23)	1.83 m	9	18	(Japan) Daido Steel
30	LB	Kohei Narita	15 June 1989 (aged 27)	1.90 m	34	73	(Japan) Wakunaga Leolic
31	CB	Atsushi Mekaru	3 April 1985 (aged 31)	1.81 m	10	37	(Spain) Puente Genil
32	LW	Remi Anri Doi	28 September 1989 (aged 27)	1.81 m	8	22	(France) Chambéry Savoie
33	GK	Takayuki Shimuzu	27 August 1983 (aged 33)	1.86 m	25	0	(Japan) Wakunaga Leolic

=== Norway ===
A 17-player squad was announced on 12 December 2016. Harald Reinkind was replaced by Magnus Abelvik Rød because of an injury on 4 January 2017. On 19 January 2017, Ole Erevik was replaced by Petter Øverby.

Head coach: Christian Berge

No.	Pos.	Name	Date of birth (age)	Height	App.	Goals	Club
5	CB	Sander Sagosen	14 September 1995 (aged 21)	1.95 m	48	156	(Denmark) Aalborg Håndbold
7	P	Joakim Hykkerud	10 February 1986 (aged 30)	1.94 m	58	66	(Germany) TSV Hannover-Burgdorf
8	P	Bjarte Myrhol	29 May 1982 (aged 34)	1.92 m	192	553	(Denmark) Skjern Håndbold
9	P	Petter Øverby	26 March 1992 (aged 24)	1.94 m	39	11	(Norway) Elverum Håndball
12	GK	Ole Erevik	9 January 1981 (aged 36)	1.96 m	181	0	(France) Pays d’Aix UC
15	RB	Kent Robin Tønnesen	5 June 1991 (aged 25)	1.96 m	66	154	(Germany) Füchse Berlin
16	GK	Espen Christensen	17 June 1985 (aged 31)	1.90 m	53	0	(Denmark) GOG Håndbold
17	LW	Magnus Jøndal	7 February 1988 (aged 28)	1.87 m	89	226	(Denmark) GOG Håndbold
19	RW	Kristian Bjørnsen	10 January 1989 (aged 28)	1.91 m	66	301	(Germany) HSG Wetzlar
20	LW	André Lindboe	3 November 1988 (aged 28)	1.78 m	43	86	(Norway) Elverum Håndball
21	P	Magnus Gullerud	13 November 1991 (aged 25)	1.96 m	70	81	(Germany) GWD Minden
23	RB	Magnus Abelvik Rød	7 July 1997 (aged 19)	2.01 m	3	6	(Norway) Bækkelagets SK
24	CB	Christian O'Sullivan	22 August 1991 (aged 25)	1.90 m	61	83	(Germany) SC Magdeburg
25	RB	Eivind Tangen	4 May 1993 (aged 23)	1.95 m	33	42	(Denmark) HC Midtjylland
26	LB	Gøran Søgard Johannessen	26 April 1994 (aged 22)	1.94 m	14	23	(Denmark) GOG Håndbold
30	GK	Torbjørn Bergerud	16 July 1994 (aged 22)	1.99 m	19	0	(Denmark) Team Tvis Holstebro
89	LB	Espen Lie Hansen	1 March 1989 (aged 27)	1.96 m	111	371	(Denmark) HC Midtjylland

=== Poland ===
A 21-player squad was announced on 8 December 2016. It was reduced to 19 on 26 December 2016. Piotr Wyszomirski cancelled his participation due to an injury on 29 December 2016. On 2 January 2017, an 18-player squad was revealed after Kamil Syprzak and Michał Szyba were ruled out because of an injury. On 8 January 2017, Mariusz Jurkiewicz was ruled out because of an injury.

Head coach: Talant Duyshebaev

No.	Pos.	Name	Date of birth (age)	Height	App.	Goals	Club
2	P	Marek Daćko	29 March 1991 (aged 25)	1.98 m	5	5	(Poland) Górnik Zabrze
4	CB	Krzysztof Łyżwa	29 May 1990 (aged 26)	1.95 m	2	2	(Poland) Azoty-Puławy
5	LW	Mateusz Jachlewski	27 December 1984 (aged 32)	1.84 m	121	255	(Poland) Vive Tauron Kielce
6	LW	Przemysław Krajewski	20 January 1987 (aged 29)	1.84 m	80	158	(Poland) Azoty-Puławy
7	CB	Paweł Niewrzawa	28 September 1992 (aged 24)	1.89 m	4	2	(Poland) Wybrzeże Gdańsk
10	P	Patryk Walczak	29 July 1992 (aged 24)	1.98 m	1	2	(Poland) Vive Tauron Kielce
12	GK	Mateusz Kornecki	5 June 1994 (aged 22)	1.94 m	1	0	(Poland) Górnik Zabrze
25	RW	Arkadiusz Moryto	31 August 1997 (aged 19)	1.82 m	2	0	(Poland) Zagłębie Lubin
26	RW	Michał Daszek	27 June 1992 (aged 24)	1.80 m	69	153	(Poland) Wisła Płock
28	P	Maciej Gębala	10 January 1994 (aged 23)	2.00 m	14	7	(Poland) Wisła Płock
30	RB	Rafał Przybylski	19 February 1991 (aged 25)	1.97 m	10	14	(Poland) Azoty-Puławy
33	RB	Paweł Paczkowski	14 June 1993 (aged 23)	1.95 m	11	9	(Poland) Vive Tauron Kielce
38	CB	Łukasz Gierak	22 June 1988 (aged 28)	1.92 m	14	12	(Germany) TuS Nettelstedt-Lübbecke
48	LB	Tomasz Gębala	23 November 1995 (aged 21)	2.12 m	4	8	(Poland) Wisła Płock
49	LB	Piotr Chrapkowski	24 March 1988 (aged 28)	2.02 m	69	110	(Poland) Vive Tauron Kielce
61	GK	Adam Malcher	21 May 1986 (aged 30)	1.98 m	37	1	(Poland) Gwardia Opole
94	GK	Adam Morawski	17 October 1994 (aged 22)	1.90 m	3	0	(Poland) Wisła Płock

=== Russia ===
A 21-player squad was announced on 19 December 2016. It was reduced to 17 on 27 December 2016. More players were called up to a 21-player roster on 2 January 2017.

Head coach: Dmitri Torgovanov

No.	Pos.	Name	Date of birth (age)	Height	App.	Goals	Club
5	RB	Dmitrii Kiselev	15 November 1994 (aged 22)	1.93 m	7	9	(Russia) St. Petersburg
6	RW	Daniil Shishkarev	6 July 1988 (aged 28)	1.89 m	86	196	(North Macedonia) RK Vardar
7	RW	Dmitry Kovalyov	15 May 1982 (aged 34)	1.80 m	175	439	(Russia) Chekhovskiye Medvedi
9	CB	Alexander Shkurinskiy	11 April 1995 (aged 21)	1.90 m	5	7	(Russia) SKIF Krasnodar
10	P	Alexander Chernoivanov	13 February 1979 (aged 37)	2.05 m	116	232	(Russia) Chekhovskiye Medvedi
11	CB	Pavel Atman	25 May 1987 (aged 29)	1.90 m	107	204	(Belarus) Meshkov Brest
12	GK	Vadim Bogdanov	26 March 1986 (aged 30)	1.97 m	84	0	(Poland) Azoty-Puławy
13	LB	Sergei Gorbok	4 December 1982 (aged 34)	1.96 m	61	206	(Hungary) MOL-Pick Szeged
16	GK	Dmitry Pavlenko	1 January 1991 (aged 26)	1.90 m	17	0	(Russia) Chekhovskiye Medvedi
17	LB	Aleksandr Dereven	26 March 1992 (aged 24)	1.99 m	15	36	(North Macedonia) RK Vardar
20	P	Mikhail Chipurin	17 November 1980 (aged 36)	1.85 m	208	505	(France) Ivry Handball
21	P	Gleb Kalarash	29 November 1990 (aged 26)	2.05 m	26	39	(Ukraine) Motor Zaporizhzhia
25	RB	Sergey Shelmenko	5 April 1983 (aged 33)	1.96 m	74	160	(Ukraine) Motor Zaporizhzhia
31	LW	Timur Dibirov	30 July 1983 (aged 33)	1.80 m	175	600	(North Macedonia) RK Vardar
44	LW	Igor Soroka	27 May 1991 (aged 25)	1.80 m	29	85	(Ukraine) Motor Zaporizhzhia
55	LB	Azat Valiullin	1 September 1990 (aged 26)	2.07 m	9	1	(Germany) TBV Lemgo
87	GK	Victor Kireev	5 May 1987 (aged 29)	1.90 m	25	0	(Ukraine) Motor Zaporizhzhia
89	CB	Dmitry Zhitnikov	20 November 1989 (aged 27)	1.85 m	91	206	(Poland) Wisła Płock

== Group B ==
=== Angola ===
The squad was announced on 24 December 2016.

Head coach: Filipe Cruz

No.	Pos.	Name	Date of birth (age)	Height	App.	Goals	Club
1	GK	Julião Gaspar	28 March 1990 (aged 26)	1.90 m	5	0	(Angola) G.D. Interclube
4	P	Yaroslav Aguiar	11 June 1985 (aged 31)	2.00 m	0	0	(Angola) G.D. Interclube
5	CB	Romé Hebo	11 April 1992 (aged 24)	1.90 m	47	65	(Angola) Primeiro de Agosto
6	RB	Osvaldo Mulenessa	3 February 1986 (aged 30)	1.70 m	29	37	(Angola) Primeiro de Agosto
7	LW	Elias António	30 May 1987 (aged 29)	1.70 m	24	38	(Portugal) Atlética de Águas Santas
8	LB	Belchior Camuanga	21 August 1983 (aged 33)	1.70 m	36	85	(Angola) Primeiro de Agosto
9	CB	Adilson Maneco	2 March 1993 (aged 23)	1.70 m	32	32	(Angola) Primeiro de Agosto
11	P	Gabriel Teca	2 February 1991 (aged 25)	2.00 m	24	4	(Angola) Primeiro de Agosto
12	GK	Gilberto Figueira	25 January 1988 (aged 28)	2.00 m	5	0	(Angola) Marinha de Guerra
13	CB	Manuel Nascimento	15 March 1994 (aged 22)	1.80 m	33	83	(Angola) Marinha de Guerra
14	LW	Nestor Kinanga	23 September 1988 (aged 28)	1.70 m	0	0	(Angola) G.D. Interclube
16	GK	Giovane Muachissengue	20 February 1984 (aged 32)	1.80 m	50	0	(Angola) Primeiro de Agosto
17	LB	Sérgio Lopes	2 June 1983 (aged 33)	1.90 m	58	161	(Angola) Primeiro de Agosto
21	RW	Adelino Pestana	11 March 1992 (aged 24)	1.80 m	42	80	(Angola) G.D. Interclube
79	RW	Edvaldo Ferreira	28 May 1990 (aged 26)	2.00 m	24	103	(Tunisia) Étoile Sportive du Sahel

=== Iceland ===
A 23-player squad was announced on 28 December 2016. It was reduced to 19 on 3 January 2017. The final squad was revealed on 9 January 2017.

Head coach: Geir Sveinsson

No.	Pos.	Name	Date of birth (age)	Height	App.	Goals	Club
1	GK	Björgvin Páll Gústavsson	24 May 1985 (aged 31)	1.93 m	183	5	(Germany) Bergischer HC
3	P	Kári Kristjánsson	28 October 1984 (aged 32)	1.98 m	116	140	(Iceland) ÍBV
5	RB	Rúnar Kárason	24 May 1988 (aged 28)	1.96 m	74	163	(Germany) TSV Hannover-Burgdorf
6	RB	Ásgeir Örn Hallgrímsson	17 February 1984 (aged 32)	1.91 m	237	405	(France) USAM Nîmes
7	LB	Arnór Atlason	23 July 1984 (aged 32)	1.91 m	187	423	(Denmark) Aalborg Håndbold
9	LW	Guðjón Valur Sigurðsson	8 August 1979 (aged 37)	1.87 m	328	1727	(Germany) Rhein-Neckar Löwen
12	GK	Aron Rafn Eðvarðsson	1 September 1989 (aged 27)	2.02 m	68	4	(Germany) SG BBM Bietigheim
13	LB	Ólafur Guðmundsson	13 May 1990 (aged 26)	1.94 m	76	85	(Sweden) IFK Kristianstad
14	RW	Arnór Þór Gunnarsson	23 October 1987 (aged 29)	1.81 m	66	152	(Germany) Bergischer HC
21	P	Arnar Freyr Arnarsson	14 March 1996 (aged 20)	2.01 m	6	1	(Sweden) IFK Kristianstad
25	LW	Bjarki Már Elísson	16 May 1990 (aged 26)	1.91 m	24	50	(Germany) Füchse Berlin
26	P	Bjarki Már Gunnarsson	10 August 1988 (aged 28)	2.01 m	52	12	(Germany) EHV Aue
27	CB	Gunnar Steinn Jónsson	4 May 1987 (aged 29)	1.95 m	30	27	(Sweden) IFK Kristianstad
28	CB	Guðmundur Hólmar Helgason	5 August 1992 (aged 24)	1.92 m	19	6	(France) Cesson Rennes
30	RB	Ómar Ingi Magnússon	12 March 1997 (aged 19)	1.84 m	4	13	(Denmark) Aarhus Håndbold
33	CB	Janus Daði Smárason	1 January 1995 (aged 22)	1.84 m	5	11	(Iceland) Haukar

=== Macedonia ===
A 24-player squad was announced on 16 December 2016. It was reduced to 21 on 30 December 2016, and to 19 players on 9 January 2017.

Head coach: Lino Červar

No.	Pos.	Name	Date of birth (age)	Height	App.	Goals	Club
3	LW	Dejan Manaskov	26 August 1992 (aged 24)	1.80 m	38	117	(Germany) Rhein-Neckar Löwen
5	P	Stojanče Stoilov	30 April 1987 (aged 29)	1.92 m	32	51	(North Macedonia) RK Vardar
6	LB	Risto Arnaudovski	9 July 1981 (aged 35)	1.96 m	0	0	(Austria) SC Ferlach
7	RB	Kiril Lazarov	10 May 1980 (aged 36)	1.93 m	120	977	(Spain) FC Barcelona
8	RB	Vlatko Mitkov	16 August 1981 (aged 35)	1.92 m	91	78	(Austria) UHK Krems
10	LB	Stefan Drogrishki	9 September 1994 (aged 22)	1.93 m	2	0	(North Macedonia) Metalurg Skopje
11	LB	Filip Taleski	28 March 1996 (aged 20)	2.02 m	7	8	(Germany) Rhein-Neckar Löwen
12	GK	Kiril Kolev	18 July 1978 (aged 38)	1.96 m	0	0	(North Macedonia) RK Pelister
13	CB	Filip Mirkulovski	14 September 1983 (aged 33)	1.89 m	126	315	(Germany) HSG Wetzlar
14	LB	Velko Markoski	5 April 1986 (aged 30)	1.94 m	44	48	(Croatia) RK Zagreb
17	P	Nikola Markoski	22 May 1990 (aged 26)	1.96 m	19	10	(Hungary) Orosházi FKSE
20	GK	Blagojče Trajkovski	6 October 1986 (aged 30)	1.84 m	0	0	(North Macedonia) RK Ohrid 2013
22	RW	Goce Georgievski	12 February 1987 (aged 29)	1.85 m	43	78	(Romania) CSM București
23	LB	Filip Lazarov	21 April 1985 (aged 31)	1.97 m	47	133	(Romania) Poli Timișoara
26	LW	Goce Ojleski	10 October 1989 (aged 27)	1.88 m	27	21	(Romania) HC Odorheiu
28	RW	Martin Popovski	26 August 1994 (aged 22)	1.77 m	0	0	(North Macedonia) RK Vardar
29	LB	Marko Neloski	6 June 1996 (aged 20)	2.00 m	2	5	(North Macedonia) RK Metalurg Skopje
33	P	Žarko Peševski	11 April 1991 (aged 25)	1.95 m	11	17	(North Macedonia) RK Metalurg Skopje

=== Slovenia ===
A 21-player squad was announced on 22 December 2016. It was reduced to 17 on 4 January 2017.

Head coach: Veselin Vujović

No.	Pos.	Name	Date of birth (age)	Height	App.	Goals	Club
1	GK	Matevž Skok	2 September 1986 (aged 30)	1.88 m	63	0	(Croatia) RK Zagreb
3	P	Blaž Blagotinšek	17 January 1994 (aged 22)	2.02 m	37	39	(Hungary) MVM Veszprém
5	LB	Nik Henigman	4 December 1995 (aged 21)	1.99 m	11	13	(Slovenia) RD Ribnica
6	RW	Gašper Marguč	20 August 1990 (aged 26)	1.81 m	69	236	(Hungary) MVM Veszprém
7	RB	Vid Kavtičnik	24 May 1984 (aged 32)	1.91 m	170	480	(France) Montpellier
8	RW	Blaž Janc	20 November 1996 (aged 20)	1.87 m	14	60	(Slovenia) RK Celje
11	RB	Jure Dolenec	6 December 1988 (aged 28)	1.90 m	106	380	(France) Montpellier
13	LW	Darko Cingesar	25 July 1990 (aged 26)	1.87 m	35	55	(Croatia) RK Zagreb
15	P	Vid Poteko	5 April 1991 (aged 25)	1.94 m	34	15	(Slovenia) RK Celje
18	RB	David Miklavčič	29 January 1983 (aged 33)	1.96 m	95	140	(Croatia) RK Zagreb
20	LW	Tilen Kodrin	14 May 1994 (aged 22)	1.92 m	2	4	(Slovenia) RK Celje
22	P	Matej Gaber	22 July 1991 (aged 25)	1.97 m	95	114	(Hungary) MOL-Pick Szeged
25	CB	Marko Bezjak	26 June 1986 (aged 30)	1.85 m	90	146	(Germany) SC Magdeburg
30	LB	Jan Grebenc	18 August 1992 (aged 24)	1.94 m	2	1	(Slovenia) RD Ribnica
32	CB	Miha Zarabec	12 October 1991 (aged 25)	1.77 m	19	42	(Slovenia) RK Celje
51	LB	Borut Mačkovšek	11 September 1992 (aged 24)	2.03 m	59	120	(Slovenia) RK Celje
90	GK	Urban Lesjak	24 August 1990 (aged 26)	1.87 m	26	0	(Slovenia) RK Celje
99	GK	Urh Kastelic	27 February 1996 (aged 20)	2.01 m	0	0	(Slovenia) RK Maribor Branik

=== Spain ===
A 17-player squad was announced on 20 December 2016. It was renewed on 2 January 2017.

Head coach: Jordi Ribera

No.	Pos.	Name	Date of birth (age)	Height	App.	Goals	Club
3	RB	Eduardo Gurbindo	8 November 1987 (aged 29)	1.95 m	84	104	(France) HBC Nantes
6	LW	Ángel Fernández	16 September 1988 (aged 28)	1.92 m	6	6	(Spain) Ciudad de Logroño
7	LW	Valero Rivera	22 February 1985 (aged 31)	1.89 m	77	299	(Spain) FC Barcelona
8	RW	Víctor Tomás	15 February 1985 (aged 31)	1.78 m	162	525	(Spain) FC Barcelona
9	CB	Raul Entrerrios	12 February 1981 (aged 35)	1.93 m	216	480	(Spain) FC Barcelona
10	RB	Alex Dujshebaev	17 December 1992 (aged 24)	1.87 m	41	80	(North Macedonia) RK Vardar
11	CB	Daniel Sarmiento	25 August 1983 (aged 33)	1.86 m	72	156	(France) Saint-Raphaël
13	P	Julen Aguinagalde	8 December 1982 (aged 34)	1.95 m	149	393	(Poland) Vive Tauron Kielce
21	LB	Joan Cañellas	30 September 1986 (aged 30)	1.98 m	136	366	(North Macedonia) RK Vardar
24	LB	Viran Morros	15 December 1983 (aged 33)	1.99 m	171	149	(Spain) FC Barcelona
30	P	Gedeón Guardiola	10 January 1984 (aged 33)	2.00 m	91	117	(Germany) Rhein-Neckar Löwen
31	LB	Iosu Goñi	4 January 1990 (aged 27)	1.95 m	10	14	(France) Pays d'Aix UC
33	GK	Gonzalo Pérez de Vargas	10 January 1991 (aged 26)	1.90 m	59	0	(Spain) FC Barcelona
44	GK	Rodrigo Corrales	24 January 1991 (aged 25)	2.02 m	15	1	(Poland) Wisła Płock
53	RW	David Balaguer	17 August 1991 (aged 25)	1.85 m	0	0	(France) HBC Nantes
54	LB	Álex Costoya	6 May 1993 (aged 23)	1.93 m	0	0	(Spain) Ademar León
55	P	Adrià Figueras	31 August 1988 (aged 28)	1.92 m	2	7	(Spain) BM Granollers

=== Tunisia ===
A 19-player squad was announced on 25 December 2016.

Head coach: Hafedh Zouabi

No.	Pos.	Name	Date of birth (age)	Height	App.	Goals	Club
1	GK	Makram Missaoui	14 February 1981 (aged 35)	1.88 m	156	0	(Tunisia) Club Africain
4	RW	Aymen Toumi	11 July 1990 (aged 26)	1.83 m	95	163	(France) Montpellier
6	P	Issam Tej	29 July 1979 (aged 37)	1.87 m	316	824	(Qatar) El Jaish
7	LB	Skander Zaïdi	23 April 1997 (aged 19)	1.97 m	0	0	(Tunisia) Béni Khiar
9	RB	Amine Bannour	21 February 1990 (aged 26)	1.96 m	112	340	(Tunisia) Club Africain
15	LB	Khaled Haj Youssef	12 January 1989 (aged 27)	1.89 m	45	30	(Tunisia) Club Africain
16	GK	Marouane Soussi	21 June 1988 (aged 28)	1.94 m	0	0	(Tunisia) Sakiet Ezzit
19	LB	Mosbah Sanaï	26 March 1991 (aged 25)	1.91 m	88	228	(Qatar) Al-Quyada
21	LW	Oussama Boughanmi	5 February 1990 (aged 26)	1.85 m	113	496	(Tunisia) Espérance de Tunis
22	CB	Sobhi Saïed	26 September 1982 (aged 34)	1.86 m	156	331	(Qatar) Al-Gharafa
23	RW	Oussama Hosni	17 September 1992 (aged 24)	1.92 m	59	74	(Tunisia) Club Africain
29	RW	Tarak Jallouz	1 November 1993 (aged 23)	1.83 m	1	0	(Tunisia) Espérance de Tunis
31	P	Marouan Chouiref	27 May 1990 (aged 26)	1.95 m	104	135	(Tunisia) Espérance de Tunis
39	CB	Mohamed Soussi	17 January 1993 (aged 23)	1.94 m	56	71	(Tunisia) Club Africain
42	LB	Wael Jallouz	3 May 1991 (aged 25)	1.97 m	113	305	(Spain) FC Barcelona
69	P	Jihed Jaballah	29 July 1989 (aged 27)	2.04 m	16	26	(Tunisia) Étoile Sportive du Sahel

== Group C ==
=== Belarus ===
A 19-player squad was announced on 19 December 2016. It was reduced to 18 on 27 December 2016.

Head coach: Yuri Shevtsov

No.	Pos.	Name	Date of birth (age)	Height	App.	Goals	Club
2	LW	Ivan Brouka	20 April 1980 (aged 36)	1.78 m	169	544	(Belarus) SKA Minsk
3	LB	Uladzislau Kulesh	28 May 1996 (aged 20)	2.00 m	14	26	(Belarus) SKA Minsk
7	LB	Aliaksei Shynkel	6 July 1994 (aged 22)	2.00 m	2	3	(Belarus) SKA Minsk
9	RB	Aleh Astrashapkin	20 January 1992 (aged 24)	1.90 m	13	25	(Hungary) Csurgói KK
10	CB	Barys Pukhouski	3 January 1987 (aged 30)	1.84 m	155	676	(Ukraine) Motor Zaporizhzhia
12	GK	Ivan Matskevich	8 May 1991 (aged 25)	1.86 m	36	0	(Romania) Steaua București
15	RW	Dzianis Rutenka	14 February 1986 (aged 30)	1.86 m	93	246	(Belarus) Meshkov Brest
16	GK	Viachaslau Saldatsenka	23 August 1994 (aged 22)	1.88 m	15	0	(Belarus) SKA Minsk
18	RB	Siarhei Shylovich	16 May 1986 (aged 30)	1.95 m	114	363	(Belarus) Meshkov Brest
22	P	Viachaslau Shumak	22 December 1988 (aged 28)	2.03 m	71	127	(Belarus) Meshkov Brest
23	LW	Andrei Yurynok	21 September 1996 (aged 20)	1.98 m	24	55	(Belarus) Meshkov Brest
24	RW	Maksim Baranau	11 April 1988 (aged 28)	1.88 m	115	281	(Romania) Odorheiu Secuiesc
47	CB	Aliaksandr Padshyvalau	8 March 1996 (aged 20)	1.88 m	10	43	(Belarus) SKA Minsk
50	P	Artsem Karalek	20 February 1996 (aged 20)	1.96 m	19	55	(France) Saint-Raphaël
55	LW	Aliaksandr Tsitou	28 October 1986 (aged 30)	1.90 m	142	134	(Finland) Riihimäki Cocks
95	CB	Vadim Gayduchenko	24 April 1995 (aged 21)	1.93 m	0	0	(Belarus) SKA Minsk

=== Chile ===
The squad was announced on 26 December 2016.

Head coach: Mateo Garralda

No.	Pos.	Name	Date of birth (age)	Height	App.	Goals	Club
1	GK	Felipe Barrientos	12 June 1984 (aged 32)	1.87 m	83	2	(Chile) Italiano
2	LW	Sebastián Ceballos	1 July 1992 (aged 24)	1.75 m	20	40	(Spain) BM Zamora
4	LB	Erwin Feuchtmann	2 May 1990 (aged 26)	1.90 m	65	180	(Austria) SGH Insignis
6	RW	Pablo Baeza	11 November 1988 (aged 28)	1.78 m	13	30	(Chile) BM Usab
7	LB	Diego Reyes	24 July 1992 (aged 24)	1.82 m	40	65	(Spain) BM Alarcos
8	RW	Erik Caniu	2 October 1988 (aged 28)	1.85 m	10	13	(Chile) Luterano
9	P	Javier Frelijj	28 January 1991 (aged 25)	1.90 m	15	35	(Chile) BM Inter
10	CB	Emil Feuchtmann	1 June 1983 (aged 33)	1.76 m	65	180	(Switzerland) Wacker Thun
11	P	Esteban Salinas	18 January 1992 (aged 24)	1.80 m	49	105	(Spain) BM Benidorm
12	GK	Felipe García	20 November 1993 (aged 23)	1.88 m	55	1	(Turkey) MYK Hentbol
16	GK	René Oliva	7 March 1987 (aged 29)	1.96 m	66	0	(Chile) Ovalle
17	RB	Rodrigo Salinas Muñoz	25 February 1989 (aged 27)	1.88 m	65	190	(France) Chartres Métropole
20	LW	Harald Feuchtmann	22 December 1987 (aged 29)	1.76 m	30	45	(Germany) DJK Waldbüttelbrunn
21	CB	Cristián Moll Ramírez	13 March 1993 (aged 23)	1.85 m	35	48	(Spain) Sant Joan
28	P	José Luis López	17 June 1998 (aged 18)	1.92 m	13	29	(Chile) Unión Machali
77	LB	Víctor Donoso	27 November 1990 (aged 26)	1.90 m	30	40	(France) Handball Montélimar

=== Croatia ===
A 16-player squad was announced on 27 December 2016, while players from the German League joined in January 2017. On 29 December 2016, Marino Marić was replaced by Krešimir Kozina due to an injury. On 10 January 2017, a 17-player squad announced.

Head coach: Željko Babić

No.	Pos.	Name	Date of birth (age)	Height	App.	Goals	Club
1	GK	Ivan Stevanović	18 May 1982 (aged 34)	1.93 m	38	0	(Croatia) RK Zagreb
2	LW	Lovro Mihić	25 August 1994 (aged 22)	1.80 m	6	10	(Poland) Wisła Płock
5	CB	Domagoj Duvnjak	1 June 1988 (aged 28)	1.97 m	175	576	(Germany) THW Kiel
7	RB	Luka Stepančić	20 November 1990 (aged 26)	2.03 m	42	92	(France) Paris Saint-Germain
10	LB	Jakov Gojun	18 April 1986 (aged 30)	2.04 m	17	19	(Germany) Füchse Berlin
11	RW	Jerko Matulić	20 April 1990 (aged 26)	1.87 m	28	59	(France) HBC Nantes
12	GK	Ivan Pešić	17 March 1989 (aged 27)	1.93 m	34	1	(Belarus) Meshkov Brest
13	RW	Zlatko Horvat	25 September 1984 (aged 32)	1.79 m	134	387	(Croatia) RK Zagreb
20	P	Tin Kontrec	9 September 1989 (aged 27)	1.96 m	4	3	(Croatia) RK Zagreb
22	RW	Josip Božić-Pavletić	6 August 1994 (aged 22)	1.87 m	0	0	(Croatia) Nexe Našice
23	LB	Stipe Mandalinić	9 September 1992 (aged 24)	1.95 m	19	18	(Croatia) RK Zagreb
26	LW	Manuel Štrlek	1 December 1988 (aged 28)	1.81 m	122	429	(Poland) Vive Tauron Kielce
28	P	Željko Musa	8 January 1986 (aged 31)	2.00 m	84	56	(Germany) SC Magdeburg
29	CB	Lovro Jotić	12 November 1994 (aged 22)	1.91 m	0	0	(Croatia) RK Zagreb
30	LB	Marko Mamić	6 March 1994 (aged 22)	2.00 m	25	27	(France) Dunkerque
31	RB	Luka Šebetić	26 May 1994 (aged 22)	1.98 m	13	24	(Croatia) RK Zagreb
33	CB	Luka Cindrić	5 July 1993 (aged 23)	1.82 m	24	28	(North Macedonia) RK Vardar

=== Germany ===
An 18-player squad was announced on 22 December 2016. The final squad was revealed on 9 January 2017.

Head coach: Dagur Sigurðsson

No.	Pos.	Name	Date of birth (age)	Height	App.	Goals	Club
3	LW	Uwe Gensheimer	26 October 1986 (aged 30)	1.88 m	132	590	(France) Paris Saint-Germain
6	LB	Finn Lemke	30 April 1992 (aged 24)	2.10 m	45	21	(Germany) SC Magdeburg
7	P	Patrick Wiencek	22 March 1989 (aged 27)	2.01 m	96	220	(Germany) THW Kiel
9	RW	Tobias Reichmann	27 May 1988 (aged 28)	1.88 m	59	185	(Poland) Vive Tauron Kielce
11	RB	Holger Glandorf	30 March 1983 (aged 33)	1.97 m	168	579	(Germany) SG Flensburg-Handewitt
12	GK	Silvio Heinevetter	21 October 1984 (aged 32)	1.94 m	152	1	(Germany) Füchse Berlin
13	P	Hendrik Pekeler	2 July 1991 (aged 25)	2.03 m	62	90	(Germany) Rhein-Neckar Löwen
23	LB	Steffen Fäth	4 April 1990 (aged 26)	1.95 m	45	86	(Germany) Füchse Berlin
24	RW	Patrick Groetzki	4 July 1989 (aged 27)	1.89 m	104	283	(Germany) Rhein-Neckar Löwen
25	RB	Kai Häfner	10 July 1989 (aged 27)	1.92 m	43	95	(Germany) TSV Hannover-Burgdorf
33	GK	Andreas Wolff	3 March 1991 (aged 25)	1.98 m	44	6	(Germany) THW Kiel
34	LW	Rune Dahmke	10 April 1993 (aged 23)	1.89 m	22	52	(Germany) THW Kiel
35	LB	Julius Kühn	1 April 1993 (aged 23)	1.98 m	23	80	(Germany) VfL Gummersbach
40	CB	Simon Ernst	2 April 1994 (aged 22)	1.95 m	30	33	(Germany) VfL Gummersbach
43	CB	Niclas Pieczkowski	28 December 1989 (aged 27)	1.93 m	23	26	(Germany) SC DHfK Leipzig
48	P	Jannik Kohlbacher	19 July 1995 (aged 21)	1.93 m	23	48	(Germany) HSG Wetzlar
95	CB	Paul Drux	7 February 1995 (aged 21)	1.92 m	44	98	(Germany) Füchse Berlin

=== Hungary ===
A 28-player squad was announced on 16 December 2016. It was reduced to 18 on 31 December 2016.

Head coach: Xavi Sabaté

No.	Pos.	Name	Date of birth (age)	Height	App.	Goals	Club
2	RB	Zsolt Balogh	29 March 1989 (aged 27)	1.89 m	25	48	(Hungary) MOL-Pick Szeged
5	P	Timuzsin Schuch	5 June 1985 (aged 31)	1.97 m	142	74	(Hungary) MVM Veszprém
7	CB	Gábor Császár	16 June 1984 (aged 32)	1.86 m	227	789	(Switzerland) Kadetten Schaffhausen
10	RW	Gergely Harsányi	3 May 1981 (aged 35)	1.91 m	172	258	(Hungary) Tatabánya KC
11	LB	Patrik Ligetvári	13 February 1996 (aged 20)	2.01 m	6	6	(Hungary) MVM Veszprém
12	GK	Nándor Fazekas	16 October 1976 (aged 40)	1.92 m	229	1	(Hungary) Balatonfüredi KSE
16	GK	Roland Mikler	20 September 1984 (aged 32)	1.90 m	166	0	(Hungary) MVM Veszprém
19	RB	László Nagy	3 March 1981 (aged 35)	2.08 m	193	724	(Hungary) MVM Veszprém
20	RW	Péter Gulyás	4 March 1984 (aged 32)	2.00 m	108	214	(Hungary) MVM Veszprém
22	LB	Iman Jamali	11 October 1991 (aged 25)	2.02 m	18	40	(Belarus) HC Meshkov Brest
25	P	Szabolcs Zubai	31 March 1984 (aged 32)	1.91 m	204	303	(Hungary) MOL-Pick Szeged
27	P	Bence Bánhidi	9 February 1995 (aged 21)	2.04 m	30	64	(Hungary) MOL-Pick Szeged
28	P	Szabolcs Szöllősi	28 January 1989 (aged 27)	1.94 m	62	94	(Hungary) Tatabánya KC
29	CB	Ádám Juhász	6 June 1996 (aged 20)	1.83 m	6	11	(Hungary) Tatabánya KC
33	RB	Gábor Ancsin	27 November 1990 (aged 26)	2.02 m	83	184	(Hungary) MVM Veszprém
39	LB	Richárd Bodó	13 March 1993 (aged 23)	2.03 m	29	86	(Hungary) MOL-Pick Szeged
66	CB	Máté Lékai	16 June 1988 (aged 28)	1.90 m	102	228	(Hungary) MVM Veszprém

=== Saudi Arabia ===
A 25-player squad was announced on 30 November 2016.

Head coach: Nenad Kljaić

No.	Pos.	Name	Date of birth (age)	Height	App.	Goals	Club
1	P	Ali Al-Ibrahim	24 April 1997 (aged 19)	1.81 m	14	29	(Saudi Arabia) Al-Ahli
3	LW	Abdullah Al-Abbas	30 January 1992 (aged 24)	1.65 m	45	160	(Saudi Arabia) Al-Noor
5	P	Hassan Al-Janabi (c)	25 July 1983 (aged 33)	1.86 m	59	73	(Saudi Arabia) Mudhar
7	CB	Sadiq Al-Mohsin	23 October 1997 (aged 19)	1.80 m	19	110	(Saudi Arabia) Al-Moheet
8	CB	Abdullah Al-Hammad	10 October 1990 (aged 26)	1.85 m	83	109	(Saudi Arabia) Al-Noor
12	GK	Manaf Al-Saeed	19 May 1976 (aged 40)	1.89 m	206	14	(Saudi Arabia) Al-Noor
13	RW	Abdulazez Saeed	28 January 1990 (aged 26)	1.89 m	14	10	(Saudi Arabia) Al-Ahli
15	RW	Ahmed Al-Abdulali	18 June 1988 (aged 28)	1.82 m	113	281	(Saudi Arabia) Mudhar
16	GK	Mohammad Al-Salem	3 April 1986 (aged 30)	1.85 m	131	6	(Saudi Arabia) Al-Noor
18	CB	Fahad Al-Farhan	25 October 1995 (aged 21)	1.76 m	6	1	(Saudi Arabia) Al-Rawdhah
22	P	Mahdi Al-Salem	16 February 1990 (aged 26)	1.85 m	119	382	(Saudi Arabia) Al-Noor
23	GK	Nawaf Al-Mutairi	13 April 1989 (aged 27)	1.90 m	7	0	(Saudi Arabia) Al-Wehda
24	CB	Hisham Al-Obaidi	20 March 1988 (aged 28)	1.82 m	117	317	(Saudi Arabia) Al-Noor
33	LW	Muneer Abu Alrahi	25 March 1990 (aged 26)	1.70 m	30	60	(Saudi Arabia) Mudhar
37	CB	Mohammed Al-Abbas	19 December 1992 (aged 24)	1.68 m	74	146	(Saudi Arabia) Mudhar
39	CB	Hassan Al-Khadrawi	2 March 1990 (aged 26)	1.74 m	18	46	(Saudi Arabia) Mudhar
57	CB	Mojtaba Al-Salem	15 June 1994 (aged 22)	1.81 m	39	110	(Saudi Arabia) Al-Noor
87	CB	Mohammed Al-Zaer	2 February 1987 (aged 29)	1.82 m	79	180	(Saudi Arabia) Mudhar

== Group D ==
=== Argentina ===
An 18-player squad was announced on 27 December 2016.

Head coach: Eduardo Gallardo

No.	Pos.	Name	Date of birth (age)	Height	App.	Goals	Club
1	GK	Matías Schulz	12 February 1982 (aged 34)	1.90 m	177	0	(Switzerland) Pfadi Winterthur
2	LW	Federico Fernández	17 October 1989 (aged 27)	1.91 m	99	349	(Argentina) UNLu
3	RW	Federico Pizarro	6 July 1986 (aged 30)	1.83 m	132	592	(Argentina) UNLu
4	CB	Sebastián Simonet	12 May 1986 (aged 30)	1.90 m	81	345	(Spain) Ademar León
5	P	Pablo Sebastián Portela	21 June 1980 (aged 36)	1.92 m	132	68	(Argentina) Colegio Ward
6	CB	Diego Simonet	26 December 1989 (aged 27)	1.89 m	90	458	(France) Montpellier
8	LB	Pablo Simonet	4 May 1992 (aged 24)	1.85 m	53	118	(Spain) CB Benidorm
9	RB	Leonardo Facundo Querín	17 April 1982 (aged 34)	1.97 m	164	244	(France) Billère
10	RB	Federico Matías Vieyra	21 July 1988 (aged 28)	1.92 m	105	249	(Spain) Ademar León
11	P	Lucas Moscariello	19 February 1992 (aged 24)	1.90 m	22	58	(Spain) Villa de Aranda
12	GK	Fernando Gabriel García	31 August 1981 (aged 35)	1.90 m	198	5	(France) Vernon Saint-Marcel
13	CB	Juan Pablo Fernández	30 September 1988 (aged 28)	1.92 m	104	309	(Argentina) UNLu
15	P	Gonzalo Carou	15 August 1979 (aged 37)	1.90 m	207	462	(Spain) Ademar León
18	LW	Adrián Portela	8 March 1986 (aged 30)	1.85 m	42	116	(Argentina) River Plate
23	CB	Julián Souto Cueto	1 October 1992 (aged 24)	1.81 m	37	148	(Argentina) Villa Ballester
24	LB	Sebastien Dechamps	12 January 1994 (aged 22)	1.84 m	15	65	(Argentina) Quilmes
25	RW	Pablo Vainstein	18 July 1987 (aged 29)	1.84 m	40	55	(Spain) Ciudad Encantada

=== Bahrain ===
A 20-player squad was announced on 20 December 2016. It was reduced to 19 on 2 January 2017.

Head coach: Salah Bouchekriou

No.	Pos.	Name	Date of birth (age)	Height	App.	Goals	Club
3	P	Ali Eid	18 January 1991 (aged 25)	1.78 m	45	110	(Bahrain) Al-Najma
7	RB	Ali Merza	7 July 1988 (aged 28)	1.79 m	65	360	(Bahrain) Al-Najma
8	P	Hasan Shebab	12 October 1988 (aged 28)	1.78 m	55	250	(Bahrain) Al-Najma
9	RW	Hasan Al-Samahiji	22 February 1991 (aged 25)	1.74 m	50	270	(Saudi Arabia) Al-Ahli Club
12	GK	Husain Al-Qaidoom	21 November 1986 (aged 30)	1.65 m	30	0	Bahrain SC
14	LW	Mahmood Abdulqader	4 October 1983 (aged 33)	1.76 m	65	450	(Bahrain) Barbar
19	P	Mohamed Merza	17 April 1987 (aged 29)	1.93 m	45	210	(Saudi Arabia) Al-Ahli Club
21	GK	Mohamed Abdulhusain	12 August 1989 (aged 27)	1.90 m	112	30	(Bahrain) Al-Najma
27	RW	Bilal Basham Askani	7 April 1991 (aged 25)	1.77 m	35	155	(Bahrain) Al-Najma SC
50	LB	Ahmed Al-Maqabi	26 October 1994 (aged 22)	1.75 m	45	165	(Bahrain) Barbar
51	LB	Mohamed Al-Maqabi	14 July 1988 (aged 28)	1.81 m	75	160	(Saudi Arabia) Al-Ahli Club
66	LB	Komail Mahfoodh	28 April 1992 (aged 24)	1.77 m	30	150	(Bahrain) Al-Najma SC
77	LB	Jasim Al-Salatna	23 March 1989 (aged 27)	1.88 m	90	550	(Saudi Arabia) Al-Ahli Club
86	GK	Ali Khamis	9 August 1986 (aged 30)	1.80 m	50	6	(Bahrain) Ettifaq
89	LW	Mahdi Saad	15 March 1989 (aged 27)	1.77 m	50	230	(Saudi Arabia) Al-Ahli Club
93	RW	Mohamed Habib	20 July 1993 (aged 23)	1.85 m	78	480	(Bahrain) Barbar
99	CB	Husain Al-Sayyad (c)	14 January 1988 (aged 28)	1.75 m	117	650	(Saudi Arabia) Al-Noor Club

=== Denmark ===
A 19-player squad was announced on 16 December 2016. It was reduced to 17 on 9 January 2017.

Head coach: Guðmundur Guðmundsson

No.	Pos.	Name	Date of birth (age)	Height	App.	Goals	Club
1	GK	Niklas Landin Jacobsen	19 December 1988 (aged 28)	2.01 m	158	4	(Germany) THW Kiel
3	RB	Niclas Kirkeløkke	26 March 1994 (aged 22)	1.95 m	5	8	(Denmark) GOG Håndbold
4	LW	Magnus Landin Jacobsen	20 August 1995 (aged 21)	1.96 m	11	18	(Denmark) KIF Kolding København
5	CB	Mads Mensah Larsen	12 August 1991 (aged 25)	1.88 m	81	174	(Germany) Rhein-Neckar Löwen
6	LW	Casper Ulrich Mortensen	14 December 1989 (aged 27)	1.90 m	87	249	(Germany) TSV Hannover-Burgdorf
15	P	Jesper Nøddesbo	23 October 1980 (aged 36)	1.99 m	217	440	(Spain) FC Barcelona
16	GK	Jannick Green	29 September 1988 (aged 28)	1.95 m	85	1	(Germany) SC Magdeburg
17	RW	Lasse Svan Hansen	31 August 1983 (aged 33)	1.85 m	171	378	(Germany) SG Flensburg-Handewitt
18	RW	Hans Lindberg	1 August 1981 (aged 35)	1.88 m	232	628	(Germany) Füchse Berlin
19	P	Rene Toft Hansen	1 November 1984 (aged 32)	2.00 m	114	175	(Germany) THW Kiel
21	LB	Henrik Møllgaard	2 January 1985 (aged 32)	1.96 m	105	144	(France) Paris Saint-Germain
22	RB	Kasper Søndergaard	9 June 1981 (aged 35)	1.92 m	176	376	(Denmark) Skjern Håndbold
23	P	Henrik Toft Hansen	18 December 1986 (aged 30)	2.00 m	93	172	(Germany) SG Flensburg-Handewitt
24	LB	Mikkel Hansen	22 October 1987 (aged 29)	1.92 m	163	774	(France) Paris Saint-Germain
25	CB	Morten Olsen	11 October 1984 (aged 32)	1.84 m	48	141	(Germany) TSV Hannover-Burgdorf
27	LB	Michael Damgaard	18 March 1990 (aged 26)	1.92 m	45	102	(Germany) SC Magdeburg
28	CB	Lasse Andersson	11 March 1994 (aged 22)	1.95 m	13	17	(Spain) FC Barcelona

=== Egypt ===
A 20-player squad was announced on 25 December 2016. The final squad was revealed on 3 January 2017.

Head coach: Marwan Ragab

No.	Pos.	Name	Date of birth (age)	Height	App.	Goals	Club
3	RB	Mamdouh Abouebaid	1 January 1988 (aged 29)	1.87 m	144	512	(Egypt) Al Ahly
5	RW	Yahia Omar	9 September 1997 (aged 19)	1.98 m	37	97	(Egypt) Zamalek SC
8	P	Mahmoud Ramadan	7 March 1984 (aged 32)	1.85 m	178	633	(Egypt) Al Ahly
9	CB	Eslam Issa	2 July 1988 (aged 28)	1.90 m	233	655	(Egypt) Al Ahly
10	RB	Abouelfetoh Abdelrazek	12 February 1987 (aged 29)	1.93 m	125	457	(Egypt) Smouha SC
17	LW	Ahmed Khairy	15 September 1994 (aged 22)	1.88 m	66	178	(Egypt) Al Gazira
19	CB	Mohamed El-Bassiouny	10 May 1990 (aged 26)	1.86 m	136	399	(Egypt) Alexandria SC
24	P	Ibrahim El-Masry	11 March 1989 (aged 27)	1.95 m	133	178	(Egypt) Al Ahly
28	LB	Abdelrahman Abdou	30 January 1996 (aged 20)	1.92 m	29	89	(Egypt) Al Ahly
39	LB	Yehia El-Deraa	17 July 1995 (aged 21)	1.90 m	77	266	(Egypt) Heliopolice
66	RB	Ahmed El-Ahmar	27 January 1984 (aged 32)	1.89 m	377	723	(Egypt) Zamalek
86	GK	Hady Shahin	2 September 1986 (aged 30)	1.96 m	180	0	(Egypt) Heliopolis SC
88	GK	Karim Handawy	1 May 1988 (aged 28)	1.88 m	190	0	(Egypt) Al Ahly
89	P	Mohamed Mamdouh	4 January 1989 (aged 27)	1.91 m	189	522	(France) Pays d’Aix
91	RW	Mohamed Sanad	16 January 1991 (aged 25)	1.91 m	150	567	(Spain) Ciudad de Logroño
92	LW	Karim Abdelrahim	27 October 1992 (aged 24)	1.87 m	72	145	(Egypt) Zamalek

=== Qatar ===
A 23-player squad was announced on 14 December 2016.

Head coach: Valero Rivera López

No.	Pos.	Name	Date of birth (age)	Height	App.	Goals	Club
4	P	Hassan Mabrouk	29 July 1982 (aged 34)	1.90 m	36	65	(Qatar) El Jaish
5	RB	Mustafa Alsaltialkrad	16 March 1987 (aged 29)	1.86 m	14	22	(Qatar) Al Sadd
7	LB	Bertrand Roiné	17 February 1981 (aged 35)	1.96 m	46	81	(Qatar) Lekhwiya
9	LB	Rafael Capote	5 October 1987 (aged 29)	1.98 m	40	170	(Qatar) El Jaish
10	RW	Abdulla Al-Karbi	10 June 1990 (aged 26)	1.77 m	42	112	(Qatar) Al Sadd
11	LW	Abdulrazzaq Murad	29 June 1990 (aged 26)	1.86 m	78	180	(Qatar) Al-Gharafa
12	GK	Danijel Šarić	27 June 1977 (aged 39)	1.95 m	28	0	(Qatar) Al Qiyada
13	RB	Ahmed Abdelhak	14 February 1988 (aged 28)	1.85 m	7	17	(Qatar) Al-Gharafa
14	P	Bassel Al-Rayes	4 March 1979 (aged 37)	1.80 m	45	159	(Qatar) Al-Rayan
20	CB	Omar Al-Safadi	4 September 1994 (aged 22)	1.82 m	23	48	(Qatar) Al-Rayan
24	LB	Wajdi Sinen	17 September 1990 (aged 26)	1.93 m	60	221	(Qatar) Lekhwiya
25	CB	Kamalaldin Mallash	1 January 1992 (aged 25)	1.80 m	68	120	(Qatar) El Jaish
31	LW	Ahmad Madadi (c)	31 August 1994 (aged 22)	1.80 m	23	60	(Qatar) Lekhwiya
41	P	Youssef Benali	28 May 1987 (aged 29)	1.93 m	37	94	(Tunisia) Espérance Sportive de Tunis
55	CB	Abdelrahman Abdalla	1 January 1994 (aged 23)	1.89 m	23	38	(Qatar) El Jaish
85	GK	Yousuf Al-Abdulla	26 February 1985 (aged 31)	1.78 m	33	0	(Qatar) Al-Gharafa
86	CB	Mahmoud Hassaballa	22 November 1986 (aged 30)	1.84 m	31	70	(Qatar) Al Sadd
92	LW	Anis Zouaoui	7 February 1992 (aged 24)	1.84 m	2	10	(Qatar) Al Sadd

=== Sweden ===
An 18-player squad was announced on 8 December 2016. Viktor Östlund was replaced by Philip Stenmalm on 28 December 2016 because of an injury.

Head coach: Kristján Andrésson

No.	Pos.	Name	Date of birth (age)	Height	App.	Goals	Club
5	LB	Simon Jeppsson	15 July 1995 (aged 21)	2.03 m	5	15	(Sweden) Lugi HF
7	P	Max Darj	27 September 1991 (aged 25)	1.92 m	10	9	(Sweden) Alingsås HK
9	LW	Jerry Tollbring	13 September 1995 (aged 21)	1.82 m	15	51	(Sweden) IFK Kristianstad
10	RW	Niclas Ekberg	23 December 1988 (aged 28)	1.91 m	140	563	(Germany) THW Kiel
12	GK	Andreas Palicka	10 July 1986 (aged 30)	1.89 m	61	0	(Germany) Rhein-Neckar Löwen
14	CB	Jesper Konradsson	4 June 1994 (aged 22)	1.84 m	30	39	(Sweden) Alingsås HK
18	P	Fredric Pettersson	11 February 1989 (aged 27)	2.01 m	14	25	(France) Fenix Toulouse
20	GK	Mikael Appelgren	6 September 1989 (aged 27)	1.91 m	49	1	(Germany) Rhein-Neckar Löwen
21	LW	Emil Frend Öfors	13 September 1994 (aged 22)	1.93 m	0	0	(Sweden) Alingsås HK
23	RB	Albin Lagergren	11 September 1992 (aged 24)	1.86 m	10	17	(Sweden) IFK Kristianstad
24	CB	Jim Gottfridsson	2 September 1992 (aged 24)	1.91 m	37	120	(Germany) Flensburg-Handewitt
28	LB	Philip Stenmalm	3 March 1992 (aged 24)	2.00 m	33	56	(Denmark) KIF Kolding København
32	RW	Mattias Zachrisson	22 August 1990 (aged 26)	1.78 m	88	162	(Germany) Füchse Berlin
35	P	Andreas Nilsson	12 April 1990 (aged 26)	1.97 m	107	241	(Hungary) MVM Veszprém
36	P	Jesper Nielsen	30 August 1989 (aged 27)	2.00 m	78	90	(France) Paris Saint-Germain
65	LB	Lukas Nilsson	16 November 1996 (aged 20)	1.94 m	29	76	(Germany) THW Kiel

== Statistics ==
=== Player representation by league system ===
League systems with 10 or more players represented are listed. In all, World Cup squad members play for clubs in 31 different countries.

Country	Players	Outside national squad
Germany	51	37
France	41	28
Spain	31	24
Poland	23	8
Hungary	22	9
Saudi Arabia	22	6
Qatar	18	3
Denmark	14	12
Tunisia	14	1
Egypt	14	0
Japan	14	0
Angola	13	0
(North Macedonia) Macedonia	12	6
Belarus	12	2
Croatia	11	4

=== Player representation by club ===
Clubs with 8 or more players represented are listed.

Club	Players
(France) Paris Saint-Germain	12
(Spain) FC Barcelona	10
(Croatia) Zagreb	10
(Hungary) Telekom Veszprém	9
(Germany) Füchse Berlin	8
(Germany) THW Kiel	8
(Poland) Vive Tauron Kielce	8
(France) Montpellier	8
(Poland) Wisła Płock	8
(Germany) Rhein-Neckar Löwen	8

=== Coaches representation by country ===
Coaches in bold represented their own country.

Nº	Country	Coaches
6	Spain	Talant Duyshebaev (Poland), Mateo Garralda (Chile), Antonio Carlos Ortega (Japan), **Jordi Ribera**, Valero Rivera (Qatar), Xavi Sabaté (Hungary)
4	Iceland	Kristján Andrésson (Sweden), Guðmundur Guðmundsson (Denmark), **Geir Sveinsson**, Dagur Sigurðsson (Germany)
3	Croatia	**Željko Babić**, Lino Červar (Macedonia), Nenad Kljaić (Saudi Arabia)
1	Algeria	Salah Bouchekriou (Bahrain)
1	Angola	**Alexandre Machado**
1	Argentina	**Eduardo Gallardo**
1	Belarus	**Yuri Shevtsov**
1	Brazil	**Washington Nunes**
1	Egypt	**Marwan Ragab**
1	France	**Didier Dinart** / **Guillaume Gille**
1	Montenegro	Veselin Vujović (Slovenia)
1	Norway	**Christian Berge**
1	Russia	**Dmitri Torgovanov**
1	Tunisia	**Hafedh Zouabi**
