= Masatake =

- Gender: Male

Origin
- Origin: Japanese
- Meaning: Different meanings depending on the kanji used

Masatake (written: 正毅, 正武 or 昌丈) is a masculine Japanese given name. Notable people with the name include:

- Inaba Masatake (稲葉 正武; 1769–1840), Japanese daimyō
- Masatake Kimura (木村 昌丈; born 1990), Japanese handball player
- Masatake Kuranishi (倉西 正武; 1924–2021), mathematician
- Masatake Okumiya (奥宮 正武; 1909–2007), Japanese aviator and historian
- Terauchi Masatake (寺内 正毅; 1852–1919), Japanese military officer, politician and Prime Minister of Japan
