= Nawaf Al-Mutairi =

Nawaf Al-Mutairi may refer to:

- Nawaf Al-Mutairi (footballer, born 1982), Kuwaiti football player
- Nawaf Al-Mutairi (handballer) (born 1989), Saudi handball player
