= Uegaki =

Uegaki (written: 植垣) is a Japanese surname. Notable people with the surname include:

- Akie Uegaki (植垣 暁恵, born 1984), Japanese handball player
- Kento Uegaki (born 1990), Japanese handball player
