= Allaedine Berrached =

Qatari handball player (born 1994)

Personal information
- Nationality: Qatari
- Born: 31 January 1994 (age 32)
- Height: 1.86 m (6 ft 1 in)

Sport
- Sport: Handball
- Position: Right wing
- Current club: Al-Duhail
- Number: 23
National team
Years	Team	Apps	(Gls)
–	Qatar	46	(100)
Medal record
Asian Championship
Gold medal – first place	2024 Bahrain

Allaedine Berrached (born 31 January 1994) is a Qatari handball player for Al-Duhail and the Qatari national team.

He represented Qatar at the 2019 World Men's Handball Championship.
