= César Montes Agüera =

Spanish handball player and coach

César Montes
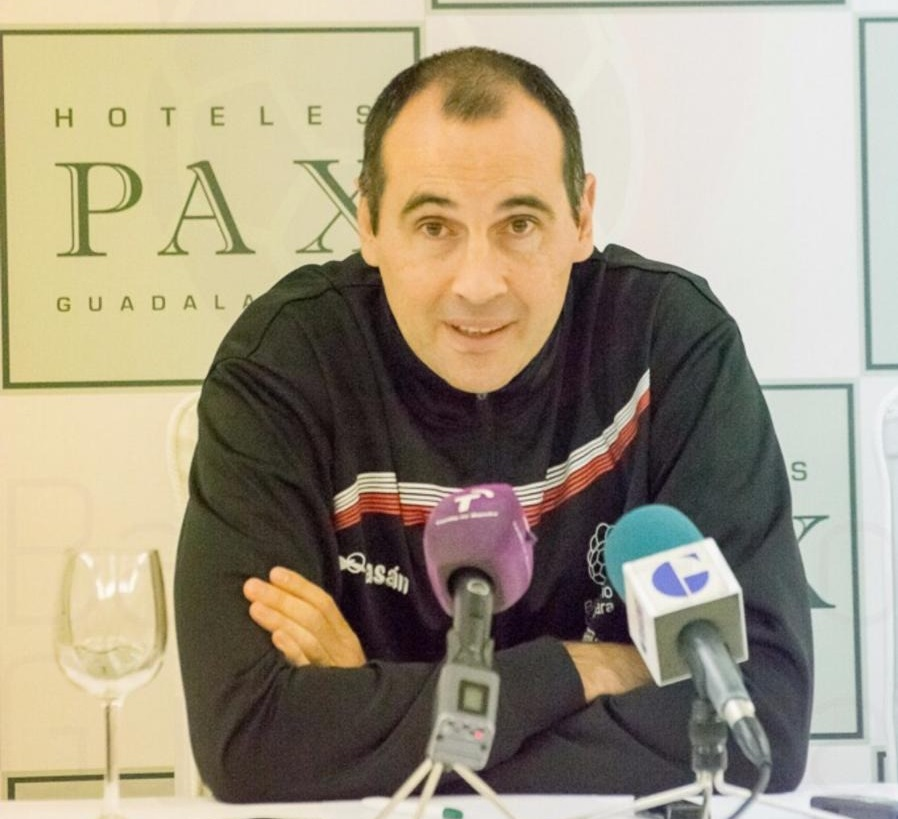

Personal information
- Full name: César Jesús Montes Agüera
- Born: 6 January 1976 (age 50) Córdoba, Spain

Sport
- Sport: Handball

Senior clubs
- Years: Team
- 1994–1996: Córdoba Balonmano
- 1996–1998: Club Balonmano Pozoblanco
- 1998: BM Altea
- 1998–1999: Club Balonmano Cangas
- 1999–2004: CB Valladolid
- 2004–2006: Balonmano Ciudad de Almeria

Teams managed
- 2008–2009: Adesal
- 2009–2013: ARS Palma del Río
- 2014–2019: BM Guadalajara
- 2019–: Spain (assistant)

César Jesús Montes Agüera (born 6 january 1975) is a Spanish handball coach and former player.

== Playing career ==
Montes began playing handball at Córdoba Balonmano. In 1996 he joined Club Balonmano Pozoblanco. In his first season at the club he helped them getting promoted to the Liga ASOBAL. During the 1997-98 season he joined league rivals BM Altea, where he played the latter half of the season. For the 1998-99 season he joined Club Balonmano Cangas.

In 1999 he joined CB Valladolid, where he played until 2004. He then joined Balonmano Ciudad de Almeria, where he played until his retirement in 2006.

In 1994 he played two matches for the Spanish youth national team.

== Coaching career ==
In the 2008-09 season he coached Adesal. He then joined ARS Palma del Río. From 2014 to 2019 he coached BM Guadalajara. In May 2019 he became the assistant coach of the Spanish national team under Jordi Ribera. In 2024 he was part of the team that won bronze medals at the 2024 Olympics.
