= Iñaki Peciña =

Spanish handball player (born 1988)

Personal information
- Full name: Iñaki Peciña Tomé
- Nationality: Spanish
- Born: 31 May 1988 (age 38) Irún, Spain
- Height: 2.00 m (6 ft 7 in)

Sport
- Sport: Handball
- Position: pivot
- Current club: Chambéry Savoie Mont-Blanc Handball
- Number: 7

Senior clubs
- Years: Team
- 2007-2010: Bidasoa Irún
- 2010-2011: BM Torrevieja
- 2011-2012: SDC San Antonio
- 2012-2014: BM Valladolid
- 2014-2015: BM Guadalajara
- 2015-2016: BM Villa de Aranda
- 2016-2017: CB Ciudad de Logroño
- 2017-2022: Pays d'Aix UC
- 2022-: Chambéry Savoie Mont-Blanc Handball
National team
Years	Team	Apps	(Gls)
2018-	Spain	60	(27)
Medal record
European Championship
Silver medal – second place	2022 Hungary/Slovakia
Mediterranean Games
Bronze medal – third place	2018 Mediterranean Games
World Championship
Bronze medal – third place	2023 Poland/Sweden
- Updated on 25 July 2025

Iñaki Peciña Tomé (born 31 May 1988) is a Spanish handball player for the French club Chambéry Savoie Mont-Blanc Handball and the Spanish national team. In 2022 he won silver medals at the European Championship.

== Career ==
Peciña started playing handball at Bidasoa Irún. Here he made his senior debut in the second tier of Spanish handball, the División de Plata de Balonmano. In 2010-11 he joined first league team BM Torrevieja, where he played for a season. He then joined BM Valladolid, where he also only played for a season, due to the club's financial problems.

The following seasons he jumped around Spanish clubs. He played for BM Guadalajara, BM Villa de Aranda and CB Ciudad de Logroño.

In 2017 he joined French side Pays d'Aix UC. In 2022 he joined Chambéry Savoie Mont-Blanc Handball.

=== National team ===
He debuted for the Spanish national team on June 13th 2016 against Poland at the age of 28.

At the 2018 Mediterranean Games he won bronze medals with the Spanish team.

At the 2022 European Championship he won a silver medal. He played 9 games, scoring 1 goal. Spain lost the final to Sweden 27:26.

He also represented Spain at the 2023 World Men's Handball Championship. Here he won a bronze medal with the Spanish team.
