= Firas Chaieb =

Qatari handball player (born 1992)

Personal information
- Nationality: Qatari
- Born: 21 July 1992 (age 34)
- Height: 1.94 m (6 ft 4 in)

Sport
- Sport: Handball
- Position: Pivot
- Current club: Al-Duhail
- Number: 17
National team
Years	Team	Apps	(Gls)
–	Qatar	45	(79)

Firas Chaieb (born 21 July 1992) is a Qatari handball player for Al-Duhail and the Qatari national team.

He represented Qatar at the 2019 World Men's Handball Championship.
