= AD Ciudad de Guadalajara =

Spanish handball club

Balonmano Guadalajara
- Full name: Asociación Deportiva Ciudad de Guadalajara
- Nickname(s): Guada, Morados, Violetas
- Founded: 2007; 19 years ago
- Arena: Palacio Multiusos de Guadalajara, Guadalajara
- Capacity: 5,894
- President: Alejandro Ortiz Garrido
- Head coach: Juan Carlos Requena
- League: Liga ASOBAL
- 2024-25: 14th
- Club colours
Home	Away

Asociación Deportiva Ciudad de Guadalajara, also known as BM Guadalajara, is a Spanish handball team based in Guadalajara, that plays in the Liga ASOBAL.

Location of Balonmano Guadalajara

== History ==
The club was founded in 2007 and managed to get promoted to the first division in the Liga ASOBAL in just three seasons. After the 2020/21 First Division season, the club finished 15th and was relegated to the Second Division. After the 2021/22 season of the second division, the team was again promoted to the first division.

== Crest, colours, supporters ==
=== Kit manufacturers ===
Period	Kit manufacturer
2017	(Spain) Rasán
2017 - 2021	(Denmark) Hummel
2021 - present	(Spain) Joma

=== Kits ===
HOME
2014–15	2017–19	2021-22	2022-23

AWAY
2014–15	2022-23

THIRD

2022-23

== Sports Hall information ==
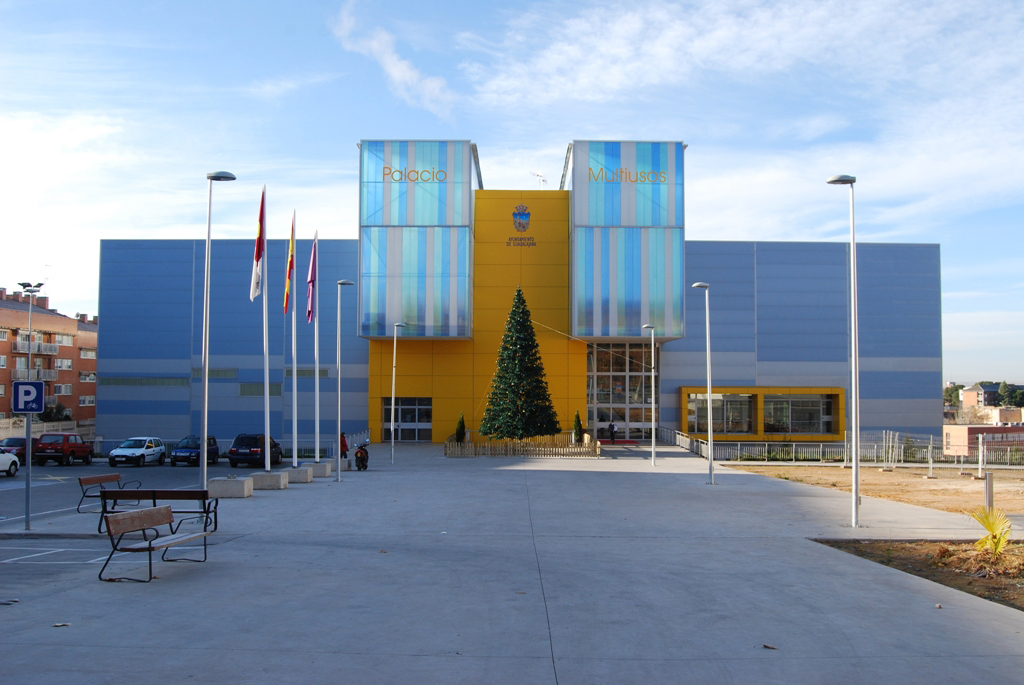
Home hall: Palacio Multiusos de Guadalajara

- Name: – Palacio Multiusos de Guadalajara
- City: – Guadalajara
- Capacity: – 5894
- Address: – Av. de El Vado, 13, 19005, Guadalajara, Spain

== Management ==
Position	Name
President	(Spain) Alejandro Ortiz Garrido
Vice President	(Spain) Fabiola Tejon San Jose
Executive Director	(Spain) Javier Palacios
Member Of The Board	(Spain) Jaime Alvalo Such
Member Of The Board	(Spain) Raquel Alda Jimeno
Member Of The Board	(Spain) David Hernández Hombrados
Member Of The Board	(Spain) Alberto Moranchel Alonso
Member Of The Board	(Spain) José Javier Perdices Calvo

== Team ==
=== Current squad ===
Squad for the 2022–23 season

Balonmano Guadalajara

Goalkeepers

- 1 (Spain) Jesús Ángel Lucía
- 12 (Argentina) Marco Krimer
- 44 (Spain) Daniel Santamaría

Left Wingers

- 5 (Argentina) Francisco Andres Lombardi
- 14 (Spain) José Luis Román
- 18 (Spain) Alberto Moranchel

Right Wingers

- 15 (Spain) Enrique Calvo
- 19 (Brazil) Fábio Chiuffa
- 21 (Spain) Carlos Pérez Muñoz
- 39 (Spain) Santiago Simón Saz

Line Players

- 10 (Spain) Jorge Romanillos
- 23 (Spain) Miguel Llorens
- 29 (Spain) Marcos Dorado
- 55 (Spain) Alvaro Garcia Leon

Central Backs

- 13 (Brazil) Denys Barros
- 33 (Spain) Jesús Arribas
- 51 (Spain) Julián Tarjuelo
- 52 (Spain) Alberto Serradilla

Left Backs

- 7 (Spain) Haitz Gorostidi
- 76 (Portugal) Francisco Oliveira Silva
- 97 (Spain) Alberto Díaz Hernández

Right Backs

- 9 (Spain) Manuel Catalina Falcón

=== Technical staff ===
- Head coach: (Spain) Juan Carlos Requena
- Assistant coach: (Spain) Ricardo Mateo
- Fitness coach: (Spain) Edu Espi
- Physiotherapist: (Spain) Ane Bilbao
- Club Doctor: (Spain) José Ángel Izquierdo Alises

=== Transfers ===
Transfers for the 2026–27 season

Joining

- (Spain) Julen Urruzola (LP) from (Spain) BM Puerto Sagunto
- (Spain) Ramón Fuentes (GK) from (Spain) BM Proin Triana
- (Spain) Eduardo Reig-Guillén (LW) from (Spain) CB Nava

Leaving

- (Egypt) Ahmed Elkhouga (RB) to (Portugal) Póvoa AC
- (Hungary) (Romania) Dániel Fekete (LB) to (Hungary) Rákosmenti KSK

=== Transfer History ===
Transfers for the 2025–26 season

Joining

- (Egypt) Ahmed Elkhouga (RB) from (Spain) SD Atlético Novás
- (Croatia) David Vladić (GK) from (Croatia) RK Poreč
- (Hungary) (Romania) Dániel Fekete (LB) from (Finland) Riihimäki Cocks
- (Spain) Martín Ganuza Jorge (LW) from (Spain) Helvetia Anaitasuna

Leaving

- (Argentina) Francisco Andrés Lombardi (LW) to (Spain) CB Ciudad de Logroño
- (Spain) Vicente Poveda (LB) to (Spain) BM Villa de Aranda
- (Spain) Miguel Llorens (LP) to (Spain) Balonmano Triana
- (Spain) Gerard Forns (GK) to (Spain) Balonmano Burgos
- (Spain) Alberto Serradilla (CB) to (Spain) BM Puerto Sagunto
- (Poland) Jakub Sladkowski (LP) loan back to (Spain) CD Bidasoa

Transfers for the 2022–23 season

Joining

- (Brazil) Denys Barros (CB) from (Brazil) Handebol Clube Taubaté
- (Spain) Miguel Llorens (LP) from (France) Valence Handball
- (Portugal) Francisco Oliveira Silva (LB) from (Portugal) Vitória Setubal
- (Spain) Enrique Calvo (RW) from (Spain) BM Villa de Aranda

Leaving

- (Spain) Juan Marmesat (RB) to (Spain) CB Soria
- (North Macedonia) Dario Petrovski (CB) to (Italy) Junior Fasano
- (Bosnia and Herzegovina) Kemal Hamzić (CB) to (Finland) Riihimäki Cocks
- (Spain) Luis Aybar (LP)

== Previous squads ==
2019–2020 Team
Shirt No	Nationality	Player	Birth Date	Position
1	Iran	Saeid Barkhordari	7 May 1989 (age 37)	Goalkeeper
3	North Macedonia	Kostadin Petrov	30 March 1992 (age 34)	Line Player
5	Spain	Antonio Serradilla	10 January 1999 (age 27)	Left Back
7	Spain	Javier Chacón Ocaña	13 February 2002 (age 24)	Left Back
8	Spain	Chema Márquez	20 December 1996 (age 29)	Central Back
9	Spain	Victor Montoya Armengol	22 March 1990 (age 36)	Central Back
10	Brazil	Arthur William De Souza Pereira	10 April 1995 (age 31)	Right Back
13	Spain	Alberto Sanz García	6 March 1998 (age 28)	Right Back
15	Spain	Pedro Fuentes Sanchez-Migallon	22 June 1986 (age 40)	Line Player
18	Spain	Inigo Barricart Dorval	30 August 1995 (age 31)	Left Winger
20	Spain	Ignacio Moya Del Saz	10 May 1993 (age 33)	Right Winger
21	Spain	Jaime Gallardo	2 December 1998 (age 27)	Right Winger
22	Spain	Pablo Paredes	5 March 1995 (age 31)	Left Back
24	Spain	Jorge Romanillos	6 January 2001 (age 25)	Line Player
28	Spain	Javier Bodí	9 May 2001 (age 25)	Central Back
29	Spain	José Luis Román	31 March 2002 (age 24)	Left Winger
32	Cuba	Dariel García Rivera	31 December 1996 (age 29)	Left Winger
44	Spain	Daniel Santamaría	19 January 2001 (age 25)	Goalkeeper
47	Spain	José Javier Hombrados	7 April 1972 (age 54)	Goalkeeper
65	Spain	Juan Marmesat	28 February 2001 (age 25)	Right Back

2017–2018 Team
Shirt No	Nationality	Player	Birth Date	Position
1	Spain	Carlos Donderis	2 August 1992 (age 34)	Goalkeeper
2	Spain	Javier Parra	10 January 1983 (age 43)	Left Winger
3	Spain	Chema Celada	22 April 1996 (age 30)	Central Back
4	Spain	Sergio Mellado Sanchez	5 April 1989 (age 37)	Central Back
6	Brazil	Lucas Cândido	19 March 1989 (age 37)	Right Winger
8	Spain	Chema Márquez	20 December 1996 (age 29)	Central Back
9	Spain	Victor Montoya Armengol	22 March 1990 (age 36)	Central Back
10	Argentina	Agustín Vidal	8 July 1987 (age 39)	Left Back
13	Spain	Alberto Sanz García	6 March 1998 (age 28)	Right Back
14	Spain	Victor Vigo Gerpe	9 May 1984 (age 42)	Central Back
15	Spain	José Bozalongo	4 March 1985 (age 41)	Left Back
16	Spain	Adrián Eceolaza	5 April 1995 (age 31)	Goalkeeper
17	Spain	Pedro Fuentes Sanchez-Migallon	22 June 1986 (age 40)	Line Player
19	Spain	Jairo Pina	25 August 1999 (age 27)	Central Back
20	Spain	Ignacio Moya Del Saz	10 May 1993 (age 33)	Right Winger
21	Spain	Jaime Gallardo	2 December 1998 (age 27)	Right Winger
22	Spain	Javier García Rubio	7 January 1990 (age 36)	Line Player
24	Spain	Daniel Sedano Sánchez	24 January 1997 (age 29)	Line Player
27	Spain	Sergio Valles Fernández	27 August 1981 (age 45)	Right Back
32	Spain	Cesar Gómez Sánchez	1 January 1996 (age 30)	Goalkeeper
47	Spain	José Javier Hombrados	7 April 1972 (age 54)	Goalkeeper
48	Spain	Javier Casasnovas	1 January 2000 (age 26)	Left Winger
63	Spain	Ramos Padilla	1 January 1989 (age 37)	Central Back
93	Spain	Pablo Simón Saz	13 October 1999 (age 27)	Left Back

== Season by season ==
Season	Tier	Division	Pos.	Notes
2007–08	3	1ª Estatal	2nd	Promoted
2008–09	2	Honor B	4th	
2009–10	2	Plata	2nd	Promoted
2010–11	1	ASOBAL	13th	
2011–12	1	ASOBAL	14th	
2012–13	1	ASOBAL	13th	
2013–14	1	ASOBAL	8th	
2014–15	1	ASOBAL	11th	
2015–16	1	ASOBAL	11th	
2016–17	1	ASOBAL	10th	
2017–18	1	ASOBAL	8th	
2018–19	1	ASOBAL	12th	

Season	Tier	Division	Pos.	Notes
2019–20	1	ASOBAL	7th	
2020–21	1	ASOBAL	15th	Relegated
2021–22	1	Plata	1st	Promoted
2022–23	1	ASOBAL	15th	Relegated
2023–24	1	Plata	1st	Promoted
2024–25	1	ASOBAL	14th	

== EHF ranking ==
As of 14/12/2022

Rank	Team	Points
278	(Sweden) Lugi HF	4
279	(Netherlands) HV Aalsmeer	4
280	(Spain) Balonmano Sinfín	3
281	(Spain) Balonmano Guadalajara	3
282	(France) US Ivry Handball	3
283	(Hungary) Mezőkövesdi KC	3

== Former club members ==
=== Notable former players ===
- (Spain) Mateo Garralda (2011–2012)
- (Spain) José Javier Hombrados (2015–2021)
- (Spain) Chema Márquez (2014–2020)
- (Spain) Pablo Paredes (2018–2021)
- (Spain) Iñaki Peciña (2014–2015)
- (Spain) Javier García Rubio (2017–2018)
- (Spain) Valero Rivera (2008–2009)
- (Argentina) Gastón Mouriño (2020–2021)
- (Argentina) Agustín Vidal (2010–2011, 2017–2018)
- (Brazil) César Almeida (2013–2015)
- (Brazil) Lucas Cândido (2016–2018)
- (Brazil) Fábio Chiuffa (2014–2016, 2022–)
- (Brazil) Alexandro Pozzer (2013–2016)
- (Brazil) Ales Abrao Silva (2013–2014, 2015–2016)
- (Brazil) Guilherme Valadão Gama (2013–2014)
- (Croatia) Alen Blažević (2011–2012)
- (Iran) Saeid Barkhordari (2019–2020)
- (Italy) Giacomo Savini (2020–2021)
- (North Macedonia) Kostadin Petrov (2019–2020)
- (Poland) Paweł Niewrzawa (2018–2019)
- (Serbia) Draško Nenadić (2012–2013)
- (Slovakia) Stanislav Demovič (2009-2011)

=== Former coaches ===
Seasons	Coach	Country
2007–2012	Fernando Bolea	(Spain)
2012–2014	Mateo Garralda	(Spain)
2014–2019	César Montes	(Spain)
2019-2021	Mariano Ortega	(Spain)
2021	Rodrigo Reñones	(Spain)
2021–	Juan Carlos Requena	(Spain)
