= Takayuki Shimuzu =

Japanese handball player (born 1983)

Personal information
- Nationality: Japanese
- Born: 27 August 1983 (age 43)
- Height: 1.86 m (6 ft 1 in)

Sport
- Sport: Handball
- Position: Goalkeeper
- Current club: Wakunaga Leolic
National team
Years	Team	Apps	(Gls)
–	Japan	25	(0)

Takayuki Shimizu (志水 孝行, Shimizu Takayuki; born 27 August 1983) is a Japanese handball player for Wakunaga Leolic and the Japanese national team.

He participated at the 2017 World Men's Handball Championship.
