= Gilberto Figueira =

Angolan handball player

Personal information
- Full name: Gilberto Víctor Figueira
- Nationality: Angolan
- Born: 25 January 1988 (age 38)
- Height: 2.00 m (6 ft 6 1/2 in)

Sport
- Sport: Handball
- Position: Goalkeeper
- Current club: Marinha de Guerra
National team
Years	Team	Apps	(Gls)
–	Angola	5	(0)

Gilberto Víctor Figueira, nicknamed Uaué, (born 25 January 1988) is an Angolan handball player for Marinha de Guerra and the Angolan national team.

He participated at the 2017 World Men's Handball Championship.
