= Al Duhail SC (handball) =

Athletic Handball Team

Al Duhail
- Full name: Al Duhail Handball Team
- Nickname: The Red Knights
- Founded: 2009; 16 years ago as Lekhwiya; 2017; 8 years ago as Al-Duhail
- Arena: Abdullah bin Khalifa Stadium; Doha
- Capacity: 9,000
- President: Sheikh Khalifa bin Hamad bin Khalifa Al Thani
- League: Qatar Handball League
Home	Away

Al Duhail Handball Team (Arabic: فريق الدحيل لكرة اليد), formerly Lekhwiya, is the handball team of Al-Duhail SC, based in the capital city of Doha, Qatar. It currently competes in the Qatar Handball League (QHL) and was founded in 2013. It plays its home games at the Abdullah bin Khalifa Stadium.

== History ==
The idea to form Lekhwiya's handball division began in April 2012 when the Qatar Handball Federation wanted to increase the number of teams participating in the league. Lekhwiya were presented with an opportunity to form a handball team and participate in the first division, and the president of the club, Abdullah Al Thani, accepted. Jabbes Ibrahim was selected as the first coach of the team.

In April 2017, the club took over El Jaish SC and rebranded the club into Al-Duhail SC.

== Honours ==
- Qatar Handball League

Winners (4): 2012–13 (as Lekhwiya), 2017–18, 2020–21, 2021–22 Amir cup 2021-22

== Managerial history ==
- (Tunisia) Jabbes Ibrahim (April 2012 – July 2013)
- (Algeria) Ibrahim Budrala (July 2013 – January 2015 )
- (Croatia) Sead Hasanefendić (February 2015)

== Notable former players ==
- Fawaz Al-Moadhadi
- Taleb Ali
- Alaya Khaled
- Allaedine Berrached
- Abdelrahman Abdalla
- Hani Tanban
- Shadi Hamdoun
- Khaled Al Hashimi
- Bertrand Roiné
- Rafael Capote
- Ismail Abdulaal
- Ghanem Al Ali
- Yousef Al Maalem
- Ahmad Madadi
- Khaled Al Swaidi
- Bilal Lepenica
- Sergey Zhedik
- Amine Guehis
- Abdulla Ramadan
- Firas Chaieb
- Christian Dissinger
- Hamdi Haj Ayed
