= Kairi Kochi =

Japanese handball player (born 1985)

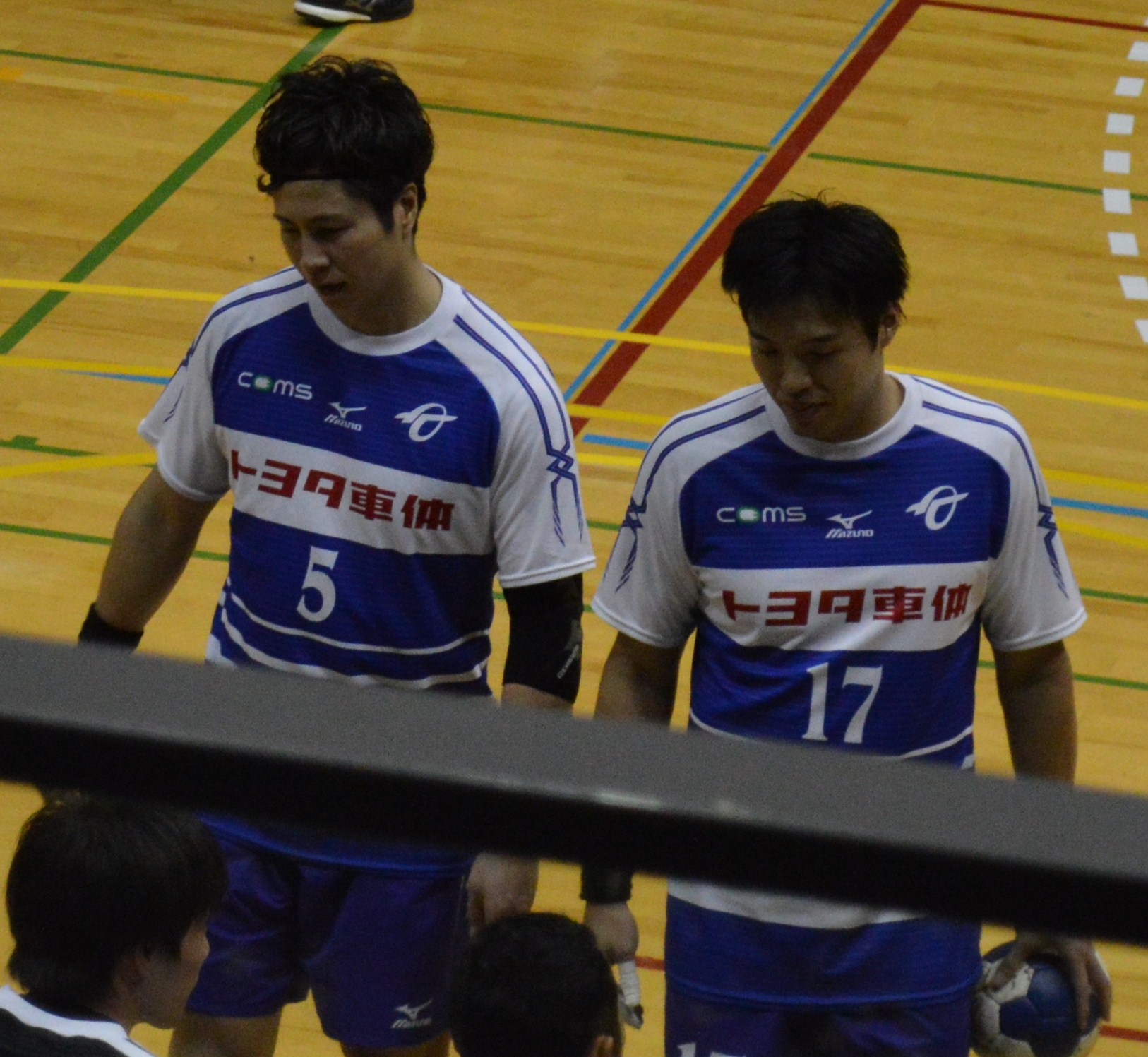
- Kochi (left) in 2016

Personal information
- Nationality: Japanese
- Born: 22 January 1985 (age 41)
- Height: 1.86 m (6 ft 1 in)

Sport
- Sport: Handball
- Position: Right back
- Current club: Toyota Auto Body
National team
Years	Team	Apps	(Gls)
–	Japan	73	(178)

Kairi Kochi (高智 海吏, Kōchi Kairi; born 22 January 1985) is a Japanese handball player for Toyota Auto Body and the Japanese national team.

He participated at the 2017 World Men's Handball Championship.
