= Daichi Komuro =

Japanese handball player (born 1988)

Personal information
- Nationality: Japanese
- Born: 28 June 1988 (age 38)
- Height: 1.88 m (6 ft 2 in)

Sport
- Sport: Handball
- Position: Pivot
- Current club: Osaki Osol
National team
Years	Team	Apps	(Gls)
–	Japan	25	(16)

Daichi Komuro (born 28 June 1988) is a Japanese handball player for Osaki Osol and the Japanese national team.

He participated at the 2017 World Men's Handball Championship.
