= Washington Nunes =

Brazilian handball coach

Washington Nunes Silva Junior (born 18 November 1962) is a Brazilian handball coach. He trained the Brazilian national team between 2016 and 2019.
