= Ali Khamis (handballer) =

Bahraini handball player

Personal information
- Full name: Ali Khamis Isa
- Nationality: Bahraini
- Born: 9 August 1986 (age 40)
- Height: 1.92 m (6 ft 4 in)

Sport
- Sport: Handball
- Position: Goalkeeper
- Current club: Ettifaq
- Number: 86
National team
Years	Team	Apps	(Gls)
–	Bahrain	50	(5)
Medal record
Asian Championship
Silver medal – second place	2018 South Korea

Ali Khamis Isa (born 9 August 1986) is a Bahraini handball player for Ettifaq and the Bahraini national team.

He participated at the 2017 World Men's Handball Championship.
