= Husain Al-Qaidoom =

Bahraini handball player

Personal information
- Full name: Husain Jasim Al-Qaidoom
- Nationality: Bahraini
- Born: 21 November 1986 (age 39)
- Height: 1.65 m (5 ft 5 in)

Sport
- Sport: Handball
- Position: Goalkeeper
- Current club: Bahrain SC
National team
Years	Team	Apps	(Gls)
–	Bahrain	30	(0)

Husain Jasim Al-Qaidoom (born 21 November 1986) is a Bahraini handball player for Bahrain SC and the Bahraini national team.

He participated at the 2017 World Men's Handball Championship.
