= Ahmed Al-Maqabi =

Bahraini handball player

Personal information
- Full name: Ahmed Jassim Al-Maqabi
- Nationality: Bahraini
- Born: 26 October 1994 (age 32)
- Height: 1.75 m (5 ft 9 in)

Sport
- Sport: Handball
- Position: Center back
- Current club: Al-Najma
- Number: 50
National team
Years	Team	Apps	(Gls)
–	Bahrain	45	(165)
Medal record
Asian Championship
Silver medal – second place	2022 Saudi Arabia

Ahmed Jassim Al-Maqabi (Arabic: أحمد جاسم المقابي, born 26 October 1994) is a Bahraini handball player for Al-Najma and the Bahraini national team.

He participated at the 2017 World Men's Handball Championship and at the delayed 2020 Summer Olympics.
