= Bertrand Roiné =

Qatari handball player (born 1981)

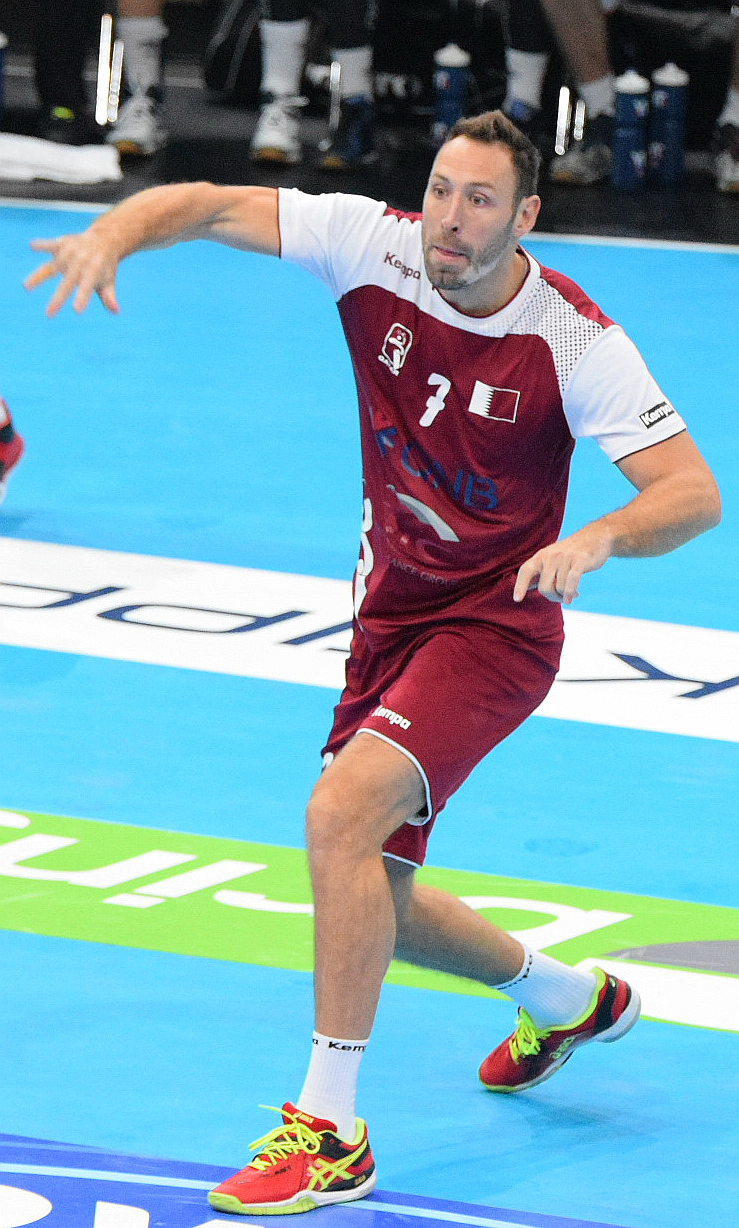
- Roiné in 2016

Personal information
- Nationality: French/Qatari
- Born: 17 February 1981 (age 45) Sainte-Gemmes-d'Andigné, France
- Height: 1.98 m (6 ft 6 in)

Sport
- Sport: Handball
- Position: Left back
- Current club: Retired

Youth career
- Years: Team
- 1987–1998: Noyant la Gravoyère

Senior clubs
- Years: Team
- 1998–2004: Angers Noyant HB
- 2004–2006: Dunkerque HGL
- 2006–2012: Chambéry Savoie HB
- 2012–2014: Al-Duhail
- 2014–2016: Al Ahli SC
- 2016–2019: Al-Duhail
- 1998–2004: Al Ahli SC
- 2019–2021: al-Wakrah
National team
Years	Team	Apps	(Gls)
2005-2013	France	20	(40)
2013-2021	Qatar	76	(165)
Medal record
Representing France
World Championship
Gold medal – first place	2011 Sweden
Representing Qatar
World Championship
Silver medal – second place	2015 Qatar
Asian Championship
Gold medal – first place	2014 Bahrain
Gold medal – first place	2018 South Korea

Bertrand Roiné (born 17 February 1981) is a French-born Qatari former handball player who played for first the French national team and later for the Qatari national team. At the 2011 World Championship he won gold medals with France.

== National team ==
Roine played for the French national team from 2005 onwards. He represented them at the 2010 European Men's Handball Championship.

At the 2011 World Championship he won gold medals with 'Les Experts'.

He switched allegiance to Qatar in 2013 and played his first match for the Qatari national team in October 2013. His first tournament with Qatar was the 2014 Asian Championship where Qatar won gold medals.

He was part of the Qatar team that won silver medals at the 2015 World Championship in Qatar, the first World Championship medal for both Qatar and for any Asian team. The result was however controversial due to the many naturalized players of Qatar, of which Roiné was one of them. According to the Frankfurter Allgemeine, only four of the 17 players in the squad were native to Qatar. The practice was criticised by Austrian goalkeeper after his team's loss to Qatar in the round of 16, saying "It [felt] like playing against a world selection team" and "I think it is not the sense of a world championship." Furthermore there were claims of favourable refereering for the hosts. After the final whistle of their semifinal against Poland, the Polish players showed their discontent by ironically applauding the three referees.

He also represented Qatar at the 2019 World Championship.

== Club career ==
Roiné played for Angers Noyant HB from 1998 to 2004 where he joined Dunkerque HGL. Two years later he joined Chambéry Savoie HB.

in 2012 he signed for Al-Duhail in Qatar. He won the Qatar Handball League in 2013.

He retired in 2021.

== Gallery ==
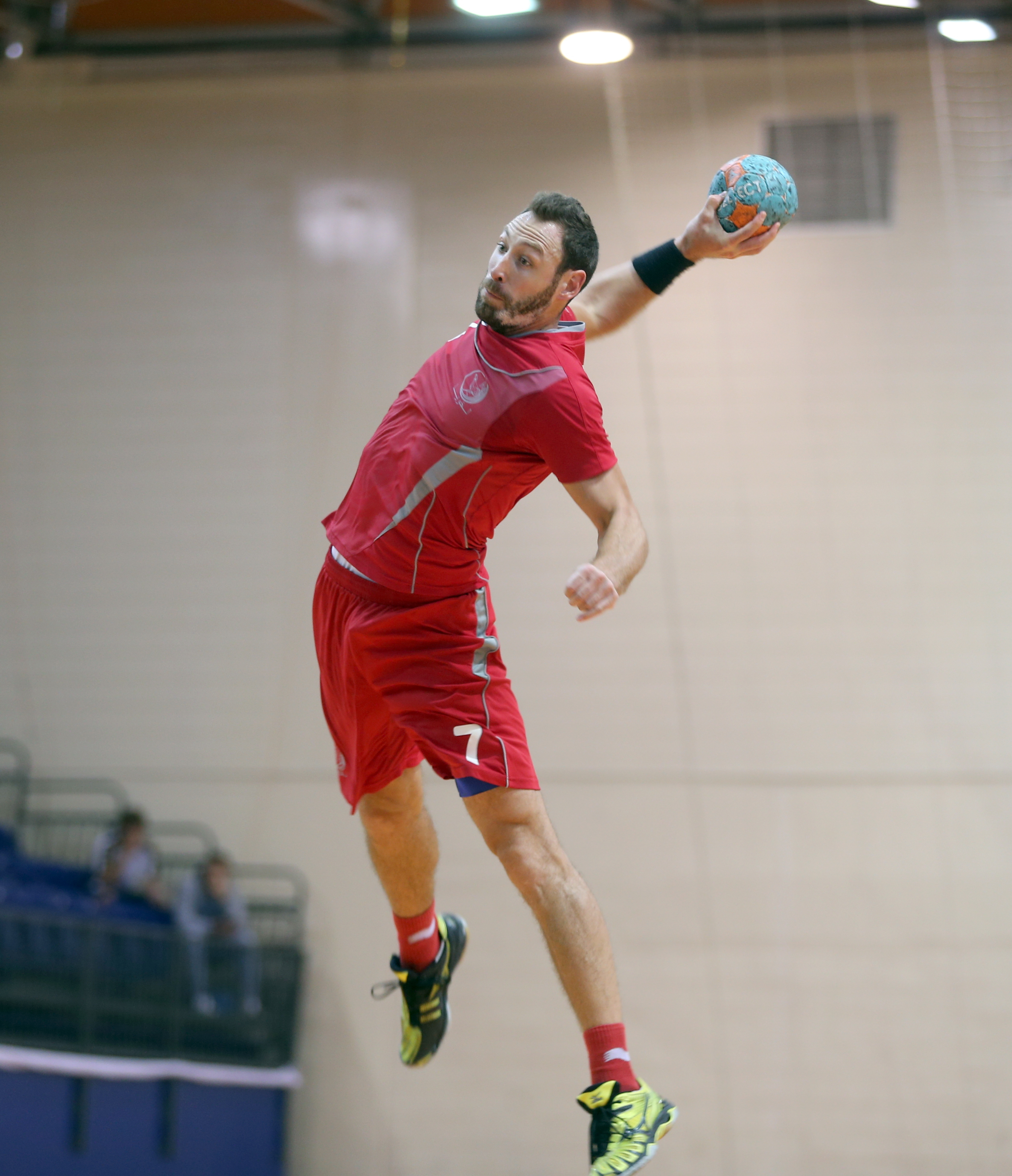

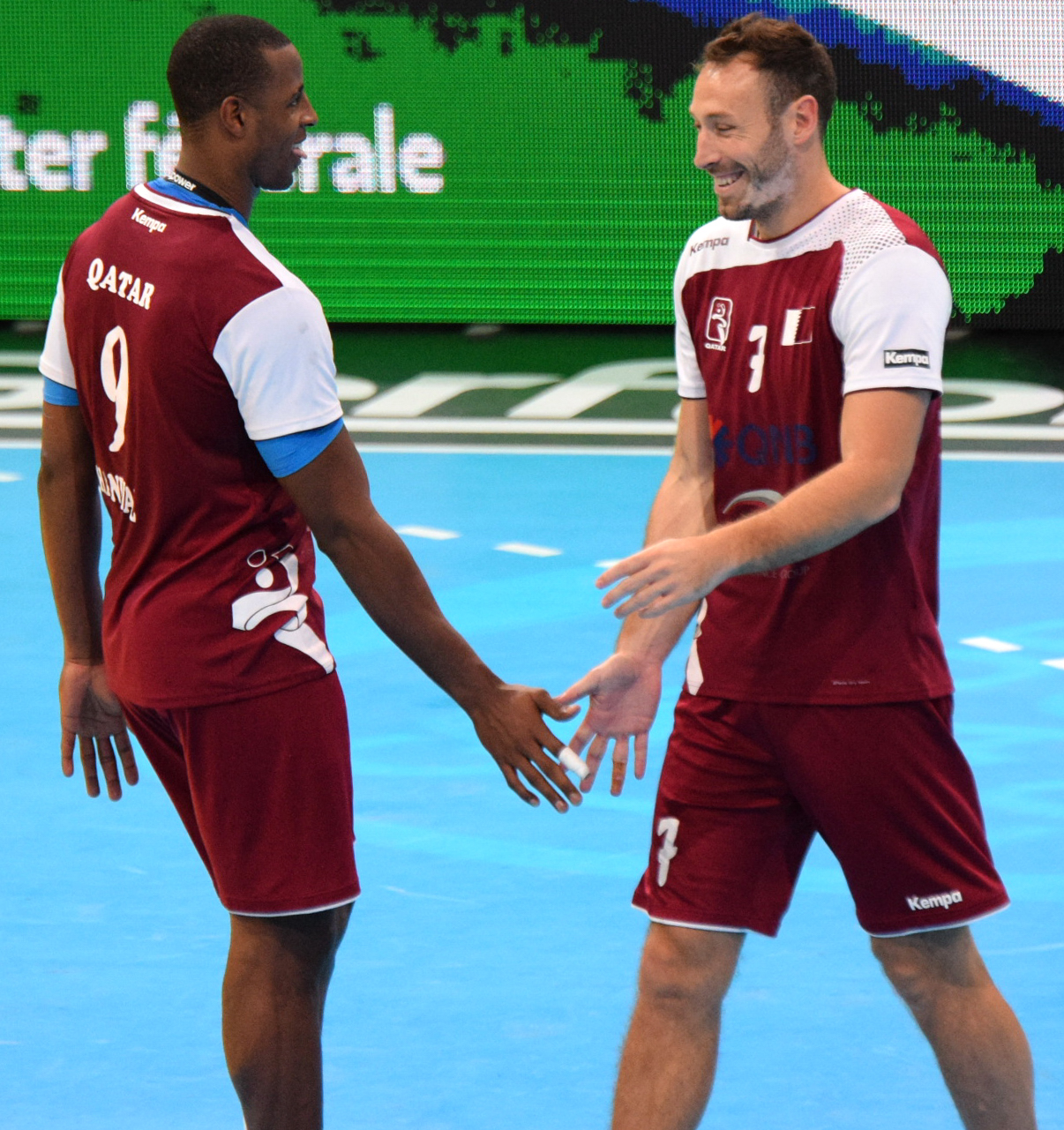

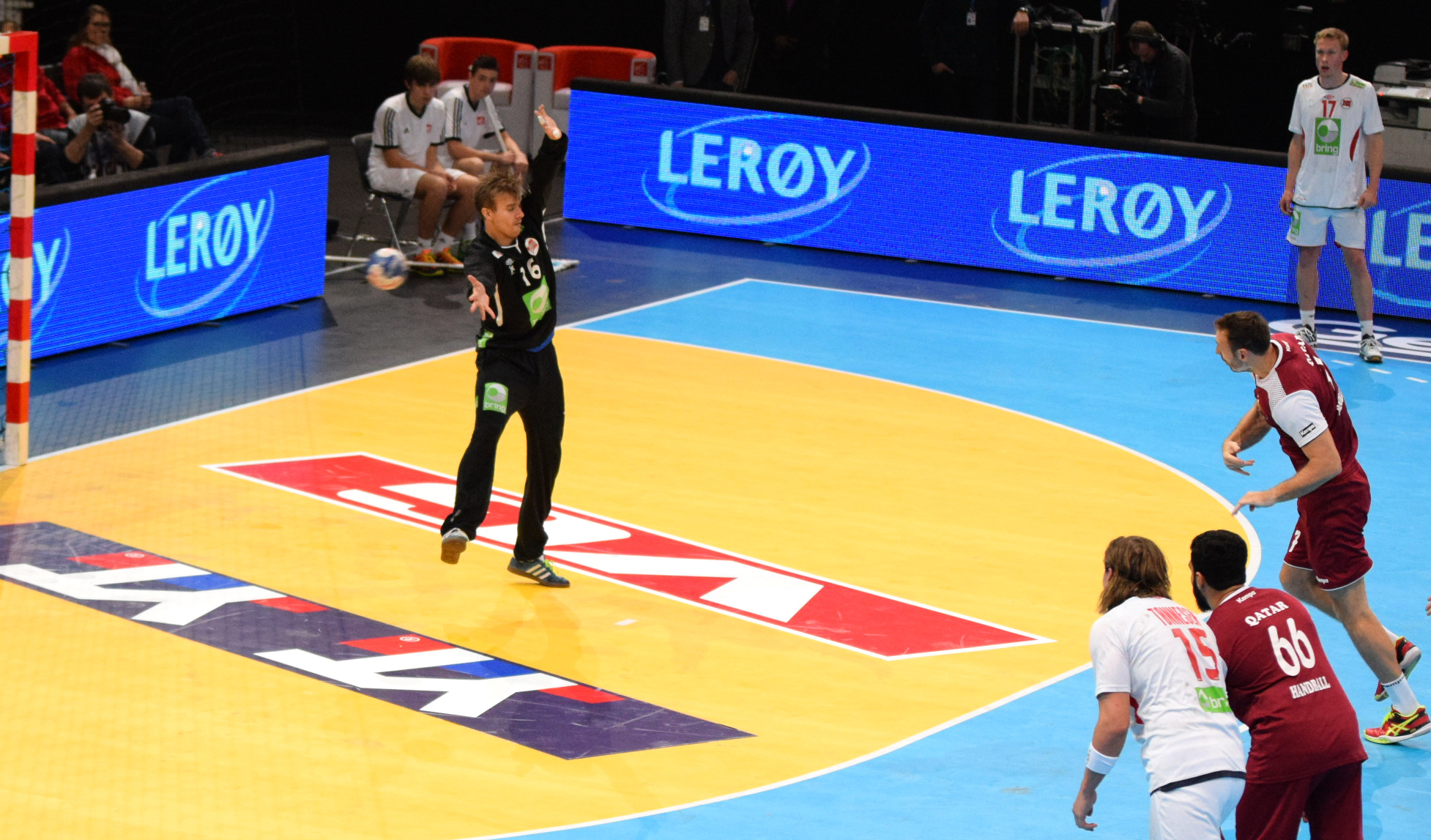

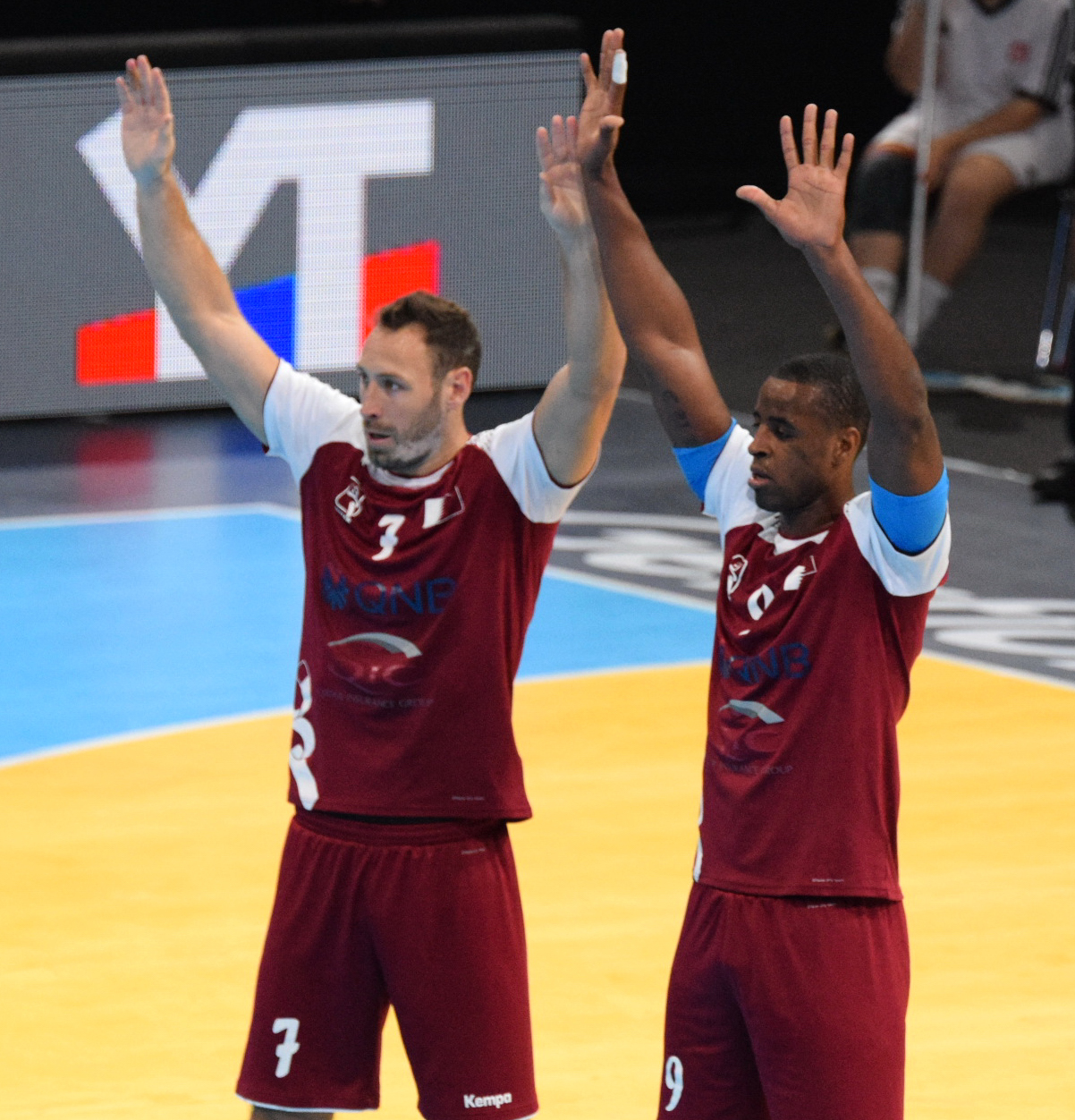

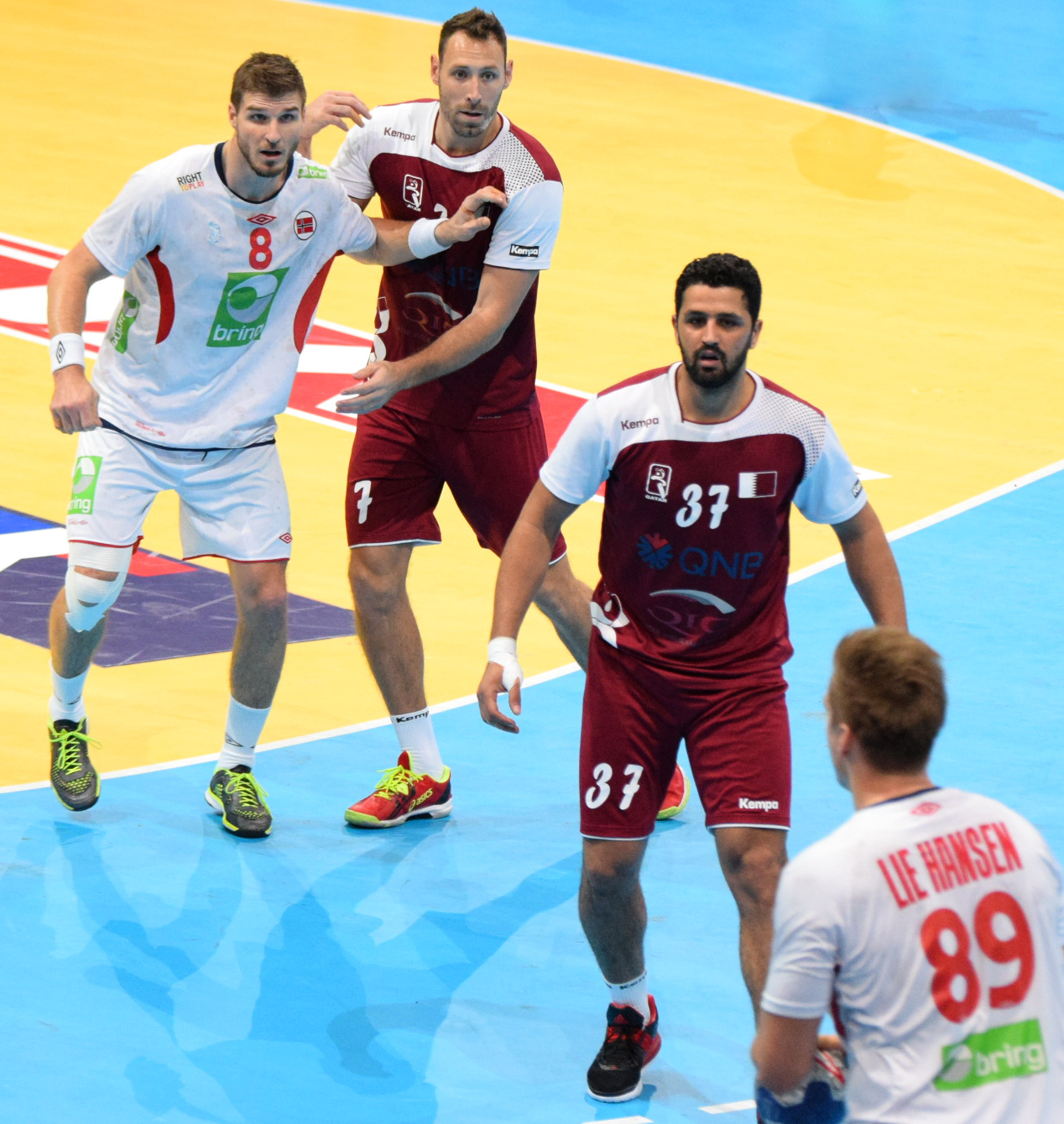
