= Osaki Osol =

Japanese handball club

Osaki OSOL is a men's Handball club based in Miyoshi, Saitama, Japan. It plays in the Japan Handball League (JHL), Japan's top-flight league. It is a nonprofessional club owned by Osaki Electric Co. Ltd. Osol means "the core of the earth" in Italian.

== Club history ==
The Osaki OSOL handball team was founded in 1960. As of August 2007, they have won the JHL title once, the All Japan Open Championship title nine times, the All Japan Non-Professional Championship 13 times, and the National Sports Festival of Japan title 14 times.

== Former players ==
- Remi Anri Doi (2019-2021)
- Masatake Kimura
- Daichi Komuro
- Daisuke Miyazaki (2003–2009 and 2010–2019)
- Hiroki Motoki
- Hiroki Shida
- Kento Uegaki
