= Remi Anri Doi =

Japanese handball player (born 1989)

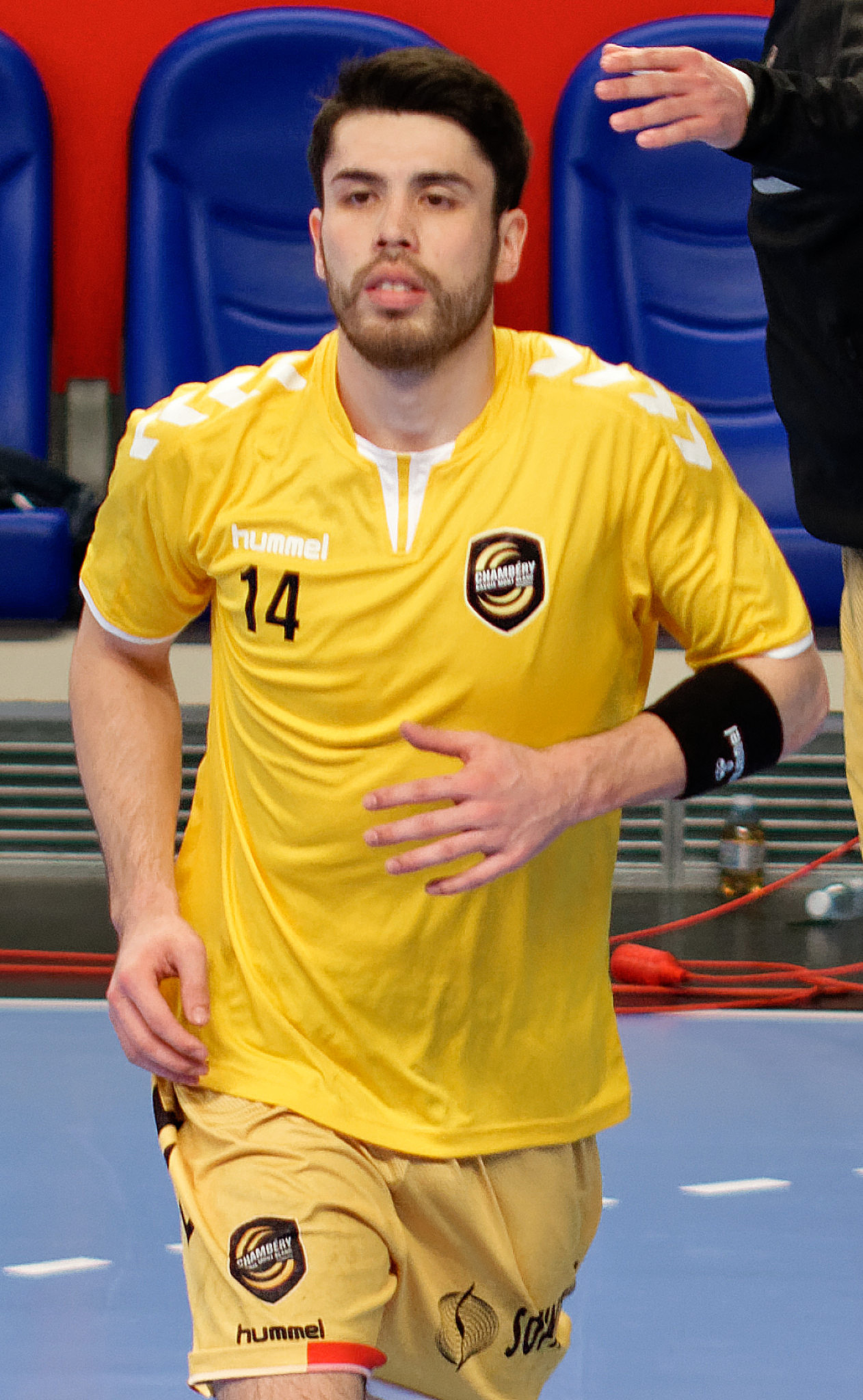

Personal information
- Nationality: Japanese
- Born: 28 September 1989 (age 37) Paris, France
- Height: 1.80 m (5 ft 11 in)

Sport
- Sport: Handball
- Position: Left wing
- Current club: Zeekstar Tokyo
- Number: 14

Senior clubs
- Years: Team
- 2013-2017: (France) Chambéry Savoie HB
- 2017-2019: (France) Chartres MHB28
- 2019-2021: (Japan) Osaki Osol
- 2021-: (Japan) Zeekstar Tokyo
National team
Years	Team	Apps	(Gls)
–	Japan	32	(77)
Medal record
Asian Championship
Bronze medal – third place	2020 Kuwait

Remi Anri Doi, also called Rémi Feutrier (土井 杏利, Doi Anri; born 28 September 1989) is a French-born Japanese handball player for C' Chartres Métropole handball and the Japanese national team.

He participated at the 2017 World Men's Handball Championship.

== Early life ==
Doi was born in Paris to a French father and a Japanese mother. He moved to Japan at the age of three and began playing handball at nine. He later played at Nippon Sport Science University. A knee injury at the age of 22 led him to stop playing, and he moved to France to learn the language and explore other career options.

== Club career ==
In 2012, Doi moved to Chambéry, where he resumed playing after his knee symptoms improved. He initially trained with the reserve team of Chambéry Savoie Handball and signed his first professional contract in 2013. Known in France as Rémi Feutrier, he changed from a backcourt player to a winger and established himself in the first team during the 2014 - 2015 season.

In February 2017, he signed a two-year contract with Chartres, effective that July. The club was then playing in the ProLigue, the second tier of French handball.

Doi returned to Japan in 2019 to join Osaki Osol. After two seasons with the club, he moved to Zeekstar Tokyo in 2021.

He retired at the end of the 2023 - 1924 season. His final competitive appearance came in May 2024, when Zeekstar Tokyo lost to Toyota Auto Body Brave Kings in the second stage of the Japan Handball League play-offs.

Doi joined the Japanese national team in 2015 and made his World Championship debut in 2017. He also competed at the 2019 and 2021 championships.

At the 2020 Asian Championship in Kuwait, Japan won the bronze medal and Doi was selected as the tournament's best left wing.

He captained Japan at the Tokyo Olympic tournament, held in 2021. Japan defeated Portugal 31–30 for its first Olympic win in men's handball since 1988, but was eliminated in the group stage. On 4 August 2021, Doi announced his retirement from international handball.
