= Paweł Niewrzawa =

Polish handball player (born 1992)

Personal information
- Nationality: Polish
- Born: 28 September 1992 (age 34) Gdańsk, Poland
- Height: 1.89 m (6 ft 2 in)

Sport
- Sport: Handball
- Position: Centre back

Senior clubs
- Years: Team
- 2008–2011: SMS Gdańsk
- 2011–2012: MKS Nielba Wągrowiec
- 2012–2014: Vive Kielce
- 2012–2014: → TuS Nettelstedt-Lübbecke (loan)
- 2014–2016: NMC Górnik Zabrze
- 2016–2017: Wybrzeże Gdańsk
- 2017–2018: HF Springe
- 2018–2019: BM Guadalajara
National team
| Years | Team | Apps | (Gls) |
| 2014– | Poland | 8 | (5) |

Paweł Niewrzawa (born 28 September 1992) is a Polish handball player for the Polish national team. He is currently a free agent.

He participated at the 2017 World Men's Handball Championship.
