= Sebastien Dechamps =

Argentine handball player

Personal information
- Nationality: Argentine
- Born: 12 January 1994 (age 32)
- Height: 1.84 m (6 ft 1/2 in)

Sport
- Sport: Handball
- Position: Left back
- Current club: Quilmes
National team
Years	Team	Apps	(Gls)
–	Argentina	15	(65)
Medal record
Pan American Junior Championship
Silver medal – second place	2015 Brazil

Sebastien Dechamps (born 12 January 1994) is an Argentine handball player for Quilmes and the Argentine national team.

He participated at the 2017 World Men's Handball Championship.
