= Hiroki Motoki =

Japanese handball player (born 1992)

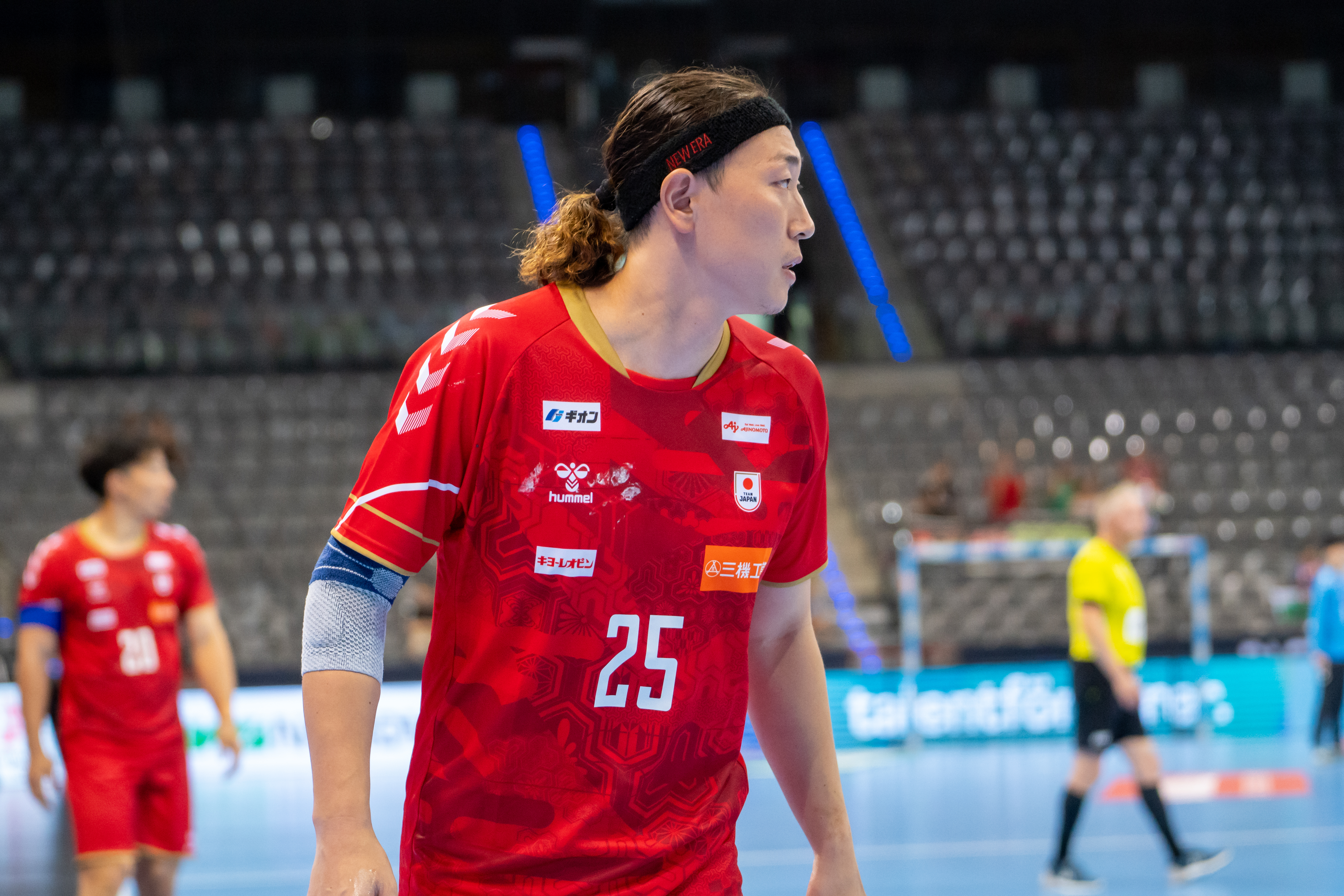

Personal information
- Nationality: Japanese
- Born: 14 February 1992 (age 34)
- Height: 1.82 m (6 ft 0 in)

Sport
- Sport: Handball
- Position: Right wing
- Current club: Osaki Osol
National team
Years	Team	Apps	(Gls)
–	Japan	63	(166)
Medal record
Asian Championship
Bronze medal – third place	2020 Kuwait

Hiroki Motoki (元木 博紀, Motoki Shida; born 14 February 1992) is a Japanese handball player for Osaki Osol and the Japanese national team.

He participated at the 2017 World Men's Handball Championship.
