= Abdelrahman Abdalla =

Qatari handball player (born 1994)

Personal information
- Nationality: Qatari
- Born: 1 January 1994 (age 32)
- Height: 1.89 m (6 ft 2 1/2 in)

Sport
- Sport: Handball
- Position: Centre back
- Current club: Al-Duhail
- Number: 55
National team
Years	Team	Apps	(Gls)
–	Qatar	23	(38)
Medal record
Men's handball
Representing Qatar
Asian Games
Gold medal – first place	2022 Hangzhou	Team
Silver medal – second place	2026 Aichi–Nagoya	Team
Islamic Solidarity Games
Gold medal – first place	2021 Konya

Abdelrahman Abdalla (born 1 January 1994) is a Qatari handball player for Al-Duhail and the Qatari national team.

He participated at the 2017 World Men's Handball Championship.
