= Fahad Al-Farhan (handballer) =

Saudi Arabian handball player

Personal information
- Nationality: Saudi Arabian
- Born: 25 October 1995 (age 30)
- Height: 1.76 m (5 ft 9 in)

Sport
- Sport: Handball
- Position: Centre back
- Current club: Al-Rawdhah
National team
Years	Team	Apps	(Gls)
–	Saudi Arabia	16	(6)

Fahad Al-Farhan (Arabic: فهد الفرحان; born 25 October 1995) is a Saudi Arabian handball player for Al-Rawdhah and the Saudi Arabian national team.

He participated at the 2017 World Men's Handball Championship.
