= Goki Koshio =

Japanese handball player

Personal information
- Nationality: Japanese
- Born: 18 September 1991 (age 35)
- Height: 1.82 m (5 ft 11 1/2 in)

Sport
- Sport: Handball
- Position: Left wing
- Current club: Toyoda Gosei
National team
Years	Team	Apps	(Gls)
–	Japan	3	(7)

Goki Koshio (小塩 豪紀, Koshio Gouki; born 29 April 1987) is a Japanese handball player for Toyoda Gosei and the Japanese national team.

He participated at the 2017 World Men's Handball Championship.
