= Hassan Al-Khadrawi =

Saudi Arabian handball player

Personal information
- Nationality: Saudi Arabian
- Born: 2 March 1990 (age 36)
- Height: 1.74 m (5 ft 8 1/2 in)

Sport
- Sport: Handball
- Position: Centre back
- Current club: Mudhar
National team
Years	Team	Apps	(Gls)
–	Saudi Arabia	18	(46)
Medal record
Asian Championship
Bronze medal – third place	2022 Saudi Arabia

Hassan Al-Khadrawi (Arabic: حسن الخضراوي; born 2 March 1990) is a Saudi Arabian handball player for Mudhar and the Saudi Arabian national team.

He participated at the 2017 World Men's Handball Championship.
