= Agustín Vidal =

Argentine handball player

Personal information
- Born: 8 July 1987 (age 39) Viedma, Argentina
- Height: 1.94 m (6 ft 4 in)

Sport
- Sport: Handball
- Position: Left back
- Current club: BM Maristas
National team
Years	Team	Apps	(Gls)
–	Argentina	80	(162)
Medal record
Pan American Championship
Bronze medal – third place	2016 Argentina

Agustín Vidal (born 8 July 1987) is an Argentine handball player for BM Maristas and defended Argentina at the 2015 World Men's Handball Championship in Qatar.
