= Kento Uegaki =

Japanese handball player (born 1990)

Personal information
- Nationality: Japanese
- Born: 17 October 1990 (age 36)
- Height: 1.80 m (5 ft 11 in)

Sport
- Sport: Handball
- Position: Centre back
- Current club: Osaki Osol
National team
Years	Team	Apps	(Gls)
–	Japan	16	(48)

Kento Uegaki (植垣 健人, Uegaki Kento; born 17 October 1990) is a Japanese handball player for Osaki Osol and the Japanese national team.

He participated at the 2017 World Men's Handball Championship.
