= Nawaf Al-Mutairi (handballer) =

Saudi Arabian handball player

Personal information
- Nationality: Saudi Arabian
- Born: 13 April 1989 (age 37)
- Height: 1.90 m (6 ft 3 in)

Sport
- Sport: Handball
- Position: Goalkeeper
- Current club: Al-Wehda
National team
Years	Team	Apps	(Gls)
–	Saudi Arabia	7	(0)

Nawaf Al-Mutairi (Arabic: نواف المطيري; born 13 April 1989) is a Saudi Arabian handball player for Al-Wehda and the Saudi Arabian national team.

He participated at the 2017 World Men's Handball Championship.
