= Masatake Kimura =

Japanese handball player (born 1990)

Personal information
- Nationality: Japanese
- Born: 1 May 1990 (age 36)
- Height: 1.74 m (5 ft 8 1/2 in)

Sport
- Sport: Handball
- Position: Goalkeeper
- Current club: Osaki Osol
National team
Years	Team	Apps	(Gls)
–	Japan	22	(0)

Masatake Kimura (木村 昌丈, Kimura Masatake; born 1 May 1990) is a Japanese handball player for Osaki Osol and the Japanese national team.

He participated at the 2017 World Men's Handball Championship.
