= 2023 African Women's Junior Handball Championship =

Tournament details
- Host country: Tunis
- Venue(s): 1 (in 1 host city)
- Dates: 7–14 September
- Teams: 10 (from 1 confederation)

Final positions
- Champions: Angola (11th title)
- Runners-up: Egypt
- Third place: Guinea
- Fourth place: Tunisia

Tournament statistics
- Matches played: 29
- Goals scored: 1,681 (57.97 per match)

The 2023 African Women's Junior Handball Championship was held in Monastir, Tunisia from 7 to 14 September 2023. It also acted as qualification tournament for the 2024 Women's Junior World Handball Championship to be held in North Macedonia.

== Draw ==
The draw was held on 8 August 2023 at the CAHB headquarters in Abidjan, Ivory Coast.

== Preliminary round ==
All times are local (UTC+1).

=== Group A ===
Pos	Team	Pld	W	D	L	GF	GA	GD	Pts	Qualification
1	Angola	4	4	0	0	170	59	+111	8	Semifinals
2	Guinea	4	3	0	1	164	90	+74	6	Semifinals
3	Ivory Coast	4	2	0	2	113	137	−24	4	5–8th place semifinals
4	Kenya	4	0	1	3	81	161	−80	1 (Note: DR Congo 23–23 Kenya)	5–8th place semifinals
5	DR Congo	4	0	1	3	62	143	−81	1	9th place game

Rules for classification: 1) Points; 2) Head-to-head points; 3) Head-to-head goal difference; 4) Head-to-head goals scored; 5) Goal difference; 6) Goals scored; 7) Draw.
Notes:

7 September 2023; 11:00	Kenya	9–54	Angola	Mohamed-Mzali Sports Hall, Monastir
7 September 2023; 11:00		(5–26)		Mohamed-Mzali Sports Hall, Monastir

7 September 2023; 15:00	Guinea	45–9	DR Congo	Mohamed-Mzali Sports Hall, Monastir
7 September 2023; 15:00		(23–4)		Mohamed-Mzali Sports Hall, Monastir

8 September 2023; 11:00	DR Congo	23–23	Kenya	Mohamed-Mzali Sports Hall, Monastir
8 September 2023; 11:00		(11–5)		Mohamed-Mzali Sports Hall, Monastir

8 September 2023; 14:00	Guinea	49–25	Ivory Coast	Mohamed-Mzali Sports Hall, Monastir
8 September 2023; 14:00		(24–11)		Mohamed-Mzali Sports Hall, Monastir

9 September 2023; 11:00	Ivory Coast	36–24	Kenya	Mohamed-Mzali Sports Hall, Monastir
9 September 2023; 11:00		(19–15)		Mohamed-Mzali Sports Hall, Monastir

9 September 2023; 18:30	Angola	42–9	DR Congo	Mohamed-Mzali Sports Hall, Monastir
9 September 2023; 18:30		(21–6)		Mohamed-Mzali Sports Hall, Monastir

10 September 2023; 11:00	Guinea	48–25	Kenya	Mohamed-Mzali Sports Hall, Monastir
10 September 2023; 11:00		(28–12)		Mohamed-Mzali Sports Hall, Monastir

10 September 2023; 14:00	Angola	43–19	Ivory Coast	Mohamed-Mzali Sports Hall, Monastir
10 September 2023; 14:00		(23–9)		Mohamed-Mzali Sports Hall, Monastir

12 September 2023; 14:00	Ivory Coast	33–21	DR Congo	Mohamed-Mzali Sports Hall, Monastir
12 September 2023; 14:00		(18–10)		Mohamed-Mzali Sports Hall, Monastir

12 September 2023; 16:00	Guinea	22–31	Angola	Mohamed-Mzali Sports Hall, Monastir
12 September 2023; 16:00		(10–12)		Mohamed-Mzali Sports Hall, Monastir

=== Group B ===
Pos	Team	Pld	W	D	L	GF	GA	GD	Pts	Qualification
1	Egypt	4	4	0	0	180	71	+109	8	Semifinals
2	Tunisia (H)	4	3	0	1	153	79	+74	6	Semifinals
3	Algeria	4	2	0	2	95	99	−4	4	5–8th place semifinals
4	Mali	4	1	0	3	88	175	−87	2	5–8th place semifinals
5	Madagascar	4	0	0	4	59	151	−92	0	9th place game

Rules for classification: 1) Points; 2) Head-to-head points; 3) Head-to-head goal difference; 4) Head-to-head goals scored; 5) Goal difference; 6) Goals scored; 7) Draw.
(H) Hosts

7 September 2023; 13:00	Mali	15–64	Egypt	Mohamed-Mzali Sports Hall, Monastir
7 September 2023; 13:00		(7–34)		Mohamed-Mzali Sports Hall, Monastir

7 September 2023; 18:30	Tunisia	44–11	Madagascar	Mohamed-Mzali Sports Hall, Monastir
7 September 2023; 18:30		(24–3)		Mohamed-Mzali Sports Hall, Monastir

8 September 2023; 16:00	Madagascar	25–32	Mali	Mohamed-Mzali Sports Hall, Monastir
8 September 2023; 16:00		(11–17)		Mohamed-Mzali Sports Hall, Monastir

8 September 2023; 18:30	Tunisia	32–19	Algeria	Mohamed-Mzali Sports Hall, Monastir
8 September 2023; 18:30		(16–9)		Mohamed-Mzali Sports Hall, Monastir

9 September 2023; 14:00	Egypt	54–10	Madagascar	Mohamed-Mzali Sports Hall, Monastir
9 September 2023; 14:00		(26–4)		Mohamed-Mzali Sports Hall, Monastir

9 September 2023; 16:00	Algeria	36–22	Mali	Mohamed-Mzali Sports Hall, Monastir
9 September 2023; 16:00		(16–8)		Mohamed-Mzali Sports Hall, Monastir

10 September 2023; 16:00	Egypt	32–19	Algeria	Mohamed-Mzali Sports Hall, Monastir
10 September 2023; 16:00		(19–5)		Mohamed-Mzali Sports Hall, Monastir

10 September 2023; 18:30	Mali	19–50	Tunisia	Mohamed-Mzali Sports Hall, Monastir
10 September 2023; 18:30		(9–19)		Mohamed-Mzali Sports Hall, Monastir

12 September 2023; 11:00	Algeria	21–13	Madagascar	Mohamed-Mzali Sports Hall, Monastir
12 September 2023; 11:00		(7–6)		Mohamed-Mzali Sports Hall, Monastir

12 September 2023; 18:30	Tunisia	27–30	Egypt	Mohamed-Mzali Sports Hall, Monastir
12 September 2023; 18:30		(11–17)		Mohamed-Mzali Sports Hall, Monastir

== Knockout stage ==
=== Bracket ===
Semifinals
13 September
Angola	28
Tunisia	22
13 September
Egypt	26
Guinea	18

Final
14 September
Angola	30
Egypt	26
Third place
14 September
Tunisia	31
Guinea	36

5–8th place semifinals
13 September
Ivory Coast	38
Mali	26
13 September
Algeria	35
Kenya	26

Fifth place
14 September
Ivory Coast	19
Algeria	26
Seventh place
14 September
Mali	33
Kenya	39

=== 5–8th place semifinals ===
13 September 2023; 12:00	Ivory Coast	38–26	Mali	Mohamed-Mzali Sports Hall, Monastir
13 September 2023; 12:00		(21–8)		Mohamed-Mzali Sports Hall, Monastir

13 September 2023; 14:00	Algeria	35–26	Kenya	Mohamed-Mzali Sports Hall, Monastir
13 September 2023; 14:00		(17–11)		Mohamed-Mzali Sports Hall, Monastir

=== Semifinals ===
13 September 2023; 16:00	Angola	28–22	Tunisia	Mohamed-Mzali Sports Hall, Monastir
13 September 2023; 16:00		(13–10)		Mohamed-Mzali Sports Hall, Monastir

13 September 2023; 18:30	Egypt	26–18	Guinea	Mohamed-Mzali Sports Hall, Monastir
13 September 2023; 18:30		(14–8)		Mohamed-Mzali Sports Hall, Monastir

=== Ninth place game ===
13 September 2023; 10:00	DR Congo	33–24	Madagascar	Mohamed-Mzali Sports Hall, Monastir
13 September 2023; 10:00		(15–8)		Mohamed-Mzali Sports Hall, Monastir

=== Seventh place game ===
14 September 2023; 11:00	Mali	33–39	Kenya	Mohamed-Mzali Sports Hall, Monastir
14 September 2023; 11:00		(13–18)		Mohamed-Mzali Sports Hall, Monastir

=== Fifth place game ===
14 September 2023; 14:00	Ivory Coast	19–26	Algeria	Mohamed-Mzali Sports Hall, Monastir
14 September 2023; 14:00		(7–12)		Mohamed-Mzali Sports Hall, Monastir

=== Third place game ===
14 September 2023; 16:00	Tunisia	31–36	Guinea	Mohamed-Mzali Sports Hall, Monastir
14 September 2023; 16:00		(14–21)		Mohamed-Mzali Sports Hall, Monastir

=== Final ===
14 September 2023; 18:30	Angola	30–26	Egypt	Mohamed-Mzali Sports Hall, Monastir
14 September 2023; 18:30		(10–8)		Mohamed-Mzali Sports Hall, Monastir

== Final standings ==
Rank	Team
1st place, gold medalist(s)	Angola
2nd place, silver medalist(s)	Egypt
3rd place, bronze medalist(s)	Guinea
4	Tunisia
5	Algeria
6	Ivory Coast
7	Kenya
8	Mali
9	DR Congo
10	Madagascar

Team qualified for the 2024 Junior World Championship
