= 2019 African Women's Youth Handball Championship =

Tournament details
- Host country: Niger
- Venue(s): 1 (in 1 host city)
- Dates: 16–24 September
- Teams: 7 (from 1 confederation)

Final positions
- Champions: Egypt (3rd title)
- Runner-up: Angola
- Third place: Tunisia
- Fourth place: Guinea

Tournament statistics
- Matches played: 21
- Goals scored: 1,065 (50.71 per match)

The 2019 African Women's Youth Handball Championship was the 14th edition of the championship held in Niamey, Niger from 16 to 24 September 2019. It also acted as qualification tournament for the 2020 Women's Youth World Handball Championship to be held in China.

== Participating teams ==
Country	Previous appearances in tournament
Algeria	1 (2017)
Angola	5 (**2009**, **2011**, **2013**, 2015, 2017)
DR Congo	5 (2009, 2011, 2013, 2015, 2017)
Egypt	2 (**2015**, **2017**)
Guinea	1 (2013)
Niger	0 (debut)
Tunisia	3 (2011, 2013, 2017)

Note: Bold indicates champion for that year. Italic indicates host for that year.

== Results ==
All times are local (UTC+1).

Pos	Team	Pld	W	D	L	GF	GA	GD	Pts	Qualification
1st place, gold medalist(s)	Egypt	6	6	0	0	207	109	+98	12	2020 Women's Youth World Championship
2nd place, silver medalist(s)	Angola	6	5	0	1	195	111	+84	10	2020 Women's Youth World Championship
3rd place, bronze medalist(s)	Tunisia	6	3	1	2	158	147	+11	7	2020 Women's Youth World Championship
4	Guinea	6	3	1	2	156	155	+1	7	
5	Algeria	6	2	0	4	130	167	−37	4	
6	DR Congo	6	1	0	5	126	171	−45	2	
7	Niger (H)	6	0	0	6	93	205	−112	0	

Rules for classification: 1) Points; 2) Head-to-head points; 3) Head-to-head goal difference; 4) Head-to-head goals scored; 5) Goal difference; 6) Goals scored; 7) Draw.
(H) Hosts

16 September 2019; 12:00	**DR Congo**	**19–28**	**Algeria**	Palace of 29 July, Niamey
16 September 2019; 12:00		(8–14)		Palace of 29 July, Niamey

16 September 2019; 18:00	**Niger**	**19–25**	**Guinea**	Palace of 29 July, Niamey
16 September 2019; 18:00		(8–10)		Palace of 29 July, Niamey

17 September 2019; 14:00	**Angola**	**36–10**	**Algeria**	Palace of 29 July, Niamey
17 September 2019; 14:00		(15–5)		Palace of 29 July, Niamey

17 September 2019; 16:00	**DR Congo**	**19–22**	**Guinea**	Palace of 29 July, Niamey
17 September 2019; 16:00		(10–10)		Palace of 29 July, Niamey

17 September 2019; 18:00	**Egypt**	**43–8**	**Niger**	Palace of 29 July, Niamey
17 September 2019; 18:00		(17–4)		Palace of 29 July, Niamey

18 September 2019; 14:00	**Tunisia**	**24–22**	**Algeria**	Palace of 29 July, Niamey
18 September 2019; 14:00		(13–10)		Palace of 29 July, Niamey

18 September 2019; 16:00	**Egypt**	**33–26**	**Guinea**	Palace of 29 July, Niamey
18 September 2019; 16:00		(15–13)		Palace of 29 July, Niamey

18 September 2019; 18:00	**DR Congo**	**28–18**	**Niger**	Palace of 29 July, Niamey
18 September 2019; 18:00		(14–8)		Palace of 29 July, Niamey

19 September 2019; 16:00	**Tunisia**	**21–28**	**Angola**	Palace of 29 July, Niamey
19 September 2019; 16:00		(9–19)		Palace of 29 July, Niamey

20 September 2019; 14:00	**Angola**	**28–20**	**Guinea**	Palace of 29 July, Niamey
20 September 2019; 14:00		(13–14)		Palace of 29 July, Niamey

20 September 2019; 16:00	**Egypt**	**36–15**	**Algeria**	Palace of 29 July, Niamey
20 September 2019; 16:00		(16–7)		Palace of 29 July, Niamey

20 September 2019; 18:00	**Niger**	**16–30**	**Tunisia**	Palace of 29 July, Niamey
20 September 2019; 18:00		(4–14)		Palace of 29 July, Niamey

21 September 2019; 14:00	**Egypt**	**40–17**	**DR Congo**	Palace of 29 July, Niamey
21 September 2019; 14:00		(19–9)		Palace of 29 July, Niamey

21 September 2019; 16:00	**Tunisia**	**31–31**	**Guinea**	Palace of 29 July, Niamey
21 September 2019; 16:00		(15–17)		Palace of 29 July, Niamey

21 September 2019; 18:00	**Angola**	**49–12**	**Niger**	Palace of 29 July, Niamey
21 September 2019; 18:00		(21–7)		Palace of 29 July, Niamey

22 September 2019; 14:00	**Tunisia**	**31–23**	**DR Congo**	Palace of 29 July, Niamey
22 September 2019; 14:00		(14–10)		Palace of 29 July, Niamey

22 September 2019; 16:00	**Egypt**	**28–22**	**Angola**	Palace of 29 July, Niamey
22 September 2019; 16:00		(13–10)		Palace of 29 July, Niamey

22 September 2019; 18:00	**Algeria**	**30–20**	**Niger**	Palace of 29 July, Niamey
22 September 2019; 18:00		(13–11)		Palace of 29 July, Niamey

24 September 2019; 14:00	**Algeria**	**25–32**	**Guinea**	Palace of 29 July, Niamey
24 September 2019; 14:00		(10–18)		Palace of 29 July, Niamey

24 September 2019; 16:00	**Angola**	**32–20**	**DR Congo**	Palace of 29 July, Niamey
24 September 2019; 16:00		(15–12)		Palace of 29 July, Niamey

24 September 2019; 18:00	**Egypt**	**27–21**	**Tunisia**	Palace of 29 July, Niamey
24 September 2019; 18:00		(12–10)		Palace of 29 July, Niamey
