= 2025 African Women's Junior Handball Championship =

Tournament details
- Host country: Algeria
- City: Oran
- Venues: 2 (in 1 host city)
- Dates: 6–13 September
- Teams: 11 (from 1 confederation)

Final positions
- Champions: Egypt (1st title)
- Runners-up: Guinea
- Third place: Angola
- Fourth place: Tunisia

Tournament statistics
- Matches played: 32
- Goals scored: 1,698 (53.06 per match)

The 2025 African Women's Junior Handball Championship (Arabic: البطولة الإفريقية لكرة اليد لأقل من 19 سنة إناث 2025) was held in Oran, Algeria from 6 to 13 September 2025. It also acted as qualification tournament for the 2026 Women's Junior World Handball Championship.

== Teams ==
- Algeria (hosts)
- Angola
- Burkina Faso
- DR Congo
- Egypt
- Guinea
- Ivory Coast
- Kenya
- Mali
- Tunisia
- Zambia

- Réunion (withraw)

== Draw ==
The draw was held on 31 July 2025 at the CAHB headquarters in Abidjan, Ivory Coast.

== Venues ==
2025 African Women's Junior Handball Championship is located in Algeria	Oran	
2025 African Women's Junior Handball Championship is located in Algeria	Bir El Djir	Medina Jedida (Oran Center)
2025 African Women's Junior Handball Championship is located in Algeria	Miloud Hadefi Complex Arena	Hamou Boutlélis Sports Palace
2025 African Women's Junior Handball Championship is located in Algeria	Main Hall	Second Hall
2025 African Women's Junior Handball Championship is located in Algeria	Capacity: 7,000	Capacity: 5,000

== Preliminary round ==
All times are local (UTC+1).

=== Group A ===
Pos	Team	Pld	W	D	L	GF	GA	GD	Pts	Qualification
1	Egypt	5	5	0	0	188	94	+94	10	Semifinals
2	Tunisia	5	4	0	1	165	108	+57	8	Semifinals
3	Ivory Coast	5	2	0	3	109	122	−13	4 (Note: Ivory Coast 25–23 Burkina Faso)	Fifth place game
4	Burkina Faso	5	2	0	3	118	140	−22	4	Seventh place game
5	DR Congo	5	1	1	3	102	143	−41	3	Ninth place game
6	Zambia	5	0	1	4	86	161	−75	1	

Rules for classification: 1) Points; 2) Head-to-head points; 3) Head-to-head goal difference; 4) Head-to-head goals scored; 5) Goal difference; 6) Goals scored; 7) Draw.
Notes:

6 September 2025; 13:00	Ivory Coast	27–10	Zambia	Miloud Hadefi Complex Arena, Bir El Djir
6 September 2025; 13:00		(8–5)		Miloud Hadefi Complex Arena, Bir El Djir

6 September 2025; 13:00	Tunisia	33–15	Burkina Faso	Hamou Boutlélis Sports Palace, Oran
6 September 2025; 13:00		(16–6)		Hamou Boutlélis Sports Palace, Oran

6 September 2025; 15:00	Egypt	43–22	DR Congo	Miloud Hadefi Complex Arena, Bir El Djir
6 September 2025; 15:00		(18–10)		Miloud Hadefi Complex Arena, Bir El Djir

7 September 2025; 14:00	Zambia	17–40	Egypt	Miloud Hadefi Complex Arena, Bir El Djir
7 September 2025; 14:00		(9–19)		Miloud Hadefi Complex Arena, Bir El Djir

7 September 2025; 16:00	Tunisia	35–23	Ivory Coast	Miloud Hadefi Complex Arena, Bir El Djir
7 September 2025; 16:00		(16–9)		Miloud Hadefi Complex Arena, Bir El Djir

7 September 2025; 16:00	Burkina Faso	30–20	DR Congo	Hamou Boutlélis Sports Palace, Oran
7 September 2025; 16:00		(13–11)		Hamou Boutlélis Sports Palace, Oran

8 September 2025; 14:00	Egypt	44–17	Burkina Faso	Miloud Hadefi Complex Arena, Bir El Djir
8 September 2025; 14:00		(22–9)		Miloud Hadefi Complex Arena, Bir El Djir

8 September 2025; 18:00	Ivory Coast	18–19	DR Congo	Miloud Hadefi Complex Arena, Bir El Djir
8 September 2025; 18:00		(11–7)		Miloud Hadefi Complex Arena, Bir El Djir

8 September 2025; 18:00	Zambia	22–42	Tunisia	Hamou Boutlélis Sports Palace, Oran
8 September 2025; 18:00		(13–19)		Hamou Boutlélis Sports Palace, Oran

10 September 2025; 16:00	Tunisia	22–26	Egypt	Miloud Hadefi Complex Arena, Bir El Djir
10 September 2025; 16:00		(12–16)		Miloud Hadefi Complex Arena, Bir El Djir

10 September 2025; 16:00	DR Congo	19–19	Zambia	Hamou Boutlélis Sports Palace, Oran
10 September 2025; 16:00		(9–10)		Hamou Boutlélis Sports Palace, Oran

10 September 2025; 18:00	Ivory Coast	25–23	Burkina Faso	Hamou Boutlélis Sports Palace, Oran
10 September 2025; 18:00		(15–12)		Hamou Boutlélis Sports Palace, Oran

11 September 2025; 14:00	DR Congo	22–33	Tunisia	Miloud Hadefi Complex Arena, Bir El Djir
11 September 2025; 14:00		(11–18)		Miloud Hadefi Complex Arena, Bir El Djir

11 September 2025; 14:00	Burkina Faso	33–18	Zambia	Hamou Boutlélis Sports Palace, Oran
11 September 2025; 14:00		(20–10)		Hamou Boutlélis Sports Palace, Oran

11 September 2025; 16:00	Egypt	35–16	Ivory Coast	Hamou Boutlélis Sports Palace, Oran
11 September 2025; 16:00		(16–6)		Hamou Boutlélis Sports Palace, Oran

=== Group B ===
Pos	Team	Pld	W	D	L	GF	GA	GD	Pts	Qualification
1	Guinea	4	4	0	0	130	90	+40	8	Semifinals
2	Angola	4	3	0	1	127	80	+47	6	Semifinals
3	Algeria (H)	4	2	0	2	111	90	+21	4	Fifth place game
4	Kenya	4	1	0	3	127	143	−16	2	Seventh place game
5	Mali	4	0	0	4	72	164	−92	0	Ninth place game
—	Réunion	0	0	0	0	0	0	0	0	Withrawn

Rules for classification: 1) Points; 2) Head-to-head points; 3) Head-to-head goal difference; 4) Head-to-head goals scored; 5) Goal difference; 6) Goals scored; 7) Draw.
(H) Hosts

6 September 2025; 15:00	Guinea	26–21	Angola	Hamou Boutlélis Sports Palace, Oran
6 September 2025; 15:00		(12–11)		Hamou Boutlélis Sports Palace, Oran

6 September 2025; 18:00	Algeria	37–26	Kenya	Miloud Hadefi Complex Arena, Bir El Djir
6 September 2025; 18:00		(17–11)		Miloud Hadefi Complex Arena, Bir El Djir

7 September 2025; 18:00	Algeria	39–16	Mali	Miloud Hadefi Complex Arena, Bir El Djir
7 September 2025; 18:00		(21–10)		Miloud Hadefi Complex Arena, Bir El Djir

7 September 2025; 18:00	Angola	41–26	Kenya	Hamou Boutlélis Sports Palace, Oran
7 September 2025; 18:00		(20–8)		Hamou Boutlélis Sports Palace, Oran

8 September 2025; 16:00	Mali	12–42	Angola	Miloud Hadefi Complex Arena, Bir El Djir
8 September 2025; 16:00		(5–19)		Miloud Hadefi Complex Arena, Bir El Djir

8 September 2025; 16:00	Kenya	30–41	Guinea	Hamou Boutlélis Sports Palace, Oran
8 September 2025; 16:00		(12–20)		Hamou Boutlélis Sports Palace, Oran

10 September 2025; 14:00	Mali	24–45	Kenya	Hamou Boutlélis Sports Palace, Oran
10 September 2025; 14:00		(13–22)		Hamou Boutlélis Sports Palace, Oran

10 September 2025; 18:00	Algeria	19–25	Guinea	Miloud Hadefi Complex Arena, Bir El Djir
10 September 2025; 18:00		(8–12)		Miloud Hadefi Complex Arena, Bir El Djir

11 September 2025; 16:00	Guinea	38–20	Mali	Miloud Hadefi Complex Arena, Bir El Djir
11 September 2025; 16:00		(20–8)		Miloud Hadefi Complex Arena, Bir El Djir

11 September 2025; 18:00	Angola	23–16	Algeria	Miloud Hadefi Complex Arena, Bir El Djir
11 September 2025; 18:00		(13–7)		Miloud Hadefi Complex Arena, Bir El Djir

== Classification stage ==
=== Ninth place game ===
12 September 2025; 14:00	DR Congo	35–21	Mali	Hamou Boutlélis Sports Palace, Oran
12 September 2025; 14:00		(16–12)		Hamou Boutlélis Sports Palace, Oran

=== Seventh place game ===
12 September 2025; 13:30	Burkina Faso	35–27	Kenya	Miloud Hadefi Complex Arena, Bir El Djir
12 September 2025; 13:30		(16–14)		Miloud Hadefi Complex Arena, Bir El Djir

=== Fifth place game ===
12 September 2025; 16:00	Ivory Coast	21–28	Algeria	Hamou Boutlélis Sports Palace, Oran
12 September 2025; 16:00		(7–12)		Hamou Boutlélis Sports Palace, Oran

== Knockout stage ==
Semifinals
12 September
Egypt (ET)	26
Angola	25
12 September
Guinea	28
Tunisia	22

Final
13 September
Egypt	25
Guinea	22
Third place
13 September
Angola	26
Tunisia	22

=== Semifinals ===
12 September 2025
15:30
Egypt
26–25 (ET)
Angola
Miloud Hadefi Complex Arena, Bir El Djir

(11–11)

FT: 21–21 ET: 5–4

12 September 2025; 18:00	Guinea	28–22	Tunisia	Miloud Hadefi Complex Arena, Bir El Djir
12 September 2025; 18:00		(10–13)		Miloud Hadefi Complex Arena, Bir El Djir

=== Third place game ===
13 September 2025; 15:30	Angola	26–22	Tunisia	Miloud Hadefi Complex Arena, Bir El Djir
13 September 2025; 15:30		(14–13)		Miloud Hadefi Complex Arena, Bir El Djir

=== Final ===
13 September 2025; 18:00	Egypt	25–22	Guinea	Miloud Hadefi Complex Arena, Bir El Djir
13 September 2025; 18:00		(11–12)		Miloud Hadefi Complex Arena, Bir El Djir

== Final standings ==
Rank	Team
1st place, gold medalist(s)	Egypt
2nd place, silver medalist(s)	Guinea
3rd place, bronze medalist(s)	Angola
4	Tunisia
5	Algeria
6	Ivory Coast
7	Burkina Faso
8	Kenya
9	DR Congo
10	Mali
11	Zambia

Team qualified for the 2026 U20 World Championship

== See also ==
- 2025 African Women's Youth Handball Championship
