= 2025 African Women's Youth Handball Championship =

Tournament details
- Host country: Algeria
- City: Oran
- Venues: 2 (in 1 host city)
- Dates: 14–21 September
- Teams: 11 (from 1 confederation)

Final positions
- Champions: Egypt (6th title)
- Runners-up: Tunisia
- Third place: Guinea
- Fourth place: Angola

Tournament statistics
- Matches played: 32
- Goals scored: 1,452 (45.38 per match)

The 2025 African Women's Youth Handball Championship (Arabic: البطولة الإفريقية لكرة اليد لأقل من 17 سنة إناث 2025) is held in Oran, Algeria from 14 to 21 September 2025. It also acted as qualification tournament for the 2026 IHF Women's U18 Handball World Championship.

== Teams ==
- Algeria (hosts)
- Angola
- Benin
- Burkina Faso
- Egypt
- Guinea
- Kenya
- Madagascar
- Nigeria
- Tunisia
- Zambia

== Draw ==
The draw was held on 31 July 2025 at the CAHB headquarters in Abidjan, Ivory Coast.

== Venues ==
2025 African Women's Youth Handball Championship is located in Algeria	Oran	
2025 African Women's Youth Handball Championship is located in Algeria	Bir El Djir	Medina Jedida (Oran Center)
2025 African Women's Youth Handball Championship is located in Algeria	Miloud Hadefi Complex Arena	Hamou Boutlélis Sports Palace
2025 African Women's Youth Handball Championship is located in Algeria	Main Hall	Second Hall
2025 African Women's Youth Handball Championship is located in Algeria	Capacity: 7,000	Capacity: 5,000

== Preliminary round ==
All times are local (UTC+1).

=== Group A ===
Pos	Team	Pld	W	D	L	GF	GA	GD	Pts	Qualification
1	Tunisia	5	5	0	0	167	91	+76	10	Semifinals
2	Angola	5	4	0	1	97	80	+17	8	Semifinals
3	Nigeria	5	2	1	2	123	139	−16	5	Fifth place game
4	Kenya	5	2	0	3	145	142	+3	4	Seventh place game
5	Benin	5	1	1	3	98	135	−37	3	Ninth place game
6	Madagascar	5	0	0	5	58	101	−43	0	

Rules for classification: 1) Points; 2) Head-to-head points; 3) Head-to-head goal difference; 4) Head-to-head goals scored; 5) Goal difference; 6) Goals scored; 7) Draw.

14 September 2025; 14:00	Madagascar	0–10	Nigeria	Hamou Boutlélis Sports Palace, Oran

14 September 2025; 16:00	Kenya	28–36	Tunisia	Miloud Hadefi Complex Arena, Bir El Djir
14 September 2025; 16:00		(10–20)		Miloud Hadefi Complex Arena, Bir El Djir

14 September 2025; 18:00	Angola	10–0	Benin	Hamou Boutlélis Sports Palace, Oran

15 September 2025; 16:00	Angola	23–18	Kenya	Miloud Hadefi Complex Arena, Bir El Djir
15 September 2025; 16:00		(11–10)		Miloud Hadefi Complex Arena, Bir El Djir

15 September 2025; 16:00	Tunisia	10–0	Madagascar	Hamou Boutlélis Sports Palace, Oran

16 September 2025; 14:00	Madagascar	12–22	Angola	Miloud Hadefi Complex Arena, Bir El Djir
16 September 2025; 14:00		(7–13)		Miloud Hadefi Complex Arena, Bir El Djir

16 September 2025; 18:00	Nigeria	25–50	Tunisia	Miloud Hadefi Complex Arena, Bir El Djir
16 September 2025; 18:00		(8–25)		Miloud Hadefi Complex Arena, Bir El Djir

16 September 2025; 18:00	Benin	23–30	Kenya	Hamou Boutlélis Sports Palace, Oran

17 September 2025; 16:00	Nigeria	31–31	Benin	Miloud Hadefi Complex Arena, Bir El Djir
17 September 2025; 16:00		(17–15)		Miloud Hadefi Complex Arena, Bir El Djir

18 September 2025; 14:00	Kenya	34–23	Madagascar	Hamou Boutlélis Sports Palace, Oran
18 September 2025; 14:00		(18–13)		Hamou Boutlélis Sports Palace, Oran

18 September 2025; 16:00	Tunisia	41–19	Benin	Hamou Boutlélis Sports Palace, Oran
18 September 2025; 16:00		(22–12)		Hamou Boutlélis Sports Palace, Oran

18 September 2025; 18:00	Nigeria	20–23	Angola	Hamou Boutlélis Sports Palace, Oran
18 September 2025; 18:00		(8–11)		Hamou Boutlélis Sports Palace, Oran

19 September 2025; 14:00	Benin	25–23	Madagascar	Miloud Hadefi Complex Arena, Bir El Djir
19 September 2025; 14:00		(12–15)		Miloud Hadefi Complex Arena, Bir El Djir

19 September 2025; 16:00	Angola	19–30	Tunisia	Miloud Hadefi Complex Arena, Bir El Djir
19 September 2025; 16:00		(10–17)		Miloud Hadefi Complex Arena, Bir El Djir

19 September 2025; 16:00	Kenya	35–37	Nigeria	Hamou Boutlélis Sports Palace, Oran
19 September 2025; 16:00		(14–18)		Hamou Boutlélis Sports Palace, Oran

=== Group B ===
Pos	Team	Pld	W	D	L	GF	GA	GD	Pts	Qualification
1	Egypt	4	4	0	0	102	52	+50	8	Semifinals
2	Guinea	4	2	1	1	98	65	+33	5 (Note: Algeria 16–16 Guinea)	Semifinals
3	Algeria (H)	4	2	1	1	96	89	+7	5	Fifth place game
4	Burkina Faso	4	1	0	3	101	98	+3	2	Seventh place game
5	Zambia	4	0	0	4	39	132	−93	0	Ninth place game

Rules for classification: 1) Points; 2) Head-to-head points; 3) Head-to-head goal difference; 4) Head-to-head goals scored; 5) Goal difference; 6) Goals scored; 7) Draw.
(H) Hosts
Notes:

14 September 2025; 16:00	Egypt	10–0	Zambia	Hamou Boutlélis Sports Palace, Oran

14 September 2025; 18:00	Algeria	26–21	Burkina Faso	Miloud Hadefi Complex Arena, Bir El Djir
14 September 2025; 18:00		(11–11)		Miloud Hadefi Complex Arena, Bir El Djir

15 September 2025; 18:00	Egypt	36–15	Algeria	Miloud Hadefi Complex Arena, Bir El Djir
15 September 2025; 18:00		(21–4)		Miloud Hadefi Complex Arena, Bir El Djir

15 September 2025; 18:00	Guinea	25–17	Burkina Faso	Hamou Boutlélis Sports Palace, Oran
15 September 2025; 18:00		(13–10)		Hamou Boutlélis Sports Palace, Oran

16 September 2025; 16:00	Burkina Faso	17–32	Egypt	Miloud Hadefi Complex Arena, Bir El Djir
16 September 2025; 16:00		(8–16)		Miloud Hadefi Complex Arena, Bir El Djir

16 September 2025; 16:00	Zambia	8–37	Guinea	Hamou Boutlélis Sports Palace, Oran
16 September 2025; 16:00		(4–18)		Hamou Boutlélis Sports Palace, Oran

18 September 2025; 16:00	Guinea	20–24	Egypt	Miloud Hadefi Complex Arena, Bir El Djir
18 September 2025; 16:00		(11–9)		Miloud Hadefi Complex Arena, Bir El Djir

18 September 2025; 18:00	Zambia	16–39	Algeria	Miloud Hadefi Complex Arena, Bir El Djir
18 September 2025; 18:00		(10–25)		Miloud Hadefi Complex Arena, Bir El Djir

19 September 2025; 14:00	Burkina Faso	46–15	Zambia	Hamou Boutlélis Sports Palace, Oran
19 September 2025; 14:00		(20–6)		Hamou Boutlélis Sports Palace, Oran

19 September 2025; 18:00	Algeria	16–16	Guinea	Miloud Hadefi Complex Arena, Bir El Djir
19 September 2025; 18:00		(9–10)		Miloud Hadefi Complex Arena, Bir El Djir

== Classification stage ==
=== Ninth place game ===
20 September 2025; 14:00	Benin	44–12	Zambia	Hamou Boutlélis Sports Palace, Oran
20 September 2025; 14:00		(17–6)		Hamou Boutlélis Sports Palace, Oran

=== Seventh place game ===
20 September 2025; 16:00	Kenya	29–20	Burkina Faso	Hamou Boutlélis Sports Palace, Oran
20 September 2025; 16:00		(13–12)		Hamou Boutlélis Sports Palace, Oran

=== Fifth place game ===
20 September 2025; 18:00	Nigeria	29–28	Algeria	Hamou Boutlélis Sports Palace, Oran
20 September 2025; 18:00		(13–11)		Hamou Boutlélis Sports Palace, Oran

== Knockout stage ==
Semifinals
20 September
Tunisia	25
Guinea	23
20 September
Egypt	19
Angola	16

Final
21 September
Tunisia	21
Egypt	33
Third place
21 September
Guinea	18
Angola	11

=== Semifinals ===
20 September 2025; 15:30	Tunisia	25–23	Guinea	Miloud Hadefi Complex Arena, Bir El Djir
20 September 2025; 15:30		(10–8)		Miloud Hadefi Complex Arena, Bir El Djir

20 September 2025; 18:00	Egypt	19–16	Angola	Miloud Hadefi Complex Arena, Bir El Djir
20 September 2025; 18:00		(13–7)		Miloud Hadefi Complex Arena, Bir El Djir

=== Third place game ===
21 September 2025; 15:30	Guinea	18–11	Angola	Miloud Hadefi Complex Arena, Bir El Djir
21 September 2025; 15:30		(8–1)		Miloud Hadefi Complex Arena, Bir El Djir

=== Final ===
21 September 2025; 18:00	Tunisia	21–33	Egypt	Miloud Hadefi Complex Arena, Bir El Djir
21 September 2025; 18:00		(9–16)		Miloud Hadefi Complex Arena, Bir El Djir

== Final standings ==
Rank	Team
1st place, gold medalist(s)	Egypt
2nd place, silver medalist(s)	Tunisia
3rd place, bronze medalist(s)	Guinea
4	Angola
5	Nigeria
6	Algeria
7	Kenya
8	Burkina Faso
9	Benin
10	Zambia
11	Madagascar

Team qualified for the 2026 U18 World Championship

== See also ==
- 2025 African Women's Junior Handball Championship
- 2025 Asian Men's U-17 Handball Championship
