= 2023 African Women's Youth Handball Championship =

Tournament details
- Host country: Tunis
- Venue(s): 1 (in 1 host city)
- Dates: 16–23 September
- Teams: 8 (from 1 confederation)

Final positions
- Champions: Egypt (5th title)
- Runners-up: Guinea
- Third place: Nigeria
- Fourth place: Angola

Tournament statistics
- Matches played: 23

The 2023 African Women's Youth Handball Championship was held in Monastir, Tunisia from 16 to 23 September 2023. It acted as a qualification tournament for the 2024 Women's Youth World Handball Championship to be held in China.

== Draw ==
The draw was held on 8 August 2023 at the CAHB headquarters in Abidjan, Ivory Coast.

== Preliminary round ==
All times are local (UTC+1).

=== Group A ===
Pos	Team	Pld	W	D	L	GF	GA	GD	Pts
1	Guinea	3	2	1	0	70	55	+15	5
2	Nigeria	3	2	0	1	76	61	+15	4
3	Tunisia (H)	3	1	1	1	67	62	+5	3
4	Algeria	3	0	0	3	51	86	−35	0

Rules for classification: 1) Points; 2) Head-to-head points; 3) Head-to-head goal difference; 4) Head-to-head goals scored; 5) Goal difference; 6) Goals scored; 7) Draw.
(H) Hosts

16 September 2023; 13:00	Algeria	18–28	Nigeria	Mohamed-Mzali Sports Hall, Monastir
16 September 2023; 13:00		(10–10)		Mohamed-Mzali Sports Hall, Monastir

16 September 2023; 18:30	Tunisia	18–18	Guinea	Mohamed-Mzali Sports Hall, Monastir
16 September 2023; 18:30		(7–9)		Mohamed-Mzali Sports Hall, Monastir

17 September 2023; 16:00	Guinea	23–20	Nigeria	Mohamed-Mzali Sports Hall, Monastir
17 September 2023; 16:00		(13–8)		Mohamed-Mzali Sports Hall, Monastir

17 September 2023; 18:30	Algeria	16–29	Tunisia	Mohamed-Mzali Sports Hall, Monastir
17 September 2023; 18:30		(9–12)		Mohamed-Mzali Sports Hall, Monastir

19 September 2023; 14:00	Guinea	29–17	Algeria	Mohamed-Mzali Sports Hall, Monastir
19 September 2023; 14:00		(15–8)		Mohamed-Mzali Sports Hall, Monastir

19 September 2023; 18:30	Nigeria	28–20	Tunisia	Mohamed-Mzali Sports Hall, Monastir
19 September 2023; 18:30		(13–9)		Mohamed-Mzali Sports Hall, Monastir

=== Group B ===
Pos	Team	Pld	W	D	L	GF	GA	GD	Pts
1	Egypt	3	3	0	0	75	35	+40	6
2	Angola	3	2	0	1	97	53	+44	4
3	Morocco	3	1	0	2	56	92	−36	2
4	DR Congo	3	0	0	3	28	76	−48	0

Rules for classification: 1) Points; 2) Head-to-head points; 3) Head-to-head goal difference; 4) Head-to-head goals scored; 5) Goal difference; 6) Goals scored; 7) Draw.

16 September 2023; 11:00	DR Congo	0–10; Walkover	Egypt	Mohamed-Mzali Sports Hall, Monastir

16 September 2023; 15:00	Angola	37–15	Morocco	Mohamed-Mzali Sports Hall, Monastir
16 September 2023; 15:00		(19–9)		Mohamed-Mzali Sports Hall, Monastir

17 September 2023; 11:00	Angola	37–13	DR Congo	Mohamed-Mzali Sports Hall, Monastir
17 September 2023; 11:00		(19–7)		Mohamed-Mzali Sports Hall, Monastir

17 September 2023; 14:00	Egypt	40–12	Morocco	Mohamed-Mzali Sports Hall, Monastir
17 September 2023; 14:00		(22–4)		Mohamed-Mzali Sports Hall, Monastir

19 September 2023; 11:00	Morocco	29–15	DR Congo	Mohamed-Mzali Sports Hall, Monastir
19 September 2023; 11:00		(16–8)		Mohamed-Mzali Sports Hall, Monastir

19 September 2023; 16:00	Egypt	25–23	Angola	Mohamed-Mzali Sports Hall, Monastir
19 September 2023; 16:00		(12–12)		Mohamed-Mzali Sports Hall, Monastir

== Knockout stage ==
=== Bracket ===
Quarterfinals
20 September
Egypt	30
Algeria	18
20 September
Nigeria	28
Morocco	14
20 September
Angola	21
Tunisia	17
20 September
Guinea	34
DR Congo	14

Semifinals
22 September
Egypt	32
Nigeria	18
22 September
Angola	21
Guinea	25

Final
23 September
Egypt	29
Guinea	16
Third place
23 September
Nigeria	28
Angola	24

5–8th place semifinals
22 September
Algeria	23
Morocco	29
22 September
Tunisia	33
DR Congo	20

Fifth place
23 September
Morocco	17
Tunisia	34
Seventh place
23 September
Algeria	29
DR Congo	20

=== Quarterfinals ===
20 September 2023; 11:00	Egypt	30–18	Algeria	Mohamed-Mzali Sports Hall, Monastir
20 September 2023; 11:00		(13–10)		Mohamed-Mzali Sports Hall, Monastir

20 September 2023; 13:30	Nigeria	28–14	Morocco	Mohamed-Mzali Sports Hall, Monastir
20 September 2023; 13:30		(17–5)		Mohamed-Mzali Sports Hall, Monastir

20 September 2023; 16:00	Guinea	34–14	DR Congo	Mohamed-Mzali Sports Hall, Monastir
20 September 2023; 16:00		(18–5)		Mohamed-Mzali Sports Hall, Monastir

20 September 2023; 18:30	Angola	21–17	Tunisia	Mohamed-Mzali Sports Hall, Monastir
20 September 2023; 18:30		(9–7)		Mohamed-Mzali Sports Hall, Monastir

=== 5–8th place semifinals ===
22 September 2023; 11:00	Algeria	23–29	Morocco	Mohamed-Mzali Sports Hall, Monastir
22 September 2023; 11:00		(11–13)		Mohamed-Mzali Sports Hall, Monastir

22 September 2023; 13:30	Tunisia	33–20	DR Congo	Mohamed-Mzali Sports Hall, Monastir
22 September 2023; 13:30		(20–10)		Mohamed-Mzali Sports Hall, Monastir

=== Semifinals ===
22 September 2023; 16:00	Egypt	32–18	Nigeria	Mohamed-Mzali Sports Hall, Monastir
22 September 2023; 16:00		(18–7)		Mohamed-Mzali Sports Hall, Monastir

22 September 2023; 18:00	Angola	21–25	Guinea	Mohamed-Mzali Sports Hall, Monastir
22 September 2023; 18:00		(8–16)		Mohamed-Mzali Sports Hall, Monastir

=== Seventh place game ===
23 September 2023; 12:00	Algeria	29–20	DR Congo	Mohamed-Mzali Sports Hall, Monastir
23 September 2023; 12:00		(16–10)		Mohamed-Mzali Sports Hall, Monastir

=== Fifth place game ===
23 September 2023; 14:00	Morocco	17–34	Tunisia	Mohamed-Mzali Sports Hall, Monastir
23 September 2023; 14:00		(8–20)		Mohamed-Mzali Sports Hall, Monastir

=== Third place game ===
23 September 2023; 16:00	Nigeria	28–24	Angola	Mohamed-Mzali Sports Hall, Monastir
23 September 2023; 16:00		(12–7)		Mohamed-Mzali Sports Hall, Monastir

=== Final ===
23 September 2023; 18:30	Egypt	29–16	Guinea	Mohamed-Mzali Sports Hall, Monastir
23 September 2023; 18:30		(11–7)		Mohamed-Mzali Sports Hall, Monastir

== Final standings ==
Rank	Team
1st place, gold medalist(s)	Egypt
2nd place, silver medalist(s)	Guinea
3rd place, bronze medalist(s)	Nigeria
4	Angola
5	Tunisia
6	Morocco
7	Algeria
8	DR Congo

Team qualified for the 2024 Youth World Championship
