= 2022 African Women's Junior Handball Championship =

Tournament details
- Host country: Guinea
- Venue: 1 (in 1 host city)
- Dates: 19–26 February
- Teams: 12 (from 1 confederation)

Final positions
- Champions: Angola (10th title)
- Runners-up: Egypt
- Third place: Tunisia
- Fourth place: Guinea

Tournament statistics
- Matches played: 20
- Goals scored: 1,171 (58.55 per match)

The 2022 African Women's Junior Handball Championship was held in Conakry, Guinea from 19 to 26 February 2022. It also acted as qualification tournament for the 2022 Women's Junior World Handball Championship to be held in Slovenia.

== Draw ==
The draw was held on 15 January 2022 at the CAHB headquarters in Abidjan, Ivory Coast.

== Preliminary round ==
All times are local (UTC±0).

=== Group A ===
Pos	Team	Pld	W	D	L	GF	GA	GD	Pts	Qualification
1	Angola	3	2	1	0	123	62	+61	5	Semifinals
2	Egypt	3	2	1	0	122	67	+55	5	Semifinals
3	Burkina Faso	3	1	0	2	73	119	−46	2	5–8th place semifinals
4	Zambia	3	0	0	3	66	136	−70	0	5–8th place semifinals

Rules for classification: 1) Points; 2) Head-to-head points; 3) Head-to-head goal difference; 4) Head-to-head goals scored; 5) Goal difference; 6) Goals scored; 7) Draw.

19 February 2022; 11:00	Angola	42–16	Burkina Faso	Stade du 28 Septembre, Conakry
19 February 2022; 11:00		(21–6)		Stade du 28 Septembre, Conakry

19 February 2022; 15:00	Egypt	47–18	Zambia	Stade du 28 Septembre, Conakry
19 February 2022; 15:00		(20–6)		Stade du 28 Septembre, Conakry

20 February 2022; 12:00	Egypt	51–25	Burkina Faso	Stade du 28 Septembre, Conakry
20 February 2022; 12:00		(26–14)		Stade du 28 Septembre, Conakry

20 February 2022; 14:00	Angola	57–22	Zambia	Stade du 28 Septembre, Conakry
20 February 2022; 14:00		(35–12)		Stade du 28 Septembre, Conakry

22 February 2022; 12:00	Burkina Faso	32–26	Zambia	Stade du 28 Septembre, Conakry
22 February 2022; 12:00		(15–16)		Stade du 28 Septembre, Conakry

22 February 2022; 16:00	Angola	24–24	Egypt	Stade du 28 Septembre, Conakry
22 February 2022; 16:00		(14–15)		Stade du 28 Septembre, Conakry

=== Group B ===
Pos	Team	Pld	W	D	L	GF	GA	GD	Pts	Qualification
1	Guinea (H)	3	3	0	0	102	75	+27	6	Semifinals
2	Tunisia	3	2	0	1	107	97	+10	4	Semifinals
3	Nigeria	3	1	0	2	100	95	+5	2	5–8th place semifinals
4	Algeria	3	0	0	3	65	107	−42	0	5–8th place semifinals

Rules for classification: 1) Points; 2) Head-to-head points; 3) Head-to-head goal difference; 4) Head-to-head goals scored; 5) Goal difference; 6) Goals scored; 7) Draw.
(H) Hosts

19 February 2022; 13:00	Nigeria	40–42	Tunisia	Stade du 28 Septembre, Conakry
19 February 2022; 13:00		(20–20)		Stade du 28 Septembre, Conakry

19 February 2022; 18:00	Guinea	36–21	Algeria	Stade du 28 Septembre, Conakry
19 February 2022; 18:00		(18–8)		Stade du 28 Septembre, Conakry

20 February 2022; 16:00	Algeria	23–37	Tunisia	Stade du 28 Septembre, Conakry
20 February 2022; 16:00		(7–20)		Stade du 28 Septembre, Conakry

20 February 2022; 18:00	Nigeria	26–32	Guinea	Stade du 28 Septembre, Conakry
20 February 2022; 18:00		(12–17)		Stade du 28 Septembre, Conakry

22 February 2022; 14:00	Algeria	21–34	Nigeria	Stade du 28 Septembre, Conakry
22 February 2022; 14:00		(8–16)		Stade du 28 Septembre, Conakry

22 February 2022; 18:00	Guinea	34–28	Tunisia	Stade du 28 Septembre, Conakry
22 February 2022; 18:00		(13–16)		Stade du 28 Septembre, Conakry

== Knockout stage ==
=== Bracket ===
Semifinals
24 February
Angola	37
Tunisia	27
24 February
Guinea	23
Egypt	27

Final
26 February
Angola	18
Egypt	17
Third place
26 February
Guinea	27
Tunisia	30

5–8th place bracket

5–8th place semifinals
24 February
Burkina Faso	17
Algeria	27
24 February
Nigeria	35
Zambia	26

Fifth place
25 February
Algeria	26
Nigeria	25
Seventh place
25 February
Burkina Faso	34
Zambia	17

=== 5–8th place semifinals ===
24 February 2022; 12:00	Burkina Faso	17–27	Algeria	Stade du 28 Septembre, Conakry
24 February 2022; 12:00		(10–10)		Stade du 28 Septembre, Conakry

24 February 2022; 14:00	Nigeria	35–26	Zambia	Stade du 28 Septembre, Conakry
24 February 2022; 14:00		(20–9)		Stade du 28 Septembre, Conakry

=== Semifinals ===
24 February 2022; 16:00	Angola	37–27	Tunisia	Stade du 28 Septembre, Conakry
24 February 2022; 16:00		(19–12)		Stade du 28 Septembre, Conakry

24 February 2022; 18:00	Guinea	23–27	Egypt	Stade du 28 Septembre, Conakry
24 February 2022; 18:00		(16–16)		Stade du 28 Septembre, Conakry

=== Seventh place game ===
25 February 2022; 16:00	Burkina Faso	34–17	Zambia	Stade du 28 Septembre, Conakry
25 February 2022; 16:00		(15–8)		Stade du 28 Septembre, Conakry

=== Fifth place game ===
25 February 2022; 18:00	Algeria	26–25	Nigeria	Stade du 28 Septembre, Conakry
25 February 2022; 18:00		(12–14)		Stade du 28 Septembre, Conakry

=== Third place game ===
26 February 2022; 16:00	Guinea	27–30	Tunisia	Stade du 28 Septembre, Conakry
26 February 2022; 16:00		(14–12)		Stade du 28 Septembre, Conakry

=== Final ===
26 February 2022; 18:00	Angola	18–17	Egypt	Stade du 28 Septembre, Conakry
26 February 2022; 18:00		(9–8)		Stade du 28 Septembre, Conakry

== Final standings ==
Rank	Team
1st place, gold medalist(s)	Angola
2nd place, silver medalist(s)	Egypt
3rd place, bronze medalist(s)	Tunisia
4	Guinea
5	Algeria
6	Nigeria
7	Burkina Faso
8	Zambia

Team qualified for the 2022 Junior World Championship
