= 2015 African Women's Junior Handball Championship =

2015 Junior African Women's Handball Championship
Tournament details
- Host country: Kenya
- Venue(s): 1 (in 1 host city)
- Dates: July 11–18
- Teams: 6 (from 1 confederation)

Final positions
- Champions: Angola (8th title)
- Runner-up: Tunisia
- Third place: Egypt
- Fourth place: Kenya

The 2015 African Women's Junior Handball Championship was the 22nd edition of the African Women's Junior Handball Championship. The event, organized by the African Handball Confederation, under the supervision of the International Handball Federation, took place at the Kasarani Indoor Arena in Nairobi, Kenya, from July 11 to 18 2015. Six teams participated on the tournament. Angola, successfully defended its title after tying the last game with Tunisia. While both teams finished with 11 points, Angola had an edge in the goal difference.

The top three teams qualified for the 2016 Women's Junior World Handball Championship, in Russia.

== All matches ==
All teams played in a round robin system.

All times are local (UTC+3).

Team	Pld	W	D	L	GF	GA	GD	Pts
Angola	5	4	1	0	162	102	+60	9
Tunisia	5	4	1	0	132	102	+30	9
Egypt	5	3	0	2	149	140	+9	6
Kenya	5	2	0	3	127	154	−27	4
Algeria	5	1	0	4	136	154	−18	2
DR Congo	5	0	0	5	96	150	−54	0

=== Day 1 ===
11 July 2015; 16:00	Algeria	30 – 34	Kenya	Kasarani Indoor Arena, Nairobi
11 July 2015; 16:00		(13–16)		Kasarani Indoor Arena, Nairobi

12 July 2015; 15:00	Angola	27 – 20	Egypt	Kasarani Indoor Arena, Nairobi
12 July 2015; 15:00		(14–08)		Kasarani Indoor Arena, Nairobi

17:00	DR Congo	16 – 24	Tunisia	Kasarani Indoor Arena, Nairobi
17:00		(07–12)		Kasarani Indoor Arena, Nairobi

=== Day 2 ===
13 July 2015; 14:00	DR Congo	18–33	Egypt	Kasarani Indoor Arena, Nairobi
13 July 2015; 14:00		(06–16)		Kasarani Indoor Arena, Nairobi

16:00	Angola	37–23	Algeria	Kasarani Indoor Arena, Nairobi
16:00		(17–11)		Kasarani Indoor Arena, Nairobi

18:00	Tunisia	28–18	Kenya	Kasarani Indoor Arena, Nairobi
18:00		(11–09)		Kasarani Indoor Arena, Nairobi

=== Day 3 ===
15 July 2015; 14:00	Egypt	23–34	Tunisia	Kasarani Indoor Arena, Nairobi
15 July 2015; 14:00		(10–14)		Kasarani Indoor Arena, Nairobi

16:00	Algeria	30–21	DR Congo	Kasarani Indoor Arena, Nairobi
16:00		(14–07)		Kasarani Indoor Arena, Nairobi

18:00	Kenya	17–40	Angola	Kasarani Indoor Arena, Nairobi
18:00		(05–17)		Kasarani Indoor Arena, Nairobi

=== Day 4 ===
16 July 2015; 14:00	Tunisia	25–24	Algeria	Kasarani Indoor Arena, Nairobi
16 July 2015; 14:00		(16–09)		Kasarani Indoor Arena, Nairobi

16:00	Kenya	32–36	Egypt	Kasarani Indoor Arena, Nairobi
16:00		(18–16)		Kasarani Indoor Arena, Nairobi

18:00	Angola	37–21	DR Congo	Kasarani Indoor Arena, Nairobi
18:00		(22–09)		Kasarani Indoor Arena, Nairobi

=== Day 5 ===
18 July 2015; 14:00	Egypt	37 – 29	Algeria	Kasarani Indoor Arena, Nairobi
18 July 2015; 14:00		(15–14)		Kasarani Indoor Arena, Nairobi

16:00	DR Congo	20 – 26	Kenya	Kasarani Indoor Arena, Nairobi
16:00		(15–08)		Kasarani Indoor Arena, Nairobi

18:00	Tunisia	21 – 21	Angola	Kasarani Indoor Arena, Nairobi
18:00		(07–10)		Kasarani Indoor Arena, Nairobi

== Final standings ==
Qualified for the 2016 World Championship

Rank	Team	Record
Gold medal	Angola	4–0
Bronze medal	Tunisia	4–0
Silver medal	Egypt	3–2
4	Kenya	1–4
5	Algeria	1–4
6	DR Congo	0–5

== Awards ==
2015 African Women's Junior Handball Championship winner

Angola
8th title

== See also ==
- 2014 African Women's Handball Championship
- 2015 African Women's Youth Handball Championship
