= 2019 African Women's Junior Handball Championship =

Handball tournament in Niamey, Niger

Tournament details
- Host country: Niger
- Venue: 1 (in 1 host city)
- Dates: 5–14 September
- Teams: 9 (from 1 confederation)

Final positions
- Champions: Tunisia (1st title)
- Runners-up: Angola
- Third place: Guinea
- Fourth place: DR Congo

Tournament statistics
- Matches played: 24
- Goals scored: 1,338 (55.75 per match)

The 2019 African Women's Junior Handball Championship was held in Niamey, Niger, from 5 to 14 September 2019. It also acted as qualification tournament for the 2020 Women's Junior World Handball Championship in Romania.

== Draw ==
The draw was held on 14 August 2019 at the CAHB Headquarters in Abidjan, Ivory Coast.

== Preliminary round ==
All times are local (UTC+1).

=== Group A ===
Pos	Team	Pld	W	D	L	GF	GA	GD	Pts	Qualification
1	Angola	3	3	0	0	96	60	+36	6	Semifinals
2	Guinea	3	1	1	1	98	101	−3	3	Semifinals
3	Senegal	3	1	0	2	83	94	−11	2	5–8th place semifinals
4	Congo	3	0	1	2	74	96	−22	1	5–8th place semifinals

Rules for classification: 1) Points; 2) Head-to-head points; 3) Head-to-head goal difference; 4) Head-to-head goals scored; 5) Goal difference; 6) Goals scored; 7) Draw.

5 September 2019; 12:00	Senegal	33–37	Guinea	Palace of 29 July, Niamey
5 September 2019; 12:00		(14–17)		Palace of 29 July, Niamey

6 September 2019; 14:00	Angola	30–15	Congo	Palace of 29 July, Niamey
6 September 2019; 14:00		(15–9)		Palace of 29 July, Niamey

7 September 2019; 12:00	Senegal	33–26	Congo	Palace of 29 July, Niamey
7 September 2019; 12:00		(17–10)		Palace of 29 July, Niamey

7 September 2019; 14:00	Angola	35–28	Guinea	Palace of 29 July, Niamey
7 September 2019; 14:00		(13–13)		Palace of 29 July, Niamey

9 September 2019; 14:00	Congo	33–33	Guinea	Palace of 29 July, Niamey
9 September 2019; 14:00		(21–15)		Palace of 29 July, Niamey

10 September 2019; 18:00	Angola	31–17	Senegal	Palace of 29 July, Niamey
10 September 2019; 18:00		(13–9)		Palace of 29 July, Niamey

=== Group B ===
Pos	Team	Pld	W	D	L	GF	GA	GD	Pts	Qualification
1	Tunisia	4	4	0	0	149	69	+80	8	Semifinals
2	DR Congo	4	3	0	1	106	102	+4	6	Semifinals
3	Algeria	4	2	0	2	113	103	+10	4	5–8th place semifinals
4	Benin	4	1	0	3	115	120	−5	2	5–8th place semifinals
5	Niger (H)	4	0	0	4	66	155	−89	0	

Rules for classification: 1) Points; 2) Head-to-head points; 3) Head-to-head goal difference; 4) Head-to-head goals scored; 5) Goal difference; 6) Goals scored; 7) Draw.
(H) Hosts

5 September 2019; 14:00	Tunisia	35–21	Benin	Palace of 29 July, Niamey
5 September 2019; 14:00		(16–8)		Palace of 29 July, Niamey

5 September 2019; 18:00	Niger	15–34	Algeria	Palace of 29 July, Niamey
5 September 2019; 18:00		(10–15)		Palace of 29 July, Niamey

7 September 2019; 16:00	Tunisia	28–18	Algeria	Palace of 29 July, Niamey
7 September 2019; 16:00		(13–8)		Palace of 29 July, Niamey

7 September 2019; 18:00	DR Congo	30–18	Niger	Palace of 29 July, Niamey
7 September 2019; 18:00		(15–6)		Palace of 29 July, Niamey

8 September 2019; 10:00	DR Congo	29–24	Benin	Palace of 29 July, Niamey
8 September 2019; 10:00		(14–9)		Palace of 29 July, Niamey

8 September 2019; 12:00	Tunisia	51–13	Niger	Palace of 29 July, Niamey
8 September 2019; 12:00		(23–7)		Palace of 29 July, Niamey

9 September 2019; 16:00	DR Congo	30–25	Algeria	Palace of 29 July, Niamey
9 September 2019; 16:00		(17–16)		Palace of 29 July, Niamey

9 September 2019; 18:00	Benin	40–20	Niger	Palace of 29 July, Niamey
9 September 2019; 18:00		(20–10)		Palace of 29 July, Niamey

10 September 2019; 14:00	DR Congo	17–35	Tunisia	Palace of 29 July, Niamey
10 September 2019; 14:00		(4–18)		Palace of 29 July, Niamey

10 September 2019; 16:00	Algeria	36–30	Benin	Palace of 29 July, Niamey
10 September 2019; 16:00		(19–17)		Palace of 29 July, Niamey

== Knockout stage ==
=== Bracket ===
Semifinals
12 September
Angola	27
DR Congo	14
12 September
Guinea	27
Tunisia	39

Final
14 September
Angola	25
Tunisia	26
Third place
14 September
DR Congo	25
Guinea	37

5–8th place bracket

5–8th place semifinals
12 September
Senegal	32
Benin	27
12 September
Algeria	28
Congo	32

Fifth place
13 September
Senegal	27
Congo	26
Seventh place
13 September
Benin	26
Algeria	30

=== 5–8th place semifinals ===
12 September 2019; 12:00	Senegal	32–27	Benin	Palace of 29 July, Niamey
12 September 2019; 12:00		(13–16)		Palace of 29 July, Niamey

12 September 2019; 14:00	Algeria	28–32	Congo	Palace of 29 July, Niamey
12 September 2019; 14:00		(16–11)		Palace of 29 July, Niamey

=== Semifinals ===
12 September 2019; 16:00	Angola	27–14	DR Congo	Palace of 29 July, Niamey
12 September 2019; 16:00		(11–6)		Palace of 29 July, Niamey

12 September 2019; 18:00	Guinea	27–39	Tunisia	Palace of 29 July, Niamey
12 September 2019; 18:00		(16–20)		Palace of 29 July, Niamey

=== Seventh place game ===
13 September 2019; 14:00	Benin	26–30	Algeria	Palace of 29 July, Niamey
13 September 2019; 14:00		(13–15)		Palace of 29 July, Niamey

=== Fifth place game ===
13 September 2019; 16:00	Senegal	27–26	Congo	Palace of 29 July, Niamey
13 September 2019; 16:00		(14–11)		Palace of 29 July, Niamey

=== Third place game ===
14 September 2019; 15:00	DR Congo	25–37	Guinea	Palace of 29 July, Niamey
14 September 2019; 15:00		(11–17)		Palace of 29 July, Niamey

=== Final ===
14 September 2019; 17:30	Angola	25–26	Tunisia	Palace of 29 July, Niamey
14 September 2019; 17:30		(15–14)		Palace of 29 July, Niamey

== Final standings ==
Rank	Team
1st place, gold medalist(s)	Tunisia
2nd place, silver medalist(s)	Angola
3rd place, bronze medalist(s)	Guinea
4	DR Congo
5	Senegal
6	Congo
7	Algeria
8	Benin
9	Niger

Team qualified for the 2020 Junior World Championship

== Awards ==
2019 African Women's Junior Handball Championship

Tunisia
1st title

Best Player
