= 2017 African Women's Junior Handball Championship =

Tournament details
- Host country: Ivory Coast
- Venue(s): 1 (in 1 host city)
- Dates: 4–10 September
- Teams: 7 (from 1 confederation)

Final positions
- Champions: Angola (9th title)
- Runners-up: Egypt
- Third place: Ivory Coast
- Fourth place: Cape Verde

Tournament statistics
- Matches played: 21
- Goals scored: 1,088 (51.81 per match)

The 2017 African Women's Junior Handball Championship was the 24th edition of the championship organised by the Ivory Coast Handball Federation under the auspices of the African Handball Confederation. It was held in Palais des Sports de Treichville, Abidjan (Ivory Coast) from 4 to 10 September 2017. It was played in under-19 years category. It was the fifth time that Ivory Coast staged the competition. It also acts as qualification tournament for the IHF Women's Junior World Handball Championship. Top three teams i.e. Angola, Egypt and the hosts Ivory Coast qualified for the 2018 Women's Junior World Handball Championship to be held in Hungary.

== Participating teams ==
- Algeria
- Angola (Defending Champion)
- Cape Verde
- DR Congo
- Egypt
- Ivory Coast (Host)
- Mali

== Round-robin ==
All teams played in a round robin system.

Pos	Team	Pld	W	D	L	GF	GA	GD	Pts	Qualification
1st place, gold medalist(s)	Angola	6	6	0	0	211	117	+94	12	2018 Women's Junior World Handball Championship
2nd place, silver medalist(s)	Egypt	6	5	0	1	170	146	+24	10	2018 Women's Junior World Handball Championship
3rd place, bronze medalist(s)	Ivory Coast (H)	6	2	0	4	159	168	−9	4 (Note: Ivory Coast 4 Pts, +5 GD; Cape Verde 4 Pts, +3 GD; DR Congo 4 Pts, +1 GD; Algeria 4 Pts, –1 GD; Mali 4 Pts, –8 GD.)	2018 Women's Junior World Handball Championship
4	Cape Verde	6	2	0	4	140	165	−25	4	
5	DR Congo	6	2	0	4	142	154	−12	4	
6	Algeria	6	2	0	4	131	151	−20	4	
7	Mali	6	2	0	4	135	187	−52	4	

Rules for classification: 1) Points; 2) Head-to-head points; 3) Head-to-head goal difference; 4) Head-to-head goals scored; 5) Goal difference; 6) Goals scored; 7) Draw.
(H) Hosts

== Match results ==
All times are local (UTC+0).

Day 1

4 September 2017; 14:00	Cape Verde	21–23	DR Congo	Palais des Sports, Abidjan
4 September 2017; 14:00		(13–10)		Palais des Sports, Abidjan

4 September 2017; 16:00	Mali	17–50	Angola	Palais des Sports, Abidjan
4 September 2017; 16:00		(9–24)		Palais des Sports, Abidjan

4 September 2017; 18:00	Ivory Coast	33–35	Egypt	Palais des Sports, Abidjan
4 September 2017; 18:00		(12–19)		Palais des Sports, Abidjan

Day 2

5 September 2017; 14:00	Cape Verde	20–37	Angola	Palais des Sports, Abidjan
5 September 2017; 14:00		(10–18)		Palais des Sports, Abidjan

5 September 2017; 16:00	DR Congo	23–27	Mali	Palais des Sports, Abidjan
5 September 2017; 16:00		(12–13)		Palais des Sports, Abidjan

5 September 2017; 18:00	Algeria	24–25	Ivory Coast	Palais des Sports, Abidjan
5 September 2017; 18:00		(13–11)		Palais des Sports, Abidjan

Day 3

6 September 2017; 14:00	Mali	21–28	Cape Verde	Palais des Sports, Abidjan
6 September 2017; 14:00		(9–16)		Palais des Sports, Abidjan

6 September 2017; 16:00	Egypt	28–20	Algeria	Palais des Sports, Abidjan
6 September 2017; 16:00		(13–9)		Palais des Sports, Abidjan

6 September 2017; 18:00	DR Congo	30–26	Ivory Coast	Palais des Sports, Abidjan
6 September 2017; 18:00		(13–11)		Palais des Sports, Abidjan

Day 4

7 September 2017; 14:00	Algeria	25–29	Mali	Palais des Sports, Abidjan
7 September 2017; 14:00		(16–16)		Palais des Sports, Abidjan

7 September 2017; 16:00	Egypt	33–22	Cape Verde	Palais des Sports, Abidjan
7 September 2017; 16:00		(21–8)		Palais des Sports, Abidjan

7 September 2017; 18:00	Angola	29–17	Ivory Coast	Palais des Sports, Abidjan
7 September 2017; 18:00		(15–11)		Palais des Sports, Abidjan

Day 5

8 September 2017; 14:00	Egypt	22–20	DR Congo	Palais des Sports, Abidjan
8 September 2017; 14:00		(7–8)		Palais des Sports, Abidjan

8 September 2017; 16:00	Ivory Coast	30–31	Cape Verde	Palais des Sports, Abidjan
8 September 2017; 16:00		(16–12)		Palais des Sports, Abidjan

8 September 2017; 18:00	Angola	30–19	Algeria	Palais des Sports, Abidjan
8 September 2017; 18:00		(17–6)		Palais des Sports, Abidjan

Day 6

9 September 2017; 14:00	Mali	22–33	Egypt	Palais des Sports, Abidjan
9 September 2017; 14:00		(11–13)		Palais des Sports, Abidjan

9 September 2017; 16:00	DR Congo	25–36	Angola	Palais des Sports, Abidjan
9 September 2017; 16:00		(11–16)		Palais des Sports, Abidjan

9 September 2017; 18:00	Cape Verde	18–21	Algeria	Palais des Sports, Abidjan
9 September 2017; 18:00		(–)		Palais des Sports, Abidjan

Day 7

10 September 2017; 14:00	Ivory Coast	28–19	Mali	Palais des Sports, Abidjan
10 September 2017; 14:00		(15–11)		Palais des Sports, Abidjan

10 September 2017; 16:00	Algeria	22–21	DR Congo	Palais des Sports, Abidjan
10 September 2017; 16:00		(8–10)		Palais des Sports, Abidjan

10 September 2017; 18:00	Angola	29–19	Egypt	Palais des Sports, Abidjan
10 September 2017; 18:00		(16–8)		Palais des Sports, Abidjan

== Awards ==
2017 African Women's Junior Handball Championship winner

Angola
9th title

Best Player

== See also ==
- 2016 African Women's Handball Championship
- 2017 African Women's Youth Handball Championship
