= 2013 African Women's Junior Handball Championship =

International handball tournament

2013 Junior African Women's Handball Championship
Tournament details
- Host country: Congo
- Venue(s): 1 (in 1 host city)
- Dates: September 1–8
- Teams: 7 (from 1 confederation)

Final positions
- Champions: Angola (7th title)
- Runners-up: (Democratic Republic of the Congo) RD Congo
- Third place: Tunisia
- Fourth place: (Republic of the Congo) Congo

Tournament statistics
- Top scorer(s): (Angola) Juliana Machado

The 2013 African Women's Junior Handball Championship was the 20th edition of the African Women's Junior Handball Championship. The event, organized by the African Handball Confederation, under the supervision of the International Handball Federation, took place in the Republic of the Congo, in one host city, Oyo, from September 1 to 8. Seven teams participated on the tournament. Angola, dethroned defending champion Congo thus securing its 7th title.

Angola were the champions and the top three teams qualified for the 2014 Women's Junior World Handball Championship, in Croatia.

== Preliminary round ==
The seven teams were split into two groups. The top two teams from each group advanced to the semi-finals while the last three played for the 5th to 7th places.

=== Group A ===
Team	Pld	W	D	L	GF	GA	GD	Pts
Angola	2	1	1	0	83	36	+47	4
DR Congo	2	1	1	0	71	42	+29	2
Rwanda	2	0	0	2	28	104	–86	0

2 September 2013; 14:00	Angola	58 – 11	Rwanda	Complexe Sportif d'Oyo, Oyo
2 September 2013; 14:00		(25–05)		Complexe Sportif d'Oyo, Oyo

3 September 2013; 14:00	DR Congo	46 – 17	Rwanda	Complexe Sportif d'Oyo, Oyo
3 September 2013; 14:00		(22–08)		Complexe Sportif d'Oyo, Oyo

4 September 2013; 14:00	Angola	25 – 25	DR Congo	Complexe Sportif d'Oyo, Oyo
4 September 2013; 14:00		(08–13)		Complexe Sportif d'Oyo, Oyo

=== Group B ===
Team	Pld	W	D	L	GF	GA	GD	Pts
Tunisia	3	3	0	0	103	62	+41	6
Congo	3	2	0	1	109	59	+50	3
Guinea	3	1	0	2	62	77	–15	3
Mali	3	0	0	3	43	119	–76	0

1 September 2013; 19:00	Congo	46 – 14	Mali	Complexe Sportif d'Oyo, Oyo
1 September 2013; 19:00		(22–06)		Complexe Sportif d'Oyo, Oyo

2 September 2013; 19:00	Tunisia	29 – 18	Guinea	Complexe Sportif d'Oyo, Oyo
2 September 2013; 19:00		(15–09)		Complexe Sportif d'Oyo, Oyo

3 September 2013; 16:00	Tunisia	43 – 15	Mali	Complexe Sportif d'Oyo, Oyo
3 September 2013; 16:00		(12–05)		Complexe Sportif d'Oyo, Oyo

18:00	Guinea	14 – 34	Congo	Complexe Sportif d'Oyo, Oyo
18:00		(05–14)		Complexe Sportif d'Oyo, Oyo

4 September 2013; 16:00	Guinea	30 – 14	Mali	Complexe Sportif d'Oyo, Oyo
4 September 2013; 16:00		(16–08)		Complexe Sportif d'Oyo, Oyo

18:00	Congo	29 – 31	Tunisia	Complexe Sportif d'Oyo, Oyo
18:00		(15–16)		Complexe Sportif d'Oyo, Oyo

== 5-8 Classification ==
=== 5th place match ===
6 September 2013; 12:00	Rwanda	35 – 24	Mali	Complexe Sportif d'Oyo, Oyo
6 September 2013; 12:00		(16–12)		Complexe Sportif d'Oyo, Oyo

7 September 2013; 14:00	Guinea	36 – 16	Rwanda	Complexe Sportif d'Oyo, Oyo
7 September 2013; 14:00		(16–07)		Complexe Sportif d'Oyo, Oyo

== Final round ==
=== Bracket ===
Semifinals
6 September 2013 – Oyo
Angola	35
Congo	32
6 September 2013 – Oyo
Tunisia	18
DR Congo	23

Final
8 September 2013 – Oyo
Angola	23
DR Congo	21
Bronze medal match
8 September 2013 – Oyo
Tunisia	37
Congo	33

=== Semifinals ===
6 September 2013; 16:00	Tunisia	18 – 23	DR Congo	Complexe Sportif d'Oyo, Oyo
6 September 2013; 16:00		(10–10)		Complexe Sportif d'Oyo, Oyo

6 September 2013; 18:00	Angola	35 – 32	Congo	Complexe Sportif d'Oyo, Oyo
6 September 2013; 18:00		(19–16)		Complexe Sportif d'Oyo, Oyo

=== Bronze medal match ===
8 September 2013; 15:00	Tunisia	37 – 33	Congo	Complexe Sportif d'Oyo, Oyo
8 September 2013; 15:00		(20–17)		Complexe Sportif d'Oyo, Oyo

=== Final ===
8 September 2013; 18:00	Angola	23 – 21	DR Congo	Complexe Sportif d'Oyo, Oyo
8 September 2013; 18:00		(13–09)		Complexe Sportif d'Oyo, Oyo

== Final standings ==
Qualified for the 2014 World Championship

Rank	Team	Record
Gold medal	Angola	4–0–0
Silver medal	DR Congo	2–0–2
Bronze medal	Tunisia	4–0–1
4	Congo	1–1–3
5	Guinea	3–0–3
6	Rwanda	1–0–3
7	Mali	0–0–4

== Awards ==
2013 African Women's Junior Handball Championship

Angola
7th title

Best Player

== See also ==
- 2012 African Women's Handball Championship
- 2013 African Women's Youth Handball Championship
