= African Women's Junior Handball Championship =

International handball competition

- Current season, competition or edition: 2025 African Women's Junior Handball Championship
- Sport: Handball
- Founded: 1980
- First season: 1980
- Continent: Africa (CAHB)
- Most recent champion: Egypt (1st title)
- Most titles: Angola (11 titles)

The African Women's Junior Handball Championship is the official competition for junior women's national handball teams of Africa, organized by the African Handball Confederation, under the supervision of the International Handball Federation and takes place every two years. In addition to crowning the African champions, the tournament also serves as a qualifying tournament for the Women's World Junior Championship.

== Summary ==
Year	Host	Final			Third place match (or third place)		
Year	Host	Champion	Score	Runner-up	Third place	Score	Fourth place
1980; Details	(Nigeria); Lagos	Ivory Coast		Nigeria	Tunisia		Egypt
1982; Details	(Benin); Cotonou	Ivory Coast		Nigeria	Congo		
1984; Details	(Nigeria); Bauchi	Ivory Coast	28–15	Congo	Nigeria		
1986; Details	(Algeria); Algiers	Nigeria	12–4	Algeria	Congo	23–19	Angola
1988; Details	(Tunisia); Tunis	Nigeria	No playoffs	Algeria	Angola	No playoffs	Tunisia
1990; Details	(Egypt); Cairo	Nigeria	No playoffs	Angola	Algeria	No playoffs	Egypt
1992; Details	(Tunisia); Tunis	Algeria	15–14	Tunisia	No third place		
1992; Details	(Tunisia); Tunis	Algeria	24–14	Tunisia	No third place		
1994	(Egypt); Cairo	Cancelled due to insufficient number of participants			Cancelled due to insufficient number of participants		
1996; Details	(Egypt); Cairo	Angola					
1998; Details	(Ivory Coast); Abidjan	Angola		Congo	Ivory Coast		Burkina Faso
2000; Details	(Tunisia); Tunis	Angola		Tunisia	Algeria		South Africa
2002; Details	(Benin); Cotonou	Congo	31–24	Angola	Algeria	No playoffs	Tunisia
2004; Details	(Ivory Coast); Abidjan	Angola	No playoffs	Tunisia	Congo	No playoffs	Ivory Coast
2006; Details	(Ivory Coast); Abidjan	Angola	26–19	Algeria	Nigeria	25–22	Ivory Coast
2009; Details	(Ivory Coast); Abidjan	Angola	29–21	Tunisia	DR Congo	20–17	Cameroon
2011; Details	(Burkina Faso); Ouagadougou	Congo	25–24	Angola	Tunisia	34–27	Algeria
2013; Details	(Republic of the Congo); Oyo	Angola	23–21	DR Congo	Tunisia	37–33	Congo
2015; Details	(Kenya); Nairobi	Angola	No playoffs	Tunisia	Egypt	No playoffs	Kenya
2017; Details	(Ivory Coast); Abidjan	Angola	No playoffs	Egypt	Ivory Coast	No playoffs	Cape Verde
2019; Details	(Niger); Niamey	Tunisia	26–25	Angola	Guinea	37–25	DR Congo
2022; Details	(Guinea); Conakry	Angola	18–17	Egypt	Tunisia	30–27	Guinea
2023; Details	(Tunisia); Monastir	Angola	30–26	Egypt	Guinea	36–31	Tunisia
2025; Details	(Algeria); Oran	Egypt	25–22	Guinea	Angola	26–22	Tunisia

== Medal count ==
Rank	Nation	Gold	Silver	Bronze	Total
1	Angola	11	4	3	18
2	Nigeria	3	2	2	7
3	Ivory Coast	3	0	2	5
4	Congo	2	2	2	6
5	Tunisia	1	5	4	10
6	Algeria	1	3	3	7
7	Egypt	1	3	1	5
8	Guinea	0	1	2	3
9	DR Congo	0	1	1	2
Totals (9 entries)		22	21	20	63

== Participation details ==
Nation	(Nigeria) 1980	(Benin) 1982	(Nigeria) 1984	(Algeria) 1986	(Tunisia) 1988	(Egypt) 1990	(Tunisia) 1992	(Egypt) 1996	(Ivory Coast) 1998	(Tunisia) 2000	(Benin) 2002	(Ivory Coast) 2004	(Ivory Coast) 2006	(Ivory Coast) 2009	(Burkina Faso) 2011	(Republic of the Congo) 2013	(Kenya) 2015	(Ivory Coast) 2017	(Niger) 2019	(Guinea) 2022	(Tunisia) 2023	(Algeria) 2025	Years
Algeria			5th	2nd	2nd	3rd	1st			3rd	3rd		2nd	7th	4th		5th	6th	7th	5th	5th	5th	16
Angola				4th	3rd	2nd		1st	1st	1st	2nd	1st	1st	1st	2nd	1st	1st	1st	2nd	1st	1st	3rd	18
Benin		5th																	8				2
Burkina Faso									4th						8th					7th		7th	4
Cameroon														4th									1
Cape Verde																		4th					1
Congo		3rd	2nd	3rd					2nd		1st	3rd		5th	1st	4th			6th				9
DR Congo													DSQ	3rd	5th	2nd	6th	5th	4th		9th	9th	9
Egypt	4th					4th		Q							6th		3rd	2nd		2nd	2nd	1st	9
Ghana													6th										1
Guinea												DSQ				5th			3rd	4th	3rd	2nd	5
Ivory Coast	1st	1st	1st	5th				Q	3rd			4th	4th	6th	7th			3rd			6th	6th	13
Kenya																	4th				7th	8th	3
Madagascar																					10th		1
Mali																7th		7th			8th	10th	4
Morocco					WD																		0
Niger																			9th				1
Nigeria	2nd	2nd	3rd	1st	1st	1st							3rd							6th			8
Réunion																						WD	0
Rwanda																6th							1
Senegal													5th						5th				2
South Africa										4th													1
Tunisia	3rd			6th	4th		2nd	Q		2nd	4th	2nd		2nd	3rd	3rd	2nd		1st	3rd	4th	4th	15
Zambia																				8th		11th	2
Teams				6	4	4	2	4	4	4		4	8	6	7	7	6	7	9	8	10	11	

== See also ==
- African Women's Handball Championship
- African Women's Youth Handball Championship
