= 2017 African Women's Youth Handball Championship =

Tournament details
- Host country: Ivory Coast
- Venue(s): 1 (in 1 host city)
- Dates: 11–17 September
- Teams: 7 (from 1 confederation)

Final positions
- Champions: Egypt (2nd title)
- Runners-up: Tunisia
- Third place: Angola
- Fourth place: Senegal

Tournament statistics
- Matches played: 21
- Goals scored: 1,094 (52.1 per match)

The 2017 African Women's Youth Handball Championship was the 13th edition of the championship organised by the Ivory Coast Handball Federation under the auspices of the African Handball Confederation. It was held in Palais des Sports de Treichville, Abidjan (Ivory Coast) from 11 to 17 September 2017. It was played in under-17 years category. It was the third time that Ivory Coast staged the competition. It also acts as qualification tournament for the IHF Women's Youth World Handball Championship. Top three teams i.e. Egypt, Tunisia and Angola qualifies for the 2018 Women's Youth World Handball Championship to be held in Poland.

== Participating teams ==
- Egypt (Defending Champion)
- Tunisia
- Angola
- Senegal
- DR Congo
- Algeria
- Ivory Coast (Host)

== Round-robin ==
All teams played in a round robin system.

All times are local (UTC+0).

Team	Pld	W	D	L	GF	GA	GD	Pts
Egypt	6	6	0	0	173	99	+74	12
Tunisia	6	4	1	1	195	155	+40	9
Angola	6	4	1	1	162	135	+27	9
Senegal	6	3	0	3	162	158	+4	6
DR Congo	6	2	0	4	131	166	−35	4
Ivory Coast	6	1	0	5	136	171	−35	2
Algeria	6	0	0	6	135	210	−75	0

== Match results ==
11 September 2017; 14:00	Angola	26–19	DR Congo	Palais des Sports de Treichville, Abidjan

11 September 2017; 16:00	Tunisia	41–30	Algeria	Palais des Sports de Treichville, Abidjan

11 September 2017; 18:00	Ivory Coast	25–28	Senegal	Palais des Sports de Treichville, Abidjan

12 September 2017; 14:00	DR Congo	26–20	Algeria	Palais des Sports de Treichville, Abidjan

12 September 2017; 16:00	Tunisia	41–28	Ivory Coast	Palais des Sports de Treichville, Abidjan

12 September 2017; 18:00	Egypt	33–17	Senegal	Palais des Sports de Treichville, Abidjan

13 September 2017; 14:00	Angola	37–18	Algeria	Palais des Sports de Treichville, Abidjan

13 September 2017; 16:00	Ivory Coast	8–23	Egypt	Palais des Sports de Treichville, Abidjan

13 September 2017; 18:00	Tunisia	30–26	Senegal	Palais des Sports de Treichville, Abidjan

14 September 2017; 14:00	Algeria	14–36	Egypt	Palais des Sports de Treichville, Abidjan

14 September 2017; 16:00	Senegal	22–23	Angola	Palais des Sports de Treichville, Abidjan

14 September 2017; 18:00	DR Congo	27–22	Ivory Coast	Palais des Sports de Treichville, Abidjan

15 September 2017; 14:00	Egypt	23–19	Tunisia	Palais des Sports de Treichville, Abidjan

15 September 2017; 16:00	Senegal	27–18	DR Congo	Palais des Sports de Treichville, Abidjan

15 September 2017; 18:00	Ivory Coast	25–28	Angola	Palais des Sports de Treichville, Abidjan

16 September 2017; 14:00	DR Congo	22–38	Tunisia	Palais des Sports de Treichville, Abidjan

16 September 2017; 16:00	Ivory Coast	28–24	Algeria	Palais des Sports de Treichville, Abidjan

16 September 2017; 18:00	Egypt	25–22	Angola	Palais des Sports de Treichville, Abidjan

17 September 2017; 12:00	Algeria	29–42	Senegal	Palais des Sports de Treichville, Abidjan

17 September 2017; 14:00	Egypt	33–19	DR Congo	Palais des Sports de Treichville, Abidjan

17 September 2017; 16:00	Angola	26–26	Tunisia	Palais des Sports de Treichville, Abidjan

== Final standings ==
Rank	Team
1st place, gold medalist(s)	Egypt
2nd place, silver medalist(s)	Tunisia
3rd place, bronze medalist(s)	Angola
4	Senegal
5	DR Congo
6	Ivory Coast
7	Algeria

Team qualified for the 2018 Women's Youth World Handball Championship

== See also ==
- 2017 African Women's Junior Handball Championship
- 2016 African Women's Handball Championship
- 2016 African Men's Youth Handball Championship
