= African Women's Youth Handball Championship =

International handball competition

- Current season, competition or edition: 2025 African Women's Youth Handball Championship
- Sport: Handball
- Founded: 2000
- First season: 2000
- Continent: Africa (CAHB)
- Most recent champion: Egypt (6th title)
- Most titles: Egypt (6 titles)

The African Women's Youth Handball Championship is the official competition for youth women's national handball teams of Africa, organized by the African Handball Confederation, under the supervision of the International Handball Federation and takes place every two years. In addition to crowning the African champions, the tournament also serves as a qualifying tournament for the Youth World Championship.

== Summary ==
Year	Host	Final			Third place match		
Year	Host	Champion	Score	Runner-up	Third place	Score	Fourth place
2000; Details	(Ivory Coast); Abidjan	Ivory Coast	–	Nigeria	No third place		
2004	(Morocco); Casablanca	No team entered			No team entered		
2009; Details	(Ivory Coast); Abidjan	Angola	29–17	Ivory Coast	DR Congo	No playoffs	None awarded
2011; Details	(Burkina Faso); Ouagadougou	Angola	19–16	DR Congo	Tunisia	19–17	Congo
2013; Details	(Republic of the Congo); Oyo	Angola	29–18	Tunisia	Congo	21–18	Senegal
2015; Details	(Kenya); Nairobi	Egypt	No playoffs	Angola	DR Congo	No playoffs	Kenya
2017; Details	(Ivory Coast); Abidjan	Egypt	No playoffs	Tunisia	Angola	No playoffs	Senegal
2019; Details	(Niger); Niamey	Egypt	No playoffs	Angola	Tunisia	No playoffs	Guinea
2022; Details	(Guinea); Conakry	Egypt	No playoffs	Guinea	Algeria	No playoffs	Gambia
2023; Details	(Tunisia); Monastir	Egypt	29–16	Guinea	Nigeria	28–24	Angola
2025; Details	(Algeria); Oran	Egypt	33–21	Tunisia	Guinea	18–11	Angola

== Most successful national teams ==
Rank	Team	Champions	Runners-up	Third-place	Fourth-place
1	Egypt	6 (2015, 2017, 2019, 2022, 2023, 2025)	–	–	–
2	Angola	3 (2009, 2011, 2013)	2 (2015, 2019)	1 (2017)	2 (2023, 2025)
3	Ivory Coast	1 (2000)	1 (2009)	–	–
4	Tunisia	–	3 (2013, 2017, 2025)	2 (2011, 2019)	–
5	Guinea	–	2 (2022, 2023)	1 (2025)	1 (2019)
6	DR Congo	–	1 (2011)	2 (2009, 2015)	–
7	Nigeria	–	1 (2000)	1 (2023)	–
8	Congo	–	–	1 (2013)	1 (2011)
9	Algeria	–	–	1 (2022)	–
10	Senegal	–	–	–	2 (2013, 2017)
11	Kenya	–	–	–	1 (2015)
12	Gambia	–	–	–	1 (2022)

== Participating nations ==
Nation	(Ivory Coast) 2000	(Ivory Coast) 2009	(Burkina Faso) 2011	(Republic of the Congo) 2013	(Kenya) 2015	(Ivory Coast) 2017	(Niger) 2019	(Guinea) 2022	(Tunisia) 2023	(Algeria) 2025	Years
Algeria						7th	5th	3rd	7th	6th	5
Angola		1st	1st	1st	2nd	3rd	2nd		4th	4th	8
Benin										9th	1
Burkina Faso			5th							8th	2
Congo			4th	3rd							2
DR Congo		3rd	2nd	5th	3rd	5th	6th		8th		7
Egypt					1st	1st	1st	1st	1st	1st	6
Gambia								4th			1
Guinea				6th			4th	2nd	2nd	3rd	5
Guinea-Bissau								6th			1
Ivory Coast	1st	2nd				6th					3
Kenya					4th					7th	2
Madagascar										11th	1
Mali			6th								1
Morocco									6th		1
Niger							7th				1
Nigeria	2nd								3rd	5th	3
Senegal				4th		4th					2
Sierra Leone								5th			1
Tunisia			3rd	2nd		2nd	3rd		5th	2nd	6
Zambia				7th						10th	2
# Teams	2	3	6	7	4	7	7	6	8	11	

== See also ==
- African Women's Junior Handball Championship
- African Men's Youth Handball Championship
