= Mansourou Aremou =

Beninese assistant professor and sports administrator

Mansourou Adolphe Aremou (Benin)

4th President of African Handball Confederation
- Incumbent
- Assumed office September 2008
- Preceded by: Christophe Yapo Achy

Vice-President (Africa) of International Handball Federation
- Incumbent
- Assumed office 2008
- President: Hassan Moustafa
- Preceded by: Christophe Yapo Achy

President of Benin Handball Federation
- In office 2005–2012

4th Secretary General of African Handball Confederation
- In office 2000–2008
- Preceded by: Ferdinand Kitsadi Zorrino
- Succeeded by: Nicole Assele

Personal details
- Born: April 16, 1952 (age 74) Cotonou, French Dahomey (now Benin)
- Education: PhD
- Alma mater: University of Bordeaux
- Occupation: Professor
- Profession: Sports administrator

Mansourou Adolphe Aremou (born 16 April 1952) is a Beninese assistant professor and sports administrator. He was assistant professor at the National University of Benin from 1987 to 2009. Alongside his teaching activities, he held executive positions in the world of handball. He is the current President of African Handball Confederation (CAHB) since September 2008. He also holds the position of vice-president in the International Handball Federation since 2008.
