= 2022 African Women's Youth Handball Championship =

Tournament details
- Host country: Guinea
- Venue: 1 (in 1 host city)
- Dates: 27 February – 4 March
- Teams: 6 (from 1 confederation)

Final positions
- Champions: Egypt (4th title)
- Runners-up: Guinea
- Third place: Algeria
- Fourth place: Gambia

Tournament statistics
- Matches played: 15
- Goals scored: 1,049 (69.93 per match)

The 2022 African Women's Youth Handball Championship was held in Conakry, Guinea from 27 February to 4 March 2022. It also acted as the qualification tournament for the 2022 Women's Youth World Handball Championship to be held in Georgia.

== Results ==
All times are local (UTC±0).

Pos	Team	Pld	W	D	L	GF	GA	GD	Pts	Qualification
1st place, gold medalist(s)	Egypt	5	5	0	0	293	81	+212	10	2022 Youth World Championship
2nd place, silver medalist(s)	Guinea (H)	5	4	0	1	282	95	+187	8	2022 Youth World Championship
3rd place, bronze medalist(s)	Algeria	5	3	0	2	183	144	+39	6	2022 Youth World Championship
4	Gambia	5	2	0	3	103	218	−115	4	
5	Sierra Leone	5	1	0	4	116	237	−121	2	
6	Guinea-Bissau	5	0	0	5	72	274	−202	0	

Rules for classification: 1) Points; 2) Head-to-head points; 3) Head-to-head goal difference; 4) Head-to-head goals scored; 5) Goal difference; 6) Goals scored; 7) Draw.
(H) Hosts

27 February 2022; 14:00	Algeria	52–22	Guinea-Bissau	Stade du 28 Septembre, Conakry
27 February 2022; 14:00		(24–6)		Stade du 28 Septembre, Conakry

27 February 2022; 16:00	Egypt	70–12	Sierra Leone	Stade du 28 Septembre, Conakry
27 February 2022; 16:00		(40–5)		Stade du 28 Septembre, Conakry

27 February 2022; 18:00	Guinea	57–13	Gambia	Stade du 28 Septembre, Conakry
27 February 2022; 18:00		(22–5)		Stade du 28 Septembre, Conakry

28 February 2022; 14:00	Egypt	78–7	Guinea-Bissau	Stade du 28 Septembre, Conakry
28 February 2022; 14:00		(35–6)		Stade du 28 Septembre, Conakry

28 February 2022; 16:00	Gambia	10–49	Algeria	Stade du 28 Septembre, Conakry
28 February 2022; 16:00		(5–23)		Stade du 28 Septembre, Conakry

28 February 2022; 18:00	Guinea	75–18	Sierra Leone	Stade du 28 Septembre, Conakry
28 February 2022; 18:00		(35–10)		Stade du 28 Septembre, Conakry

1 March 2022; 14:00	Egypt	57–11	Gambia	Stade du 28 Septembre, Conakry
1 March 2022; 14:00		(24–7)		Stade du 28 Septembre, Conakry

1 March 2022; 16:00	Sierra Leone	32–15	Guinea-Bissau	Stade du 28 Septembre, Conakry
1 March 2022; 16:00		(17–6)		Stade du 28 Septembre, Conakry

1 March 2022; 18:00	Guinea	39–22	Algeria	Stade du 28 Septembre, Conakry
1 March 2022; 18:00		(22–14)		Stade du 28 Septembre, Conakry

3 March 2022; 14:00	Gambia	37–34	Sierra Leone	Stade du 28 Septembre, Conakry
3 March 2022; 14:00		(14–16)		Stade du 28 Septembre, Conakry

3 March 2022; 16:00	Egypt	53–20	Algeria	Stade du 28 Septembre, Conakry
3 March 2022; 16:00		(25–9)		Stade du 28 Septembre, Conakry

3 March 2022; 18:00	Guinea	80–7	Guinea-Bissau	Stade du 28 Septembre, Conakry
3 March 2022; 18:00		(37–2)		Stade du 28 Septembre, Conakry

4 March 2022; 14:00	Algeria	40–20	Sierra Leone	Stade du 28 Septembre, Conakry
4 March 2022; 14:00		(20–6)		Stade du 28 Septembre, Conakry

4 March 2022; 16:00	Guinea-Bissau	21–32	Gambia	Stade du 28 Septembre, Conakry
4 March 2022; 16:00		(10–14)		Stade du 28 Septembre, Conakry

4 March 2022; 18:00	Guinea	31–35	Egypt	Stade du 28 Septembre, Conakry
4 March 2022; 18:00		(13–14)		Stade du 28 Septembre, Conakry
