= Egypt women's national youth handball team =

Egypt women's Nation youth handball team

Egypt

Information
- Nickname: The Cleopatras
- Association: Egyptian Handball Federation
- Coach: Mohamed Abdelkarim

Colours
1st	2nd

Results

IHF U-18 World Championship
- Appearances: 5 (First in 2016)
- Best result: 4th (2026)

African Youth Championship
- Appearances: 6 (First in 2015)
- Best result: (gold) 1st (2015, 2017, 2019, 2022, 2023, 2025)
- Last updated on Unknown.

The Egypt women's national youth handball team represents Egypt in Women's Youth Handball. It is administered by the Egyptian Handball Federation.

== Competitive record ==
=== World Championship ===
IHF Women's U18 Handball World Championship
Year	Round	Position	GP	W	D	L	GS	GA	GD
2006 Canada	Did not qualify								
2008 Slovakia	Did not qualify								
2010 Dominican Republic	Did not qualify								
2012 Montenegro	Did not qualify								
2014 North Macedonia	Did not qualify								
2016 Slovakia	Round of 16	9th of 24	7	5	0	2	215	227	-12
2018 Poland	Preliminary Round	23rd of 24	7	1	0	6	146	199	-53
2020 Croatia	Cancelled								
2022 North Macedonia	Quarter-Final	7th of 32	9	5	1	3	279	260	+19
2024 China	Preliminary Round	21st of 32	7	3	1	3	179	179	0
2026 Romania	Semifinals	4th of 32	8	6	0	2	265	193	+62
Total	Qualified: 5/10		38	20	2	16	1085	1058	+16

=== African Championship ===
African Women's Youth Handball Championship
Games	Round	Position	Pld	W	D	L	GF	GA	GD
2000 Ivory Coast	Did not enter								
2004 Morocco	Cancelled								
2009 Ivory Coast	Did not enter								
2011 Burkina Faso	Did not enter								
2013 Republic of the Congo	Did not enter								
2015 Kenya	Final	Champions	6	5	0	1	204	132	+72
2017 Ivory Coast	Final	Champions	6	6	0	0	173	99	+74
2019 Niger	Final	Champions	6	6	0	0	207	109	+98
2022 Guinea	Final	Champions	5	5	0	0	293	81	+212
2023 Tunisia	Final	Champions	6	6	0	0	166	87	+79
2025 Algeria	Final	Champions	6	6	0	0	154	89	+65
Total	Qualified: 6/11		35	28	0	1	1197	597	+600

== See also ==
- Egypt women's national handball team
- Egypt women's national junior handball team
