= Tunisia women's national youth handball team =

Tunisia Women U-17

Information
- Nickname: نسور قرطاج (Eagles of Carthage)
- Association: Tunisian Handball Federation
- Coach: Abdelmajid Gaddour

Colours
1st	2nd

Results

IHF U-18 World Championship
- Appearances: 5 (First in 2006)
- Best result: 11th : 2006

African Youth Championship
- Appearances: 5 (First in 2011)
- Best result: Runners-up (silver) (2): 2013, 2017
- Last updated on Unknown.

Tunisia women's national youth handball team
Medal record

Representing Tunisia

Handball

African Youth Championship
Silver medal – second place	2013	
Silver medal – second place	2017	
Bronze medal – third place	2011	
Bronze medal – third place	2019	

The Tunisia women's national youth handball team (Arabic: منتخب تونس للإناث تحت 17 سنة لكرة اليد), nicknamed Les Aigles de Carthage (The Eagles of Carthage or The Carthage Eagles), represents Tunisia in the international handball competitions and it is controlled by the Tunisian Handball Federation

== History ==
=== Youth Olympic Games ===
Champions Runners up Third place Fourth place

- Red border color indicates tournament was held on home soil.

Youth Olympic Games record
Year	Round	Position	GP	W	D	L	GS	GA	GD
Singapore 2010	Didn't qualify								
China 2014	Didn't qualify								
Argentina 2018	No Handball Event								
Senegal 2022	No Handball Event								
Total	0 / 2	0 Titles							

=== World Championship ===
Youth World Championship record
Year	Round	Position	GP	W	D	L	GS	GA	GD
Canada 2006		11th							
Slovakia 2008		12th							
Dominican Republic 2010		Did not compete							
Montenegro 2012		Did not compete							
(North Macedonia) Macedonia 2014		18th							
Slovakia 2016		Did not compete							
Poland 2018		16th							
Croatia 2020	Cancelled due to the COVID-19 pandemic								
(Georgia (country)) Georgia 2022		Did not compete							
China 2024		Did not compete							
Romania 2026		20th							
5/10	0 Titles								

=== African Championship ===
African Youth Championship record
Year	Reached	Position	GP	W	D	L	GS	GA	GD
Ivory Coast 2000	Did not participate								
Ivory Coast 2009	Did not participate								
Burkina Faso 2011	Semi final	3rd	4	2	0	2	81	76	+5
(Republic of the Congo) Congo 2013	Final	2nd	4	2	0	2	106	96	+10
Kenya 2015	Did not participate								
Ivory Coast 2017	No playoffs	2nd	6	4	1	1	195	155	+40
Niger 2019	No playoffs	3rd	6	3	1	2	158	147	+11
Guinea 2022	Did not participate								
Tunisia 2023	Quarterfinals	5th	6	3	2	1	151	120	+31
Total	5/9	0 Titles	26	14	4	8	691	594	+97

== See also ==
- Tunisia women's national handball team
- Tunisia women's national junior handball team
- Tunisia men's national youth handball team

Other handball codes

- Tunisia women's national beach handball team
