= 2016 African Men's Youth Handball Championship =

Tournament details
- Host country: Mali
- Venue(s): 1 (in 1 host city)
- Dates: September 2–9, 2016
- Teams: 8 (from 1 confederation)

Final positions
- Champions: Tunisia (1st title)
- Runner-up: Egypt
- Third place: Algeria
- Fourth place: DR Congo

Tournament statistics
- Matches played: 24
- Goals scored: 1,299 (54.13 per match)
- Top scorer(s): Rahmani Youcef (38)

The 2016 African Men's Youth Handball Championship was the 7th edition of the tournament, organized by the African Handball Confederation, under the auspices of the International Handball Federation and held at the Palais des Sports de l'ACI 2000 in Bamako, Mali from September 2 to 9, 2016.

Tunisia was the champion and qualified, alongside the three remaining top teams. to the 2017 world championship.

== Draw ==
Group A	Group B
Algeria; Guinea; Mali; Morocco	Egypt; DR Congo; Rwanda; Tunisia

== Preliminary round ==
All times are local (UTC+0).

=== Group A ===
2 Sep, 2016
13:00	Algeria	33 (20:06) 22	Morocco
16:00	Mali	20 (07:19) 39	Guinea
3 Sep, 2016
15:00	Morocco	24 (12:10) 28	Guinea
19:00	Algeria	46 (21:09) 16	Mali
4 Sep, 2016
17:00	Guinea	27 (14:15) 32	Algeria
19:00	Mali	11 (06:15) 36	Morocco

Team	Pld	W	D	L	GF	GA	GD	Pts	Qualification
Algeria	3	3	0	0	111	65	+46	6	Advance to the quarter-finals
Guinea	3	2	0	1	94	76	+18	4	Advance to the quarter-finals
Morocco	3	1	0	2	82	72	+10	2	Advance to the quarter-finals
Mali (H)	3	0	0	3	47	121	−74	0	Advance to the quarter-finals

(H) Hosts

=== Group B ===
2 Sep, 2016
10:00	DR Congo	45 (22:07) 15	Rwanda
15:00	Egypt	34 (16:15) 27	Tunisia
3 Sep, 2016
13:00	Rwanda	12 (05:31) 56	Egypt
17:00	Tunisia	27 (12:11) 20	DR Congo
4 Sep, 2016
13:00	Egypt	33 (16:11) 22	DR Congo
15:00	Tunisia	40 (20:03) 7	Rwanda

Team	Pld	W	D	L	GF	GA	GD	Pts	Qualification
Egypt	3	3	0	0	123	61	+62	6	Advance to the quarter-finals
Tunisia	3	2	0	1	94	61	+33	4	Advance to the quarter-finals
DR Congo	3	1	0	2	87	75	+12	2	Advance to the quarter-finals
Rwanda	3	0	0	3	34	141	−107	0	Advance to the quarter-finals

== Knockout stage ==
Championship bracket

Quarter-finals
Tue 6 Sep 2016 – 15:00
Tunisia	35
Morocco	21
Tue 6 Sep 2016 – 13:00
Algeria	45
Rwanda	10
Tue 6 Sep 2016 – 17:00
Guinea	25
DR Congo	31
Tue 6 Sep 2016 – 19:00
Mali	12
Egypt	46

Semi-finals
Wed 7 Sep 2016 – 17:00
Algeria	23
Tunisia	27
Wed 7 Sep 2016 – 19:00
DR Congo	15
Egypt	35

Final
Fri 9 Sep 2016 – 16:00
Tunisia	26
Egypt	25
Third place
Fri 9 Sep 2016 – 14:00
Algeria	22
DR Congo	15

5-8th bracket

Semifinals
Wed 7 Sep 2016 – 13:00
Rwanda	21
Morocco	29
Wed 7 Sep 2016 – 15:00
Guinea	45
Mali	20

Fifth place
Thu 8 Sep 2016 – 16:00
Morocco	21
Guinea	19
Seventh place
Thu 8 Sep 2016 – 14:00
Rwanda	30
Mali	29

== Final standings ==
Qualified for the 2017 World Championship

Rank	Team	Record
Gold medal	Tunisia	5–1
Silver medal	Egypt	5–1
Bronze medal	Algeria	5–1
4	DR Congo	2–4
5	Morocco	3–3
6	Guinea	3–3
7	Rwanda	1–5
8	Mali	0–6

== Awards ==
2016 African Men's Youth Handball Championship winner

Tunisia
1st title

== See also ==
- 2016 African Men's Handball Championship
- 2016 African Men's Junior Handball Championship
