= 2013 African Women's Youth Handball Championship =

2013 Youth African Women's Handball Championship
Tournament details
- Host country: Congo
- Venue(s): 1 (in 1 host city)
- Dates: August 24–30
- Teams: 7 (from 1 confederation)

Final positions
- Champions: Angola (3rd title)
- Runner-up: Tunisia
- Third place: Congo
- Fourth place: Senegal

Tournament statistics
- Matches played: 16
- Goals scored: 802 (50.13 per match)
- Top scorer(s): (Angola) Nicol Costa (38)

The 2013 African Women's Youth Handball Championship was the 8th edition of the African Women's Youth Handball Championship. The event, organized by the African Handball Confederation, under the supervision of the International Handball Federation, took place in the Republic of the Congo, in one host city, Oyo, from August 24 to 30. Seven teams participated on the tournament. Angola, the defending champion, retained its title, by beating Tunisia 29-18 in the final.

The tournament also served as the qualification for the 2014 Women's Youth World Handball Championship, in Macedonia.

== Draw ==
Group A	Group B
Angola; Tunisia; Zambia	Congo; DR Congo; Guinea; Senegal

== Preliminary round ==
The seven teams were divided into two groups. Top two teams from each group advanced to the semi-finals while the last three played for the 5th to 7th places.

=== Group A ===
Team	Pld	W	D	L	GF	GA	GD	Pts
Angola	2	2	0	0	80	16	+64	4
Tunisia	2	1	0	1	63	43	+20	2
Zambia	2	0	0	2	26	110	−84	0

24 August 2013; 14:00	Angola	57 – 06	Zambia	Complexe Sportif d'Oyo, Oyo
24 August 2013; 14:00		(26–02)		Complexe Sportif d'Oyo, Oyo

25 August 2013; 14:00	Tunisia	53 – 20	Zambia	Complexe Sportif d'Oyo, Oyo
25 August 2013; 14:00		(23–09)		Complexe Sportif d'Oyo, Oyo

26 August 2013; 16:00	Angola	23 – 10	Tunisia	Complexe Sportif d'Oyo, Oyo
26 August 2013; 16:00		(14–04)		Complexe Sportif d'Oyo, Oyo

=== Group B ===
Team	Pld	W	D	L	GF	GA	GD	Pts
Congo	3	3	0	0	80	61	+19	6
Senegal	3	1	1	1	72	54	+18	3
DR Congo	3	1	1	1	71	63	+8	3
Guinea	3	0	0	3	54	89	−35	0

23 August 2013; 19:00	Congo	26 – 21	Senegal	Complexe Sportif d'Oyo, Oyo
23 August 2013; 19:00		(10–12)		Complexe Sportif d'Oyo, Oyo

24 August 2013; 16:00	DR Congo	23 – 23	Senegal	Complexe Sportif d'Oyo, Oyo
24 August 2013; 16:00		(11–10)		Complexe Sportif d'Oyo, Oyo

24 August 2013; 18:00	Congo	32 – 21	Guinea	Complexe Sportif d'Oyo, Oyo
24 August 2013; 18:00		(18–09)		Complexe Sportif d'Oyo, Oyo

25 August 2013; 16:00	Guinea	15 – 28	Senegal	Complexe Sportif d'Oyo, Oyo
25 August 2013; 16:00		(05–12)		Complexe Sportif d'Oyo, Oyo

25 August 2013; 18:00	DR Congo	19 – 22	Congo	Complexe Sportif d'Oyo, Oyo
25 August 2013; 18:00		(10–10)		Complexe Sportif d'Oyo, Oyo

26 August 2013; 14:00	DR Congo	29 – 18	Guinea	Complexe Sportif d'Oyo, Oyo
26 August 2013; 14:00		(14–10)		Complexe Sportif d'Oyo, Oyo

== Placement round 5–7 ==
=== Bracket ===
Cross matches
28 August 2013 – Oyo
Zambia	08
Guinea	43

5th place final
30 August 2013 – Oyo
DR Congo	28
Guinea	20
7th place final

=== 5th to 7th place matches ===
28 August 2013; 14:00	Zambia	08 – 43	Guinea	Complexe Sportif d'Oyo, Oyo
28 August 2013; 14:00		(07–19)		Complexe Sportif d'Oyo, Oyo

29 August 2013; 14:00	DR Congo	28 – 20	Guinea	Complexe Sportif d'Oyo, Oyo
29 August 2013; 14:00		(16–09)		Complexe Sportif d'Oyo, Oyo

30 August 2013; 14:00	Zambia	08 – 52	DR Congo	Complexe Sportif d'Oyo, Oyo
30 August 2013; 14:00		(06–26)		Complexe Sportif d'Oyo, Oyo

== Final round ==
=== Bracket ===
Semifinals
28 August 2013 – Oyo
Angola	38
Senegal	24
28 August 2013 – Oyo
Congo	24
Tunisia	25

Final
30 August 2013 – Oyo
Angola	29
Tunisia	18
Bronze medal match
29 August 2013 – Oyo
Senegal	18
Congo	21

=== Semifinals ===
28 August 2013; 16:00	Angola	38 – 24	Senegal	Complexe Sportif d'Oyo, Oyo
28 August 2013; 16:00		(16–15)		Complexe Sportif d'Oyo, Oyo

28 August 2013; 18:00	Congo	24 – 25	Tunisia	Complexe Sportif d'Oyo, Oyo
28 August 2013; 18:00		(10–11)		Complexe Sportif d'Oyo, Oyo

=== Bronze medal match ===
29 August 2013; 16:00	Senegal	18 – 21	Congo	Complexe Sportif d'Oyo, Oyo
29 August 2013; 16:00		(14–10)		Complexe Sportif d'Oyo, Oyo

=== Final ===
30 August 2013; 16:00	Angola	29 – 18	Tunisia	Complexe Sportif d'Oyo, Oyo
30 August 2013; 16:00		(11–08)		Complexe Sportif d'Oyo, Oyo

== Final ranking ==
Qualified for the 2014 World Youth Championship and 2014 Youth Olympics
Qualified for the 2014 World Youth Championship

Rank	Team	Record	GD
Gold medal	Angola	4–0–0	+89
Silver medal	Tunisia	2–0–2	+10
Bronze medal	Congo	4–0–1	+22
4	Senegal	1–1–3	+1
5	DR Congo	3–1–1	+60
6	Guinea	1–0–4	-8
7	Zambia	0–0–4	-163

== Awards ==
2013 Women's Youth Handball African champions

Angola
3rd title

== See also ==
- 2012 African Women's Handball Championship
- 2013 African Women's Junior Handball Championship
