= 2020 Women's Junior World Handball Championship =

Cancelled handball tournament

Tournament details
- Host country: Romania
- Venue(s): 2 (in 2 host cities)
- Teams: 24 (from 4 confederations)

The 2020 IHF Women's Junior World Championship was the cancelled 22nd edition of the IHF Women's Junior World Championship. Originally scheduled for 1 to 13 July 2020 at venues in Bucharest and Brașov, Romania, the COVID-19 pandemic resulted in its delay to 2 to 13 December 2020.

Following another delay, the tournament was cancelled on 22 February 2021.

== Qualification ==
Qualification	Host	Dates	Vacancies	Qualified
Host			1	Romania
2019 Women's U-19 European Handball Championship	(Hungary) Győr	11–21 July 2019	10	Hungary; Netherlands; Norway; Russia; Denmark; France; Spain; Germany; Croatia; Austria
2019 Asian Women's Junior Handball Championship	(Lebanon) Beirut	20–29 July 2019	4	South Korea; Japan; China; Lebanon
2019 Oceania Women's Handball Challenge Trophy	(New Caledonia) Païta	11–16 August 2019	1	Australia^{1}
2019 African Women's Junior Handball Championship	(Niger) Niamey	5–14 September 2019	3	Tunisia; Angola; Guinea
IHF Trophy – North America and Caribbean	(Canada) Montreal	15–20 October 2019	1	Mexico
IHF Trophy – Intercontinental Phase	(Colombia) Cali	13–17 October 2020	1	
2020 South and Central American Women's Junior Championship	Cancelled		3	Brazil; Chile; Paraguay

^1 Tournament won by New Caledonia who are ineligible for World Championship. Spot taken by second place Australia.

== Venues ==
Matches would have been played in Brașov, and Bucharest

- Polyvalent Hall
- Sala Sporturilor Dumitru Popescu Colibași
