= Tunisia women's national junior handball team =

Tunisia

Information
- Nickname: نسور قرطاج (Eagles of Carthage)
- Association: Tunisian Handball Federation
- Coach: Badreddine Haj Sassi

Colours
1st	2nd

Results

IHF U-20 World Championship
- Appearances: 9 (First in 2001)
- Best result: 14th (2001

African Junior Championship
- Appearances: 12 (First in 1988))
- Best result: Champions (gold) (2019)
- Last updated on Unknown.

Tunisia women's national junior handball team
Medal record

Representing Tunisia

Handball

African Junior Championship
Gold medal – first place	2019	
Silver medal – second place	1992	
Silver medal – second place	2000	
Silver medal – second place	2004	
Silver medal – second place	2009	
Silver medal – second place	2015	
Bronze medal – third place	2011	
Bronze medal – third place	2013	
Bronze medal – third place	2022	

The Tunisia women's national junior handball team is the Tunisia women's national under-19 handball team (Arabic: منتخب تونس للإناث تحت 19 سنة لكرة اليد), nicknamed Les Aigles de Carthage (The Eagles of Carthage or The Carthage Eagles), that represent Tunisia in the international handball competitions and it is Controlled by the Tunisian Handball Federation

== Tournament record ==
=== World Championship ===
Champions Runners up Third place Fourth place

- Red border color indicates tournament was held on home soil.

Tunisia in the Junior World Championship record
Year	Round	Position	GP	W	D	L	GS	GA	GD
Romania 1977	Did Not Compte								
(Socialist Federal Republic of Yugoslavia) Yugoslavia 1979	Did Not Compte								
Canada 1981	Did Not Compte								
France 1983	Did Not Compte								
South Korea 1985	Did Not Compte								
Denmark 1987	Did Not Compte								
Nigeria 1989	Did Not Compte								
France 1991	Did Not Compte								
Bulgaria 1993	Did Not Compte								
Brazil 1995	Did Not Compte								
Ivory Coast 1997	Did Not Compte								
China 1999	Did Not Compte								
Hungary 2001		14th							
(North Macedonia) Macedonia 2003	Did Not Compte								
Czech Republic 2005		19th							
(North Macedonia) Macedonia 2008	Did Not Compte								
South Korea 2010		19th							
Czech Republic 2012		23rd							
Croatia 2014		22nd							
Russia 2016		21st							
Hungary 2018	Did Not Compte								
Romania 2020	Cancelled due to the COVID-19 pandemic								
Slovenia 2022		16th							
North Macedonia 2024		24th							
(China) 2026		27th							
Total	9/24	0 Titles							

=== African Championship ===
Tunisia in the African Junior Championship record
Year	Round	Position	GP	W	D	L	GS	GA	GD
Nigeria 1980	Did not participate								
Benin 1982	Did not participate								
Nigeria 1984	Did not participate								
Algeria 1986	Did not participate								
Tunisia 1988	Semi-final	4th							
Egypt 1990	Did not participate								
Tunisia 1992	Final	2nd							
Egypt 1994	Cancelled due to insufficient number of participants								
Egypt 1996	Did not participate								
(Ivory Coast) Côte d'Ivoire 1998	Did not participate								
Tunisia 2000	Final	2nd							
Benin 2002	Semi-final	4th							
(Ivory Coast) Côte d'Ivoire 2004	Final	2nd							
(Ivory Coast) Côte d'Ivoire 2006	Did not participate								
(Ivory Coast) Côte d'Ivoire 2009	Final	2nd							
Burkina Faso 2011	Semi-final	3rd							
(Democratic Republic of the Congo) Congo 2013	Semi-final	3rd							
Kenya 2015	Final	2nd							
Ivory Coast 2017	Did not participate								
Niger 2019	Final	1st	6	6	0	0	214	121	+93
Guinea 2022	Semi-final	3rd	5	3	0	2	164	161	+3
Tunisia 2023	Semi-final	4th	6	3	3	206		143	+63
Total	12/21	1 Titles							

== See also ==
- Tunisia women's national handball team
- Tunisia women's national youth handball team
- Tunisia men's national junior handball team
