= 2011 African Women's Youth Handball Championship =

Tournament details
- Host country: Burkina Faso
- Venue(s): 1 (in 1 host city)
- Dates: August 7–13, 2011
- Teams: 6 (from 1 confederation)

Final positions
- Champions: Angola (4th title)
- Runners-up: DR Congo
- Third place: Tunisia
- Fourth place: Congo

Tournament statistics
- Matches played: 11
- Goals scored: 451 (41 per match)

The 2011 African Women's Youth Handball Championship was the 3rd edition of the tournament, organized by the African Handball Confederation, under the auspices of the International Handball Federation. The tournament was held in Ouagadougou, Burkina Faso from August 7 to 13, 2011.

Angola was the champion and the tournament qualified the top four teams to the 2012 world championship.

== Draw ==
Group A	Group B
Angola; Congo; Mali	Burkina Faso; DR Congo; Tunisia

== Preliminary round ==
6 teams were drawn into two groups of three, with the two top teams of each group playing the semifinals while the two third-placed teams played for the 5th place.

All times are local (UTC).

=== Group A ===
Qualified to the Semi-finals
Relegated to the 5-6 classification

Team	Pld	W	D	L	GF	GA	GD	Pts
Angola	2	2	0	0	64	24	+40	4
Congo	2	1	0	1	63	33	+30	2
Mali	2	0	0	2	16	86	−70	0

8 August 2011; 14:00	Angola	42 – 5	Mali	Ouagadougou
8 August 2011; 14:00		(18–3)		Ouagadougou

9 August 2011; 09:00	Congo	44 – 11	Mali	Ouagadougou
9 August 2011; 09:00		(21–6)		Ouagadougou

10 August 2011; 09:00	Angola	22 – 19	Congo	Ouagadougou
10 August 2011; 09:00		(13–11)		Ouagadougou

=== Group B ===
Qualified to the Semi-finals
Relegated to the 5-6 classification

Team	Pld	W	D	L	GF	GA	GD	Pts
DR Congo	2	2	0	0	45	28	+17	4
Tunisia	2	1	0	1	45	36	+9	2
Burkina Faso	2	0	0	2	28	54	−26	0

7 August 2011; 16:00	DR Congo	24 – 13	Burkina Faso	Ouagadougou
7 August 2011; 16:00		(13–04)		Ouagadougou

9 August 2011; 14:00	Tunisia	30 – 15	Burkina Faso	Ouagadougou
9 August 2011; 14:00		(19–07)		Ouagadougou

10 August 2011; 10:30	DR Congo	21 – 15	Tunisia	Ouagadougou
10 August 2011; 10:30		(8–10)		Ouagadougou

== Placement round 5–6 ==
11 August 2011; 15:00	Burkina Faso	30 – 12	Mali	Ouagadougou
11 August 2011; 15:00		(17–08)		Ouagadougou

== Final round ==
=== Bracket ===
Semifinals
12 August 2011 – 13:00
DR Congo	23
Congo	14
12 August 2011 – 16:30
Angola	23
Tunisia	17

Final
13 August 2011 – 15:00
Angola	19
DR Congo	16
Bronze medal match
13 August 2011 – 09:00
Tunisia	19
Congo	17

=== Semi finals ===
12 August 2011; 13:00	DR Congo	23 – 14	Congo	Ouagadougou
12 August 2011; 13:00		(9–9)		Ouagadougou

12 August 2011; 16:30	Angola	23 – 17	Tunisia	Ouagadougou
12 August 2011; 16:30		(15–11)		Ouagadougou

=== Bronze medal game ===
13 August 2011; 09:00	Tunisia	19 – 17	Congo	Ouagadougou
13 August 2011; 09:00		(8–8)		Ouagadougou

=== Final ===
13 August 2011; 15:00	Angola	19 – 16	DR Congo	Ouagadougou
13 August 2011; 15:00		(7–8)		Ouagadougou

== Final standings ==
Qualified for the 2012 World Championship

Rank	Team	Record
Gold medal	Angola	4–0
Silver medal	DR Congo	2–2
Bronze medal	Tunisia	2–2
4	Congo	2–2
5	Burkina Faso	2–1
6	Mali	1–2

== Awards ==
2011 African Women's Youth Handball Championship

Angola
2nd title

== See also ==
- 2012 African Women's Handball Championship
- 2011 African Women's Junior Handball Championship
