= Benin Handball Federation =

Governing body for handball in Benin

Benin Handball Federation French: Fédération Béninoise de Handball FBHB
- IOC nation: Republic of Benin (BEN)
- Sport: Handball
- Other sports: Beach Handball; Wheelchair Handball

AFFILIATIONS
- International federation: International Handball Federation (IHF)
- IHF member since: 1966
- Continental association: African Handball Confederation
- National Olympic Committee: Benin National Olympic and Sports Committee

GOVERNING BODY
- President: Sidikou Karimou

HEADQUARTERS
- Address: 01-BP-3833, Cotonou
- Country: Benin
- Secretary General: Calixte Adankpo

The Benin Handball Federation (FBHB; French: Fédération Béninoise de Handball) is the official administrative and controlling body for handball and beach handball in the Republic of Benin. FBHB has been a member of the African Handball Confederation (CAHB) and member of the International Handball Federation (IHF) since 1966.

== National teams ==
- Benin men's national handball team
- Benin men's national junior handball team
- Benin women's national handball team
- Benin national beach handball team
- Benin women's national beach handball team
