= 2015 African Women's Youth Handball Championship =

Tournament details
- Host country: Kenya
- Venue(s): 1 (in 1 host city)
- Dates: July 02–09 2015
- Teams: 4 (from 1 confederation)

Final positions
- Champions: Egypt (1st title)
- Runner-up: Angola
- Third place: DR Congo
- Fourth place: Kenya

Tournament statistics
- Matches played: 12
- Goals scored: 645 (53.75 per match)

The 2015 African Women's Youth Handball Championship was the 4th edition of the tournament, organized by the African Handball Confederation, under the auspices of the International Handball Federation and held in Nairobi, Kenya from July 2 to 9, 2015.

Egypt won their first title. The top three teams qualified for the 2016 world championship.

== Participating teams ==
Teams

Angola
DR Congo
Egypt
Kenya

== All matches ==
aLL teams played in a double round robin system.

All times are local (UTC+3).

Team	Pld	W	D	L	GF	GA	GD	Pts
Egypt	6	5	0	1	204	132	+72	10
Angola	6	5	0	1	210	136	+74	10
DR Congo	6	1	1	4	114	162	−48	3
Kenya	6	0	1	5	117	215	−98	1

=== Round 1 ===
2 July 2015; 15:00	DR Congo	22 – 22	Kenya	Nairobi
2 July 2015; 15:00		(10–14)		Nairobi

2 July 2015; 17:00	Angola	33 – 32	Egypt	Nairobi
2 July 2015; 17:00		(13–14)		Nairobi

=== Round 2 ===
3 July 2015; 15:00	Egypt	27 – 16	DR Congo	Nairobi
3 July 2015; 15:00		(15–07)		Nairobi

3 July 2015; 17:00	Kenya	15 – 46	Angola	Nairobi
3 July 2015; 17:00		(07–24)		Nairobi

=== Round 3 ===
4 July 2015; 15:00	Angola	30 – 14	DR Congo	Nairobi
4 July 2015; 15:00		(18–06)		Nairobi

4 July 2015; 17:00	Kenya	18 – 43	Egypt	Nairobi
4 July 2015; 17:00		(09–24)		Nairobi

=== Round 4 ===
6 July 2015; 15:00	DR Congo	16 – 36	Angola	Nairobi
6 July 2015; 15:00		(06–17)		Nairobi

6 July 2015; 17:00	Egypt	39 – 19	Kenya	Nairobi
6 July 2015; 17:00		(19–08)		Nairobi

=== Round 5 ===
7 July 2015; 15:00	DR Congo	20 – 31	Egypt	Nairobi
7 July 2015; 15:00		(08–15)		Nairobi

7 July 2015; 17:00	Kenya	27 – 39	Angola	Nairobi
7 July 2015; 17:00		(13–19)		Nairobi

=== Round 6 ===
9 July 2015; 15:00	Kenya	16 – 26	DR Congo	Nairobi
9 July 2015; 15:00		(07–10)		Nairobi

9 July 2015; 17:00	Egypt	32 – 26	Angola	Nairobi
9 July 2015; 17:00		(13–13)		Nairobi

== Final standings ==
Qualified for the 2016 World Championship

Rank	Team	Record
Gold medal	Egypt	5–1
Silver medal	Angola	5–1
Bronze medal	DR Congo	1–4
4	Kenya	0–5

== Awards ==
2015 African Women's Youth Handball Championship

Egypt
1st title

== See also ==
- 2014 African Women's Handball Championship
- 2014 African Men's Junior Handball Championship
