= Mohamed-Mzali Sports Hall =

Sports hall in Monastir, Tunisia

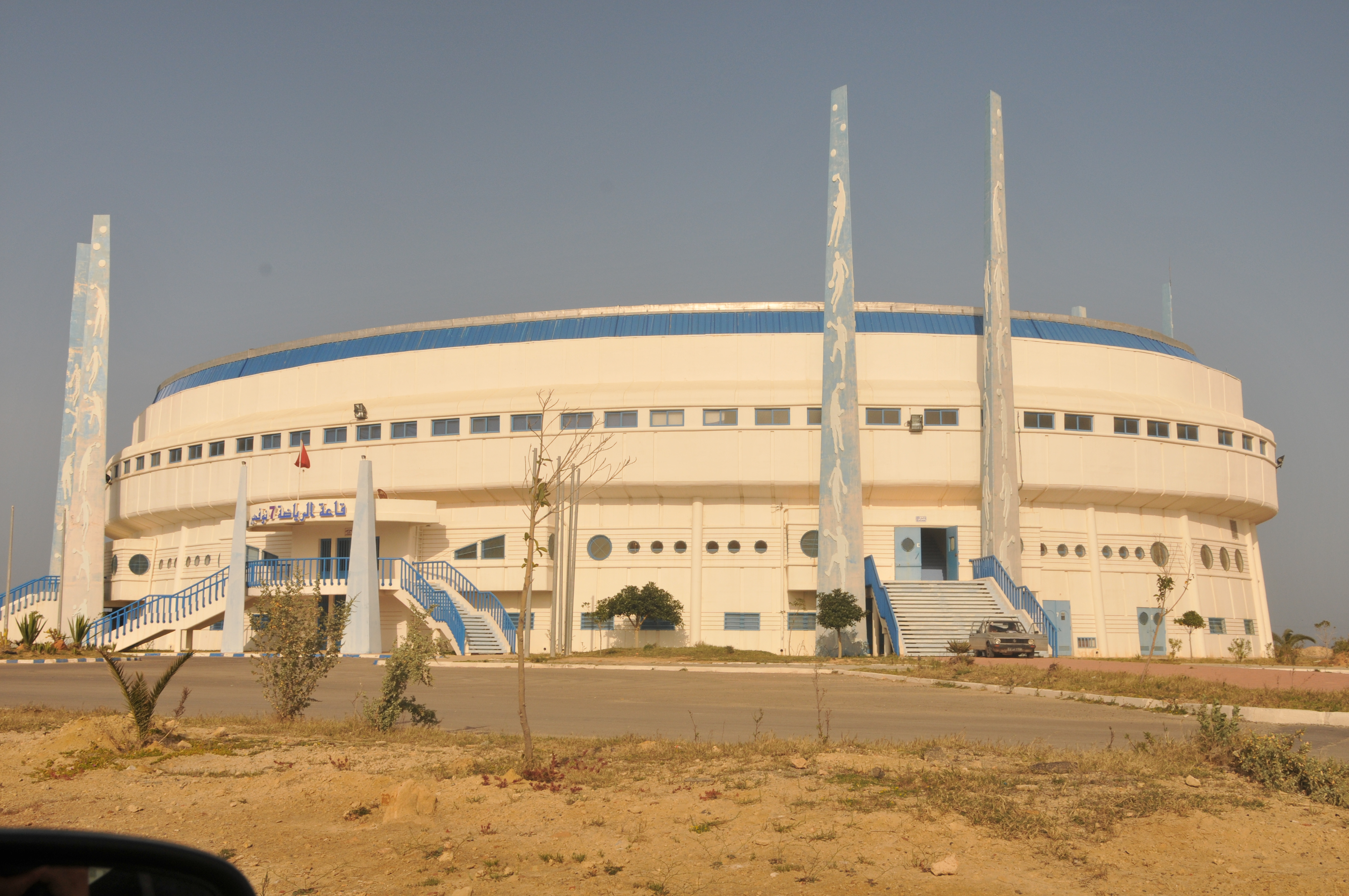
- Interactive map of Mohamed-Mzali Sports Hall
- Location: Monastir, Tunisia
- Coordinates: 35.7470°N 10.8249°E
- Capacity: 5,000
- Type: Indoor arena

Construction
- Opened: 6 April 2006

Tenant
- US Monastir (2006–present)

Mohamed-Mzali Sports Hall (in French: Salle omnisports Mohamed-Mzali), or simply Salle Mzali, is an indoor sports arena in Monastir, Tunisia. The arena is owned by the municipality of Monastir and is the home arena of basketball club US Monastir and is also occasionally used for volleyball matches.

The arena has a capacity of hosting 5,000 people. The arena was opened on 6 April 2006.

== See also ==
- List of indoor arenas in Tunisia
