= 2009 African Women's Youth Handball Championship =

Tournament details
- Host country: Ivory Coast
- Venue(s): 1 (in 1 host city)
- Dates: September 26–30, 2009
- Teams: 3 (from 1 confederation)

Final positions
- Champions: Angola (1st title)
- Runners-up: Ivory Coast
- Third place: DR Congo

Tournament statistics
- Matches played: 4
- Goals scored: 178 (44.5 per match)

The 2009 African Women's Youth Handball Championship was the 2nd edition of the tournament, organized by the African Handball Confederation, under the auspices of the International Handball Federation and held in Abidjan, Ivory Coast from September 26 to 30, 2009.

Angola was the champion and the tournament qualified the top four teams to the 2010 world championship.

== Participating teams ==
Teams

Angola
DR Congo
Ivory Coast

== Preliminary round ==
The three teams played in a round robin system with the top two playing the final.

All times are local (UTC).

| Qualified to the final |

| Team | Pld | W | D | L | GF | GA | GD | Pts |
|---|---|---|---|---|---|---|---|---|
| Angola | 2 | 2 | 0 | 0 | 53 | 34 | +19 | 4 |
| Ivory Coast | 2 | 1 | 0 | 1 | 40 | 50 | −10 | 2 |
| DR Congo | 2 | 0 | 0 | 2 | 39 | 48 | −9 | 0 |

| 26 September 2009; 11:00 | Ivory Coast | 23 – 22 | DR Congo | Abidjan |
| 26 September 2009; 11:00 | | (–) | | Abidjan |

| 27 September 2009; 11:00 | Angola | 28 – 17 | Ivory Coast | Abidjan |
| 27 September 2009; 11:00 | | (–) | | Abidjan |

| 28 September 2009; 11:00 | Angola | 25 – 17 | DR Congo | Abidjan |
| 28 September 2009; 11:00 | | (–) | | Abidjan |

=== Final ===
| 30 September 2009; 14:00 | Angola | 29 – 17 | Ivory Coast | Nairobi |
| 30 September 2009; 14:00 | | (15–08) | | Nairobi |

== Final standings ==
| Qualified for the 2010 World Championship |

| Rank | Team | Record |
|---|---|---|
| Gold medal | Angola | 3–0 |
| Silver medal | Ivory Coast | 2–1 |
| Bronze medal | DR Congo | 0–2 |

== Awards ==
2009 African Women's Youth Handball Championship

Angola
1st title

== See also ==
- 2010 African Women's Handball Championship
- 2010 African Men's Junior Handball Championship
