= Angola women's national youth handball team =

Angola

Information
- Association: Federação Angolana de Andebol
- Coach: Kátia Santos

Colours
| 1st | 2nd |

Results

Youth Olympic Games
- Appearances: 2 (First in 2010)
- Best result: 5th (2014)

IHF U-18 World Championship
- Appearances: 8 (First in 2008)
- Best result: 8th (2008)

African Youth Championship
- Appearances: 3 (First in 2009)
- Best result: (2009, 2011, 2013)
- Last updated on .

The Angola women's national handball team Under-17 represents Angola in international handball competitions and is controlled by the Federação Angolana de Andebol. At continental level, it competes at the African Women's Youth Handball Championship which qualifies for the IHF Women's Youth World Championship. Angola has been a member of the IHF since 1979.

== History ==
=== Youth Olympic Games ===
| Year | Reached | Position | GP | W | D* | L | GS | GA | GD |
|---|---|---|---|---|---|---|---|---|---|
| Singapore 2010 | Group stage | 5/6 | 4 | 2 | 0 | 2 | 125 | 95 | +30 |
| China 2014 | Group stage | 5/6 | 4 | 1 | 1 | 2 | 97 | 113 | −16 |
| Total | 2/2 | 0 Titles | 8 | 3 | 1 | 4 | 222 | 208 | +14 |

=== World Championship ===
| Year | Reached | Position | GP | W | D* | L | GS | GA | GD |
|---|---|---|---|---|---|---|---|---|---|
| Canada 2006 | Did not participate | | | | | | | | |
| Slovakia 2008 | Quarterfinals | 8/16 | 6 | 2 | 0 | 4 | 123 | 144 | −21 |
| Dominican Republic 2010 | Group stage | 10/19 | 6 | 2 | 1 | 3 | 145 | 166 | −21 |
| Montenegro 2012 | Group stage | 15/20 | 6 | 2 | 0 | 4 | 147 | 181 | −34 |
| Macedonia 2014 | Group stage | 20/24 | 7 | 1 | 0 | 6 | 170 | 182 | −12 |
| Slovakia 2016 | R16 | 10/24 | 7 | 2 | 1 | 4 | 187 | 191 | −4 |
| Poland 2018 | President's Cup | 21/24 | 7 | 2 | 1 | 4 | 148 | 155 | −7 |
| Croatia 2020 | Cancelled | | | | | | | | |
| Georgia 2022 | Did not participate | | | | | | | | |
| China 2024 | President's Cup | 26/32 | 7 | 2 | 0 | 5 | 147 | 200 | −53 |
| Romania 2026 | President's Cup | 27/32 | 7 | 2 | 0 | 5 | 159 | 209 | −50 |
| Total | 8/10 | 0 Titles | 53 | 15 | 3 | 35 | 1,079 | 1,228 | −202 |

=== African Women's Championship ===
| Year | Reached | Position | GP | W | D* | L | GS | GA | GD |
|---|---|---|---|---|---|---|---|---|---|
| Côte d'Ivoire 2000 | Did not participate | | | | | | | | |
| Côte d'Ivoire 2009 | Final | 1st | 3 | 3 | 0 | 0 | 82 | 51 | +31 |
| Burkina Faso 2011 | Final | 1st | 4 | 4 | 0 | 0 | 106 | 57 | +49 |
| Congo 2013 | Final | 1st | 4 | 4 | 0 | 0 | 147 | 58 | +89 |
| Kenya 2015 | Final | 2nd | 6 | 5 | 0 | 1 | 210 | 136 | +74 |
| Côte d'Ivoire 2017 | Final | 3rd | 6 | 4 | 1 | 1 | 162 | 135 | +27 |
| Niger 2019 | Final | 2nd | 6 | 5 | 0 | 1 | 195 | 111 | +84 |
| Total | 6/7 | 3 Titles | 29 | 25 | 1 | 3 | 902 | 548 | +354 |

== See also ==
- Angola women's national handball team
- Angola women's junior national handball team
- Angola women's youth basketball team
