= Egypt women's national junior handball team =

Egypt women's Nation youth handball team

Egypt

Information
- Nickname: The Cleopatras
- Association: Egyptian Handball Federation
- Coach: Helmy Mosabah

Colours
| 1st | 2nd |

Results

IHF U-20 World Championship
- Appearances: 5 (First in 2016)
- Best result: 13th (2024)

African Junior Championship
- Appearances: 7 (First in 1980)
- Best result: (gold) 1st (2025)
- Last updated on Unknown.

The Egypt women's national junior handball team represents Egypt in Women's Junior Handball. It is administered by the Egyptian Handball Federation.

== World Championship record ==
IHF Women's U20 Handball World Championship
| Year | Round | Position | GP | W | D | L | GS | GA | GD |
|---|---|---|---|---|---|---|---|---|---|
| 1977 Romania | Did not qualify | | | | | | | | |
| (Socialist Federal Republic of Yugoslavia) 1979 Yugoslavia | Did not qualify | | | | | | | | |
| 1981 Canada | Did not qualify | | | | | | | | |
| 1983 France | Did not qualify | | | | | | | | |
| 1985 South Korea | Did not qualify | | | | | | | | |
| 1987 Denmark | Did not qualify | | | | | | | | |
| 1989 Nigeria | Did not qualify | | | | | | | | |
| 1991 France | Did not qualify | | | | | | | | |
| 1993 Bulgaria | Did not qualify | | | | | | | | |
| 1995 Brazil | Did not qualify | | | | | | | | |
| 1997 Ivory Coast | Did not qualify | | | | | | | | |
| 1999 China | Did not qualify | | | | | | | | |
| 2001 Hungary | Did not qualify | | | | | | | | |
| 2003 North Macedonia | Did not qualify | | | | | | | | |
| 2005 Czech Republic | Did not qualify | | | | | | | | |
| 2008 North Macedonia | Did not qualify | | | | | | | | |
| 2010 South Korea | Did not qualify | | | | | | | | |
| 2012 Czech Republic | Did not qualify | | | | | | | | |
| 2014 Croatia | Did not qualify | | | | | | | | |
| 2016 Russia | Preliminary Round | 20th of 24 | 7 | 1 | 0 | 6 | 142 | 216 | -72 |
| 2018 Hungary | Preliminary Round | 23th of 24 | 6 | 0 | 0 | 6 | 111 | 221 | -110 |
| 2020 Romania | Cancelled | | | | | | | | |
| 2022 Slovenia | Main Round | 15th of 32 | 7 | 3 | 0 | 4 | 170 | 182 | -12 |
| 2024 North Macedonia | Main Round | 13th of 32 | 7 | 4 | 0 | 3 | 167 | 166 | +1 |
| 2026 China | Preliminary Round | 18th of 32 | 7 | 4 | 0 | 3 | 230 | 169 | +61 |
| Total | Qualified: 5/24 | | 34 | 12 | 0 | 23 | 820 | 954 | -124 |

== See also ==
- Egypt women's national handball team
- Egypt women's national youth handball team
