= Time in Tunisia =

- Time zone: Central European Time
- Initials: CET
- UTC offset: UTC+01:00
- Adopted: 12 April 1911

Daylight saving time
- DST not observed

tz database
- Africa/Tunis

Time in Tunisia is given by a single time zone, officially denoted as Central European Time (CET; UTC+01:00). Tunisia adopted WAT on 12 April 1911, and does not observe daylight saving time, though previously it has.

== Daylight saving time ==
Tunisia previously observed daylight saving time – advancing the clock forward one hour – between 1939 and 1945, 1977 and 1978, 1988 and 1990, and finally between 2005 and 2008. In 2005, the time zone had changed, started exceptionally in Sunday, May 1st 2005, 00:00 and ended in Friday September 30th, 02:00

== IANA time zone database ==
In the IANA time zone database, Tunisia is given one zone in the file zone.tab – Africa/Tunis. "TN" refers to the country's ISO 3166-1 alpha-2 country code. Data for Tunisia directly from zone.tab of the IANA time zone database; columns marked with * are the columns from zone.tab itself:

c.c.*	coordinates*	TZ*	Comments	UTC offset	DST
TN	+3648+01011	Africa/Tunis		+01:00	+01:00

== See also ==
- List of time zones by country
- List of UTC time offsets
