= Algeria women's national youth handball team =

Algeria

Information
- Association: Algerian Handball Federation
- Coach: Nadia Benzine

Colours
| 1st | 2nd |

Results

IHF U-18 World Championship
- Appearances: 2 (First in 2022)
- Best result: 31st (2026)
- Last updated on Unknown.

The Algeria women's youth national handball team is the national under-17 handball team of Algeria. Controlled by the Algerian Handball Federation it represents the country in international matches.

== World Championship record ==
- 2022 – 32nd place
- 2026 – 31st place
