= Guinea women's national junior handball team =

Guinea

Information
- Association: Guinean Handball Federation
- Coach: Titi Mara

Colours
1st	2nd

Results

IHF U-20 World Championship
- Appearances: 3 (First in 2022)
- Best result: 23rd (2022, 2024)
- Last updated on Unknown.

The Guinea women's junior national handball team is the national under-19 handball team of Guinea. Controlled by the Guinean Handball Federation, it represents the country in international matches.

== World Championship record ==
- 2022 – 23rd place
- 2024 – 23rd place
- 2026 – 28th place
