= Algeria women's national junior handball team =

Algeria

Information
- Association: Algerian Handball Federation
- Coach: Ait Mourad

Colours
1st	2nd

Results

IHF U-20 World Championship
- Appearances: 6 (First in 1989)
- Best result: 2th (198)
- Last updated on Unknown.

The Algeria women's junior national handball team is the national under-19 handball team of Algeria. Controlled by the Algerian Handball Federation it represents the country in international matches.

== World Championship record ==
- 1989 – 12th place
- 1993 – 16th place
- 2003 – 19th place
- 2008 – 16th place
- 2024 – 31st place
- 2026 – 24th place
