= Guinea women's national youth handball team =

Guinea

Information
- Association: Guinean Handball Federation
- Coach: Titi Mara

Colours
| 1st | 2nd |

Results

IHF U-18 World Championship
- Appearances: 3 (First in 2022)
- Best result: 25th (2026)
- Last updated on Unknown.

The Guinea women's youth national handball team is the national under-17 handball team of Guinea. Controlled by the Guinean Handball Federation it represents the country in international matches.

== World Championship record ==
- 2022 – 29th place
- 2024 – 30th place
- 2026 – 25th place
