= African Handball Confederation =

Sport controlling body

African Handball Confederation CAHB
- Sport: Handball
- Other sports: Beach handball
- Official website: cahbonline.info

History
- Year of formation: 15 January 1973; 53 years ago Lagos, Nigeria

Demographics
- Membership size: 53 Members (52 full, 1 non-active)
- International federation: International Handball Federation (IHF)
- IHF member since: 1973
- Other affiliation(s): Association of African Sports Confederations

Governance
- President: Mansourou Aremou
- Vice-President: Medhat El-Beltagy

Secretariat
- Address: 08 BP 1518 Abidjan
- Country: Côte d'Ivoire
- Secretary General: Charles Omboumahou
- Official Language(s): English & French
- Number of staff: 14

Finance
- Sponsors: Hummel; Qatar Airways

The African Handball Confederation (acronym CAHB, referring to French: Confédération Africaine de Handball) is the administrative and controlling body for African team handball. Founded on 15 January 1973 after the 2nd All-Africa Games in Lagos (Nigeria), it represents the national handball associations of Africa under the supervision of the International Handball Federation (IHF).

The CAHB headquarters is located in Abidjan, Ivory Coast. Its current president is Dr. Mansourou Aremou from Benin. The motto of the organisation is "Let's build African Handball together."

== History ==
The African Handball Confederation was the first such continental confederation and is tied to 53 national federations. It is also the continental confederation with the highest number of members within the IHF.

The founding congress took place on January 15, 1973, in Lagos, Nigeria, during the 2nd All-Africa Games. It was attended by Alberto de San Roman (Spain), the vice-president of the International Handball Federation. The committee, which had done all the preparation work, was awarded with executive functions within the confederation. Dr. Salem Nabil became president, and Babacar Fall became secretary general.

Its headquarters is in Abidjan, Ivory Coast.

Old logo

Former logo

Present logo

== CAHB presidents ==
S. No.	Name	Tenure
1	(Senegal) Babacar Fall	1973 – 1993
2	(Egypt) Nabil Salem	1993 – 1996
3	(Ivory Coast) Christophe Yapo Achy	1996 – 2008
4	(Benin) Mansourou Aremou	September 2008 – present

== CAHB secretaries general ==
S. No.	Name	Tenure
1	(Nigeria) Issa Ahmed	1973 – 1978
2	(Ivory Coast) Christophe Yapo Achy	1978 – 1993
3	(Republic of the Congo) Ferdinand Kitsadi Zorrino	1993 – 2000
4	(Benin) Mansourou Aremou	2000 – 2008
5	(Gabon) Nicole Assele	2008 – 2012
6	(Republic of the Congo) Charles Omboumahou	2012 – present

== CAHB Executive Committee ==
Designation	Name
President	(Benin) Mansourou Aremou
1st Vice-president	(Egypt) Medhat El-Beltagy
2nd Vice-president	(Angola) Pedro Godinho
Secretary General	(Republic of the Congo) Charles Omboumahou
Treasurer	(Togo) Auguste Dogbo

== CAHB Council ==
Designation	Name
President	(Benin) Mansourou Aremou
1st Vice-president	(Egypt) Medhat El-Beltagy
2nd Vice-president	(Angola) Pedro Godinho
Secretary General	(Republic of the Congo) Charles Omboumahou
Treasurer	(Togo) Auguste Dogbo
Council Members	(Ivory Coast) François Gnamian
Council Members	(Senegal) Diouf Seydou
Council Members	(Algeria) Habib Labane
President Zone 1	(Tunisia) Mourad Mestiri
President Zone 2	(Guinea) Camara Mamadouba
President Zone 3	(Burkina Faso) Alain Patrick Pare
President Zone 4	(Democratic Republic of the Congo) Amos Mbayo Kitenge
President Zone 5	(Uganda) Sheila Agonzibwa Richardson
President Zone 6	(South Africa) Ruth Saunders

== CAHB tournaments ==
Nations

- African Men's Handball Championship
- African Women's Handball Championship
- African Men's Junior Handball Championship
- African Women's Junior Handball Championship
- African Men's Youth Handball Championship
- African Women's Youth Handball Championship
- African Games

Clubs

- African Handball Champions League
- African Handball Cup Winners' Cup
- African Handball Super Cup
- African Women's Handball Champions League
- African Women's Handball Cup Winners' Cup
- African Women's Handball Super Cup

== Title holders ==
=== Nations ===
Competitions	Current Champion	Title
African Men's Handball Championship	Egypt (2026)	10th
African Women's Handball Championship	Angola (2024)	16th
African Men's Junior Handball Championship	Egypt (2024)	14th
African Women's Junior Handball Championship	Egypt (2025)	1st
African Men's Youth Handball Championship	Egypt (2024)	8th
African Women's Youth Handball Championship	Egypt (2025)	6th

=== Clubs ===
Competitions	Current Champion	Title
African Handball Champions League	(Egypt) Al Ahly (2024)	7th
African Handball Cup Winners' Cup	(Egypt) Al Ahly (2025)	5th
African Handball Super Cup	(Egypt) Al Ahly (2025)	5th
African Women's Handball Champions League	(Angola) 1º de Agosto (2023)	8th
African Women's Handball Cup Winners' Cup	(Angola) 1º de Agosto (2024)	5th
African Women's Handball Super Cup	(Angola) Petro Atlético (2025)	20th

== CAHB members ==
Africa Handball Confederation's zones

Zone 1

- Algeria
- Libya
- Morocco
- Tunisia

Zone 2

- Cape Verde
- (The Gambia) Gambia
- Guinea
- (Guinea-Bissau) Guinea Bissau
- Mali
- Mauritania
- Senegal
- Sierra Leone

Zone 3

- Benin
- Burkina Faso
- Ghana
- Ivory Coast
- Liberia
- Niger
- Nigeria
- Togo

Zone 4

- Cameroon
- Central African Republic
- Chad
- (Republic of the Congo) Congo
- (Democratic Republic of the Congo) DR Congo
- Equatorial Guinea
- Gabon
- São Tomé and Príncipe

Zone 5

- Burundi
- Djibouti
- Egypt
- Ethiopia
- Kenya
- Rwanda
- Somalia
- South Sudan
- Sudan
- Tanzania
- Uganda

Zone 6

- Angola
- Botswana
- Eswatini
- Lesotho
- Malawi
- Mozambique
- Namibia ✝
- South Africa
- Zambia
- Zimbabwe

Zone 7

- Comoros
- Madagascar
- Mauritius
- Seychelles
- ✝ means non-active member

== Summer Olympics record ==
Nation	(West Germany) 1972	(Soviet Union) 1980	(United States) 1984	(South Korea) 1988	(Spain) 1992	(United States) 1996	(Australia) 2000	(Greece) 2004	(China) 2008	(United Kingdom) 2012	(Brazil) 2016	(Japan) 2020	(France) 2024	(United States) 2028	Total
Men
Algeria		10/12	12/12	10/12		10/12									4
Egypt					11/12	6/12	7/12	12/12	10/12		9/12	4/12	5/12		8
Tunisia	16/16						10/12			8/12	12/12				4
Total	1	1	1	1	1	2	2	1	1	1	2	1	1		16
Women
Angola						7/8	9/10	9/10	12/12	10/12	8/12	10/12	9/12		8
Republic of the Congo		6/6													1
Ivory Coast				8/8											1
Nigeria					8/8										1
Total	—	1	—	1	1	1	1	1	1	1	1	1	1		11

== World Championship record ==
Men
Team	(Germany) 1938	(Sweden) 1954	(East Germany) 1958	(West Germany) 1961	(Czechoslovakia) 1964	(Sweden) 1967	(France) 1970	(East Germany) 1974	(Denmark) 1978	(West Germany) 1982	(Switzerland) 1986	(Czechoslovakia) 1990	(Sweden) 1993	(Iceland) 1995	(Japan) 1997	(Egypt) 1999	(France) 2001	(Portugal) 2003	(Tunisia) 2005	(Germany) 2007	(Croatia) 2009	(Sweden) 2011	(Spain) 2013	(Qatar) 2015	(France) 2017	(Denmark) (Germany) 2019	(Egypt) 2021	(Poland) (Sweden) 2023	(Croatia) (Denmark) (Norway) 2025	Total
Algeria								15/16		16/16	16/16	16/16		16/24	17/24	15/24	13/24	18/24	17/24		19/24	15/24	17/24	24/24			22/32	31/32	30/32	17
Angola																			20/24	21/24					24/24	23/24	30/32			5
Cape Verde																											32/32	23/32	23/32	3
DR Congo																											28/32			1
Egypt					14/16								12/16	6/24	6/24	7/24	4/24	15/24	14/24	17/24	14/24	14/24	16/24	14/24	13/24	8/24	7/32	7/32	5/32	18
Guinea																													31/32	1
Morocco														22/24	23/24	17/24	22/24	23/24		20/24							29/32	30/32		8
Nigeria																23/24														1
Tunisia						15/16								15/24	16/24	12/24	10/24	14/24	4/24	11/24	17/24	20/24	11/24	15/24	19/24	12/24	25/32	25/32	22/32	17
Total	—	—	—	—	1	1	—	1	0	1	1	1	1	4	4	5	4	4	4	4	3	3	3	3	3	3	7	5	5	71
Women
Team	—	—	(Socialist Federal Republic of Yugoslavia) 1957	(Romania) 1962	(Germany) 1965	(Netherlands) 1971	(Socialist Federal Republic of Yugoslavia) 1973	(Soviet Union) 1975	(Czechoslovakia) 1978	(Hungary) 1982	(Netherlands) 1986	(South Korea) 1990	(Norway) 1993	(Austria) 1995	(Germany) 1997	(Denmark) 1999	(Italy) 2001	(Croatia) 2003	(Russia) 2005	(France) 2007	(China) 2009	(Brazil) 2011	(Serbia) 2013	(Denmark) 2015	(Germany) 2017	(Japan) 2019	(Spain) 2021	(Denmark) (Norway) (Sweden) 2023	(Germany) (Netherlands) 2025	Total
Algeria									12/12						19/24								22/24							3
Angola												16/16	16/16	13/20	15/24	15/24	13/24	17/24	16/24	7/24	11/24	8/24	16/24	16/24	19/24	15/24	25/32	15/32	10/32	18
Cameroon																			22/24						20/24		28/32	24/32		4
Congo										12/12						22/24	22/24			17/24	20/24						23/32	26/32		7
(Democratic Republic of the Congo) DR Congo																							20/24	24/24		20/24				3
Ivory Coast														17/20	14/24	20/24		21/24	21/24		18/24	16/24								7
Egypt																													28/32	1
Senegal																										18/24		18/32	24/32	3
Tunisia								12/12									19/24	18/24		15/24	14/24	18/24	17/24	21/24	24/24		27/32		20/32	11
Total			—	—	—	—	—	1	1	1	—	1	1	2	3	3	3	3	3	3	4	3	4	3	3	3	4	4	4	53

== Sponsors ==
- Qatar Airways
