= American Samoa men's national junior handball team =

American Samoa

Information
- Association: America Samoa Handball Association
- Coach: Carl Sagapolutele Floor

Colours
| 1st | 2nd |

Results

IHF U-21 World Championship
- Appearances: None

Oceania Handball Challenge Trophy
- Appearances: 1 (First in 2014)
- Best result: 8th
- Last updated on 28 October 2016.

The American Samoa national junior handball team is the national men's junior handball team of American Samoa.Controlled by the American Samoa Handball Federation it represents American Samoa in international matches.

== Oceania Nations Cup record ==
=== Competitive record at the Oceania Nations Cup ===
| Year | Round | Position |
|---|---|---|
| (Australia) 1998 | Did not Enter | |
| (Australia) 2010 | Did not Enter | |
| (Samoa) 2012 | Did not Enter | |
| (New Zealand) 2014 | Group Stage | 8th |
| (Cook Islands) 2017 | Did not Enter | |
| (New Caledonia) 2018 | Did not Enter | |
| (Cook Islands) 2022 | Did not Enter | |
| (French Polynesia) 2024 | Did not Enter | |
