= IHF Inter-Continental Trophy =

Award granted by the International Handball Federation

- Current season, competition or edition: 2023 IHF Inter-Continental Trophy
- Sport: Handball
- Founded: 2011
- First season: 2011
- Countries: 6
- Confederation: 6
- Most recent champions: Men's Junior; United States; Men's Youth; Kosovo; Women's Junior; Guinea; Women's Youth; Guinea
- Website: IHF.info

The IHF Inter-Continental Trophy has been organized by the International Handball Federation since 2011. It is a biennial tournament played among emerging nations in under-21 (junior) and under-19 (youth) categories.

== Men's junior tournament ==
=== Summary ===
Year	Host	Final			Third place match		
Year	Host	Champion	Score	Runner-up	Third place	Score	Fourth place
2011; Details	(India); Jaipur	Finland	No playoffs	Venezuela	Benin	No playoffs	India
2013; Details	(Mexico); Monterrey	Moldova	No playoffs	Mexico	Nigeria	No playoffs	Uzbekistan
2015; Details	(Bulgaria); Gabrovo	Faroe Islands	No playoffs	Cape Verde	Colombia	No playoffs	Uzbekistan
2019; Details	(Kosovo); Pristina	Kosovo	30–26	Chinese Taipei	United States	36–34 (OT)	Paraguay
2023; Details	(Costa Rica); San José	Cuba	No playoffs	Guinea	Great Britain	No playoffs	Costa Rica
2025; Details	(Kosovo); Pristina	United States	33–32	Uzbekistan	Rwanda	48–31	Bulgaria

=== Medal table ===
Rank	Nation	Gold	Silver	Bronze	Total
1	United States	1	0	1	2
2	Cuba	1	0	0	1
2	Faroe Islands	1	0	0	1
2	Finland	1	0	0	1
2	Kosovo	1	0	0	1
2	Moldova	1	0	0	1
7	Cape Verde	0	1	0	1
7	Chinese Taipei	0	1	0	1
7	Guinea	0	1	0	1
7	Mexico	0	1	0	1
7	Uzbekistan	0	1	0	1
7	Venezuela	0	1	0	1
13	Benin	0	0	1	1
13	Colombia	0	0	1	1
13	Great Britain	0	0	1	1
13	Nigeria	0	0	1	1
13	Rwanda	0	0	1	1
Totals (17 entries)		6	6	6	18

=== Participating nations ===
Nation	(India) 2011	(Mexico) 2013	(Bulgaria) 2015	(Kosovo) 2019	(Costa Rica) 2023	(Kosovo) 2025	Years
Australia	5th	5th		6th	5th		4
Benin	3rd						1
Bulgaria						4th	1
Cape Verde			2nd				1
Chinese Taipei				2nd			1
Colombia			3rd				1
Costa Rica					4th		1
Cuba					1st		1
Faroe Islands			1st				1
Finland	1st						1
Great Britain					3rd		1
Guinea					2nd		1
India	4th						1
Kosovo				1st			1
Mexico		2nd					1
Moldova		1st					1
New Caledonia						6th	1
Nicaragua						5th	1
Nigeria		3rd		5th			2
Paraguay				4th			1
Rwanda						3rd	1
Tahiti			5th				1
United States				3rd		1st	2
Uzbekistan		5th	4th			2nd	3
Venezuela	2nd						1
Total	5	5	5	6	5	6	

== Men's youth tournament ==
=== Summary ===
Year	Host	Final			Third place match		
Year	Host	Champion	Score	Runner-up	Third place	Score	Fourth place
2019; Details	(Kosovo); Pristina	Chinese Taipei	27–26	Nigeria	Kosovo	32–26	Canada
2023; Details	(Costa Rica); San José	Guadeloupe	No playoffs	Georgia	Nigeria	No playoffs	Nicaragua
2025; Details	(Kosovo); Pristina	Kosovo	34–30 (OT)	Nigeria	United States	38–36	Uzbekistan

=== Participating nations ===
Nation	(Kosovo) 2019	(Costa Rica) 2023	(Kosovo) 2025	Years
Canada	4th			1
Chinese Taipei	1st			1
Georgia		2nd		1
Guadeloupe		1st		1
Kosovo	3rd		1st	2
New Caledonia			6th	1
New Zealand	6th			1
Nicaragua		4th	5th	2
Nigeria	2nd	3rd	2nd	3
Paraguay	5th			1
Tahiti		5th		1
United States			3rd	1
Uzbekistan			4th	1
Total	6	5	6	

== Women's junior tournament ==
=== Summary ===
Year	Host	Final			Third place match		
Year	Host	Champion	Score	Runner-up	Third place	Score	Fourth place
2011; Details	(Kazakhstan); Almaty	Finland	No playoffs	Kazakhstan	Congo	No playoffs	Cuba
2013; Details	(Mexico); Monterrey	Bulgaria	No playoffs	DR Congo	Canada	No playoffs	Thailand
2015; Details	(Bulgaria); Gabrovo	Guadeloupe	No playoffs	Bulgaria	Uzbekistan	No playoffs	Senegal
2024; Details	(Uzbekistan); Tashkent	Uzbekistan	33–23	Great Britain	Guinea	27–17	Mexico
2026; Details	(Bulgaria); Veliko Tarnovo	Guinea	No playoffs	Bulgaria	Canada	No playoffs	Uzbekistan

=== Medal table ===
Rank	Nation	Gold	Silver	Bronze	Total
1	Bulgaria	1	2	0	3
2	Guinea	1	0	1	2
2	Uzbekistan	1	0	1	2
4	Finland	1	0	0	1
4	Guadeloupe	1	0	0	1
6	DR Congo	0	1	0	1
6	Great Britain	0	1	0	1
6	Kazakhstan	0	1	0	1
9	Canada	0	0	2	2
10	Congo	0	0	1	1
Totals (10 entries)		5	5	5	15

=== Participating nations ===
Nation	(Kazakhstan) 2011	(Mexico) 2013	(Bulgaria) 2015	(Uzbekistan) 2024	(Bulgaria) 2026	Years
Australia		5th				1
Bulgaria		1st	2nd		2nd	3
Canada		3rd			3rd	2
Colombia					5th	1
Congo	3rd					1
Cuba	4th					1
DR Congo		2nd				1
Finland	1st					1
Great Britain				2nd		1
Guadeloupe			1st			1
Guinea				3rd	1st	2
Kazakhstan	2nd					1
Mexico				4th		1
New Caledonia				5th		1
New Zealand			5th			1
Peru				6th		1
Senegal			4th			1
Thailand		4th				1
Uzbekistan			3rd	1st	4th	3
Total	4	5	5	6	5	

== Women's youth tournament ==
=== Summary ===
Year	Host	Final			Third place match		
Year	Host	Champion	Score	Runner-up	Third place	Score	Fourth place
2024; Details	(Uzbekistan); Tashkent	Kosovo	22–16	Nigeria	Uzbekistan	24–18	New Caledonia
2026; Details	(Bulgaria); Veliko Tarnovo	Guinea	No playoffs	Bulgaria	Uzbekistan	No playoffs	Canada

=== Medal table ===
Rank	Nation	Gold	Silver	Bronze	Total
1	Guinea	1	0	0	1
1	Kosovo	1	0	0	1
3	Bulgaria	0	1	0	1
3	Nigeria	0	1	0	1
5	Uzbekistan	0	0	2	2
Totals (5 entries)		2	2	2	6

=== Participating nations ===
Nation	(Uzbekistan) 2024	(Bulgaria) 2026	Years
Bulgaria		2nd	1
Canada		3rd	1
Guadeloupe	5th		1
Guatemala	6th		1
Guinea		1st	1
Kosovo	1st		1
New Caledonia	4th		1
Nigeria	2nd		1
Uzbekistan	3rd	4th	2
Venezuela		5th	1
Total	6	5	
