= Australia national handball team (disambiguation) =

Australia national handball team may refer to:

== Men's teams ==
- Australia men's national handball team
- Australia men's national junior handball team
- Australia men's national youth handball team

== Women's teams ==
- Australia women's national handball team
- Australia women's national junior handball team
- Australia women's national youth handball team
