= 2022 Oceania Youth Handball Championship =

The 2022 Men's Oceania Youth Handball Championship was held at Rarotonga, Cook Islands between 5 and 9 December 2022.

This is the fifth ever championship. The competition participants were defending champions New Zealand, the hosts Cook Islands, Australia, Tahiti New Caledonia and Tonga.

Tahiti won their second title in the round robin event. Hosts New Caledonia were third followed by New Zealand, the Cook Islands and Tonga. The Under-18 competition was won by Tahiti.

Oceania was not granted a spot in the 2023 Men's Youth World Handball Championship, but Tahiti have qualified for the IHF Inter-Continental Trophy.

== Results ==
Team	Pld	W	D	L	GF	GA	GD	Pts
French Polynesia	5	5	0	0	0	0	0	10
New Zealand	5	3	0	2	0	0	0	6
New Caledonia	5	4	0	1	0	0	0	8
Australia	5	2	0	3	0	0	0	4
Cook Islands	5	1	0	4	0	0	0	2
Tonga	5	0	0	5	0	0	0	0

Source: Report

5 December 2022; 10:00	Australia	10 - 29	New Zealand

14:00	New Caledonia	29 - 38	French Polynesia

16:00	Cook Islands	21 - 15	Tonga

6 December 2022; 10:00	French Polynesia	34 - 9	Australia

14:00	Tonga	14 - 38	New Caledonia

16:00	New Zealand	47 - 12	Cook Islands

7 December 2022; 10:00	Tonga	25 - 32	Australia

14:00	French Polynesia	28 - 27	New Zealand

16:00	Cook Islands	17 - 42	New Caledonia

8 December 2022; 10:00	Tonga	16 - 30	New Zealand

14:00	New Caledonia	34 - 24	Australia

16:00	French Polynesia	47 - 19	Cook Islands

9 December 2022; 12:00	New Caledonia	17 - 27	New Zealand

14:00	French Polynesia	57 - 20	Tonga

16:00	Australia	23 - 16	Cook Islands

== Rankings ==
Classification
1st place, gold medalist(s)	French Polynesia
2nd place, silver medalist(s)	New Zealand
3rd place, bronze medalist(s)	New Caledonia
4	Australia
5	Cook Islands
6	Tonga
