= Vanuatu men's national junior handball team =

Handball team

Vanuatu

Information
- Association: Vanuatu Handball Association

Colours
1st	2nd

Results

IHF U-21 World Championship
- Appearances: None

Oceania Handball Challenge Trophy
- Appearances: 3 (First in 2010)
- Best result: 3rd twice
- Last updated on 14 January 2016.

The Vanuatu national junior handball team is the national junior men's handball team of Vanuatu.

== Oceania Handball Challenge Trophy record ==
Year	Position
Sydney 1998	did not enter
Brisbane 2010	3rd
Apia 2012	3rd
Wellington 2014	5th
Rarotonga 2017	did not enter
New Caledonia 2018	did not enter
Total	3/6
