= French Polynesia men's national junior handball team =

National junior handball team

French Polynesia

Information
- Association: Federation Tahitienne de Handball

Colours
1st	2nd

Results

IHF U-21 World Championship
- Appearances: None

Oceania Handball Challenge Trophy
- Appearances: 2 (First in 2014)
- Best result: 1st (twice)
- Last updated on 9 August 2017.

The French Polynesia national junior handball team is the national men's junior handball team of French Polynesia. They won the Oceania Handball Challenge Trophy in Wellington at their first attempt.

== Oceania Handball Challenge Trophy ==
Year	Position
Sydney 1998	did not enter
Brisbane 2010	did not enter
Apia 2012	did not enter
Wellington 2014	1st
Rarotonga 2017	1st
New Caledonia 2018	2nd
Total	2/5

== IHF Inter-Continental Trophy ==
Year	Position
Gabrovo 2015	5th
Gothenburg 2018	5th
Total	2/4
