= Time in Serbia =

- Time zone: Central European Time
- Initials: CET
- UTC offset: UTC+01:00
- Time notation: 24-hour clock
- Adopted: 1884

Daylight saving time
- Name: Central European Summer Time
- Initials: CEST
- UTC offset: UTC+02:00
- Start: Last Sunday in March (02:00 CET)
- End: Last Sunday in October (03:00 CEST)

tz database
- Europe/Belgrade

In Serbia, the standard time is Central European Time (CET; UTC+01:00; Serbian: средњоевропско време, romanized: srednjoevropsko vreme). Daylight saving time is observed from the last Sunday in March (02:00 CET) to the last Sunday in October (03:00 CEST). Serbia adopted CET in 1884.

== Time notation ==
The 24-hour clock is almost exclusively used in writing, while spoken language is dominated by the 12-hour clock, usually without noting whether the hour is a.m. or p.m. – that information is derived from the context.

== IANA time zone database ==
In the IANA time zone database, Serbia is given the zone Europe/Belgrade.

c.c.*	coordinates*	TZ*	Comments	UTC offset	DST
RS	+4450+02030	Europe/Belgrade		+01:00	+02:00

== See also ==
- Time in Europe
- Time in Kosovo
- Time in Albania
- Time in Bosnia and Herzegovina
