= Time in Montenegro =

- Time zone: Central European Time
- Initials: CET
- UTC offset: UTC+02:00
- Time notation: 24-hour clock

Daylight saving time
- Name: Central European Summer Time
- Initials: CEST
- UTC offset: UTC+02:00
- Start: Last Sunday in March (02:00 CET)
- End: Last Sunday in October (03:00 CEST)
- In use since: 2006

tz database
- Europe/Podgorica

In Montenegro, the standard time is Central European Time (CET; UTC+01:00). Daylight saving time is observed from the last Sunday in March (02:00 CET) to the last Sunday in October (03:00 CEST). Montenegro has consistently used CET since it gained independence in 2006.

== Time notation ==
Montenegrins use the 24-hour clock.

== IANA time zone database ==
In the IANA time zone database, Montenegro is given the zone Europe/Podgorica.

c.c.*	coordinates*	TZ*	Comments	UTC offset	DST
ME	+4226+01916	Europe/Podgorica		+01:00	+02:00

== See also ==
- Time in Europe
- Time in Albania
- Time in Bosnia and Herzegovina
