= 2023 Oceania Women's Handball Challenge Trophy =

The 2023 Women's Oceania Handball Challenge Trophy was held in New Caledonia from 16 to 21 October 2023. The competition participants were host New Caledonia, Australia, New Zealand, Cook Islands and Tahiti. Tonga were scheduled to enter, but did not arrive.

Hosts New Caledonia won their second championship from Tahiti. New Zealand were third with Australia fourth and Cook Islands fifth.

New Caledonia now qualify for the IHF Inter-Continental Trophy.

== Results ==
Team	Pld	W	D	L	GF	GA	GD	Pts
New Caledonia	4	4	0	0	102	60	+42	8
French Polynesia	4	3	0	1	86	56	+30	6
New Zealand	4	2	0	2	60	68	−8	4
Australia	4	1	0	3	56	74	−18	2
Cook Islands	4	0	0	4	42	88	−46	0
Tonga	0	0	0	0	0	0	0	0

16 October 2023; 16:00	New Zealand	19–15	Australia	L'Arène du Sud, Païta, New Caledonia
16 October 2023; 16:00		(6–3)		L'Arène du Sud, Païta, New Caledonia
16 October 2023; 16:00		Report		L'Arène du Sud, Païta, New Caledonia

20:00	New Caledonia	38–10	Cook Islands	L'Arène du Sud, Païta, New Caledonia
20:00		(17–6)		L'Arène du Sud, Païta, New Caledonia
20:00		Report		L'Arène du Sud, Païta, New Caledonia

17 October 2023; 16:00	Cook Islands	15–20	Australia	L'Arène du Sud, Païta, New Caledonia
17 October 2023; 16:00		(8–10)		L'Arène du Sud, Païta, New Caledonia
17 October 2023; 16:00		Report		L'Arène du Sud, Païta, New Caledonia

20:00	New Zealand	15–21	French Polynesia	L'Arène du Sud, Païta, New Caledonia
20:00		(11–13)		L'Arène du Sud, Païta, New Caledonia
20:00		Report		L'Arène du Sud, Païta, New Caledonia

18 October 2023; 16:00	Cook Islands	6–12	New Zealand	L'Arène du Sud, Païta, New Caledonia
18 October 2023; 16:00		(4–6)		L'Arène du Sud, Païta, New Caledonia
18 October 2023; 16:00		Report		L'Arène du Sud, Païta, New Caledonia

20:00	French Polynesia	22–23	New Caledonia	L'Arène du Sud, Païta, New Caledonia
20:00		(12–9)		L'Arène du Sud, Païta, New Caledonia
20:00		Report		L'Arène du Sud, Païta, New Caledonia

19 October 2023; 16:00	French Polynesia	18–11	Cook Islands	L'Arène du Sud, Païta, New Caledonia
19 October 2023; 16:00		(5–5)		L'Arène du Sud, Païta, New Caledonia
19 October 2023; 16:00		Report		L'Arène du Sud, Païta, New Caledonia

20:00	New Caledonia	15–14	Australia	L'Arène du Sud, Païta, New Caledonia
20:00		(7–5)		L'Arène du Sud, Païta, New Caledonia
20:00		Report		L'Arène du Sud, Païta, New Caledonia

20 October 2023; 13:00	Australia	7–25	French Polynesia	L'Arène du Sud, Païta, New Caledonia
20 October 2023; 13:00		(6–12)		L'Arène du Sud, Païta, New Caledonia

17:00	New Zealand	14–29	New Caledonia	L'Arène du Sud, Païta, New Caledonia
17:00		(10–13)		L'Arène du Sud, Païta, New Caledonia
17:00		Report		L'Arène du Sud, Païta, New Caledonia

=== French Pacific Championship ===
18 October 2023; 20:00	New Caledonia	23–22	French Polynesia	L'Arène du Sud, Païta, New Caledonia
18 October 2023; 20:00		(9–12)		L'Arène du Sud, Païta, New Caledonia
18 October 2023; 20:00		Report		L'Arène du Sud, Païta, New Caledonia

== Rankings ==
Classification
1st place, gold medalist(s)	New Caledonia
2nd place, silver medalist(s)	French Polynesia
3rd place, bronze medalist(s)	New Zealand
4	Australia
5	Cook Islands
–	Tonga
