= 2018 Oceania Men's Handball Challenge Trophy =

International handball competition

The 2018 Men's Oceania Handball Challenge Trophy is to be held at the L'Arene du Sud, New Caledonia between 10 and 15 June 2018.

This is the sixth ever championship. The competition participants were defending champions Tahiti, Australia, Cook Islands, New Zealand, hosts New Caledonia and Fiji.

Australia won their fourth title beating defending champions Tahiti. Hosts New Caledonia were third followed by New Zealand, Fiji and the Cook Islands.

== Results ==
| Team | Pld | W | D | L | GF | GA | GD | Pts |
|---|---|---|---|---|---|---|---|---|
| Australia | 5 | 5 | 0 | 0 | 133 | 94 | +39 | 10 |
| French Polynesia | 5 | 4 | 0 | 1 | 185 | 113 | +72 | 8 |
| New Caledonia | 5 | 3 | 0 | 2 | 183 | 113 | +70 | 6 |
| New Zealand | 5 | 2 | 0 | 3 | 112 | 120 | −8 | 4 |
| Fiji | 5 | 1 | 0 | 4 | 113 | 172 | −59 | 2 |
| Cook Islands | 5 | 0 | 0 | 5 | 54 | 168 | −114 | 0 |

| 10 June, 2018; 20:00 | New Caledonia | 49 - 21 | Fiji | L'Arene du Sud, New Caledonia |

| 11 June 2018; 16:00 | New Zealand | 21 - 36 | New Caledonia | L'Arene du Sud, New Caledonia |

| 18:00 | Cook Islands | 19 - 35 | Fiji | L'Arene du Sud, New Caledonia |

| 20:00 | French Polynesia | 26 - 28 | Australia | L'Arene du Sud, New Caledonia |

| 12 June 2018; 16:00 | New Caledonia | 24 - 28 | Australia | L'Arene du Sud, New Caledonia |

| 18:00 | Fiji | 18 - 27 | New Zealand | L'Arene du Sud, New Caledonia |

| 20:00 | French Polynesia | 44 - 6 | Cook Islands | L'Arene du Sud, New Caledonia |

| 13 June 2018; 16:00 | Cook Islands | 5 - 42 | New Caledonia | L'Arene du Sud, New Caledonia |

| 18:00 | Australia | 22 - 16 | New Zealand | L'Arene du Sud, New Caledonia |
| 18:00 | | (8-12) | | L'Arene du Sud, New Caledonia |

| 20:00 | Fiji | 21 - 47 | French Polynesia | L'Arene du Sud, New Caledonia |
| 20:00 | | (13 - 23) | | L'Arene du Sud, New Caledonia |

| 14 June 2018; 16:00 | Cook Islands | 14 - 22 | New Zealand | L'Arene du Sud, New Caledonia |

| 18:00 | Australia | 30 - 18 | Fiji | L'Arene du Sud, New Caledonia |

| 20:00 | French Polynesia | 38 - 32 | New Caledonia | L'Arene du Sud, New Caledonia |

| 15 June 2018; 16:00 | New Zealand | 26 - 30 | French Polynesia | L'Arene du Sud, New Caledonia |

| 18:00 | Australia | 25 - 10 | Cook Islands | L'Arene du Sud, New Caledonia |

== Rankings ==
Classification
| 1st place, gold medalist(s) | Australia |
| 2nd place, silver medalist(s) | French Polynesia |
| 3rd place, bronze medalist(s) | New Caledonia |
| 4 | New Zealand |
| 5 | Fiji |
| 6 | Cook Islands |
