= 2025 IHF Trophy U19 – Oceania =

Women's Junior Handball Championship qualifier

2025 IHF Trophy U17 – Oceania
Tournament details
- Host country: Cook Islands
- Venue: 1 (in 1 host city)
- Dates: 13–17 October
- Teams: 5 (from 1 confederation)

Final positions
- Champions: New Caledonia
- Runners-up: Australia
- Third place: Tahiti
- Fourth place: New Zealand

Tournament statistics
- Matches played: 11

The 2025 IHF Trophy U17 – Oceania took place in Rarotonga, Cook Islands, from 13 to 17 October 2025. It acted as the Oceanian qualifying tournament for the 2026 IHF Women's U20 Handball World Championship and 2026 IHF Inter-Continental Trophy.

New Caledonia won the championship after beating Australia 30–26 in the final. As New Caledonia is not a full member of the IHF, Australia was given the World Championship spot. However Australia withdrew from the World Championship shortly after.

== Teams ==
- Australia
- Cook Islands
- Fiji
- New Caledonia
- New Zealand
- Tahiti

== Group stage ==
All times are local.

=== Group A ===
Pos	Team	Pld	W	D	L	GF	GA	GD	Pts	Qualification
1	New Caledonia	2	2	0	0	63	37	+26	4	Semifinals
2	Australia	2	1	0	1	54	48	+6	2	Semifinals
3	Cook Islands (H)	2	0	0	2	24	56	−32	0	

Source: 2025 IHF Trophy U19 – Oceania
Rules for classification: 1) Points; 2) Head-to-head points; 3) Head-to-head goal difference; 4) Head-to-head goals scored; 5) Goal difference; 6) Goals scored; 7) Draw.
(H) Hosts

13 October 2025; 17:00	Cook Islands	11–28	New Caledonia	Telecom Sport Arena, Rarotonga
13 October 2025; 17:00		(4–13)		Telecom Sport Arena, Rarotonga
13 October 2025; 17:00		Report		Telecom Sport Arena, Rarotonga

14 October 2025; 17:00	Australia	28–13	Cook Islands	Telecom Sport Arena, Rarotonga
14 October 2025; 17:00		(17–5)		Telecom Sport Arena, Rarotonga
14 October 2025; 17:00		Report		Telecom Sport Arena, Rarotonga

15 October 2025; 17:00	Australia	26–35	New Caledonia	Telecom Sport Arena, Rarotonga
15 October 2025; 17:00		(12–14)		Telecom Sport Arena, Rarotonga
15 October 2025; 17:00		Report		Telecom Sport Arena, Rarotonga

=== Group B ===
Pos	Team	Pld	W	D	L	GF	GA	GD	Pts	Qualification
1	Tahiti	2	2	0	0	58	25	+33	4	Semifinals
2	New Zealand	2	1	0	1	29	36	−7	2	Semifinals
3	Fiji	2	0	0	2	24	50	−26	0	

Source: 2025 IHF Trophy U19 – Oceania
Rules for classification: 1) Points; 2) Head-to-head points; 3) Head-to-head goal difference; 4) Head-to-head goals scored; 5) Goal difference; 6) Goals scored; 7) Draw.

13 October 2025; 15:00	Fiji	13–33	Tahiti	Telecom Sport Arena, Rarotonga
13 October 2025; 15:00		(5–13)		Telecom Sport Arena, Rarotonga
13 October 2025; 15:00		Report		Telecom Sport Arena, Rarotonga

14 October 2025; 15:00	New Zealand	17–11	Fiji	Telecom Sport Arena, Rarotonga
14 October 2025; 15:00		(6–6)		Telecom Sport Arena, Rarotonga
14 October 2025; 15:00		Report		Telecom Sport Arena, Rarotonga

15 October 2025; 15:00	Tahiti	25–12	New Zealand	Telecom Sport Arena, Rarotonga
15 October 2025; 15:00		(13–6)		Telecom Sport Arena, Rarotonga
15 October 2025; 15:00		Report		Telecom Sport Arena, Rarotonga

== Knockout stage ==
=== Fifth place game ===
16 October 2025; 15:00	Cook Islands	19–27	Fiji	Telecom Sport Arena, Rarotonga
16 October 2025; 15:00		(2–13)		Telecom Sport Arena, Rarotonga
16 October 2025; 15:00		Report		Telecom Sport Arena, Rarotonga

=== Bracket ===
Semi-finals
16 October
New Caledonia	34
New Zealand	4
16 October
Tahiti	29
Australia	31

Final
17 October
New Caledonia	30
Australia	26
Third place
17 October
New Zealand	12
Tahiti	25

=== Semifinals ===
16 October 2025; 17:00	New Caledonia	34–4	New Zealand	Telecom Sport Arena, Rarotonga
16 October 2025; 17:00		(24–3)		Telecom Sport Arena, Rarotonga
16 October 2025; 17:00		Report		Telecom Sport Arena, Rarotonga

16 October 2025; 19:00	Australia	31–29	Tahiti	Telecom Sport Arena, Rarotonga
16 October 2025; 19:00		(17–17)		Telecom Sport Arena, Rarotonga
16 October 2025; 19:00		Report		Telecom Sport Arena, Rarotonga

=== Third place game ===
17 October 2025; 19:00	New Zealand	12–25	Tahiti	Telecom Sport Arena, Rarotonga
17 October 2025; 19:00		Report		Telecom Sport Arena, Rarotonga

=== Final ===
17 October 2025; 17:00	New Caledonia	30–26	Australia	Telecom Sport Arena, Rarotonga
17 October 2025; 17:00		(13–14)		Telecom Sport Arena, Rarotonga
17 October 2025; 17:00		Report		Telecom Sport Arena, Rarotonga

== See also ==
- 2026 IHF Women's U20 Handball World Championship
- 2026 IHF Inter-Continental Trophy
