= 2012 Oceania Women's Handball Challenge Trophy =

The 2012 Women's Oceania Handball Challenge Trophy was held in Apia, Samoa between October 1 and 6, 2012.

The competition participants were defending champions Australia, New Zealand, Vanuatu and Cook Islands and hosts Samoa.

The winners were Australia, going through undefeated. Second was New Zealand then Vanuatu, Cook Islands and Samoa.

== Results ==
=== Group stage ===
Team	Pld	W	D	L	GF	GA	GD	Pts
Australia	4	4	0	0	113	42	+71	8
New Zealand	4	3	0	1	94	61	+33	6
Vanuatu	4	2	0	2	87	76	+11	4
Cook Islands	4	1	0	3	58	101	−43	2
Samoa	4	0	0	4	29	101	−72	0

1 October 2012	Australia	26 – 11	Vanuatu	Apia, Samoa

Samoa	6 – 12	Cook Islands	Apia, Samoa

2 October 2012	Australia	34 – 6	Samoa	Apia, Samoa

New Zealand	23 – 19	Vanuatu	Apia, Samoa

3 October 2012	New Zealand	28 – 14	Cook Islands	Apia, Samoa

Samoa	25 – 7	Vanuatu	Apia, Samoa

4 October 2012	New Zealand	30 – 10	Samoa	Apia, Samoa

Cook Islands	12 – 35	Australia	Apia, Samoa

5 October 2012	Cook Islands	20 – 32	Vanuatu	Apia, Samoa

New Zealand	13 – 18	Australia	Apia, Samoa

=== Final ===
6 October 2012	Australia	22 – 15	New Zealand	Apia, Samoa

== Rankings ==
Classification
1st place, gold medalist(s)	Australia
2nd place, silver medalist(s)	New Zealand
3rd place, bronze medalist(s)	Vanuatu
4	Cook Islands
5	Samoa
