= 2026 IHF Inter-Continental Trophy =

2025/2026 Women's IHF Trophy – Intercontinental Phase
Tournament details
- Host country: Bulgaria
- Venue: 1 (in 1 host city)
- Dates: 7–11 April

The 2026 IHF Inter-Continental Trophy was held in Veliko Tarnovo, Bulgaria from 7 to 11 April 2026. It featured a women's youth (U17) tournament and a women's junior (U19) tournament.

== Junior tournament ==
=== Qualification ===
Confederation	Dates	Host	Vacancies	Qualified
North America & the Caribbean (NACHC)	16–20 July 2025	(Canada) Drummondville	1	Canada
Africa (CAHB)	6–13 September 2025	(Algeria) Oran	1	Guinea
Oceania (OCHF)	13–17 October 2025	(Cook Islands) Avarua	~~1~~	~~New Caledonia~~
Asia (AHF)	24–28 November 2025	(Thailand) Suphan Buri	1	Uzbekistan
Europe (EHF)	2–6 December 2025	(Kosovo) Pristina	1	Bulgaria
South and Central America (SCAHC)	12–16 January 2026	(Paraguay) Asunción	1	Colombia

=== Standings ===
Pos	Team	Pld	W	D	L	GF	GA	GD	Pts
1	Guinea	4	4	0	0	148	105	+43	8
2	Bulgaria (H)	4	2	1	1	121	125	−4	5
3	Canada	4	2	0	2	129	137	−8	4
4	Uzbekistan	4	1	1	2	145	140	+5	3
5	Colombia	4	0	0	4	118	154	−36	0

Source: IHF
Rules for classification: 1) points; 2) head-to-head points; 3) head-to-head goal difference; 4) head-to-head number of goals scored; 5) goal difference.
(H) Hosts

=== Results ===
All times are local (UTC+3).

7 April 2026; 14:45	Canada	39–31	Uzbekistan	Palace of Culture and Sports Vasil Levski, Veliko Tarnovo; Attendance: 150; Referees: Dáné, Marton (HUN)
7 April 2026; 14:45	Lemaire 16	(22–14)	Tokhirova, Uzokboeva 6	Palace of Culture and Sports Vasil Levski, Veliko Tarnovo; Attendance: 150; Referees: Dáné, Marton (HUN)
7 April 2026; 14:45	8× (suspension) 1× (red card)	Report	2× (suspension)	Palace of Culture and Sports Vasil Levski, Veliko Tarnovo; Attendance: 150; Referees: Dáné, Marton (HUN)

7 April 2026; 19:15	Colombia	31–37	Bulgaria	Palace of Culture and Sports Vasil Levski, Veliko Tarnovo; Attendance: 350; Referees: Bohoiavlenska, Molina-Hidalgo (USA)
7 April 2026; 19:15	Arroyave 12	(13–20)	Spasova 13	Palace of Culture and Sports Vasil Levski, Veliko Tarnovo; Attendance: 350; Referees: Bohoiavlenska, Molina-Hidalgo (USA)
7 April 2026; 19:15	1× (suspension)	Report	2× (suspension)	Palace of Culture and Sports Vasil Levski, Veliko Tarnovo; Attendance: 350; Referees: Bohoiavlenska, Molina-Hidalgo (USA)

8 April 2026; 14:45	Canada	35–28	Colombia	Palace of Culture and Sports Vasil Levski, Veliko Tarnovo; Attendance: 50; Referees: Bashev, Blazheva (BUL)
8 April 2026; 14:45	Boisclair 9	(16–14)	Espinosa 6	Palace of Culture and Sports Vasil Levski, Veliko Tarnovo; Attendance: 50; Referees: Bashev, Blazheva (BUL)
8 April 2026; 14:45	3× (suspension)	Report	3× (suspension)	Palace of Culture and Sports Vasil Levski, Veliko Tarnovo; Attendance: 50; Referees: Bashev, Blazheva (BUL)

8 April 2026; 19:15	Uzbekistan	33–34	Guinea	Palace of Culture and Sports Vasil Levski, Veliko Tarnovo; Attendance: 150; Referees: Berdić, Šorak (SRB)
8 April 2026; 19:15	Khasanova, Saparbaeva 7	(17–15)	D. Soumah 13	Palace of Culture and Sports Vasil Levski, Veliko Tarnovo; Attendance: 150; Referees: Berdić, Šorak (SRB)
8 April 2026; 19:15	7× (suspension)	Report	9× (suspension)	Palace of Culture and Sports Vasil Levski, Veliko Tarnovo; Attendance: 150; Referees: Berdić, Šorak (SRB)

9 April 2026; 14:45	Colombia	25–34	Guinea	Palace of Culture and Sports Vasil Levski, Veliko Tarnovo; Attendance: 150; Referees: Janz, Sug (GER)
9 April 2026; 14:45	Chica, Espinosa 6	(10–16)	K. Bangoura 7	Palace of Culture and Sports Vasil Levski, Veliko Tarnovo; Attendance: 150; Referees: Janz, Sug (GER)
9 April 2026; 14:45	4× (suspension)	Report	6× (suspension)	Palace of Culture and Sports Vasil Levski, Veliko Tarnovo; Attendance: 150; Referees: Janz, Sug (GER)

9 April 2026; 19:15	Bulgaria	31–28	Canada	Palace of Culture and Sports Vasil Levski, Veliko Tarnovo; Attendance: 630; Referees: Haggui, Haggui (TUN)
9 April 2026; 19:15	Delcheva 10	(17–11)	Boisclair 7	Palace of Culture and Sports Vasil Levski, Veliko Tarnovo; Attendance: 630; Referees: Haggui, Haggui (TUN)
9 April 2026; 19:15	3× (suspension)	Report	1× (yellow card) 2× (suspension)	Palace of Culture and Sports Vasil Levski, Veliko Tarnovo; Attendance: 630; Referees: Haggui, Haggui (TUN)

10 April 2026; 14:45	Uzbekistan	48–34	Colombia	Palace of Culture and Sports Vasil Levski, Veliko Tarnovo; Attendance: 180; Referees: Bashev, Blazheva (BUL)
10 April 2026; 14:45	Sharipboeva 16	(26–15)	Arroyave 10	Palace of Culture and Sports Vasil Levski, Veliko Tarnovo; Attendance: 180; Referees: Bashev, Blazheva (BUL)
10 April 2026; 14:45	3× (suspension)	Report		Palace of Culture and Sports Vasil Levski, Veliko Tarnovo; Attendance: 180; Referees: Bashev, Blazheva (BUL)

10 April 2026; 19:15	Guinea	33–20	Bulgaria	Palace of Culture and Sports Vasil Levski, Veliko Tarnovo; Attendance: 650; Referees: Dáné, Marton (HUN)
10 April 2026; 19:15	M. Camara 13	(16–12)	Spasova 7	Palace of Culture and Sports Vasil Levski, Veliko Tarnovo; Attendance: 650; Referees: Dáné, Marton (HUN)
10 April 2026; 19:15	4× (suspension)	Report	5× (suspension)	Palace of Culture and Sports Vasil Levski, Veliko Tarnovo; Attendance: 650; Referees: Dáné, Marton (HUN)

11 April 2026; 12:15	Bulgaria	33–33	Uzbekistan	Palace of Culture and Sports Vasil Levski, Veliko Tarnovo; Attendance: 370; Referees: Berdić, Šorak (SRB)
11 April 2026; 12:15	Spasova 10	(19–15)	Saparbaeva 110	Palace of Culture and Sports Vasil Levski, Veliko Tarnovo; Attendance: 370; Referees: Berdić, Šorak (SRB)
11 April 2026; 12:15	1× (yellow card) 7× (suspension)	Report	4× (suspension)	Palace of Culture and Sports Vasil Levski, Veliko Tarnovo; Attendance: 370; Referees: Berdić, Šorak (SRB)

11 April 2026; 16:45	Guinea	47–27	Canada	Palace of Culture and Sports Vasil Levski, Veliko Tarnovo; Attendance: 390; Referees: Janz, Sug (GER)
11 April 2026; 16:45	M. Camara 11	(25–11)	Botarel 10	Palace of Culture and Sports Vasil Levski, Veliko Tarnovo; Attendance: 390; Referees: Janz, Sug (GER)
11 April 2026; 16:45	3× (suspension)	Report	2× (suspension)	Palace of Culture and Sports Vasil Levski, Veliko Tarnovo; Attendance: 390; Referees: Janz, Sug (GER)

== Youth tournament ==
=== Qualification ===
Confederation	Dates	Host	Vacancies	Qualified
Africa (CAHB)	14–21 September 2025	(Algeria) Oran	1	Guinea
Oceania (OCHF)	13–17 October 2025	(Cook Islands) Avarua	~~1~~	~~New Caledonia~~
North America & the Caribbean (NACHC)	12–16 November 2025	Mexico City	1	Canada
South and Central America (SCAHC)	17–21 November 2025	(Paraguay) Asunción	1	Venezuela
Asia (AHF)	18–22 November 2025	(Thailand) Suphan Buri	1	Uzbekistan
Europe (EHF)	26–30 November 2025	(Kosovo) Pristina	1	Bulgaria

=== Standings ===
Pos	Team	Pld	W	D	L	GF	GA	GD	Pts
1	Guinea	4	3	1	0	154	119	+35	7
2	Bulgaria (H)	4	2	1	1	140	127	+13	5
3	Uzbekistan	4	2	0	2	153	136	+17	4
4	Canada	4	1	1	2	123	133	−10	3
5	Venezuela	4	0	1	3	106	161	−55	1

Source: IHF
Rules for classification: 1) points; 2) head-to-head points; 3) head-to-head goal difference; 4) head-to-head number of goals scored; 5) goal difference.
(H) Hosts

=== Results ===
All times are local (UTC+3).

7 April 2026; 12:30	Canada	30–30	Venezuela	Palace of Culture and Sports Vasil Levski, Veliko Tarnovo; Attendance: 120; Referees: Bashev, Blazheva (BUL)
7 April 2026; 12:30	Pelletier 7	(12–22)	Coronado 10	Palace of Culture and Sports Vasil Levski, Veliko Tarnovo; Attendance: 120; Referees: Bashev, Blazheva (BUL)
7 April 2026; 12:30	1× (suspension)	Report	8× (suspension)	Palace of Culture and Sports Vasil Levski, Veliko Tarnovo; Attendance: 120; Referees: Bashev, Blazheva (BUL)

7 April 2026; 17:00	Guinea	33–33	Bulgaria	Palace of Culture and Sports Vasil Levski, Veliko Tarnovo; Attendance: 350; Referees: Haggui, Haggui (TUN)
7 April 2026; 17:00	Soumah 7	(17–15)	Todorova 11	Palace of Culture and Sports Vasil Levski, Veliko Tarnovo; Attendance: 350; Referees: Haggui, Haggui (TUN)
7 April 2026; 17:00	1× (yellow card) 7× (suspension) 1× (red card)	Report	3× (suspension)	Palace of Culture and Sports Vasil Levski, Veliko Tarnovo; Attendance: 350; Referees: Haggui, Haggui (TUN)

8 April 2026; 12:30	Uzbekistan	38–31	Canada	Palace of Culture and Sports Vasil Levski, Veliko Tarnovo; Attendance: 100; Referees: Janz, Sug (GER)
8 April 2026; 12:30	Bayjanova 9	(18–10)	Morisette-Davies 9	Palace of Culture and Sports Vasil Levski, Veliko Tarnovo; Attendance: 100; Referees: Janz, Sug (GER)
8 April 2026; 12:30	8× (suspension)	Report	1× (yellow card) 4× (suspension)	Palace of Culture and Sports Vasil Levski, Veliko Tarnovo; Attendance: 100; Referees: Janz, Sug (GER)

8 April 2026; 17:00	Venezuela	28–41	Bulgaria	Palace of Culture and Sports Vasil Levski, Veliko Tarnovo; Attendance: 350; Referees: Bohoiavlenska, Molina-Hidalgo (USA)
8 April 2026; 17:00	Coronado 10	(12–21)	Todorova 11	Palace of Culture and Sports Vasil Levski, Veliko Tarnovo; Attendance: 350; Referees: Bohoiavlenska, Molina-Hidalgo (USA)
8 April 2026; 17:00	5× (suspension)	Report	1× (yellow card) 2× (suspension)	Palace of Culture and Sports Vasil Levski, Veliko Tarnovo; Attendance: 350; Referees: Bohoiavlenska, Molina-Hidalgo (USA)

9 April 2026; 12:30	Canada	32–36	Guinea	Palace of Culture and Sports Vasil Levski, Veliko Tarnovo; Attendance: 120; Referees: Dáné, Marton (HUN)
9 April 2026; 12:30	Morisette-Davies 9	(16–19)	Mansaré 11	Palace of Culture and Sports Vasil Levski, Veliko Tarnovo; Attendance: 120; Referees: Dáné, Marton (HUN)
9 April 2026; 12:30	1× (suspension)	Report	7× (suspension)	Palace of Culture and Sports Vasil Levski, Veliko Tarnovo; Attendance: 120; Referees: Dáné, Marton (HUN)

9 April 2026; 17:00	Venezuela	27–46	Uzbekistan	Palace of Culture and Sports Vasil Levski, Veliko Tarnovo; Attendance: 280; Referees: Berdić, Šorak (SRB)
9 April 2026; 17:00	Torrealba 8	(10–24)	Rasuljonova 10	Palace of Culture and Sports Vasil Levski, Veliko Tarnovo; Attendance: 280; Referees: Berdić, Šorak (SRB)
9 April 2026; 17:00	1× (yellow card) 5× (suspension)	Report	2× (suspension)	Palace of Culture and Sports Vasil Levski, Veliko Tarnovo; Attendance: 280; Referees: Berdić, Šorak (SRB)

10 April 2026; 12:30	Guinea	41–33	Uzbekistan	Palace of Culture and Sports Vasil Levski, Veliko Tarnovo; Attendance: 100; Referees: Haggui, Haggui (TUN)
10 April 2026; 12:30	Mab. Camara 12	(19–19)	Rasuljonova 9	Palace of Culture and Sports Vasil Levski, Veliko Tarnovo; Attendance: 100; Referees: Haggui, Haggui (TUN)
10 April 2026; 12:30	5× (suspension)	Report	3× (suspension) 1× (red card)	Palace of Culture and Sports Vasil Levski, Veliko Tarnovo; Attendance: 100; Referees: Haggui, Haggui (TUN)

10 April 2026; 17:00	Bulgaria	29–30	Canada	Palace of Culture and Sports Vasil Levski, Veliko Tarnovo; Attendance: 650; Referees: Bohoiavlenska, Molina-Hidalgo (USA)
10 April 2026; 17:00	Kostadinova 10	(13–14)	Morisette-Davies 13	Palace of Culture and Sports Vasil Levski, Veliko Tarnovo; Attendance: 650; Referees: Bohoiavlenska, Molina-Hidalgo (USA)
10 April 2026; 17:00	2× (suspension)	Report	3× (suspension)	Palace of Culture and Sports Vasil Levski, Veliko Tarnovo; Attendance: 650; Referees: Bohoiavlenska, Molina-Hidalgo (USA)

11 April 2026; 10:00	Venezuela	21–44	Guinea	Palace of Culture and Sports Vasil Levski, Veliko Tarnovo; Attendance: 80; Referees: Bohoiavlenska, Molina-Hidalgo (USA)
11 April 2026; 10:00	Loaiza, Mora 6	(9–22)	Mab. Camara 9	Palace of Culture and Sports Vasil Levski, Veliko Tarnovo; Attendance: 80; Referees: Bohoiavlenska, Molina-Hidalgo (USA)
11 April 2026; 10:00	3× (suspension)	Report	3× (suspension)	Palace of Culture and Sports Vasil Levski, Veliko Tarnovo; Attendance: 80; Referees: Bohoiavlenska, Molina-Hidalgo (USA)

11 April 2026; 14:30	Bulgaria	37–36	Uzbekistan	Palace of Culture and Sports Vasil Levski, Veliko Tarnovo; Attendance: 560; Referees: Dáné, Marton (HUN)
11 April 2026; 14:30	Todorova 11	(21–15)	Turgunova 8	Palace of Culture and Sports Vasil Levski, Veliko Tarnovo; Attendance: 560; Referees: Dáné, Marton (HUN)
11 April 2026; 14:30	5× (suspension)	Report	1× (yellow card) 2× (suspension)	Palace of Culture and Sports Vasil Levski, Veliko Tarnovo; Attendance: 560; Referees: Dáné, Marton (HUN)
