= 2022 Oceania Men's Handball Challenge Trophy =

International handball competition

The 2022 Men's Oceania Handball Challenge Trophy was held at Rarotonga, Cook Islands between 5 and 9 December 2022.

This is the seventh ever championship. The competition participants were defending champions Australia, the hosts Cook Islands, New Zealand, hosts New Caledonia and Tonga.

Australia won their fifth title in the round robin event. Hosts New Caledonia were second followed by New Zealand, the Cook Islands and Tonga. The Under-18 competition was won by Tahiti.

Australia now qualify for the 2023 Men's Junior World Handball Championship in Germany and the 2023 IHF Inter-Continental Trophy

== Results ==
Team	Pld	W	D	L	GF	GA	GD	Pts
Australia	4	4	0	0	120	61	+59	8
New Caledonia	4	3	0	1	131	87	+44	6
New Zealand	4	2	0	2	112	91	+21	4
Cook Islands	4	1	0	3	68	131	−63	2
Tonga	4	0	0	4	63	124	−61	0

Source: Report

5 December 2022; 12:00	New Caledonia	28 - 30	Australia

18:00	Cook Islands	31 - 25	Tonga

6 December 2022; 12:00	Tonga	9 - 31	Australia

18:00	Cook Islands	14 - 35	New Zealand

7 December 2022; 12:00	New Caledonia	30 - 29	New Zealand

18:00	Australia	30 - 6	Cook Islands

8 December 2022; 12:00	New Zealand	18 - 29	Australia

18:00	Tonga	11 - 32	New Caledonia

9 December 2022; 12:00	Tonga	18 - 30	New Zealand

18:00	New Caledonia	41 - 17	Cook Islands

== Rankings ==
Classification
1st place, gold medalist(s)	Australia
2nd place, silver medalist(s)	New Caledonia
3rd place, bronze medalist(s)	New Zealand
4	Cook Islands
5	Tonga
