= 2014 Oceania Men's Handball Challenge Trophy =

The 2014 Men's Oceania Handball Challenge Trophy was held at the ASB Sports Centre in Wellington, New Zealand between 8 and 13 December 2014.

The competition participants were defending champions Australia, host New Zealand, regulars Vanuatu and Cook Islands. New to the championship were America Samoa, Tahiti (French Polynesia), New Caledonia, Papua New Guinea and Samoa.

Tahiti were the winner upsetting Australia in the final and going through undefeated. Third was New Caledonia over host New Zealand. Fifth was Vanuatu, then Papua New Guinea, Samoa, America Samoa and Cook Islands.

== Men's Results ==
=== Pool A ===
| Team | Pld | W | D | L | GF | GA | GD | Pts |
|---|---|---|---|---|---|---|---|---|
| New Caledonia | 3 | 3 | 0 | 0 | 99 | 69 | +30 | 6 |
| New Zealand | 3 | 2 | 0 | 1 | 112 | 68 | +44 | 4 |
| Vanuatu | 3 | 1 | 0 | 2 | 90 | 83 | +7 | 2 |
| American Samoa | 3 | 0 | 0 | 3 | 33 | 114 | −81 | 0 |

| 8 December 2014 | New Zealand | 27 – 29 | New Caledonia | ASB Sports Centre, Wellington, New Zealand |

| American Samoa | 10 – 32 | Vanuatu | ASB Sports Centre, Wellington, New Zealand |

| 9 December 2014 | New Zealand | 34 – 26 | Vanuatu | ASB Sports Centre, Wellington, New Zealand |

| American Samoa | 10 – 31 | New Caledonia | ASB Sports Centre, Wellington, New Zealand |

| 10 December 2014 | New Zealand | 51 – 13 | American Samoa | ASB Sports Centre, Wellington, New Zealand |

| 11 December 2014 | New Caledonia | 39 – 32 | Vanuatu | ASB Sports Centre, Wellington, New Zealand |

=== Pool B ===
| Team | Pld | W | D | L | GF | GA | GD | Pts |
|---|---|---|---|---|---|---|---|---|
| French Polynesia | 4 | 4 | 0 | 0 | 145 | 65 | +80 | 8 |
| Australia | 4 | 3 | 0 | 1 | 139 | 61 | +78 | 6 |
| Papua New Guinea | 4 | 2 | 0 | 2 | 69 | 109 | −40 | 4 |
| Cook Islands | 4 | 1 | 0 | 3 | 72 | 116 | −44 | 2 |
| Samoa | 4 | 0 | 0 | 4 | 55 | 129 | −74 | 0 |

| 8 December 2014 | French Polynesia | 26 – 19 | Australia | ASB Sports Centre, Wellington, New Zealand |

| Samoa | 17 – 22 | Cook Islands | ASB Sports Centre, Wellington, New Zealand |

| Australia | 40 – 11 | Papua New Guinea | ASB Sports Centre, Wellington, New Zealand |

| 9 December 2014 | Cook Islands | 15 – 20 | Papua New Guinea | ASB Sports Centre, Wellington, New Zealand |

| Australia | 37 – 13 | Samoa | ASB Sports Centre, Wellington, New Zealand |

| French Polynesia | 36 – 15 | Papua New Guinea | ASB Sports Centre, Wellington, New Zealand |

| 10 December 2014 | Australia | 43 – 11 | Cook Islands | ASB Sports Centre, Wellington, New Zealand |

| French Polynesia | 47 – 7 | Samoa | ASB Sports Centre, Wellington, New Zealand |

| 11 December 2014 | French Polynesia | 36 – 24 | Cook Islands | ASB Sports Centre, Wellington, New Zealand |

| Samoa | 18 – 23 | Papua New Guinea | ASB Sports Centre, Wellington, New Zealand |

=== 5th to 9th place ===
Each team to play each other once. Round robin rounds and additional games to finalize positions.

| Team | Pld | W | D | L | GF | GA | GD | Pts |
|---|---|---|---|---|---|---|---|---|
| Vanuatu | 4 | 3 | 0 | 1 | 146 | 69 | +77 | 6 |
| Papua New Guinea | 4 | 3 | 0 | 1 | 86 | 93 | −7 | 6 |
| Samoa | 4 | 2 | 0 | 2 | 84 | 92 | −8 | 4 |
| American Samoa | 4 | 1 | 0 | 3 | 77 | 100 | −23 | 2 |
| Cook Islands | 4 | 1 | 0 | 3 | 72 | 111 | −39 | 2 |

| 8 December 2014 | American Samoa | 10 – 32 | Vanuatu | ASB Sports Centre, Wellington, New Zealand |

| Samoa | 17 – 22 | Cook Islands | ASB Sports Centre, Wellington, New Zealand |

| 9 December 2014 | Cook Islands | 15 – 20 | Papua New Guinea | ASB Sports Centre, Wellington, New Zealand |
| 9 December 2014 | | Report | | ASB Sports Centre, Wellington, New Zealand |

| 11 December 2014 | Samoa | 18 – 23 | Papua New Guinea | ASB Sports Centre, Wellington, New Zealand |

| 12 December 2014 | American Samoa | 29 – 30 | Samoa | ASB Sports Centre, Wellington, New Zealand |

| Papua New Guinea | 25 – 43 | Vanuatu | ASB Sports Centre, Wellington, New Zealand |

| Cook Islands | 15 – 53 | Vanuatu | ASB Sports Centre, Wellington, New Zealand |

| 13 December 2014 | American Samoa | 17 – 18 | Papua New Guinea | ASB Sports Centre, Wellington, New Zealand |

| Samoa | 19 – 18 | Vanuatu | ASB Sports Centre, Wellington, New Zealand |

| Cook Islands | 20 – 21 | American Samoa | ASB Sports Centre, Wellington, New Zealand |

=== Semi finals ===
| 12 December 2014 | New Caledonia | 21 – 23 | Australia | ASB Sports Centre, Wellington, New Zealand |

| New Zealand | 29 – 31 | French Polynesia | ASB Sports Centre, Wellington, New Zealand |

=== Third place game ===
| 13 December 2014; 13:45 | New Zealand | 25 – 29 | New Caledonia | ASB Sports Centre, Wellington, New Zealand |

=== Final ===
| 13 December 2014 | French Polynesia | 20 – 17 | Australia | ASB Sports Centre, Wellington, New Zealand; Referees: Robert Ridley, Richard Ridley (AUS) |

== Rankings ==
Classification
| 1st place, gold medalist(s) | French Polynesia |
| 2nd place, silver medalist(s) | Australia |
| 3rd place, bronze medalist(s) | New Caledonia |
| 4 | New Zealand |
| 5 | Vanuatu |
| 6 | Papua New Guinea |
| 7 | Samoa |
| 8 | American Samoa |
| 9 | Cook Islands |
