= Cook Islands men's national junior handball team =

Cook Islands

Information
- Association: Cook Islands Handball Association

Colours
1st	2nd

Results

IHF U-21 World Championship
- Appearances: None

Oceania Handball Challenge Trophy
- Appearances: 5 (First in 2010)
- Best result: 4th twice
- Last updated on 9 August 2017.

The Coke Islands national junior handball team is the national junior men's handball team of Cook Islands.

The team came fourth in the 2022 Oceania Men's Handball Challenge Trophy.

== Oceania Handball Challenge Trophy record ==
Year	Position
Sydney 1998	did not enter
Brisbane 2010	4th
Apia 2012	4th
Wellington 2014	9th
Rarotonga 2017	6th
New Caledonia 2018	6th
Rarotonga 2022	4th
Total	6/7
