= 2025 IHF Trophy U19 – North America and the Caribbean =

Women's Junior Handball Championship qualifier

Tournament details
- Host country: Canada
- Venue: 1 (in 1 host city)
- Dates: 16–20 July
- Teams: 6 (from 1 confederation)

Final positions
- Champions: Canada
- Runners-up: United States
- Third place: Greenland
- Fourth place: Puerto Rico

Tournament statistics
- Matches played: 15

The 2025 IHF Trophy U19 – North America and the Caribbean took place in Drummondville, Canada, from 16 to 20 July 2025. It acted as the North America and Caribbean qualifying tournament for the 2026 IHF Women's U20 Handball World Championship and 2026 IHF Inter-Continental Trophy.

Mexico were the defending champions. Canada won the championship after winning the round robin and qualified for the World Championship alongside the runners-up, United States.

== Teams ==
- Canada
- Greenland
- Puerto Rico
- Mexico
- Saint Kitts and Nevis
- United States

== Standings ==
Pos	Team	Pld	W	D	L	GF	GA	GD	Pts	Qualification
1st place, gold medalist(s)	Canada (H)	5	4	0	1	189	102	+87	8	2026 IHF Women's U20 Handball World Championship and 2026 IHF Inter-Continental Trophy
2nd place, silver medalist(s)	United States	5	3	1	1	150	100	+50	7	2026 IHF Women's U20 Handball World Championship
3rd place, bronze medalist(s)	Greenland	5	2	1	2	182	116	+66	5 (Note: Head to head points: Greenland 3; Puerto Rico 2; Mexico 1.)	
4	Puerto Rico	5	2	1	2	159	137	+22	5	
5	Mexico	5	2	1	2	178	126	+52	5	
6	Saint Kitts and Nevis	5	0	0	5	18	295	−277	0	

Source: 2025 IHF Trophy U19 – North America and the Caribbean
Rules for classification: 1) Points; 2) Head-to-head points; 3) Head-to-head goal difference; 4) Head-to-head goals scored; 5) Goal difference; 6) Goals scored; 7) Draw.
(H) Hosts

== Results ==
All times are local.

16 July 2025; 16:00	Greenland	81–2	Saint Kitts and Nevis	Marie-River High School, Drummondville
16 July 2025; 16:00		(41–0)		Marie-River High School, Drummondville
16 July 2025; 16:00		Report		Marie-River High School, Drummondville

16 July 2025; 18:00	Mexico	21–22	United States	Marie-River High School, Drummondville
16 July 2025; 18:00		(9–7)		Marie-River High School, Drummondville
16 July 2025; 18:00		Report		Marie-River High School, Drummondville

16 July 2025; 20:00	Puerto Rico	22–38	Canada	Marie-River High School, Drummondville
16 July 2025; 20:00		(9–17)		Marie-River High School, Drummondville
16 July 2025; 20:00		Report		Marie-River High School, Drummondville

17 July 2025; 16:00	Puerto Rico	28–28	United States	Marie-River High School, Drummondville
17 July 2025; 16:00		(9–13)		Marie-River High School, Drummondville
17 July 2025; 16:00		Report		Marie-River High School, Drummondville

17 July 2025; 18:00	Greenland	26–26	Mexico	Marie-River High School, Drummondville
17 July 2025; 18:00		(12–15)		Marie-River High School, Drummondville
17 July 2025; 18:00		Report		Marie-River High School, Drummondville

17 July 2025; 20:00	Saint Kitts and Nevis	0–63	Canada	Marie-River High School, Drummondville
17 July 2025; 20:00		(0–33)		Marie-River High School, Drummondville
17 July 2025; 20:00		Report		Marie-River High School, Drummondville

18 July 2025; 16:00	Mexico	64–4	Saint Kitts and Nevis	Marie-River High School, Drummondville
18 July 2025; 16:00		(29–2)		Marie-River High School, Drummondville
18 July 2025; 16:00		Report		Marie-River High School, Drummondville

18 July 2025; 18:00	Puerto Rico	22–26	Greenland	Marie-River High School, Drummondville
18 July 2025; 18:00		(13–12)		Marie-River High School, Drummondville
18 July 2025; 18:00		Report		Marie-River High School, Drummondville

18 July 2025; 20:00	United States	22–26	Canada	Marie-River High School, Drummondville
18 July 2025; 20:00		(13–12)		Marie-River High School, Drummondville
18 July 2025; 20:00		Report		Marie-River High School, Drummondville

19 July 2025; 14:00	United States	31–22	Greenland	Marie-River High School, Drummondville
19 July 2025; 14:00		(10–11)		Marie-River High School, Drummondville
19 July 2025; 14:00		Report		Marie-River High School, Drummondville

19 July 2025; 16:00	Saint Kitts and Nevis	9–40	Puerto Rico	Marie-River High School, Drummondville
19 July 2025; 16:00		(4–20)		Marie-River High School, Drummondville
19 July 2025; 16:00		Report		Marie-River High School, Drummondville

19 July 2025; 18:00	Canada	34–35	Mexico	Marie-River High School, Drummondville
19 July 2025; 18:00		(16–19)		Marie-River High School, Drummondville
19 July 2025; 18:00		Report		Marie-River High School, Drummondville

20 July 2025; 14:00	Mexico	32–40	Puerto Rico	Marie-River High School, Drummondville
20 July 2025; 14:00		(17–21)		Marie-River High School, Drummondville
20 July 2025; 14:00		Report		Marie-River High School, Drummondville

20 July 2025; 16:00	United States	47–3	Saint Kitts and Nevis	Marie-River High School, Drummondville
20 July 2025; 16:00		(25–2)		Marie-River High School, Drummondville

20 July 2025; 18:00	Canada	28–23	Greenland	Marie-River High School, Drummondville
20 July 2025; 18:00		(13–14)		Marie-River High School, Drummondville
20 July 2025; 18:00		Report		Marie-River High School, Drummondville

== See also ==
- Nor.Ca. Women's Handball Championship
- 2026 IHF Women's U20 Handball World Championship
- 2026 IHF Inter-Continental Trophy
