= 2025 IHF Inter-Continental Trophy =

2025 Men's IHF Inter-Continental Trophy
Tournament details
- Host country: Kosovo
- Venue: 1 (in 1 host city)
- Dates: 12–16 March

The 2025 IHF Inter-Continental Trophy was held in Pristina, Kosovo from 12 to 16 March 2025. It featured a men's youth (U-19) tournament and a men's junior (U-21) tournament.

== Junior tournament ==
=== Qualification ===
Confederation	Dates	Host	Vacancies	Qualified
South and Central America (SCAHC)	29 October – 2 November 2024	(Nicaragua) Managua	1	Nicaragua
Africa (CAHB)	2–6 November 2024	(Ethiopia) Addis Ababa	1	Rwanda
North America & the Caribbean (NACHC)	4–8 December 2024	Mexico City	1	United States
Oceania (OCHF)	16–20 December 2024	(French Polynesia) Papeete	1	New Caledonia
Asia (AHF)	3–7 January 2025	(India) Lucknow	1	Uzbekistan
Europe (EHF)	14–18 January 2025	(Kosovo) Pristina	1	Bulgaria

=== Preliminary round ===
All times are local (UTC+1).

==== Group A ====
Pos	Team	Pld	W	D	L	GF	GA	GD	Pts	Qualification
1	Bulgaria	2	2	0	0	60	46	+14	4	Semifinals
2	United States	2	1	0	1	55	45	+10	2	Semifinals
3	New Caledonia	2	0	0	2	46	70	−24	0	Fifth place game

Source: IHF
Rules for classification: 1) points; 2) head-to-head points; 3) head-to-head goal difference; 4) head-to-head number of goals scored; 5) goal difference.

12 March 2025; 11:00	New Caledonia	25–36	Bulgaria	Palace of Youth and Sports, Pristina; Referees: Nygren, Borge (NOR)
12 March 2025; 11:00	three players 4	(7–17)	Nikolov 7	Palace of Youth and Sports, Pristina; Referees: Nygren, Borge (NOR)
12 March 2025; 11:00	6× (suspension) 1× (red card)	Report	5× (suspension)	Palace of Youth and Sports, Pristina; Referees: Nygren, Borge (NOR)

13 March 2025; 11:00	Bulgaria	24–21	United States	Palace of Youth and Sports, Pristina; Referees: Picard, Vauchez (FRA)
13 March 2025; 11:00	Marev 10	(9–10)	Campos Menendez 6	Palace of Youth and Sports, Pristina; Referees: Picard, Vauchez (FRA)
13 March 2025; 11:00	4× (suspension)	Report	10× (suspension) 1× (red card)	Palace of Youth and Sports, Pristina; Referees: Picard, Vauchez (FRA)

14 March 2025; 13:00	United States	34–21	New Caledonia	Palace of Youth and Sports, Pristina; Referees: Al-Suqufi, Al-Saqer (KSA)
14 March 2025; 13:00	Campos Menendez, Darvas 6	(18–9)	Waheo 4	Palace of Youth and Sports, Pristina; Referees: Al-Suqufi, Al-Saqer (KSA)
14 March 2025; 13:00	2× (suspension)	Report	1× (yellow card) 7× (suspension)	Palace of Youth and Sports, Pristina; Referees: Al-Suqufi, Al-Saqer (KSA)

==== Group B ====
Pos	Team	Pld	W	D	L	GF	GA	GD	Pts	Qualification
1	Rwanda	2	2	0	0	90	59	+31	4	Semifinals
2	Uzbekistan	2	1	0	1	71	70	+1	2	Semifinals
3	Nicaragua	2	0	0	2	57	89	−32	0	Fifth place game

Source: IHF
Rules for classification: 1) points; 2) head-to-head points; 3) head-to-head goal difference; 4) head-to-head number of goals scored; 5) goal difference.

12 March 2025; 13:00	Uzbekistan	39–30	Nicaragua	Palace of Youth and Sports, Pristina; Referees: Picard, Vauchez (FRA)
12 March 2025; 13:00	Zokirov 10	(19–15)	Romero 7	Palace of Youth and Sports, Pristina; Referees: Picard, Vauchez (FRA)
12 March 2025; 13:00	4× (suspension) 1× (red card) 1×	Report	4× (suspension)	Palace of Youth and Sports, Pristina; Referees: Picard, Vauchez (FRA)

13 March 2025; 13:00	Nicaragua	27–50	Rwanda	Palace of Youth and Sports, Pristina; Referees: Bozhinovski, Nachevski (MKD)
13 March 2025; 13:00	Z. Pérez 6	(10–28)	Kayijamahe 11	Palace of Youth and Sports, Pristina; Referees: Bozhinovski, Nachevski (MKD)
13 March 2025; 13:00	1× (suspension)	Report	5× (suspension)	Palace of Youth and Sports, Pristina; Referees: Bozhinovski, Nachevski (MKD)

14 March 2025; 15:00	Rwanda	40–32	Uzbekistan	Palace of Youth and Sports, Pristina; Referees: Nygren, Borge (NOR)
14 March 2025; 15:00	Ndayishimiye 12	(20–18)	Joldasbaev 11	Palace of Youth and Sports, Pristina; Referees: Nygren, Borge (NOR)
14 March 2025; 15:00	1× (yellow card) 8× (suspension)	Report	1× (suspension) 2× (red card)	Palace of Youth and Sports, Pristina; Referees: Nygren, Borge (NOR)

=== Knockout round ===
==== Bracket ====
Semi-finals
15 March
Bulgaria	33
Uzbekistan	41
15 March
Rwanda	28
United States	32

Final
16 March
Uzbekistan	32
United States	33
Third place
16 March
Bulgaria	31
Rwanda	48

==== Semifinals ====
15 March 2025; 11:00	Bulgaria	33–41	Uzbekistan	Palace of Youth and Sports, Pristina; Referees: Bozhinovski, Nachevski (MKD)
15 March 2025; 11:00	Nikolov 13	(16–19)	Zokirov 9	Palace of Youth and Sports, Pristina; Referees: Bozhinovski, Nachevski (MKD)
15 March 2025; 11:00	4× (suspension) 1× (red card)	Report	1× (yellow card) 6× (suspension)	Palace of Youth and Sports, Pristina; Referees: Bozhinovski, Nachevski (MKD)

15 March 2025; 13:30	Rwanda	28–32	United States	Palace of Youth and Sports, Pristina
15 March 2025; 13:30	Mbesutunguwe, Ndayishimiye 8	(13–14)	Campos Menendez, Trummer 9	Palace of Youth and Sports, Pristina
15 March 2025; 13:30	4× (suspension)	Report	4× (suspension)	Palace of Youth and Sports, Pristina

==== Fifth place game ====
16 March 2025; 09:00	New Caledonia	29–44	Nicaragua	Palace of Youth and Sports, Pristina; Referees: Linster, Rauchs (LUX)
16 March 2025; 09:00	four players 4	(18–22)	Romero 11	Palace of Youth and Sports, Pristina; Referees: Linster, Rauchs (LUX)
16 March 2025; 09:00	8× (suspension)	Report		Palace of Youth and Sports, Pristina; Referees: Linster, Rauchs (LUX)

==== Third place game ====
16 March 2025; 11:00	Bulgaria	31–48	Rwanda	Palace of Youth and Sports, Pristina; Referees: Nygren, Borge (NOR)
16 March 2025; 11:00	Dimitrov 8	(18–21)	Kayijamahe 14	Palace of Youth and Sports, Pristina; Referees: Nygren, Borge (NOR)
16 March 2025; 11:00	4× (suspension)	Report	6× (suspension)	Palace of Youth and Sports, Pristina; Referees: Nygren, Borge (NOR)

==== Final ====
16 March 2025; 15:00	Uzbekistan	32–33	United States	Palace of Youth and Sports, Pristina; Referees: Bozhinovski, Nachevski (MKD)
16 March 2025; 15:00	Eshonkulov 10	(13–18)	Campos Menendez 12	Palace of Youth and Sports, Pristina; Referees: Bozhinovski, Nachevski (MKD)
16 March 2025; 15:00	1× (yellow card) 2× (suspension)		1× (yellow card) 8× (suspension)	Palace of Youth and Sports, Pristina; Referees: Bozhinovski, Nachevski (MKD)

=== Final ranking ===
Rank	Team
1	United States
2	Uzbekistan
3	Rwanda
4	Bulgaria
5	Nicaragua
6	New Caledonia

== Youth tournament ==
=== Qualification ===
Confederation	Dates	Host	Vacancies	Qualified
Africa (CAHB)	2–6 November 2024	(Ethiopia) Addis Ababa	1	Nigeria
South and Central America (SCAHC)	5–9 November 2024	(Nicaragua) Managua	1	Nicaragua
North America & the Caribbean (NACHC)	20–24 November 2024	(Puerto Rico) San Juan	1	United States
Oceania (OCHF)	16–20 December 2024	(French Polynesia) Papeete	1	New Caledonia
Asia (AHF)	3–7 January 2025	(India) Lucknow	1	Uzbekistan
Europe (EHF)	14–18 January 2025	(Kosovo) Pristina	1	Kosovo

=== Preliminary round ===
All times are local (UTC+1).

==== Group A ====
Pos	Team	Pld	W	D	L	GF	GA	GD	Pts	Qualification
1	Uzbekistan	2	2	0	0	69	55	+14	4	Semifinals
2	United States	2	1	0	1	66	64	+2	2	Semifinals
3	Nicaragua	2	0	0	2	54	70	−16	0	Fifth place game

Source: IHF
Rules for classification: 1) points; 2) head-to-head points; 3) head-to-head goal difference; 4) head-to-head number of goals scored; 5) goal difference.

12 March 2025; 15:00	Uzbekistan	36–23	Nicaragua	Palace of Youth and Sports, Pristina; Referees: Linster, Rauchs (LUX)
12 March 2025; 15:00	Bozorboev 8	(14–12)	López 5	Palace of Youth and Sports, Pristina; Referees: Linster, Rauchs (LUX)
12 March 2025; 15:00	4× (suspension) 1× (red card)	Report	1× (yellow card) 2× (suspension) 1× (red card)	Palace of Youth and Sports, Pristina; Referees: Linster, Rauchs (LUX)

13 March 2025; 15:00	United States	34–31	Nicaragua	Palace of Youth and Sports, Pristina; Referees: Al-Suqufi, Al-Saqer (KSA)
13 March 2025; 15:00	Gomez de Santiago 7	(18–13)	Meza 9	Palace of Youth and Sports, Pristina; Referees: Al-Suqufi, Al-Saqer (KSA)
13 March 2025; 15:00	6× (suspension)	Report	1× (suspension)	Palace of Youth and Sports, Pristina; Referees: Al-Suqufi, Al-Saqer (KSA)

14 March 2025; 17:00	United States	32–33	Uzbekistan	Palace of Youth and Sports, Pristina; Referees: Bozhinovski, Nachevski (MKD)
14 March 2025; 17:00	Neumaier 9	(15–15)	Abdukarimov 9	Palace of Youth and Sports, Pristina; Referees: Bozhinovski, Nachevski (MKD)
14 March 2025; 17:00	1× (yellow card) 5× (suspension)	Report	1× (yellow card) 2× (suspension)	Palace of Youth and Sports, Pristina; Referees: Bozhinovski, Nachevski (MKD)

==== Group B ====
Pos	Team	Pld	W	D	L	GF	GA	GD	Pts	Qualification
1	Kosovo (H)	2	2	0	0	66	42	+24	4	Semifinals
2	Nigeria	2	1	0	1	64	59	+5	2	Semifinals
3	New Caledonia	2	0	0	2	44	73	−29	0	Fifth place game

Source: IHF
Rules for classification: 1) points; 2) head-to-head points; 3) head-to-head goal difference; 4) head-to-head number of goals scored; 5) goal difference.
(H) Hosts

12 March 2025; 17:00	New Caledonia	29–37	Nigeria	Palace of Youth and Sports, Pristina; Referees: Bozhinovski, Nachevski (MKD)
12 March 2025; 17:00	Alakiletoa 13	(15–19)	Must. Mohammed 14	Palace of Youth and Sports, Pristina; Referees: Bozhinovski, Nachevski (MKD)
12 March 2025; 17:00		Report	4× (suspension)	Palace of Youth and Sports, Pristina; Referees: Bozhinovski, Nachevski (MKD)

13 March 2025; 17:00	Nigeria	27–30	Kosovo	Palace of Youth and Sports, Pristina; Referees: Nygren, Borge (NOR)
13 March 2025; 17:00	Foloki 8	(16–12)	Muqolli 8	Palace of Youth and Sports, Pristina; Referees: Nygren, Borge (NOR)
13 March 2025; 17:00	4× (suspension) 2× (red card)	Report	1× (yellow card) 9× (suspension) 2× (red card)	Palace of Youth and Sports, Pristina; Referees: Nygren, Borge (NOR)

14 March 2025; 19:00	Kosovo	36–15	New Caledonia	Palace of Youth and Sports, Pristina; Referees: Linster, Rauchs (LUX)
14 March 2025; 19:00	Kadiri 14	(20–6)	Alakiletoa 4	Palace of Youth and Sports, Pristina; Referees: Linster, Rauchs (LUX)
14 March 2025; 19:00	3× (suspension)	Report	6× (suspension)	Palace of Youth and Sports, Pristina; Referees: Linster, Rauchs (LUX)

=== Knockout round ===
==== Bracket ====
Semi-finals
15 March
Uzbekistan	29
Nigeria	43
15 March
Kosovo	27
United States	26

Final
16 March
Nigeria	30
Kosovo (ET)	34
Third place
16 March
Uzbekistan	36
United States	38

==== Semifinals ====
15 March 2025; 16:00	Uzbekistan	29–43	Nigeria	Palace of Youth and Sports, Pristina; Referees: Nygren, Borge (NOR)
15 March 2025; 16:00	Turgunov 10	(13–24)	Must. Mohammed 17	Palace of Youth and Sports, Pristina; Referees: Nygren, Borge (NOR)
15 March 2025; 16:00	1× (yellow card) 5× (suspension)	Report	3× (suspension)	Palace of Youth and Sports, Pristina; Referees: Nygren, Borge (NOR)

15 March 2025; 18:30	Kosovo	27–26	United States	Palace of Youth and Sports, Pristina; Referees: Picard, Vauchez (FRA)
15 March 2025; 18:30	Mulaj, Muqolli 9	(13–11)	Long 7	Palace of Youth and Sports, Pristina; Referees: Picard, Vauchez (FRA)
15 March 2025; 18:30	1× (yellow card) 2× (suspension)		3× (suspension)	Palace of Youth and Sports, Pristina; Referees: Picard, Vauchez (FRA)

==== Fifth place game ====
15 March 2025; 09:00	Nicaragua	30–28	New Caledonia	Palace of Youth and Sports, Pristina; Referees: Linster, Rauchs (LUX)
15 March 2025; 09:00	Silva 6	(14–12)	Mauligalo 7	Palace of Youth and Sports, Pristina; Referees: Linster, Rauchs (LUX)
15 March 2025; 09:00	2× (suspension)	Report		Palace of Youth and Sports, Pristina; Referees: Linster, Rauchs (LUX)

==== Third place game ====
16 March 2025; 13:00	Uzbekistan	36–38	United States	Palace of Youth and Sports, Pristina; Referees: Picard, Vauchez (FRA)
16 March 2025; 13:00	Abdukarimov 9	(12–20)	Long 10	Palace of Youth and Sports, Pristina; Referees: Picard, Vauchez (FRA)
16 March 2025; 13:00	1× (yellow card) 7× (suspension) 1× (red card)	Report	2× (suspension)	Palace of Youth and Sports, Pristina; Referees: Picard, Vauchez (FRA)

==== Final ====
16 March 2025
17:30
Nigeria
30–34 (ET)
Kosovo
Palace of Youth and Sports, Pristina
Referees: Al-Suqufi, Al-Saqer (KSA)
Foloki 7
(13–13)
Muqolli 9
6× (suspension)
Report
4× (suspension)

FT: 26–26 ET: 4–8

=== Final ranking ===
Rank	Team
1	Kosovo
2	Nigeria
3	United States
4	Uzbekistan
5	Nicaragua
6	New Caledonia

Team qualified to the 2025 IHF Men's U19 Handball World Championship
