= 2018 Oceania Youth Handball Championship =

International handball competition

The 2018 Men's Oceania Youth Handball Championship is to be held at the L'Arene du Sud, New Caledonia between 10 - 15 June 2018.

This is the first championship since 2011. The competition participants were defending champions New Zealand, Australia, Cook Islands, Fiji, hosts New Caledonia and Papua New Guinea.

New Zealand successfully defended their title, beating out New Caledonia for first place. Third was Australia followed by Fiji, Papua New Guinea and The Cook Islands.

== Results ==
Team	Pld	W	D	L	GF	GA	GD	Pts
New Zealand	5	5	0	0	170	79	+91	10
New Caledonia	5	4	0	1	176	95	+81	8
Australia	5	3	0	2	136	108	+28	6
Fiji	5	2	0	3	116	164	−48	4
Papua New Guinea	5	1	0	4	157	149	+8	2
Cook Islands	5	0	0	5	28	188	−160	0

10 June, 2018; 18:00	New Caledonia	31 - 3	Cook Islands	L'Arene du Sud, New Caledonia

11 June 2018; 10:00	New Zealand	41 - 20	Fiji	L'Arene du Sud, New Caledonia

12:00	Cook Islands	4 - 50	Papua New Guinea	L'Arene du Sud, New Caledonia

14:00	New Caledonia	37 - 23	Australia	L'Arene du Sud, New Caledonia

12 June 2018; 10:00	New Zealand	34 - 18	Papua New Guinea	L'Arene du Sud, New Caledonia

12:00	Fiji	15 - 46	New Caledonia	L'Arene du Sud, New Caledonia

14:00	Cook Islands	3 - 35	Australia	L'Arene du Sud, New Caledonia

13 June 2018; 10:00	Australia	33 - 27	Papua New Guinea	L'Arene du Sud, New Caledonia

12:00	Cook Islands	8 - 29	Fiji	L'Arene du Sud, New Caledonia

14:00	New Caledonia	20 - 27	New Zealand	L'Arene du Sud, New Caledonia

14 June 2018; 10:00	Cook Islands	10 - 43	New Zealand	L'Arene du Sud, New Caledonia

12:00	Australia	34 - 16	Fiji	L'Arene du Sud, New Caledonia

14:00	Papua New Guinea	27 - 42	New Caledonia	L'Arene du Sud, New Caledonia

15 June 2018; 10:00	New Zealand	25 - 11	Australia	L'Arene du Sud, New Caledonia

12:00	Papua New Guinea	35 - 36	Fiji	L'Arene du Sud, New Caledonia

== Rankings ==
Classification
1st place, gold medalist(s)	New Zealand
2nd place, silver medalist(s)	New Caledonia
3rd place, bronze medalist(s)	Australia
4	Fiji
5	Papua New Guinea
6	Cook Islands
