= 2019 Oceania Women's Handball Challenge Trophy =

The 2019 Women's Oceania Handball Challenge Trophy was held in New Caledonia from 11 to 16 August 2019.

The competition participants were defending champions New Zealand, host New Caledonia, regulars Australia and American Samoa. New to the championship were Papua New Guinea, and Fiji.

Hosts New Caledonia were the clear winners over Australia. Third was New Zealand then American Samoa. Fifth was Papua New Guinea ahead of Fiji on goal difference

However, New Caledonia are ineligible for World Championship and consequently, spot for 2020 Women's Junior World Handball Championship is taken by second place Australia.

== Results ==
Team	Pld	W	D	L	GF	GA	GD	Pts
New Caledonia	5	5	0	0	209	46	+163	10
Australia	5	4	0	1	128	73	+55	8
New Zealand	5	3	0	2	80	112	−32	6
American Samoa	5	2	0	3	107	117	−10	4
Papua New Guinea	5	0	1	4	43	131	−88	1
Fiji	5	0	1	4	53	144	−91	1

11 August 2019	New Caledonia	58 – 5	Papua New Guinea	L'Arène du Sud, Païta, New Caledonia

12 August 2019	Papua New Guinea	10 – 23	American Samoa	L'Arène du Sud, Païta, New Caledonia

Australia	39 – 6	Fiji	L'Arène du Sud, Païta, New Caledonia

New Zealand	11 – 44	New Caledonia	L'Arène du Sud, Païta, New Caledonia

13 August 2019	American Samoa	27 – 16	Fiji	L'Arène du Sud, Païta, New Caledonia

Papua New Guinea	12 – 16	New Zealand	L'Arène du Sud, Païta, New Caledonia

New Caledonia	30 – 10	Australia	L'Arène du Sud, Païta, New Caledonia

14 August 2019	Australia	23 – 5	Papua New Guinea	L'Arène du Sud, Païta, New Caledonia

American Samoa	21 – 24	New Zealand	L'Arène du Sud, Païta, New Caledonia

Fiji	7 – 44	New Caledonia	L'Arène du Sud, Païta, New Caledonia

15 August 2019	Fiji	11 – 11	Papua New Guinea	L'Arène du Sud, Païta, New Caledonia

New Zealand	9 – 22	Australia	L'Arène du Sud, Païta, New Caledonia

American Samoa	13 – 33	New Caledonia	L'Arène du Sud, Païta, New Caledonia

16 August 2019	American Samoa	23 – 34	Australia	L'Arène du Sud, Païta, New Caledonia

Fiji	13 – 20	New Zealand	L'Arène du Sud, Païta, New Caledonia

== Rankings ==
Classification
1st place, gold medalist(s)	New Caledonia
2nd place, silver medalist(s)	Australia
3rd place, bronze medalist(s)	New Zealand
4	American Samoa
5	Papua New Guinea
6	Fiji
