= 2014 Oceania Women's Handball Challenge Trophy =

The 2014 Women's Oceania Handball Challenge Trophy was held at the ASB Sports Centre in Wellington, New Zealand between December 8 and 13, 2014.

The competition participants were defending champions Australia, host New Zealand, regulars Vanuatu and Cook Islands. New to the championship were American Samoa, New Caledonia, and Samoa.

Hosts New Zealand were the winner upsetting Australia in the final and going through undefeated. Third was New Caledonia over Vanuatu. Fifth was Cook Islands, then Samoa and American Samoa.

== Women's results ==
=== Pool A ===
Team	Pld	W	D	L	GF	GA	GD	Pts
New Zealand	2	2	0	0	47	12	+35	4
Vanuatu	2	1	0	1	21	32	−11	2
American Samoa	2	0	0	2	18	42	−24	0

8 December 2014	New Zealand	27 – 6	American Samoa	ASB Sports Centre, Wellington, New Zealand

9 December 2014	New Zealand	20 – 6	Vanuatu	ASB Sports Centre, Wellington, New Zealand

10 December 2014	American Samoa	12 – 15	Vanuatu	ASB Sports Centre, Wellington, New Zealand

=== Pool B ===
Team	Pld	W	D	L	GF	GA	GD	Pts
Australia	3	3	0	0	66	39	+27	6
New Caledonia	3	2	0	1	76	52	+24	4
Cook Islands	3	1	0	2	55	62	−7	2
Samoa	3	0	0	3	35	83	−48	0

8 December 2014	New Caledonia	16 – 21	Australia	ASB Sports Centre, Wellington, New Zealand

Samoa	10 – 30	Cook Islands	ASB Sports Centre, Wellington, New Zealand

9 December 2014	Australia	23 – 12	Cook Islands	ASB Sports Centre, Wellington, New Zealand

New Caledonia	31 – 14	Samoa	ASB Sports Centre, Wellington, New Zealand

10 December 2014	Australia	22 – 11	Samoa	ASB Sports Centre, Wellington, New Zealand

New Caledonia	29 – 17	Cook Islands	ASB Sports Centre, Wellington, New Zealand

=== 5th to 7th place ===
Each team to play each other once. Round robin rounds and additional games to finalize positions.

Team	Pld	W	D	L	GF	GA	GD	Pts
Cook Islands	2	2	0	0	65	26	+39	4
Samoa	2	1	0	1	20	30	−10	2
American Samoa	2	0	0	2	45	16	+29	0

8 December 2014	Samoa	10 – 30	Cook Islands	ASB Sports Centre, Wellington, New Zealand

12 December 2014	Cook Islands	35 – 16	American Samoa	ASB Sports Centre, Wellington, New Zealand

13 December 2014	Samoa	10 – 0 (forfeit)	American Samoa	ASB Sports Centre, Wellington, New Zealand

=== Semi finals ===
12 December 2014	New Caledonia	11 – 13	New Zealand	ASB Sports Centre, Wellington, New Zealand

Vanuatu	11 – 28	Australia	ASB Sports Centre, Wellington, New Zealand

=== Third place game ===
13 December 2014	Vanuatu	12 – 30	New Caledonia	ASB Sports Centre, Wellington, New Zealand

=== Final ===
13 December 2014	New Zealand	11 – 7	Australia	ASB Sports Centre, Wellington, New Zealand; Referees: Robert Ridley, Richard Ridley (AUS)

== Rankings ==
Classification
1st place, gold medalist(s)	New Zealand
2nd place, silver medalist(s)	Australia
3rd place, bronze medalist(s)	New Caledonia
4	Vanuatu
5	Cook Islands
6	Samoa
7	American Samoa
