= Time in Kosovo =

- Time zone: Central European Time
- Initials: CET
- UTC offset: UTC+01:00
- Time notation: 24 hour clock

Daylight saving time
- Name: Central European Summer Time
- Initials: CEST
- UTC offset: UTC+02:00
- Start: Last Sunday in March (02:00 CET)
- End: Last Sunday in October (03:00 CEST)

tz database
- None

In Kosovo, the standard time is Central European Time (CET; UTC+01:00). Daylight saving time, which is one hour ahead, is observed from the last Sunday in March (02:00 CET) to the last Sunday in October (03:00 CEST).

As Kosovo is not an internationally recognized by some states, although it is recognized by more than 100 states in the world, it is not granted a zone.tab entry on the IANA time zone database.

== Time notation ==
The 24-hour clock is used.

== See also ==
- Time in Europe
- Time in Serbia
- Time in Albania
- Time in Bosnia and Herzegovina
