= Oceania Youth Handball Championship =

International youth handball competition

The Oceania Youth Handball Championship is an Under 19 for Boys and Under 18 for Girls handball tournament organised by the Oceania Continent Handball Federation. The winners of these competition qualify for the IHF Men's Youth World Championship and IHF Women's Youth World Championship respectively.

For the boys there have only been two tournaments held. In 2007 Australia won and they proceeded to the 2007 Men's Youth World Handball Championship in Bahrain finishing 16th (last). Australia traveled to Tahiti for the second installment. The hosts won two of the three games to claim the title. The third was won by New Zealand in April 2011. They proceeded to the 2011 Men's Youth World Handball Championship in Argentina finishing 20th (last). The Cook Islands represented Oceania 2010 World Youth Games in Singapore finishing 6th (last). New Zealand and Australia did not take up their option. After a lengthy lay off, the Championship had its third title in New Caledonia 2018. New Zealand retained their title.

The girls first tournament was in 2009 in New Caledonia. The hosts beat Australia four games to nil but Australia did represent Oceania in the 2010 World Youth Games in Singapore. The second tournament, a decade later, was again in New Caledonia where the hosts retained their title.

== Champions ==
=== Men's competition ===
Year	Venue	Final					
Year	Venue	Winner	Score	Runner-up	3rd Place	Score	4th Place
2007	Australia	Australia	Unknown	New Zealand	only 2 teams		
2009	Tahiti	French Polynesia	Unknown	Australia	only 2 teams		
2011	Cook Islands	New Zealand	Unknown	Australia	Cook Islands	only 3 teams	
2016	Cook Islands	Cancelled - tournament was to be played in December 2016					
2018	New Caledonia	New Zealand	round robin	New Caledonia	Australia	round robin	Fiji
2020	Tahiti	Postponed due to COVID-19 pandemic					
2022	Cook Islands	French Polynesia	round robin	New Zealand	New Caledonia	round robin	Australia
2024	Tahiti	New Caledonia	47 - 27	New Zealand	Australia	39 - 31	French Polynesia

==== Participating nations ====
Nation	(Australia) 2007	(French Polynesia) 2009	(Cook Islands) 2011	(New Caledonia) 2018	(Cook Islands) 2022	(French Polynesia) 2024	Years
American Samoa	-	-	-	-	-	6th	1
Australia	1st	2nd	2nd	3rd	4th	3rd	6
Cook Islands	-	-	3rd	6th	5th	5th	4
Fiji	-	-	-	4th	-	-	1
French Polynesia	-	1st	-	-	1st	4th	3
New Caledonia	-	-	-	2nd	3rd	1st	3
New Zealand	2nd	-	1st	1st	2nd	2nd	5
Papua New Guinea	-	-	-	5th	-	-	1
Tonga	-	-	-	-	6th	-	1

=== Women's competition ===
Year	Venue	Final					
Year	Venue	Winner	Score	Runner-up	3rd Place	Score	4th Place
2009	New Caledonia	New Caledonia	unknown	Australia	only two teams		
2016	Cook Islands	Cancelled - tournament was to be played in December 2016					
2019	New Caledonia	New Caledonia	round robin	New Zealand	French Polynesia	round robin	Australia
2023	New Caledonia	New Caledonia	round robin	French Polynesia	New Zealand	only three teams	

==== Participating nations ====
Nation	(New Caledonia) 2009	(New Caledonia) 2019	(New Caledonia) 2023	Years
Australia	2nd	4th	-	2
Fiji	-	6th	-	1
French Polynesia	-	3rd	2nd	2
New Caledonia	1st	1st	1st	3
New Zealand	-	2nd	3rd	2
Papua New Guinea	-	5th	-	1
