= 2019 IHF Inter-Continental Trophy =

Tournament details
- Host country: Kosovo
- Venue(s): 2 (in 1 host city)
- Dates: 10–14 April
- Teams: 6 (from 6 confederations)

The 2019 IHF Inter-Continental Trophy was the fourth edition of the competition held in Pristina, Kosovo from 10 to 14 April 2019. It featured a men's youth (U-19) tournament and a men's junior (U-21) tournament.

== Junior tournament ==
=== Qualified teams ===
Confederation	Dates	Host	Vacancies	Qualified
Oceania (OCHF)	10–15 June 2018	(New Caledonia) Païta	1	Australia
Africa (CAHB)	8–12 August 2018	(Rwanda) Kigali	1	Nigeria
Europe (EHF)	23–28 October 2018	(Kosovo) Pristina	1	Kosovo
South and Central America (SCAHC)	31 October – 4 November 2018	(Paraguay) Asunción	1	Paraguay
Asia (AHF)	5–9 November 2018	(Thailand) Ubon Ratchathani	1	Chinese Taipei
North America & the Caribbean (NACHC)	17–20 November 2018	(United States) West Dundee	1	United States

=== Preliminary round ===
==== Group A ====
Pos	Team	Pld	W	D	L	GF	GA	GD	Pts	Qualification
1	Kosovo (H)	2	2	0	0	65	44	+21	4	Semifinals
2	Chinese Taipei	2	1	0	1	53	60	−7	2	Semifinals
3	Nigeria	2	0	0	2	50	64	−14	0	

Source: IHF
Rules for classification: 1) points; 2) head-to-head points; 3) head-to-head goal difference; 4) head-to-head number of goals scored; 5) goal difference.
(H) Hosts

10 April 2019; 15:00	Kosovo	31–23	Chinese Taipei	Palace of Youth and Sports, Pristina; Attendance: 400; Referees: Ershov, Pavliukov (RUS)
10 April 2019; 15:00	Muqolli, Tahirukaj 7	(16–10)	three players 5	Palace of Youth and Sports, Pristina; Attendance: 400; Referees: Ershov, Pavliukov (RUS)
10 April 2019; 15:00	3× (yellow card) 1× (suspension)	Report	1× (yellow card) 4× (suspension)	Palace of Youth and Sports, Pristina; Attendance: 400; Referees: Ershov, Pavliukov (RUS)

11 April 2019; 17:00	Chinese Taipei	30–29	Nigeria	Palace of Youth and Sports, Pristina; Attendance: 100; Referees: Hermann, Madsen (DEN)
11 April 2019; 17:00	Ting 8	(16–14)	Anas 9	Palace of Youth and Sports, Pristina; Attendance: 100; Referees: Hermann, Madsen (DEN)
11 April 2019; 17:00	5× (suspension) 1× (red card)	Report	6× (suspension)	Palace of Youth and Sports, Pristina; Attendance: 100; Referees: Hermann, Madsen (DEN)

12 April 2019; 19:00	Nigeria	21–34	Kosovo	Palace of Youth and Sports, Pristina; Attendance: 350; Referees: Hermann, Madsen (DEN)
12 April 2019; 19:00	Mohammed 4	(11–22)	Tahirukaj 9	Palace of Youth and Sports, Pristina; Attendance: 350; Referees: Hermann, Madsen (DEN)
12 April 2019; 19:00	3× (suspension)	Report	2× (yellow card) 6× (suspension)	Palace of Youth and Sports, Pristina; Attendance: 350; Referees: Hermann, Madsen (DEN)

==== Group B ====
Pos	Team	Pld	W	D	L	GF	GA	GD	Pts	Qualification
1	United States	2	2	0	0	59	39	+20	4	Semifinals
2	Paraguay	2	1	0	1	51	47	+4	2	Semifinals
3	Australia	2	0	0	2	39	63	−24	0	

Source: IHF
Rules for classification: 1) points; 2) head-to-head points; 3) head-to-head goal difference; 4) head-to-head number of goals scored; 5) goal difference.

10 April 2019; 13:00	United States	31–20	Australia	Palace of Youth and Sports, Pristina; Attendance: 50; Referees: Hermann, Madsen (DEN)
10 April 2019; 13:00	Amitovic, Bengozi 6	(14–9)	McCourt 6	Palace of Youth and Sports, Pristina; Attendance: 50; Referees: Hermann, Madsen (DEN)
10 April 2019; 13:00	4× (suspension)	Report	1× (yellow card) 6× (suspension)	Palace of Youth and Sports, Pristina; Attendance: 50; Referees: Hermann, Madsen (DEN)

11 April 2019; 15:00	Australia	19–32	Paraguay	Palace of Youth and Sports, Pristina; Attendance: 50; Referees: Da Silva, Magalhães (BRA)
11 April 2019; 15:00	Ljunberg 5	(7–15)	Fiore 8	Palace of Youth and Sports, Pristina; Attendance: 50; Referees: Da Silva, Magalhães (BRA)
11 April 2019; 15:00	1× (yellow card) 5× (suspension)	Report	1× (yellow card) 4× (suspension)	Palace of Youth and Sports, Pristina; Attendance: 50; Referees: Da Silva, Magalhães (BRA)

12 April 2019; 15:00	Paraguay	19–28	United States	Palace of Youth and Sports, Pristina; Attendance: 50; Referees: Ershov, Pavliukov (RUS)
12 April 2019; 15:00	Rojas 6	(9–16)	Amitovic 7	Palace of Youth and Sports, Pristina; Attendance: 50; Referees: Ershov, Pavliukov (RUS)
12 April 2019; 15:00	3× (yellow card) 8× (suspension)	Report	3× (suspension) 1× (red card)	Palace of Youth and Sports, Pristina; Attendance: 50; Referees: Ershov, Pavliukov (RUS)

=== Knockout round ===
==== Bracket ====
Semi-finals
13 April 2019
Kosovo	36
Paraguay	17
13 April 2019
United States	36
Chinese Taipei	41

Final
14 April 2019
Kosovo	30
Chinese Taipei	26
Third place
14 April 2019
Paraguay	34
United States (OT)	36

==== Semifinals ====
13 April 2019; 15:00	United States	36–41	Chinese Taipei	Palace of Youth and Sports, Pristina; Referees: Hermann, Madsen (DEN)
13 April 2019; 15:00	Bengozi, Amitovic 10	(14–21)	Jou 9	Palace of Youth and Sports, Pristina; Referees: Hermann, Madsen (DEN)
13 April 2019; 15:00	2× (yellow card) 3× (suspension)	Report	1× (yellow card) 5× (suspension)	Palace of Youth and Sports, Pristina; Referees: Hermann, Madsen (DEN)

13 April 2019; 19:00	Kosovo	36–27	Paraguay	Palace of Youth and Sports, Pristina; Attendance: 350; Referees: Da Silva, Magalhães (BRA)
13 April 2019; 19:00	Shabani 7	(19–14)	Melgarejo 10	Palace of Youth and Sports, Pristina; Attendance: 350; Referees: Da Silva, Magalhães (BRA)
13 April 2019; 19:00	1× (yellow card) 4× (suspension)	Report	3× (suspension)	Palace of Youth and Sports, Pristina; Attendance: 350; Referees: Da Silva, Magalhães (BRA)

==== Fifth place game ====
13 April 2019; 16:00	Nigeria	37–21	Australia	1 Tetori, Pristina; Attendance: 45; Referees: Liu, Xu (CHN)
13 April 2019; 16:00	Ataboh 8	(20–9)	Ljunberg 4	1 Tetori, Pristina; Attendance: 45; Referees: Liu, Xu (CHN)
13 April 2019; 16:00	1× (yellow card) 3× (suspension)	Report	1× (yellow card) 1× (suspension)	1 Tetori, Pristina; Attendance: 45; Referees: Liu, Xu (CHN)

==== Third place game ====
14 April 2019
14:00
Paraguay
34–36 (ET)
United States
Palace of Youth and Sports, Pristina
Attendance: 50
Referees: Moussa, Shawky (EGY)
Giménez 7
(12–17)
Bengozi 11
2× (yellow card) 4× (suspension)
Report
3× (yellow card) 5× (suspension) 1× (red card)

FT: 30–30 ET: 4–6

==== Final ====
14 April 2019; 18:00	Kosovo	30–26	Chinese Taipei	Palace of Youth and Sports, Pristina; Attendance: 900; Referees: Hermann, Madsen (DEN)
14 April 2019; 18:00	Tahirukaj 9	(12–10)	Chen S., Li 7	Palace of Youth and Sports, Pristina; Attendance: 900; Referees: Hermann, Madsen (DEN)
14 April 2019; 18:00	2× (yellow card) 7× (suspension)	Report	2× (suspension)	Palace of Youth and Sports, Pristina; Attendance: 900; Referees: Hermann, Madsen (DEN)

=== Final ranking ===
Rank	Team
1	Kosovo
2	Chinese Taipei
3	United States
4	Paraguay
5	Nigeria
6	Australia

Team qualified to the 2019 Men's Junior World Handball Championship

== Youth tournament ==
=== Qualified teams ===
Confederation	Dates	Host	Vacancies	Qualified
Oceania (OCHF)	10–15 June 2018	(New Caledonia) Païta	1	New Zealand
Africa (CAHB)	8–12 August 2018	(Rwanda) Kigali	1	Nigeria
Europe (EHF)	23–28 October 2018	(Kosovo) Pristina	1	Kosovo
South and Central America (SCAHC)	31 October – 4 November 2018	(Paraguay) Asunción	1	Paraguay
Asia (AHF)	5–9 November 2018	(Thailand) Ubon Ratchathani	1	Chinese Taipei
North America & the Caribbean (NACHC)	17–20 November 2018	(United States) West Dundee	1	Canada

=== Preliminary round ===
==== Group A ====
Pos	Team	Pld	W	D	L	GF	GA	GD	Pts	Qualification
1	Chinese Taipei	2	2	0	0	74	40	+34	4	Semifinals
2	Nigeria	2	1	0	1	49	54	−5	2	Semifinals
3	Paraguay	2	0	0	2	40	69	−29	0	

Source: IHF
Rules for classification: 1) points; 2) head-to-head points; 3) head-to-head goal difference; 4) head-to-head number of goals scored; 5) goal difference.

10 April 2019; 17:00	Paraguay	22–38	Chinese Taipei	Palace of Youth and Sports, Pristina; Attendance: 30; Referees: Magalhães, Da Silva (BRA)
10 April 2019; 17:00	Zalazar 8	(11–21)	Yang 7	Palace of Youth and Sports, Pristina; Attendance: 30; Referees: Magalhães, Da Silva (BRA)
10 April 2019; 17:00	1× (yellow card) 2× (suspension)	Report	3× (yellow card) 5× (suspension)	Palace of Youth and Sports, Pristina; Attendance: 30; Referees: Magalhães, Da Silva (BRA)

11 April 2019; 19:00	Chinese Taipei	36–18	Nigeria	1 Tetori, Pristina; Attendance: 50; Referees: Ershov, Pavliukov (RUS)
11 April 2019; 19:00	Tseng 9	(18–8)	Salami 6	1 Tetori, Pristina; Attendance: 50; Referees: Ershov, Pavliukov (RUS)
11 April 2019; 19:00	2× (yellow card) 3× (suspension)	Report	1× (yellow card) 10× (suspension) 1× (red card)	1 Tetori, Pristina; Attendance: 50; Referees: Ershov, Pavliukov (RUS)

12 April 2019; 13:00	Nigeria	31–18	Paraguay	Palace of Youth and Sports, Pristina; Attendance: 40; Referees: Liu, Xu (CHN)
12 April 2019; 13:00	three players 7	(18–7)	Céspedes 5	Palace of Youth and Sports, Pristina; Attendance: 40; Referees: Liu, Xu (CHN)
12 April 2019; 13:00	3× (yellow card) 2× (suspension)	Report	2× (yellow card) 4× (suspension)	Palace of Youth and Sports, Pristina; Attendance: 40; Referees: Liu, Xu (CHN)

==== Group B ====
Pos	Team	Pld	W	D	L	GF	GA	GD	Pts	Qualification
1	Canada	2	2	0	0	72	41	+31	4	Semifinals
2	Kosovo (H)	2	1	0	1	72	49	+23	2	Semifinals
3	New Zealand	2	0	0	2	24	78	−54	0	

Source: IHF
Rules for classification: 1) points; 2) head-to-head points; 3) head-to-head goal difference; 4) head-to-head number of goals scored; 5) goal difference.
(H) Hosts

10 April 2019; 14:00	New Zealand	10–37	Canada	1 Tetori, Pristina; Attendance: 50; Referees: Shawky, Moussa (EGY)
10 April 2019; 14:00	Ireland 4	(4–20)	Barri 9	1 Tetori, Pristina; Attendance: 50; Referees: Shawky, Moussa (EGY)
10 April 2019; 14:00	2× (yellow card) 6× (suspension)	Report	4× (suspension)	1 Tetori, Pristina; Attendance: 50; Referees: Shawky, Moussa (EGY)

11 April 2019; 13:00	Kosovo	41–14	New Zealand	Palace of Youth and Sports, Pristina; Attendance: 60; Referees: Liu, Xu (China)
11 April 2019; 13:00	Isufi 8	(18–5)	Ireland, Smith 5	Palace of Youth and Sports, Pristina; Attendance: 60; Referees: Liu, Xu (China)
11 April 2019; 13:00	3× (yellow card) 4× (suspension)	Report	2× (yellow card) 1× (suspension)	Palace of Youth and Sports, Pristina; Attendance: 60; Referees: Liu, Xu (China)

12 April 2019; 17:00	Canada	35–31	Kosovo	Palace of Youth and Sports, Pristina; Attendance: 100; Referees: Moussa, Shawky (EGY)
12 April 2019; 17:00	Ouallouche 8	(16–9)	Muqoli 8	Palace of Youth and Sports, Pristina; Attendance: 100; Referees: Moussa, Shawky (EGY)
12 April 2019; 17:00	1× (yellow card) 3× (suspension)	Report	2× (yellow card) 9× (suspension)	Palace of Youth and Sports, Pristina; Attendance: 100; Referees: Moussa, Shawky (EGY)

=== Knockout round ===
==== Bracket ====
Semi-finals
13 April
Chinese Taipei	35
Kosovo	26
13 April
Canada	25
Nigeria	32

Final
14 April
Chinese Taipei	27
Nigeria	26
Third place
14 April
Kosovo	32
Canada	26

==== Semifinals ====
13 April 2019; 13:00	Canada	25–32	Nigeria	Palace of Youth and Sports, Pristina; Attendance: 50; Referees: Moussa, Shawky (EGY)
13 April 2019; 13:00	Ouallouche 8	(10–18)	Salami 11	Palace of Youth and Sports, Pristina; Attendance: 50; Referees: Moussa, Shawky (EGY)
13 April 2019; 13:00	1× (yellow card) 3× (suspension)	Report	2× (yellow card) 8× (suspension)	Palace of Youth and Sports, Pristina; Attendance: 50; Referees: Moussa, Shawky (EGY)

13 April 2019; 17:00	Chinese Taipei	35–26	Kosovo	Palace of Youth and Sports, Pristina; Attendance: 60; Referees: Ershov, Pavliukov (RUS)
13 April 2019; 17:00	Yang 9	(17–13)	Muqoli 10	Palace of Youth and Sports, Pristina; Attendance: 60; Referees: Ershov, Pavliukov (RUS)
13 April 2019; 17:00	3× (yellow card) 8× (suspension) 1× (red card)	Report	3× (yellow card) 7× (suspension)	Palace of Youth and Sports, Pristina; Attendance: 60; Referees: Ershov, Pavliukov (RUS)

==== Fifth place game ====
13 April 2019; 13:00	Paraguay	23–20	New Zealand	1 Tetori, Pristina; Attendance: 25; Referees: Liu, Xu (CHN)
13 April 2019; 13:00	Céspedes, Greco 5	(14–9)	Brookes 8	1 Tetori, Pristina; Attendance: 25; Referees: Liu, Xu (CHN)
13 April 2019; 13:00	2× (yellow card) 1× (suspension)	Report	1× (suspension)	1 Tetori, Pristina; Attendance: 25; Referees: Liu, Xu (CHN)

==== Third place game ====
14 April 2019; 12:00	Kosovo	32–26	Canada	Palace of Youth and Sports, Pristina; Attendance: 60; Referees: Liu, Xu (CHN)
14 April 2019; 12:00	Muqoli 8	(16–9)	Ouallouche 9	Palace of Youth and Sports, Pristina; Attendance: 60; Referees: Liu, Xu (CHN)
14 April 2019; 12:00	3× (yellow card) 3× (suspension)	Report	1× (yellow card) 5× (suspension)	Palace of Youth and Sports, Pristina; Attendance: 60; Referees: Liu, Xu (CHN)

==== Final ====
14 April 2019; 16:00	Chinese Taipei	27–26	Nigeria	Palace of Youth and Sports, Pristina; Attendance: 400; Referees: Da Silva, Magalhaes (BRA)
14 April 2019; 16:00	Lin 10	(14–11)	Yusuf 12	Palace of Youth and Sports, Pristina; Attendance: 400; Referees: Da Silva, Magalhaes (BRA)
14 April 2019; 16:00	2× (yellow card) 3× (suspension)	Report	1× (yellow card) 8× (suspension)	Palace of Youth and Sports, Pristina; Attendance: 400; Referees: Da Silva, Magalhaes (BRA)

=== Final ranking ===
Rank	Team
1	Chinese Taipei
2	Nigeria
3	Kosovo
4	Canada
5	Paraguay
6	New Zealand
