= New Zealand men's national junior handball team =

New Zealand

Information
- Association: New Zealand Handball Federation

Colours
1st	2nd

Results

IHF U-21 World Championship
- Appearances: 1 (First in 1999)
- Best result: 17th

Oceania Handball Challenge Trophy
- Appearances: 7 (First in 1998)
- Best result: 2nd (three times)
- Last updated on 9 August 2017.

The New Zealand national junior handball team is the national under 21 men's handball team of New Zealand and is controlled by the New Zealand Handball Federation.

== Results ==
=== World Championship record ===
Year	Position	GP	W	D	L	GS	GA	GD
Qatar 1999	17th	7	0	0	7	68	450	-382
Total	0 Titles	7	0	0	7	68	450	-382

=== Oceania Nations Cup record ===
Year	Round	Position	GP	W	D	L	GS	GA	GD
1998	Final	2nd	2	0	0	2	46	72	-26
2010	Final	2nd	7	5	0	2	233	127	106
2012	Final	2nd	5	3	1	1	177	110	67
2014	Final	4th	5	3	0	2	166	128	38
2017	Final	4th	5	2	0	3	151	130	21
2018	Final	4th	5	2	0	3	114	106	8
2022	Final	3rd	4	2	0	2	112	91	21
Total	no titles	7/7	33	17	1	15	999	762	235
