= Handball at the 2010 Summer Youth Olympics – Boys' tournament =

Handball at the 2010 Summer Youth Olympics took place at the Suntec Hall 602 in Singapore.

== Medalists ==
Gold	Silver	Bronze
Egypt	South Korea	France

== Participating teams ==
Group A

- Cook Islands
- France
- South Korea

Group B

- Brazil
- Egypt
- Singapore

== Preliminary round ==
Team advances to Semifinals
Team competes in 5th-6th placement matches

=== Group A ===
Team	Pld	W	D	L	GF	GA	GD	Pts
France	2	2	0	0	97	40	+57	4
South Korea	2	1	0	1	106	43	+63	2
Cook Islands	2	0	0	2	8	128	–120	0

August 20, 2010; 18:30	Cook Islands	4–58	France	Suntec Hall 602; Referees: Krichene, Makhlouf (Tunisia)
August 20, 2010; 18:30	Robati 2	(2–33)	Bataille 13	Suntec Hall 602; Referees: Krichene, Makhlouf (Tunisia)
August 20, 2010; 18:30	3× (yellow card) 4× (suspension) 2× (red card)	Report	3× (yellow card)	Suntec Hall 602; Referees: Krichene, Makhlouf (Tunisia)

August 21, 2010; 18:30	South Korea	70–4	Cook Islands	Suntec Hall 602; Referees: da Costa, da Costa (Brazil)
August 21, 2010; 18:30	Jang 12	(33–1)	Kermode 2	Suntec Hall 602; Referees: da Costa, da Costa (Brazil)
August 21, 2010; 18:30	3× (yellow card) 3× (suspension)	Report	3× (yellow card) 4× (suspension)	Suntec Hall 602; Referees: da Costa, da Costa (Brazil)

August 22, 2010; 18:30	France	39–36	South Korea	Suntec Hall 602; Referees: Schaller, Wutzler (Germany)
August 22, 2010; 18:30	Descat 7	(18–17)	Lee Hy. 16	Suntec Hall 602; Referees: Schaller, Wutzler (Germany)
August 22, 2010; 18:30	3× (yellow card) 5× (suspension) 1× (red card)	Report	2× (yellow card) 3× (suspension)	Suntec Hall 602; Referees: Schaller, Wutzler (Germany)

=== Group B ===
Team	Pld	W	D	L	GF	GA	GD	Pts
Brazil	2	1	1	0	84	38	+46	3
Egypt	2	1	1	0	81	38	+43	3
Singapore	2	0	0	2	14	103	–89	0

August 20, 2010; 20:15	Singapore	7–50	Egypt	Suntec Hall 602; Referees: Hizaki, Ikebuchi (Japan)
August 20, 2010; 20:15	Koh 3	(2–21)	Abdelrhim 10	Suntec Hall 602; Referees: Hizaki, Ikebuchi (Japan)
August 20, 2010; 20:15	3× (yellow card) 3× (suspension)	Report	3× (yellow card) 1× (suspension)	Suntec Hall 602; Referees: Hizaki, Ikebuchi (Japan)

August 21, 2010; 20:15	Brazil	53–7	Singapore	Suntec Hall 602; Referees: Eliasson, Gudjonsson (Iceland)
August 21, 2010; 20:15	Luz 9	(22–3)	Tay 3	Suntec Hall 602; Referees: Eliasson, Gudjonsson (Iceland)
August 21, 2010; 20:15	2× (yellow card) 1× (suspension)	Report	3× (yellow card) 1× (suspension)	Suntec Hall 602; Referees: Eliasson, Gudjonsson (Iceland)

August 22, 2010; 20:15	Egypt	31–31	Brazil	Suntec Hall 602; Referees: Bonaventura, Bonaventura (France)
August 22, 2010; 20:15	Abdelrhim 9	(18–17)	Dutra 10	Suntec Hall 602; Referees: Bonaventura, Bonaventura (France)
August 22, 2010; 20:15	1× (yellow card) 5× (suspension) 1× (red card)	Report	3× (yellow card) 3× (suspension)	Suntec Hall 602; Referees: Bonaventura, Bonaventura (France)

== Medal round ==
=== Semifinals ===
August 24, 2010; 18:00	France	21–22	Egypt	Suntec Hall 602; Referees: da Costa, da Costa (Brazil)
August 24, 2010; 18:00	Descat 6	(11–12)	Bechir 5	Suntec Hall 602; Referees: da Costa, da Costa (Brazil)
August 24, 2010; 18:00	3× (yellow card) 5× (suspension)	Report	4× (yellow card) 3× (suspension) 1× (red card)	Suntec Hall 602; Referees: da Costa, da Costa (Brazil)

August 24, 2010; 20:00	South Korea	27–22	Brazil	Suntec Hall 602; Referees: Krichene, Makhlouf (Tunisia)
August 24, 2010; 20:00	Lee Hy. 8	(13–10)	Malburg 9	Suntec Hall 602; Referees: Krichene, Makhlouf (Tunisia)
August 24, 2010; 20:00	3× (yellow card)	Report	3× (yellow card) 3× (suspension)	Suntec Hall 602; Referees: Krichene, Makhlouf (Tunisia)

=== 5th place playoffs ===
==== 1st leg ====
August 23, 2010; 20:00	Cook Islands	20–27	Singapore	Suntec Hall 602; Referees: Schaller, Wutzler (Germany)
August 23, 2010; 20:00	Mataora 6	(10–15)	Pillay 8	Suntec Hall 602; Referees: Schaller, Wutzler (Germany)
August 23, 2010; 20:00	2× (yellow card)	Report	2× (yellow card)	Suntec Hall 602; Referees: Schaller, Wutzler (Germany)

==== 2nd leg ====
August 24, 2010; 15:00	Singapore	32–18	Cook Islands	Suntec Hall 602; Referees: Hizaki, Ikebuchi (Japan)
August 24, 2010; 15:00	Koh 8	(17–8)	three players 4	Suntec Hall 602; Referees: Hizaki, Ikebuchi (Japan)
August 24, 2010; 15:00	2× (yellow card) 1× (suspension)	Report	2× (yellow card) 6× (suspension)	Suntec Hall 602; Referees: Hizaki, Ikebuchi (Japan)

Singapore win 59–38 on aggregagate

=== Bronze medal match ===
August 25, 2010; 15:00	France	40–27	Brazil	Suntec Hall 602; Referees: Schaller, Wutzler (Germany)
August 25, 2010; 15:00	Derot 9	(23–12)	Malburg 7	Suntec Hall 602; Referees: Schaller, Wutzler (Germany)
August 25, 2010; 15:00	3× (yellow card) 6× (suspension)	Report	3× (yellow card) 3× (suspension)	Suntec Hall 602; Referees: Schaller, Wutzler (Germany)

=== Final ===
August 25, 2010; 20:00	Egypt	35–25	South Korea	Suntec Hall 602; Referees: Bonaventura, Bonaventura (France)
August 25, 2010; 20:00	Mohsen 15	(13–13)	Lee Hy. 11	Suntec Hall 602; Referees: Bonaventura, Bonaventura (France)
August 25, 2010; 20:00	3× (yellow card) 3× (suspension)	Report	3× (yellow card) 1× (suspension)	Suntec Hall 602; Referees: Bonaventura, Bonaventura (France)
