= 1997 Oceania Junior Women's Handball Championship =

The 1997 Oceania Junior Women's Handball Championship, was the first official competition for junior women's national handball teams from Oceania. It was held from December 11–12, 1998 in Melbourne, Victoria, Australia. It also acted as the qualifying competition for the 1997 IHF Women's Junior World Championship, securing one Vacancy for the World Championship.

Australia and New Zealand played a two-game series to determine the winner. Australia was the winner but decided to defer its entry to the World Cup and New Zealand also deferred.

== Overview ==
Team 1	Agg.	Team 2	1st leg	2nd leg
Australia	30-23	New Zealand	17-12	13-11
