= 2012 Oceania Men's Handball Challenge Trophy =

The 2012 Men's Oceania Handball Challenge Trophy was held in Apia, Samoa between October 1 and 6, 2012.

The competition participants were defending champions Australia, New Zealand, Vanuatu and Cook Islands and hosts Samoa.

The winners were Australia, going through undefeated. Second was New Zealand then Vanuatu, Cook Islands and Samoa.

== Men's results ==
=== Group stage ===
Team	Pld	W	D	L	GF	GA	GD	Pts
Australia	4	3	1	0	148	67	+81	7
New Zealand	4	3	1	0	149	81	+68	7
Vanuatu	4	2	0	2	81	113	−32	4
Cook Islands	4	1	0	3	88	145	−57	2
Samoa	4	0	0	4	82	142	−60	0

1 October 2012	Australia	49 – 20	Cook Islands	Apia, Samoa

Samoa	19 – 29	Vanuatu	Apia, Samoa

2 October 2012	Australia	37 – 2	Vanuatu	Apia, Samoa

New Zealand	47 – 14	Cook Islands	Apia, Samoa

3 October 2012	New Zealand	43 – 22	Samoa	Apia, Samoa

Cook Islands	22 – 29	Vanuatu	Apia, Samoa

4 October 2012	New Zealand	35 – 21	Vanuatu	Apia, Samoa

Samoa	21 – 38	Australia	Apia, Samoa

5 October 2012	Cook Islands	32 – 20	Samoa	Apia, Samoa

New Zealand	24 – 24	Australia	Apia, Samoa

=== Final ===
6 October 2012	New Zealand	28 – 29	Australia	Apia, Samoa

== Rankings ==
Classification
1st place, gold medalist(s)	Australia
2nd place, silver medalist(s)	New Zealand
3rd place, bronze medalist(s)	Vanuatu
4	Cook Islands
5	Samoa
