= 2010 Oceania Men's Handball Challenge Trophy =

Handball tournament held in Australia

The 2010 Men's Oceania Handball Challenge Trophy was held in Ipswich, Queensland, Australia between December 7 and 17, 2010.

The competition participants were defending champions from 1998 and host Australia, and 1998 runners up New Zealand. New to the championship were Vanuatu, Solomon Islands, and Samoa. Vanuatu arrived late due to Visa problems and had to forfeit their first two games.

Hosts Australia were the winners and undefeated all tournament beating New Zealand in the final. Third was Vanuatu over Cook Islands. Fifth was Samoa over Solomon Islands.

== Results ==
=== Group results ===
| Team | Pld | W | D | L | GF | GA | GD | Pts |
|---|---|---|---|---|---|---|---|---|
| Australia | 5 | 5 | 0 | 0 | 168 | 62 | +106 | 10 |
| New Zealand | 5 | 4 | 0 | 1 | 169 | 72 | +97 | 8 |
| Cook Islands | 5 | 3 | 0 | 2 | 87 | 97 | −10 | 6 |
| Vanuatu | 5 | 2 | 0 | 3 | 77 | 87 | −10 | 4 |
| Samoa | 5 | 1 | 0 | 4 | 73 | 122 | −49 | 2 |
| Solomon Islands | 5 | 0 | 0 | 5 | 43 | 177 | −134 | 0 |

| 7 December 2010; 13:30 | Australia | 10 – 0 Forfeit | Vanuatu | Ipswich, Australia |

| 15:00 | New Zealand | 34 – 6 | Samoa | Ipswich, Australia |
| 15:00 | | (21 - 1) | | Ipswich, Australia |

| 16:30 | Cook Islands | 22 – 8 | Solomon Islands | Ipswich, Australia |
| 16:30 | | (12 - 4) | | Ipswich, Australia |

| 8 December 2010; 13:30 | Australia | 38 – 14 | Samoa | Ipswich, Australia |
| 8 December 2010; 13:30 | | (19 - 6) | | Ipswich, Australia |

| 15:00 | Cook Islands | 10 – 0 Forfeit | Vanuatu | Ipswich, Australia |

| 16:30 | New Zealand | 38 – 7 | Solomon Islands | Ipswich, Australia |
| 16:30 | | (23 - 4) | | Ipswich, Australia |

| 9 December 2010; 13:30 | Samoa | 18 – 8 | Solomon Islands | Ipswich, Australia |
| 9 December 2010; 13:30 | | (11 - 2) | | Ipswich, Australia |

| 15:00 | Australia | 38 – 14 | Cook Islands | Ipswich, Australia |
| 15:00 | | (17 - 9) | | Ipswich, Australia |

| 16:30 | New Zealand | 37 – 13 | Vanuatu | Ipswich, Australia |
| 16:30 | | (20 - 7) | | Ipswich, Australia |

| 10 December 2010; 13:30 | Samoa | 15 – 20 | Cook Islands | Ipswich, Australia |
| 10 December 2010; 13:30 | | (7 - 10) | | Ipswich, Australia |

| 15:00 | Vanuatu | 42 – 10 | Solomon Islands | Ipswich, Australia |
| 15:00 | | (24 - 4) | | Ipswich, Australia |

| 16:30 | Australia | 25 – 24 | New Zealand | Ipswich, Australia |
| 16:30 | | (9 - 14) | | Ipswich, Australia |

| 11 December 2010; 13:30 | New Zealand | 36 – 21 | Cook Islands | Ipswich, Australia |
| 11 December 2010; 13:30 | | (17 - 9) | | Ipswich, Australia |

| 15:00 | Australia | 57 – 10 | Solomon Islands | Ipswich, Australia |
| 15:00 | | (31 - 8) | | Ipswich, Australia |

| 16:30 | Vanuatu | 22 – 20 | Samoa | Ipswich, Australia |
| 16:30 | | (10 - 12) | | Ipswich, Australia |

=== Semi finals ===
| 12 December 2010; 14:00 | Cook Islands | 20 – 33 | New Zealand | Ipswich, Australia |
| 12 December 2010; 14:00 | | (11 - 16) | | Ipswich, Australia |

| 16:00 | Vanuatu | 25 – 44 | Australia | Ipswich, Australia |
| 16:00 | | (14 - 22) | | Ipswich, Australia |

=== Fifth place game ===
| 17 December 2010; 13:00 | Samoa | 24 – 10 | Solomon Islands | Ipswich, Australia |
| 17 December 2010; 13:00 | | (4 - 6) | | Ipswich, Australia |

=== Third place game ===
| 17 December 2010; 14:30 | Vanuatu | 26 – 20 | Cook Islands | Ipswich, Australia |
| 17 December 2010; 14:30 | | (14 - 14) | | Ipswich, Australia |

=== Final ===
| 17 December 2010; 16:00 | Australia | 35 – 31 | New Zealand | Ipswich, Australia |
| 17 December 2010; 16:00 | | (18 - 13) | | Ipswich, Australia |

== Rankings ==
Classification
| 1st place, gold medalist(s) | Australia |
| 2nd place, silver medalist(s) | New Zealand |
| 3rd place, bronze medalist(s) | Vanuatu |
| 4 | Cook Islands |
| 5 | Samoa |
| 6 | Solomon Islands |
