= Oceania Handball Challenge Trophy =

Junior handball competition

The Oceania Handball Challenge Trophy is a handball competition for Under 20-year-old men and Under 19-year-old women organised by the Oceania Continent Handball Federation. The winner of this competition qualifies for the Men's and Women's Junior World Handball Championship's.

== Champions ==
=== Men's competition ===
Year	Venue	Final					
Year	Venue	Winner	Score	Runner-up	3rd Place	Score	4th Place
1998	Mittagong, Australia	Australia	72 – 46 (2 legs)	New Zealand	only 2 teams		
2010	Brisbane, Australia	Australia	35 – 31	New Zealand	Vanuatu	26 – 20	Cook Islands
2012	Apia, Samoa	Australia	29 – 28	New Zealand	Vanuatu	group table	Cook Islands
2014	Wellington, New Zealand	French Polynesia	20 – 17	Australia	New Caledonia	29 – 25	New Zealand
2017	Rarotonga, Cook Islands	French Polynesia	round robin	New Caledonia	Australia	round robin	New Zealand
2018	New Caledonia	Australia	round robin	French Polynesia	New Caledonia	round robin	New Zealand
2020	Tahiti	Postponed due to COVID-19 pandemic					
2022	Cook Islands	Australia	round robin	New Caledonia	New Zealand	round robin	Cook Islands
2024	Tahiti	New Caledonia	32 - 27	New Zealand	French Polynesia	31 - 18	Australia

==== Participating nations ====
Nation	(Australia) 1998	(Australia) 2010	(Samoa) 2012	(New Zealand) 2014	(Cook Islands) 2017	(New Caledonia) 2018	(Cook Islands) 2022	(French Polynesia) 2024	Years
American Samoa	-	-	-	8th	-	-	-	-	1
Australia	1st	1st	1st	2nd	3rd	1st	1st	4th	8
Cook Islands	-	4th	4th	9th	6th	6th	4th	-	6
Fiji	-	-	-	-	-	5th	-	-	1
French Polynesia	-	-	-	1st	1st	2nd	-	3rd	4
New Caledonia	-	-	-	3rd	2nd	3rd	2nd	1st	5
New Zealand	2nd	2nd	2nd	4th	4th	4th	3rd	2nd	8
Papua New Guinea	-	-	-	6th	5th	-	-	-	2
Samoa	-	5th	5th	7th	-	-	-	-	3
Solomon Islands	-	6th	-	-	-	-	-	-	1
Tonga	-	-	-	-	-	-	5th	-	1
Vanuatu	-	3rd	3rd	5th	-	-	-	-	3

=== Women's competition ===
Year	Venue	Final					
Year	Venue	Winner	Score	Runner-up	3rd Place	Score	4th Place
1997	Melbourne, Australia	Australia	30 – 23 (2 legs)	New Zealand	only 2 teams		
2012	Apia, Samoa	Australia	22 – 15	New Zealand	Vanuatu	group table	Cook Islands
2014	Wellington, New Zealand	New Zealand	11 – 7	Australia	New Caledonia	32 – 12	Vanuatu
2019	New Caledonia	New Caledonia	round robin	Australia	New Zealand	round robin	American Samoa
2023	New Caledonia	New Caledonia	round robin	French Polynesia	New Zealand	round robin	Australia

==== Participating nations ====
Nation	(Australia) 1997	(Samoa) 2012	(New Zealand) 2014	(New Caledonia) 2019	(New Caledonia) 2023	Years
American Samoa	-	-	7th	4th	-	2
Australia	1st	1st	2nd	2nd	4th	5
Cook Islands	-	4th	5th	-	5th	3
Fiji	-	-	-	6th	-	1
French Polynesia	-	-	-	-	2nd	1
New Caledonia	-	-	3rd	1st	1st	3
New Zealand	2nd	2nd	1st	3rd	3rd	5
Papua New Guinea	-	-	-	5th	-	1
Samoa	-	5th	6th	-	-	2
Vanuatu	-	3rd	4th	-	-	2
