= United States men's national junior handball team =

United States

Information
- Association: USA Team Handball
- Coach: Danilo Rojevic
- Captain: Maksim Tanner McCauley

Colours
1st	2nd

Results

IHF U-21 World Championship
- Appearances: 2
- Last updated on Unknown.

The United States Junior Handball Team is the under–21 national handball team of the United States. Under the governance of USA Team Handball it represents the United States of America in international matches. The team recorded its first, inaugural win in the competition at the 2019 Men's Junior World Handball Championship against Australia. In 2023, for their second appearance, the team collected a total of two wins (Libya, Costa Rica) and one draw (Algeria). The team is set to compete at the 2025 IHF Men's U21 Handball World Championship this summer in Poland.

== Tournament summary ==
=== IHF Junior World Championship ===
Year	Round	Position	GP	W	D	L	GS	GA	GD
1979	WD								
1989	-	16th	6	0	0	6	86	230	-144
Macedonia 2007	Did not qualify								
Egypt 2009	Did not qualify								
Greece 2011	Did not qualify								
Bosnia and Herzegovina 2013	Did not qualify								
Brazil 2015	Did not qualify								
Algeria 2017	Did not qualify								
Spain 2019	Presidents' cup	22nd	7	1	0	6	142	205	-63
Germany/Greece 2023	Presidents' cup	27th	7	2	1	4	161	243	-82
Poland 2025	-	26th	7	2	0	5	203	237	-34
Total	4/24	0 Titles	27	5	1	21	592	905	-323

https://pl.wikipedia.org/wiki/Mistrzostwa_%C5%9Awiata_U-21_w_Pi%C5%82ce_R%C4%99cznej_M%C4%99%C5%BCczyzn_1989

=== IHF Inter-Continental Trophy ===
Year	Position
Pristina 2019	3rd
Pristina 2025	1st
Total	2
