= Cook Islands men's national youth handball team =

Cook Islands

Information
- Association: Cook Islands Handball Association

Colours
1st	2nd

Results

Youth Olympic Games
- Appearances: 1 (First in 2010)
- Best result: 6th Place (2010)

IHF U-19 World Championship
- Appearances: None

Oceania Youth Handball Championship
- Appearances: 3 (First in 2011)
- Best result: (bronze) (2011)
- Last updated on 22 December 2022.

The Cook Islands youth national handball team is the national Under 19's male handball team of Cook Islands.

== History ==
=== Youth Olympic Games record ===
Year	Round	Position	GP	W	D	L	GS	GA	GD
Singapore 2010	1st	6th	4	0	0	4	46	176	–130
China 2014	Did not qualify								
Total	1/2	0 Titles	4	0	0	4	46	176	–130

=== Oceania Handball Nations Cup record ===
Year	Position
Cook Islands 2011	3rd
New Caledonia 2018	6th
Cook Islands 2022	5th
Total	3/5
