= Time in Albania =

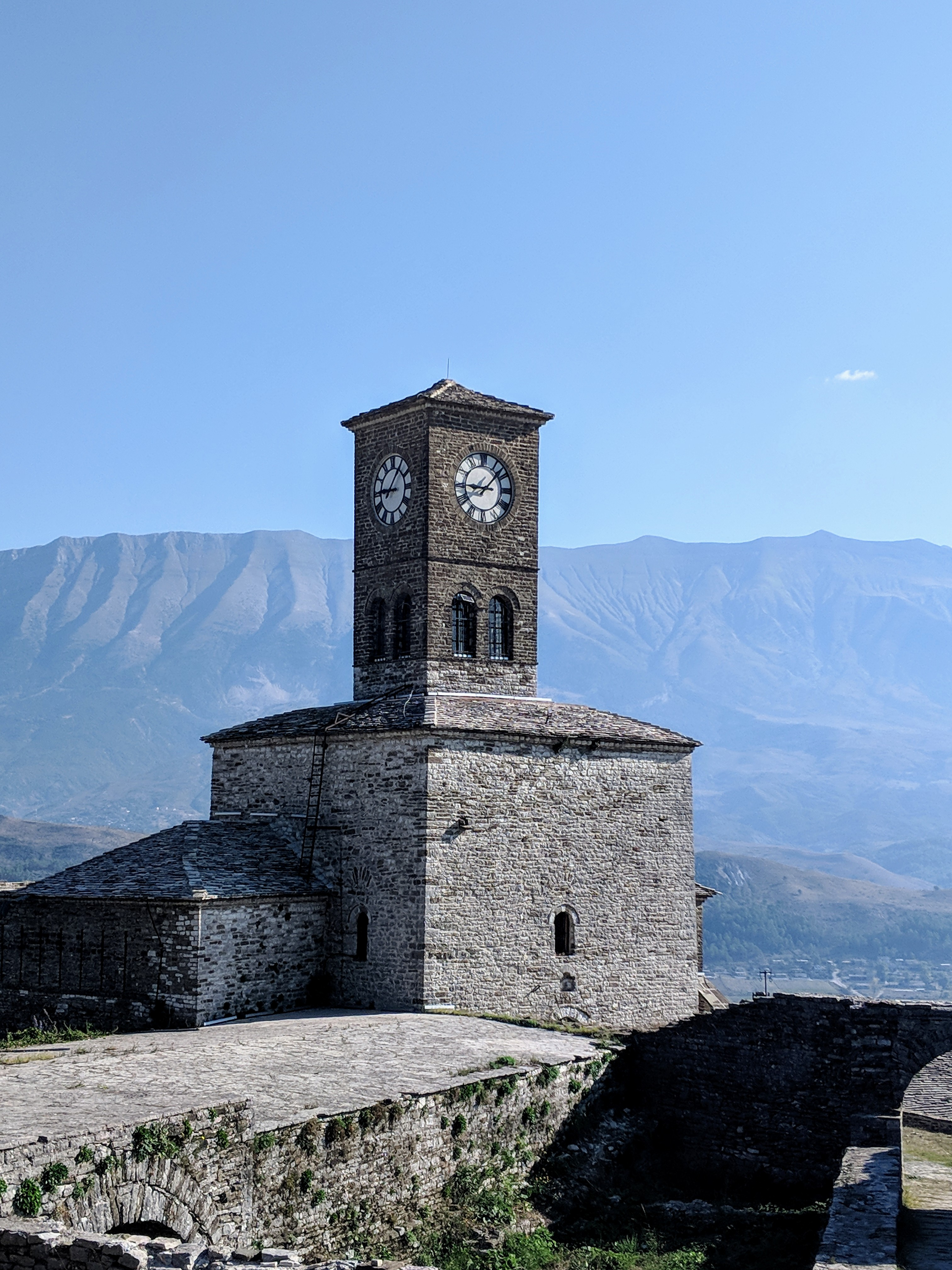
- A clock tower in Gjirokastër
- Time zone: Central European Time
- Initials: CET
- UTC offset: UTC+01:00
- Adopted: 1914

Daylight saving time
- Name: Central European Summer Time
- Initials: CEST
- UTC offset: UTC+02:00
- Start: Last Sunday in March (02:00 CET)
- End: Last Sunday in October (03:00 CEST)

tz database
- Europe/Tirane

In Albania, the standard time is Central European Time (CET; UTC+01:00). Daylight saving time, which moves one hour ahead to Central European Summer Time, is observed from the last Sunday in March (02:00 CET) to the last Sunday in October (03:00 CEST). Albania adopted CET in 1914.

== IANA time zone database ==
In the IANA time zone database, Albania is given the zone Europe/Tirane.

| c.c.* | coordinates* | TZ* | Comments | UTC offset | DST |
|---|---|---|---|---|---|
| AL | +4120+01950 | Europe/Tirane | | +01:00 | +02:00 |

== See also ==
- Time in Europe
- Time in Bosnia and Herzegovina
- Time in Kosovo
