= 2017 Oceania Men's Handball Challenge Trophy =

The 2017 Men's Oceania Handball Challenge Trophy was held at the Bluesky Sports Arena, Rarotonga, Cook Islands in between 31 July and 6 August 2017.

The competition participants were defending champions Tahiti, Australia, host Cook Islands, New Zealand, New Caledonia and Papua New Guinea.

Defending Champions Tahiti won over New Caledonia. Australia took the bronze, next was New Zealand. Papua New Guinea were fifth with tournament hosts Cook Islands sixth. Voted best player was Teva’i Hanere from Tahiti. Tahiti qualify for the 2017 IHF Inter-Continental Trophy in Gothenburg, Sweden.

== Results ==
Team	Pld	W	D	L	GF	GA	GD	Pts
French Polynesia	5	5	0	0	197	79	+118	10
New Caledonia	5	4	0	1	175	118	+57	8
Australia	5	3	0	2	138	110	+28	6
New Zealand	5	2	0	3	151	130	+21	4
Papua New Guinea	5	1	0	4	118	190	−72	2
Cook Islands	5	0	0	5	59	211	−152	0

31 July, 2017; 11:00	French Polynesia	34 – 18	New Zealand	Bluesky Sports Arena, Cook Islands
31 July, 2017; 11:00		(14-11)		Bluesky Sports Arena, Cook Islands

31 July, 2017; 13:00	Australia	39 – 9	Cook Islands	Bluesky Sports Arena, Cook Islands
31 July, 2017; 13:00		(22-1)		Bluesky Sports Arena, Cook Islands

31 July, 2017; 15:00	New Caledonia	46 - 18	Papua New Guinea	Bluesky Sports Arena, Cook Islands
31 July, 2017; 15:00		(23-8)		Bluesky Sports Arena, Cook Islands

1 August, 2017; 11:00	New Zealand	21 - 28	Australia	Bluesky Sports Arena, Cook Islands
1 August, 2017; 11:00		(9-13)		Bluesky Sports Arena, Cook Islands

1 August, 2017; 13:00	French Polynesia	51 - 17	Papua New Guinea	Bluesky Sports Arena, Cook Islands
1 August, 2017; 13:00		(28-10)		Bluesky Sports Arena, Cook Islands

1 August, 2017; 15:00	Cook Islands	14 - 46	New Caledonia	Bluesky Sports Arena, Cook Islands
1 August, 2017; 15:00		(9-26)		Bluesky Sports Arena, Cook Islands

2 August, 2017; 11:00	Cook Islands	8 - 46	French Polynesia	Bluesky Sports Arena, Cook Islands
2 August, 2017; 11:00		(5-18)		Bluesky Sports Arena, Cook Islands

2 August, 2017; 13:00	Australia	25 - 32	New Caledonia	Bluesky Sports Arena, Cook Islands
2 August, 2017; 13:00		(14-15)		Bluesky Sports Arena, Cook Islands

2 August, 2017; 15:00	New Zealand	45 - 27	Papua New Guinea	Bluesky Sports Arena, Cook Islands
2 August, 2017; 15:00		(15-20)		Bluesky Sports Arena, Cook Islands

3 August, 2017; 11:00	Australia	29 - 16	Papua New Guinea	Bluesky Sports Arena, Cook Islands
3 August, 2017; 11:00		(17-11)		Bluesky Sports Arena, Cook Islands

3 August, 2017; 13:00	New Caledonia	19 - 34	French Polynesia	Bluesky Sports Arena, Cook Islands
3 August, 2017; 13:00		(9-15)		Bluesky Sports Arena, Cook Islands

3 August, 2017; 15:00	New Zealand	40 - 9	Cook Islands	Bluesky Sports Arena, Cook Islands
3 August, 2017; 15:00		(17-2)		Bluesky Sports Arena, Cook Islands

4 August, 2017; 11:00	Papua New Guinea	40 - 19	Cook Islands	Bluesky Sports Arena, Cook Islands
4 August, 2017; 11:00		(15-6)		Bluesky Sports Arena, Cook Islands

4 August, 2017; 13:00	New Zealand	27 - 32	New Caledonia	Bluesky Sports Arena, Cook Islands
4 August, 2017; 13:00		(13-15)		Bluesky Sports Arena, Cook Islands

4 August, 2017; 15:00	French Polynesia	32 - 17	Australia	Bluesky Sports Arena, Cook Islands
4 August, 2017; 15:00		(13-7)		Bluesky Sports Arena, Cook Islands

== Rankings ==
Classification
1st place, gold medalist(s)	French Polynesia
2nd place, silver medalist(s)	New Caledonia
3rd place, bronze medalist(s)	Australia
4	New Zealand
5	Papua New Guinea
6	Cook Islands
