= Australia men's national youth handball team =

Australia

Information
- Association: Australian Handball Federation
- Coach: Ricki Lyngsøe

Colours
1st	2nd

Results

Youth Olympic Games
- Appearances: 0

IHF U-19 World Championship
- Appearances: 1 (First in 2007)
- Best result: 16th, 2007

Oceania Youth Handball Championship
- Appearances: 5 (First in 2007)
- Best result: 1st, 2007
- Last updated on Unknown.

The Australian national youth handball team is the national under–18 Handball team of Australia. Controlled by the Australian Handball Federation it represents Australia in international matches.

== History ==
=== Youth Olympic Games record ===
Year	Round	Position	GP	W	D*	L	GS	GA	GD
Singapore 2010	Did not qualify								
China 2014	Did not qualify								
Total	0/2	0 Titles	0	0	0	0	0	0	0

=== Oceania Nations Cup record ===
Year	Position
2007	1st
2009	2nd
2011	2nd
2018	3rd
2022	4th
Total	5/5

=== World Championship record ===
Year	Position	GP	W	D*	L	GS	GA	GD
Qatar 2005	Did not qualify							
Bahrain 2007	16th	7	0	0	7	137	374	–237
Tunisia 2009	Did not qualify							
Argentina 2011	Did not qualify							
Hungary 2013	Did not qualify							
Russia 2015	Did not qualify							
Georgia 2017	Did not qualify							
North Macedonia 2019	Did not qualify							
Greece 2021	Cancelled due to COVID-19							
Croatia 2023	Did not qualify							
Egypt 2025	Did not qualify							
Total	0 Titles	7	0	0	7	137	374	–237
