= Australia men's national junior handball team =

Australia

Information
- Association: Australian Handball Federation
- Coach: Ricki Lyngsøe (Denmark)

Colours
1st	2nd

Results

IHF U-21 World Championship
- Appearances: 1 (First in 2019)
- Best result: 24th (2019)

Oceania Handball Challenge Trophy
- Appearances: 5 (First in 1998)
- Best result: 1st (1998, 2010, 2012)
- Last updated on Unknown.

The Australian national junior handball team is the national under-21 handball team of Australia. Controlled by the Australian Handball Federation it represents Australia in international matches.

== Tournament summary ==
=== Oceania Nations Cup ===
Year	Round	Position	GP	W	D*	L	GS	GA	GD
1998	Final	1st	2	2	0	0	72	46	26
2010	Final	1st	6	6	0	0	203	93	110
2012	Final	1st	5	4	1	0	177	95	82
2014	Final	2nd	6	4	0	2	179	102	77
2017	3rd place game	3rd	5	3	0	2	131	110	21
2018	Final	1st	5	5	0	0	133	96	37
Total	6/6	4 Titles	24	19	1	5	895	542	353

=== World Championship ===
Year	Round	Position	GP	W	D	L	GS	GA
Qatar 1999	Qualified. Did not compete							
Switzerland 2001	Did not qualify							
Brazil 2003	Did not qualify							
Hungary 2005	Did not qualify							
Macedonia 2007	Did not qualify							
Egypt 2009	Did not qualify							
Greece 2011	Qualified. Did not compete							
Bosnia and Herzegovina 2013	Qualified. Did not compete							
Brazil 2015	Did not qualify							
Algeria 2017	Did not qualify							
Spain 2019	Presidents' cup	24th	7	0	0	7	123	280
Total	1/21	0 Titles	7	0	0	7	123	280

=== IHF Inter-Continental Trophy ===
Year	Position
Jaipur 2011	5th
Monterrey 2013	5th
Gabrovo 2015	Did not qualify
Pristina 2019	6th
San Jose 2023	5th
Total	4/5
