= Australia women's national junior handball team =

Australia

Information
- Association: Australian Handball Federation

Colours
1st	2nd

Results

IHF U-20 World Championship
- Appearances: 2 (First in 2008)
- Best result: 20th, 2008

Oceania Handball Challenge Trophy
- Appearances: 5 (First in 1997)
- Best result: 1st twice
- Last updated on 10 December 2023.

The Australian women's national junior handball team is the national under-19/21 Handball team of Australia. Controlled by the Australian Handball Federation it represents Australia in international matches.

In December 2015 they played in the Singapore SHOT tournament playing four games but losing all of them. They also played three games in the New South Wales Women's League to gain valuable game time together. This is all preparation for the Oceania title in 2016.

== History ==
=== World Championship record ===
Year	Round	Position	GP	W	D	L	GS	GA	F/A
(North Macedonia) 2008	1st round	20th	8	0	0	8	141	295	-154
(South Korea) 2010	1st round	22nd	7	1	0	6	121	275	-154
Total	2/22	no titles	15	1	0	14	262	570	-308

=== Oceania Nations Cup record ===
Year	Round	Position	GP	W	D	L	GS	GA	GD
1997	Final	1st	2	2	0	0	30	23	7
2012	Final	1st	5	5	0	0	135	57	78
2014	Final	2nd	5	4	0	1	101	61	40
2019	Final	2nd	5	4	0	1	127	73	55
2023	Final	4th	4	1	0	3	56	74	-18
Total	5/5	2 Titles	21	16	0	5	449	288	161
