= New Zealand men's national youth handball team =

New Zealand

Information
- Association: New Zealand Handball Federation

Colours
1st	2nd

Results

Youth Olympic Games
- Appearances: None

IHF U-19 World Championship
- Appearances: 1 (First in 2011)
- Best result: 20th (2011)

Oceania Youth Handball Championship
- Appearances: 3 (First in 2011)
- Best result: (gold) Champions (2011, 2018)
- Last updated on Unknown.

The New Zealand national youth handball team is the national under-19 men's handball team of New Zealand and is controlled by the New Zealand Handball Federation.

== Results ==
=== Youth Olympic Games record ===
Year	Round	Position	GP	W	D	L	GS	GA	GD
Singapore 2010	Did not qualify								
China 2014	Did not qualify								
Total	0/2	0 Titles	0	0	0	0	0	0	0

=== World Championship record ===
Year	Position	GP	W	D	L	GS	GA	GD
Qatar 2005	Did not qualify							
Bahrain 2007	Did not qualify							
Tunisia 2009	Did not qualify							
Argentina 2011	20th	6	0	0	6	97	307	–210
Hungary 2013	Did not qualify							
Russia 2015	Did not qualify							
Georgia 2017	Did not qualify							
North Macedonia 2019	Qualified. Did not attend							
Croatia 2023	31st	6	0	0	6	89	287	–198
Egypt 2025	Did not qualify							
Total	0 Titles	12	0	0	12	186	594	–408

=== Oceania Nations Cup record ===
Year	Round	Position	GP	W	D	L	GS	GA	GD
2007	Final	2nd	?	?	?	?	?	?	?
2011	Final	1st	?	?	?	?	?	?	?
2018	Final	1st	5	5	0	0	170	79	91
Total	3/3	2 titles	5	5	0	0	170	79	91

=== IHF Inter-Continental Trophy ===
Year	Position	GP	W	D	L	GS	GA	GD
2019	6th	3	0	0	3	44	101	-57
Total	No titles	3	0	0	3	44	101	-57
