= Canada women's national junior handball team =

Canada

Information
- Association: Canadian Team Handball Federation
- Coach: Stephane Berteau

Colours
1st	2nd

Results

IHF U-20 World Championship
- Appearances: 3 (First in 1981)
- Best result: 8th (1981)
- Last updated on Unknown.

The Canada women's junior national handball team is the national under-19 handball team of Canada. Controlled by the Canadian Team Handball Federation it represents the country in international matches.

== World Championship record ==
- 1981 – 8th place
- 1999 – 20th place
- 2026 – 31st place
