= 1998 Oceania Junior Men's Handball Championship =

The 1998 Oceania Junior Men's Handball Championship, was the first official competition for junior men's national handball teams from Oceania. It was held from December 11–12, 1998 in Mittagong, New South Wales, Australia. It also acted as the qualifying competition for the 1999 IHF Men's Junior World Championship, securing one Vacancy for the World Championship.

Australia and New Zealand played a two-game series to determine the winner. Australia was the winner, but decided to defer its entry to the World Cup and New Zealand took their place.

== Overview ==
Team 1	Agg.	Team 2	1st leg	2nd leg
Australia	72–46	New Zealand	32–23	40–23
