= Time in Bosnia and Herzegovina =

Bosnia and Herzegovina uses a single time zone, denoted as Central European Time (CET: UTC+01:00). It also observes summer time, shifting to Central European Summer Time (CEST: UTC+02:00).

The shift to Daylight Saving Time (DST) occurs on the date as specified for the European Summer Time since 1983, when the system was introduced in the former SFR Yugoslavia.

== IANA time zone database ==
The IANA time zone database contains one zone for Bosnia and Herzegovina in the file zone.tab, named Europe/Sarajevo.
