= Australian Handball Federation =

Handball governing body

Australian Handball Federation AHF
- IOC nation: Commonwealth of Australia (AUS)
- Sport: Handball
- Other sports: Beach handball; Wheelchair handball
- Official website: www.handballaustralia.org.au

HISTORY
- Year of formation: 1985; 41 years ago

DEMOGRAPHICS
- Membership size: 6 Full Members; 2 Associated Members

AFFILIATIONS
- International federation: International Handball Federation (IHF)
- IHF member since: 1988
- Continental association: Oceania Continent Handball Federation
- National Olympic Committee: Australian Olympic Committee
- Other affiliation(s): Commonwealth Handball Association; Australian Sports Commission

GOVERNING BODY
- President: Mr. Daniel Babich

HEADQUARTERS
- Address: Sports House, Sydney Olympic Park, Sydney
- Country: Australia
- Secretary General: Ms. Bronwyn Thompson

The Australian Handball Federation (AHF) is the governing body for the Olympic sport of handball (also known as European Handball or Olympic Handball) in Australia.

== History ==
The body was founded in 1985. In 1988, the body became the 100th member of the International Handball Federation. There are currently 204 member nations of the IHF.

== State members ==
Code	State	Federation/Association
ACT	(Australian Capital Territory)	Australian Capital Territory Handball Association
NSW	(New South Wales)	New South Wales Handball Association
NT	(Northern Territory)	Northern Territory Handball Association
QLD	(Queensland)	Handball Queensland (Queensland Team Handball Association)
SA	(South Australia)	Handball SA
TAS	(Tasmania)	Tasmanian Handball League
VIC	(Victoria (state))	Handball Federation of Victoria
WA	(Western Australia)	Handball Western Australian

- State Members makeup on AHF website

== National teams ==
Australian teams world rankings
Team	Rank	Points	Reference
Overall	41	48	Reference
Men	36	7	Reference
Women	34	7	Reference
Men U21	No ranking	–	Reference
Women U21	46	3	Reference
Men U18	30	3	Reference
Women U18	No ranking	–	Reference
Men Beach	16	3	Reference
Women Beach	16	5	Reference
Men Olympic	30	4	Reference
Women Olympic	25	6	Reference
rankings as of June 2016

The national team coach for the men is Taip Ramadani since September 2021

The Australian Men's Indoor team have qualified for seven IHF World Men's Handball Championships, have won five Oceania Handball Nations Cups and participated in the Handball at the 2000 Summer Olympics – Men's tournament, Sydney.

The Australian Women's Indoor team have qualified for seven IHF World Women's Handball Championships and won six Oceania Handball Nations Cups and participated in the Handball at the 2000 Summer Olympics – Women's tournament|Sydney.

Both the Men's and Women's National Beach Handball teams have participated at three Beach Handball World Championships and Beach Handball at the 2013 World Games.

At a Junior level Australia has qualified for the IHF Women's Junior World Championship, IHF Men's Youth World Championship and Handball at the Youth Olympic Games. In 2013, the Men & Women Under 21 were invited to the 2013 Continental Challenge Trophy in Mexico. Neither team won a game.

=== Main pages ===
- Australia Men's Handball team
- Australia Junior Men's Handball team
- Australia Youth Boy's Handball team
- Australia Women's Handball team
- Australia Junior Women's Handball team
- Australia Youth Girl's Handball team
- Australia Men's Beach Handball team
- Australia Women's Beach Handball team

== National championships ==
The National championships involve all state and territory federations. Main article Australian National Handball Championship

Australia also has a national club championship. The winner of this goes to the Oceania Handball Champions Cup. Main article Australian Handball Club Championship

== See also ==
- Oceania Handball Nations Cup – Seniors
- Oceania Handball Challenge Trophy – Junior (Under 21s)
- Oceania Youth Handball Championship – Youth – (Under 19s)
- Oceania Beach Handball Championship - Seniors
- Oceania Junior Beach Handball Championship - Under 19's
- Handball League Australia
- Australian University Games
