= IHF Honorary President and Honorary Members =

- Sport: Handball
- Awarded for: Outstanding services to international handball
- Presented by: International Handball Federation

History
- First award: 1966
- First winner: Willy Burmeister (West Germany)
- Most recent: Christophe Yapo Achy (Ivory Coast)

IHF Honorary President and Honorary Members is an award established by the International Handball Federation. It is awarded by the IHF Congress to individuals who have rendered outstanding services to the international handball.

At the recommendation of the IHF Council or a member association, retiring chairman and members of bodies may be appointed as honorary president or honorary members by the IHF Congress.

== Award ==
The award consists of the insignia of the IHF Council with full garland in gold and a personal gift. The recipient also receives a pass, entitling him/her to free entry to all handball events held by any member federation around the world. The Honorary president is also sent an invitation by the International Handball Federation to attend the IHF Council meeting. The honorary president may give suggestions on any matter but had not any voting right.

The award was first awarded to Willy Burmeister of West Germany in 1966 when he was made honorary member of the IHF. Paul Högberg of Sweden was made first honorary president while Raymond Hahn of France was made first honorary secretary general.

== IHF Honorary Presidents ==
Year	Name	Country	Notes
1984	Mr. Paul Högberg	Sweden	3rd IHF President from 1971 to 1984.
2000	Mr. Erwin Lanc	Austria	4th IHF President from 1984 to 2000.

== IHF Honorary Secretary General ==
Year	Name	Country	Notes
2004	Mr. Raymond Hahn	France	4th IHF Secretary General from 1988 to 2004.

== IHF Honorary Members ==
Honorary Member	Country	Honorary Since	Notes
Otto Schwarz	Switzerland	1994	Chairman of IHF Commission of Organizing and Competitions, IHF Executive Committee Member
Tadeusz Breguła	Poland	1994	Chairman of IHF Commission of Coaching and Methods
Kim Chong-ha	South Korea	1996	IHF Council Member
Heinz Suter	Switzerland	1996	Member of IHF Commission of Coaching and Methods
Rudi Glock	West Germany / Germany	2000	IHF Treasurer from 1988 to 2000
Dr. Nabil Salem	Egypt	2000	President of African Handball Confederation from 1993 to 1996, IHF Vice-President from 1992 to 2000, Member of IHF Medical Commission
Henrik Vænerberg	Finland	2000	President of Finland Handball Association
Hermann Brunner	Costa Rica	2004	IHF Council Member, President of Costa Rica Handball Federation from 1978 to 2008
Karl Güntzel	Switzerland	2004	IHF Council Member
Dr. Gijs Langevoort	Netherlands	2004	Chairman of IHF Medical Commission
Jean-Michel Germain	France	2004	Technical Director of French Handball Federation, Member of IHF Commission of Coaching and Methods
Jörgen Holmqvist	Sweden	2009	Chairman of IHF Arbitration Tribunal
Peter Mühlematter	Switzerland	2009	Member of IHF Commission for Promotion and Public Relations, Chairman of IHF Commission of Organising and Competitions, IHF Secretary General from 2004 to 2009.
Ms. Carin Nilsson Green	Sweden	2009	Chairperson of IHF Commission for Promotion and Public Relations
Ulrich Strombach	Germany	2009	Chairman of IHF Arbitration Commission, President of German Handball Association from 1998 to 2013
Christer Ahl	United States	2009	Member of IHF Playing Rules and Referees Commission
Christophe Yapo Achy	Ivory Coast	2009	IHF Vice-President, Secretary General of African Handball Confederation from 1978 to 1993, President of African Handball Confederation from 1996 to 2008

== Former IHF Honorary Members ==
Following is the list IHF Honorary Members who died after getting the award. There are also some members who were awarded the IHF Honorary Membership posthumously; they are marked with star after their name.

Honorary Member	Country	Since	Until	Notes
Willy Burmeister	West Germany	1966		Member of International Amateur Handball Federation's Technical Commission from 1928 to 1938, Member of IHF Technical Commission from 1956 to 1966.
Einar Kaspersen	Norway	1970		President of Norwegian Handball Federation from 1951 to 1955, IHF Council Member
Risto Orko	Finland	1970		IHF Council Member
Charles Petit Montgobert	France	1970		IHF Vice-President from 1950 to 1970
Wobbe Akkermann	Netherlands	1970		IHF Council Member
Hans Baumann*	Switzerland	1972	1972	IHF President from 1950 to 1971
Charles Martin	France	1972		IHF Council Member
René Ricard	France	1972		Member of IHF Technical Commission
Albert Wagner	Switzerland	1972		IHF Secretary General from 1950 to 1972
Axel Ahm	Denmark	1976		Member of IHF Teachnical Commission and IHF Playing Rules and Referees Commission
Carl-Filip Borgh	Sweden	1976		IHF Secretary General from 1946 to 1950
Marijan Flander	Yugoslavia	1976		IHF Council Member, Member of IHF Technical Commission
Emil Horle	Switzerland	1976		Chairman of IHF Technical Commission and IHF Playing Rules and Referees Commission from 1946 to 1976
Hermann Milius	East Germany	1976		IHF Council Member
Leopold Stipkovich	Austria	1976		IHF Council Member
Anders Fredslund Pedersen	Denmark	1984		IHF Treasurer from 1972 to 1984
Nelson Paillou	France	1984		President of French Handball Federation and French Olympic Committee, IHF Council Member
Carl E. Wang	Norway	1984	2016	Chairman of IHF Playing Rules and Referees Commission
Aurelio Chiappero	Italy	1984		Secretary General of Italian Handball Federation from 1969 to 1973
Max Rinkenburger	West Germany	1988		IHF Treasurer from 1954 to 1972, IHF Secretary General from 1972 to 1988
Heinz Seiler	East Germany	1988		Technical Director of East Germany Handball Federation, IHF Council Member
Curt Wadmark	Sweden	1990	2003	Chairman of the IHF Commission of Organising and Competitions
Dr. Vladimir Krivcov	Soviet Union	1992		President of Soviet Union Handball Federation, IHF Vice-President from 1972 to 1992.
Alberto de San Roman y de la Fuente	Spain	1992		IHF Vice-President
Prof. Dr. Ioan Kunst-Ghermanescu	Romania	1992		President of Romanian Handball Federation, Chairman of IHF Commission of Coaching and Methods
Dr. István Madarasz	Hungary	1992	2010	Chairman of IHF Medical Commission
Petar Bucu	Yugoslavia	1992		Member of IHF Commission for Promotion and Public Relations, President of Yugoslavian Handball Federation, Deputy Sports Minister of Yugoslavia.
Bernhard Thiele	West Germany	1992		Chairman of IHF Commission for Promotion and Public Relations, President of German Handball Association from 1972 to 1990.
Friedrich Dusch	Austria	1992		Secretary General of Austrian Handball Federation, Member of IHF Commission of Organising and Competitions.
Werner Vick	West Germany	1992		Member of IHF Playing Rules and Referees Commission
Vasile Sidea	Romania	1992		Member of IHF Playing Rules and Referees Commission
Babacar Fall	Senegal	1994		President of African Handball Confederation from 1973 to 1993, IHF Vice-President
Dr. Jaroslav Mráz	Czechoslovakia	1994	2016	Member of IHF Commission of Coaching and Methods
Dr. Walter Pallamar	Austria	1994		Member of IHF Medical Commission
Ivan Snoj	Yugoslavia	1994	1994	Member of IHF Commission of Coaching and Methods
Erik Elias	Sweden	1996		Chairman of IHF Playing Rules and Referees Commission
Dr. Walter Schwedhelm	Mexico	1996	2013	Secretary General of Pan-American Team Handball Federation from 1997 to 1980, President of Pan-American Team Handball Federation from 1980 to 1984.
Prof. Dr. Hans-Georg Herrmann	Germany	1996		Chairman of IHF Commission for Promotion and Public Relations
Dr. Jiří Jeschke	Czech Republic	1996		Member of IHF Medical Commission
Dr. Peter Buehning	United States	2000		IHF Vice-President, President of Pan-American Team Handball Federation from 1977 to 1980 and 1987 to 1996
Janis Grinbergas	Lithuania	2000	2013	Member of IHF Playing Rules and Referees Commission
Er. Erik Larsen	Denmark	2000	2013	Secretary General of Danish Handball Federation, Member of IHF Commission of Organizing and Competitions
Jeff Rowland	United Kingdom	2000		President of British Handball Association
Kjartan K. Steinbach	Iceland	2004	2018	Chairman of IHF Playing Rules and Referees Commission from 1996 - 2004
Øivind Bolstad	Norway	2009	2016	Chairman of IHF Playing Rules and Referees Commission
