= Bangladesh men's national under-17 handball team =

Bangladesh

Information
- Nickname: Red and Green Tigers
- Association: Bangladesh Handball Federation
- Coach: Anisur Rahman Patowary

Colours
1st	2nd

Results

IHF U-19 World Championship
- Appearances: 0

Asian Men's U-17 Handball Championship
- Appearances: 0
- Last updated on 27 November 2025.

The Bangladesh national men's youth handball team is the under-17s national team representing Bangladesh in the international handball competitions and is controlled by the Bangladesh Handball Federation (BHF).

== Competitive records ==
=== IHF Men's U17 Handball World Championship ===
IHF Men's U17 Handball World Championship records
Host	Result	Position	Pld	W	D	L	GF	GA	GD
(Morocco) 2025 Casablanca	Did not qualify								
Total	0/1		0	0	0	0	0	0	0

=== Asian Men's U-17 Handball Championship ===
Asian Men's U-17 Championship records
Host	Result	Position	Pld	W	D	L	GF	GA	GD
(Jordan) 2025 Amman	Did not qualify								
Total	0/1		0	0	0	0	0	0	0
