= Hans Baumann Trophy =

- Sport: Handball
- Awarded for: Awarded for extraordinary contribution to the development of Handball
- Local name: Trophée Hans Baumann (French)
- Presented by: International Handball Federation

History
- First award: 1972
- Editions: 22
- Final award: 2015
- First winner: (United Kingdom) British Handball Association
- Most recent: (Denmark) Danish Handball Federation
- Website: ihf.info

The Hans Baumann Trophy, which was endowed by the Spanish members of the IHF, commemorates the late President of the IHF (1950 to 1971), Hans Baumann. It is awarded to IHF member federations from 1972 to 2015. In 2017, the IHF Council decided to reform and rename it as the IHF President's Development Award.

== History ==
The Hans Baumann Trophy was awarded to a member federation every two years at the IHF Congress from 1972 to 2015. It was awarded for particular services to the development and spread of Handball in the member federation's own country and/or throughout the world.

The recipient was selected and the trophy awarded by the IHF Council at the recommendation of the IHF Executive Committee. Member federations may submit a detailed recommendation to the IHF Head Office, specifying the reasons, no later than six months before the Congress.

The member federation receiving the award was given a diploma drawn up by the donors and a small replica of the trophy.

In 1986, Royal Spanish Handball Federation has been selected as the recipient of the Hans Baumann Trophy. The Royal Spanish Handball Federation has made a particular contribution by organizing the symposium and special tournament for studying and testing new ideas for the format of the game.

In 2002, Handball Federation of Russia has been selected as the recipient of the Hans Baumann Trophy. The Handball Union of Russia was awarded the trophy for the great contribution to the world development of this sport.

In 2017, IHF Council decided to reframe and rename it as the IHF President's Development Award.

== List of winners ==
From the commencement of the Trophy till 2015 when the award was reformed and renamed as IHF President's Development Award, the trophy has been awarded to the following national handball federations for their extra ordinary contribution to the development of Handball.

Year	Winner
1972	(United Kingdom) British Handball Association
1974	(Italy) Italian Handball Federation
1976	(Algeria) Algerian Handball Federation
1978	Kuwait Handball Association
1980	(France) French Handball Federation
1982	(South Korea) Korea Handball Federation
1984	(Republic of the Congo) Congolese Handball Federation
1986	(Spain) Royal Spanish Handball Federation
1988	(Austria) Austrian Handball Association
1990	(Portugal) Portuguese Handball Federation
1992	(Ivory Coast) Federation Ivoirienne de Handball
1994	None awarded
1996	(Brazil) Brazilian Handball Confederation
1998	Japan Handball Association
2000	(China) Chinese Handball Association
2002	Handball Union of Russia
2004	(Croatia) Croatian Handball Federation
2007	(Romania) Romanian Handball Federation
2009	(Germany) German Handball Association
2011	(Argentina) Argentinean Handball Confederation
2013	(Denmark) Danish Handball Federation
2015	None awarded
