= Hans Baumann (handball) =

Swiss architect and sports administrator

His Excellency Hans Baumann

2nd President of International Handball Federation
- In office 9 September 1950 – 7 February 1971
- Preceded by: Gösta Björk (Sweden)
- Succeeded by: Paul Högberg (Sweden)

Vice-President of International Handball Federation
- In office 11 July 1946 – 9 September 1950 Serving with Charles Petit-Montgobert (France)
- President: Gösta Björk (Sweden)
- Preceded by: Office created
- Succeeded by: Charles Petit-Montgobert (France); Palle Kristensen (Denmark)

Personal details
- Born: 1906 Basel (Switzerland)
- Died: 7 February 1971 (aged 64–65) Basel (Switzerland)
- Cause of death: Heart attack
- Occupation: Sports administrator
- Profession: Architect

Hans Baumann (1906 – 7 February 1971) was a Swiss architect and sports administrator who was one of the founding members of the International Handball Federation (IHF). He served as the second President of the IHF from 1950 to 1971.

== Biography ==
Born in Basel, Baumann was an architect by profession. He became a member of the management committee of the Swiss Handball Association in 1939. He had previously served as the vice-president of the IHF from 1946 to 1950 along with Charles Petit-Montgobert (France) under the presidency of Gösta Björk (Sweden). Baumann was elected as IHF President in the 3rd IHF Congress held in Vienna on 9 September 1950, succeesding Björk. From then onwards, he was continuously elected unopposed as IHF President until his death.

Baumann's main aim was to see handball return to the Olympic programme, which he achieved but was not able to witness himself—he died due to heart attack in Basel on 7 February 1971, a year and a half before the Olympic Handball Tournament in the Munich games. In this time the first IHF World Men's Handball Championship was held in 1954 and three years later the first IHF World Women's Handball Championship in 1957.

After his death and in recognition of his great contribution to the development of handball worldwide, the IHF Council and Royal Spanish Handball Federation together created an award named the Hans Baumann Trophy, which would be awarded biannually during IHF Congress to the member federations for their outstanding contribution to the development of handball in their country and throughout the world. In 2016, the award was re-established and renamed by IHF Council as the IHF President's Development Award.

Preceded by Gösta Björk	IHF President; 1950 - 1971	Succeeded by Paul Högberg
