= IHF Olympic Order =

The Council of the IHF is entitled and has the duty to suggest to the IOC eminent personalities for the award of the Olympic Order in recognition of their outstanding merit and success in the development of handball in their own country, their many years of close collaborative links with the IHF and their dedicated service to the Olympic Movement.

== Olympic Order ==
The Olympic Order is the highest award of the Olympic Movement and is awarded for particularly distinguished contributions to the Olympic Movement, i.e. recognition of efforts worthy of merit in the cause of sport. It was established in May 1975 by the International Olympic Committee as a successor to the Olympic Certificate. The Olympic Order originally had three grades (gold, silver and bronze), although the bronze grade fell dormant in 1984. Traditionally, the IOC bestows the Olympic Order upon the chief national organiser(s) at the closing ceremony of each respective Olympic Games.

The insignia of the Olympic Order is in the form of a collar (or chain), in Gold, Silver or Bronze according to grade; the front of the chain depicts the five rings of the Olympic Movement, flanked on either side by kotinos emblem (olive wreath). A lapel badge, in the form of the five rings in Gold, Silver and Bronze according to grade, is presented to recipients to wear as appropriate.

Nadia Comăneci is the only athlete to be awarded the Olympic Order twice (1984, 2004), as well as being its youngest ever recipient.

== Recipients of IHF Olympic Order ==
Year	Recipient	Country
1984	Nelson Paillou	France
1984	Jószef Szalay	Hungary
1984	Paul Högberg	Sweden
1986	Max Rinkenburger	West Germany
1991	Prof. Ioan Kunst-Ghermănescu	Romania
1994	Dr. Er. Vladimir Krivcov	Soviet Union / Russia
1996	Vladimir Maksimov	Soviet Union / Russia
1998	Aleksandr Kozhukow	Soviet Union / Russia
2001	Raymond Hahn	France
2001	Janis Grinbergas	Lithuania
2002	Erwin Lanc	Austria
