= 2026 IHF Women's U16 Handball World Championship =

Tournament details
- Host country: Morocco
- Venues: 2 (in 1 host city)
- Dates: 16–24 October
- Teams: 16 (from 5 confederations)

Final positions
- Champions: Germany (1st title)
- Runners-up: Hungary
- Third place: Russia
- Fourth place: China

Tournament statistics
- Matches played: 40
- Goals scored: 2,662 (66.55 per match)
- Attendance: 7,644 (191 per match)
- Top scorers: (China) Du Meishan (54 goals)

Awards
- Best player: (Hungary) Hanna Molnár

The 2026 IHF Women's U16 Handball World Championship was the first edition of the IHF Women's U16 Handball World Championship, held from 16 to 24 October 2026 in Morocco under the aegis of International Handball Federation (IHF).

Germany won the tournament with a finals win over Hungary.

== Qualification ==
Sixteen teams participatde, increased from its original 12 team plan.

Event	Dates	Host	Vacancies	Qualified
Host nation			1	Morocco
Asian U16 Championships	10–18 May 2026	(Kazakhstan) Almaty	2	China; Uzbekistan
W16 European Open	29 June – 3 July 2026	(Sweden) Gothenburg	2	Germany; Hungary
North America and Caribbean	29 June – 5 July 2026	Mexico City	2	Mexico; United States
South and Central American U15 Championships	4–8 August 2026	(Paraguay) Asunción	2	Argentina; Paraguay
Africa			2	Egypt; Guinea
Wildcard			5	Belarus; Kazakhstan; Russia; Switzerland; Tunisia

== Referees ==
The referees were announced on 8 September 2026.

Referees
Argentina	Barbara Fernández; Ailen Giampietro
Dominican Republic	Yeison Agramonte; Luis de Jesús
France	Mathilde Cournil; Loriane Lamour
Greece	Ioannis Fotakidis; Charalampos Kinatzidis
Morocco	Zakaria El Malwane; Achraf El Mouniri
Montenegro	Slađana Martinović; Milica Pavićević
Norway	Andreas Borge; Magnus Nygren

Referees
Poland	Sylwia Bartkowiak; Weronika Łakomy
Romania	Corina Răduț; Daniela Enache
Rwanda	Gad Imanimbahafi; Jean Tuyizere
South Korea	Cha Chang-hwan; Pak Hyun-jin
Switzerland	Linus Hardegger; Simon Hardegger
Sweden	Alice Watson; Line Welin
Tunisia	Hiba Abdelkader; Wejdene Kechida

== Draw ==
The draw took place on 24 September 2026.

=== Seeding ===
Pot 1	Pot 2	Pot 3	Pot 4
Germany; Hungary; China; Argentina	Morocco; Uzbekistan; Egypt; Paraguay	Guinea; Mexico; United States; Switzerland	Kazakhstan; Russia; Tunisia; Belarus

== Preliminary round ==
All times are local (UTC±0).

=== Group A ===
Pos	Team	Pld	W	D	L	GF	GA	GD	Pts	Qualification
1	China	3	3	0	0	157	50	+107	6	Semifinals
2	Kazakhstan	3	2	0	1	94	101	−7	4	5–8th place semifinals
3	Morocco (H)	3	1	0	2	84	104	−20	2	9–12th place semifinals
4	United States	3	0	0	3	55	135	−80	0	13–16th place semifinals

Source: IHF
Rules for classification: 1) points; 2) head-to-head points; 3) head-to-head goal difference; 4) head-to-head number of goals scored; 5) goal difference.
(H) Hosts

16 October 2026; 14:00	China	61–10	United States	Al Inbiaat Hall, Agadir; Attendance: 220; Referees: Giampietro, Cournil, Kechida
16 October 2026; 14:00	Du 13	(35–4)	three players 2	Al Inbiaat Hall, Agadir; Attendance: 220; Referees: Giampietro, Cournil, Kechida
16 October 2026; 14:00	2× (suspension)	Report	6× (suspension)	Al Inbiaat Hall, Agadir; Attendance: 220; Referees: Giampietro, Cournil, Kechida

16 October 2026; 18:30	Morocco	29–35	Kazakhstan	Al Inbiaat Hall, Agadir; Attendance: 650; Referees: Fernández, Pavićević, Welin
16 October 2026; 18:30	Boukherouk, Yacoubi 8	(12–20)	Kyrgyzbay 14	Al Inbiaat Hall, Agadir; Attendance: 650; Referees: Fernández, Pavićević, Welin
16 October 2026; 18:30	2× (yellow card) 5× (suspension)	Report	3× (suspension)	Al Inbiaat Hall, Agadir; Attendance: 650; Referees: Fernández, Pavićević, Welin

18 October 2026; 14:00	Kazakhstan	22–43	China	Al Inbiaat Hall, Agadir; Attendance: 100; Referees: Martinović, Nygren, Łakomy
18 October 2026; 14:00	Kyrgyzbay 6	(9–23)	Du 14	Al Inbiaat Hall, Agadir; Attendance: 100; Referees: Martinović, Nygren, Łakomy
18 October 2026; 14:00	1× (yellow card) 3× (suspension)	Report	4× (suspension)	Al Inbiaat Hall, Agadir; Attendance: 100; Referees: Martinović, Nygren, Łakomy

18 October 2026; 18:30	Morocco	37–16	United States	Al Inbiaat Hall, Agadir; Attendance: 650; Referees: Pak, Tuyizere, Hardegger
18 October 2026; 18:30	Boudjhki 12	(20–7)	Lynch 4	Al Inbiaat Hall, Agadir; Attendance: 650; Referees: Pak, Tuyizere, Hardegger
18 October 2026; 18:30	3× (suspension)	Report	6× (suspension) 1× (red card)	Al Inbiaat Hall, Agadir; Attendance: 650; Referees: Pak, Tuyizere, Hardegger

20 October 2026; 14:00	United States	29–37	Kazakhstan	Al Inbiaat Hall, Agadir; Attendance: 110; Referees: Cha, Răduț, Watson
20 October 2026; 14:00	Nakib, Schulz 6	(13–21)	Kyrgyzbay 11	Al Inbiaat Hall, Agadir; Attendance: 110; Referees: Cha, Răduț, Watson
20 October 2026; 14:00	3× (suspension)	Report	3× (suspension)	Al Inbiaat Hall, Agadir; Attendance: 110; Referees: Cha, Răduț, Watson

20 October 2026; 18:30	China	53–18	Morocco	Al Inbiaat Hall, Agadir; Attendance: 435; Referees: Kinatzidis, Hardegger, Abdelkader
20 October 2026; 18:30	Du 15	(27–7)	Boukherouk 4	Al Inbiaat Hall, Agadir; Attendance: 435; Referees: Kinatzidis, Hardegger, Abdelkader
20 October 2026; 18:30	1× (suspension)	Report	2× (suspension)	Al Inbiaat Hall, Agadir; Attendance: 435; Referees: Kinatzidis, Hardegger, Abdelkader

=== Group B ===
Pos	Team	Pld	W	D	L	GF	GA	GD	Pts	Qualification
1	Hungary	3	3	0	0	111	74	+37	6	Semifinals
2	Belarus	3	2	0	1	99	102	−3	4	5–8th place semifinals
3	Paraguay	3	1	0	2	109	120	−11	2	9–12th place semifinals
4	Guinea	3	0	0	3	98	121	−23	0	13–16th place semifinals

Source: IHF
Rules for classification: 1) points; 2) head-to-head points; 3) head-to-head goal difference; 4) head-to-head number of goals scored; 5) goal difference.

16 October 2026; 14:00	Hungary	36–24	Guinea	Salle Couverte Al Houda, Agadir; Attendance: 36; Referees: Martinović, Borge, Bartkowiak
16 October 2026; 14:00	three players 4	(24–12)	Diakité 9	Salle Couverte Al Houda, Agadir; Attendance: 36; Referees: Martinović, Borge, Bartkowiak
16 October 2026; 14:00	1× (suspension)	Report	1× (yellow card) 5× (suspension)	Salle Couverte Al Houda, Agadir; Attendance: 36; Referees: Martinović, Borge, Bartkowiak

16 October 2026; 18:30	Paraguay	35–38	Belarus	Salle Couverte Al Houda, Agadir; Attendance: 38; Referees: El Mouniri, Hardegger, Abdelkader
16 October 2026; 18:30	Devaca 7	(16–20)	Klipert 12	Salle Couverte Al Houda, Agadir; Attendance: 38; Referees: El Mouniri, Hardegger, Abdelkader
16 October 2026; 18:30	1× (yellow card) 4× (suspension)	Report	3× (suspension)	Salle Couverte Al Houda, Agadir; Attendance: 38; Referees: El Mouniri, Hardegger, Abdelkader

18 October 2026; 14:00	Belarus	20–34	Hungary	Salle Couverte Al Houda, Agadir; Attendance: 53; Referees: Fernández, Fotakidis, Watson
18 October 2026; 14:00	Klipert, Mironava 5	(8–17)	Tóth 9	Salle Couverte Al Houda, Agadir; Attendance: 53; Referees: Fernández, Fotakidis, Watson
18 October 2026; 14:00	7× (suspension)	Report	5× (suspension)	Salle Couverte Al Houda, Agadir; Attendance: 53; Referees: Fernández, Fotakidis, Watson

18 October 2026; 18:30	Paraguay	44–41	Guinea	Salle Couverte Al Houda, Agadir; Attendance: 48; Referees: Imanimbahafi, Hardegger, Kechida
18 October 2026; 18:30	Ramírez 12	(27–19)	Soumah 9	Salle Couverte Al Houda, Agadir; Attendance: 48; Referees: Imanimbahafi, Hardegger, Kechida
18 October 2026; 18:30	1× (suspension)	Report	3× (suspension)	Salle Couverte Al Houda, Agadir; Attendance: 48; Referees: Imanimbahafi, Hardegger, Kechida

20 October 2026; 14:00	Guinea	33–41	Belarus	Salle Couverte Al Houda, Agadir; Attendance: 26; Referees: Lamour, Nygren, Enache
20 October 2026; 14:00	Soumah 16	(18–18)	Mironava 12	Salle Couverte Al Houda, Agadir; Attendance: 26; Referees: Lamour, Nygren, Enache
20 October 2026; 14:00	6× (suspension)	Report	4× (suspension) 1× (red card)	Salle Couverte Al Houda, Agadir; Attendance: 26; Referees: Lamour, Nygren, Enache

20 October 2026; 18:30	Hungary	41–30	Paraguay	Salle Couverte Al Houda, Agadir; Attendance: 57; Referees: Giampietro, El Malwane, Tuyizere
20 October 2026; 18:30	Kiss, Tarjányi 8	(21–16)	Devaca 9	Salle Couverte Al Houda, Agadir; Attendance: 57; Referees: Giampietro, El Malwane, Tuyizere
20 October 2026; 18:30	2× (suspension)	Report	1× (yellow card) 5× (suspension)	Salle Couverte Al Houda, Agadir; Attendance: 57; Referees: Giampietro, El Malwane, Tuyizere

=== Group C ===
Pos	Team	Pld	W	D	L	GF	GA	GD	Pts	Qualification
1	Germany	3	3	0	0	142	57	+85	6	Semifinals
2	Uzbekistan	3	1	0	2	97	122	−25	2 (Note: Uzbekistan 2 Pts, +7 GD; Tunisia 2 Pts, −1 GD; Mexico 2 Pts, −6 GD)	5–8th place semifinals
3	Tunisia	3	1	0	2	102	115	−13	2	9–12th place semifinals
4	Mexico	3	1	0	2	81	128	−47	2	13–16th place semifinals

Source: IHF
Rules for classification: 1) points; 2) head-to-head points; 3) head-to-head goal difference; 4) head-to-head number of goals scored; 5) goal difference.
Notes:

16 October 2026; 11:45	Germany	53–12	Mexico	Salle Couverte Al Houda, Agadir; Attendance: 64; Referees: Kinatzidis, El Malwane, Tuyizere
16 October 2026; 11:45	Lemke 8	(23–7)	Gutiérrez 5	Salle Couverte Al Houda, Agadir; Attendance: 64; Referees: Kinatzidis, El Malwane, Tuyizere
16 October 2026; 11:45	1× (suspension)	Report	5× (suspension)	Salle Couverte Al Houda, Agadir; Attendance: 64; Referees: Kinatzidis, El Malwane, Tuyizere

16 October 2026; 16:15	Uzbekistan	38–41	Tunisia	Salle Couverte Al Houda, Agadir; Attendance: 68; Referees: Pak, Enache, Imanimbahafi
16 October 2026; 16:15	Imomova 13	(17–17)	Ahmed 11	Salle Couverte Al Houda, Agadir; Attendance: 68; Referees: Pak, Enache, Imanimbahafi
16 October 2026; 16:15	1× (yellow card) 7× (suspension)	Report	6× (suspension)	Salle Couverte Al Houda, Agadir; Attendance: 68; Referees: Pak, Enache, Imanimbahafi

18 October 2026; 11:45	Tunisia	26–38	Germany	Salle Couverte Al Houda, Agadir; Attendance: 78; Referees: Giampietro, El Malwane, Bartkowiak
18 October 2026; 11:45	Ahmed 7	(13–20)	Lueg 9	Salle Couverte Al Houda, Agadir; Attendance: 78; Referees: Giampietro, El Malwane, Bartkowiak
18 October 2026; 11:45	10× (suspension) 1× (red card)	Report	1× (yellow card) 2× (suspension)	Salle Couverte Al Houda, Agadir; Attendance: 78; Referees: Giampietro, El Malwane, Bartkowiak

18 October 2026; 16:15	Uzbekistan	40–30	Mexico	Salle Couverte Al Houda, Agadir; Attendance: 44; Referees: Lamour, Cha, Răduț
18 October 2026; 16:15	Imomova 6	(21–17)	Quiñones 8	Salle Couverte Al Houda, Agadir; Attendance: 44; Referees: Lamour, Cha, Răduț
18 October 2026; 16:15	1× (yellow card) 4× (suspension)	Report	3× (suspension)	Salle Couverte Al Houda, Agadir; Attendance: 44; Referees: Lamour, Cha, Răduț

20 October 2026; 11:45	Mexico	39–35	Tunisia	Salle Couverte Al Houda, Agadir; Attendance: 43; Referees: El Mouniri, Pavićević, Łakomy
20 October 2026; 11:45	Gutiérrez 10	(18–17)	Jarou 7	Salle Couverte Al Houda, Agadir; Attendance: 43; Referees: El Mouniri, Pavićević, Łakomy
20 October 2026; 11:45	2× (suspension)	Report	6× (suspension)	Salle Couverte Al Houda, Agadir; Attendance: 43; Referees: El Mouniri, Pavićević, Łakomy

20 October 2026; 16:15	Germany	51–19	Uzbekistan	Salle Couverte Al Houda, Agadir; Attendance: 57; Referees: Cournil, Imanimbahafi, Welin
20 October 2026; 16:15	Nagel 8	(27–11)	Imomova 5	Salle Couverte Al Houda, Agadir; Attendance: 57; Referees: Cournil, Imanimbahafi, Welin
20 October 2026; 16:15	2× (suspension)	Report	1× (yellow card) 4× (suspension)	Salle Couverte Al Houda, Agadir; Attendance: 57; Referees: Cournil, Imanimbahafi, Welin

=== Group D ===
Pos	Team	Pld	W	D	L	GF	GA	GD	Pts	Qualification
1	Russia	3	3	0	0	112	75	+37	6	Semifinals
2	Egypt	3	2	0	1	94	91	+3	4	5–8th place semifinals
3	Switzerland	3	1	0	2	101	79	+22	2	9–12th place semifinals
4	Argentina	3	0	0	3	63	125	−62	0	13–16th place semifinals

Source: IHF
Rules for classification: 1) points; 2) head-to-head points; 3) head-to-head goal difference; 4) head-to-head number of goals scored; 5) goal difference.

16 October 2026; 11:45	Argentina	20–48	Switzerland	Al Inbiaat Hall, Agadir; Attendance: 105; Referees: Fotakidis, Răduț, Watson
16 October 2026; 11:45	Albino, Maschetto 4	(10–25)	Hasler 9	Al Inbiaat Hall, Agadir; Attendance: 105; Referees: Fotakidis, Răduț, Watson
16 October 2026; 11:45	1× (yellow card) 7× (suspension)	Report	2× (suspension) 1× (red card)	Al Inbiaat Hall, Agadir; Attendance: 105; Referees: Fotakidis, Răduț, Watson

16 October 2026; 16:15	Egypt	29–41	Russia	Al Inbiaat Hall, Agadir; Attendance: 315; Referees: Lamour, Cha, Nygren
16 October 2026; 16:15	Mohamed, Shalaby 7	(11–21)	Astafeva 7	Al Inbiaat Hall, Agadir; Attendance: 315; Referees: Lamour, Cha, Nygren
16 October 2026; 16:15	5× (suspension)	Report	5× (suspension)	Al Inbiaat Hall, Agadir; Attendance: 315; Referees: Lamour, Cha, Nygren

18 October 2026; 11:45	Russia	41–21	Argentina	Al Inbiaat Hall, Agadir; Attendance: 150; Referees: Kinatzidis, Pavićević, Enache
18 October 2026; 11:45	Sapozhnikova 9	(20–12)	Repetto 5	Al Inbiaat Hall, Agadir; Attendance: 150; Referees: Kinatzidis, Pavićević, Enache
18 October 2026; 11:45	5× (suspension)	Report	4× (suspension)	Al Inbiaat Hall, Agadir; Attendance: 150; Referees: Kinatzidis, Pavićević, Enache

18 October 2026; 16:15	Egypt	29–28	Switzerland	Al Inbiaat Hall, Agadir; Attendance: 205; Referees: Cournil, El Mouniri, Welin
18 October 2026; 16:15	Mohamed 7	(14–14)	Muheim, Lehmann 5	Al Inbiaat Hall, Agadir; Attendance: 205; Referees: Cournil, El Mouniri, Welin
18 October 2026; 16:15	1× (yellow card) 3× (suspension)	Report	1× (yellow card) 3× (suspension)	Al Inbiaat Hall, Agadir; Attendance: 205; Referees: Cournil, El Mouniri, Welin

20 October 2026; 11:45	Switzerland	25–30	Russia	Al Inbiaat Hall, Agadir; Attendance: 180; Referees: Fernández, Martinović, Borge
20 October 2026; 11:45	Häusler 5	(11–13)	Smirnova 9	Al Inbiaat Hall, Agadir; Attendance: 180; Referees: Fernández, Martinović, Borge
20 October 2026; 11:45	2× (suspension)	Report	4× (suspension)	Al Inbiaat Hall, Agadir; Attendance: 180; Referees: Fernández, Martinović, Borge

20 October 2026; 16:15	Argentina	22–36	Egypt	Al Inbiaat Hall, Agadir; Attendance: 90; Referees: Pak, Bartkowiak, Kechida
20 October 2026; 16:15	Sica 6	(7–18)	Abdelhalim 9	Al Inbiaat Hall, Agadir; Attendance: 90; Referees: Pak, Bartkowiak, Kechida
20 October 2026; 16:15	4× (suspension)	Report	3× (suspension)	Al Inbiaat Hall, Agadir; Attendance: 90; Referees: Pak, Bartkowiak, Kechida

== Placement games ==
=== 13–16th place bracket ===
13–16th place semifinals
22 October
United States	11
Guinea	49
22 October
Mexico	17
Argentina	35

13th place game
24 October
Guinea	37
Argentina	30
15th place game
24 October
United States	24
Mexico	49

==== 13–16th place semifinals ====
22 October 2026; 11:45	United States	11–49	Guinea	Salle Couverte Al Houda, Agadir; Attendance: 29; Referees: Cha, Imanimbahafi, Abdelkader
22 October 2026; 11:45	De Ipola Fernandez, Nakib 3	(4–27)	Mansaré 14	Salle Couverte Al Houda, Agadir; Attendance: 29; Referees: Cha, Imanimbahafi, Abdelkader
22 October 2026; 11:45	5× (suspension) 1× (red card)	Report	2× (suspension)	Salle Couverte Al Houda, Agadir; Attendance: 29; Referees: Cha, Imanimbahafi, Abdelkader

22 October 2026; 14:00	Mexico	17–35	Argentina	Salle Couverte Al Houda, Agadir; Attendance: 42; Referees: Fotakidis, Hardegger, Welin
22 October 2026; 14:00	Gutiérrez 8	(7–18)	Repetto 7	Salle Couverte Al Houda, Agadir; Attendance: 42; Referees: Fotakidis, Hardegger, Welin
22 October 2026; 14:00	1× (suspension)	Report	3× (suspension)	Salle Couverte Al Houda, Agadir; Attendance: 42; Referees: Fotakidis, Hardegger, Welin

==== 15th place game ====
24 October 2026; 09:30	United States	24–49	Mexico	Salle Couverte Al Houda, Agadir; Attendance: 37; Referees: Giampietro, Łakomy, Hardegger
24 October 2026; 09:30	Agoston 6	(12–25)	Gutiérrez 13	Salle Couverte Al Houda, Agadir; Attendance: 37; Referees: Giampietro, Łakomy, Hardegger
24 October 2026; 09:30	1× (suspension)	Report		Salle Couverte Al Houda, Agadir; Attendance: 37; Referees: Giampietro, Łakomy, Hardegger

==== 13th place game ====
24 October 2026; 11:45	Guinea	37–30	Argentina	Salle Couverte Al Houda, Agadir; Attendance: 43; Referees: Bartkowiak, Răduț, Tuyizere
24 October 2026; 11:45	Soumah 12	(18–15)	Albino, Repetto 7	Salle Couverte Al Houda, Agadir; Attendance: 43; Referees: Bartkowiak, Răduț, Tuyizere
24 October 2026; 11:45	6× (suspension) 1× (red card)	Report	4× (suspension)	Salle Couverte Al Houda, Agadir; Attendance: 43; Referees: Bartkowiak, Răduț, Tuyizere

=== 9–12th place bracket ===
9–12th place semifinals
22 October
Morocco	31
Paraguay	42
22 October
Tunisia	21
Switzerland	31

Ninth place game
24 October
Paraguay	24
Switzerland	31
11th place game
24 October
Morocco	21
Tunisia	27

==== 9–12th place semifinals ====
22 October 2026; 11:45	Tunisia	21–31	Switzerland	Al Inbiaat Hall, Agadir; Attendance: 100; Referees: Cournil, El Mouniri, Welin
22 October 2026; 11:45	Gara 7	(14–13)	Lehmann 6	Al Inbiaat Hall, Agadir; Attendance: 100; Referees: Cournil, El Mouniri, Welin
22 October 2026; 11:45	2× (suspension)	Report	1× (suspension)	Al Inbiaat Hall, Agadir; Attendance: 100; Referees: Cournil, El Mouniri, Welin

22 October 2026; 14:00	Morocco	31–42	Paraguay	Al Inbiaat Hall, Agadir; Attendance: 150; Referees: Pak, Enache, Kechida
22 October 2026; 14:00	Boudjkhi, Boukherouk 8	(18–18)	Devaca, González 10	Al Inbiaat Hall, Agadir; Attendance: 150; Referees: Pak, Enache, Kechida
22 October 2026; 14:00	3× (suspension)	Report	1× (yellow card) 2× (suspension)	Al Inbiaat Hall, Agadir; Attendance: 150; Referees: Pak, Enache, Kechida

==== 11th place game ====
24 October 2026; 14:45	Morocco	21–27	Tunisia	Al Inbiaat Hall, Agadir; Attendance: 150; Referees: Lamour, Pavićević, Imanimbahafi
24 October 2026; 14:45	Boukherouk, Hajji 5	(10–13)	Sghairi 7	Al Inbiaat Hall, Agadir; Attendance: 150; Referees: Lamour, Pavićević, Imanimbahafi
24 October 2026; 14:45	1× (suspension)	Report	1× (suspension)	Al Inbiaat Hall, Agadir; Attendance: 150; Referees: Lamour, Pavićević, Imanimbahafi

==== Ninth place game ====
24 October 2026; 12:30	Paraguay	24–31	Switzerland	Al Inbiaat Hall, Agadir; Attendance: 100; Referees: Fernández, Kinatzidis, Nygren
24 October 2026; 12:30	Parra, Ramírez 5	(14–14)	Häusler 8	Al Inbiaat Hall, Agadir; Attendance: 100; Referees: Fernández, Kinatzidis, Nygren
24 October 2026; 12:30	1× (yellow card) 2× (suspension)	Report	1× (suspension)	Al Inbiaat Hall, Agadir; Attendance: 100; Referees: Fernández, Kinatzidis, Nygren

=== 5–8th place bracket ===
5–8th place semifinals
22 October
Kazakhstan	31
Belarus	56
22 October
Uzbekistan	29
Egypt	45

Fifth place game
24 October
Belarus	25
Egypt	34
Seventh place game
24 October
Kazakhstan	41
Uzbekistan	40

==== 5–8th place semifinals ====
22 October 2026; 16:15	Kazakhstan	31–56	Belarus	Salle Couverte Al Houda, Agadir; Attendance: 21; Referees: El Malwane, Bartkowiak, Răduț
22 October 2026; 16:15	Kyrgyzbay 9	(15–27)	Mironava 11	Salle Couverte Al Houda, Agadir; Attendance: 21; Referees: El Malwane, Bartkowiak, Răduț
22 October 2026; 16:15	1× (yellow card) 4× (suspension)	Report	5× (suspension)	Salle Couverte Al Houda, Agadir; Attendance: 21; Referees: El Malwane, Bartkowiak, Răduț

22 October 2026; 18:45	Uzbekistan	29–45	Egypt	Salle Couverte Al Houda, Agadir; Attendance: 96; Referees: Martinović, Łakomy, Tuyizere
22 October 2026; 18:45	Rasuljonova 8	(15–22)	three players 8	Salle Couverte Al Houda, Agadir; Attendance: 96; Referees: Martinović, Łakomy, Tuyizere
22 October 2026; 18:45	2× (suspension)	Report	2× (suspension)	Salle Couverte Al Houda, Agadir; Attendance: 96; Referees: Martinović, Łakomy, Tuyizere

==== Seventh place game ====
24 October 2026; 14:00	Kazakhstan	41–40	Uzbekistan	Salle Couverte Al Houda, Agadir; Attendance: 39; Referees: El Malwane, Enache, Kechida
24 October 2026; 14:00	Kyrgyzbay 13	(18–17)	Abdurakhmanova, Imomova 7	Salle Couverte Al Houda, Agadir; Attendance: 39; Referees: El Malwane, Enache, Kechida
24 October 2026; 14:00	2× (suspension)	Report	1× (yellow card) 5× (suspension)	Salle Couverte Al Houda, Agadir; Attendance: 39; Referees: El Malwane, Enache, Kechida

==== Fifth place game ====
24 October 2026; 16:15	Belarus	25–34	Egypt	Salle Couverte Al Houda, Agadir; Attendance: 45; Referees: Martinović, Borge, Abdelkader
24 October 2026; 16:15	Kaliada 6	(14–19)	Shalaby 9	Salle Couverte Al Houda, Agadir; Attendance: 45; Referees: Martinović, Borge, Abdelkader
24 October 2026; 16:15	5× (suspension)	Report	1× (yellow card) 2× (suspension)	Salle Couverte Al Houda, Agadir; Attendance: 45; Referees: Martinović, Borge, Abdelkader

== Knockout stage ==
=== Bracket ===
Semi-finals
22 October
China	36
Hungary	40
22 October
Germany	34
Russia	31

Final
24 October
Hungary	32
Germany	37
Third place
24 October
China	33
Russia	39

=== Semifinals ===
22 October 2026; 16:15	China	36–40	Hungary	Al Inbiaat Hall, Agadir; Attendance: 320; Referees: Kinatzidis, Pavićević, Borge
22 October 2026; 16:15	Song 8	(19–18)	Kiss, Molnár 10	Al Inbiaat Hall, Agadir; Attendance: 320; Referees: Kinatzidis, Pavićević, Borge
22 October 2026; 16:15	4× (suspension)	Report	4× (suspension)	Al Inbiaat Hall, Agadir; Attendance: 320; Referees: Kinatzidis, Pavićević, Borge

22 October 2026; 18:45	Germany	34–31	Russia	Al Inbiaat Hall, Agadir; Attendance: 650; Referees: Lamour, Nygren, Hardegger
22 October 2026; 18:45	Lueg 10	(16–16)	Sapozhnikova 9	Al Inbiaat Hall, Agadir; Attendance: 650; Referees: Lamour, Nygren, Hardegger
22 October 2026; 18:45	5× (suspension)	Report	3× (suspension)	Al Inbiaat Hall, Agadir; Attendance: 650; Referees: Lamour, Nygren, Hardegger

=== Third place game ===
24 October 2026; 17:00	China	33–39	Russia	Al Inbiaat Hall, Agadir; Attendance: 650; Referees: Fotakidis, Hardegger, Watson
24 October 2026; 17:00	Sun 11	(19–18)	Predybailova 8	Al Inbiaat Hall, Agadir; Attendance: 650; Referees: Fotakidis, Hardegger, Watson
24 October 2026; 17:00	1× (yellow card) 5× (suspension) 1× (red card)	Report	1× (yellow card) 4× (suspension)	Al Inbiaat Hall, Agadir; Attendance: 650; Referees: Fotakidis, Hardegger, Watson

=== Final ===
24 October 2026; 19:30	Hungary	32–37	Germany	Al Inbiaat Hall, Agadir; Attendance: 1,350; Referees: Cournil, El Mouniri, Welin
24 October 2026; 19:30	Molnár 9	(15–17)	Sieber 8	Al Inbiaat Hall, Agadir; Attendance: 1,350; Referees: Cournil, El Mouniri, Welin
24 October 2026; 19:30	1× (yellow card) 6× (suspension)	Report	3× (suspension)	Al Inbiaat Hall, Agadir; Attendance: 1,350; Referees: Cournil, El Mouniri, Welin

== Final ranking ==
Rank	Team
1st place, gold medalist(s)	Germany
2nd place, silver medalist(s)	Hungary
3rd place, bronze medalist(s)	Russia
4	China
5	Egypt
6	Belarus
7	Kazakhstan
8	Uzbekistan
9	Switzerland
10	Paraguay
11	Tunisia
12	Morocco
13	Guinea
14	Argentina
15	Mexico
16	United States

== Statistics and awards ==
=== Top goalscorers ===
Rank	Name	Goals	Shots	%
1	(China) Du Meishan	54	81	67
2	(Kazakhstan) Nurdana Kyrgyzbay	53	85	62
3	(Guinea) Fatoumata Soumah	45	72	63
4	(China) Sun Ruixue	40	61	66
4	(Mexico) Natalia Gutiérrez	40	63	63
6	(Guinea) Yarie Mansaré	39	64	61
7	(Uzbekistan) Fazilat Imomova	35	61	57
8	(Germany) Nora Lueg	34	44	77
8	(Paraguay) Tiziana Devaca	34	56	61
8	(Belarus) Anastasiya Mironava	34	51	67

Source: IHF

=== Top goalkeepers ===
Rank	Name	%	Saves	Shots
1	(Egypt) Nourhan El-Shahed	44	29	66
2	(Germany) Mercy Hacker	40	36	91
3	(China) Wu Na	38	21	55
3	(Germany) Jana Skill	38	40	105
3	(Hungary) Dóra Tötös	38	41	108
6	(Switzerland) Anna Stauffacher	35	31	89
6	(Belarus) Valeryia Statsevich	35	32	92
8	(Paraguay) Alejandra Caceres	33	61	183
9	(Hungary) Boglárka Tóth	32	23	71
10	(Russia) Varvara Novikova	31	24	77

Source: IHF

=== Awards ===
The All-star Team was announced on 24 October 2026.

Position	Player
Goalkeeper	(Germany) Mercy Hacker
Right wing	(Germany) Nora Lueg
Right back	(Germany) Taya Nagel
Centre back	(China) Song Yiran
Left back	(Russia) Elizaveta Sapozhnikova
Left wing	(Russia) Ekaterina Astafeva
Pivot	(China) Li Shiman
MVP	(Hungary) Hanna Molnár
