= Peter Mühlematter =

Swiss handball administrator (born 1945)

Peter Mühlematter (born 2 January 1945 in Bern) is a Swiss handball administrator. While working as manager for a Swiss printing machine manufacturer, he started his IHF career as member of the IHF Commission for Development and Public Relations before becoming a member and then President of the IHF Commission of Organising and Competition. Thus, by virtue of his office, he had also been a member of the IHF Council. At the IHF Congress in 2004, he was elected Secretary General of the International Handball Federation (IHF).

During the 2009 World Men's Handball Championship a conflict emerged between Mühlematter and the President of the IHF, Hassan Moustafa.
