= IHF President's Development Award =

- Sport: Handball
- Awarded for: Development and spread of Handball
- Local name: Prix du président du développement de l'IHF (French)
- Presented by: International Handball Federation (IHF)

History
- First award: 2017
- Editions: 3
- First winner: Developed Federations – Handball Federation of Russia; Emerging Federations – (Mongolia) Mongolian Handball Federation
- Most recent: Developed Federations – (Czech Republic) Czech Handball Association; Emerging Federations – (Colombia) Colombian Handball Federation
- Website: ihf.info

IHF President's Development Award is awarded by the International Handball Federation to its member federations for the spread and development of handball in their own countries and/or through the world. It is awarded by the IHF President or his representative every two year at the IHF Congress.

== History ==
The IHF President’s Development Award is awarded to IHF member federations. It is granted to two Member Federations every two years at the IHF Congress. Formerly it is known as the Hans Baumann Trophy until 2015.

It is awarded for particular services to the development and spread of handball in the Member Federations’ own countries and/or throughout the world. The recipients are selected and the award granted by the IHF Council at the recommendation of the IHF Executive Committee. After invitation by the IHF, Member Federations may submit a completed IHF questionnaire no later than six months before the Congress.

The Member Federations receiving the award are given a diploma and a small replica of the award. The IHF President’s Development Award is granted to two applicants on two levels:

- Handball developed countries
- Emerging federations

== Award winners ==
=== Handball developed countries ===
Following is the list of winners of IHF President's Development Award for Handball developed countries:

| Year | Winner | Other applicants |
|---|---|---|
| 2017 | Handball Federation of Russia | Norway, Greece, Romania, Serbia, Ukraine |
| 2019 | (Norway) Norwegian Handball Federation | Netherlands, Norway, Romania |
| 2021 | (Czech Republic) Czech Handball Association | South Korea |

=== Emerging federations ===
Following is the list of winners of IHF President's Development Award for Handball emerging federations:

| Year | Winner | Other applicants |
|---|---|---|
| 2017 | (Mongolia) Mongolian Handball Federation | Costa Rica, Haiti, Kyrgyzstan, Kosovo, Liberia, Zimbabwe, Trinidad and Tobago |
| 2019 | Cuba Handball Federation | No application received from any country, IHF Executive Committee recommended to grant the award to Cuba due to their achievements in 2018-19 |
| 2021 | (Colombia) Colombian Handball Federation | No other applicants |
