= Gösta Björk =

Swedish sports administrator

Gösta Björk (Sweden)

1st President of International Handball Federation
- In office 12 July 1946 – 9 September 1950
- Preceded by: Position created
- Succeeded by: Hans Baumann

3rd President of Swedish Handball Federation
- In office 1939–1948
- Preceded by: Ernst Eriksson
- Succeeded by: Paul Högberg

Personal details
- Born: 5 November 1900 Stockholm, Sweden
- Died: 11 February 1955 (aged 54) Stockholm, Sweden
- Profession: Sports administrator

Gösta Björk (5 November 1900 – 11 February 1955) was a Swedish sports administrator who served as the first President of International Handball Federation (IHF).

He was also the President of Swedish Handball Federation from 1939 to 1948. In 1950, he was nominated as Secretary General of the Swedish Olympic Committee. He died on 11 February 1955 after a long illness. He was succeeded by

Preceded by None (creation)	IHF President; 1946 - 1950	Succeeded by Hans Baumann
