= Egypt men's national under-17 handball team =

Egypt

Information
- Nickname: The Pharaohs
- Association: Egyptian Handball Federation
- Coach: Emad Ibrahim

Colours
1st	2nd
- Last updated on Unknown.

Egypt men's national under-17 handball team
Medal record

IHF Men's U17 Handball World Championship
Silver medal – second place	2025 Morocco	

The Egypt national youth handball team is the under-17s national team representing Egypt in the international handball competitions and is controlled by the Egyptian Handball Federation.

== Competitive record ==
IHF Men's U17 Handball World Championship
Games	Round	Position	Pld	W	D	L	GF	GA	GD
2025 Morocco	Final	Runners-up	5	4	0	1	183	140	+43
Total	Qualified: 1/1		5	4	0	1	183	140	+43

== See also ==
- Egypt men's national handball team
- Egypt men's national under-21 handball team
- Egypt men's national under-19 handball team
- Egypt men's national beach handball team
- Egypt national wheelchair handball team
