= IHF Certificate of Merit =

The IHF Certificate of Merit is awarded to individuals working outside the International Handball Federation in recognition of their particular contribution to promoting the sport of handball.

The Certificate of Merit is a document signed by the IHF President. The recipient is selected by the Council at the recommendation of the Executive Committee and the certificate is awarded by the IHF President or his representative.
