= IHF Plaque of Merit =

The Plaque of Merit is awarded to institutions and organisations outside the IHF.

== Levels ==
There are two levels: gold and silver.

== Gold Plaque of Merit ==
The Plaque of Merit in Gold recognises above-average services, over many years, to the development of handball and/or in association with the IHF.

=== Recipient of IHF Gold Plaque of Merit ===
Year	Recipient	Country / Unit
2002	Marie-Christine Gillet	Taraflex

== Silver Plaque of Merit ==
The Plaque of Merit in Silver is awarded for particular contributions to the development of handball and/or in association with the IHF.

== Award ==
The recipients are selected and the plaques awarded by the Council. The Executive Committee, the Council, the continental federations and member federations are all entitled to suggest recipients for the awards.
