= IHF Cup of Honour and certificate =

Award for contributions to the sport of handball

The IHF Cup of Honour and a corresponding certificate is awarded to eminent personalities as well as national and international federations.

The Cup of Honour recognises extraordinary contributions to the development of the sport of handball.

The recipient is selected by the Executive Committee and the cup together with the certificate awarded by the IHF President.
