= IHF Women's U16 Handball World Championship =

Women's U16 handball tournament

- Upcoming season or competition: 2026 IHF Women's U16 Handball World Championship
- Sport: Handball
- Founded: 2026
- Founder: International Handball Federation
- First season: 2026
- No. of teams: 16
- Continents: 5
- Most recent champion: Germany (1st title)
- Most titles: Germany (1st title)

The IHF Women's U16 Handball World Championship will be the official competition for women's national handball teams under age 16. It will be organized by the International Handball Federation (IHF) starting in 2026.

== Tournaments ==
Year	Host	Gold medal game			Bronze medal game		
Year	Host	Gold	Score	Silver	Bronze	Score	Fourth place
2026; Details	(Morocco); Agadir	Germany	37–32	Hungary	Russia	39–33	China

== Participating nations ==
Nation	(Morocco) 2026	Years
Argentina	14th	1
Belarus	6th	1
China	4th	1
Egypt	5th	1
Germany	1st	1
Guinea	13th	1
Hungary	2nd	1
Kazakhstan	7th	1
Morocco	12th	1
Mexico	15th	1
Paraguay	10th	1
Russia	3rd	1
Switzerland	9th	1
Tunisia	11th	1
United States	16th	1
Uzbekistan	8th	1
Total	16	
