= Swedish Handball Federation =

National sporting association

Swedish Handball Federation Swedish: Svenska Handbollförbundet SHF
- IOC nation: Sweden (SWE)
- Sport: handball
- Other sports: beach handball; wheelchair handball
- Official website: www.svenskhandboll.se

History
- Year of formation: 25 November 1930; 95 years ago

Affiliations
- International federation: International Handball Federation (IHF)
- IHF member since: 1946; 80 years ago
- Continental association: European Handball Federation
- National Olympic Committee: Swedish Olympic Committee
- Other affiliation(s): Swedish Sports Confederation

Governing body
- President: Fredrik Rapp (Sweden)

Headquarters
- Address: Idrottens Hus SE-114 73 Stockholm
- Country: Sweden
- Secretary General: Robert Wedberg (Sweden)

Finance
- Sponsors: ATG; Craft; Gjensidige; Boozt; Bauhaus; Bring; Sparbanken Skåne; Lidl

The Swedish Handball Federation (Swedish: Svenska Handbollförbundet, SHF) is the national handball association in Sweden.

The Swedish Handball Federation was founded out of the Swedish Game Association on 25 November 1930 and joined the Swedish Sports Confederation (Swedish: Riksidrottsförbundet, RF) in 1931. It is also a member of the Swedish Olympic Committee (Swedish: Sveriges Olympiska Kommitté, SOK), the European Handball Federation (EHF) and the International Handball Federation (IHF). Its headquarters are in Stockholm.

In 1948, the Swedish Handball Federation set up a basketball section, which existed until the October 1952 establishment of the Swedish Basketball Federation.

Its chairperson, since August 2016, is Fredrik Rapp.

== SHF Presidents ==
No.	Name	Term
1.	Harald Schulze	1930–1935
2.	Erik Balck	1935–1939
Interim	Ernst Eriksson	1939
3.	Gösta Björk	1939–1948
4.	Paul Högberg	1948–1967
5.	Curt Wadmark	1967–1973
6.	Allan Adolfsson	1973–1976
7.	Åke Pernelid	1976–1979
8.	Staffan Holmqvist	1979–1995
9.	Per-Olof Söderblom	1995–2006
10.	Arne Elovsson	2006–2008
11.	Hans Vestberg	2008–2016
12.	Fredrik Rapp	2016–present

== Competitions hosted ==
=== International ===
- 1954 World Men's Handball Championship
- 1967 World Men's Handball Championship
- 1977 Men's Junior World Handball Championship
- 1979 Men's Junior World Handball Championship
- 1993 World Men's Handball Championship
- 2011 World Men's Handball Championship
- 2023 World Men's Handball Championship
- 2023 World Women's Handball Championship

=== Continental ===
- 2002 European Men's Handball Championship
- 2006 European Women's Handball Championship
- 2016 European Women's Handball Championship
- 2020 European Men's Handball Championship
