= International Handball Federation =

International sports governing body for handball

- Sport: Handball
- Other sports: Beach handball; Wheelchair handball
- Official website: ihf.info

History
- Preceding organisations: International Amateur Athletic Federation (1926–1928); International Amateur Handball Federation (1928–1946)
- Year of formation: 12 July 1946; 80 years ago

Demographics
- Membership size: 209 members

Affiliations
- Other affiliation(s): International Olympic Committee; Association of Summer Olympic International Federations

Governance
- President: Hassan Moustafa
- Honorary president: Erwin Lanc

Headquarters
- Address: Peter Merian-Strasse 23, P.O. Box CH-4002, Basel
- Country: Switzerland
- General director: Amal Khalifa
- Official language(s): English, French and German
- Main organ: IHF Congress; IHF Council

Finance
- Company status: Active
- Operating income: ▲CHF 7.24 million or US$ 7.84 million (in 2022) ▲CHF 2.10 million or US$ 2.28 million (in 2023)
- Sponsors: Gerflor; Hummel International; Sportfive; Molten Corporation

Regions
- Africa; Asia; Europe; North America and Caribbean; Oceania; South and Central America

The International Handball Federation (IHF) is the administrative and controlling body for handball and beach handball. IHF is responsible for the organisation of handball's major international tournaments, notably the IHF World Men's Handball Championship, which commenced in 1938, and the IHF World Women's Handball Championship, which commenced in 1957.

IHF was founded in 1946 to oversee international competitions. Headquartered in Basel, its membership now comprises 209 national federations. Each member country must each also be a member of one of the six regional confederations: Africa, Asia, Europe, North America and Caribbean, Oceania, and South and Central America. Hassan Moustafa from Egypt has been President of the IHF since 26 November 2000.

== History ==
The precursor to IHF, the International Amateur Handball Federation (IAHF) was founded in Amsterdam during the 1928 Olympic Games, but was dissolved after WWII.

From 10-13 July 1946, the IHF Founding Congress was held at Palace Hotel in Copenhagen, Denmark. It was attended by 35 representatives of eight national federations, following a joint proposal and invitation from Denmark and Sweden, with the founding members being these two countries along with six others; Finland, France, Norway, Netherlands, Poland, and Switzerland.

On 12 July 1946 the IHF was officially certified at the IHF Founding Congress, with the first president of IHF being Gösta Björk from Sweden. Björk was replaced in 1950 by Hans Baumann from Switzerland. In 1954, the first IHF Men's World Championship, was conducted under the aegis of the IHF, in Sweden with the participation of six national teams. In 1957, the first IHF World Women's Handball Championship was held in SFR Yugoslavia with the participation of nine national teams. Handball was included in the Olympic Games for the first time under the auspices of IHF in Munich 1972 (men's tournament) and Montreal 1976 (women's tournament).

== Structure ==
=== Laws and governance ===
IHF is headquartered in Basel, and is a federation established under the Law of Switzerland. IHF's supreme body is the IHF Congress, an assembly made up of representatives from each affiliated member association. Each national handball association has one vote, regardless of its size or handballing strength. The Congress assembles in ordinary session once in two years (odd years) after the IHF World Men's Handball Championship. The congress makes decisions relating to IHF's governing statutes and their method of implementation and application. Only the Congress can pass changes to IHF's statutes. The congress approves the annual report, and decides on the acceptance of new national associations and holds elections. Congress elects the President of IHF, its General Secretary, and the other members of the IHF Council. IHF's Council, chaired by the President, is the main decision-making body of the organisation in the intervals of Congress. The Council is composed of 18 people: the President, 5 Vice Presidents, and 12 members. The Council is the body that decides which country will host the World Championship. The President and General Secretary are the main officeholders of IHF, and are in charge of its daily administration, carried out by the General Secretariat. Hassan Moustafa is the current president, appointed in the year 2000 at the 28th Ordinary IHF Congress.

=== Six confederations and 209 national associations ===
The IHF is composed of six continental federations which organize continental championships held every other second year:

- African Handball Confederation
- Asian Handball Federation
- European Handball Federation
- North America and the Caribbean Handball Confederation
- Oceania Continent Handball Federation
- South and Central America Handball Confederation

In addition to continental competitions between national teams, the federations arrange international tournaments between club teams.

Until 2017, there were five continental confederations. On 14 January 2018, the IHF Council divided the Pan-American Confederation into the North America and the Caribbean Handball Confederation and the South and Central America Handball Confederation. The authority to divide a continental confederation was assigned to the IHF Congress, but the 36th IHF Congress in 2017 authorized the IHF Council to divide the Pan-American Team Handball Federation.

== IHF presidents ==
| No. | Name | Country | Term |
|---|---|---|---|
| 1. | Gösta Björk | Sweden | 11 July 1946 – 9 September 1950 |
| 2. | Hans Baumann† | Switzerland | 9 September 1950 – 9 February 1971 |
| Interim | Paul Högberg | Sweden | 9 February 1971 – 23 August 1972 |
| 3. | Paul Högberg | Sweden | 23 August 1972 – 25 July 1984 |
| 4. | Erwin Lanc | Austria | 25 July 1984 – 26 November 2000 |
| 5. | Hassan Moustafa | Egypt | 26 November 2000 – present |

† Hans Baumann died in office on 9 February 1971 due to illness.

== IHF Executive committee ==
The following is the IHF Executive Committee for the term 2025 — 2029.

| Designation | Name |
|---|---|
| President | (Egypt) Hassan Moustafa |
| 1st Vice-president | (France) Philippe Bana |
| Treasurer | (Sweden) Anna Rapp |
| Executive members | (Romania) Narcisa Lecușanu |
| Executive members | (Spain) Paco Blázquez García |
| Managing director | (Egypt) Amal Khalifa |

== IHF Council ==
The IHF Council is the IHF's main decision-making body between meetings of the IHF Congress. It is currently serving a 2021—2025 term.

== IHF commissions ==
| IHF Commission of Coaching and Methods | (Germany) Dietrich Späte |
| IHF Medical Commission | (Cameroon) Dr. Yannick Mossus |
| IHF Commission for Development | (Croatia) Tomislav Grahovac |
| IHF Athletes' Commission | (Spain) Gonzalo Pérez de Vargas |
| IHF Arbitration Commission | (Croatia) Lovro Badzim |
| IHF Arbitration Tribunal | (Montenegro) Zoran Radojičić |
| IHF Ethics Commission | (Egypt) Hussein Moustafa Fathy |

- Italics means Acting Chairperson

== IHF tournaments ==
Handball

- IHF World Men's Handball Championship
- IHF World Women's Handball Championship
- IHF Men's U21 Handball World Championship
- IHF Women's U20 Handball World Championship
- IHF Men's U19 Handball World Championship
- IHF Women's U18 Handball World Championship
- IHF Men's U17 Handball World Championship
- IHF Women's U16 Handball World Championship
- IHF Emerging Nations Championship
- IHF Inter-Continental Trophy
- IHF Confederations Cup (proposed)

Beach handball

- IHF Beach Handball World Championship
- IHF Youth Beach Handball World Championship
- IHF Beach Handball Global Tour

Wheelchair handball

- IHF Wheelchair Handball World Championship

Club handball

- IHF Men's Super Globe
- IHF Women's Super Globe

Multi-sport events

- Handball at the Summer Olympics
- Handball at the Youth Olympic Games (Defunct)
- Beach handball at the World Games
- Beach handball at the World Beach Games
- Beach handball at the Youth Olympic Games

== Medals ==
As of 1 November 2025 (After 121 Events)

=== Events ===
1. IHF World Men's Handball Championship (1938–2025), 29 editions
2. IHF World Women's Handball Championship (1957–2023), 26 editions
3. IHF Men's Junior World Championship (1977–2025), 24 editions
4. IHF Women's Junior World Championship (1977–2024), 23 editions
5. IHF Men's Youth World Championship (2005–2023), 9 editions
6. IHF Women's Youth World Championship (2005–2024), 9 editions
7. IHF Men's U17 World Championship (2025–), 1 edition

=== With Precursors ===
| Rank | Nation | Gold | Silver | Bronze | Total |
|---|---|---|---|---|---|
| 1 | Russia (RUS) | 31 | 12 | 4 | 47 |
| 2 | Denmark (DEN) | 16 | 18 | 14 | 48 |
| 3 | France (FRA) | 14 | 7 | 8 | 29 |
| 4 | Germany (GER) | 12 | 10 | 12 | 34 |
| 5 | Sweden (SWE) | 9 | 7 | 9 | 25 |
| 6 | Romania (ROU) | 8 | 2 | 7 | 17 |
| 7 | Serbia (SRB) | 7 | 9 | 11 | 27 |
| 8 | Norway (NOR) | 6 | 10 | 6 | 22 |
| 9 | Spain (ESP) | 5 | 8 | 5 | 18 |
| 10 | South Korea (KOR) | 3 | 5 | 8 | 16 |
| 11 | Hungary (HUN) | 2 | 12 | 8 | 22 |
| 12 | Croatia (CRO) | 2 | 7 | 3 | 12 |
| 13 | Czech Republic (CZE) | 2 | 3 | 4 | 9 |
| 14 | Egypt (EGY) | 2 | 1 | 2 | 5 |
| 15 | Netherlands (NED) | 1 | 1 | 4 | 6 |
| 16 | Brazil (BRA) | 1 | 0 | 0 | 1 |
| 17 | Poland (POL) | 0 | 1 | 4 | 5 |
| 18 | Iceland (ISL) | 0 | 1 | 3 | 4 |
| 18 | Slovenia (SLO) | 0 | 1 | 3 | 4 |
| 20 | Austria (AUT) | 0 | 1 | 1 | 2 |
| 20 | Bulgaria (BUL) | 0 | 1 | 1 | 2 |
| 20 | Portugal (POR) | 0 | 1 | 1 | 2 |
| 23 | Lithuania (LTU) | 0 | 1 | 0 | 1 |
| 23 | Qatar (QAT) | 0 | 1 | 0 | 1 |
| 23 | Ukraine (UKR) | 0 | 1 | 0 | 1 |
| 26 | Faroe Islands (FRO) | 0 | 0 | 1 | 1 |
| 26 | Montenegro (MNE) | 0 | 0 | 1 | 1 |
| 26 | Tunisia (TUN) | 0 | 0 | 1 | 1 |
| Totals (28 entries) | | 121 | 121 | 121 | 363 |

== Title holders ==
=== International title holders ===
| Competition | Men's Champion | Women's Champion |
|---|---|---|
| World Cup | Denmark (2025) (4) | Norway (2025) (5) |
| Handball Olympic Tournament | Denmark (2024) (2) | Norway (2024) (3*) |
| Emerging Nations Championship | Great Britain (2025) (1) | — |
| Junior World Championship | Denmark (2025) (4) | Germany (2026) (2) |
| Youth World Championship | Germany (2025) (1) | Spain (2026) (2) |
| Cadet World Championship | Germany (2025) (1) | — |
| Handball Youth Olympic Tournament | Germany (2026) (1*) | Uruguay (2026) (1*) |
| Club World Cup | (Hungary) Veszprém (2026) (2) | (Angola) 1º de Agosto (2019) (1*) |
| Beach Handball World Championship | Germany (2026) (1) | Argentina (2026) (1) |
| Youth Beach Handball World Championship | Spain (2025) (2*) | Spain (2025) (2*) |

=== Continental title holders ===
| | Africa | Asia | Europe | Oceania | South and Central America | North America and Caribbean |
|---|---|---|---|---|---|---|
| Senior Men's | Egypt (2026) (10) | Bahrain (2026) (1) | Denmark (2026) (3) | Australia (2014) (8*) | Argentina (2026) (2*) | United States (2026) (2*) |
| Senior Women's | Angola (2024) (16*) | Japan (2024) (2) | Norway (2024) (10*) | Australia (2016) (7*) | Brazil (2024) (4*) | Cuba (2025) (3*) |
| Men's Continental Games | Egypt (2023) (8*) | Bahrain (2026) (1) | — | Australia (2006) (2*) | Argentina (2023) (3*) | |
| Women's Continental Games | Angola (2023) (8*) | South Korea (2026) (8*) | — | New Caledonia (2007) (1*) | Brazil (2023) (7*) | |
| Junior Men's | Egypt (2026) (15*) | South Korea (2026) (4) | Hungary (2026) (1) | New Caledonia (2024) (1) | Brazil (2026) (2*) | United States (2024) |
| Junior Women's | Egypt (2025) (1) | Japan (2025) (1) | Germany (2025) (1) | New Caledonia (2023) (2*) | Brazil (2026) (1) | Canada (2025) |
| Youth Boys | Egypt (2026) (9*) | Qatar (2026) (3*) | Germany (2026) (4*) | New Caledonia (2024) (1) | Argentina (2026) (2*) | United States (2024) |
| Youth Girls | Egypt (2025) (6*) | China (2025) (1) | Slovakia (2025) (1) | New Caledonia (2023) (3*) | Argentina (2025) (1) | Guadeloupe (2025) |
| Boys' Continental Youth Games | — | Saudi Arabia (2025) (1*) | Iceland (2025) (1) | — | — | — |
| Girls' Continental Youth Games | — | Iran (2025) (1*) | Germany (2025) (1) | — | — | — |
| Men's Club | (Egypt) Al Ahly (2026) (9) | (Kuwait) Burgan SC (2026) (1) | (Spain) Barcelona (2025–26) (13*) | (Australia) Sydney University (2026) (12*) | (Brazil) EC Pinheiros (2026) (2) | (United States) Los Angeles THC (2026) (1) |
| Women's Club | (Egypt) Al Ahly (2026) (3) | (Kazakhstan) Kaysar Club (2024) (3*) | (France) Metz Handball (2025–26) (1) | (Australia) University of Queensland (2026) (4*) | (Uruguay) SEDALO (2026) (1) | — |
| Men's Beach Handball | Tunisia (2026) | Oman (2025) (2) | Germany (2025) (1) | Australia (2026) (6*) | Brazil (2026) (4*) | United States (2026) |
| Women's Beach Handball | Benin (2026) | Vietnam (2025) (3*) | Spain (2025) (1) | Australia (2026) (7*) | Argentina (2026) (2*) | United States (2026) |
| Men's Youth Beach Handball | — | Iran (2024) (2*) | Spain (2026) | Australia (2017) (1*) | Argentina (2024) (1*) | — |
| Women's Youth Beach Handball | — | China (2024) (2*) | Hungary (2026) | American Samoa (2017) (1*) | Brazil (2024) (1*) | — |

- * = Record titles

== Member federations ==
Category A

- Algeria
- Argentina
- Austria
- Belarus
- Bahrain
- China
- Croatia
- (Czech Republic) Czechia
- Denmark
- Spain
- France
- Germany
- Hungary
- I. R. Iran
- Iceland
- Italy
- Japan
- South Korea
- Saudi Arabia
- Kuwait
- Montenegro
- Netherlands
- Norway
- Oman
- Poland
- Qatar
- Romania
- (Russia) Russian Federation
- Slovenia
- Serbia
- Switzerland
- Slovakia
- Sweden
- United Arab Emirates

Category B

- Angola
- Belgium
- Bosnia and Herzegovina
- Brazil
- Egypt
- Finland
- Greece
- Hong Kong, China
- Israel
- Jordan
- Kazakhstan
- Libya
- Luxembourg
- Morocco
- North Macedonia
- Portugal
- Singapore
- Tunisia
- Turkey
- Ukraine

Category C

- Afghanistan
- Albania
- American Samoa
- Andorra
- Antigua and Barbuda
- Armenia
- Australia
- Azerbaijan
- (The Bahamas) Bahamas
- Bangladesh
- Barbados
- Belize
- Benin
- Bhutan
- Bolivia
- Botswana
- British Virgin Islands
- Brunei
- Bulgaria
- Burkina Faso
- Burundi
- Cambodia
- Cameroon
- Canada
- Cayman Islands
- Cape Verde
- Central African Republic
- Chad
- Chile
- Colombia
- (Republic of the Congo) Congo
- (Democratic Republic of the Congo) DR Congo
- Cook Islands
- Comoros
- Costa Rica
- Cuba
- Cyprus
- Djibouti
- Dominica
- Dominican Republic
- Ecuador
- El Salvador
- Equatorial Guinea
- Estonia
- Ethiopia
- Faroe Islands
- Federated States of Micronesia
- Fiji
- Gabon
- (The Gambia) Gambia
- (Georgia (country)) Georgia
- (United Kingdom) Great Britain
- Guinea-Bissau
- Ghana
- Greenland
- Grenada
- Guatemala
- Guinea
- Guam
- Guyana
- Haiti
- Honduras
- India
- Indonesia
- Iraq
- (Republic of Ireland) Ireland
- Ivory Coast
- Jamaica
- Kenya
- Kiribati
- Kosovo
- Kyrgyzstan
- Laos
- Latvia
- Lebanon
- Lesotho
- Liberia
- Liechtenstein
- Lithuania
- Macau, China
- Madagascar
- Malawi
- Malaysia
- Maldives
- Marshall Islands
- Mali
- Malta
- Mauritania
- Mauritius
- Mexico
- Moldova
- Monaco
- Mongolia
- Mozambique
- Namibia
- Nauru
- Nepal
- New Zealand
- Nicaragua
- Niger
- Nigeria
- North Korea
- Pakistan
- Palestine
- Palau
- Panama
- Papua New Guinea
- Paraguay
- Peru
- Philippines
- Puerto Rico
- Rwanda
- Samoa
- São Tomé and Príncipe
- Senegal
- Seychelles
- Saint Kitts and Nevis
- Saint Lucia
- Sierra Leone
- Solomon Islands
- Somalia
- South Africa
- South Sudan
- Sri Lanka
- Sudan
- (Eswatini) Swaziland
- Syria
- Tanzania
- Tajikistan
- Chinese Taipei
- Thailand
- (Timor-Leste) Timor Leste
- Togo
- Tonga
- Trinidad and Tobago
- Turkmenistan
- Tuvalu
- Uganda
- Uruguay
- United States of America
- Uzbekistan
- Vanuatu
- Venezuela
- Vietnam
- Yemen
- Zambia
- Zimbabwe

=== Associated members ===
- England
- French Polynesia
- Northern Mariana Islands
- Scotland

=== Regional members ===
- French Guiana
- Guadeloupe
- Martinique
- New Caledonia

== IHF Awards ==
The IHF issues awards to organisations and individuals in recognition of their particular contribution to developing the sport of handball and the IHF.

These awards are:

- Hans Baumann Trophy (defunct after 2015, renamed as IHF President's Development Award)
- IHF Badge of Merit
- IHF Certificate of Merit
- IHF Cup of Honour and certificate
- IHF Hall of Fame
- IHF Honorary President and Honorary Members
- IHF Olympic Order
- IHF Plaque of Merit
- IHF President's Development Award
- IHF Referee's Badge of Honour
- IHF Referee's Diploma of Honour
- IHF Ring of Honour
- IHF World Coach of the Year
- IHF World Player of the Year

== IHF partners ==
| Type | Partner |
|---|---|
| Official sportswear | Hummel International |
| Host broadcaster | Sportfive |
| Official ball supplier | Molten Corporation |
| Official floor supplier | Gerflor |
