= 2025 IHF Men's U17 Handball World Championship =

Handball championship edition

Tournament details
- Host country: Morocco
- Venue: 1 (in 1 host city)
- Dates: 24 October – 1 November
- Teams: 12 (from 5 confederations)

Final positions
- Champions: Germany (1st title)
- Runners-up: Egypt
- Third place: Spain
- Fourth place: Qatar

Tournament statistics
- Matches played: 30
- Goals scored: 2,006 (66.87 per match)
- Attendance: 7,985 (266 per match)
- Top scorer: (United States) Jorge Gómez de Santiago (47 goals)

The 2025 IHF Men's U17 Handball World Championship was the first edition of the IHF Men's U17 Handball World Championship, held from 24 October to 1 November, 2025 in Casablanca, Morocco under the aegis of International Handball Federation (IHF).

Germany won the tournament, after defeating Egypt in the final.

== Qualification ==
Event	Dates	Host	Vacancies	Qualified
Host nation			1	Morocco
Europe			2	Germany; Spain
2025 Asian Under-17 Championship	15–25 September 2025	(Jordan) Amman	3	Iran; Qatar; South Korea
Africa			2	Egypt; Tunisia
South and Central American			2	Argentina; Brazil
North America and Caribbean			2	Puerto Rico; United States

== Draw ==
The draw took place on 2 October 2025 in the New Administrative Capital, Egypt.

=== Seeding ===
Pot 1	Pot 2	Pot 3	Pot 4
Germany; Spain; Egypt	Morocco; Tunisia; Argentina	Brazil; Iran; South Korea	Puerto Rico; United States; Qatar

== Referees ==
The referee pairs were selected on 19 September 2025.

Referees
Brazil	Lucas Dezembro; Guilherme Gonçalves
Egypt	Mohamed Esmail; Mohamed Saleh
Germany	Lucas Hellbusch; Darnel Jansen
Japan	Hideki Furukawa; Tetsuro Murata
Morocco	Zakaria El Malwane; Achraf El Mouniri
Nigeria	Abubakar Amodu; Sumaila Salihu

Referees
Romania	Georgiana Murariu; Mihaela Paraschiv
Saudi Arabia	Mohamed Al-Saqer; Ali Al-Suqufi
Slovenia	Žan Pukšič; Miha Satler
Tunisia	Roua Haggui; Sahar Haggui
United States	Anastasiia Bohoiavlenska; Cristina Molina

== Preliminary round ==
All times are local (UTC+1).

=== Group A ===
Pos	Team	Pld	W	D	L	GF	GA	GD	Pts	Qualification
1	Egypt	3	3	0	0	109	68	+41	6	Semifinals
2	Brazil	3	2	0	1	108	101	+7	4	
3	United States	3	1	0	2	72	100	−28	2	
4	Morocco (H)	3	0	0	3	79	99	−20	0	

Source: IHF
Rules for classification: 1) points; 2) head-to-head points; 3) head-to-head goal difference; 4) head-to-head number of goals scored; 5) goal difference.
(H) Hosts

24 October 2025; 18:50	Egypt	35–26	Brazil	Nouacer Hall, Casablanca; Attendance: 330; Referees: Hellbusch, Murata, Pukšič
24 October 2025; 18:50	Ramadan 10	(17–11)	Alves 7	Nouacer Hall, Casablanca; Attendance: 330; Referees: Hellbusch, Murata, Pukšič
24 October 2025; 18:50	2× (suspension) 1× (red card)	Report	3× (suspension) 1× (red card)	Nouacer Hall, Casablanca; Attendance: 330; Referees: Hellbusch, Murata, Pukšič

24 October 2025; 20:55	Morocco	21–22	United States	Nouacer Hall, Casablanca; Attendance: 550; Referees: Jansen, Salihu, Satler
24 October 2025; 20:55	Ragueb 7	(14–10)	Jagar-Woelker 6	Nouacer Hall, Casablanca; Attendance: 550; Referees: Jansen, Salihu, Satler
24 October 2025; 20:55	1× (yellow card) 4× (suspension)	Report	6× (suspension)	Nouacer Hall, Casablanca; Attendance: 550; Referees: Jansen, Salihu, Satler

26 October 2025; 18:50	United States	22–42	Egypt	Nouacer Hall, Casablanca; Attendance: 210; Referees: Murariu, Satler, Haggui
26 October 2025; 18:50	Gómez de Santiago 10	(12–21)	Ramadan 10	Nouacer Hall, Casablanca; Attendance: 210; Referees: Murariu, Satler, Haggui
26 October 2025; 18:50	4× (suspension)	Report	6× (suspension) 1× (red card)	Nouacer Hall, Casablanca; Attendance: 210; Referees: Murariu, Satler, Haggui

26 October 2025; 20:55	Morocco	38–45	Brazil	Nouacer Hall, Casablanca; Attendance: 550; Referees: Hellbusch, Furukawa, Paraschiv
26 October 2025; 20:55	El Hammoumi 11	(14–19)	E. Rodrigues	Nouacer Hall, Casablanca; Attendance: 550; Referees: Hellbusch, Furukawa, Paraschiv
26 October 2025; 20:55	5× (suspension)	Report	2× (suspension)	Nouacer Hall, Casablanca; Attendance: 550; Referees: Hellbusch, Furukawa, Paraschiv

28 October 2025; 18:50	Brazil	37–28	United States	Nouacer Hall, Casablanca; Attendance: 180; Referees: Al-Suqufi, Jansen, Haggui
28 October 2025; 18:50	R. Rodrigues 9	(19–13)	Gómez de Santiago 9	Nouacer Hall, Casablanca; Attendance: 180; Referees: Al-Suqufi, Jansen, Haggui
28 October 2025; 18:50	3× (suspension)	Report	2× (suspension)	Nouacer Hall, Casablanca; Attendance: 180; Referees: Al-Suqufi, Jansen, Haggui

28 October 2025; 20:55	Egypt	32–20	Morocco	Nouacer Hall, Casablanca; Attendance: 550; Referees: Amodu, Haggui, Molina
28 October 2025; 20:55	Bakir 7	(18–13)	Ben Aabel 5	Nouacer Hall, Casablanca; Attendance: 550; Referees: Amodu, Haggui, Molina
28 October 2025; 20:55		Report	3× (suspension)	Nouacer Hall, Casablanca; Attendance: 550; Referees: Amodu, Haggui, Molina

=== Group B ===
Pos	Team	Pld	W	D	L	GF	GA	GD	Pts	Qualification
1	Spain	3	3	0	0	146	63	+83	6	Semifinals
2	Qatar	3	2	0	1	107	95	+12	4	Semifinals
3	Tunisia	3	1	0	2	86	113	−27	2	
4	South Korea	3	0	0	3	67	135	−68	0	

Source: IHF
Rules for classification: 1) points; 2) head-to-head points; 3) head-to-head goal difference; 4) head-to-head number of goals scored; 5) goal difference.

24 October 2025; 10:30	Spain	57–16	South Korea	Nouacer Hall, Casablanca; Attendance: 250; Referees: Gonçalves, Al-Saqer, El Mouniri
24 October 2025; 10:30	Viladiú 10	(23–9)	Kim Dong-h. 5	Nouacer Hall, Casablanca; Attendance: 250; Referees: Gonçalves, Al-Saqer, El Mouniri
24 October 2025; 10:30	3× (suspension)	Report	4× (suspension)	Nouacer Hall, Casablanca; Attendance: 250; Referees: Gonçalves, Al-Saqer, El Mouniri

24 October 2025; 12:35	Tunisia	30–38	Qatar	Nouacer Hall, Casablanca; Attendance: 265; Referees: Esmail, Furukawa, Amodu
24 October 2025; 12:35	Gaabout 5	(12–18)	Hussein, Mahrous 10	Nouacer Hall, Casablanca; Attendance: 265; Referees: Esmail, Furukawa, Amodu
24 October 2025; 12:35	1× (yellow card) 6× (suspension)	Report	4× (suspension) 1× (red card)	Nouacer Hall, Casablanca; Attendance: 265; Referees: Esmail, Furukawa, Amodu

26 October 2025; 10:30	Qatar	24–41	Spain	Nouacer Hall, Casablanca; Attendance: 120; Referees: Jansen, El Malwane, Bohoiavlenska
26 October 2025; 10:30	Mahrous 8	(8–18)	four players 5	Nouacer Hall, Casablanca; Attendance: 120; Referees: Jansen, El Malwane, Bohoiavlenska
26 October 2025; 10:30	4× (suspension)	Report	3× (suspension)	Nouacer Hall, Casablanca; Attendance: 120; Referees: Jansen, El Malwane, Bohoiavlenska

26 October 2025; 12:35	Tunisia	33–27	South Korea	Nouacer Hall, Casablanca; Attendance: 130; Referees: Dezembro, Al-Saqer, Molina
26 October 2025; 12:35	Ben Salem 7	(20–11)	Kim Dong-h. 6	Nouacer Hall, Casablanca; Attendance: 130; Referees: Dezembro, Al-Saqer, Molina
26 October 2025; 12:35	7× (suspension)	Report	2× (suspension)	Nouacer Hall, Casablanca; Attendance: 130; Referees: Dezembro, Al-Saqer, Molina

28 October 2025; 10:30	South Korea	24–45	Qatar	Nouacer Hall, Casablanca; Attendance: 110; Referees: Furukawa, Salihu, Paraschiv
28 October 2025; 10:30	Kim Dong-h., Shin 5	(9–22)	El-Sayed 15	Nouacer Hall, Casablanca; Attendance: 110; Referees: Furukawa, Salihu, Paraschiv
28 October 2025; 10:30	4× (suspension)	Report	1× (yellow card) 3× (suspension) 1× (red card)	Nouacer Hall, Casablanca; Attendance: 110; Referees: Furukawa, Salihu, Paraschiv

28 October 2025; 12:35	Spain	48–23	Tunisia	Nouacer Hall, Casablanca; Attendance: 150; Referees: Hellbusch, Murata, Pukšič
28 October 2025; 12:35	Viladiú 8	(20–10)	Mechergui 6	Nouacer Hall, Casablanca; Attendance: 150; Referees: Hellbusch, Murata, Pukšič
28 October 2025; 12:35	3× (suspension)	Report	6× (suspension)	Nouacer Hall, Casablanca; Attendance: 150; Referees: Hellbusch, Murata, Pukšič

=== Group C ===
Pos	Team	Pld	W	D	L	GF	GA	GD	Pts	Qualification
1	Germany	3	3	0	0	143	57	+86	6	Semifinals
2	Argentina	3	2	0	1	103	98	+5	4	
3	Iran	3	1	0	2	87	116	−29	2	
4	Puerto Rico	3	0	0	3	73	135	−62	0	

Source: IHF
Rules for classification: 1) points; 2) head-to-head points; 3) head-to-head goal difference; 4) head-to-head number of goals scored; 5) goal difference.

24 October 2025; 14:40	Germany	45–20	Iran	Nouacer Hall, Casablanca; Attendance: 220; Referees: Paraschiv, Haggui, Bohoiavlenska
24 October 2025; 14:40	Eisend, Gaugisch 6	(19–10)	Hadizadeh 5	Nouacer Hall, Casablanca; Attendance: 220; Referees: Paraschiv, Haggui, Bohoiavlenska
24 October 2025; 14:40	3× (suspension)	Report	2× (suspension)	Nouacer Hall, Casablanca; Attendance: 220; Referees: Paraschiv, Haggui, Bohoiavlenska

24 October 2025; 16:45	Argentina	43–25	Puerto Rico	Nouacer Hall, Casablanca; Attendance: 190; Referees: Dezembro, Al-Suqufi, El Malwane
24 October 2025; 16:45	Refojos 7	(15–13)	Andreu, López 5	Nouacer Hall, Casablanca; Attendance: 190; Referees: Dezembro, Al-Suqufi, El Malwane
24 October 2025; 16:45		Report	3× (suspension)	Nouacer Hall, Casablanca; Attendance: 190; Referees: Dezembro, Al-Suqufi, El Malwane

26 October 2025; 14:40	Puerto Rico	15–54	Germany	Nouacer Hall, Casablanca; Attendance: 150; Referees: Saleh, Salihu, Haggui
26 October 2025; 14:40	López 6	(7–26)	Akkoc 7	Nouacer Hall, Casablanca; Attendance: 150; Referees: Saleh, Salihu, Haggui
26 October 2025; 14:40	2× (suspension)	Report		Nouacer Hall, Casablanca; Attendance: 150; Referees: Saleh, Salihu, Haggui

26 October 2025; 16:45	Argentina	38–29	Iran	Nouacer Hall, Casablanca; Attendance: 180; Referees: Esmail, El Mouniri, Pukšič
26 October 2025; 16:45	La Delfa, Roa 8	(20–16)	Norouzpourmameghani 6	Nouacer Hall, Casablanca; Attendance: 180; Referees: Esmail, El Mouniri, Pukšič
26 October 2025; 16:45	5× (suspension)	Report	4× (suspension)	Nouacer Hall, Casablanca; Attendance: 180; Referees: Esmail, El Mouniri, Pukšič

28 October 2025; 14:40	Iran	38–33	Puerto Rico	Nouacer Hall, Casablanca; Attendance: 120; Referees: Gonçalves, El Malwane, Murariu
28 October 2025; 14:40	Hematigharacheh, Hagh 8	(19–18)	García 11	Nouacer Hall, Casablanca; Attendance: 120; Referees: Gonçalves, El Malwane, Murariu
28 October 2025; 14:40	3× (suspension)	Report	2× (suspension)	Nouacer Hall, Casablanca; Attendance: 120; Referees: Gonçalves, El Malwane, Murariu

28 October 2025; 16:45	Germany	44–22	Argentina	Nouacer Hall, Casablanca; Attendance: 210; Referees: Dezembro, Saleh, Satler
28 October 2025; 16:45	Nowak 17	(21–11)	Refojos 6	Nouacer Hall, Casablanca; Attendance: 210; Referees: Dezembro, Saleh, Satler
28 October 2025; 16:45	1× (yellow card) 7× (suspension)	Report	4× (suspension)	Nouacer Hall, Casablanca; Attendance: 210; Referees: Dezembro, Saleh, Satler

=== Rankings ===
==== First-placed teams ranking ====
Pos	Grp	Team	Pld	W	D	L	GF	GA	GD	Pts	Qualification
1	C	Germany	3	3	0	0	143	57	+86	6	Semifinals
2	B	Spain	3	3	0	0	146	63	+83	6	Semifinals
3	A	Egypt	3	3	0	0	109	68	+41	6	Semifinals

Source: IHF
Rules for classification: 1) points; 2) goal difference; 3) number of goals scored for.

==== Second-placed teams ranking ====
Pos	Grp	Team	Pld	W	D	L	GF	GA	GD	Pts	Qualification
1	B	Qatar	3	2	0	1	107	95	+12	4	Semifinals
2	A	Brazil	3	2	0	1	108	101	+7	4	5–8th place semifinals
3	C	Argentina	3	2	0	1	103	98	+5	4	5–8th place semifinals

Source: IHF
Rules for classification: 1) points; 2) goal difference; 3) number of goals scored for.

==== Third-placed teams ranking ====
Pos	Grp	Team	Pld	W	D	L	GF	GA	GD	Pts	Qualification
1	B	Tunisia	3	1	0	2	86	113	−27	2	5–8th place semifinals
2	A	United States	3	1	0	2	72	100	−28	2	5–8th place semifinals
3	C	Iran	3	1	0	2	87	116	−29	2	9–12th place semifinals

Source: IHF
Rules for classification: 1) points; 2) goal difference; 3) number of goals scored for.

==== Fourth-placed teams ranking ====
Pos	Grp	Team	Pld	W	D	L	GF	GA	GD	Pts	Qualification
1	A	Morocco (H)	3	0	0	3	79	99	−20	0	9–12th place semifinals
2	C	Puerto Rico	3	0	0	3	73	135	−62	0	9–12th place semifinals
3	B	South Korea	3	0	0	3	67	135	−68	0	9–12th place semifinals

Source: IHF
Rules for classification: 1) points; 2) goal difference; 3) number of goals scored for.
(H) Hosts

== Knockout stage ==
=== Bracket ===
Championship bracket

Semi-finals
30 October
Germany	39
Qatar	22
30 October
Spain	28
Egypt	31

Final
1 November
Germany (ET)	44
Egypt	43
Third place
1 November
Qatar	23
Spain	35

5–8th place bracket

5–8th place semifinals
30 October
Brazil	35
Tunisia	32
30 October
Argentina	39
United States	26

Fifth place
1 November
Brazil	27
Argentina	39
Seventh place
1 November
Tunisia	44
United States	41

9–12th place bracket

9–12th place semifinals
29 October
Iran	30
South Korea	21
29 October
Morocco	40
Puerto Rico	44

Ninth place
31 October
Iran	42
Puerto Rico	30
Eleventh place
31 October
South Korea	32 (3)
Morocco (Pen.)	32 (4)

=== 9–12th place semifinals ===
29 October 2025; 15:30	Iran	30–21	South Korea	Nouacer Hall, Casablanca; Attendance: 125; Referees: Murariu, Haggui, Bohoiavlenska
29 October 2025; 15:30	three players 4	(15–11)	Kim Dong-h. 6	Nouacer Hall, Casablanca; Attendance: 125; Referees: Murariu, Haggui, Bohoiavlenska
29 October 2025; 15:30	4× (suspension)	Report	5× (suspension)	Nouacer Hall, Casablanca; Attendance: 125; Referees: Murariu, Haggui, Bohoiavlenska

29 October 2025; 17:45	Morocco	40–44	Puerto Rico	Nouacer Hall, Casablanca; Attendance: 260; Referees: Esmail, Murata, Al-Saqer
29 October 2025; 17:45	Ben Aabel 8	(16–20)	Andreu 11	Nouacer Hall, Casablanca; Attendance: 260; Referees: Esmail, Murata, Al-Saqer
29 October 2025; 17:45	1× (yellow card) 10× (suspension) 1× (red card)	Report	6× (suspension)	Nouacer Hall, Casablanca; Attendance: 260; Referees: Esmail, Murata, Al-Saqer

=== 5–8th place semifinals ===
30 October 2025; 13:00	Argentina	39–26	United States	Nouacer Hall, Casablanca; Attendance: 110; Referees: Amodu, El Malwane, Paraschiv
30 October 2025; 13:00	La Delfa 7	(16–12)	Gómez de Santiago 11	Nouacer Hall, Casablanca; Attendance: 110; Referees: Amodu, El Malwane, Paraschiv
30 October 2025; 13:00	1× (yellow card) 3× (suspension)	Report	1× (yellow card) 2× (suspension)	Nouacer Hall, Casablanca; Attendance: 110; Referees: Amodu, El Malwane, Paraschiv

30 October 2025; 15:15	Brazil	35–32	Tunisia	Nouacer Hall, Casablanca; Attendance: 240; Referees: Furukawa, El Mouniri, Molina
30 October 2025; 15:15	Lima 6	(20–19)	Chattali 6	Nouacer Hall, Casablanca; Attendance: 240; Referees: Furukawa, El Mouniri, Molina
30 October 2025; 15:15	3× (suspension)	Report	1× (yellow card) 2× (suspension)	Nouacer Hall, Casablanca; Attendance: 240; Referees: Furukawa, El Mouniri, Molina

=== Semifinals ===
30 October 2025; 17:45	Germany	39–22	Qatar	Nouacer Hall, Casablanca; Attendance: 360; Referees: Dezembro, Saleh, Murata
30 October 2025; 17:45	Löhr 9	(21–14)	Mahrous 11	Nouacer Hall, Casablanca; Attendance: 360; Referees: Dezembro, Saleh, Murata
30 October 2025; 17:45	1× (suspension)	Report	1× (yellow card) 3× (suspension)	Nouacer Hall, Casablanca; Attendance: 360; Referees: Dezembro, Saleh, Murata

30 October 2025; 20:15	Spain	28–31	Egypt	Nouacer Hall, Casablanca; Attendance: 560; Referees: Hellbusch, Al-Suqufi, Satler
30 October 2025; 20:15	Sánchez 7	(12–12)	Bakir 7	Nouacer Hall, Casablanca; Attendance: 560; Referees: Hellbusch, Al-Suqufi, Satler
30 October 2025; 20:15	1× (yellow card) 4× (suspension)	Report	5× (suspension)	Nouacer Hall, Casablanca; Attendance: 560; Referees: Hellbusch, Al-Suqufi, Satler

=== Eleventh place game ===
31 October 2025
15:30
South Korea
35–36
Morocco
Nouacer Hall, Casablanca
Attendance: 220
Referees: Jansen, Furukawa, Pukšič
Kang Ji-u., Kim Dong-h. 9
(14–12)
Ragueb 12
3× (suspension)
Report
8× (suspension)

FT: 32–32 Pen: 3–4

=== Ninth place game ===
31 October 2025; 17:45	Iran	42–30	Puerto Rico	Nouacer Hall, Casablanca; Attendance: 85; Referees: Gonçalves, Gonçalves, Haggui
31 October 2025; 17:45	Norouzpour, Samarbakhsh 9	(19–15)	Andreu 7	Nouacer Hall, Casablanca; Attendance: 85; Referees: Gonçalves, Gonçalves, Haggui
31 October 2025; 17:45	2× (suspension)	Report	2× (suspension)	Nouacer Hall, Casablanca; Attendance: 85; Referees: Gonçalves, Gonçalves, Haggui

=== Seventh place game ===
1 November 2025; 13:00	Tunisia	44–41	United States	Nouacer Hall, Casablanca; Attendance: 80; Referees: Dezembro, El Malwane, Paraschiv
1 November 2025; 13:00	Garrache 12	(21–23)	Gómez de Santiago 12	Nouacer Hall, Casablanca; Attendance: 80; Referees: Dezembro, El Malwane, Paraschiv
1 November 2025; 13:00	1× (yellow card) 2× (suspension)	Report	4× (suspension)	Nouacer Hall, Casablanca; Attendance: 80; Referees: Dezembro, El Malwane, Paraschiv

=== Fifth place game ===
1 November 2025; 15:15	Brazil	27–39	Argentina	Nouacer Hall, Casablanca; Attendance: 145; Referees: Hellbusch, Haggui, Molina
1 November 2025; 15:15	E. Rodrigues 8	(12–20)	La Delfa 10	Nouacer Hall, Casablanca; Attendance: 145; Referees: Hellbusch, Haggui, Molina
1 November 2025; 15:15	2× (suspension) 2× (red card)	Report	2× (suspension)	Nouacer Hall, Casablanca; Attendance: 145; Referees: Hellbusch, Haggui, Molina

=== Third place game ===
1 November 2025; 17:45	Qatar	23–35	Spain	Nouacer Hall, Casablanca; Attendance: 365; Referees: Esmail, Jansen, Murariu
1 November 2025; 17:45	Mahrous 9	(10–18)	Anselmo, Martínez 6	Nouacer Hall, Casablanca; Attendance: 365; Referees: Esmail, Jansen, Murariu
1 November 2025; 17:45	4× (suspension)	Report	3× (suspension)	Nouacer Hall, Casablanca; Attendance: 365; Referees: Esmail, Jansen, Murariu

=== Final ===
1 November 2025
20:15
Germany
44–43 (ET)
Egypt
Nouacer Hall, Casablanca
Attendance: 1,000
Referees: Gonçalves, Murata, Pukšič
Nowak 15
(18–17)
Ahmed 13
3× (suspension)
Report
4× (suspension)

FT: 37–37 ET: 7–6

== Final ranking ==
Rank	Team
1st place, gold medalist(s)	Germany
2nd place, silver medalist(s)	Egypt
3rd place, bronze medalist(s)	Spain
4	Qatar
5	Argentina
6	Brazil
7	Tunisia
8	United States
9	Iran
10	Puerto Rico
11	Morocco
12	South Korea

== Statistics ==
=== Top goalscorers ===
Rank	Name	Goals	Shots	%
1	(United States) Jorge Gómez de Santiago	47	74	64
2	(Qatar) Ramy Mahrous	46	63	73
3	(Germany) Leo Nowak	44	55	80
4	(Qatar) Ahmed El-Sayed	40	73	55
5	(Egypt) Yassien Ramadan	35	43	81
6	(Egypt) Youssef Ahmed	34	52	65
6	(Morocco) El Hassan Ragueb	34	43	79
8	(Argentina) Nicolás La Delfa	33	53	62
9	(South Korea) Kim Dong-ha	31	58	53
10	(Puerto Rico) Dylan Andreu	29	55	53

Source: IHF

=== Top goalkeepers ===
Rank	Name	%	Saves	Shots
1	(Iran) Hossein Khojasteh	39	32	83
2	(Spain) Rubén Cardenosa	36	28	77
2	(Spain) Albert Quesada	36	38	106
4	(Germany) Kim Hüter	35	24	68
5	(Argentina) Francisco Pérez	33	45	136
6	(Germany) Tobias Dengler	32	37	115
7	(Argentina) Nehuen Mazzaferri	31	27	87
8	(Qatar) Omar El-Sayed	29	54	184
8	(Iran) Mehrshad Mansouri	29	47	163
8	(Egypt) Mohamed Othman	29	10	35

Source: IHF
