= 2025 Asian Men's U-17 Handball Championship =

Tournament details
- Host country: Jordan
- Venue: 1 (in 1 host city)
- Dates: 15–25 September
- Teams: 13 (from 1 confederation)

Final positions
- Champions: Iran (1st title)
- Runners-up: South Korea
- Third place: Qatar
- Fourth place: Bahrain

Tournament statistics
- Matches played: 43

Awards
- Best player: (South Korea) Kang Dong-ho

The 2025 Asian Men's U17 Handball Championship was the first edition of the championship held from 15 to 25 September 2025 in Amman, Jordan under the aegis of Asian Handball Federation. The championship was organised by the Jordan Handball Federation. It also acted as the qualification tournament for the 2025 IHF Men's U17 Handball World Championship

The championship was previously scheduled to be held from 1 to 11 July 2025, but was postponed due to the Twelve-Day War between Iran and Israel.

== Draw ==
The draw was held on 23 April 2025 at 18:00 at the headquarters of the Jordan Handball Federation in Amman, Jordan.

=== Seeding ===
Pot 1	Pot 2	Pot 3	Pot 4
Jordan (host); South Korea; Kuwait; Saudi Arabia	Bahrain; Iran; Qatar; Chinese Taipei	China; India	Uzbekistan; Hong Kong; Maldives

- Syria had not initially registered to participate in the championship. However, after the event was rescheduled, they registered. Consequently, on 6 August 2025, Syria was placed in Group C without conducting the entire draw again.
- On 8 September 2025, Uzbekistan withdrew from the championship. Hence, Syria was shifted to Group D in accordance with the AHF COC Regulations.

== Preliminary round ==
All times are local (UTC+3).

=== Group A ===
Pos	Team	Pld	W	D	L	GF	GA	GD	Pts	Qualification
1	Bahrain	2	2	0	0	85	54	+31	4	Main round
2	Kuwait	2	1	0	1	78	52	+26	2	Main round
3	Hong Kong	2	0	0	2	45	102	−57	0	Martyr Fahad Al-Ahmad Al-Sabah Cup

Source: AHF
Rules for classification: 1) Points; 2) Head-to-head points; 3) Head-to-head goal difference; 4) Head-to-head goals scored; 5) Goal difference; 6) Goals scored; 7) Draw.

15 September 2025; 15:00	Hong Kong	21–48	Kuwait	Princess Sumaya Hall, Amman
15 September 2025; 15:00		(7–19)		Princess Sumaya Hall, Amman
15 September 2025; 15:00		Report		Princess Sumaya Hall, Amman

16 September 2025; 11:00	Bahrain	54–24	Hong Kong	Princess Sumaya Hall, Amman
16 September 2025; 11:00		(21–11)		Princess Sumaya Hall, Amman
16 September 2025; 11:00		Report		Princess Sumaya Hall, Amman

17 September 2025; 13:00	Kuwait	30–31	Bahrain	Princess Sumaya Hall, Amman
17 September 2025; 13:00		(13–15)		Princess Sumaya Hall, Amman
17 September 2025; 13:00		Report		Princess Sumaya Hall, Amman

=== Group B ===
Pos	Team	Pld	W	D	L	GF	GA	GD	Pts	Qualification
1	Qatar	2	2	0	0	65	47	+18	4	Main round
2	Saudi Arabia	2	1	0	1	61	51	+10	2	Main round
3	China	2	0	0	2	48	76	−28	0	Martyr Fahad Al-Ahmad Al-Sabah Cup

Source: AHF
Rules for classification: 1) Points; 2) Head-to-head points; 3) Head-to-head goal difference; 4) Head-to-head goals scored; 5) Goal difference; 6) Goals scored; 7) Draw.

15 September 2025; 17:00	China	24–38	Saudi Arabia	Princess Sumaya Hall, Amman
15 September 2025; 17:00		(15–22)		Princess Sumaya Hall, Amman
15 September 2025; 17:00		Report		Princess Sumaya Hall, Amman

16 September 2025; 13:00	Qatar	38–24	China	Princess Sumaya Hall, Amman
16 September 2025; 13:00		(18–10)		Princess Sumaya Hall, Amman
16 September 2025; 13:00		Report		Princess Sumaya Hall, Amman

17 September 2025; 11:00	Saudi Arabia	23–27	Qatar	Princess Sumaya Hall, Amman
17 September 2025; 11:00		(14–13)		Princess Sumaya Hall, Amman
17 September 2025; 11:00		Report		Princess Sumaya Hall, Amman

=== Group C ===
Pos	Team	Pld	W	D	L	GF	GA	GD	Pts	Qualification
1	Chinese Taipei	2	2	0	0	97	61	+36	4	Main round
2	Jordan (H)	2	1	0	1	80	57	+23	2	Main round
3	India	2	0	0	2	45	104	−59	0	Martyr Fahad Al-Ahmad Al-Sabah Cup

Source: AHF
Rules for classification: 1) Points; 2) Head-to-head points; 3) Head-to-head goal difference; 4) Head-to-head goals scored; 5) Goal difference; 6) Goals scored; 7) Draw.
(H) Hosts

15 September 2025; 19:00	India	18–46	Jordan	Princess Sumaya Hall, Amman
15 September 2025; 19:00		(7–21)		Princess Sumaya Hall, Amman
15 September 2025; 19:00		Report		Princess Sumaya Hall, Amman

16 September 2025; 15:00	Chinese Taipei	58–27	India	Princess Sumaya Hall, Amman
16 September 2025; 15:00		(27–12)		Princess Sumaya Hall, Amman
16 September 2025; 15:00		Report		Princess Sumaya Hall, Amman

17 September 2025; 19:00	Jordan	34–39	Chinese Taipei	Princess Sumaya Hall, Amman
17 September 2025; 19:00		(17–17)		Princess Sumaya Hall, Amman
17 September 2025; 19:00		Report		Princess Sumaya Hall, Amman

=== Group D ===
Pos	Team	Pld	W	D	L	GF	GA	GD	Pts	Qualification
1	Iran	3	3	0	0	140	51	+89	6	Main round
2	South Korea	3	2	0	1	145	73	+72	4	Main round
3	Syria	3	1	0	2	113	95	+18	2	Martyr Fahad Al-Ahmad Al-Sabah Cup
4	Maldives	3	0	0	3	35	214	−179	0	Martyr Fahad Al-Ahmad Al-Sabah Cup

Source: AHF
Rules for classification: 1) Points; 2) Head-to-head points; 3) Head-to-head goal difference; 4) Head-to-head goals scored; 5) Goal difference; 6) Goals scored; 7) Draw.

15 September 2025; 11:00	Maldives	4–65	Iran	Princess Sumaya Hall, Amman
15 September 2025; 11:00		(3–33)		Princess Sumaya Hall, Amman
15 September 2025; 11:00		Report		Princess Sumaya Hall, Amman

15 September 2025; 13:00	Syria	26–36	South Korea	Princess Sumaya Hall, Amman
15 September 2025; 13:00		(11–17)		Princess Sumaya Hall, Amman
15 September 2025; 13:00		Report		Princess Sumaya Hall, Amman

16 September 2025; 17:00	Syria	22–44	Iran	Princess Sumaya Hall, Amman
16 September 2025; 17:00		(11–25)		Princess Sumaya Hall, Amman
16 September 2025; 17:00		Report		Princess Sumaya Hall, Amman

16 September 2025; 19:00	Maldives	16–84	South Korea	Princess Sumaya Hall, Amman
16 September 2025; 19:00		(6–42)		Princess Sumaya Hall, Amman
16 September 2025; 19:00		Report		Princess Sumaya Hall, Amman

17 September 2025; 15:00	Maldives	15–65	Syria	Princess Sumaya Hall, Amman
17 September 2025; 15:00		(8–30)		Princess Sumaya Hall, Amman
17 September 2025; 15:00		Report		Princess Sumaya Hall, Amman

17 September 2025; 17:00	South Korea	25–31	Iran	Princess Sumaya Hall, Amman
17 September 2025; 17:00		(13–14)		Princess Sumaya Hall, Amman
17 September 2025; 17:00		Report		Princess Sumaya Hall, Amman

== Martyr Fahad Al-Ahmad Al-Sabah Cup ==
=== Group III ===
Pos	Team	Pld	W	D	L	GF	GA	GD	Pts
9	China	4	4	0	0	180	82	+98	8
10	Syria	4	3	0	1	166	106	+60	6
11	Hong Kong	4	2	0	2	161	152	+9	4
12	India	4	1	0	3	133	175	−42	2
13	Maldives	4	0	0	4	79	204	−125	0

Source: AHF
Rules for classification: 1) Points; 2) Head-to-head points; 3) Head-to-head goal difference; 4) Head-to-head goals scored; 5) Goal difference; 6) Goals scored; 7) Draw.

19 September 2025; 11:00	Syria	30–34	China	Princess Sumaya Hall, Amman
19 September 2025; 11:00		(15–16)		Princess Sumaya Hall, Amman
19 September 2025; 11:00		Report		Princess Sumaya Hall, Amman

19 September 2025; 13:00	Maldives	21–52	Hong Kong	Princess Sumaya Hall, Amman
19 September 2025; 13:00		(12–25)		Princess Sumaya Hall, Amman
19 September 2025; 13:00		Report		Princess Sumaya Hall, Amman

20 September 2025; 11:00	India	12–44	China	Princess Sumaya Hall, Amman
20 September 2025; 11:00		(6–24)		Princess Sumaya Hall, Amman
20 September 2025; 11:00		Report		Princess Sumaya Hall, Amman

20 September 2025; 13:00	Syria	36–31	Hong Kong	Princess Sumaya Hall, Amman
20 September 2025; 13:00		(17–14)		Princess Sumaya Hall, Amman
20 September 2025; 13:00		Report		Princess Sumaya Hall, Amman

21 September 2025; 11:00	India	25–51	Syria	Princess Sumaya Hall, Amman
21 September 2025; 11:00		(13–25)		Princess Sumaya Hall, Amman
21 September 2025; 11:00		Report		Princess Sumaya Hall, Amman

21 September 2025; 13:00	China	51–16	Maldives	Princess Sumaya Hall, Amman
21 September 2025; 13:00		(27–9)		Princess Sumaya Hall, Amman
21 September 2025; 13:00		Report		Princess Sumaya Hall, Amman

23 September 2025; 11:00	Maldives	16–49	Syria	Princess Sumaya Hall, Amman
23 September 2025; 11:00		(8–26)		Princess Sumaya Hall, Amman
23 September 2025; 11:00		Report		Princess Sumaya Hall, Amman

23 September 2025; 13:00	India	44–54	Hong Kong	Princess Sumaya Hall, Amman
23 September 2025; 13:00		(20–26)		Princess Sumaya Hall, Amman
23 September 2025; 13:00		Report		Princess Sumaya Hall, Amman

24 September 2025; 17:00	Maldives	26–52	India	Princess Sumaya Hall, Amman
24 September 2025; 17:00		(14–23)		Princess Sumaya Hall, Amman
24 September 2025; 17:00		Report		Princess Sumaya Hall, Amman

24 September 2025; 19:00	Hong Kong	24–51	China	Princess Sumaya Hall, Amman
24 September 2025; 19:00		(12–25)		Princess Sumaya Hall, Amman
24 September 2025; 19:00		Report		Princess Sumaya Hall, Amman

== Main round ==
=== Group I ===
Pos	Team	Pld	W	D	L	GF	GA	GD	Pts	Qualification
1	South Korea	3	2	1	0	107	87	+20	5	Semifinals
2	Bahrain	3	2	0	1	103	96	+7	4	Semifinals
3	Saudi Arabia	3	1	1	1	101	92	+9	3	Fifth place game
4	Chinese Taipei	3	0	0	3	94	130	−36	0	Seventh place game

Source: AHF
Rules for classification: 1) Points; 2) Head-to-head points; 3) Head-to-head goal difference; 4) Head-to-head goals scored; 5) Goal difference; 6) Goals scored; 7) Draw.

19 September 2025; 17:00	South Korea	30–26	Bahrain	Princess Sumaya Hall, Amman
19 September 2025; 17:00		(16–11)		Princess Sumaya Hall, Amman
19 September 2025; 17:00		Report		Princess Sumaya Hall, Amman

19 September 2025; 21:00	Chinese Taipei	29–39	Saudi Arabia	Princess Sumaya Hall, Amman
19 September 2025; 21:00		(11–17)		Princess Sumaya Hall, Amman
19 September 2025; 21:00		Report		Princess Sumaya Hall, Amman

20 September 2025; 17:00	South Korea	48–32	Chinese Taipei	Princess Sumaya Hall, Amman
20 September 2025; 17:00		(24–17)		Princess Sumaya Hall, Amman
20 September 2025; 17:00		Report		Princess Sumaya Hall, Amman

20 September 2025; 21:00	Bahrain	34–33	Saudi Arabia	Princess Sumaya Hall, Amman
20 September 2025; 21:00		(16–18)		Princess Sumaya Hall, Amman
20 September 2025; 21:00		Report		Princess Sumaya Hall, Amman

21 September 2025; 15:00	Saudi Arabia	29–29	South Korea	Princess Sumaya Hall, Amman
21 September 2025; 15:00		(15–15)		Princess Sumaya Hall, Amman
21 September 2025; 15:00		Report		Princess Sumaya Hall, Amman

21 September 2025; 21:00	Bahrain	43–33	Chinese Taipei	Princess Sumaya Hall, Amman
21 September 2025; 21:00		(21–14)		Princess Sumaya Hall, Amman
21 September 2025; 21:00		Report		Princess Sumaya Hall, Amman

=== Group II ===
Pos	Team	Pld	W	D	L	GF	GA	GD	Pts	Qualification
1	Iran	3	3	0	0	123	77	+46	6	Semifinals
2	Qatar	3	2	0	1	83	93	−10	4	Semifinals
3	Kuwait	3	1	0	2	92	95	−3	2	Fifth place game
4	Jordan (H)	3	0	0	3	81	114	−33	0	Seventh place game

Source: AHF
Rules for classification: 1) Points; 2) Head-to-head points; 3) Head-to-head goal difference; 4) Head-to-head goals scored; 5) Goal difference; 6) Goals scored; 7) Draw.
(H) Hosts

19 September 2025; 15:00	Iran	35–30	Kuwait	Princess Sumaya Hall, Amman
19 September 2025; 15:00		(20–17)		Princess Sumaya Hall, Amman
19 September 2025; 15:00		Report		Princess Sumaya Hall, Amman

19 September 2025; 19:00	Jordan	25–32	Qatar	Princess Sumaya Hall, Amman
19 September 2025; 19:00		(9–20)		Princess Sumaya Hall, Amman
19 September 2025; 19:00		Report		Princess Sumaya Hall, Amman

20 September 2025; 15:00	Iran	42–22	Jordan	Princess Sumaya Hall, Amman
20 September 2025; 15:00		(18–13)		Princess Sumaya Hall, Amman
20 September 2025; 15:00		Report		Princess Sumaya Hall, Amman

20 September 2025; 19:00	Kuwait	22–26	Qatar	Princess Sumaya Hall, Amman
20 September 2025; 19:00		(10–11)		Princess Sumaya Hall, Amman
20 September 2025; 19:00		Report		Princess Sumaya Hall, Amman

21 September 2025; 17:00	Kuwait	40–34	Jordan	Princess Sumaya Hall, Amman
21 September 2025; 17:00		(25–17)		Princess Sumaya Hall, Amman
21 September 2025; 17:00		Report		Princess Sumaya Hall, Amman

21 September 2025; 19:00	Qatar	25–46	Iran	Princess Sumaya Hall, Amman
21 September 2025; 19:00		(9–18)		Princess Sumaya Hall, Amman
21 September 2025; 19:00		Report		Princess Sumaya Hall, Amman

== Knockout stage ==
=== Bracket ===
Semifinals
23 September
South Korea (ET)	36
Qatar	35
23 September
Iran	37
Bahrain	19

Final
25 September
South Korea	25
Iran	28
Third place
25 September
Qatar	33
Bahrain	26

=== Seventh place game ===
23 September 2025; 15:00	Chinese Taipei	29–28	Jordan	Princess Sumaya Hall, Amman
23 September 2025; 15:00		(16–16)		Princess Sumaya Hall, Amman
23 September 2025; 15:00		Report		Princess Sumaya Hall, Amman

=== Fifth place game ===
23 September 2025; 17:00	Saudi Arabia	34–29	Kuwait	Princess Sumaya Hall, Amman
23 September 2025; 17:00		(14–12)		Princess Sumaya Hall, Amman
23 September 2025; 17:00		Report		Princess Sumaya Hall, Amman

=== Semifinals ===
23 September 2025
19:00
South Korea
36–35 (ET)
Qatar
Princess Sumaya Hall, Amman
Referees: Mohsen, Al-Qabandi (KUW)
Kang 12
(15–14)
Mahrous, Saber 11
3× (suspension)
Report
1× (yellow card) 5× (suspension)

FT: 31–31 ET: 5–4

23 September 2025; 21:00	Iran	37–19	Bahrain	Princess Sumaya Hall, Amman; Referees: Ren, Shi (CHN)
23 September 2025; 21:00		(17–7)		Princess Sumaya Hall, Amman; Referees: Ren, Shi (CHN)
23 September 2025; 21:00	1× (suspension)	Report	2× (suspension)	Princess Sumaya Hall, Amman; Referees: Ren, Shi (CHN)

=== Third place game ===
25 September 2025; 16:00	Qatar	33–26	Bahrain	Princess Sumaya Hall, Amman; Referees: Imonboev, Akhmedov (UZB)
25 September 2025; 16:00	Mahrous, Saber 9	(19–16)	SM Al-Muhafda 7	Princess Sumaya Hall, Amman; Referees: Imonboev, Akhmedov (UZB)
25 September 2025; 16:00	1× (yellow card) 2× (suspension) 1× (red card)	Report	1× (suspension) 1× (red card)	Princess Sumaya Hall, Amman; Referees: Imonboev, Akhmedov (UZB)

=== Final ===
25 September 2025; 18:00	South Korea	25–28	Iran	Princess Sumaya Hall, Amman; Referees: Al-Shahi, Al-Wahibi (OMA)
25 September 2025; 18:00	Kang 9	(11–13)	Javidi, Nik Eghbal 6	Princess Sumaya Hall, Amman; Referees: Al-Shahi, Al-Wahibi (OMA)
25 September 2025; 18:00	1× (yellow card) 4× (suspension)	Report	1× (suspension)	Princess Sumaya Hall, Amman; Referees: Al-Shahi, Al-Wahibi (OMA)

== Final standings ==
Rank	Team
1st place, gold medalist(s)	Iran
2nd place, silver medalist(s)	South Korea
3rd place, bronze medalist(s)	Qatar
4	Bahrain
5	Saudi Arabia
6	Kuwait
7	Chinese Taipei
8	Jordan
9	China
10	Syria
11	Hong Kong
12	India
13	Maldives

Team qualified for the 2025 U17 World Championship

== All-Star Team ==
Position	Player
Goalkeeper	(Qatar) Omar El-Sayed
Right wing	(Bahrain) Mahmood Ali
Right back	(Qatar) Moaaz Saber
Centre back	(Iran) Mahdi Ahmadi
Left back	(South Korea) Seong Ji-seong
Left wing	(Iran) Mohammad Keshavarz
Pivot	(Iran) Amirhossein Nik Eghbal
MVP	(South Korea) Kang Dong-ho
