= IHF Men's U17 Handball World Championship =

Men's U17 handball tournament

- Upcoming season or competition: 2025 IHF Men's U17 Handball World Championship
- Sport: Handball
- Founded: 2025
- Founder: International Handball Federation
- First season: 2025
- No. of teams: 12
- Continents: 5
- Most recent champion: Germany (1st title)
- Most titles: Germany (1 title)

The IHF Men's U17 Handball World Championship will be the official competition for men's national handball teams under age 17. It will be organized by the International Handball Federation (IHF) starting in 2025.

== Tournaments ==
Year	Host	Gold medal game			Bronze medal game		
Year	Host	Gold	Score	Silver	Bronze	Score	Fourth place
2025; Details	(Morocco); Casablanca	Germany	44–43 (ET)	Egypt	Spain	35–23	Qatar

== Medal table ==
Rank	Nation	Gold	Silver	Bronze	Total
1	Germany	1	0	0	1
2	Egypt	0	1	0	1
3	Spain	0	0	1	1
Totals (3 entries)		1	1	1	3

== Participating nations ==
Nation	(Morocco) 2025	Years
Argentina	5th	1
Brazil	6th	1
Egypt	2nd	1
Germany	1st	1
Iran	9th	1
Morocco	11th	1
Puerto Rico	10th	1
Qatar	4th	1
South Korea	12th	1
Spain	3rd	1
Tunisia	7th	1
United States	8th	1
Total	12	
