= IHF Referee's Diploma of Honour =

Referees who participated in a World Championship (Men and/or Women) or in Olympic Handball Tournaments shall receive the Referee's Diploma of Honour upon termination of their international career.

The diploma is presented by the PRC president or his representative.
