= Hassan Moustafa =

Egyptian handball player

His Excellency Dr. Hassan Moustafa
- حسن مصطفى
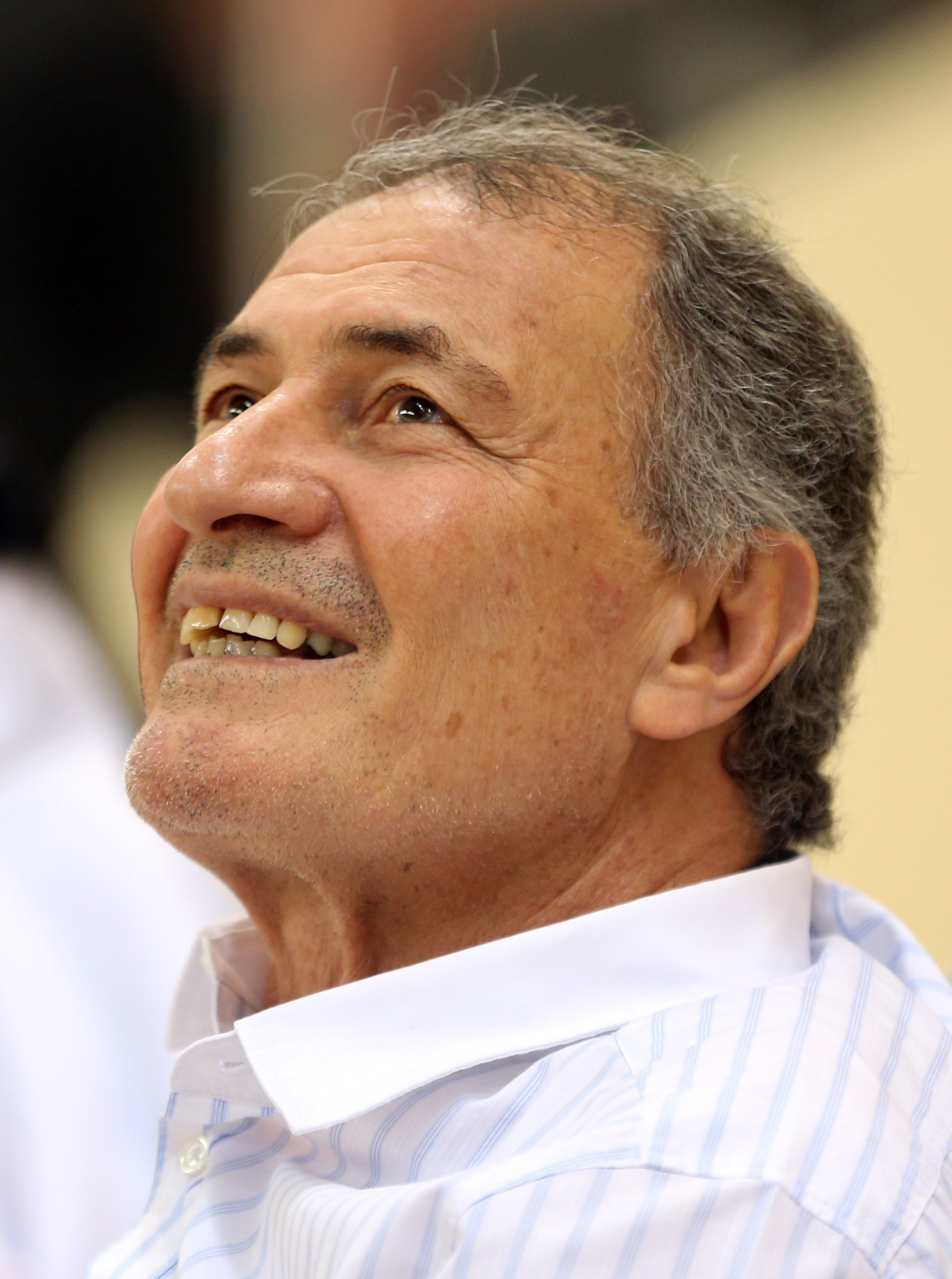

5th President of International Handball Federation
- Incumbent
- Assumed office 26 November 2000
- Honorary President: Erwin Lanc
- 1st Vice-president: Staffan Holmqvist (2000–2007) Miguel Roca Mas (2009–2017) Joël Delplanque (2017–)
- Preceded by: Erwin Lanc

Chairman of IHF Commission of Coaching and Methods
- In office 1992–2000
- President: Erwin Lanc
- Preceded by: Ioan Kunst-Ghermănescu
- Succeeded by: Naser Saleh Abu Marzouq

Personal details
- Born: 28 July 1944 (age 82) Cairo, Kingdom of Egypt (now Egypt)
- Education: Doctorate in sports administration
- Alma mater: German College of Physical Education and Sports, Leipzig
- Occupation: Sports administrator

Hassan Moustafa (born 28 July 1944) is an Egyptian sports administrator and former handball player. Moustafa is the fifth and current president of International Handball Federation, and a former president of Egyptian Handball Federation.

== Early life and education ==
Moustafa was born in Cairo in 1944. Moustafa studied in German College of Physical Education and Sports in Leipzig, Germany and completed a doctoral thesis on the topic: The administration elements of a successful mission of clubs and federation.

== Handball career ==
Moustafa devoted his life to handball. He played for the Al-Ahly Club for fifteen years and played for the Egyptian national team for ten years. After the end of his playing career, he was involved in coaching and elected as best coach in Egypt in 1998. He was also an international handball referee.

== Sports administration ==
Besides being elected as the President of International Handball Federation in the year 2000, Moustafa was the President of Egyptian Handball Federation from 1984 to 1992 and from 1996 to 2008. He was also elected as the Secretary General of Egyptian Olympic Committee. He was elected as the Chairman of IHF Commission of Coaching and Methods of International Handball Federation from 1992 to 2000.

Position	Term
President of Egyptian Handball Federation	1984–1992; 1996–2008
Secretary General of Egyptian Olympic Committee	1985–2000
First Vice-President of Arab Handball Federation	1992–2000
President of Mediterranean Handball Confederation	1999–2003
President of International Handball Federation	2000–present
Council Member of Association of Summer Olympic International Federations	2005–2014
Lifetime Honorary President of Egyptian Olympic Committee	2020–present

== IHF Presidency ==
Moustafa has been President of the International Handball Federation since 2000. During the 2009 World Men's Handball Championship a conflict emerged between Moustafa and the Secretary General of the IHF, Peter Mühlematter. Following table shows the results of election of the President of International Handball Federation.

Election of the President of International Handball Federation					
Year	Venue	Candidate 1	Candidate 2	Candidate 3	Candidate 4
2000	(Portugal) Estoril	(Egypt) Hassan Moustafa 103 / 122	(Austria) Erwin Lanc; Withdrew before election		
2004	(Egypt) El Gouna	(Egypt) Hassan Moustafa 85 / 134	(Sweden) Staffan Holmqvist 46 / 134		
2009	(Egypt) Cairo	(Egypt) Hassan Moustafa 115 / 142	(Luxembourg) Jean Kaiser 25 / 142		
2013	(Qatar) Doha	(Egypt) Hassan Moustafa 150 / 157	Unopposed		
2017	(Turkey) Antalya	(Egypt) Hassan Moustafa 104 / 117	Unopposed		
2021	(Turkey) Antalya	(Egypt) Hassan Moustafa 135 / 151	Unopposed		
2025	(Egypt) Cairo	(Egypt) Hassan Moustafa 129 / 176	(Slovenia) Franc Bobinac 24 / 176	(Germany) Gerd Butzeck 20 / 176	(Netherlands) Tjark de Lange 3 / 176

Preceded by Erwin Lanc	IHF President; 2000–present	Succeeded by Incumbent
