= Paul Högberg =

Paul Högberg (Sweden)

3rd President of International Handball Federation
- In office 23 August 1972 – 25 July 1984
- Preceded by: Himself as Interim President
- Succeeded by: Erwin Lanc

Interim President of International Handball Federation
- In office 9 February 1971 – 23 August 1972
- Preceded by: Hans Baumann
- Succeeded by: Himself as Interim President

4th President of Swedish Handball Federation
- In office 1948–1967
- Preceded by: Gösta Björk
- Succeeded by: Curt Wadmark

Personal details
- Born: 30 October 1911 Bollstabruk
- Died: 19 February 1999 (aged 87) Lidingö
- Profession: Sports administrator

Paul Högberg (30 October 1911 – 19 February 1999) was a Swedish sports administrator who served as the third President of International Handball Federation (IHF) from 1971 to 1984.

He was also the President of Swedish Handball Federation from 1948 to 1967. He died on 19 February 1999, aged 87.

Preceded by Hans Baumann	IHF President; 1971 - 1984	Succeeded by Erwin Lanc
