= IHF Congress =

- Legal status: Active
- Headquarters: Basel, Switzerland
- Official language: English, French, German
- President: Hassan Moustafa (Egypt)
- 1st Vice-President: Joël Delplanque (France)
- Parent organization: International Handball Federation
- Subsidiaries: IHF Council, IHF Executive Committee
- Website: ihf.info

The IHF Congress is the supreme legislative body of the International Handball Federation (French: Fédération Internationale de Handball), commonly known by the acronym IHF. IHF is the international governing body of handball, beach handball and wheelchair handball.

The congress may be ordinary or extraordinary. Ordinary congress shall place every two years (odd years) after the IHF World Men's Handball Championship. Each congress shall determine the date and place of the following ordinary congress. IHF bodies including the President, IHF Council and IHF Executive Committee shall be elected every four years at the congress taking place the year after the Summer Olympic Games.

Each of the 204 members of IHF has one vote in the congress. The members of IHF can propose candidates for the presidency of IHF and for IHF Council. The IHF Presidential election takes place at the congress in the year following the Summer Olympic Games.

The extraordinary congress shall be convened by the IHF Council upon the written request of a simple majority of the member federations or Council members. Extraordinary congress must be convened within three months of the receipt of the request.

== History ==
The IHF congress has been held since 1946. Before 31st Ordinary Congress 2007 in Madrid (Spain), the congresses were held in the even years.

IHF Presidential elections have taken place at every congress until the 14th IHF Congress 1972 in Nuremberg, West Germany, where the delegates decided to vote the elections to be held every four years in the Olympic rhythm.

== List of congresses ==
Congress voting for president
* Total number of member federations at the time of congress are mentioned. Total no. of members attending are unknown

Congress Number	Year	City	Member Federations Attending	Total No. of Member Federations
1st	1946	Copenhagen	8	14
2nd	1948	Paris	6	18
1st Extraordinary Congress	1948	Paris	14	18
3rd	1950	Vienna	13	21
4th	1952	Saarbrücken	16	22
5th	1954	Opatija	15	25
6th	1956	Stockholm	18	26
7th	1958	Garmisch-Partenkirchen	17	27
8th	1960	Liège	21	30
9th	1962	Madrid	24	34
10th	1964	Budapest	27	38
11th	1966	Copenhagen	26	39
12th	1968	Amsterdam	28	41
13th	1970	Madrid	36	54
14th	1972	Nuremberg	43	54
15th	1974	Jesolo	43	65
16th	1976	Estoril	41	68
17th	1978	Reykjavik	43	74
18th	1980	Moscow	52	80
19th	1982	London	53	86
20th	1984	San Diego	48	95
21st	1986	Dakar	49	98
22nd	1988	Seoul	69	101
23rd	1990	Madeira	47	106
24th	1992	Barcelona	62	123
25th	1994	Noordwijk	59	133
26th	1996	Hilton Head Island	79	138
27th	1998	Yamoussoukro	62	143
28th	2000	Estoril	122	146
29th	2002	Saint Petersburg	92	147
2nd Extraordinary Congress	2003	Basel	67	147
30th	2004	El Gouna	134	150
31st	2007	Madrid	120	159
32nd	2009	Cairo	139	171
3rd Extraordinary Congress	2010	Rome	Cancelled due to eruptions in Eyjafjallajökull volcano in Iceland.	171
33rd	2011	Marrakech	109	181
34th	2013	Doha	163	192
35th	2015	Sochi	141	198
4th Extraordinary Congress	2015	Sochi	124	198
36th	2017	Antalya	152	201
5th Extraordinary Congress	2019	Gothenburg	146	201
37th	2019	Gothenburg	151	201
38th	2021	(Switzerland) It was held through videoconferencing at IHF Head Office in Basel (SUI) due to COVID-19 pandemic. It was previously scheduled to be held in Antalya (TUR).	Future event	201
39th	2023	Katowice	Future event	201

== Presidential elections ==
Following table shows the results of election of the President of International Handball Federation in recent decades.

Election of the President of International Handball Federation
Year	Venue	Candidate 1	Candidate 2
2000	(Portugal) Estoril	(Egypt) Hassan Moustafa 103 / 122	(Austria) Erwin Lanc; Withdrew before election
2004	(Egypt) El Gouna	(Egypt) Hassan Moustafa 85 / 134	(Sweden) Staffan Holmqvist 46 / 134
2009	(Egypt) Cairo	(Egypt) Hassan Moustafa 115 / 142	(Luxembourg) Jean Kaiser 25 / 142
2013	(Qatar) Doha	(Egypt) Hassan Moustafa 150 / 157	Unopposed
2017	(Turkey) Antalya	(Egypt) Hassan Moustafa 104 / 117	Unopposed
2021	(Turkey) Antalya	(Egypt) Hassan Moustafa 135 / 151	Unopposed
