= IHF Council =

International Handball Federation institution

- Legal status: Active
- Headquarters: Basel, Switzerland
- Official language: English
- President: Hassan Moustafa (Egypt)
- 1st Vice-President: Joël Delplanque (France)
- Main organ: IHF Congress
- Parent organization: International Handball Federation
- Subsidiaries: IHF Executive Committee
- Staff: 19 (2017 – 2021)
- Website: www.IHF.info

The IHF Council is an institution of the International Handball Federation (the governing body of handball and beach handball). It is the main decision-making body of the organization in the intervals of IHF Congress. Its members are elected by the IHF Congress. The council is a non-executive, supervisory and strategic body that sets the vision for IHF and global handball.

== Composition ==
The council is made up of the following individuals:

- IHF President
- IHF 1st Vice-President
- AHF: one vice-president and one member
- CAHB: one vice-president and one member
- EHF: one vice-president and one member
- NACHC: one member
- OCHF: one member
- SCAHC: one member
- IHF Treasurer
- Two IHF Executive Members
- Chairperson of COC
- Chairperson of PRC
- Chairperson of CCM
- Chairperson of CD
- Chairperson of MC
- Chairperson of AC

== IHF Council 2025 — 2029 ==
Designation	Name	Country
President	Hassan Moustafa	Egypt
1st Vice-President	Philippe Bana	France
Vice-Presidents	Bader Mohammed Al-Theyab	Kuwait
Vice-Presidents	Michael Wiederer	Austria
Vice-Presidents	Mansourou Aremou	Benin
Treasurer	Anna Rapp	Sweden
Executive Members	Narcisa Lecușanu	Romania
Executive Members	Paco Blázquez García	Spain
Chairperson of IHF Commission of Organising And Competitions (COC)	Pascal Jenny	Switzerland
Chairperson of IHF Playing Rules and Referees Commission (PRC)	Per Morten Sødal	Norway
Chairperson of IHF Commission of Coaching and Methods (CCM)	Dietrich Späte	Germany
Chairperson of IHF Medical Commission (MC)	Yannick Mossus	Cameroon
Chairperson of IHF Commission for Development (CD)	Tomislav Grahovac	Croatia
Chairperson of IHF Athletes' Commission (ATC)	Gonzalo Pérez de Vargas	Spain
Representative of AHF	Ahmed Al-Shaabi	Qatar
Representative of CAHB	Marcel Amos Mbayo Kitenge	Democratic Republic of the Congo
Representative of EHF	Predrag Bošković	Montenegro
Representative of OCHF	Ricardo Blas	Guam
Representative of NACHC	Mario García de la Torre	Mexico
Representative of SCAHC	Marcel Mancilla Bravo	Chile

== General conditions ==
If a continental confederation has at least 15 national federations as full members, it may nominate a council member for the continent that shall be confirmed by the IHF Congress. Each continental confederation may nominate one vice-president if it has at least 23 national federations as full members. The council shall convene at least twice a year. The term of office of council members shall be four years; re-election is possible. In case of urgent business, the president may seek to make resolutions and decisions by mail between council meetings. Council is the body that awards the IHF World Men's Handball Championship and IHF World Women's Handball Championship.

== IHF Commission of Organising and Competitions ==
IHF Commission of Organising and Competitions (COC) is composed of one chairperson and seven members elected by the IHF Council.

Designation	Name	Country
Chairperson	Pascal Jenny	Switzerland
African Representative	Yazid Souadi	Morocco
Asian Representative	Absullah Al-Theyab	Kuwait
European Representative	Bozidar Djurkovic	Serbia
North America and Caribbean Representative	Kurt Lauritsen	Greenland
Oceania Representative	Makiroa Mitchell-John	Cook Islands
South and Central America Representative	Martin Chilaca	Bolivia
Members	Balázs Soós	Hungary

== IHF Playing Rules and Referees Commission ==
IHF Playing Rules and Referees Commission (PRC) is composed of one chairperson and seven members elected by the IHF Council.

Designation	Name	Country
Chairperson	Per Morten Sødal	Norway
African Representative	Mamoudou Diabate	Ivory Coast
Asian Representative	Saleh Ashour	United Arab Emirates
North America and Caribbean Representative	Alejandro Martinez	Mexico
Oceania Representative	Gaston Fuso	New Zealand
South and Central America Representative	Teodoro Adjemian	Argentina
Members	Bjarne Munk Jensen	Denmark

== IHF Commission of Coaching and Methods ==
IHF Commission of Coaching and Methods (CCM) is composed of one chairperson and seven members elected by the IHF Council.

Designation	Name	Country
Chairperson	Dietrich Späte	Germany
African Representative	Nahla Boudhina	Tunisia
Asian Representative	Dr. Nabeel Taha	Brunei
European Representative	Pedro Sequeira	Portugal
North America and Caribbean Representative	Franklyn Guevara	Cuba
South and Central America Representative	Eduardo Gallardo	Argentina
Members	Paul Landuré	France

== IHF Medical Commission ==
IHF Medical Commission (MC) is composed of one chairperson and seven members elected by the IHF Council.

Designation	Name	Country
Chairperson	Dr. Yannick Mossus	Cameroon
African Representative	Dr. Yannick Mossus	Cameroon
Asian Representative	Dr. Katsuhiko Sakuma	Japan
North America and Caribbean Representative	Dr. Llewellyn Harper	Barbados
South and Central America Representative	Dr. Alejandro Orizola	Chile
Members	Prof. Hazem Khamis	Egypt

== IHF Commission for Development ==
IHF Commission for Development (CD) is composed of one chairperson and seven members elected by the IHF Council.

Designation	Name	Country
Chairperson	Tomislav Grahovac	Croatia
African Representative	Nair Almeida	Angola
Asian Representative	Dr. Sari Hamdan	Jordan
European Representative	Francisco Blazquez Garcia	Spain
North America and Caribbean Representative	Carline Choute	Haiti
Oceania Representative	Carl J. Floor	American Samoa
South and Central America Representative	Cecilia Hernandez	El Salvador
Members	Stefan Albrechtson	Sweden

== IHF Athletes' Commission ==
IHF Athletes' Commission is composed of one chairperson and four members elected by the players participating in the Summer Olympic Games every four years.

Designation	Name	Country
Chairperson	Gonzalo Pérez de Vargas	Spain
Members	Mohammad Sanad	Egypt
Members	Dika Mem	France
Members	Xenia Smits	Germany
Members	Ana Gros	Slovenia

== IHF Arbitration Commission ==
IHF Arbitration Commission is composed of one chairperson and ten members elected by the IHF Congress.

Designation	Name	Country
Chairperson	Lovro Badžim	Croatia
Members	Mouadh Ben Zaied	Tunisia
Members	Miguel Fernandes	Portugal
Members	Elena Borrás Alcaraz	Spain
Members	Elizabeth Ling Yang	Hong Kong
Members	Nicolae Luca	Romania
Members	Muhammad Amir Yousaf	Pakistan
Members	David Hernández González	Mexico
Members	Santiago Nicolás Lorenzatto	Argentina
Members	Vacant	
Members	Vacant	

== IHF Arbitration Tribunal ==
IHF Arbitration Tribunal is composed of one chairperson and ten members elected by the IHF Congress.

Designation	Name	Country
Chairperson	Zoran Radojičić	Montenegro
Members	Pedro Mourão	Portugal
Members	Alazne Giraldo Iglesias	Spain
Members	Rémy Levy	France
Members	Barış Orhonlu	Turkey
Members	El Adli El Hanafi	Morocco
Members	Bibiana Bárbara Ferrea	Argentina
Members	Judith Amandine A. Goude-Djessin	Benin
Members	Terence Vembe	Nigeria
Members	Vacant	
Members	Vacant	

== IHF Ethics Commission ==
IHF Ethics Commission is composed of one chairperson and five members elected by the IHF Congress.

Designation	Name	Country
Chairperson	Hussein Moustafa Fathy	Egypt
Members	Jorge Pulido Vázquez	Mexico
Members	José Costa	Portugal
Members	David Barrufet Bofill	Spain
Members	Mamadouba Camara	Guinea
Members	Guy Oswald Yakass	Togo

== IHF Beach Handball Working Group ==
IHF Beach Handball Working Group (BHWG) is composed of one chairman and four members elected by the IHF Council.

Designation	Name	Country
Chairman	Giampiero Masi	Italy
Members	Ioannis Meimaridis	Greece
Members	Tamas Neukum	Hungary
Members	Oscar Miras	Spain
Members	Wellington Novaes Alves Esteves	Brazil

== IHF Handball at School Working Group ==
IHF Handball at School Working Group is composed of one chairwoman and two members elected by the IHF Council.

Designation	Name	Country
Chairwoman	Ilona Hapkova	Czech Republic
Members	Craig Rot	United States
Members	Dr. Nabeel Taha Al-Shebab	Bahrain
Members	Dr. Gerard Lasierra Aguila	Spain

== IHF Wheelchair Handball Working Group ==
IHF Wheelchair Handball Working Group is composed of one chairman and six members elected by the IHF Council.

Designation	Name	Country
Chairman	František Táborský	Czech Republic
Members	Flávio Anderson Pedrosa de Melo	Brazil
Members	Khalil El Haddaoui	Canada
Members	Muhammad Shafiq	Pakistan
Members	Dr Hossam Eldin Mostafa Saad	Egypt
Members	Eoin Murray	Ireland
Members	Pedro Sequeira	Portugal

== IHF Women’s Handball Working Group ==
IHF Women's Handball Working Group is composed of one chairwoman and four members elected by the IHF Council.

Designation	Name	Country
Chairwoman	Narcisa Lecușanu	Romania
Members	Bente Aksnes	Norway
Members	Lyudmila Bodniyeva	Russia
Members	Alexandra do Nascimento	Brazil
Members	Leonor Mallozzi	Portugal
Members	Gulnara Turlykhanova	Kazakhstan

== List of IHF secretaries general ==
The following is the list of IHF secretaries general.

S. No.	Name	Country	Term
1.	Carl Filip Borgh	Sweden	11 July 1946 – 9 September 1950
2.	Albert Wagner	Switzerland	9 September 1950 – 23 August 1972
3.	Max Rinkenburger	West Germany	23 August 1972 – 14 September 1988
4.	Raymond Hahn	France	14 September 1988 – 2 December 2004
5.	Peter Mühlematter	Switzerland	2 December 2004 – 4 June 2009
6.	Joël Delplanque	France	4 June 2009 – 2 May 2011
Post abolished on 2 May 2011. Since then the position is managed by a salaried Managing Director.
1.	Ms. Amal Khalifa	Egypt	2 May 2011 – present

== List of IHF treasurers ==
S. No.	Name	Country	Term
1.	Wolf Lyberg	Sweden	11 July 1946 – 9 September 1950
2.	Jan Krijgsman	Netherlands	9 September 1950 – 27 September 1954
3.	Max Rinkenburger	West Germany	27 September 1954 – 23 August 1972
4.	Anders Fredslund Pedersen	Denmark	23 August 1972 – 25 July 1984
5.	Raymond Hahn	France	25 July 1984 – 14 September 1988
6.	Rudi Glock	West Germany	14 September 1988 – 26 November 2000
7.	Miguel Roca Mas	Spain	26 November 2000 – 4 June 2009
8.	Sandi Šola*	Croatia	4 June 2009 – 19 December 2015
Acting	Miguel Roca Mas	Spain	19 December 2015 – 11 November 2017
9.	Anna Rapp	Sweden	11 November 2017 – present

- Sandi Šola was asked by IHF Council to resign during the IHF Council meeting held in Herning (Denmark) on 19 December 2015. Then IHF 1st Vice-President Miguel Roca Mas (Spain) held the charge until the next IHF Congress in 2017.

== List of IHF managing directors ==
S. No.	Name	Country	Term
1.	Friedhelm Peppmeier	West Germany	1973 – 1984
2.	Jörg Bahrke	West Germany	1984 – 1993
3.	Frank Birkefeld	Germany	1993 – 2007
4.	Ms. Amal Khalifa	Egypt	2007 – present
