= Erwin Lanc =

Austrian bank employee and politician (1930–2025)

2nd Honorary President of International Handball Federation
- In office 26 November 2000 – 29 March 2025
- President: Hassan Moustafa (Egypt)
- Vice President: Staffan Holmqvist (Sweden) (2000 – 2007) Miguel Roca Mas (Spain) (2009 – 2017) Joël Delplanque (France) (2017 – 2025)
- Preceded by: Paul Högberg (Sweden)

4th President of International Handball Federation
- In office 25 July 1984 – 26 November 2000
- Vice President: Vladimir Krivcov (Soviet Union) (1984 – 1992); Babacar Fall (Senegal) (1992 – 1996); Nabil Salem (Egypt) (1996 – 2000)
- Preceded by: Paul Högberg (Sweden)
- Succeeded by: Hassan Moustafa (Egypt)

Foreign Minister of Austria
- In office 24 May 1983 – 10 September 1984
- Chancellor: Fred Sinowatz
- Preceded by: Willibald Pahr
- Succeeded by: Leopold Gratz

Interior Minister of Austria
- In office 8 June 1977 – 24 April 1983
- Chancellor: Bruno Kreisky
- Preceded by: Otto Rösch
- Succeeded by: Karl Blecha

Minister of Transport
- In office 17 September 1973 – 8 June 1977
- Chancellor: Bruno Kreisky

Personal details
- Born: 17 May 1930 Vienna, Austria
- Died: 29 March 2025 (aged 94)
- Party: Social Democratic Party of Austria
- Education: University of Vienna
- Religion: Roman Catholicism

Erwin Lanc (17 May 1930 – 29 March 2025) was an Austrian bank employee and politician (SPÖ, Austrian Social Democratic Party).

== Life and career ==
Born in Vienna, Lanc worked at the Ministry of Social Affairs from 1949 to 1955. In 1959, he joined the Vienna-based Zentralsparkasse. In 1966, he became chairman of the SPÖ in the Margareten district of Vienna. He was a member of the Vienna city council and provincial parliament from 1960 to 1966. From 1966 to 1983 he was a member of the Nationalrat. In 1973, he joined the government as the Minister of Transport. In 1977 he became Minister of the Interior, and from 1983 to 1984 he served as Minister of Foreign Affairs. Lanc died on 29 March 2025, at the age of 94.
