= 2025 IHF Trophy U17 – North America and the Caribbean =

Women's Youth Handball Championship qualifier

Tournament details
- Host country: Canada
- Venue: 1 (in 1 host city)
- Dates: 12–16 November
- Teams: 6 (from 1 confederation)

Final positions
- Champions: Canada
- Runners-up: Mexico
- Third place: Cuba
- Fourth place: United States

Tournament statistics
- Matches played: 15

The 2025 IHF Trophy U17 – North America and the Caribbean took place in Mexico City, Mexico, from 12 to 16 November 2025. It acted as the North America and Caribbean qualifying tournament for the 2026 IHF Women's U18 Handball World Championship and 2026 IHF Inter-Continental Trophy.

Guadeloupe were the defending champions. Canada won the championship after winning the round robin and qualified for the World Championship alongside the runners-up, Mexico.

== Teams ==
- Canada
- Cuba
- Greenland
- Mexico
- Puerto Rico
- United States

== Standings ==
Pos	Team	Pld	W	D	L	GF	GA	GD	Pts	Qualification
1st place, gold medalist(s)	Canada	5	5	0	0	152	85	+67	10	2026 IHF Women's U18 Handball World Championship and 2026 IHF Inter-Continental Trophy
2nd place, silver medalist(s)	Mexico (H)	5	4	0	1	148	112	+36	8	2026 IHF Women's U18 Handball World Championship
3rd place, bronze medalist(s)	Cuba	5	3	0	2	145	142	+3	6	
4	United States	5	2	0	3	130	151	−21	4	
5	Greenland	5	1	0	4	113	148	−35	2	
6	Puerto Rico	5	0	0	5	126	176	−50	0	

Source: 2025 IHF Trophy U17 – North America and the Caribbean
Rules for classification: 1) Points; 2) Head-to-head points; 3) Head-to-head goal difference; 4) Head-to-head goals scored; 5) Goal difference; 6) Goals scored; 7) Draw.
(H) Hosts

== Results ==
All times are local.

12 November 2025; 15:00	Puerto Rico	19–30	United States	Mexican Olympic Training Center, Mexico City
12 November 2025; 15:00		(7–16)		Mexican Olympic Training Center, Mexico City
12 November 2025; 15:00		Report		Mexican Olympic Training Center, Mexico City

12 November 2025; 17:00	Mexico	29–23	Greenland	Mexican Olympic Training Center, Mexico City
12 November 2025; 17:00		(9–12)		Mexican Olympic Training Center, Mexico City
12 November 2025; 17:00		Report		Mexican Olympic Training Center, Mexico City

12 November 2025; 19:00	Canada	32–16	Cuba	Mexican Olympic Training Center, Mexico City
12 November 2025; 19:00		(17–7)		Mexican Olympic Training Center, Mexico City
12 November 2025; 19:00		Report		Mexican Olympic Training Center, Mexico City

13 November 2025; 15:00	Puerto Rico	21–35	Canada	Mexican Olympic Training Center, Mexico City
13 November 2025; 15:00		(8–17)		Mexican Olympic Training Center, Mexico City
13 November 2025; 15:00		Report		Mexican Olympic Training Center, Mexico City

13 November 2025; 17:00	United States	30–28	Greenland	Mexican Olympic Training Center, Mexico City
13 November 2025; 17:00		(18–13)		Mexican Olympic Training Center, Mexico City
13 November 2025; 17:00		Report		Mexican Olympic Training Center, Mexico City

13 November 2025; 19:00	Mexico	35–26	Cuba	Mexican Olympic Training Center, Mexico City
13 November 2025; 19:00		(16–9)		Mexican Olympic Training Center, Mexico City
13 November 2025; 19:00		Report		Mexican Olympic Training Center, Mexico City

14 November 2025; 15:00	Canada	37–23	United States	Mexican Olympic Training Center, Mexico City
14 November 2025; 15:00		(15–9)		Mexican Olympic Training Center, Mexico City
14 November 2025; 15:00		Report		Mexican Olympic Training Center, Mexico City

14 November 2025; 17:00	Cuba	29–17	Greenland	Mexican Olympic Training Center, Mexico City
14 November 2025; 17:00		(14–8)		Mexican Olympic Training Center, Mexico City
14 November 2025; 17:00		Report		Mexican Olympic Training Center, Mexico City

14 November 2025; 19:00	Mexico	35–23	Puerto Rico	Mexican Olympic Training Center, Mexico City
14 November 2025; 19:00		(–)		Mexican Olympic Training Center, Mexico City
14 November 2025; 19:00		Report		Mexican Olympic Training Center, Mexico City

15 November 2025; 15:00	Cuba	41–30	Puerto Rico	Mexican Olympic Training Center, Mexico City
15 November 2025; 15:00		(21–13)		Mexican Olympic Training Center, Mexico City
15 November 2025; 15:00		Report		Mexican Olympic Training Center, Mexico City

15 November 2025; 17:00	Greenland	10–27	Canada	Mexican Olympic Training Center, Mexico City
15 November 2025; 17:00		(3–14)		Mexican Olympic Training Center, Mexico City
15 November 2025; 17:00		Report		Mexican Olympic Training Center, Mexico City

15 November 2025; 19:00	United States	19–34	Mexico	Mexican Olympic Training Center, Mexico City
15 November 2025; 19:00		(7–18)		Mexican Olympic Training Center, Mexico City
15 November 2025; 19:00		Report		Mexican Olympic Training Center, Mexico City

16 November 2025; 15:00	Cuba	33–28	United States	Mexican Olympic Training Center, Mexico City
16 November 2025; 15:00		(16–13)		Mexican Olympic Training Center, Mexico City
16 November 2025; 15:00		Report		Mexican Olympic Training Center, Mexico City

16 November 2025; 17:00	Canada	21–15	Mexico	Mexican Olympic Training Center, Mexico City
16 November 2025; 17:00		(13–7)		Mexican Olympic Training Center, Mexico City
16 November 2025; 17:00		Report		Mexican Olympic Training Center, Mexico City

16 November 2025; 19:00	Greenland	35–33	Puerto Rico	Mexican Olympic Training Center, Mexico City
16 November 2025; 19:00		(17–14)		Mexican Olympic Training Center, Mexico City
16 November 2025; 19:00		Report		Mexican Olympic Training Center, Mexico City

== Awards ==
=== All-star team ===
- Best goalkeeper: (Canada) Roy Roseline
- Best right wing: (Mexico) Camila Aguilera
- Best right back: (United States) Hanna Schlueter
- Best centre back: (Puerto Rico) Loreanie Rodriguez
- Best left back: (Canada) Azalee Morisette-Davis
- Best left wing: (Mexico) Andrea Rodela
- Best line player: (Greenland) Arnanguaq Berthelsen

=== Most valuable player ===
- (Canada) Azalee Morisette-Davis

=== Top scorer ===
- (Puerto Rico) Loreanie Rodriguez

=== Best defender ===
- (United States) Lisa Ready

== See also ==
- Nor.Ca. Women's Handball Championship
- 2026 IHF Women's U18 Handball World Championship
- 2026 IHF Inter-Continental Trophy
