= 2026 IHF Women's U18 Handball World Championship =

IHF Women's U18 Handball World Championship

Tournament details
- Host country: Romania
- Venues: 4 (in 4 host cities)
- Dates: 29 July – 9 August
- Teams: 32 (from 6 confederations)

Final positions
- Champions: Spain (2nd title)
- Runners-up: Montenegro
- Third place: Denmark
- Fourth place: Egypt

Tournament statistics
- Matches played: 116
- Goals scored: 6,459 (55.68 per match)
- Top scorers: (Switzerland) Lauryn Mierzwa (71 goals)

Awards
- Best player: (Spain) Elene Fresco

The 2026 IHF Women's U18 Handball World Championship was the 11th edition of the IHF Women's U18 Handball World Championship, the biennial international handball championship organised under the aegis of IHF for the women's U18 national teams across the world. It was held in Romania for the first time, from 29 July to 9 August 2026.

For the third time, 32 teams took part, following the expansion in 2022. Continental championships also served as qualifications for the world championship and were played between July 2025 and April 2026. The hosts, Romania, qualified automatically. Fiji and Mexico made their debut, with the former becoming the first Pacific island nation to take part.

Spain were the defending champions, having beaten Denmark 23–22 at the 2024 final in Chuzhou, and defended their title with a win over Montenegro in the final, 26–23.

== Qualification ==
Team	Qualification method	Date of qualification	Appearance(s)				Previous best performance (Note: Bold text indicates they hosted that edition.)
Team	Qualification method	Date of qualification	Total	First	Last	Streak	Previous best performance
Japan	2025 Asian Youth Championship	19 July 2025	9th	2006	2024	2	Seventh place (2006)
South Korea	2025 Asian Youth Championship	19 July 2025	10th	2006	2024	10	Champions (2022)
China	2025 Asian Youth Championship	21 July 2025	5th	2014	2024	2	15th place (2024)
Kazakhstan	2025 Asian Youth Championship	21 July 2025	8th	2010	2024	8	16th place (2010, 2012)
Croatia	2025 European U-17 Championship	4 August 2025	7th	2012	2024	7	Seventh place (2024)
Switzerland	2025 European U-17 Championship	4 August 2025	3rd	2022	2024	3	14th place (2024)
Montenegro	2025 European U-17 Championship	5 August 2025	6th	2012	2024	4	Fourth place (2014)
Denmark	2025 European U-17 Championship	5 August 2025	10th	2006	2024	10	Champions (2006, 2012)
France	2025 European U-17 Championship	5 August 2025	10th	2006	2024	10	Fourth place (2006, 2008, 2010, 2024)
Hungary	2025 European U-17 Championship	5 August 2025	8th	2010	2024	8	Runners-up (2018)
Slovakia	2025 European U-17 Championship	5 August 2025	5th	2008	2022	1	Seventh place (2008)
Spain	2025 European U-17 Championship	5 August 2025	7th	2008	2024	5	Champions (2024)
Sweden	2025 European U-17 Championship	7 August 2025	8th	2010	2024	8	Champions (2010)
Serbia	2025 European U-17 Championship	7 August 2025	3rd	2008	2024	2	Runners-up (2008)
Germany	2025 European U-17 Championship	7 August 2025	7th	2010	2024	6	Runners-up (2014)
Czech Republic	2025 European U-17 Championship	7 August 2025	4th	2012	2024	3	Ninth place (2024)
Netherlands	2025 European U-17 Championship	8 August 2025	8th	2008	2024	4	Third place (2010)
Slovenia	2025 European U-17 Championship	8 August 2025	4th	2006	2022	1	Fifth place (2006)
Egypt	2025 African Youth Championship	18 September 2025	5th	2016	2024	5	Seventh place (2022)
Tunisia	2025 African Youth Championship	18 September 2025	5th	2006	2018	1	Eleventh place (2006)
Angola	2025 African Youth Championship	18 September 2025	8th	2008	2024	2	Eighth place (2008)
Guinea	2025 African Youth Championship	19 September 2025	3rd	2022	2024	3	29th place (2022)
Fiji	2025 IHF Trophy U17 – Oceania	16 October 2025	1st	Debut			
Canada	2025 IHF Trophy U17 – North America and the Caribbean	15 November 2025	3rd	2006	2024	2	Tenth place (2006)
Mexico	2025 IHF Trophy U17 – North America and the Caribbean	15 November 2025	1st	Debut			
Argentina	2025 South and Central American Youth Championship	19 November 2025	9th	2006	2024	6	Sixth place (2006)
Brazil	2025 South and Central American Youth Championship	19 November 2025	9th	2006	2024	3	Seventh place (2014)
Uruguay	2025 South and Central American Youth Championship	19 November 2025	4th	2010	2022	1	Twelfth place (2010)
Uzbekistan	2025 IHF Trophy U17 – Asia	22 November 2025	4th	2014	2022	1	24th place (2014, 2016, 2022)
Romania	Host nation	9 January 2026	8th	2006	2024	7	Champions (2014)
Algeria (Note: Since the 2026 IHF Inter-Continental Trophy winners, Guinea, had already qualified via the African Championship, the spot was given to the next best team in the African Championship, being fifth-placed Nigeria. However, Nigeria waived its right to participate in the World Championship, so sixth-placed Algeria eventually qualified.)	2025 African Youth Championship		2nd	2022		1	32nd place (2022)
Portugal	Wildcard		4th	2012	2022	1	Eleventh place (2014)

== Draw ==
The draw was held on 8 May 2026 in Basel, Switzerland.

=== Seeding ===
The seeding was announced on 16 March 2026.

Pot 1	Pot 2	Pot 3	Pot 4
Slovakia; Croatia; Montenegro; Spain; Switzerland; Denmark; Hungary; China	France; Czechia; Argentina; Serbia; Romania; Germany; Sweden; Japan	Netherlands; Slovenia; Brazil; South Korea; Egypt; Kazakhstan; Tunisia; Guinea	Uzbekistan; Uruguay; Angola; Canada; Mexico; Portugal (Note: Team not determined at time of draw); Fiji; Algeria

== Referees ==
The referees were announced on 20 April 2026.

Referees
Argentina/Uruguay	Agustín Converse; Germán Araújo
Brazil	Henrique Godoy; Daniel Magalhães
Croatia	Matija Hodžić; Matija Brodić
Cuba	Raymel Reyes; Alexis Zuñiga
Denmark	Jacob Pagh; Karl Thygesen
Egypt	Mohamed Esmail; Mohamed Saleh
France	Titouan Picard; Pierre Vauchez
Germany	Lucas Hellbusch; Darnel Jansen

Referees
Greece	Ioannis Fotakidis; Charalampos Kinatzidis
Hungary	Rita Dáné; Zsófia Marton
Japan	Hideki Furukawa; Tetsuro Murata
Kuwait	Maali Al-Enezi; Dalal Al-Naseem
North Macedonia	Danielo Bozhinovski; Viktor Nachevski
Montenegro	Slađane Martinović; Milice Pavićević
Netherlands	William Weijmans; Rick Wolbertus

Referees
Norway	Andreas Borge; Magnus Nygren
Oman	Omer Al-Shahi; Khamis Al-Wahibi
Romania	Mihaela Chiruță; Georgiana Murariu
Romania	Mihai Pîrvu; Mihai Potîrniche
Slovenia	Žan Pukšič; Miha Satler
Sweden	Alice Watson; Line Welin
Tunisia	Roua Haggui; Sahar Haggui

== Preliminary round ==
All times are local (UTC+3).

=== Group A ===
Pos	Team	Pld	W	D	L	GF	GA	GD	Pts	Qualification
1	Egypt	3	3	0	0	139	65	+74	6	Main round
2	France	3	2	0	1	108	58	+50	4	Main round
3	Croatia	3	1	0	2	118	60	+58	2	Presidents Cup
4	Fiji	3	0	0	3	23	205	−182	0	Presidents Cup

Source: IHF
Rules for classification: 1) points; 2) head-to-head points; 3) head-to-head goal difference; 4) head-to-head number of goals scored; 5) goal difference.

29 July 2026; 11:45	Croatia	24–27	Egypt	Polyvalent Hall, Craiova; Attendance: 90; Referees: Fotakidis, Kinatzidis (GRE)
29 July 2026; 11:45	Jerković 6	(13–13)	Abdallah 8	Polyvalent Hall, Craiova; Attendance: 90; Referees: Fotakidis, Kinatzidis (GRE)
29 July 2026; 11:45	2× (suspension)	Report	3× (suspension)	Polyvalent Hall, Craiova; Attendance: 90; Referees: Fotakidis, Kinatzidis (GRE)

29 July 2026; 14:00	France	55–2	Fiji	Polyvalent Hall, Craiova; Attendance: 80; Referees: Furukawa, Murata (JPN)
29 July 2026; 14:00	Mpioso 10	(27–1)	R. Logavatu, Vuniwai 1	Polyvalent Hall, Craiova; Attendance: 80; Referees: Furukawa, Murata (JPN)
29 July 2026; 14:00		Report	2× (yellow card) 2× (suspension)	Polyvalent Hall, Craiova; Attendance: 80; Referees: Furukawa, Murata (JPN)

30 July 2026; 11:45	Fiji	4–67	Croatia	Polyvalent Hall, Craiova; Attendance: 90; Referees: Haggui, Haggui (TUN)
30 July 2026; 11:45	Buituni 2	(2–33)	Hajdinjak 19	Polyvalent Hall, Craiova; Attendance: 90; Referees: Haggui, Haggui (TUN)
30 July 2026; 11:45	1× (yellow card) 5× (suspension)	Report		Polyvalent Hall, Craiova; Attendance: 90; Referees: Haggui, Haggui (TUN)

30 July 2026; 14:00	France	24–29	Egypt	Polyvalent Hall, Craiova; Attendance: 350; Referees: Bozhinovski, Nachevski (MKD)
30 July 2026; 14:00	Berthelot, Saramito 4	(11–14)	Abdelnaser 7	Polyvalent Hall, Craiova; Attendance: 350; Referees: Bozhinovski, Nachevski (MKD)
30 July 2026; 14:00	2× (suspension)	Report	4× (suspension)	Polyvalent Hall, Craiova; Attendance: 350; Referees: Bozhinovski, Nachevski (MKD)

1 August 2026; 11:45	Egypt	83–17	Fiji	Polyvalent Hall, Craiova; Attendance: 160; Referees: Correa (ARG), Araújo ( URU)
1 August 2026; 11:45	Abouelazaiem 17	(43–9)	Buituni 9	Polyvalent Hall, Craiova; Attendance: 160; Referees: Correa (ARG), Araújo ( URU)
1 August 2026; 11:45	2× (suspension)	Report	7× (suspension)	Polyvalent Hall, Craiova; Attendance: 160; Referees: Correa (ARG), Araújo ( URU)

1 August 2026; 14:00	Croatia	27–29	France	Polyvalent Hall, Craiova; Attendance: 195; Referees: Dáné, Marton (HUN)
1 August 2026; 14:00	Košćec 7	(14–11)	Buisson 7	Polyvalent Hall, Craiova; Attendance: 195; Referees: Dáné, Marton (HUN)
1 August 2026; 14:00	1× (yellow card) 3× (suspension)	Report	1× (suspension)	Polyvalent Hall, Craiova; Attendance: 195; Referees: Dáné, Marton (HUN)

=== Group B ===
Pos	Team	Pld	W	D	L	GF	GA	GD	Pts	Qualification
1	Denmark	3	3	0	0	103	63	+40	6	Main round
2	South Korea	3	2	0	1	96	73	+23	4	Main round
3	Czech Republic	3	1	0	2	86	63	+23	2	Presidents Cup
4	Mexico	3	0	0	3	43	129	−86	0	Presidents Cup

Updated to match(es) played on 30 July 2026. Source: IHF
Rules for classification: 1) points; 2) head-to-head points; 3) head-to-head goal difference; 4) head-to-head number of goals scored; 5) goal difference.

29 July 2026; 16:15	Denmark	33–32	South Korea	Polyvalent Hall, Craiova; Attendance: 235; Referees: Haggui, Haggui (TUN)
29 July 2026; 16:15	Spellerberg 9	(15–13)	Kim E. 9	Polyvalent Hall, Craiova; Attendance: 235; Referees: Haggui, Haggui (TUN)
29 July 2026; 16:15	1× (yellow card) 2× (suspension)	Report	2× (suspension)	Polyvalent Hall, Craiova; Attendance: 235; Referees: Haggui, Haggui (TUN)

29 July 2026; 18:30	Czech Republic	42–16	Mexico	Polyvalent Hall, Craiova; Attendance: 185; Referees: Bozhinovski, Nachevski (MKD)
29 July 2026; 18:30	Máčalová 9	(22–5)	three players 3	Polyvalent Hall, Craiova; Attendance: 185; Referees: Bozhinovski, Nachevski (MKD)
29 July 2026; 18:30		Report	1× (suspension)	Polyvalent Hall, Craiova; Attendance: 185; Referees: Bozhinovski, Nachevski (MKD)

30 July 2026; 16:15	Mexico	10–47	Denmark	Polyvalent Hall, Craiova; Attendance: 120; Referees: Dáné, Marton (HUN)
30 July 2026; 16:15	Aguilera 4	(5–24)	Poulsen 10	Polyvalent Hall, Craiova; Attendance: 120; Referees: Dáné, Marton (HUN)
30 July 2026; 16:15	1× (suspension)	Report	2× (suspension)	Polyvalent Hall, Craiova; Attendance: 120; Referees: Dáné, Marton (HUN)

30 July 2026; 18:30	Czech Republic	23–24	South Korea	Polyvalent Hall, Craiova; Attendance: 260; Referees: Correa (ARG), Araújo ( URU)
30 July 2026; 18:30	Königová 6	(13–10)	Kim E., Lee S. 5	Polyvalent Hall, Craiova; Attendance: 260; Referees: Correa (ARG), Araújo ( URU)
30 July 2026; 18:30	5× (suspension) 1× (red card)	Report	4× (suspension)	Polyvalent Hall, Craiova; Attendance: 260; Referees: Correa (ARG), Araújo ( URU)

1 August 2026; 16:15	South Korea	40–17	Mexico	Polyvalent Hall, Craiova; Attendance: 105; Referees: Fotakidis, Kinatzidis (GRE)
1 August 2026; 16:15	four players 5	(19–12)	five players 3	Polyvalent Hall, Craiova; Attendance: 105; Referees: Fotakidis, Kinatzidis (GRE)
1 August 2026; 16:15	1× (suspension)	Report	2× (suspension)	Polyvalent Hall, Craiova; Attendance: 105; Referees: Fotakidis, Kinatzidis (GRE)

1 August 2026; 18:30	Denmark	23–21	Czech Republic	Polyvalent Hall, Craiova; Attendance: 310; Referees: Furukawa, Murata (JPN)
1 August 2026; 18:30	Nørby 7	(11–14)	Janků, Königová 5	Polyvalent Hall, Craiova; Attendance: 310; Referees: Furukawa, Murata (JPN)
1 August 2026; 18:30	1× (yellow card) 3× (suspension)	Report	2× (suspension)	Polyvalent Hall, Craiova; Attendance: 310; Referees: Furukawa, Murata (JPN)

=== Group C ===
Pos	Team	Pld	W	D	L	GF	GA	GD	Pts	Qualification
1	Spain	3	3	0	0	100	58	+42	6	Main round
2	Germany	3	2	0	1	104	61	+43	4	Main round
3	Guinea	3	0	1	2	55	85	−30	1 (Note: Guinea 22–22 Uzbekistan)	Presidents Cup
4	Uzbekistan	3	0	1	2	57	112	−55	1	Presidents Cup

Source: IHF
Rules for classification: 1) points; 2) head-to-head points; 3) head-to-head goal difference; 4) head-to-head number of goals scored; 5) goal difference.
Notes:

29 July 2026; 11:45	Spain	27–12	Guinea	Sala Sporturilor, Mioveni; Attendance: 70; Referees: Al-Shahi, Al-Wahibi (OMA)
29 July 2026; 11:45	Vladu 5	(14–2)	Soumah 7	Sala Sporturilor, Mioveni; Attendance: 70; Referees: Al-Shahi, Al-Wahibi (OMA)
29 July 2026; 11:45	1× (suspension)	Report	8× (suspension)	Sala Sporturilor, Mioveni; Attendance: 70; Referees: Al-Shahi, Al-Wahibi (OMA)

29 July 2026; 14:00	Germany	44–13	Uzbekistan	Sala Sporturilor, Mioveni; Attendance: 79; Referees: Chiruță, Murariu (ROU)
29 July 2026; 14:00	Overbeck 10	(20–4)	Keldiyorova 5	Sala Sporturilor, Mioveni; Attendance: 79; Referees: Chiruță, Murariu (ROU)
29 July 2026; 14:00	1× (suspension)	Report	2× (suspension) 2× (red card)	Sala Sporturilor, Mioveni; Attendance: 79; Referees: Chiruță, Murariu (ROU)

30 July 2026; 11:45	Uzbekistan	22–46	Spain	Sala Sporturilor, Mioveni; Attendance: 72; Referees: Pukšič, Satler (SLO)
30 July 2026; 11:45	Bayjanova 9	(12–25)	Vladu 8	Sala Sporturilor, Mioveni; Attendance: 72; Referees: Pukšič, Satler (SLO)
30 July 2026; 11:45	1× (suspension)	Report	3× (suspension)	Sala Sporturilor, Mioveni; Attendance: 72; Referees: Pukšič, Satler (SLO)

30 July 2026; 14:00	Germany	36–21	Guinea	Sala Sporturilor, Mioveni; Attendance: 85; Referees: Godoy, Magalhães (BRA)
30 July 2026; 14:00	Overbeck, Stenzel 8	(18–8)	Soumah 6	Sala Sporturilor, Mioveni; Attendance: 85; Referees: Godoy, Magalhães (BRA)
30 July 2026; 14:00		Report	4× (suspension)	Sala Sporturilor, Mioveni; Attendance: 85; Referees: Godoy, Magalhães (BRA)

1 August 2026; 11:45	Guinea	22–22	Uzbekistan	Sala Sporturilor, Mioveni; Attendance: 56; Referees: Borge, Nygren (NOR)
1 August 2026; 11:45	Mansare 7	(12–11)	Keldiyorova 7	Sala Sporturilor, Mioveni; Attendance: 56; Referees: Borge, Nygren (NOR)
1 August 2026; 11:45	6× (suspension)	Report	3× (suspension)	Sala Sporturilor, Mioveni; Attendance: 56; Referees: Borge, Nygren (NOR)

1 August 2026; 14:00	Spain	27–24	Germany	Sala Sporturilor, Mioveni; Attendance: 110; Referees: Picard, Vauchez (FRA)
1 August 2026; 14:00	Berroeta, Ferrer 5	(13–11)	Rusko 6	Sala Sporturilor, Mioveni; Attendance: 110; Referees: Picard, Vauchez (FRA)
1 August 2026; 14:00	1× (suspension)	Report	4× (suspension)	Sala Sporturilor, Mioveni; Attendance: 110; Referees: Picard, Vauchez (FRA)

=== Group D ===
Pos	Team	Pld	W	D	L	GF	GA	GD	Pts	Qualification
1	Montenegro	3	3	0	0	90	79	+11	6	Main round
2	Netherlands	3	2	0	1	86	76	+10	4	Main round
3	Portugal	3	1	0	2	90	79	+11	2	Presidents Cup
4	Argentina	3	0	0	3	64	96	−32	0	Presidents Cup

Updated to match(es) played on 30 July 2026. Source: IHF
Rules for classification: 1) points; 2) head-to-head points; 3) head-to-head goal difference; 4) head-to-head number of goals scored; 5) goal difference.

29 July 2026; 16:15	Montenegro	27–26	Netherlands	Sala Sporturilor, Mioveni; Attendance: 120; Referees: Picard, Vauchez (FRA)
29 July 2026; 16:15	Burzanović 8	(14–12)	Kwakman 8	Sala Sporturilor, Mioveni; Attendance: 120; Referees: Picard, Vauchez (FRA)
29 July 2026; 16:15	1× (yellow card) 2× (suspension)	Report	3× (suspension)	Sala Sporturilor, Mioveni; Attendance: 120; Referees: Picard, Vauchez (FRA)

29 July 2026; 18:30	Argentina	18–34	Portugal	Sala Sporturilor, Mioveni; Referees: Pukšič, Satler (SLO)
29 July 2026; 18:30	Giménez 5	(9–17)	Bernardino 10	Sala Sporturilor, Mioveni; Referees: Pukšič, Satler (SLO)
29 July 2026; 18:30	3× (suspension)	Report	5× (suspension)	Sala Sporturilor, Mioveni; Referees: Pukšič, Satler (SLO)

30 July 2026; 16:15	Portugal	28–31	Montenegro	Sala Sporturilor, Mioveni; Attendance: 86; Referees: Borge, Nygren (NOR)
30 July 2026; 16:15	Bernardino, Lopes 8	(12–19)	Dragnić 11	Sala Sporturilor, Mioveni; Attendance: 86; Referees: Borge, Nygren (NOR)
30 July 2026; 16:15	6× (suspension)	Report	3× (suspension)	Sala Sporturilor, Mioveni; Attendance: 86; Referees: Borge, Nygren (NOR)

30 July 2026; 18:30	Argentina	21–30	Netherlands	Sala Sporturilor, Mioveni; Attendance: 82; Referees: Al-Enezi, Al-Naseem (KUW)
30 July 2026; 18:30	Podesta 5	(11–17)	Kwakman, Ostojic 4	Sala Sporturilor, Mioveni; Attendance: 82; Referees: Al-Enezi, Al-Naseem (KUW)
30 July 2026; 18:30	1× (suspension)	Report	4× (suspension)	Sala Sporturilor, Mioveni; Attendance: 82; Referees: Al-Enezi, Al-Naseem (KUW)

1 August 2026; 16:15	Netherlands	30–28	Portugal	Sala Sporturilor, Mioveni; Attendance: 115; Referees: Bozhinovski, Nachevski (MKD)
1 August 2026; 16:15	Kwakman 8	(15–12)	Bernardino 6	Sala Sporturilor, Mioveni; Attendance: 115; Referees: Bozhinovski, Nachevski (MKD)
1 August 2026; 16:15	7× (suspension)	Report	3× (suspension)	Sala Sporturilor, Mioveni; Attendance: 115; Referees: Bozhinovski, Nachevski (MKD)

1 August 2026; 18:30	Montenegro	32–25	Argentina	Sala Sporturilor, Mioveni; Attendance: 86; Referees: Al-Shahi, Al-Wahibi (OMA)
1 August 2026; 18:30	Savić 7	(15–11)	Podesta 5	Sala Sporturilor, Mioveni; Attendance: 86; Referees: Al-Shahi, Al-Wahibi (OMA)
1 August 2026; 18:30	3× (suspension)	Report	2× (suspension)	Sala Sporturilor, Mioveni; Attendance: 86; Referees: Al-Shahi, Al-Wahibi (OMA)

=== Group E ===
Pos	Team	Pld	W	D	L	GF	GA	GD	Pts	Qualification
1	Hungary	3	3	0	0	128	73	+55	6	Main round
2	Sweden	3	2	0	1	98	68	+30	4	Main round
3	Tunisia	3	1	0	2	80	89	−9	2	Presidents Cup
4	Canada	3	0	0	3	45	121	−76	0	Presidents Cup

Source: IHF
Rules for classification: 1) points; 2) head-to-head points; 3) head-to-head goal difference; 4) head-to-head number of goals scored; 5) goal difference.

29 July 2026; 11:45	Hungary	40–29	Tunisia	Pitești Arena, Pitești; Attendance: 57; Referees: Hodžić, Brodić (CRO)
29 July 2026; 11:45	Szigeti 11	(16–12)	Ouni, Slama 9	Pitești Arena, Pitești; Attendance: 57; Referees: Hodžić, Brodić (CRO)
29 July 2026; 11:45	7× (suspension) 1× (red card)	Report	6× (suspension) 1× (red card)	Pitești Arena, Pitești; Attendance: 57; Referees: Hodžić, Brodić (CRO)

29 July 2026; 14:00	Sweden	36–14	Canada	Pitești Arena, Pitești; Attendance: 120; Referees: Martinović, Pavićević (MNE)
29 July 2026; 14:00	Karlsson 6	(16–9)	Morisette-Davies 6	Pitești Arena, Pitești; Attendance: 120; Referees: Martinović, Pavićević (MNE)
29 July 2026; 14:00	7× (suspension)	Report	8× (suspension)	Pitești Arena, Pitești; Attendance: 120; Referees: Martinović, Pavićević (MNE)

30 July 2026; 11:45	Canada	15–53	Hungary	Pitești Arena, Pitești; Attendance: 74; Referees: Al-Shahi, Al-Wahibi (OMA)
30 July 2026; 11:45	Morisette-Davies 7	(7–25)	Léránt, Somogyi 7	Pitești Arena, Pitești; Attendance: 74; Referees: Al-Shahi, Al-Wahibi (OMA)
30 July 2026; 11:45	1× (suspension)	Report		Pitești Arena, Pitești; Attendance: 74; Referees: Al-Shahi, Al-Wahibi (OMA)

30 July 2026; 14:00	Sweden	33–19	Tunisia	Pitești Arena, Pitești; Attendance: 69; Referees: Hellbusch, Jansen (GER)
30 July 2026; 14:00	three players 5	(13–6)	Chaaban, Slama 7	Pitești Arena, Pitești; Attendance: 69; Referees: Hellbusch, Jansen (GER)
30 July 2026; 14:00	5× (suspension)	Report	1× (yellow card) 2× (suspension)	Pitești Arena, Pitești; Attendance: 69; Referees: Hellbusch, Jansen (GER)

1 August 2026; 11:45	Tunisia	32–16	Canada	Pitești Arena, Pitești; Attendance: 55; Referees: Chiruță, Murariu (ROU)
1 August 2026; 11:45	Ouni 9	(15–7)	three players 3	Pitești Arena, Pitești; Attendance: 55; Referees: Chiruță, Murariu (ROU)
1 August 2026; 11:45	5× (suspension)	Report	2× (suspension)	Pitești Arena, Pitești; Attendance: 55; Referees: Chiruță, Murariu (ROU)

1 August 2026; 14:00	Hungary	35–29	Sweden	Pitești Arena, Pitești; Attendance: 117; Referees: Pukšič, Satler (SLO)
1 August 2026; 14:00	Keller, Szigeti 8	(21–16)	Elmblad, Wong 5	Pitești Arena, Pitești; Attendance: 117; Referees: Pukšič, Satler (SLO)
1 August 2026; 14:00	3× (suspension)	Report	1× (yellow card) 3× (suspension)	Pitești Arena, Pitești; Attendance: 117; Referees: Pukšič, Satler (SLO)

=== Group F ===
Pos	Team	Pld	W	D	L	GF	GA	GD	Pts	Qualification
1	China	3	3	0	0	108	63	+45	6	Main round
2	Romania (H)	3	2	0	1	91	60	+31	4	Main round
3	Kazakhstan	3	1	0	2	56	105	−49	2	Presidents Cup
4	Uruguay	3	0	0	3	63	90	−27	0	Presidents Cup

Source: IHF
Rules for classification: 1) points; 2) head-to-head points; 3) head-to-head goal difference; 4) head-to-head number of goals scored; 5) goal difference.
(H) Hosts

29 July 2026; 16:15	China	43–17	Kazakhstan	Pitești Arena, Pitești; Attendance: 88; Referees: Hellbusch, Jansen (GER)
29 July 2026; 16:15	Zhang S. 8	(22–9)	Kopzhan 6	Pitești Arena, Pitești; Attendance: 88; Referees: Hellbusch, Jansen (GER)
29 July 2026; 16:15	1× (suspension)	Report	3× (suspension)	Pitești Arena, Pitești; Attendance: 88; Referees: Hellbusch, Jansen (GER)

29 July 2026; 18:30	Romania	30–16	Uruguay	Pitești Arena, Pitești; Attendance: 314; Referees: Al-Enezi, Al-Naseem (KUW)
29 July 2026; 18:30	Sălăjan 7	(12–8)	Olmos, Marti 4	Pitești Arena, Pitești; Attendance: 314; Referees: Al-Enezi, Al-Naseem (KUW)
29 July 2026; 18:30	3× (suspension)	Report	4× (suspension)	Pitești Arena, Pitești; Attendance: 314; Referees: Al-Enezi, Al-Naseem (KUW)

30 July 2026; 16:15	Uruguay	22–34	China	Pitești Arena, Pitești; Attendance: 59; Referees: Hodžić, Brodić (CRO)
30 July 2026; 16:15	Olmos 8	(8–18)	Zhang S. 9	Pitești Arena, Pitești; Attendance: 59; Referees: Hodžić, Brodić (CRO)
30 July 2026; 16:15	1× (yellow card) 1× (suspension)	Report	7× (suspension)	Pitești Arena, Pitești; Attendance: 59; Referees: Hodžić, Brodić (CRO)

30 July 2026; 18:30	Romania	37–13	Kazakhstan	Pitești Arena, Pitești; Attendance: 389; Referees: Picard, Vauchez (FRA)
30 July 2026; 18:30	Lefter 7	(14–9)	Kopzhan 4	Pitești Arena, Pitești; Attendance: 389; Referees: Picard, Vauchez (FRA)
30 July 2026; 18:30	2× (suspension)	Report	4× (suspension)	Pitești Arena, Pitești; Attendance: 389; Referees: Picard, Vauchez (FRA)

1 August 2026; 16:15	Kazakhstan	26–25	Uruguay	Pitești Arena, Pitești; Attendance: 125; Referees: Martinović, Pavićević (MNE)
1 August 2026; 16:15	Kelimberdi 13	(14–16)	Olmos 6	Pitești Arena, Pitești; Attendance: 125; Referees: Martinović, Pavićević (MNE)
1 August 2026; 16:15	5× (suspension)	Report	1× (yellow card) 1× (suspension)	Pitești Arena, Pitești; Attendance: 125; Referees: Martinović, Pavićević (MNE)

1 August 2026; 18:30	China	31–24	Romania	Pitești Arena, Pitești; Attendance: 720; Referees: Godoy, Magalhães (BRA)
1 August 2026; 18:30	Sun 7	(17–10)	Stoican 6	Pitești Arena, Pitești; Attendance: 720; Referees: Godoy, Magalhães (BRA)
1 August 2026; 18:30	6× (suspension) 1× (red card)	Report	1× (yellow card) 4× (suspension)	Pitești Arena, Pitești; Attendance: 720; Referees: Godoy, Magalhães (BRA)

=== Group G ===
Pos	Team	Pld	W	D	L	GF	GA	GD	Pts	Qualification
1	Slovakia	3	3	0	0	97	66	+31	6	Main round
2	Japan	3	2	0	1	100	78	+22	4	Main round
3	Brazil	3	1	0	2	89	84	+5	2	Presidents Cup
4	Angola	3	0	0	3	51	109	−58	0	Presidents Cup

Source: IHF
Rules for classification: 1) points; 2) head-to-head points; 3) head-to-head goal difference; 4) head-to-head number of goals scored; 5) goal difference.

29 July 2026; 11:45	Slovakia	32–25	Brazil	Traian Sports Hall, Râmnicu Vâlcea; Referees: Pagh, Thygesen (DEN)
29 July 2026; 11:45	Gogová, Karkušová 7	(17–15)	Isab. Olveira, Isad. Olveira 4	Traian Sports Hall, Râmnicu Vâlcea; Referees: Pagh, Thygesen (DEN)
29 July 2026; 11:45	4× (suspension)	Report	5× (suspension)	Traian Sports Hall, Râmnicu Vâlcea; Referees: Pagh, Thygesen (DEN)

29 July 2026; 14:00	Japan	39–19	Angola	Traian Sports Hall, Râmnicu Vâlcea; Attendance: 423; Referees: Watson, Welin (SWE)
29 July 2026; 14:00	four players 6	(19–9)	Kaneculo 6	Traian Sports Hall, Râmnicu Vâlcea; Attendance: 423; Referees: Watson, Welin (SWE)
29 July 2026; 14:00	2× (suspension)	Report	7× (suspension)	Traian Sports Hall, Râmnicu Vâlcea; Attendance: 423; Referees: Watson, Welin (SWE)

30 July 2026; 11:45	Angola	11–33	Slovakia	Traian Sports Hall, Râmnicu Vâlcea; Attendance: 324; Referees: Esmail, Saleh (EGY)
30 July 2026; 11:45	Carlos 3	(4–19)	Nemethová 7	Traian Sports Hall, Râmnicu Vâlcea; Attendance: 324; Referees: Esmail, Saleh (EGY)
30 July 2026; 11:45	4× (suspension)	Report	1× (suspension)	Traian Sports Hall, Râmnicu Vâlcea; Attendance: 324; Referees: Esmail, Saleh (EGY)

30 July 2026; 14:00	Japan	31–27	Brazil	Traian Sports Hall, Râmnicu Vâlcea; Attendance: 378; Referees: Pîrvu, Potîrniche (ROU)
30 July 2026; 14:00	Hamaguchi 11	(15–15)	De Melo, Isab. Olveira 5	Traian Sports Hall, Râmnicu Vâlcea; Attendance: 378; Referees: Pîrvu, Potîrniche (ROU)
30 July 2026; 14:00	1× (suspension)	Report	3× (suspension)	Traian Sports Hall, Râmnicu Vâlcea; Attendance: 378; Referees: Pîrvu, Potîrniche (ROU)

1 August 2026; 11:45	Brazil	37–21	Angola	Traian Sports Hall, Râmnicu Vâlcea; Attendance: 221; Referees: Reyes, Zuñiga (CUB)
1 August 2026; 11:45	Rios 6	(21–7)	four players 4	Traian Sports Hall, Râmnicu Vâlcea; Attendance: 221; Referees: Reyes, Zuñiga (CUB)
1 August 2026; 11:45	1× (yellow card) 1× (suspension)	Report	5× (suspension)	Traian Sports Hall, Râmnicu Vâlcea; Attendance: 221; Referees: Reyes, Zuñiga (CUB)

1 August 2026; 14:00	Slovakia	32–30	Japan	Traian Sports Hall, Râmnicu Vâlcea; Attendance: 232; Referees: Weijmans, Wolbertus (NED)
1 August 2026; 14:00	Bölcskei, Komlós 6	(18–17)	Hamaguchi 9	Traian Sports Hall, Râmnicu Vâlcea; Attendance: 232; Referees: Weijmans, Wolbertus (NED)
1 August 2026; 14:00	2× (suspension)	Report	4× (suspension)	Traian Sports Hall, Râmnicu Vâlcea; Attendance: 232; Referees: Weijmans, Wolbertus (NED)

=== Group H ===
Pos	Team	Pld	W	D	L	GF	GA	GD	Pts	Qualification
1	Switzerland	3	3	0	0	90	63	+27	6	Main round
2	Slovenia	3	2	0	1	85	63	+22	4	Main round
3	Serbia	3	1	0	2	63	79	−16	2	Presidents Cup
4	Algeria	3	0	0	3	54	87	−33	0	Presidents Cup

Source: IHF
Rules for classification: 1) points; 2) head-to-head points; 3) head-to-head goal difference; 4) head-to-head number of goals scored; 5) goal difference.

29 July 2026; 16:15	Switzerland	31–28	Slovenia	Traian Sports Hall, Râmnicu Vâlcea; Attendance: 487; Referees: Esmail, Saleh (EGY)
29 July 2026; 16:15	Mierzwa 14	(17–15)	Vuković 9	Traian Sports Hall, Râmnicu Vâlcea; Attendance: 487; Referees: Esmail, Saleh (EGY)
29 July 2026; 16:15	1× (suspension)	Report	3× (suspension)	Traian Sports Hall, Râmnicu Vâlcea; Attendance: 487; Referees: Esmail, Saleh (EGY)

29 July 2026; 18:30	Serbia	28–22	Algeria	Traian Sports Hall, Râmnicu Vâlcea; Attendance: 532; Referees: Reyes, Zuñiga (CUB)
29 July 2026; 18:30	Andrić 6	(13–13)	three players 4	Traian Sports Hall, Râmnicu Vâlcea; Attendance: 532; Referees: Reyes, Zuñiga (CUB)
29 July 2026; 18:30	3× (suspension)	Report	3× (suspension)	Traian Sports Hall, Râmnicu Vâlcea; Attendance: 532; Referees: Reyes, Zuñiga (CUB)

30 July 2026; 16:15	Algeria	14–28	Switzerland	Traian Sports Hall, Râmnicu Vâlcea; Attendance: 432; Referees: Watson, Welin (SWE)
30 July 2026; 16:15	Bouda, Mansouri 3	(7–13)	Egli 8	Traian Sports Hall, Râmnicu Vâlcea; Attendance: 432; Referees: Watson, Welin (SWE)
30 July 2026; 16:15	5× (suspension)	Report	1× (yellow card) 1× (suspension)	Traian Sports Hall, Râmnicu Vâlcea; Attendance: 432; Referees: Watson, Welin (SWE)

30 July 2026; 18:30	Serbia	14–26	Slovenia	Traian Sports Hall, Râmnicu Vâlcea; Attendance: 453; Referees: Weijmans, Wolbertus (NED)
30 July 2026; 18:30	Andrić, Bajić 3	(7–11)	Mehlin 8	Traian Sports Hall, Râmnicu Vâlcea; Attendance: 453; Referees: Weijmans, Wolbertus (NED)
30 July 2026; 18:30	7× (suspension)	Report	6× (suspension)	Traian Sports Hall, Râmnicu Vâlcea; Attendance: 453; Referees: Weijmans, Wolbertus (NED)

1 August 2026; 16:15	Slovenia	31–18	Algeria	Traian Sports Hall, Râmnicu Vâlcea; Attendance: 324; Referees: Pîrvu, Potîrniche (ROU)
1 August 2026; 16:15	Markežič 5	(16–8)	Sid 8	Traian Sports Hall, Râmnicu Vâlcea; Attendance: 324; Referees: Pîrvu, Potîrniche (ROU)
1 August 2026; 16:15	3× (suspension)	Report	3× (suspension)	Traian Sports Hall, Râmnicu Vâlcea; Attendance: 324; Referees: Pîrvu, Potîrniche (ROU)

1 August 2026; 18:30	Switzerland	31–21	Serbia	Traian Sports Hall, Râmnicu Vâlcea; Attendance: 377; Referees: Pagh, Thygesen (DEN)
1 August 2026; 18:30	Mierzwa 10	(13–11)	Bajić, Mirković 4	Traian Sports Hall, Râmnicu Vâlcea; Attendance: 377; Referees: Pagh, Thygesen (DEN)
1 August 2026; 18:30	2× (suspension)	Report	8× (suspension)	Traian Sports Hall, Râmnicu Vâlcea; Attendance: 377; Referees: Pagh, Thygesen (DEN)

== President's Cup ==
Points obtained in the matches against the team from the group are taken over.

=== Group I ===
Pos	Team	Pld	W	D	L	GF	GA	GD	Pts	Qualification
1	Croatia	3	3	0	0	139	45	+94	6	17–20th place semifinals
2	Czech Republic	3	2	0	1	124	56	+68	4	21st–24th place semifinals
3	Mexico	3	1	0	2	72	92	−20	2	25–28th place semifinals
4	Fiji	3	0	0	3	22	164	−142	0	29th–32nd place semifinals

Source: IHF
Rules for classification: 1) points; 2) head-to-head points; 3) head-to-head goal difference; 4) head-to-head number of goals scored; 5) goal difference.

3 August 2026; 16:15	Croatia	38–17	Mexico	Polyvalent Hall, Craiova; Attendance: 105; Referees: Furukawa, Murata (JPN)
3 August 2026; 16:15	Jurlina 6	(19–8)	three players 3	Polyvalent Hall, Craiova; Attendance: 105; Referees: Furukawa, Murata (JPN)
3 August 2026; 16:15		Report	4× (suspension)	Polyvalent Hall, Craiova; Attendance: 105; Referees: Furukawa, Murata (JPN)

3 August 2026; 18:30	Czech Republic	58–6	Fiji	Polyvalent Hall, Craiova; Attendance: 100; Referees: Esmail, Saleh (EGY)
3 August 2026; 18:30	Janků 11	(27–3)	Vuniwai 4	Polyvalent Hall, Craiova; Attendance: 100; Referees: Esmail, Saleh (EGY)
3 August 2026; 18:30		Report	3× (suspension)	Polyvalent Hall, Craiova; Attendance: 100; Referees: Esmail, Saleh (EGY)

4 August 2026; 16:15	Croatia	34–24	Czech Republic	Polyvalent Hall, Craiova; Attendance: 110; Referees: Borge, Nygren (NOR)
4 August 2026; 16:15	Košćec 8	(20–16)	Máčalová 5	Polyvalent Hall, Craiova; Attendance: 110; Referees: Borge, Nygren (NOR)
4 August 2026; 16:15	1× (yellow card) 1× (suspension)	Report	2× (suspension)	Polyvalent Hall, Craiova; Attendance: 110; Referees: Borge, Nygren (NOR)

4 August 2026; 18:30	Fiji	12–39	Mexico	Polyvalent Hall, Craiova; Attendance: 45; Referees: Hellbusch, Jansen (GER)
4 August 2026; 18:30	Matakarawa, Raogo 3	(9–23)	Sánchez 7	Polyvalent Hall, Craiova; Attendance: 45; Referees: Hellbusch, Jansen (GER)
4 August 2026; 18:30	2× (suspension)	Report		Polyvalent Hall, Craiova; Attendance: 45; Referees: Hellbusch, Jansen (GER)

=== Group II ===
Pos	Team	Pld	W	D	L	GF	GA	GD	Pts	Qualification
1	Portugal	3	3	0	0	100	64	+36	6	17–20th place semifinals
2	Argentina	3	2	0	1	80	79	+1	4	21st–24th place semifinals
3	Guinea	3	0	1	2	66	74	−8	1 (Note: Guinea 22–22 Uzbekistan)	25–28th place semifinals
4	Uzbekistan	3	0	1	2	69	98	−29	1	29th–32nd place semifinals

Source: IHF
Rules for classification: 1) points; 2) head-to-head points; 3) head-to-head goal difference; 4) head-to-head number of goals scored; 5) goal difference.
Notes:

3 August 2026; 16:15	Guinea	21–24	Argentina	Traian Sports Hall, Râmnicu Vâlcea; Attendance: 311; Referees: Hodžić, Brodić (CRO)
3 August 2026; 16:15	Diallo 8	(10–15)	Podesta 7	Traian Sports Hall, Râmnicu Vâlcea; Attendance: 311; Referees: Hodžić, Brodić (CRO)
3 August 2026; 16:15	4× (suspension) 2× (red card)	Report	3× (suspension)	Traian Sports Hall, Râmnicu Vâlcea; Attendance: 311; Referees: Hodžić, Brodić (CRO)

3 August 2026; 18:30	Portugal	38–23	Uzbekistan	Traian Sports Hall, Râmnicu Vâlcea; Attendance: 378; Referees: Watson, Welin (SWE)
3 August 2026; 18:30	Bernardino 12	(19–14)	Keldiyorova 8	Traian Sports Hall, Râmnicu Vâlcea; Attendance: 378; Referees: Watson, Welin (SWE)
3 August 2026; 18:30	2× (suspension)	Report	3× (suspension)	Traian Sports Hall, Râmnicu Vâlcea; Attendance: 378; Referees: Watson, Welin (SWE)

4 August 2026; 16:15	Guinea	23–28	Portugal	Traian Sports Hall, Râmnicu Vâlcea; Attendance: 224; Referees: Chiruță, Murariu (ROU)
4 August 2026; 16:15	Diallo 8	(11–20)	Lopes 9	Traian Sports Hall, Râmnicu Vâlcea; Attendance: 224; Referees: Chiruță, Murariu (ROU)
4 August 2026; 16:15		Report	2× (suspension)	Traian Sports Hall, Râmnicu Vâlcea; Attendance: 224; Referees: Chiruță, Murariu (ROU)

4 August 2026; 18:30	Uzbekistan	24–38	Argentina	Traian Sports Hall, Râmnicu Vâlcea; Attendance: 267; Referees: Martinović, Pavićević (MNE)
4 August 2026; 18:30	Keldiyorova 6	(11–21)	Cabrera 7	Traian Sports Hall, Râmnicu Vâlcea; Attendance: 267; Referees: Martinović, Pavićević (MNE)
4 August 2026; 18:30	2× (suspension)	Report	1× (suspension)	Traian Sports Hall, Râmnicu Vâlcea; Attendance: 267; Referees: Martinović, Pavićević (MNE)

=== Group III ===
Pos	Team	Pld	W	D	L	GF	GA	GD	Pts	Qualification
1	Tunisia	3	3	0	0	84	61	+23	6	17–20th place semifinals
2	Kazakhstan	3	2	0	1	79	80	−1	4	21st–24th place semifinals
3	Canada	3	1	0	2	64	79	−15	2	25–28th place semifinals
4	Uruguay	3	0	0	3	64	71	−7	0	29th–32nd place semifinals

Source: IHF
Rules for classification: 1) points; 2) head-to-head points; 3) head-to-head goal difference; 4) head-to-head number of goals scored; 5) goal difference.

3 August 2026; 11:45	Tunisia	23–19	Uruguay	Polyvalent Hall, Craiova; Attendance: 125; Referees: Borge, Nygren (NOR)
3 August 2026; 11:45	Rebai 4	(11–10)	Olmos 7	Polyvalent Hall, Craiova; Attendance: 125; Referees: Borge, Nygren (NOR)
3 August 2026; 11:45	1× (yellow card) 5× (suspension) 1× (red card)	Report	6× (suspension)	Polyvalent Hall, Craiova; Attendance: 125; Referees: Borge, Nygren (NOR)

3 August 2026; 14:00	Kazakhstan	27–26	Canada	Polyvalent Hall, Craiova; Attendance: 115; Referees: Pagh, Thygesen (DEN)
3 August 2026; 14:00	Kyrgyzbay 10	(15–13)	Morisette-Davies 9	Polyvalent Hall, Craiova; Attendance: 115; Referees: Pagh, Thygesen (DEN)
3 August 2026; 14:00	3× (suspension)	Report	2× (suspension)	Polyvalent Hall, Craiova; Attendance: 115; Referees: Pagh, Thygesen (DEN)

4 August 2026; 11:45	Tunisia	29–26	Kazakhstan	Polyvalent Hall, Craiova; Attendance: 60; Referees: Furukawa, Murata (JPN)
4 August 2026; 11:45	Ouni 13	(16–11)	Kyrgyzbay 7	Polyvalent Hall, Craiova; Attendance: 60; Referees: Furukawa, Murata (JPN)
4 August 2026; 11:45	3× (suspension)	Report	1× (suspension)	Polyvalent Hall, Craiova; Attendance: 60; Referees: Furukawa, Murata (JPN)

4 August 2026; 14:00	Canada	22–20	Uruguay	Polyvalent Hall, Craiova; Attendance: 120; Referees: Al-Shahi, Al-Wahibi (OMA)
4 August 2026; 14:00	Morisette-Davies 6	(12–11)	Olmos 5	Polyvalent Hall, Craiova; Attendance: 120; Referees: Al-Shahi, Al-Wahibi (OMA)
4 August 2026; 14:00	2× (suspension)	Report	2× (suspension)	Polyvalent Hall, Craiova; Attendance: 120; Referees: Al-Shahi, Al-Wahibi (OMA)

=== Group IV ===
Pos	Team	Pld	W	D	L	GF	GA	GD	Pts	Qualification
1	Brazil	3	3	0	0	106	64	+42	6	17–20th place semifinals
2	Serbia	3	2	0	1	81	76	+5	4	21st–24th place semifinals
3	Angola	3	1	0	2	78	88	−10	2	25–28th place semifinals
4	Algeria	3	0	0	3	63	100	−37	0	29th–32nd place semifinals

Source: IHF
Rules for classification: 1) points; 2) head-to-head points; 3) head-to-head goal difference; 4) head-to-head number of goals scored; 5) goal difference.

3 August 2026; 11:45	Brazil	41–23	Algeria	Traian Sports Hall, Râmnicu Vâlcea; Attendance: 187; Referees: Martinović, Pavićević (MNE)
3 August 2026; 11:45	Monteiro 10	(22–9)	Halou 7	Traian Sports Hall, Râmnicu Vâlcea; Attendance: 187; Referees: Martinović, Pavićević (MNE)
3 August 2026; 11:45	2× (suspension)	Report	4× (suspension)	Traian Sports Hall, Râmnicu Vâlcea; Attendance: 187; Referees: Martinović, Pavićević (MNE)

3 August 2026; 14:00	Serbia	33–26	Angola	Traian Sports Hall, Râmnicu Vâlcea; Attendance: 265; Referees: Chiruță, Murariu (ROU)
3 August 2026; 14:00	Radanović 7	(14–13)	Ambrosio 7	Traian Sports Hall, Râmnicu Vâlcea; Attendance: 265; Referees: Chiruță, Murariu (ROU)
3 August 2026; 14:00	1× (suspension)	Report	3× (suspension)	Traian Sports Hall, Râmnicu Vâlcea; Attendance: 265; Referees: Chiruță, Murariu (ROU)

4 August 2026; 11:45	Brazil	28–20	Serbia	Traian Sports Hall, Râmnicu Vâlcea; Attendance: 156; Referees: Reyes, Zuñiga (CUB)
4 August 2026; 11:45	Rios 5	(14–6)	Andrić, Damnjanović 4	Traian Sports Hall, Râmnicu Vâlcea; Attendance: 156; Referees: Reyes, Zuñiga (CUB)
4 August 2026; 11:45	2× (suspension)	Report	3× (suspension)	Traian Sports Hall, Râmnicu Vâlcea; Attendance: 156; Referees: Reyes, Zuñiga (CUB)

4 August 2026; 14:00	Angola	31–18	Algeria	Traian Sports Hall, Râmnicu Vâlcea; Attendance: 219; Referees: Hodžić, Brodić (CRO)
4 August 2026; 14:00	Kaneculo 6	(13–10)	Bouda 5	Traian Sports Hall, Râmnicu Vâlcea; Attendance: 219; Referees: Hodžić, Brodić (CRO)
4 August 2026; 14:00	2× (suspension)	Report		Traian Sports Hall, Râmnicu Vâlcea; Attendance: 219; Referees: Hodžić, Brodić (CRO)

== Main round ==
Points obtained in the matches against the team from the group are taken over.

=== Group I ===
Pos	Team	Pld	W	D	L	GF	GA	GD	Pts	Qualification
1	Egypt	3	3	0	0	80	73	+7	6	Quarterfinals
2	Denmark	3	2	0	1	76	74	+2	4	Quarterfinals
3	France	3	1	0	2	66	68	−2	2	9–12th place semifinals
4	South Korea	3	0	0	3	77	84	−7	0	13–16th place semifinals

Source: IHF
Rules for classification: 1) points; 2) head-to-head points; 3) head-to-head goal difference; 4) head-to-head number of goals scored; 5) goal difference.

3 August 2026; 11:45	Egypt	28–27	South Korea	Pitești Arena, Pitești; Attendance: 76; Referees: Weijmans, Wolbertus (NED)
3 August 2026; 11:45	El-Badry 6	(13–13)	Kim E. 7	Pitești Arena, Pitești; Attendance: 76; Referees: Weijmans, Wolbertus (NED)
3 August 2026; 11:45	1× (yellow card) 5× (suspension)	Report	3× (suspension)	Pitești Arena, Pitești; Attendance: 76; Referees: Weijmans, Wolbertus (NED)

3 August 2026; 14:00	Denmark	21–19	France	Pitești Arena, Pitești; Attendance: 74; Referees: Hellbusch, Jansen (GER)
3 August 2026; 14:00	Hansen 5	(13–7)	Buisson 4	Pitești Arena, Pitești; Attendance: 74; Referees: Hellbusch, Jansen (GER)
3 August 2026; 14:00	4× (suspension)	Report	3× (suspension)	Pitești Arena, Pitești; Attendance: 74; Referees: Hellbusch, Jansen (GER)

4 August 2026; 11:45	Egypt	23–22	Denmark	Pitești Arena, Pitești; Attendance: 68; Referees: Pukšič, Satler (SLO)
4 August 2026; 11:45	Aboyoussef 8	(11–11)	Spellerberg 8	Pitești Arena, Pitești; Attendance: 68; Referees: Pukšič, Satler (SLO)
4 August 2026; 11:45	2× (suspension)	Report	2× (suspension)	Pitești Arena, Pitești; Attendance: 68; Referees: Pukšič, Satler (SLO)

4 August 2026; 14:00	France	23–18	South Korea	Pitești Arena, Pitești; Attendance: 85; Referees: Pagh, Thygesen (DEN)
4 August 2026; 14:00	Buisson 11	(6–9)	Lee J. 5	Pitești Arena, Pitești; Attendance: 85; Referees: Pagh, Thygesen (DEN)
4 August 2026; 14:00	1× (suspension)	Report	1× (suspension)	Pitești Arena, Pitești; Attendance: 85; Referees: Pagh, Thygesen (DEN)

=== Group II ===
Pos	Team	Pld	W	D	L	GF	GA	GD	Pts	Qualification
1	Spain	3	3	0	0	92	83	+9	6	Quarterfinals
2	Montenegro	3	2	0	1	87	87	0	4	Quarterfinals
3	Netherlands	3	1	0	2	81	83	−2	2	9–12th place semifinals
4	Germany	3	0	0	3	76	83	−7	0	13–16th place semifinals

Source: IHF
Rules for classification: 1) points; 2) head-to-head points; 3) head-to-head goal difference; 4) head-to-head number of goals scored; 5) goal difference.

3 August 2026; 16:15	Spain	30–26	Netherlands	Sala Sporturilor, Mioveni; Attendance: 142; Referees: Godoy, Magalhães (BRA)
3 August 2026; 16:15	Calleja 10	(13–14)	Kwakman 6	Sala Sporturilor, Mioveni; Attendance: 142; Referees: Godoy, Magalhães (BRA)
3 August 2026; 16:15		Report	3× (suspension)	Sala Sporturilor, Mioveni; Attendance: 142; Referees: Godoy, Magalhães (BRA)

3 August 2026; 18:30	Montenegro	27–26	Germany	Sala Sporturilor, Mioveni; Attendance: 142; Referees: Pîrvu, Potîrniche (ROU)
3 August 2026; 18:30	Dragnić, Savić 5	(16–11)	Külker, Overbeck 5	Sala Sporturilor, Mioveni; Attendance: 142; Referees: Pîrvu, Potîrniche (ROU)
3 August 2026; 18:30	1× (yellow card) 5× (suspension)	Report	1× (yellow card) 2× (suspension)	Sala Sporturilor, Mioveni; Attendance: 142; Referees: Pîrvu, Potîrniche (ROU)

4 August 2026; 16:15	Spain	35–33	Montenegro	Sala Sporturilor, Mioveni; Attendance: 105; Referees: Picard, Vauchez (FRA)
4 August 2026; 16:15	Berroeta, Fresco 7	(17–17)	Dragnić 7	Sala Sporturilor, Mioveni; Attendance: 105; Referees: Picard, Vauchez (FRA)
4 August 2026; 16:15	3× (suspension)	Report	7× (suspension)	Sala Sporturilor, Mioveni; Attendance: 105; Referees: Picard, Vauchez (FRA)

4 August 2026; 18:30	Germany	26–29	Netherlands	Sala Sporturilor, Mioveni; Attendance: 83; Referees: Haggui, Haggui (TUN)
4 August 2026; 18:30	Overbeck 9	(14–19)	Kwakman 8	Sala Sporturilor, Mioveni; Attendance: 83; Referees: Haggui, Haggui (TUN)
4 August 2026; 18:30	3× (suspension)	Report	3× (suspension)	Sala Sporturilor, Mioveni; Attendance: 83; Referees: Haggui, Haggui (TUN)

=== Group III ===
Pos	Team	Pld	W	D	L	GF	GA	GD	Pts	Qualification
1	Hungary	3	2	1	0	100	89	+11	5	Quarterfinals
2	China	3	2	0	1	101	96	+5	4	Quarterfinals
3	Romania (H)	3	1	1	1	78	79	−1	3	9–12th place semifinals
4	Sweden	3	0	0	3	84	99	−15	0	13–16th place semifinals

Source: IHF
Rules for classification: 1) points; 2) head-to-head points; 3) head-to-head goal difference; 4) head-to-head number of goals scored; 5) goal difference.
(H) Hosts

3 August 2026; 16:15	China	34–31	Sweden	Pitești Arena, Pitești; Attendance: 280; Referees: Haggui, Haggui (TUN)
3 August 2026; 16:15	Zhang S. 13	(17–17)	Schmidinger 8	Pitești Arena, Pitești; Attendance: 280; Referees: Haggui, Haggui (TUN)
3 August 2026; 16:15	2× (suspension)	Report	3× (suspension)	Pitești Arena, Pitești; Attendance: 280; Referees: Haggui, Haggui (TUN)

3 August 2026; 18:30	Hungary	24–24	Romania	Pitești Arena, Pitești; Attendance: 745; Referees: Correa (ARG), Araújo ( URU)
3 August 2026; 18:30	Litschauer 6	(16–15)	three players 4	Pitești Arena, Pitești; Attendance: 745; Referees: Correa (ARG), Araújo ( URU)
3 August 2026; 18:30	1× (yellow card) 5× (suspension)	Report	2× (yellow card) 8× (suspension) 1× (red card)	Pitești Arena, Pitești; Attendance: 745; Referees: Correa (ARG), Araújo ( URU)

4 August 2026; 16:15	Hungary	41–36	China	Pitești Arena, Pitești; Attendance: 279; Referees: Fotakidis, Kinatzidis (GRE)
4 August 2026; 16:15	Szigeti 8	(21–20)	Zhang S. 9	Pitești Arena, Pitești; Attendance: 279; Referees: Fotakidis, Kinatzidis (GRE)
4 August 2026; 16:15	1× (suspension)	Report	6× (suspension)	Pitești Arena, Pitești; Attendance: 279; Referees: Fotakidis, Kinatzidis (GRE)

4 August 2026; 18:30	Sweden	24–30	Romania	Pitești Arena, Pitești; Attendance: 725; Referees: Weijmans, Wolbertus (NED)
4 August 2026; 18:30	Ström 8	(14–17)	three players 4	Pitești Arena, Pitești; Attendance: 725; Referees: Weijmans, Wolbertus (NED)
4 August 2026; 18:30	1× (yellow card) 4× (suspension)	Report	2× (suspension)	Pitești Arena, Pitești; Attendance: 725; Referees: Weijmans, Wolbertus (NED)

=== Group IV ===
Pos	Team	Pld	W	D	L	GF	GA	GD	Pts	Qualification
1	Slovakia	3	2	0	1	87	81	+6	4 (Note: Slovakia 32–27 Switzerland)	Quarterfinals
2	Switzerland	3	2	0	1	99	91	+8	4	Quarterfinals
3	Japan	3	1	0	2	95	103	−8	2 (Note: Japan 34–30 Slovenia)	9–12th place semifinals
4	Slovenia	3	1	0	2	82	88	−6	2	13–16th place semifinals

Source: IHF
Rules for classification: 1) points; 2) head-to-head points; 3) head-to-head goal difference; 4) head-to-head number of goals scored; 5) goal difference.
Notes:

3 August 2026; 11:45	Slovakia	23–24	Slovenia	Sala Sporturilor, Mioveni; Attendance: 135; Referees: Dáné, Marton (HUN)
3 August 2026; 11:45	Gogová 5	(11–14)	Štukelj 8	Sala Sporturilor, Mioveni; Attendance: 135; Referees: Dáné, Marton (HUN)
3 August 2026; 11:45	2× (yellow card) 4× (suspension)	Report	4× (suspension)	Sala Sporturilor, Mioveni; Attendance: 135; Referees: Dáné, Marton (HUN)

3 August 2026; 14:00	Switzerland	41–31	Japan	Sala Sporturilor, Mioveni; Attendance: 137; Referees: Al-Enezi, Al-Naseem (KUW)
3 August 2026; 14:00	Hofstetter 8	(15–15)	Miura 12	Sala Sporturilor, Mioveni; Attendance: 137; Referees: Al-Enezi, Al-Naseem (KUW)
3 August 2026; 14:00	1× (yellow card) 4× (suspension)	Report	2× (suspension)	Sala Sporturilor, Mioveni; Attendance: 137; Referees: Al-Enezi, Al-Naseem (KUW)

4 August 2026; 11:45	Slovakia	32–27	Switzerland	Sala Sporturilor, Mioveni; Attendance: 97; Referees: Bozhinovski, Nachevski (MKD)
4 August 2026; 11:45	Gogová 9	(18–14)	Mierzwa 14	Sala Sporturilor, Mioveni; Attendance: 97; Referees: Bozhinovski, Nachevski (MKD)
4 August 2026; 11:45	2× (suspension)	Report	1× (suspension)	Sala Sporturilor, Mioveni; Attendance: 97; Referees: Bozhinovski, Nachevski (MKD)

4 August 2026; 14:00	Japan	34–30	Slovenia	Sala Sporturilor, Mioveni; Attendance: 112; Referees: Correa (ARG), Araújo ( URU)
4 August 2026; 14:00	Nakasuji 9	(19–13)	Štukelj 9	Sala Sporturilor, Mioveni; Attendance: 112; Referees: Correa (ARG), Araújo ( URU)
4 August 2026; 14:00	5× (suspension)	Report	3× (suspension)	Sala Sporturilor, Mioveni; Attendance: 112; Referees: Correa (ARG), Araújo ( URU)

== Placement matches ==
=== 29th place bracket ===
29–32nd place semifinals
6 August
Fiji	9
Uruguay	55
6 August
Uzbekistan	38
Algeria	30

29th place game
7 August
Uruguay	33
Uzbekistan	27
31st place game
7 August
Fiji	17
Algeria	52

==== 29th–32nd place semifinals ====
6 August 2026; 11:45	Fiji	9–55	Uruguay	Polyvalent Hall, Craiova; Attendance: 70; Referees: Al-Shahi, Al-Wahibi (OMA)
6 August 2026; 11:45	Matakarawa 3	(5–22)	Marti 11	Polyvalent Hall, Craiova; Attendance: 70; Referees: Al-Shahi, Al-Wahibi (OMA)
6 August 2026; 11:45	1× (suspension)	Report	1× (suspension)	Polyvalent Hall, Craiova; Attendance: 70; Referees: Al-Shahi, Al-Wahibi (OMA)

6 August 2026; 14:00	Uzbekistan	38–30	Algeria	Polyvalent Hall, Craiova; Attendance: 60; Referees: Godoy, Magalhães (BRA)
6 August 2026; 14:00	Bayjanova 10	(19–19)	Lahlah 10	Polyvalent Hall, Craiova; Attendance: 60; Referees: Godoy, Magalhães (BRA)
6 August 2026; 14:00	4× (suspension)	Report	4× (suspension) 1× (red card)	Polyvalent Hall, Craiova; Attendance: 60; Referees: Godoy, Magalhães (BRA)

==== 31st place game ====
7 August 2026; 11:45	Fiji	17–52	Algeria	Polyvalent Hall, Craiova; Attendance: 40; Referees: Furukawa, Murata (JPN)
7 August 2026; 11:45	A. Logavatu 5	(7–25)	Salmi 9	Polyvalent Hall, Craiova; Attendance: 40; Referees: Furukawa, Murata (JPN)
7 August 2026; 11:45	8× (suspension)	Report	2× (suspension)	Polyvalent Hall, Craiova; Attendance: 40; Referees: Furukawa, Murata (JPN)

==== 29th place game ====
7 August 2026; 14:00	Uruguay	33–27	Uzbekistan	Polyvalent Hall, Craiova; Attendance: 50; Referees: Borge, Nygren (NOR)
7 August 2026; 14:00	Villar 10	(12–13)	Em 10	Polyvalent Hall, Craiova; Attendance: 50; Referees: Borge, Nygren (NOR)
7 August 2026; 14:00	1× (yellow card) 5× (suspension) 1× (red card)	Report	3× (suspension)	Polyvalent Hall, Craiova; Attendance: 50; Referees: Borge, Nygren (NOR)

=== 25th place bracket ===
25–28th place semifinals
6 August
Mexico	16
Canada	19
6 August
Guinea	24
Angola	19

25th place game
7 August
Canada	15
Guinea	33
27th place game
7 August
Mexico	25
Angola	32

==== 25–28th place semifinals ====
6 August 2026; 16:15	Mexico	16–19	Canada	Polyvalent Hall, Craiova; Attendance: 50; Referees: Esmail, Saleh (EGY)
6 August 2026; 16:15	Muñoz, Silva 4	(11–7)	Allard, Desilets 4	Polyvalent Hall, Craiova; Attendance: 50; Referees: Esmail, Saleh (EGY)
6 August 2026; 16:15	5× (suspension)	Report	1× (suspension)	Polyvalent Hall, Craiova; Attendance: 50; Referees: Esmail, Saleh (EGY)

6 August 2026; 18:30	Guinea	24–19	Angola	Polyvalent Hall, Craiova; Attendance: 40; Referees: Furukawa, Murata (JPN)
6 August 2026; 18:30	Diallo 8	(14–10)	Ambrosio, Garcia 4	Polyvalent Hall, Craiova; Attendance: 40; Referees: Furukawa, Murata (JPN)
6 August 2026; 18:30	3× (suspension)	Report	3× (suspension)	Polyvalent Hall, Craiova; Attendance: 40; Referees: Furukawa, Murata (JPN)

==== 27th place game ====
7 August 2026; 16:15	Mexico	25–32	Angola	Polyvalent Hall, Craiova; Attendance: 45; Referees: Al-Shahi, Al-Wahibi (OMA)
7 August 2026; 16:15	Muñoz 8	(10–19)	Kaneculo 13	Polyvalent Hall, Craiova; Attendance: 45; Referees: Al-Shahi, Al-Wahibi (OMA)
7 August 2026; 16:15	2× (suspension)	Report		Polyvalent Hall, Craiova; Attendance: 45; Referees: Al-Shahi, Al-Wahibi (OMA)

==== 25th place game ====
7 August 2026; 18:30	Canada	15–33	Guinea	Polyvalent Hall, Craiova; Attendance: 55; Referees: Godoy, Magalhães (BRA)
7 August 2026; 18:30	Morisette-Davies 6	(7–16)	Soumah 9	Polyvalent Hall, Craiova; Attendance: 55; Referees: Godoy, Magalhães (BRA)
7 August 2026; 18:30	2× (suspension)	Report	4× (suspension)	Polyvalent Hall, Craiova; Attendance: 55; Referees: Godoy, Magalhães (BRA)

=== 21st place bracket ===
21st–24th place semifinals
6 August
Czech Republic	41
Kazakhstan	22
6 August
Argentina	23
Serbia	24

21st place game
7 August
Czech Republic	31
Serbia	23
23rd place game
7 August
Kazakhstan	18
Argentina	32

==== 21st–24th place semifinals ====
6 August 2026; 11:45	Czech Republic	41–22	Kazakhstan	Traian Sports Hall, Râmnicu Vâlcea; Attendance: 287; Referees: Reyes, Zuñiga (CUB)
6 August 2026; 11:45	Máčalová 7	(18–10)	Kopzhan 8	Traian Sports Hall, Râmnicu Vâlcea; Attendance: 287; Referees: Reyes, Zuñiga (CUB)
6 August 2026; 11:45	2× (suspension)	Report	2× (suspension)	Traian Sports Hall, Râmnicu Vâlcea; Attendance: 287; Referees: Reyes, Zuñiga (CUB)

6 August 2026; 14:00	Argentina	23–24	Serbia	Traian Sports Hall, Râmnicu Vâlcea; Attendance: 314; Referees: Pîrvu, Potîrniche (ROU)
6 August 2026; 14:00	Podesta 8	(11–16)	Mirković 8	Traian Sports Hall, Râmnicu Vâlcea; Attendance: 314; Referees: Pîrvu, Potîrniche (ROU)
6 August 2026; 14:00	2× (yellow card) 6× (suspension)	Report	4× (suspension)	Traian Sports Hall, Râmnicu Vâlcea; Attendance: 314; Referees: Pîrvu, Potîrniche (ROU)

==== 23rd place game ====
7 August 2026; 11:45	Kazakhstan	18–32	Argentina	Traian Sports Hall, Râmnicu Vâlcea; Referees: Watson, Welin (SWE)
7 August 2026; 11:45	Kyrgyzbay, Popova 4	(10–16)	Pangaro, Podesta 5	Traian Sports Hall, Râmnicu Vâlcea; Referees: Watson, Welin (SWE)
7 August 2026; 11:45	2× (suspension)	Report	2× (suspension)	Traian Sports Hall, Râmnicu Vâlcea; Referees: Watson, Welin (SWE)

==== 21st place game ====
7 August 2026; 14:00	Czech Republic	31–23	Serbia	Traian Sports Hall, Râmnicu Vâlcea; Attendance: 234; Referees: Pîrvu, Potîrniche (ROU)
7 August 2026; 14:00	Königová 9	(14–12)	three players 4	Traian Sports Hall, Râmnicu Vâlcea; Attendance: 234; Referees: Pîrvu, Potîrniche (ROU)
7 August 2026; 14:00	3× (suspension)	Report	3× (suspension)	Traian Sports Hall, Râmnicu Vâlcea; Attendance: 234; Referees: Pîrvu, Potîrniche (ROU)

=== 17th place bracket ===
17–20th place semifinals
6 August
Croatia	33
Tunisia	32
6 August
Portugal	31
Brazil	22

17th place game
7 August
Croatia	26
Portugal	34
19th place game
7 August
Tunisia	29
Brazil	31

==== 17–20th place semifinals ====
6 August 2026; 16:15	Croatia	33–23	Tunisia	Traian Sports Hall, Râmnicu Vâlcea; Attendance: 268; Referees: Fotakidis, Kinatzidis (GRE)
6 August 2026; 16:15	Jerković 7	(18–12)	Ouni 9	Traian Sports Hall, Râmnicu Vâlcea; Attendance: 268; Referees: Fotakidis, Kinatzidis (GRE)
6 August 2026; 16:15	7× (suspension)	Report	7× (suspension) 1× (red card)	Traian Sports Hall, Râmnicu Vâlcea; Attendance: 268; Referees: Fotakidis, Kinatzidis (GRE)

6 August 2026; 18:30	Portugal	31–22	Brazil	Traian Sports Hall, Râmnicu Vâlcea; Attendance: 367; Referees: Watson, Welin (SWE)
6 August 2026; 18:30	Bernardino 7	(17–6)	De Almeida 5	Traian Sports Hall, Râmnicu Vâlcea; Attendance: 367; Referees: Watson, Welin (SWE)
6 August 2026; 18:30	2× (suspension)	Report		Traian Sports Hall, Râmnicu Vâlcea; Attendance: 367; Referees: Watson, Welin (SWE)

==== 19th place game ====
7 August 2026; 16:15	Tunisia	29–31	Brazil	Traian Sports Hall, Râmnicu Vâlcea; Attendance: 313; Referees: Reyes, Zuñiga (CUB)
7 August 2026; 16:15	Ouni 6	(16–13)	Campos, De Almeida 6	Traian Sports Hall, Râmnicu Vâlcea; Attendance: 313; Referees: Reyes, Zuñiga (CUB)
7 August 2026; 16:15	3× (suspension)	Report	2× (suspension)	Traian Sports Hall, Râmnicu Vâlcea; Attendance: 313; Referees: Reyes, Zuñiga (CUB)

==== 17th place game ====
7 August 2026; 18:30	Croatia	26–34	Portugal	Traian Sports Hall, Râmnicu Vâlcea; Attendance: 376; Referees: Al-Enezi, Al-Naseem (KUW)
7 August 2026; 18:30	Jurić 7	(13–18)	Lopes 9	Traian Sports Hall, Râmnicu Vâlcea; Attendance: 376; Referees: Al-Enezi, Al-Naseem (KUW)
7 August 2026; 18:30	1× (yellow card) 3× (suspension)	Report	1× (yellow card) 3× (suspension)	Traian Sports Hall, Râmnicu Vâlcea; Attendance: 376; Referees: Al-Enezi, Al-Naseem (KUW)

=== 13–16th place bracket ===
13–16th place semifinals
6 August
South Korea	29
Sweden	25
6 August
Germany	33
Slovenia	24

13th place game
7 August
South Korea	26
Germany	34
15th place game
7 August
Sweden	26
Slovenia	25

==== 13–16th place semifinals ====
6 August 2026; 11:30	South Korea	29–25	Sweden	Pitești Arena, Pitești; Attendance: 55; Referees: Martinović, Pavićević (MNE)
6 August 2026; 11:30	Cho M. 5	(14–14)	Koch 5	Pitești Arena, Pitești; Attendance: 55; Referees: Martinović, Pavićević (MNE)
6 August 2026; 11:30	2× (suspension)	Report	1× (yellow card) 4× (suspension)	Pitești Arena, Pitești; Attendance: 55; Referees: Martinović, Pavićević (MNE)

6 August 2026; 11:30	Germany	33–24	Slovenia	Sala Sporturilor, Mioveni; Attendance: 61; Referees: Chiruță, Murariu (ROU)
6 August 2026; 11:30	Külker, Rusko 6	(17–12)	Markežič, Štukelj 5	Sala Sporturilor, Mioveni; Attendance: 61; Referees: Chiruță, Murariu (ROU)
6 August 2026; 11:30	1× (yellow card) 5× (suspension)	Report	3× (suspension)	Sala Sporturilor, Mioveni; Attendance: 61; Referees: Chiruță, Murariu (ROU)

==== 15th place game ====
7 August 2026; 11:45	Sweden	26–25	Slovenia	Sala Sporturilor, Mioveni; Attendance: 59; Referees: Correa (ARG), Araújo ( URU)
7 August 2026; 11:45	five players 3	(13–18)	Štukelj 10	Sala Sporturilor, Mioveni; Attendance: 59; Referees: Correa (ARG), Araújo ( URU)
7 August 2026; 11:45	1× (yellow card) 6× (suspension)	Report	3× (suspension)	Sala Sporturilor, Mioveni; Attendance: 59; Referees: Correa (ARG), Araújo ( URU)

==== 13th place game ====
7 August 2026; 11:45	South Korea	26–34	Germany	Pitești Arena, Pitești; Attendance: 49; Referees: Pagh, Thygesen (DEN)
7 August 2026; 11:45	Cho E. 5	(16–20)	Rusko 7	Pitești Arena, Pitești; Attendance: 49; Referees: Pagh, Thygesen (DEN)
7 August 2026; 11:45	2× (suspension)	Report	3× (suspension)	Pitești Arena, Pitești; Attendance: 49; Referees: Pagh, Thygesen (DEN)

=== 9–12th place bracket ===
9–12th place semifinals
6 August
France	32
Romania	21
6 August
Netherlands	36
Japan	47

Ninth place game
7 August
France	31
Japan	38
Eleventh place game
7 August
Romania	27
Netherlands	33

==== 9–12th place semifinals ====
6 August 2026; 13:45	France	32–21	Romania	Pitești Arena, Pitești; Attendance: 130; Referees: Pukšič, Satler (SLO)
6 August 2026; 13:45	Saramito 10	(17–11)	Stoican 4	Pitești Arena, Pitești; Attendance: 130; Referees: Pukšič, Satler (SLO)
6 August 2026; 13:45	2× (suspension)	Report	5× (suspension)	Pitești Arena, Pitești; Attendance: 130; Referees: Pukšič, Satler (SLO)

6 August 2026; 13:45	Netherlands	36–47	Japan	Sala Sporturilor, Mioveni; Attendance: 87; Referees: Dáné, Marton (HUN)
6 August 2026; 13:45	Kwakman 8	(17–20)	Miura 16	Sala Sporturilor, Mioveni; Attendance: 87; Referees: Dáné, Marton (HUN)
6 August 2026; 13:45	4× (suspension)	Report	1× (suspension)	Sala Sporturilor, Mioveni; Attendance: 87; Referees: Dáné, Marton (HUN)

==== Eleventh place game ====
7 August 2026; 14:00	Romania	27–33	Netherlands	Pitești Arena, Pitești; Attendance: 116; Referees: Hodžić, Brodić (CRO)
7 August 2026; 14:00	Scarlat 6	(13–14)	Ostojic 5	Pitești Arena, Pitești; Attendance: 116; Referees: Hodžić, Brodić (CRO)
7 August 2026; 14:00	1× (suspension)	Report	5× (suspension)	Pitești Arena, Pitești; Attendance: 116; Referees: Hodžić, Brodić (CRO)

==== Ninth place game ====
7 August 2026; 14:00	France	31–38	Japan	Sala Sporturilor, Mioveni; Attendance: 83; Referees: Weijmans, Wolbertus (NED)
7 August 2026; 14:00	Ellisseche 7	(19–18)	Miura 13	Sala Sporturilor, Mioveni; Attendance: 83; Referees: Weijmans, Wolbertus (NED)
7 August 2026; 14:00		Report	1× (suspension)	Sala Sporturilor, Mioveni; Attendance: 83; Referees: Weijmans, Wolbertus (NED)

== Knockout stage ==
=== Bracket ===
Championship bracket

Quarter-finals
6 August
Egypt	30
China	29
6 August
Spain	27
Switzerland	25
6 August
Hungary	20
Denmark	24
6 August
Slovakia	32
Montenegro	33

Semi-finals
7 August
Egypt	26
Spain	27
7 August
Denmark	25
Montenegro	27

Final
9 August
Spain	26
Montenegro	23
Third place
9 August
Egypt	19
Denmark	23

5–8th place bracket

5–8th place semifinals
7 August
China	25
Switzerland	38
7 August
Hungary	29
Slovakia	34

Fifth place game
9 August
Switzerland	37
Slovakia	31
Seventh place game
9 August
China	30
Hungary	27

=== Quarterfinals ===
6 August 2026; 16:00	Egypt	30–29	China	Pitești Arena, Pitești; Attendance: 98; Referees: Correa (ARG), Araújo ( URU)
6 August 2026; 16:00	Kotb 8	(17–13)	Zhang S. 7	Pitești Arena, Pitești; Attendance: 98; Referees: Correa (ARG), Araújo ( URU)
6 August 2026; 16:00	5× (suspension)	Report	2× (yellow card) 4× (suspension)	Pitești Arena, Pitești; Attendance: 98; Referees: Correa (ARG), Araújo ( URU)

6 August 2026; 16:00	Spain	27–25	Switzerland	Sala Sporturilor, Mioveni; Attendance: 135; Referees: Pagh, Thygesen (DEN)
6 August 2026; 16:00	Ferrer, Moreno 4	(13–14)	four players 5	Sala Sporturilor, Mioveni; Attendance: 135; Referees: Pagh, Thygesen (DEN)
6 August 2026; 16:00	2× (suspension)	Report		Sala Sporturilor, Mioveni; Attendance: 135; Referees: Pagh, Thygesen (DEN)

6 August 2026; 18:30	Hungary	20−24	Denmark	Pitești Arena, Pitești; Attendance: 117; Referees: Hellbusch, Jansen (GER)
6 August 2026; 18:30	Nagy-Hajdú 4	(8−11)	Dreisig, Spellerberg 5	Pitești Arena, Pitești; Attendance: 117; Referees: Hellbusch, Jansen (GER)
6 August 2026; 18:30	1× (yellow card) 1× (suspension)	Report	2× (suspension)	Pitești Arena, Pitești; Attendance: 117; Referees: Hellbusch, Jansen (GER)

6 August 2026; 18:30	Slovakia	32−33	Montenegro	Sala Sporturilor, Mioveni; Attendance: 157; Referees: Weijmans, Wolbertus (NED)
6 August 2026; 18:30	three players 6	(17−14)	Jovanović 7	Sala Sporturilor, Mioveni; Attendance: 157; Referees: Weijmans, Wolbertus (NED)
6 August 2026; 18:30	3× (suspension)	Report	1× (yellow card) 5× (suspension)	Sala Sporturilor, Mioveni; Attendance: 157; Referees: Weijmans, Wolbertus (NED)

=== 5–8th place semifinals ===
7 August 2026; 16:15	China	25–38	Switzerland	Sala Sporturilor, Mioveni; Attendance: 72; Referees: Haggui, Haggui (TUN)
7 August 2026; 16:15	Zhang S. 9	(8–17)	three players 6	Sala Sporturilor, Mioveni; Attendance: 72; Referees: Haggui, Haggui (TUN)
7 August 2026; 16:15	2× (suspension)	Report	1× (suspension)	Sala Sporturilor, Mioveni; Attendance: 72; Referees: Haggui, Haggui (TUN)

7 August 2026; 18:30	Hungary	29–34	Slovakia	Sala Sporturilor, Mioveni; Attendance: 68; Referees: Picard, Vauchez (FRA)
7 August 2026; 18:30	Takács 8	(13–17)	Gogová 10	Sala Sporturilor, Mioveni; Attendance: 68; Referees: Picard, Vauchez (FRA)
7 August 2026; 18:30	1× (yellow card) 3× (suspension)	Report	2× (suspension)	Sala Sporturilor, Mioveni; Attendance: 68; Referees: Picard, Vauchez (FRA)

=== Semifinals ===
7 August 2026; 16:15	Egypt	26–27	Spain	Pitești Arena, Pitești; Attendance: 168; Referees: Bozhinovski, Nachevski (MKD)
7 August 2026; 16:15	Farrag 5	(12–13)	Calleja 6	Pitești Arena, Pitești; Attendance: 168; Referees: Bozhinovski, Nachevski (MKD)
7 August 2026; 16:15	1× (suspension)	Report	3× (suspension)	Pitești Arena, Pitești; Attendance: 168; Referees: Bozhinovski, Nachevski (MKD)

7 August 2026; 18:45	Denmark	25–27	Montenegro	Pitești Arena, Pitești; Referees: Dáné, Marton (HUN)
7 August 2026; 18:45	Todsen 7	(11–17)	Savić 10	Pitești Arena, Pitești; Referees: Dáné, Marton (HUN)
7 August 2026; 18:45	4× (suspension)	Report	4× (suspension)	Pitești Arena, Pitești; Referees: Dáné, Marton (HUN)

=== Seventh place game ===
9 August 2026; 11:30	China	30–27	Hungary	Pitești Arena, Pitești; Attendance: 89; Referees: Al-Enezi, Al-Naseem (KUW)
9 August 2026; 11:30	Zhang S. 9	(18–13)	Litschauer, Takács 6	Pitești Arena, Pitești; Attendance: 89; Referees: Al-Enezi, Al-Naseem (KUW)
9 August 2026; 11:30	5× (suspension)	Report	1× (yellow card) 3× (suspension)	Pitești Arena, Pitești; Attendance: 89; Referees: Al-Enezi, Al-Naseem (KUW)

=== Fifth place game ===
9 August 2026; 13:45	Switzerland	37–31	Slovakia	Pitești Arena, Pitești; Attendance: 112; Referees: Chiruță, Murariu (ROU)
9 August 2026; 13:45	Mierzwa 11	(17–15)	Gogová 6	Pitești Arena, Pitești; Attendance: 112; Referees: Chiruță, Murariu (ROU)
9 August 2026; 13:45	3× (suspension)	Report	3× (suspension)	Pitești Arena, Pitești; Attendance: 112; Referees: Chiruță, Murariu (ROU)

=== Third place game ===
9 August 2026; 16:00	Egypt	19–23	Denmark	Pitești Arena, Pitești; Attendance: 312; Referees: Pukšič, Satler (SLO)
9 August 2026; 16:00	Abouelazaiem 6	(11–12)	Dreisig, Hansen 4	Pitești Arena, Pitești; Attendance: 312; Referees: Pukšič, Satler (SLO)
9 August 2026; 16:00	2× (suspension)	Report	2× (suspension)	Pitești Arena, Pitești; Attendance: 312; Referees: Pukšič, Satler (SLO)

=== Final ===
9 August 2026; 18:30	Spain	26–23	Montenegro	Pitești Arena, Pitești; Attendance: 2,150; Referees: Picard, Vauchez (FRA)
9 August 2026; 18:30	Calleja 6	(11–12)	Savić 9	Pitești Arena, Pitești; Attendance: 2,150; Referees: Picard, Vauchez (FRA)
9 August 2026; 18:30	1× (yellow card) 1× (suspension)	Report	3× (suspension)	Pitești Arena, Pitești; Attendance: 2,150; Referees: Picard, Vauchez (FRA)

== Final ranking ==
Rank	Team
1st place, gold medalist(s)	Spain
2nd place, silver medalist(s)	Montenegro
3rd place, bronze medalist(s)	Denmark
4	Egypt
5	Switzerland
6	Slovakia
7	China
8	Hungary
9	Japan
10	France
11	Netherlands
12	Romania
13	Germany
14	South Korea
15	Sweden
16	Slovenia
17	Portugal
18	Croatia
19	Brazil
20	Tunisia
21	Czech Republic
22	Serbia
23	Argentina
24	Kazakhstan
25	Guinea
26	Canada
27	Angola
28	Mexico
29	Uruguay
30	Uzbekistan
31	Algeria
32	Fiji

== Statistics and awards ==
=== Top goalscorers ===
Rank	Name	Goals	Shots	%
1	(Switzerland) Lauryn Mierzwa	71	90	79
2	(China) Zhang Shuoyan	69	102	68
3	(Japan) Hina Miura	63	94	67
4	(Portugal) Catarina Bernardino	54	66	82
5	(Montenegro) Ivana Savić	50	97	52
6	(Hungary) Blanka Szigeti	47	65	72
6	(Tunisia) Nour Ouni	47	73	64
8	(Netherlands) Ivana Kwakman	46	70	66
9	(Japan) Rio Hamaguchi	45	75	60
9	(Portugal) Maria Lopes	45	58	78
9	(Slovenia) Katja Štukelj	45	66	68
9	(Uruguay) Fiorella Olmos	45	70	64

Source: IHF

=== Top goalkeepers ===
Rank	Name	%	Saves	Shots
1	(Croatia) Lora Tetec	44	14	32
2	(Czech Republic) Justýna Hodková	43	40	94
3	(Czech Republic) Tereza Skopcová	42	67	161
4	(France) Gabrielle Kabeya	40	49	124
4	(Romania) Elena Coserea	40	58	146
6	(Denmark) Thilde Skov	39	81	210
6	(Slovakia) Kristína Kubicinová	39	26	67
8	(France) Nayla Pennavayre	38	29	77
9	(Denmark) Emilie Rosendal	37	23	63
10	(Egypt) Jaydaa Salama	36	79	219

Source: IHF

=== All-Star Team ===
The all-star team was announced on 9 August 2026.

Position	Player
Goalkeeper	(Denmark) Thilde Ladegaard Skov
Right wing	(Spain) Erika Vladu
Right back	(Egypt) Malak Aboyoussef
Centre back	(Montenegro) Andrea Dragnić
Left back	(China) Zhang Shuoyan
Left wing	(Switzerland) Lauryn Mierzwa
Pivot	(Egypt) Zeina Kotb
MVP	(Spain) Elene Fresco

== See also ==
- 2026 IHF Women's U20 Handball World Championship
