= 2023 IHF Trophy U17 – North America and the Caribbean =

Women's Junior Handball Championship qualifier

Tournament details
- Host country: Puerto Rico
- Venue: 1 (in 1 host city)
- Dates: 2–6 December
- Teams: 6 (from 1 confederation)

Final positions
- Champions: Guadeloupe
- Runners-up: Canada
- Third place: Martinique
- Fourth place: Greenland

Tournament statistics
- Matches played: 15
- Goals scored: 850 (56.67 per match)
- Top scorers: (Canada) Mahély Lemaire (Puerto Rico) Delianne Rivera (34 goals each)

The 2023 IHF Trophy U17 – North America and the Caribbean took place in Salinas, Puerto Rico, from 2 to 6 December 2023. It acted as the North America and Caribbean qualifying tournament for the 2024 Women's Youth World Handball Championship and 2024 IHF Inter-Continental Trophy. After winning all their games, Guadeloupe won the competition.

== Teams ==
- Canada
- Guadeloupe
- Greenland
- Martinique
- Mexico
- Puerto Rico

== Venue ==
The venue is the Albergue Olímpico in Salinas, Puerto Rico.

== Standings ==
Pos	Team	Pld	W	D	L	GF	GA	GD	Pts	Qualification
1st place, gold medalist(s)	Guadeloupe	5	5	0	0	160	125	+35	10	2024 IHF Inter-Continental Trophy
2nd place, silver medalist(s)	Canada	5	3	0	2	140	139	+1	6 (Note: Canada 28–27 Martinique)	2024 Women's Youth World Handball Championship
3rd place, bronze medalist(s)	Martinique	5	3	0	2	129	116	+13	6	
4	Greenland	5	2	0	3	136	135	+1	4	2024 Women's Youth World Handball Championship
5	Puerto Rico (H)	5	1	0	4	158	179	−21	2 (Note: Puerto Rico 38–30 Mexico)	
6	Mexico	5	1	0	4	127	156	−29	2	

Source: Report
Rules for classification: 1) Points; 2) Head-to-head points; 3) Head-to-head goal difference; 4) Head-to-head goals scored; 5) Goal difference; 6) Goals scored; 7) Draw.
(H) Hosts

== Results ==
All times are local (UTC–4).

2 December 2023; 15:00	Greenland	17–19	Martinique	Albergue Olímpico, Salinas
2 December 2023; 15:00		(9–6)		Albergue Olímpico, Salinas
2 December 2023; 15:00		Report		Albergue Olímpico, Salinas

2 December 2023; 17:00	Guadeloupe	33–29	Mexico	Albergue Olímpico, Salinas
2 December 2023; 17:00		(12–13)		Albergue Olímpico, Salinas
2 December 2023; 17:00		Report		Albergue Olímpico, Salinas

2 December 2023; 19:00	Canada	38–31	Puerto Rico	Albergue Olímpico, Salinas
2 December 2023; 19:00		(18–14)		Albergue Olímpico, Salinas
2 December 2023; 19:00		Report		Albergue Olímpico, Salinas

3 December 2023; 15:00	Martinique	27–28	Canada	Albergue Olímpico, Salinas
3 December 2023; 15:00		(11–15)		Albergue Olímpico, Salinas
3 December 2023; 15:00		Report		Albergue Olímpico, Salinas

3 December 2023; 17:00	Mexico	26–25	Greenland	Albergue Olímpico, Salinas
3 December 2023; 17:00		(14–14)		Albergue Olímpico, Salinas
3 December 2023; 17:00		Report		Albergue Olímpico, Salinas

3 December 2023; 19:00	Puerto Rico	30–42	Guadeloupe	Albergue Olímpico, Salinas
3 December 2023; 19:00		(20–17)		Albergue Olímpico, Salinas
3 December 2023; 19:00		Report		Albergue Olímpico, Salinas

4 December 2023; 15:00	Canada	29–21	Mexico	Albergue Olímpico, Salinas
4 December 2023; 15:00		(14–12)		Albergue Olímpico, Salinas
4 December 2023; 15:00		Report		Albergue Olímpico, Salinas

4 December 2023; 17:00	Guadeloupe	28–26	Greenland	Albergue Olímpico, Salinas
4 December 2023; 17:00		(13–8)		Albergue Olímpico, Salinas
4 December 2023; 17:00		Report		Albergue Olímpico, Salinas

4 December 2023; 19:00	Puerto Rico	23–31	Martinique	Albergue Olímpico, Salinas
4 December 2023; 19:00		(11–11)		Albergue Olímpico, Salinas
4 December 2023; 19:00		Report		Albergue Olímpico, Salinas

5 December 2023; 15:00	Guadeloupe	27–21	Martinique	Albergue Olímpico, Salinas
5 December 2023; 15:00		(14–11)		Albergue Olímpico, Salinas
5 December 2023; 15:00		Report		Albergue Olímpico, Salinas

5 December 2023; 17:00	Greenland	30–26	Canada	Albergue Olímpico, Salinas
5 December 2023; 17:00		(11–11)		Albergue Olímpico, Salinas
5 December 2023; 17:00		Report		Albergue Olímpico, Salinas

5 December 2023; 19:00	Mexico	30–38	Puerto Rico	Albergue Olímpico, Salinas
5 December 2023; 19:00		(13–24)		Albergue Olímpico, Salinas
5 December 2023; 19:00		Report		Albergue Olímpico, Salinas

6 December 2023; 15:00	Martinique	31–21	Mexico	Albergue Olímpico, Salinas
6 December 2023; 15:00		(15–12)		Albergue Olímpico, Salinas
6 December 2023; 15:00		Report		Albergue Olímpico, Salinas

6 December 2023; 17:00	Canada	19–30	Guadeloupe	Albergue Olímpico, Salinas
6 December 2023; 17:00		(13–17)		Albergue Olímpico, Salinas
6 December 2023; 17:00		Report		Albergue Olímpico, Salinas

6 December 2023; 19:00	Puerto Rico	36–38	Greenland	Albergue Olímpico, Salinas
6 December 2023; 19:00		(19–16)		Albergue Olímpico, Salinas
6 December 2023; 19:00		Report		Albergue Olímpico, Salinas

== See also ==
- Nor.Ca. Women's Handball Championship
- 2024 Women's Youth World Handball Championship
- 2024 IHF Inter-Continental Trophy
