= 2025 IHF Trophy U17 – Oceania =

Women's Youth Handball Championship qualifier

Tournament details
- Host country: Cook Islands
- Venue: 1 (in 1 host city)
- Dates: 13–17 October
- Teams: 5 (from 1 confederation)

Final positions
- Champions: New Caledonia
- Runners-up: New Zealand
- Third place: Fiji
- Fourth place: Australia

Tournament statistics
- Matches played: 10

The 2025 IHF Trophy U17 – Oceania took place in Rarotonga, Cook Islands, from 13 to 17 October 2025. It acted as the Oceanian qualifying tournament for the 2026 IHF Women's U18 Handball World Championship and 2026 IHF Inter-Continental Trophy.

New Caledonia won the championship after winning the round robin. As New Caledonia is not a full member of the IHF and New Zealand declined the World Championship spot, third place Fiji was given the spot World Championship.

== Teams ==
- Australia
- Fiji
- New Caledonia
- New Zealand
- Tahiti

== Standings ==
Pos	Team	Pld	W	D	L	GF	GA	GD	Pts	Qualification
1st place, gold medalist(s)	New Caledonia	4	4	0	0	115	72	+43	8	2026 IHF Inter-Continental Trophy
2nd place, silver medalist(s)	New Zealand	4	2	0	2	135	61	+74	4 (Note: New Zealand 36–14 Fiji)	
3rd place, bronze medalist(s)	Fiji	4	2	0	2	84	113	−29	4	2026 IHF Women's U18 Handball World Championship
4	Australia	4	1	0	3	65	107	−42	2 (Note: Australia 18–13 Tahiti)	
5	Tahiti	4	1	0	3	52	98	−46	2	

Source: 2025 IHF Trophy U17 – Oceania
Rules for classification: 1) Points; 2) Head-to-head points; 3) Head-to-head goal difference; 4) Head-to-head goals scored; 5) Goal difference; 6) Goals scored; 7) Draw.

== Results ==
All times are local.

13 October 2025; 11:00	New Zealand	41–15	Australia	Telecom Sport Arena, Rarotonga
13 October 2025; 11:00		(16–6)		Telecom Sport Arena, Rarotonga
13 October 2025; 11:00		Report		Telecom Sport Arena, Rarotonga

13 October 2025; 13:00	New Caledonia	26–12	Tahiti	Telecom Sport Arena, Rarotonga
13 October 2025; 13:00		(13–3)		Telecom Sport Arena, Rarotonga
13 October 2025; 13:00		Report		Telecom Sport Arena, Rarotonga

14 October 2025; 11:00	Australia	18–13	Tahiti	Telecom Sport Arena, Rarotonga
14 October 2025; 11:00		(8–4)		Telecom Sport Arena, Rarotonga
14 October 2025; 11:00		Report		Telecom Sport Arena, Rarotonga

14 October 2025; 13:00	New Zealand	39–14	Fiji	Telecom Sport Arena, Rarotonga
14 October 2025; 13:00		(22–9)		Telecom Sport Arena, Rarotonga
14 October 2025; 13:00		Report		Telecom Sport Arena, Rarotonga

15 October 2025; 11:00	Fiji	20–35	New Caledonia	Telecom Sport Arena, Rarotonga
15 October 2025; 11:00		(8–17)		Telecom Sport Arena, Rarotonga
15 October 2025; 11:00		Report		Telecom Sport Arena, Rarotonga

15 October 2025; 13:00	Tahiti	7–28	New Zealand	Telecom Sport Arena, Rarotonga
15 October 2025; 13:00		(2–15)		Telecom Sport Arena, Rarotonga
15 October 2025; 13:00		Report		Telecom Sport Arena, Rarotonga

16 October 2025; 11:00	Fiji	26–20	Tahiti	Telecom Sport Arena, Rarotonga
16 October 2025; 11:00		(14–10)		Telecom Sport Arena, Rarotonga
16 October 2025; 11:00		Report		Telecom Sport Arena, Rarotonga

16 October 2025; 13:00	New Caledonia	29–13	Australia	Telecom Sport Arena, Rarotonga
16 October 2025; 13:00		(15–7)		Telecom Sport Arena, Rarotonga
16 October 2025; 13:00		Report		Telecom Sport Arena, Rarotonga

17 October 2025; 11:00	New Caledonia	25–27	New Zealand	Telecom Sport Arena, Rarotonga
17 October 2025; 11:00		(12–12)		Telecom Sport Arena, Rarotonga
17 October 2025; 11:00		Report		Telecom Sport Arena, Rarotonga

17 October 2025; 13:00	Australia	19–24	Fiji	Telecom Sport Arena, Rarotonga
17 October 2025; 13:00		(9–12)		Telecom Sport Arena, Rarotonga
17 October 2025; 13:00		Report		Telecom Sport Arena, Rarotonga

== See also ==
- 2026 IHF Women's U18 Handball World Championship
- 2026 IHF Inter-Continental Trophy
