= Slovenia women's national youth handball team =

Slovenia

Information
- Association: Handball Federation of Slovenia
- Coach: Jernej Rantah

Colours
1st	2nd

Results

IHF U-18 World Championship
- Appearances: 4 (First in 2006)
- Best result: 5th (2006)
- Last updated on Unknown.

The Slovenia women's youth national handball team is the national under-17 handball team of Slovenia. Controlled by the Handball Federation of Slovenia it represents the country in international matches.

== World Championship record ==
- 2006 – 5th place
- 2016 – 16th place
- 2022 – 20th place
- 2026 – 16th place
