= 2024 IHF Inter-Continental Trophy =

2024 Women's IHF Inter-Continental Trophy
Tournament details
- Host country: Uzbekistan
- Venue: 1 (in 1 host city)
- Dates: 28 February – 3 March

The 2024 IHF Inter-Continental Trophy was held in Tashkent, Uzbekistan from 28 February to 3 March 2024. It featured a women's youth (U-18) tournament and a women's junior (U-20) tournament.

== Junior tournament ==
=== Qualification ===
Confederation	Dates	Host	Vacancies	Qualified
Africa (CAHB)	8–12 August 2023	(Ivory Coast) Abidjan	1	Mali
Europe (EHF)	11–15 October 2023	(Kosovo) Pristina	1	Great Britain
Oceania (OCHF)	16–20 October 2023	(New Caledonia) Païta	1	New Caledonia
Asia (AHF)	6–11 November 2023	(Uzbekistan) Tashkent	1	Uzbekistan
South and Central America (SCAHC)	14–18 November 2023	(Argentina) Buenos Aires	1	Peru
North America & the Caribbean (NACHC)	9–13 December 2023	Mexico City	1	Mexico

=== Preliminary round ===
All times are local (UTC+5).

==== Group A ====
Pos	Team	Pld	W	D	L	GF	GA	GD	Pts	Qualification
1	Great Britain	2	2	0	0	66	33	+33	4	Semifinals
2	Guinea	2	1	0	1	74	37	+37	2	Semifinals
3	Peru	2	0	0	2	23	93	−70	0	Fifth place game

Source: IHF
Rules for classification: 1) points; 2) head-to-head points; 3) head-to-head goal difference; 4) head-to-head number of goals scored; 5) goal difference.

28 February 2024; 14:45	Peru	12–40	Great Britain	Alpomish Ice Arena, Tashkent; Attendance: 150
28 February 2024; 14:45		(4–22)		Alpomish Ice Arena, Tashkent; Attendance: 150
28 February 2024; 14:45		Report		Alpomish Ice Arena, Tashkent; Attendance: 150

29 February 2024; 14:00	Guinea	53–11	Peru	Alpomish Ice Arena, Tashkent; Attendance: 150
29 February 2024; 14:00		(25–5)		Alpomish Ice Arena, Tashkent; Attendance: 150
29 February 2024; 14:00		Report		Alpomish Ice Arena, Tashkent; Attendance: 150

1 March 2024; 14:00	Great Britain	26–21	Guinea	Alpomish Ice Arena, Tashkent; Attendance: 150
1 March 2024; 14:00		(15–11)		Alpomish Ice Arena, Tashkent; Attendance: 150
1 March 2024; 14:00		Report		Alpomish Ice Arena, Tashkent; Attendance: 150

==== Group B ====
Pos	Team	Pld	W	D	L	GF	GA	GD	Pts	Qualification
1	Uzbekistan (H)	2	2	0	0	88	43	+45	4	Semifinals
2	Mexico	2	1	0	1	43	60	−17	2	Semifinals
3	New Caledonia	2	0	0	2	32	60	−28	0	Fifth place game

Source: IHF
Rules for classification: 1) points; 2) head-to-head points; 3) head-to-head goal difference; 4) head-to-head number of goals scored; 5) goal difference.
(H) Hosts

28 February 2024; 11:45	Uzbekistan	45–26	Mexico	Alpomish Ice Arena, Tashkent; Attendance: 200
28 February 2024; 11:45		(26–13)		Alpomish Ice Arena, Tashkent; Attendance: 200
28 February 2024; 11:45		Report		Alpomish Ice Arena, Tashkent; Attendance: 200

29 February 2024; 16:00	New Caledonia	17–43	Uzbekistan	Alpomish Ice Arena, Tashkent; Attendance: 200
29 February 2024; 16:00		(6–22)		Alpomish Ice Arena, Tashkent; Attendance: 200
29 February 2024; 16:00		Report		Alpomish Ice Arena, Tashkent; Attendance: 200

1 March 2024; 16:00	Mexico	17–15	New Caledonia	Alpomish Ice Arena, Tashkent; Attendance: 150
1 March 2024; 16:00		(9–7)		Alpomish Ice Arena, Tashkent; Attendance: 150
1 March 2024; 16:00		Report		Alpomish Ice Arena, Tashkent; Attendance: 150

=== Knockout round ===
==== Bracket ====
Semi-finals
2 March
Great Britain	31
Mexico	13
2 March
Uzbekistan (OT)	29
Guinea	27

Final
3 March
Great Britain	23
Uzbekistan	33
Third place
3 March
Mexico	17
Guinea	27

==== Semifinals ====
2 March 2024; 17:00	Great Britain	31–13	Mexico	Alpomish Ice Arena, Tashkent; Attendance: 150
2 March 2024; 17:00		(16–4)		Alpomish Ice Arena, Tashkent; Attendance: 150
2 March 2024; 17:00		Report		Alpomish Ice Arena, Tashkent; Attendance: 150

2 March 2024
19:00
Uzbekistan
29–27 (ET)
Guinea
Alpomish Ice Arena, Tashkent
Attendance: 350

(13–11)

Report

FT: 25–25 ET: 4–2

==== Fifth place game ====
2 March 2024; 11:00	Peru	26–29	New Caledonia	Alpomish Ice Arena, Tashkent; Attendance: 200
2 March 2024; 11:00		(11–8)		Alpomish Ice Arena, Tashkent; Attendance: 200
2 March 2024; 11:00		Report		Alpomish Ice Arena, Tashkent; Attendance: 200

==== Third place game ====
3 March 2024; 12:00	Mexico	17–27	Guinea	Alpomish Ice Arena, Tashkent; Attendance: 100
3 March 2024; 12:00		(9–11)		Alpomish Ice Arena, Tashkent; Attendance: 100
3 March 2024; 12:00		Report		Alpomish Ice Arena, Tashkent; Attendance: 100

==== Final ====
3 March 2024; 16:00	Great Britain	23–33	Uzbekistan	Alpomish Ice Arena, Tashkent; Attendance: 500; Referees: Al-Enezi, Al-Naseem (KUW)
3 March 2024; 16:00	Warren 6	(14–15)	Erkabaeva 10	Alpomish Ice Arena, Tashkent; Attendance: 500; Referees: Al-Enezi, Al-Naseem (KUW)
3 March 2024; 16:00	1× (yellow card) 3× (suspension)	Report	5× (suspension)	Alpomish Ice Arena, Tashkent; Attendance: 500; Referees: Al-Enezi, Al-Naseem (KUW)

=== Final ranking ===
Rank	Team
1	Uzbekistan
2	Great Britain
3	Guinea
4	Mexico
5	New Caledonia
6	Peru

Team qualified to the 2024 Women's Junior World Handball Championship

== Youth tournament ==
=== Qualification ===
Confederation	Dates	Host	Vacancies	Qualified
Africa (CAHB)	8–12 August 2023	(Ivory Coast) Abidjan	1	Nigeria
Europe (EHF)	11–15 October 2023	(Kosovo) Pristina	1	Kosovo
Oceania (OCHF)	16–20 October 2023	(New Caledonia) Païta	1	New Caledonia
Asia (AHF)	6–11 November 2023	(Uzbekistan) Tashkent	1	Uzbekistan
South and Central America (SCAHC)	21–25 November 2023	(Argentina) Buenos Aires	1	Guatemala
North America & the Caribbean (NACHC)	2–6 December 2023	(Puerto Rico) Salinas	1	Guadeloupe

=== Preliminary round ===
All times are local (UTC+5).

==== Group A ====
Pos	Team	Pld	W	D	L	GF	GA	GD	Pts	Qualification
1	Nigeria	2	2	0	0	57	37	+20	4	Semifinals
2	New Caledonia	2	1	0	1	39	48	−9	2	Semifinals
3	Guadeloupe	2	0	0	2	42	53	−11	0	Fifth place game

Source: IHF
Rules for classification: 1) points; 2) head-to-head points; 3) head-to-head goal difference; 4) head-to-head number of goals scored; 5) goal difference.

28 February 2024; 10:00	Nigeria	28–23	Guadeloupe	Alpomish Ice Arena, Tashkent; Attendance: 200
28 February 2024; 10:00		(16–9)		Alpomish Ice Arena, Tashkent; Attendance: 200
28 February 2024; 10:00		Report		Alpomish Ice Arena, Tashkent; Attendance: 200

29 February 2024; 10:00	New Caledonia	14–29	Nigeria	Alpomish Ice Arena, Tashkent; Attendance: 100
29 February 2024; 10:00		(7–15)		Alpomish Ice Arena, Tashkent; Attendance: 100
29 February 2024; 10:00		Report		Alpomish Ice Arena, Tashkent; Attendance: 100

1 March 2024; 10:00	Guadeloupe	19–25	New Caledonia	Alpomish Ice Arena, Tashkent; Attendance: 100
1 March 2024; 10:00		(14–13)		Alpomish Ice Arena, Tashkent; Attendance: 100
1 March 2024; 10:00		Report		Alpomish Ice Arena, Tashkent; Attendance: 100

==== Group B ====
Pos	Team	Pld	W	D	L	GF	GA	GD	Pts	Qualification
1	Kosovo	2	2	0	0	58	33	+25	4	Semifinals
2	Uzbekistan (H)	2	1	0	1	57	46	+11	2	Semifinals
3	Guatemala	2	0	0	2	31	67	−36	0	Fifth place game

Source: IHF
Rules for classification: 1) points; 2) head-to-head points; 3) head-to-head goal difference; 4) head-to-head number of goals scored; 5) goal difference.
(H) Hosts

28 February 2024; 12:45	Uzbekistan	36–19	Guatemala	Alpomish Ice Arena, Tashkent; Attendance: 150
28 February 2024; 12:45		(18–9)		Alpomish Ice Arena, Tashkent; Attendance: 150
28 February 2024; 12:45		Report		Alpomish Ice Arena, Tashkent; Attendance: 150

29 February 2024; 12:00	Kosovo	27–21	Uzbekistan	Alpomish Ice Arena, Tashkent; Attendance: 150
29 February 2024; 12:00		(13–8)		Alpomish Ice Arena, Tashkent; Attendance: 150
29 February 2024; 12:00		Report		Alpomish Ice Arena, Tashkent; Attendance: 150

1 March 2024; 12:00	Guatemala	12–31	Kosovo	Alpomish Ice Arena, Tashkent; Attendance: 100
1 March 2024; 12:00		(6–12)		Alpomish Ice Arena, Tashkent; Attendance: 100
1 March 2024; 12:00		Report		Alpomish Ice Arena, Tashkent; Attendance: 100

=== Knockout round ===
==== Bracket ====
Semi-finals
2 March
Nigeria	32
Uzbekistan	28
2 March
Kosovo	27
New Caledonia	16

Final
3 March
Nigeria	16
Kosovo	22
Third place
3 March
Uzbekistan	24
New Caledonia	18

==== Semifinals ====
2 March 2024; 13:00	Nigeria	32–28	Uzbekistan	Alpomish Ice Arena, Tashkent; Attendance: 400
2 March 2024; 13:00		(16–4)		Alpomish Ice Arena, Tashkent; Attendance: 400
2 March 2024; 13:00		Report		Alpomish Ice Arena, Tashkent; Attendance: 400

2 March 2024; 15:00	Kosovo	27–16	New Caledonia	Alpomish Ice Arena, Tashkent; Attendance: 150
2 March 2024; 15:00		(14–10)		Alpomish Ice Arena, Tashkent; Attendance: 150
2 March 2024; 15:00		Report		Alpomish Ice Arena, Tashkent; Attendance: 150

==== Fifth place game ====
2 March 2024; 09:00	Guadeloupe	20–15	Guatemala	Alpomish Ice Arena, Tashkent; Attendance: 100
2 March 2024; 09:00		(8–6)		Alpomish Ice Arena, Tashkent; Attendance: 100
2 March 2024; 09:00		Report		Alpomish Ice Arena, Tashkent; Attendance: 100

==== Third place game ====
3 March 2024; 10:00	Uzbekistan	24–18	New Caledonia	Alpomish Ice Arena, Tashkent; Attendance: 200
3 March 2024; 10:00		(15–8)		Alpomish Ice Arena, Tashkent; Attendance: 200
3 March 2024; 10:00		Report		Alpomish Ice Arena, Tashkent; Attendance: 200

==== Final ====
3 March 2024; 14:00	Nigeria	16–22	Kosovo	Alpomish Ice Arena, Tashkent; Attendance: 250; Referees: Ismoilov, Ismoilov (UZB)
3 March 2024; 14:00	Matthew 5	(10–10)	Dresh 7	Alpomish Ice Arena, Tashkent; Attendance: 250; Referees: Ismoilov, Ismoilov (UZB)
3 March 2024; 14:00	1× (yellow card) 4× (suspension)	Report	1× (yellow card) 5× (suspension)	Alpomish Ice Arena, Tashkent; Attendance: 250; Referees: Ismoilov, Ismoilov (UZB)

=== Final ranking ===
Rank	Team
1	Kosovo
2	Nigeria
3	Uzbekistan
4	New Caledonia
5	Guadeloupe
6	Guatemala

Team qualified to the 2024 Women's Youth World Handball Championship
