= 2006 Women's Youth World Handball Championship =

Tournament details
- Host country: Canada
- Venue: 1 (in 1 host city)
- Dates: 11 – 20 August 2006
- Teams: 12 (from 4 confederations)

Final positions
- Champions: Denmark (1st title)
- Runners-up: South Korea
- Third place: Romania
- Fourth place: France

Tournament statistics
- Matches played: 38

The 2006 Women's Youth World Handball Championship was the first edition of the tournament and took place in Sherbrooke, Quebec, Canada from 11 to 20 August 2006. Denmark won the final against Korea.

== Draw ==
| Group A | Group B |
|---|---|
| Romania | Denmark |
| Japan | South Korea |
| Brazil | Argentina |
| Tunisia | ~~Ivory Coast~~ |
| Slovenia | Canada |
| France | Thailand |

- Ivory Coast withdrew from the tournament after the draw of preliminary groups.

== Results of group A ==
| 11 August 2006 | Tunisia | 17-32 | France | Palais des Sports Léopold-Drolet, Sherbrooke |
| 11 August 2006 | | (8-15) | | Palais des Sports Léopold-Drolet, Sherbrooke |

| 12 August 2006 | Japan | 21-31 | Slovenia | Palais des Sports Léopold-Drolet, Sherbrooke |
| 12 August 2006 | | (13-15) | | Palais des Sports Léopold-Drolet, Sherbrooke |

| 12 August 2006 | Romania | 31-26 | Brazil | Palais des Sports Léopold-Drolet, Sherbrooke |
| 12 August 2006 | | (13-12) | | Palais des Sports Léopold-Drolet, Sherbrooke |

| 13 August 2006 | Japan | 20-35 | France | Palais des Sports Léopold-Drolet, Sherbrooke |
| 13 August 2006 | | (11-14) | | Palais des Sports Léopold-Drolet, Sherbrooke |

| 13 August 2006 | Romania | 28-22 | Tunisia | Palais des Sports Léopold-Drolet, Sherbrooke |
| 13 August 2006 | | (14-10) | | Palais des Sports Léopold-Drolet, Sherbrooke |

| 14 August 2006 | Romania | 27-23 | Slovenia | Palais des Sports Léopold-Drolet, Sherbrooke |
| 14 August 2006 | | (16-7) | | Palais des Sports Léopold-Drolet, Sherbrooke |

| 14 August 2006 | Japan | 29-28 | Brazil | Palais des Sports Léopold-Drolet, Sherbrooke |
| 14 August 2006 | | (13-13) | | Palais des Sports Léopold-Drolet, Sherbrooke |

| 15 August 2006 | Tunisia | 28-32 | Slovenia | Palais des Sports Léopold-Drolet, Sherbrooke |
| 15 August 2006 | | (17-18) | | Palais des Sports Léopold-Drolet, Sherbrooke |

| 15 August 2006 | Brazil | 22-25 | France | Palais des Sports Léopold-Drolet, Sherbrooke |
| 15 August 2006 | | (11-13) | | Palais des Sports Léopold-Drolet, Sherbrooke |

| 16 August 2006 | Japan | 34-22 | Tunisia | Palais des Sports Léopold-Drolet, Sherbrooke |
| 16 August 2006 | | (15-11) | | Palais des Sports Léopold-Drolet, Sherbrooke |

| 16 August 2006 | Romania | 20-26 | France | Palais des Sports Léopold-Drolet, Sherbrooke |
| 16 August 2006 | | (10-9) | | Palais des Sports Léopold-Drolet, Sherbrooke |

| 17 August 2006 | Brazil | 30-24 | Slovenia | Palais des Sports Léopold-Drolet, Sherbrooke |
| 17 August 2006 | | (11-13) | | Palais des Sports Léopold-Drolet, Sherbrooke |

| 17 August 2006 | Romania | 38-29 | Japan | Palais des Sports Léopold-Drolet, Sherbrooke |
| 17 August 2006 | | (21-15) | | Palais des Sports Léopold-Drolet, Sherbrooke |

| 18 August 2006 | Brazil | 28-21 | Tunisia | Palais des Sports Léopold-Drolet, Sherbrooke |
| 18 August 2006 | | (12-8) | | Palais des Sports Léopold-Drolet, Sherbrooke |

| 18 August 2006 | Slovenia | 27-24 | France | Palais des Sports Léopold-Drolet, Sherbrooke |
| 18 August 2006 | | (14-12) | | Palais des Sports Léopold-Drolet, Sherbrooke |

== Results of group B ==
| 12 August 2006 | Denmark | 34-18 | Argentina | Palais des Sports Léopold-Drolet, Sherbrooke |
| 12 August 2006 | | (20-7) | | Palais des Sports Léopold-Drolet, Sherbrooke |

| 12 August 2006 | South Korea | 46-22 | Canada | Palais des Sports Léopold-Drolet, Sherbrooke |
| 12 August 2006 | | (22-12) | | Palais des Sports Léopold-Drolet, Sherbrooke |

| 13 August 2006 | South Korea | 39-17 | Thailand | Palais des Sports Léopold-Drolet, Sherbrooke |
| 13 August 2006 | | (21-10) | | Palais des Sports Léopold-Drolet, Sherbrooke |

| 14 August 2006 | Denmark | 53-13 | Canada | Palais des Sports Léopold-Drolet, Sherbrooke |
| 14 August 2006 | | (23-6) | | Palais des Sports Léopold-Drolet, Sherbrooke |

| 14 August 2006 | South Korea | 40-28 | Argentina | Palais des Sports Léopold-Drolet, Sherbrooke |
| 14 August 2006 | | (19-12) | | Palais des Sports Léopold-Drolet, Sherbrooke |

| 15 August 2006 | Argentina | 30-21 | Thailand | Palais des Sports Léopold-Drolet, Sherbrooke |
| 15 August 2006 | | (10-12) | | Palais des Sports Léopold-Drolet, Sherbrooke |

| 16 August 2006 | Denmark | 49-15 | Thailand | Palais des Sports Léopold-Drolet, Sherbrooke |
| 16 August 2006 | | (27-7) | | Palais des Sports Léopold-Drolet, Sherbrooke |

| 17 August 2006 | Argentina | 27-15 | Canada | Palais des Sports Léopold-Drolet, Sherbrooke |
| 17 August 2006 | | (15-9) | | Palais des Sports Léopold-Drolet, Sherbrooke |

| 17 August 2006 | Denmark | 30-29 | South Korea | Palais des Sports Léopold-Drolet, Sherbrooke |
| 17 August 2006 | | (16-18) | | Palais des Sports Léopold-Drolet, Sherbrooke |

| 18 August 2006 | Canada | 23-26 | Thailand | Palais des Sports Léopold-Drolet, Sherbrooke |
| 18 August 2006 | | (10-12) | | Palais des Sports Léopold-Drolet, Sherbrooke |

== Knockout stage ==
=== Semifinal matches ===
| 19 August 2006; 13:30 | France | 31-32 | South Korea | Palais des Sports Léopold-Drolet, Sherbrooke |
| 19 August 2006; 13:30 | | (13-18) | | Palais des Sports Léopold-Drolet, Sherbrooke |

| 19 August 2006; 16:00 | Denmark | 34-32 (ET) | Romania | Palais des Sports Léopold-Drolet, Sherbrooke |
| 19 August 2006; 16:00 | | (15-16) | | Palais des Sports Léopold-Drolet, Sherbrooke |

FT : 28-28; ET 1 : 6-4

=== Bronze-medal match ===
| 20 August 2006 | France | 28-30 | Romania | Palais des Sports Léopold-Drolet, Sherbrooke |
| 20 August 2006 | L. Bouchon 7 | (22-13) | C. Neagu 11 | Palais des Sports Léopold-Drolet, Sherbrooke |
| 20 August 2006 | 2× (yellow card) 3× (suspension) | | 3× (yellow card) 1× (suspension) | Palais des Sports Léopold-Drolet, Sherbrooke |

=== Gold-medal match ===
| 20 August 2006 | South Korea | 33-36 | Denmark | Palais des Sports Léopold-Drolet, Sherbrooke; Referees: Marina, Minore (ARG) |
| 20 August 2006 | Kim 9 | (19-17) | L. Jørgensen 9 | Palais des Sports Léopold-Drolet, Sherbrooke; Referees: Marina, Minore (ARG) |
| 20 August 2006 | 3× (yellow card) | | 2× (yellow card) | Palais des Sports Léopold-Drolet, Sherbrooke; Referees: Marina, Minore (ARG) |

== Final standings ==
| Rank | Team |
|---|---|
| Gold medal | Denmark |
| Silver medal | South Korea |
| Bronze medal | Romania |
| 4 | France |
| 5 | Slovenia |
| 6 | Argentina |
| 7 | Japan |
| 8 | Thailand |
| 9 | Brazil |
| 10 | Canada |
| 11 | Tunisia |

== Awards ==
2006 Women's Youth World Champions

Denmark
1st Title

Team roster

Sandra Toft, Stine Bonde, Mia Boesen, Lærke W. Møller, Mie Augustesen, Susan Sorensen, Stine Nyegaard, Rasmussen, Amalie Sorensen, Louise Luksborg, Ditte E. Kelså, Kristiansen, Line R. Jørgensen, Anne Ostergaard, Aalling
Officials: A - Heine Eriksen B - Flemming Dam C - Tove Jensen D - Jens Bo Jørgensen
