= Pitești Arena =

Arena in Pitești, Romania

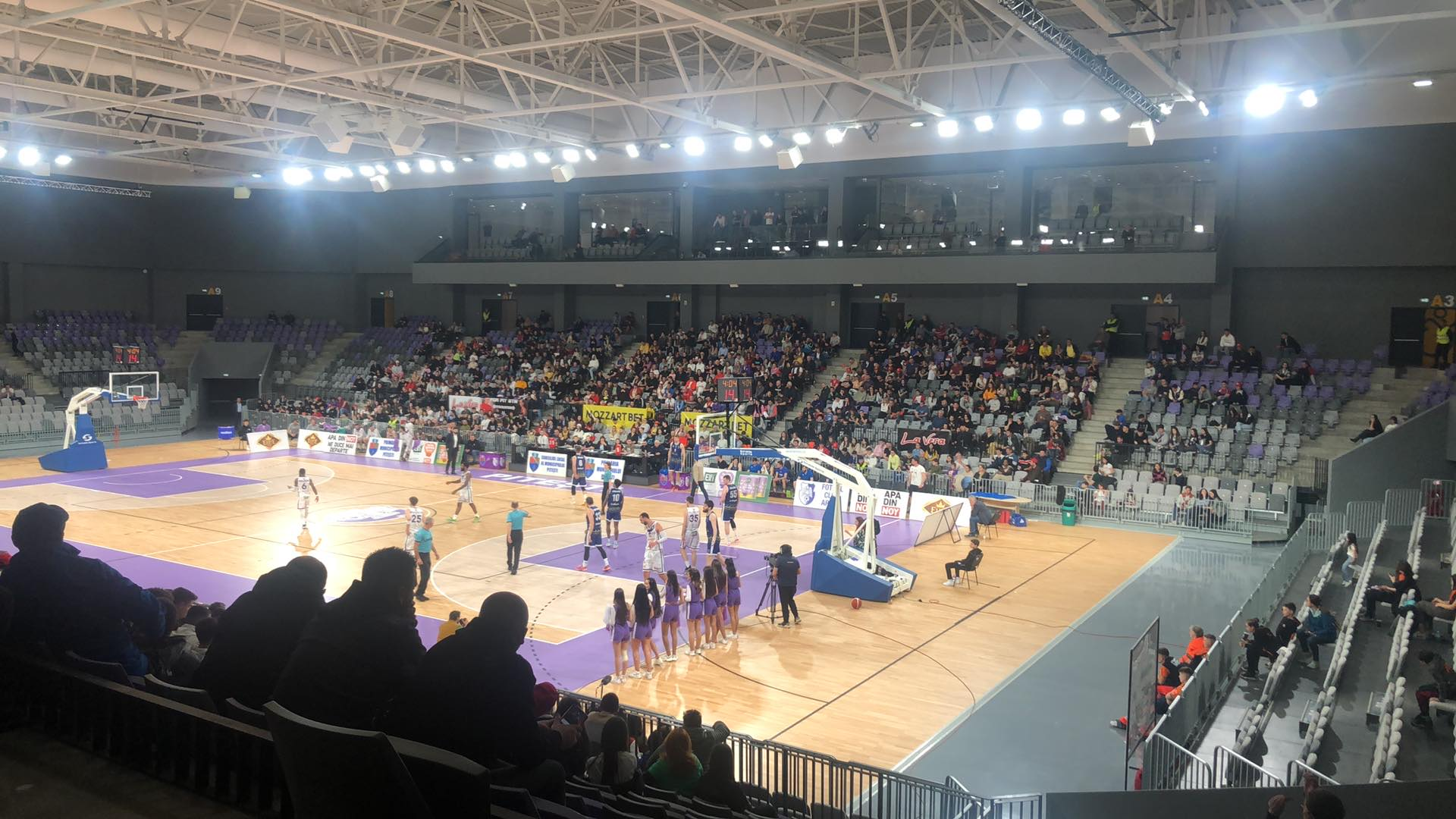
- Interactive map of Pitești Arena
- Address: 35 Basarabia Street
- Location: Pitești, Romania
- Owner: City of Pitești
- Capacity: 4,900
- Type: Arena

Construction
- Groundbreaking: June 2020
- Opened: December 2022
- Cost: €21 million
- Architect: Con-A
- General contractor: CNI

Tenant
- FC Argeș Pitești (LNBM) (2022–present)

Pitești Arena is a multi-purpose arena located in Pitești, Romania.

== Gallery ==
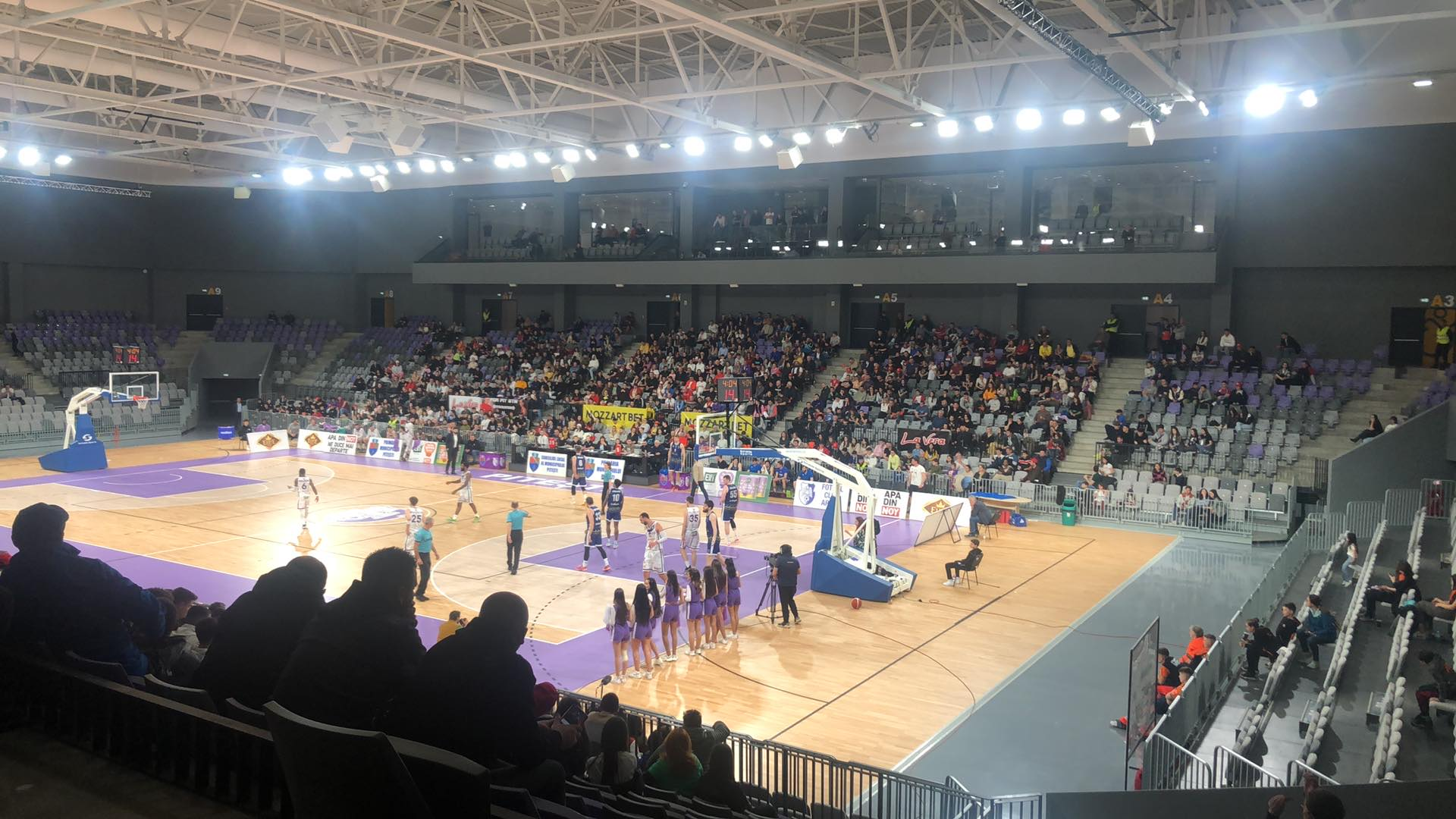

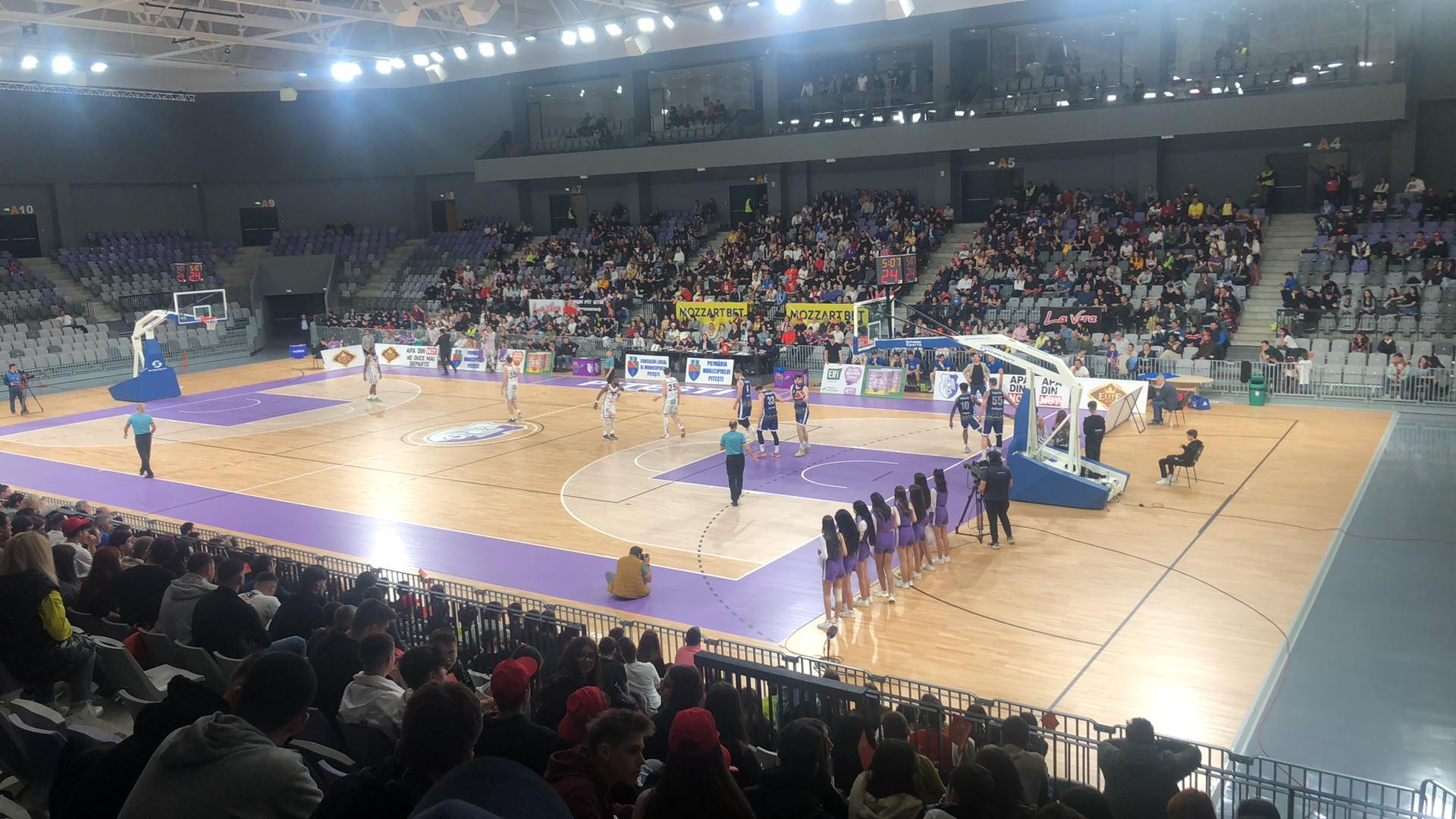

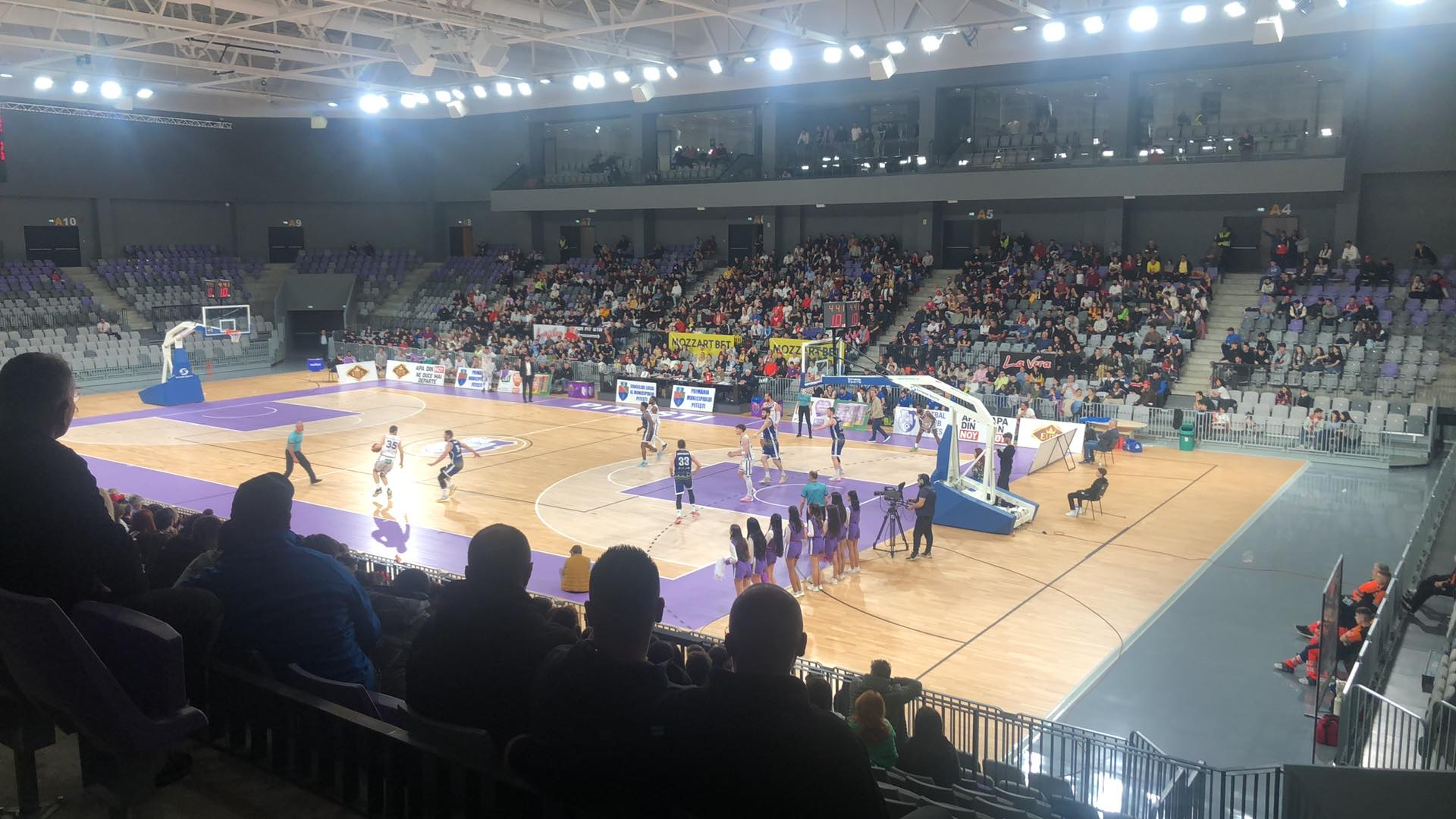

== See also ==
- List of indoor arenas in Romania
