= Fiji women's national youth handball team =

Fiji

Information
- Association: Fiji Islands Handball Federation
- Coach: Dickinson Garoleo

Colours
1st	2nd

Results

IHF U-18 World Championship
- Appearances: 1 (First in 2026)
- Best result: 32nd (2026)
- Last updated on Unknown.

The Fiji women's youth national handball team is the national under-17 handball team of Fiji. Controlled by the Fiji Islands Handball Federation it represents the country in international matches.

== World Championship record ==
- 2026 – 32nd place
