= Canada women's national youth handball team =

Canada

Information
- Association: Canadian Team Handball Federation
- Coach: Eric Choquette

Colours
1st	2nd

Results

IHF U-18 World Championship
- Appearances: 3 (First in 2006)
- Best result: 10th (2006)
- Last updated on Unknown.

The Canada women's youth national handball team is the national under-17 handball team of Canada. Controlled by the Canadian Team Handball Federation it represents the country in international matches.

== World Championship record ==
- 2006 – 10th place
- 2024 – 31st place
- 2026 – 26th place
