= Mexico women's national youth handball team =

Mexico

Information
- Association: Mexican Handball Federation
- Coach: Selene Sifuentes

Colours
| 1st | 2nd |

Results

IHF U-18 World Championship
- Appearances: 1 (First in 2026)
- Best result: 28th (2026)
- Last updated on Unknown.

The Mexico women's youth national handball team is the national under-17 handball team of Mexico. Controlled by the Mexican Handball Federation it represents the country in international matches.

== World Championship record ==
- 2026 – 28th place
