= 2014 Women's Youth World Handball Championship =

2014 Women Youth World Championship in Macedonia

Tournament details
- Host country: Macedonia
- Venues: 3 (in 3 host cities)
- Dates: 20 July – 3 August 2014
- Teams: 24 (from 4 confederations)

Final positions
- Champions: Romania (1st title)
- Runners-up: Germany
- Third place: Denmark
- Fourth place: Montenegro

Tournament statistics
- Matches played: 100
- Goals scored: 5,392 (53.92 per match)
- Attendance: 18,735 (187 per match)
- Top scorers: (South Korea) Yu So-jeong (81 goals)

Awards
- Best player: (Germany) Emily Bölk

The 2014 IHF Women's Youth World Championship was the fifth edition of the tournament and took place in Macedonia from 20 July to 3 August 2014.

Romania won the final and their first title by defeating Germany 32–21. Denmark secured the bronze medal after defeating Montenegro 20–19.

== Teams ==
Africa

- Angola
- DR Congo
- Tunisia

Americas

- Argentina
- Brazil
- Paraguay

Asia

- China
- Japan
- Kazakhstan
- South Korea
- Uzbekistan

Europe

- Croatia
- Denmark
- France
- Germany
- Hungary
- North Macedonia
- Montenegro
- Netherlands
- Norway
- Portugal
- Romania
- Russia
- Sweden

Oceania

- No teams qualified

== Preliminary round ==
The schedule was published on 20 June.

All times are local (UTC+2).

=== Group A ===
| Team | Pld | W | D | L | GF | GA | GD | Pts |
|---|---|---|---|---|---|---|---|---|
| South Korea | 5 | 5 | 0 | 0 | 176 | 135 | +41 | 10 |
| Brazil | 5 | 4 | 0 | 1 | 155 | 120 | +35 | 8 |
| Sweden | 5 | 3 | 0 | 2 | 148 | 115 | +33 | 6 |
| Netherlands | 5 | 2 | 0 | 3 | 139 | 118 | +21 | 4 |
| Tunisia | 5 | 1 | 0 | 4 | 97 | 155 | −58 | 2 |
| Kazakhstan | 5 | 0 | 0 | 5 | 108 | 180 | −72 | 0 |

| 20 July 2014; 15:00 | Sweden | 23–24 | Brazil | SRC Kale, Skopje; Attendance: 125; Referees: Konjičanin, Konjičanin (BIH) |
| 20 July 2014; 15:00 | Ekenman-Fernis 10 | (14–13) | Silva 6 | SRC Kale, Skopje; Attendance: 125; Referees: Konjičanin, Konjičanin (BIH) |
| 20 July 2014; 15:00 | 2× (yellow card) 5× (suspension) | Report | 4× (yellow card) 8× (suspension) | SRC Kale, Skopje; Attendance: 125; Referees: Konjičanin, Konjičanin (BIH) |

| 20 July 2014; 17:15 | South Korea | 29–26 | Netherlands | SRC Kale, Skopje; Attendance: 100; Referees: Paolantoni, Zanikian (ARG) |
| 20 July 2014; 17:15 | Kim Seon-geun 9 | (10–12) | Zwinkels, Meijer 5 | SRC Kale, Skopje; Attendance: 100; Referees: Paolantoni, Zanikian (ARG) |
| 20 July 2014; 17:15 | 3× (yellow card) 2× (suspension) | Report | 3× (yellow card) 8× (suspension) | SRC Kale, Skopje; Attendance: 100; Referees: Paolantoni, Zanikian (ARG) |

| 20 July 2014; 19:30 | Kazakhstan | 22–27 | Tunisia | SRC Kale, Skopje; Attendance: 100; Referees: Mykolaitis, Sniurevicius (LTU) |
| 20 July 2014; 19:30 | Khardina, Sharifova 5 | (11–9) | Hachana 7 | SRC Kale, Skopje; Attendance: 100; Referees: Mykolaitis, Sniurevicius (LTU) |
| 20 July 2014; 19:30 | 3× (yellow card) 4× (suspension) | Report | 3× (yellow card) 7× (suspension) | SRC Kale, Skopje; Attendance: 100; Referees: Mykolaitis, Sniurevicius (LTU) |

| 21 July 2014; 15:00 | Brazil | 29–36 | South Korea | SRC Kale, Skopje; Attendance: 80; Referees: Pavićević, Ražnatović (MNE) |
| 21 July 2014; 15:00 | Arruda, Mousinho 7 | (11–21) | Yu So-jeung 7 | SRC Kale, Skopje; Attendance: 80; Referees: Pavićević, Ražnatović (MNE) |
| 21 July 2014; 15:00 | 3× (yellow card) 5× (suspension) | Report | 2× (yellow card) 1× (suspension) | SRC Kale, Skopje; Attendance: 80; Referees: Pavićević, Ražnatović (MNE) |

| 21 July 2014; 17:15 | Tunisia | 11–34 | Sweden | SRC Kale, Skopje; Attendance: 100; Referees: Mykolaitis, Sniurevicius (LTU) |
| 21 July 2014; 17:15 | Farhani 5 | (5–21) | Bardis 8 | SRC Kale, Skopje; Attendance: 100; Referees: Mykolaitis, Sniurevicius (LTU) |
| 21 July 2014; 17:15 | 2× (yellow card) 4× (suspension) | Report | 4× (yellow card) 5× (suspension) | SRC Kale, Skopje; Attendance: 100; Referees: Mykolaitis, Sniurevicius (LTU) |

| 21 July 2014; 19:30 | Netherlands | 37–15 | Kazakhstan | SRC Kale, Skopje; Attendance: 100; Referees: Konjičanin, Konjičanin (BIH) |
| 21 July 2014; 19:30 | Haggerty 6 | (18–3) | Kussaiyn 3 | SRC Kale, Skopje; Attendance: 100; Referees: Konjičanin, Konjičanin (BIH) |
| 21 July 2014; 19:30 | 3× (yellow card) 3× (suspension) | Report | 3× (yellow card) 2× (suspension) | SRC Kale, Skopje; Attendance: 100; Referees: Konjičanin, Konjičanin (BIH) |

| 23 July 2014; 15:00 | Sweden | 30–23 | Netherlands | SRC Kale, Skopje; Attendance: 200; Referees: Pavićević, Ražnatović (MNE) |
| 23 July 2014; 15:00 | Ekenman-Fernis 8 | (11–10) | Amega 10 | SRC Kale, Skopje; Attendance: 200; Referees: Pavićević, Ražnatović (MNE) |
| 23 July 2014; 15:00 | 4× (yellow card) 8× (suspension) | Report | 2× (yellow card) 5× (suspension) | SRC Kale, Skopje; Attendance: 200; Referees: Pavićević, Ražnatović (MNE) |

| 23 July 2014; 17:15 | South Korea | 42–28 | Kazakhstan | SRC Kale, Skopje; Attendance: 100; Referees: Paolantoni, Zanikian (ARG) |
| 23 July 2014; 17:15 | Yu So-jeong 11 | (24–12) | Khardina 8 | SRC Kale, Skopje; Attendance: 100; Referees: Paolantoni, Zanikian (ARG) |
| 23 July 2014; 17:15 | 3× (yellow card) 3× (suspension) | Report | 1× (yellow card) 8× (suspension) | SRC Kale, Skopje; Attendance: 100; Referees: Paolantoni, Zanikian (ARG) |

| 23 July 2014; 19:30 | Brazil | 34–18 | Tunisia | SRC Kale, Skopje; Attendance: 100; Referees: Mykolaitis, Sniurevicius (LTU) |
| 23 July 2014; 19:30 | Paula 7 | (15–7) | Hachana 12 | SRC Kale, Skopje; Attendance: 100; Referees: Mykolaitis, Sniurevicius (LTU) |
| 23 July 2014; 19:30 | 1× (yellow card) 7× (suspension) | Report | 2× (yellow card) 4× (suspension) | SRC Kale, Skopje; Attendance: 100; Referees: Mykolaitis, Sniurevicius (LTU) |

| 24 July 2014; 15:00 | South Korea | 36–26 | Tunisia | SRC Kale, Skopje; Attendance: 100; Referees: Pavićević, Ražnatović (MNE) |
| 24 July 2014; 15:00 | Kim Seon-geun, Yu So-jeong 5 | (24–10) | Hachana 11 | SRC Kale, Skopje; Attendance: 100; Referees: Pavićević, Ražnatović (MNE) |
| 24 July 2014; 15:00 | 2× (yellow card) 2× (suspension) | Report | 2× (yellow card) 4× (suspension) | SRC Kale, Skopje; Attendance: 100; Referees: Pavićević, Ražnatović (MNE) |

| 24 July 2014; 17:15 | Kazakhstan | 24–35 | Sweden | SRC Kale, Skopje; Attendance: 100; Referees: Mykolaitis, Sniurevicius (LTU) |
| 24 July 2014; 17:15 | Khardina 6 | (15–17) | Mellegard 7 | SRC Kale, Skopje; Attendance: 100; Referees: Mykolaitis, Sniurevicius (LTU) |
| 24 July 2014; 17:15 | 2× (yellow card) 4× (suspension) | Report | 3× (yellow card) 5× (suspension) | SRC Kale, Skopje; Attendance: 100; Referees: Mykolaitis, Sniurevicius (LTU) |

| 24 July 2014; 19:30 | Netherlands | 24–29 | Brazil | SRC Kale, Skopje; Attendance: 100; Referees: Konjičanin, Konjičanin (BIH) |
| 24 July 2014; 19:30 | Zwinkels 6 | (13–15) | Carneiro, Silva 7 | SRC Kale, Skopje; Attendance: 100; Referees: Konjičanin, Konjičanin (BIH) |
| 24 July 2014; 19:30 | 2× (yellow card) 3× (suspension) | Report | 2× (yellow card) 7× (suspension) | SRC Kale, Skopje; Attendance: 100; Referees: Konjičanin, Konjičanin (BIH) |

| 26 July 2014; 15:00 | Tunisia | 15–29 | Netherlands | SRC Kale, Skopje; Attendance: 80; Referees: Pavićević, Ražnatović (MNE) |
| 26 July 2014; 15:00 | Dardour 6 | (8–15) | Van Zijl 7 | SRC Kale, Skopje; Attendance: 80; Referees: Pavićević, Ražnatović (MNE) |
| 26 July 2014; 15:00 | 3× (yellow card) 7× (suspension) | Report | 4× (yellow card) 6× (suspension) | SRC Kale, Skopje; Attendance: 80; Referees: Pavićević, Ražnatović (MNE) |

| 26 July 2014; 17:15 | Kazakhstan | 19–39 | Brazil | SRC Kale, Skopje; Attendance: 100; Referees: Paolantoni, Zanikian (ARG) |
| 26 July 2014; 17:15 | Khardina 8 | (6–13) | Silva 7 | SRC Kale, Skopje; Attendance: 100; Referees: Paolantoni, Zanikian (ARG) |
| 26 July 2014; 17:15 | 2× (yellow card) 2× (suspension) | Report | 3× (yellow card) 5× (suspension) | SRC Kale, Skopje; Attendance: 100; Referees: Paolantoni, Zanikian (ARG) |

| 26 July 2014; 19:30 | Sweden | 26–33 | South Korea | SRC Kale, Skopje; Attendance: 140; Referees: Konjičanin, Konjičanin (BIH) |
| 26 July 2014; 19:30 | three players 4 | (11–21) | Yu So-jeong 13 | SRC Kale, Skopje; Attendance: 140; Referees: Konjičanin, Konjičanin (BIH) |
| 26 July 2014; 19:30 | | Report | | SRC Kale, Skopje; Attendance: 140; Referees: Konjičanin, Konjičanin (BIH) |

=== Group B ===
| Team | Pld | W | D | L | GF | GA | GD | Pts |
|---|---|---|---|---|---|---|---|---|
| Hungary | 5 | 5 | 0 | 0 | 154 | 110 | +44 | 10 |
| Russia | 5 | 4 | 0 | 1 | 164 | 111 | +53 | 8 |
| Norway | 5 | 2 | 1 | 2 | 143 | 124 | +19 | 5 |
| Japan | 5 | 2 | 1 | 2 | 154 | 145 | +9 | 5 |
| Paraguay | 5 | 0 | 1 | 4 | 100 | 150 | −50 | 1 |
| DR Congo | 5 | 0 | 1 | 4 | 99 | 174 | −75 | 1 |

| 20 July 2014; 09:30 | Russia | 26–27 | Hungary | Biljanini Izvori Sports Hall, Ohrid; Attendance: 100; Referees: Pétursson, Sigurjónsson (ISL) |
| 20 July 2014; 09:30 | Vernigorova 10 | (11–14) | Horváth, Monori 7 | Biljanini Izvori Sports Hall, Ohrid; Attendance: 100; Referees: Pétursson, Sigurjónsson (ISL) |
| 20 July 2014; 09:30 | 2× (yellow card) 6× (suspension) | Report | 3× (yellow card) 8× (suspension) | Biljanini Izvori Sports Hall, Ohrid; Attendance: 100; Referees: Pétursson, Sigurjónsson (ISL) |

| 20 July 2014; 11:45 | Norway | 37–16 | DR Congo | Biljanini Izvori Sports Hall, Ohrid; Attendance: 100; Referees: Guzmán, Pérez (PUR) |
| 20 July 2014; 11:45 | Hernes 10 | (21–5) | Iwangou 8 | Biljanini Izvori Sports Hall, Ohrid; Attendance: 100; Referees: Guzmán, Pérez (PUR) |
| 20 July 2014; 11:45 | 3× (yellow card) 4× (suspension) | Report | 1× (yellow card) 9× (suspension) 1× (red card) | Biljanini Izvori Sports Hall, Ohrid; Attendance: 100; Referees: Guzmán, Pérez (PUR) |

| 20 July 2014; 14:00 | Japan | 29–25 | Paraguay | Biljanini Izvori Sports Hall, Ohrid; Attendance: 150; Referees: Abid, Chaouch (TUN) |
| 20 July 2014; 14:00 | Fujita 7 | (16–12) | Fernández 9 | Biljanini Izvori Sports Hall, Ohrid; Attendance: 150; Referees: Abid, Chaouch (TUN) |
| 20 July 2014; 14:00 | 3× (yellow card) 4× (suspension) | Report | 2× (yellow card) 4× (suspension) | Biljanini Izvori Sports Hall, Ohrid; Attendance: 150; Referees: Abid, Chaouch (TUN) |

| 21 July 2014; 16:15 | Hungary | 29–22 | Norway | Biljanini Izvori Sports Hall, Ohrid; Attendance: 130; Referees: Lah, Sok (SLO) |
| 21 July 2014; 16:15 | Monori 7 | (12–13) | Hernes 7 | Biljanini Izvori Sports Hall, Ohrid; Attendance: 130; Referees: Lah, Sok (SLO) |
| 21 July 2014; 16:15 | 2× (yellow card) 4× (suspension) | Report | 3× (yellow card) 6× (suspension) | Biljanini Izvori Sports Hall, Ohrid; Attendance: 130; Referees: Lah, Sok (SLO) |

| 21 July 2014; 18:30 | Paraguay | 14–38 | Russia | Biljanini Izvori Sports Hall, Ohrid; Attendance: 100; Referees: Mošorinski, Pandžić (SRB) |
| 21 July 2014; 18:30 | Fiore, Fernández 3 | (7–17) | Suslova, Belikova 5 | Biljanini Izvori Sports Hall, Ohrid; Attendance: 100; Referees: Mošorinski, Pandžić (SRB) |
| 21 July 2014; 18:30 | 2× (yellow card) 6× (suspension) | Report | 2× (yellow card) 7× (suspension) | Biljanini Izvori Sports Hall, Ohrid; Attendance: 100; Referees: Mošorinski, Pandžić (SRB) |

| 21 July 2014; 20:45 | DR Congo | 27–36 | Japan | Biljanini Izvori Sports Hall, Ohrid; Attendance: 100; Referees: Jedermann, Posch (USA) |
| 21 July 2014; 20:45 | Iwangou 9 | (9–19) | Magata 7 | Biljanini Izvori Sports Hall, Ohrid; Attendance: 100; Referees: Jedermann, Posch (USA) |
| 21 July 2014; 20:45 | 2× (yellow card) 4× (suspension) | Report | 2× (yellow card) 2× (suspension) | Biljanini Izvori Sports Hall, Ohrid; Attendance: 100; Referees: Jedermann, Posch (USA) |

| 23 July 2014; 09:30 | Russia | 38–18 | DR Congo | Biljanini Izvori Sports Hall, Ohrid; Attendance: 100; Referees: Abid, Chaouch (TUN) |
| 23 July 2014; 09:30 | Suslova 7 | (17–10) | Hendo 13 | Biljanini Izvori Sports Hall, Ohrid; Attendance: 100; Referees: Abid, Chaouch (TUN) |
| 23 July 2014; 09:30 | 3× (yellow card) 4× (suspension) | Report | 3× (yellow card) 3× (suspension) | Biljanini Izvori Sports Hall, Ohrid; Attendance: 100; Referees: Abid, Chaouch (TUN) |

| 23 July 2014; 11:45 | Norway | 33–33 | Japan | Biljanini Izvori Sports Hall, Ohrid; Attendance: 100; Referees: Mošorinski, Pandžić (SRB) |
| 23 July 2014; 11:45 | Hernes 12 | (15–18) | Kawarabata 9 | Biljanini Izvori Sports Hall, Ohrid; Attendance: 100; Referees: Mošorinski, Pandžić (SRB) |
| 23 July 2014; 11:45 | 3× (yellow card) 3× (suspension) | Report | 3× (yellow card) 3× (suspension) | Biljanini Izvori Sports Hall, Ohrid; Attendance: 100; Referees: Mošorinski, Pandžić (SRB) |

| 23 July 2014; 14:00 | Hungary | 31–21 | Paraguay | Biljanini Izvori Sports Hall, Ohrid; Attendance: 120; Referees: Guzmán, Pérez (PUR) |
| 23 July 2014; 14:00 | three players 5 | (16–8) | Fiore 11 | Biljanini Izvori Sports Hall, Ohrid; Attendance: 120; Referees: Guzmán, Pérez (PUR) |
| 23 July 2014; 14:00 | 3× (yellow card) 7× (suspension) | Report | 1× (yellow card) 7× (suspension) | Biljanini Izvori Sports Hall, Ohrid; Attendance: 120; Referees: Guzmán, Pérez (PUR) |

| 24 July 2014; 16:15 | Norway | 29–17 | Paraguay | Biljanini Izvori Sports Hall, Ohrid; Attendance: 100; Referees: Diop, Faye (SEN) |
| 24 July 2014; 16:15 | Rønning 7 | (17–8) | Sosa 6 | Biljanini Izvori Sports Hall, Ohrid; Attendance: 100; Referees: Diop, Faye (SEN) |
| 24 July 2014; 16:15 | 3× (yellow card) 7× (suspension) | Report | 7× (suspension) | Biljanini Izvori Sports Hall, Ohrid; Attendance: 100; Referees: Diop, Faye (SEN) |

| 24 July 2014; 18:30 | Japan | 30–33 | Russia | Biljanini Izvori Sports Hall, Ohrid; Attendance: 300; Referees: Jedermann, Posch (USA) |
| 24 July 2014; 18:30 | Kawarabata 7 | (16–17) | Vernigorova 8 | Biljanini Izvori Sports Hall, Ohrid; Attendance: 300; Referees: Jedermann, Posch (USA) |
| 24 July 2014; 18:30 | 3× (yellow card) 1× (suspension) | Report | 2× (yellow card) 4× (suspension) | Biljanini Izvori Sports Hall, Ohrid; Attendance: 300; Referees: Jedermann, Posch (USA) |

| 24 July 2014; 20:45 | DR Congo | 15–40 | Hungary | Biljanini Izvori Sports Hall, Ohrid; Attendance: 100; Referees: Pétursson, Sigurjónsson (ISL) |
| 24 July 2014; 20:45 | Badiata 4 | (7–21) | Kiss, Diószegi 8 | Biljanini Izvori Sports Hall, Ohrid; Attendance: 100; Referees: Pétursson, Sigurjónsson (ISL) |
| 24 July 2014; 20:45 | 3× (yellow card) 12× (suspension) 1× (red card) | Report | 3× (yellow card) 3× (suspension) | Biljanini Izvori Sports Hall, Ohrid; Attendance: 100; Referees: Pétursson, Sigurjónsson (ISL) |

| 26 July 2014; 09:30 | Paraguay | 23–23 | DR Congo | Biljanini Izvori Sports Hall, Ohrid; Attendance: 100; Referees: Diop, Faye (SEN) |
| 26 July 2014; 09:30 | Fiore 7 | (14–13) | Hendo 9 | Biljanini Izvori Sports Hall, Ohrid; Attendance: 100; Referees: Diop, Faye (SEN) |
| 26 July 2014; 09:30 | 3× (yellow card) 4× (suspension) | Report | 3× (yellow card) 6× (suspension) | Biljanini Izvori Sports Hall, Ohrid; Attendance: 100; Referees: Diop, Faye (SEN) |

| 26 July 2014; 11:45 | Japan | 26–27 | Hungary | Biljanini Izvori Sports Hall, Ohrid; Attendance: 100; Referees: Covalciuc, Covalciuc (MDA) |
| 26 July 2014; 11:45 | Kawarabata 6 | (10–14) | Monori 6 | Biljanini Izvori Sports Hall, Ohrid; Attendance: 100; Referees: Covalciuc, Covalciuc (MDA) |
| 26 July 2014; 11:45 | 3× (yellow card) 2× (suspension) | Report | 2× (yellow card) 4× (suspension) | Biljanini Izvori Sports Hall, Ohrid; Attendance: 100; Referees: Covalciuc, Covalciuc (MDA) |

| 26 July 2014; 14:00 | Russia | 29–22 | Norway | Biljanini Izvori Sports Hall, Ohrid; Attendance: 120; Referees: Mošorinski, Pandžić (SRB) |
| 26 July 2014; 14:00 | Malashenko 7 | (13–13) | Hernes 9 | Biljanini Izvori Sports Hall, Ohrid; Attendance: 120; Referees: Mošorinski, Pandžić (SRB) |
| 26 July 2014; 14:00 | 2× (yellow card) 6× (suspension) | Report | 3× (yellow card) 4× (suspension) | Biljanini Izvori Sports Hall, Ohrid; Attendance: 120; Referees: Mošorinski, Pandžić (SRB) |

=== Group C ===
| Team | Pld | W | D | L | GF | GA | GD | Pts |
|---|---|---|---|---|---|---|---|---|
| Denmark | 5 | 4 | 1 | 0 | 195 | 108 | +87 | 9 |
| Romania | 5 | 4 | 1 | 0 | 170 | 120 | +50 | 9 |
| Germany | 5 | 3 | 0 | 2 | 155 | 112 | +43 | 6 |
| Argentina | 5 | 2 | 0 | 3 | 113 | 160 | −47 | 4 |
| North Macedonia | 5 | 1 | 0 | 4 | 119 | 151 | −32 | 2 |
| Uzbekistan | 5 | 0 | 0 | 5 | 117 | 218 | −101 | 0 |

| 20 July 2014; 15:00 | Denmark | 60–18 | Uzbekistan | Sportska Sala-ABA, Strumica; Attendance: 100; Referees: Alpaizde, Berezkina (RUS) |
| 20 July 2014; 15:00 | Pedersen 9 | (24–8) | Abdulhamidova 9 | Sportska Sala-ABA, Strumica; Attendance: 100; Referees: Alpaizde, Berezkina (RUS) |
| 20 July 2014; 15:00 | 3× (yellow card) 3× (suspension) | Report | 2× (yellow card) 3× (suspension) | Sportska Sala-ABA, Strumica; Attendance: 100; Referees: Alpaizde, Berezkina (RUS) |

| 20 July 2014; 17:15 | Romania | 34–20 | Argentina | Sportska Sala-ABA, Strumica; Attendance: 100; Referees: Muya, Sangwani (COD) |
| 20 July 2014; 17:15 | Bazaliu 6 | (16–9) | Casasola 6 | Sportska Sala-ABA, Strumica; Attendance: 100; Referees: Muya, Sangwani (COD) |
| 20 July 2014; 17:15 | 3× (yellow card) 3× (suspension) | Report | 4× (yellow card) 3× (suspension) | Sportska Sala-ABA, Strumica; Attendance: 100; Referees: Muya, Sangwani (COD) |

| 20 July 2014; 19:30 | North Macedonia | 20–24 | Germany | Sportska Sala-ABA, Strumica; Attendance: 900; Referees: Allade, Dagba (BEN) |
| 20 July 2014; 19:30 | Ristovska 7 | (8–9) | Bölk 6 | Sportska Sala-ABA, Strumica; Attendance: 900; Referees: Allade, Dagba (BEN) |
| 20 July 2014; 19:30 | 4× (yellow card) 4× (suspension) | Report | 3× (yellow card) 5× (suspension) | Sportska Sala-ABA, Strumica; Attendance: 900; Referees: Allade, Dagba (BEN) |

| 22 July 2014; 15:00 | Uzbekistan | 22–42 | Romania | Sportska Sala-ABA, Strumica; Attendance: 100; Referees: Allade, Dagba (BEN) |
| 22 July 2014; 15:00 | Abdulhamidova 11 | (10–19) | Ilie 12 | Sportska Sala-ABA, Strumica; Attendance: 100; Referees: Allade, Dagba (BEN) |
| 22 July 2014; 15:00 | 2× (yellow card) 4× (suspension) | Report | 3× (yellow card) 2× (suspension) | Sportska Sala-ABA, Strumica; Attendance: 100; Referees: Allade, Dagba (BEN) |

| 22 July 2014; 17:15 | Germany | 24–28 | Denmark | Sportska Sala-ABA, Strumica; Attendance: 200; Referees: Mata, López (ESP) |
| 22 July 2014; 17:15 | Ingenpaß, Bölk 5 | (11–14) | Kristiansen 8 | Sportska Sala-ABA, Strumica; Attendance: 200; Referees: Mata, López (ESP) |
| 22 July 2014; 17:15 | 3× (yellow card) 3× (suspension) | Report | 4× (yellow card) 5× (suspension) | Sportska Sala-ABA, Strumica; Attendance: 200; Referees: Mata, López (ESP) |

| 22 July 2014; 19:30 | Argentina | 24–22 | North Macedonia | Sportska Sala-ABA, Strumica; Attendance: 600; Referees: Alpaizde, Berezkina (RUS) |
| 22 July 2014; 19:30 | Casasola 8 | (14–13) | Ristovska 6 | Sportska Sala-ABA, Strumica; Attendance: 600; Referees: Alpaizde, Berezkina (RUS) |
| 22 July 2014; 19:30 | 2× (yellow card) 7× (suspension) | Report | 3× (yellow card) 5× (suspension) | Sportska Sala-ABA, Strumica; Attendance: 600; Referees: Alpaizde, Berezkina (RUS) |

| 23 July 2014; 15:00 | Denmark | 39–18 | Argentina | Sportska Sala-ABA, Strumica; Attendance: 50; Referees: Allada, Dagba (BEN) |
| 23 July 2014; 15:00 | Johansen, Hald 7 | (21–12) | Carletti 5 | Sportska Sala-ABA, Strumica; Attendance: 50; Referees: Allada, Dagba (BEN) |
| 23 July 2014; 15:00 | 3× (yellow card) 1× (suspension) | Report | 3× (yellow card) 1× (suspension) | Sportska Sala-ABA, Strumica; Attendance: 50; Referees: Allada, Dagba (BEN) |

| 23 July 2014; 17:15 | Romania | 37–23 | North Macedonia | Sportska Sala-ABA, Strumica; Attendance: 400; Referees: Mata, López (ESP) |
| 23 July 2014; 17:15 | Bazaliu 10 | (17–12) | Keramichieva 7 | Sportska Sala-ABA, Strumica; Attendance: 400; Referees: Mata, López (ESP) |
| 23 July 2014; 17:15 | 3× (yellow card) 5× (suspension) | Report | 3× (yellow card) 2× (suspension) | Sportska Sala-ABA, Strumica; Attendance: 400; Referees: Mata, López (ESP) |

| 23 July 2014; 19:30 | Uzbekistan | 21–45 | Germany | Sportska Sala-ABA, Strumica; Attendance: 300; Referees: Alpaizde, Berezkina (RUS) |
| 23 July 2014; 19:30 | Allayrova 9 | (9–25) | four players 6 | Sportska Sala-ABA, Strumica; Attendance: 300; Referees: Alpaizde, Berezkina (RUS) |
| 23 July 2014; 19:30 | 2× (yellow card) 6× (suspension) | Report | 3× (yellow card) 5× (suspension) | Sportska Sala-ABA, Strumica; Attendance: 300; Referees: Alpaizde, Berezkina (RUS) |

| 25 July 2014; 15:00 | Romania | 27–25 | Germany | Sportska Sala-ABA, Strumica; Attendance: 200; Referees: Mata, López (ESP) |
| 25 July 2014; 15:00 | Bazaliu 8 | (14–11) | Sturm 6 | Sportska Sala-ABA, Strumica; Attendance: 200; Referees: Mata, López (ESP) |
| 25 July 2014; 15:00 | 3× (yellow card) 4× (suspension) | Report | 3× (yellow card) 2× (suspension) | Sportska Sala-ABA, Strumica; Attendance: 200; Referees: Mata, López (ESP) |

| 25 July 2014; 17:15 | North Macedonia | 18–38 | Denmark | Sportska Sala-ABA, Strumica; Attendance: 400; Referees: Alpazde, Berezkina (RUS) |
| 25 July 2014; 17:15 | Keramichieva 4 | (10–19) | Kristiansen 8 | Sportska Sala-ABA, Strumica; Attendance: 400; Referees: Alpazde, Berezkina (RUS) |
| 25 July 2014; 17:15 | 4× (yellow card) 4× (suspension) 1× (red card) | Report | 3× (yellow card) 3× (suspension) | Sportska Sala-ABA, Strumica; Attendance: 400; Referees: Alpazde, Berezkina (RUS) |

| 25 July 2014; 19:30 | Argentina | 35–28 | Uzbekistan | Sportska Sala-ABA, Strumica; Attendance: 100; Referees: Allada, Dagba (BEN) |
| 25 July 2014; 19:30 | Lacazette 8 | (17–15) | Burieva 13 | Sportska Sala-ABA, Strumica; Attendance: 100; Referees: Allada, Dagba (BEN) |
| 25 July 2014; 19:30 | 3× (yellow card) 1× (suspension) | Report | 3× (yellow card) 3× (suspension) | Sportska Sala-ABA, Strumica; Attendance: 100; Referees: Allada, Dagba (BEN) |

| 26 July 2014; 15:00 | Germany | 37–16 | Argentina | Sportska Sala-ABA, Strumica; Attendance: 200; Referees: Alpazde, Berezkina (RUS) |
| 26 July 2014; 15:00 | Ingenpaß 6 | (15–10) | Carletti 5 | Sportska Sala-ABA, Strumica; Attendance: 200; Referees: Alpazde, Berezkina (RUS) |
| 26 July 2014; 15:00 | 2× (yellow card) 4× (suspension) | Report | 3× (suspension) | Sportska Sala-ABA, Strumica; Attendance: 200; Referees: Alpazde, Berezkina (RUS) |

| 26 July 2014; 17:15 | North Macedonia | 36–28 | Uzbekistan | Sportska Sala-ABA, Strumica; Attendance: 400; Referees: Allada, Dagba (BEN) |
| 26 July 2014; 17:15 | Ristovska 12 | (17–13) | Burieva 9 | Sportska Sala-ABA, Strumica; Attendance: 400; Referees: Allada, Dagba (BEN) |
| 26 July 2014; 17:15 | 3× (yellow card) 3× (suspension) | Report | 2× (yellow card) 5× (suspension) | Sportska Sala-ABA, Strumica; Attendance: 400; Referees: Allada, Dagba (BEN) |

| 26 July 2014; 19:30 | Denmark | 30–30 | Romania | Sportska Sala-ABA, Strumica; Attendance: 200; Referees: Mata, López (ESP) |
| 26 July 2014; 19:30 | Højlund 9 | (13–14) | Bazaliu 9 | Sportska Sala-ABA, Strumica; Attendance: 200; Referees: Mata, López (ESP) |
| 26 July 2014; 19:30 | 3× (yellow card) 2× (suspension) | Report | 2× (yellow card) 3× (suspension) | Sportska Sala-ABA, Strumica; Attendance: 200; Referees: Mata, López (ESP) |

=== Group D ===
| Team | Pld | W | D | L | GF | GA | GD | Pts |
|---|---|---|---|---|---|---|---|---|
| Montenegro | 5 | 5 | 0 | 0 | 134 | 89 | +45 | 10 |
| Portugal | 5 | 4 | 0 | 1 | 124 | 107 | +17 | 8 |
| Croatia | 5 | 3 | 0 | 2 | 107 | 117 | −10 | 6 |
| France | 5 | 2 | 0 | 3 | 118 | 119 | −1 | 4 |
| Angola | 5 | 1 | 0 | 4 | 120 | 129 | −9 | 2 |
| China | 5 | 0 | 0 | 5 | 93 | 135 | −42 | 0 |

| 20 July 2014; 16:15 | Portugal | 33–28 | Angola | Biljanini Izvori Sports Hall, Ohrid; Attendance: 120; Referees: Covalciuc, Covalciuc (MDA) |
| 20 July 2014; 16:15 | Rodrigues 9 | (17–10) | Caluyombo 7 | Biljanini Izvori Sports Hall, Ohrid; Attendance: 120; Referees: Covalciuc, Covalciuc (MDA) |
| 20 July 2014; 16:15 | 3× (yellow card) 4× (suspension) | Report | 3× (yellow card) 2× (suspension) | Biljanini Izvori Sports Hall, Ohrid; Attendance: 120; Referees: Covalciuc, Covalciuc (MDA) |

| 20 July 2014; 18:30 | Montenegro | 28–23 | France | Biljanini Izvori Sports Hall, Ohrid; Attendance: 100; Referees: Lah, Sok (SLO) |
| 20 July 2014; 18:30 | Jauković 7 | (12–10) | Sylla 7 | Biljanini Izvori Sports Hall, Ohrid; Attendance: 100; Referees: Lah, Sok (SLO) |
| 20 July 2014; 18:30 | 3× (yellow card) 6× (suspension) | Report | 3× (yellow card) 2× (suspension) | Biljanini Izvori Sports Hall, Ohrid; Attendance: 100; Referees: Lah, Sok (SLO) |

| 20 July 2014; 20:45 | Croatia | 22–17 | China | Biljanini Izvori Sports Hall, Ohrid; Attendance: 100; Referees: Diop, Faye (SEN) |
| 20 July 2014; 20:45 | Zadravec 4 | (7−8) | Lin Yan Qun 6 | Biljanini Izvori Sports Hall, Ohrid; Attendance: 100; Referees: Diop, Faye (SEN) |
| 20 July 2014; 20:45 | 3× (yellow card) 4× (suspension) | Report | 2× (yellow card) 3× (suspension) | Biljanini Izvori Sports Hall, Ohrid; Attendance: 100; Referees: Diop, Faye (SEN) |

| 22 July 2014; 16:15 | Angola | 17−22 | Montenegro | Biljanini Izvori Sports Hall, Ohrid; Attendance: 100; Referees: Jedermann, Posch (USA) |
| 22 July 2014; 16:15 | four players 3 | (9−13) | Agović 5 | Biljanini Izvori Sports Hall, Ohrid; Attendance: 100; Referees: Jedermann, Posch (USA) |
| 22 July 2014; 16:15 | 2× (yellow card) | Report | 2× (yellow card) 5× (suspension) | Biljanini Izvori Sports Hall, Ohrid; Attendance: 100; Referees: Jedermann, Posch (USA) |

| 22 July 2014; 18:30 | China | 15−27 | Portugal | Biljanini Izvori Sports Hall, Ohrid; Attendance: 100; Referees: Guzmán, Pérez (PUR) |
| 22 July 2014; 18:30 | Suo Shan Shan 4 | (7−15) | Rodrigues 6 | Biljanini Izvori Sports Hall, Ohrid; Attendance: 100; Referees: Guzmán, Pérez (PUR) |
| 22 July 2014; 18:30 | 2× (yellow card) 7× (suspension) | Report | 2× (yellow card) 5× (suspension) | Biljanini Izvori Sports Hall, Ohrid; Attendance: 100; Referees: Guzmán, Pérez (PUR) |

| 22 July 2014; 20:45 | France | 16−23 | Croatia | Biljanini Izvori Sports Hall, Ohrid; Attendance: 200; Referees: Pétursson, Sigurjónsson (ISL) |
| 22 July 2014; 20:45 | Sajka 4 | (8−8) | Senvald 8 | Biljanini Izvori Sports Hall, Ohrid; Attendance: 200; Referees: Pétursson, Sigurjónsson (ISL) |
| 22 July 2014; 20:45 | 2× (yellow card) 4× (suspension) | Report | 2× (yellow card) 7× (suspension) | Biljanini Izvori Sports Hall, Ohrid; Attendance: 200; Referees: Pétursson, Sigurjónsson (ISL) |

| 23 July 2014; 16:15 | Portugal | 21−17 | France | Biljanini Izvori Sports Hall, Ohrid; Attendance: 100; Referees: Diop, Faye (SEN) |
| 23 July 2014; 16:15 | Santiago 13 | (10−4) | Takamoud, Plazanet 4 | Biljanini Izvori Sports Hall, Ohrid; Attendance: 100; Referees: Diop, Faye (SEN) |
| 23 July 2014; 16:15 | 3× (yellow card) 3× (suspension) | Report | 2× (yellow card) 3× (suspension) | Biljanini Izvori Sports Hall, Ohrid; Attendance: 100; Referees: Diop, Faye (SEN) |

| 23 July 2014; 18:30 | Montenegro | 31–21 | Croatia | Biljanini Izvori Sports Hall, Ohrid; Attendance: 400; Referees: Covalciuc, Covalciuc (MDA) |
| 23 July 2014; 18:30 | Malović 9 | (13–12) | Zadravec 7 | Biljanini Izvori Sports Hall, Ohrid; Attendance: 400; Referees: Covalciuc, Covalciuc (MDA) |
| 23 July 2014; 18:30 | 4× (yellow card) 7× (suspension) | Report | 3× (yellow card) 4× (suspension) | Biljanini Izvori Sports Hall, Ohrid; Attendance: 400; Referees: Covalciuc, Covalciuc (MDA) |

| 23 July 2014; 20:45 | Angola | 31–20 | China | Biljanini Izvori Sports Hall, Ohrid; Attendance: 100; Referees: Lah, Sok (SLO) |
| 23 July 2014; 20:45 | Nenganga 7 | (16–10) | Lin Yan Qun 5 | Biljanini Izvori Sports Hall, Ohrid; Attendance: 100; Referees: Lah, Sok (SLO) |
| 23 July 2014; 20:45 | 1× (yellow card) 3× (suspension) | Report | 3× (yellow card) 3× (suspension) | Biljanini Izvori Sports Hall, Ohrid; Attendance: 100; Referees: Lah, Sok (SLO) |

| 25 July 2014; 16:15 | Montenegro | 24–17 | China | Biljanini Izvori Sports Hall, Ohrid; Attendance: 100; Referees: Abid, Chaouch (TUN) |
| 25 July 2014; 16:15 | Jauković 4 | (15–8) | Zhang Chun Jin, Lin Yan Qun 4 | Biljanini Izvori Sports Hall, Ohrid; Attendance: 100; Referees: Abid, Chaouch (TUN) |
| 25 July 2014; 16:15 | 3× (yellow card) 3× (suspension) | Report | 3× (yellow card) 1× (suspension) | Biljanini Izvori Sports Hall, Ohrid; Attendance: 100; Referees: Abid, Chaouch (TUN) |

| 25 July 2014; 18:30 | Croatia | 18–32 | Portugal | Biljanini Izvori Sports Hall, Ohrid; Attendance: 150; Referees: Pétursson, Sigurjónsson (ISL) |
| 25 July 2014; 18:30 | Senvald 6 | (8–14) | Rodrigues 8 | Biljanini Izvori Sports Hall, Ohrid; Attendance: 150; Referees: Pétursson, Sigurjónsson (ISL) |
| 25 July 2014; 18:30 | 3× (yellow card) 9× (suspension) | Report | 3× (yellow card) 8× (suspension) | Biljanini Izvori Sports Hall, Ohrid; Attendance: 150; Referees: Pétursson, Sigurjónsson (ISL) |

| 25 July 2014; 20:45 | France | 31–23 | Angola | Biljanini Izvori Sports Hall, Ohrid; Attendance: 100; Referees: Mošorinski, Pandžić (SRB) |
| 25 July 2014; 20:45 | Sajka 6 | (13–11) | Paulino 7 | Biljanini Izvori Sports Hall, Ohrid; Attendance: 100; Referees: Mošorinski, Pandžić (SRB) |
| 25 July 2014; 20:45 | 3× (yellow card) 2× (suspension) | Report | 3× (yellow card) 1× (suspension) | Biljanini Izvori Sports Hall, Ohrid; Attendance: 100; Referees: Mošorinski, Pandžić (SRB) |

| 26 July 2014; 16:15 | China | 24–31 | France | Biljanini Izvori Sports Hall, Ohrid; Attendance: 100; Referees: Guzmán, Pérez (PUR) |
| 26 July 2014; 16:15 | Zhang Ting Ting 8 | (8–18) | Lepere 5 | Biljanini Izvori Sports Hall, Ohrid; Attendance: 100; Referees: Guzmán, Pérez (PUR) |
| 26 July 2014; 16:15 | 1× (yellow card) 10× (suspension) | Report | 3× (yellow card) 4× (suspension) | Biljanini Izvori Sports Hall, Ohrid; Attendance: 100; Referees: Guzmán, Pérez (PUR) |

| 26 July 2014; 18:30 | Croatia | 23–21 | Angola | Biljanini Izvori Sports Hall, Ohrid; Attendance: 100; Referees: Jedermann, Posch (USA) |
| 26 July 2014; 18:30 | Ljubičić 5 | (15–8) | Paulino 8 | Biljanini Izvori Sports Hall, Ohrid; Attendance: 100; Referees: Jedermann, Posch (USA) |
| 26 July 2014; 18:30 | 3× (yellow card) 4× (suspension) | Report | 2× (yellow card) 3× (suspension) | Biljanini Izvori Sports Hall, Ohrid; Attendance: 100; Referees: Jedermann, Posch (USA) |

| 26 July 2014; 20:45 | Portugal | 11–29 | Montenegro | Biljanini Izvori Sports Hall, Ohrid; Attendance: 400; Referees: Lah, Sok (SLO) |
| 26 July 2014; 20:45 | Rodrigues, Santiago 3 | (6–13) | Jauković 7 | Biljanini Izvori Sports Hall, Ohrid; Attendance: 400; Referees: Lah, Sok (SLO) |
| 26 July 2014; 20:45 | 3× (yellow card) 6× (suspension) | Report | 3× (yellow card) 5× (suspension) | Biljanini Izvori Sports Hall, Ohrid; Attendance: 400; Referees: Lah, Sok (SLO) |

== Knockout stage ==
=== Championship ===
Round of 16
B1 | Hungary | 21
A4 | Netherlands | 22
D3 | Croatia | 22
C2 | Romania | 28
B3 | Norway | 26
A2 | Brazil | 29
D1 | Montenegro | 31
C4 | Argentina | 22
C3 | Germany (pen.) | 40
D2 | Portugal | 39
A1 | South Korea | 42
B4 | Japan | 34
A3 | Sweden | 21
B2 | Russia | 25
C1 | Denmark | 33
D4 | France | 22

Quarterfinals
A4 | Netherlands | 22
C2 | Romania | 36
A2 | Brazil | 24
D1 | Montenegro | 25
C3 | Germany | 35
A1 | South Korea | 29
B2 | Russia | 26
C1 | Denmark (ET) | 29

Semifinals
C2 | Romania | 28
D1 | Montenegro | 25
C3 | Germany | 26
C1 | Denmark | 24

Final
C2 | Romania | 32
C3 | Germany | 21
Third place
D1 | Montenegro | 19
C1 | Denmark | 20

==== Eighthfinals ====
| 28 July 2014; 14:00 | Hungary | 21–22 | Netherlands | Biljanini Izvori Sports Hall, Ohrid; Attendance: 120; Referees: Jedermann, Posch (USA) |
| 28 July 2014; 14:00 | Horváth, Monori 5 | (12–11) | Van Zijl, Amega 6 | Biljanini Izvori Sports Hall, Ohrid; Attendance: 120; Referees: Jedermann, Posch (USA) |
| 28 July 2014; 14:00 | 3× (yellow card) 2× (suspension) | Report | 2× (yellow card) 6× (suspension) | Biljanini Izvori Sports Hall, Ohrid; Attendance: 120; Referees: Jedermann, Posch (USA) |

28 July 2014
14:00
Germany
40–39 (ET)
Portugal
Sportska Sala-ABA, Strumica
Attendance: 200
Referees: Pavićević, Ražnatović (MNE)
Bölk 22
(12–11)
Rodrigues 17
4× (yellow card) 6× (suspension)
Report
3× (yellow card) 5× (suspension) 1× (red card)

FT: 28–28 ET: 5–5, 3–3

Germany won the shootout 4–3.

| 28 July 2014; 16:15 | Sweden | 21–25 | Russia | Biljanini Izvori Sports Hall, Ohrid; Attendance: 300; Referees: Pétursson, Sigurjónsson (ISL) |
| 28 July 2014; 16:15 | Ekenman-Fernis 7 | (9–17) | Malashenko 7 | Biljanini Izvori Sports Hall, Ohrid; Attendance: 300; Referees: Pétursson, Sigurjónsson (ISL) |
| 28 July 2014; 16:15 | 4× (yellow card) 3× (suspension) | Report | 3× (yellow card) 10× (suspension) | Biljanini Izvori Sports Hall, Ohrid; Attendance: 300; Referees: Pétursson, Sigurjónsson (ISL) |

| 28 July 2014; 16:15 | Montenegro | 31–22 | Argentina | Sportska Sala-ABA, Strumica; Attendance: 200; Referees: Konjičanin, Konjičanin (BIH) |
| 28 July 2014; 16:15 | Agović 7 | (13–8) | Gavilan 8 | Sportska Sala-ABA, Strumica; Attendance: 200; Referees: Konjičanin, Konjičanin (BIH) |
| 28 July 2014; 16:15 | 3× (yellow card) 6× (suspension) | Report | 3× (yellow card) 2× (suspension) | Sportska Sala-ABA, Strumica; Attendance: 200; Referees: Konjičanin, Konjičanin (BIH) |

| 28 July 2014; 18:30 | Norway | 26–29 | Brazil | Biljanini Izvori Sports Hall, Ohrid; Attendance: 150; Referees: Covalciuc, Covalciuc (MDA) |
| 28 July 2014; 18:30 | Hernes 9 | (12–16) | Paula 8 | Biljanini Izvori Sports Hall, Ohrid; Attendance: 150; Referees: Covalciuc, Covalciuc (MDA) |
| 28 July 2014; 18:30 | 3× (yellow card) | Report | 3× (yellow card) 3× (suspension) | Biljanini Izvori Sports Hall, Ohrid; Attendance: 150; Referees: Covalciuc, Covalciuc (MDA) |

| 28 July 2014; 18:30 | Croatia | 22–28 | Romania | Sportska Sala-ABA, Strumica; Attendance: 300; Referees: Mykolaitis, Sniurevicius (LTU) |
| 28 July 2014; 18:30 | Zadravec 6 | (12–12) | Bazaliu 8 | Sportska Sala-ABA, Strumica; Attendance: 300; Referees: Mykolaitis, Sniurevicius (LTU) |
| 28 July 2014; 18:30 | 3× (yellow card) 4× (suspension) | Report | 3× (yellow card) 2× (suspension) | Sportska Sala-ABA, Strumica; Attendance: 300; Referees: Mykolaitis, Sniurevicius (LTU) |

| 28 July 2014; 20:45 | South Korea | 42–34 | Japan | Biljanini Izvori Sports Hall, Ohrid; Attendance: 200; Referees: Mošorinski, Pandžić (SRB) |
| 28 July 2014; 20:45 | Yu So-jeong 12 | (22–12) | Tani 9 | Biljanini Izvori Sports Hall, Ohrid; Attendance: 200; Referees: Mošorinski, Pandžić (SRB) |
| 28 July 2014; 20:45 | 3× (yellow card) 5× (suspension) | Report | 3× (yellow card) 2× (suspension) | Biljanini Izvori Sports Hall, Ohrid; Attendance: 200; Referees: Mošorinski, Pandžić (SRB) |

| 28 July 2014; 20:45 | Denmark | 33–22 | France | Sportska Sala-ABA, Strumica; Attendance: 300; Referees: Mata, López (ESP) |
| 28 July 2014; 20:45 | Kristiansen, Mikkelsen 6 | (17–14) | Mandret, Kieffer 6 | Sportska Sala-ABA, Strumica; Attendance: 300; Referees: Mata, López (ESP) |
| 28 July 2014; 20:45 | 3× (yellow card) 3× (suspension) | Report | 3× (yellow card) 5× (suspension) | Sportska Sala-ABA, Strumica; Attendance: 300; Referees: Mata, López (ESP) |

==== Quarterfinals ====
| 30 July 2014; 12:00 | Netherlands | 22–36 | Romania | Biljanini Izvori Sports Hall, Ohrid; Attendance: 150; Referees: Covalciuc, Covalciuc (MDA) |
| 30 July 2014; 12:00 | Noordink 5 | (12–22) | Bazaliu 12 | Biljanini Izvori Sports Hall, Ohrid; Attendance: 150; Referees: Covalciuc, Covalciuc (MDA) |
| 30 July 2014; 12:00 | 2× (yellow card) 6× (suspension) | Report | 3× (yellow card) 12× (suspension) | Biljanini Izvori Sports Hall, Ohrid; Attendance: 150; Referees: Covalciuc, Covalciuc (MDA) |

| 30 July 2014; 14:30 | Brazil | 24–25 | Montenegro | Biljanini Izvori Sports Hall, Ohrid; Attendance: 300; Referees: Mata, López (ESP) |
| 30 July 2014; 14:30 | Arruda 8 | (10–11) | Jauković 9 | Biljanini Izvori Sports Hall, Ohrid; Attendance: 300; Referees: Mata, López (ESP) |
| 30 July 2014; 14:30 | 3× (yellow card) 2× (suspension) | Report | 3× (yellow card) 2× (suspension) | Biljanini Izvori Sports Hall, Ohrid; Attendance: 300; Referees: Mata, López (ESP) |

| 30 July 2014; 17:00 | Germany | 35–29 | South Korea | Biljanini Izvori Sports Hall, Ohrid; Attendance: 300; Referees: Konjičanin, Konjičanin (BIH) |
| 30 July 2014; 17:00 | Bölk 11 | (19–15) | Yu So-jeong 12 | Biljanini Izvori Sports Hall, Ohrid; Attendance: 300; Referees: Konjičanin, Konjičanin (BIH) |
| 30 July 2014; 17:00 | 1× (yellow card) 3× (suspension) | Report | 3× (yellow card) 2× (suspension) | Biljanini Izvori Sports Hall, Ohrid; Attendance: 300; Referees: Konjičanin, Konjičanin (BIH) |

30 July 2014
19:30
Russia
26–29 (ET)
Denmark
Biljanini Izvori Sports Hall, Ohrid
Attendance: 300
Referees: Lah, Sok (SLO)
Golikova 9
(11–10)
three players 5
3× (yellow card) 6× (suspension) 1× (red card)
Report
4× (yellow card) 4× (suspension)

FT: 22–22 ET: 4–7

==== Semifinals ====
| 1 August 2014; 17:00 | Romania | 28–25 | Montenegro | Biljanini Izvori Sports Hall, Ohrid; Attendance: 350; Referees: Pétursson, Sigurjónsson (ISL) |
| 1 August 2014; 17:00 | Laslo 10 | (12–13) | Jauković 12 | Biljanini Izvori Sports Hall, Ohrid; Attendance: 350; Referees: Pétursson, Sigurjónsson (ISL) |
| 1 August 2014; 17:00 | 4× (yellow card) 3× (suspension) | Report | 3× (yellow card) 5× (suspension) | Biljanini Izvori Sports Hall, Ohrid; Attendance: 350; Referees: Pétursson, Sigurjónsson (ISL) |

| 1 August 2014; 19:30 | Germany | 26–24 | Denmark | Biljanini Izvori Sports Hall, Ohrid; Attendance: 600; Referees: Mošorinski, Pandžić (SRB) |
| 1 August 2014; 19:30 | Bölk 7 | (10–10) | Boegelund, Kristiansen 5 | Biljanini Izvori Sports Hall, Ohrid; Attendance: 600; Referees: Mošorinski, Pandžić (SRB) |
| 1 August 2014; 19:30 | 2× (yellow card) 4× (suspension) | Report | 3× (yellow card) 5× (suspension) | Biljanini Izvori Sports Hall, Ohrid; Attendance: 600; Referees: Mošorinski, Pandžić (SRB) |

==== Bronze medal game ====
| 3 August 2014; 14:30 | Montenegro | 19–20 | Denmark | Biljanini Izvori Sports Hall, Ohrid; Attendance: 500; Referees: Lah, Sok (SLO) |
| 3 August 2014; 14:30 | Jauković 7 | (13–8) | Nielsen 7 | Biljanini Izvori Sports Hall, Ohrid; Attendance: 500; Referees: Lah, Sok (SLO) |
| 3 August 2014; 14:30 | 3× (yellow card) 2× (suspension) | Report | 3× (yellow card) 4× (suspension) | Biljanini Izvori Sports Hall, Ohrid; Attendance: 500; Referees: Lah, Sok (SLO) |

==== Final ====
| 3 August 2014; 17:00 | Romania | 32–21 | Germany | Biljanini Izvori Sports Hall, Ohrid; Attendance: 1,000; Referees: Mata, López (ESP) |
| 3 August 2014; 17:00 | Bazaliu 10 | (15–7) | Bölk 5 | Biljanini Izvori Sports Hall, Ohrid; Attendance: 1,000; Referees: Mata, López (ESP) |
| 3 August 2014; 17:00 | 3× (yellow card) 3× (suspension) | Report | 3× (yellow card) 3× (suspension) | Biljanini Izvori Sports Hall, Ohrid; Attendance: 1,000; Referees: Mata, López (ESP) |

=== 5–8th place playoffs ===
Semifinals
1 August
Netherlands | 30
Brazil | 27
1 August
South Korea | 28
Russia | 26

Fifth place
3 August
Netherlands | 27
South Korea | 33
Seventh place
3 August
Brazil | 34
Russia | 31

==== 5–8th place semifinals ====
| 1 August 2014; 12:15 | Netherlands | 30–27 | Brazil | Biljanini Izvori Sports Hall, Ohrid; Attendance: 100; Referees: Konjičanin, Konjičanin (BIH) |
| 1 August 2014; 12:15 | Amega 8 | (12–13) | Paula, Costa 5 | Biljanini Izvori Sports Hall, Ohrid; Attendance: 100; Referees: Konjičanin, Konjičanin (BIH) |
| 1 August 2014; 12:15 | 4× (yellow card) 2× (suspension) | Report | 3× (yellow card) 3× (suspension) | Biljanini Izvori Sports Hall, Ohrid; Attendance: 100; Referees: Konjičanin, Konjičanin (BIH) |

| 1 August 2014; 14:45 | South Korea | 28–26 | Russia | Biljanini Izvori Sports Hall, Ohrid; Attendance: 200; Referees: Jedermann, Posch (USA) |
| 1 August 2014; 14:45 | Kim Seon-geun 9 | (13–13) | Kiprigina 5 | Biljanini Izvori Sports Hall, Ohrid; Attendance: 200; Referees: Jedermann, Posch (USA) |
| 1 August 2014; 14:45 | 2× (yellow card) 3× (suspension) | Report | 2× (yellow card) 2× (suspension) | Biljanini Izvori Sports Hall, Ohrid; Attendance: 200; Referees: Jedermann, Posch (USA) |

==== Seventh place game ====
| 3 August 2014; 10:00 | Brazil | 34–31 | Russia | Biljanini Izvori Sports Hall, Ohrid; Attendance: 100; Referees: Pétursson, Sigurjónsson (ISL) |
| 3 August 2014; 10:00 | Paula, Silva 9 | (14–14) | Frolova 11 | Biljanini Izvori Sports Hall, Ohrid; Attendance: 100; Referees: Pétursson, Sigurjónsson (ISL) |
| 3 August 2014; 10:00 | 4× (yellow card) 6× (suspension) | Report | 3× (yellow card) 6× (suspension) | Biljanini Izvori Sports Hall, Ohrid; Attendance: 100; Referees: Pétursson, Sigurjónsson (ISL) |

==== Fifth place game ====
| 3 August 2014; 12:15 | Netherlands | 27–33 | South Korea | Biljanini Izvori Sports Hall, Ohrid; Attendance: 150; Referees: Covalciuc, Covalciuc (MDA) |
| 3 August 2014; 12:15 | Van Rossum 9 | (17–17) | Kang Dah-ye, Yu So-jeong 6 | Biljanini Izvori Sports Hall, Ohrid; Attendance: 150; Referees: Covalciuc, Covalciuc (MDA) |
| 3 August 2014; 12:15 | 3× (yellow card) 4× (suspension) | Report | 3× (yellow card) 2× (suspension) | Biljanini Izvori Sports Hall, Ohrid; Attendance: 150; Referees: Covalciuc, Covalciuc (MDA) |

=== 9th–16th place playoffs ===
Quarterfinals
B1 | Hungary | 23
D3 | Croatia | 27
B3 | Norway | 22
C4 | Argentina | 28
D2 | Portugal | 38
B4 | Japan | 32
A3 | Sweden | 29
D4 | France | 24

Semifinals
D3 | Croatia | 34
C4 | Argentina | 29
D2 | Portugal | 23
A3 | Sweden | 24

Ninth place
D3 | Croatia | 22
A3 | Sweden | 29
Eleventh place
C4 | Argentina | 26
D2 | Portugal | 30

==== 9th–16th place quarterfinals ====
| 30 July 2014; 13:15 | Hungary | 23–27 | Croatia | Sportska Sala-ABA, Strumica; Attendance: 200; Referees: Pavićević, Ražnatović (MNE) |
| 30 July 2014; 13:15 | Horváth, Kiss 6 | (10–14) | Senvald 6 | Sportska Sala-ABA, Strumica; Attendance: 200; Referees: Pavićević, Ražnatović (MNE) |
| 30 July 2014; 13:15 | 3× (yellow card) 4× (suspension) | Report | 2× (yellow card) 8× (suspension) | Sportska Sala-ABA, Strumica; Attendance: 200; Referees: Pavićević, Ražnatović (MNE) |

| 30 July 2014; 15:30 | Norway | 22–28 | Argentina | Sportska Sala-ABA, Strumica; Referees: Diop, Faye (SEN) |
| 30 July 2014; 15:30 | | (14–12) | | Sportska Sala-ABA, Strumica; Referees: Diop, Faye (SEN) |
| 30 July 2014; 15:30 | | Report | | Sportska Sala-ABA, Strumica; Referees: Diop, Faye (SEN) |

| 30 July 2014; 17:45 | Portugal | 38–32 | Japan | Sportska Sala-ABA, Strumica; Attendance: 100; Referees: Alpaizde, Berezkina (RUS) |
| 30 July 2014; 17:45 | Tavares 10 | (20–14) | Fujita 12 | Sportska Sala-ABA, Strumica; Attendance: 100; Referees: Alpaizde, Berezkina (RUS) |
| 30 July 2014; 17:45 | 2× (yellow card) 4× (suspension) | Report | 2× (yellow card) 3× (suspension) | Sportska Sala-ABA, Strumica; Attendance: 100; Referees: Alpaizde, Berezkina (RUS) |

| 30 July 2014; 20:00 | Sweden | 29–24 | France | Sportska Sala-ABA, Strumica; Attendance: 200; Referees: Mykolaitis, Sniurevicius (LTU) |
| 30 July 2014; 20:00 | Fiedorowicz 6 | (14–8) | Mandret, Takamoud 5 | Sportska Sala-ABA, Strumica; Attendance: 200; Referees: Mykolaitis, Sniurevicius (LTU) |
| 30 July 2014; 20:00 | 3× (yellow card) 5× (suspension) | Report | 2× (yellow card) 5× (suspension) | Sportska Sala-ABA, Strumica; Attendance: 200; Referees: Mykolaitis, Sniurevicius (LTU) |

==== 9th–12th place semifinals ====
| 31 July 2014; 17:45 | Croatia | 34–29 | Argentina | Sportska Sala-ABA, Strumica; Attendance: 300; Referees: Allade, Dagba (BEN) |
| 31 July 2014; 17:45 | Ljubičić 10 | (19–13) | Casasola 9 | Sportska Sala-ABA, Strumica; Attendance: 300; Referees: Allade, Dagba (BEN) |
| 31 July 2014; 17:45 | 2× (yellow card) 4× (suspension) | Report | 3× (yellow card) 3× (suspension) | Sportska Sala-ABA, Strumica; Attendance: 300; Referees: Allade, Dagba (BEN) |

| 31 July 2014; 20:00 | Portugal | 23–24 | Sweden | Sportska Sala-ABA, Strumica; Attendance: 150; Referees: Pavićević, Ražnatović (MNE) |
| 31 July 2014; 20:00 | Santiago 9 | (11–16) | Mellegard 8 | Sportska Sala-ABA, Strumica; Attendance: 150; Referees: Pavićević, Ražnatović (MNE) |
| 31 July 2014; 20:00 | 4× (yellow card) 1× (suspension) | Report | 3× (yellow card) 4× (suspension) | Sportska Sala-ABA, Strumica; Attendance: 150; Referees: Pavićević, Ražnatović (MNE) |

==== Eleventh place game ====
| 2 August 2014; 17:45 | Argentina | 26–30 | Portugal | Sportska Sala-ABA, Strumica; Attendance: 100; Referees: Guzmán, Pérez (PUR) |
| 2 August 2014; 17:45 | Pippo 11 | (13–16) | Santiago 10 | Sportska Sala-ABA, Strumica; Attendance: 100; Referees: Guzmán, Pérez (PUR) |
| 2 August 2014; 17:45 | 2× (yellow card) 1× (suspension) | Report | 4× (yellow card) 2× (suspension) | Sportska Sala-ABA, Strumica; Attendance: 100; Referees: Guzmán, Pérez (PUR) |

==== Ninth place game ====
| 2 August 2014; 20:00 | Croatia | 22–29 | Sweden | Sportska Sala-ABA, Strumica; Attendance: 250; Referees: Mykolaitis, Sniurevicius (LTU) |
| 2 August 2014; 20:00 | Senvald 6 | (13–14) | Ekenman-Fernis 9 | Sportska Sala-ABA, Strumica; Attendance: 250; Referees: Mykolaitis, Sniurevicius (LTU) |
| 2 August 2014; 20:00 | 4× (yellow card) 4× (suspension) | Report | 2× (yellow card) 3× (suspension) | Sportska Sala-ABA, Strumica; Attendance: 250; Referees: Mykolaitis, Sniurevicius (LTU) |

=== 13th–16th place playoffs ===
Semifinals
31 July
Hungary | 24
Norway (pen.) | 26
31 July
Japan | 32
France | 26

13th place
2 August
Norway | 34
Japan | 30
15th place
2 August
Hungary | 32
France | 20

==== 13th–16th place semifinals ====
31 July 2014
13:15
Hungary
24–26
Norway
Sportska Sala-ABA, Strumica
Attendance: 100
Referees: Mykolaitis, Sniurevicius (LTU)
Monori 8
(12–12)
Hernes 8
3× (yellow card) 6× (suspension)
Report
4× (yellow card) 8× (suspension)

FT: 23–23

Norway won the shootout 3–1.

| 31 July 2014; 15:30 | Japan | 32–26 | France | Sportska Sala-ABA, Strumica; Attendance: 100; Referees: Paolantoni, Zanikian (ARG) |
| 31 July 2014; 15:30 | Kawarabata 8 | (14–10) | Sylla 5 | Sportska Sala-ABA, Strumica; Attendance: 100; Referees: Paolantoni, Zanikian (ARG) |
| 31 July 2014; 15:30 | 3× (yellow card) 2× (suspension) | Report | 3× (yellow card) 5× (suspension) | Sportska Sala-ABA, Strumica; Attendance: 100; Referees: Paolantoni, Zanikian (ARG) |

==== 15th place game ====
| 2 August 2014; 13:15 | Hungary | 32–20 | France | Sportska Sala-ABA, Strumica; Attendance: 100; Referees: Allade, Dagba (BEN) |
| 2 August 2014; 13:15 | Hámori, Ferenczy 5 | (14–10) | Sercien 6 | Sportska Sala-ABA, Strumica; Attendance: 100; Referees: Allade, Dagba (BEN) |
| 2 August 2014; 13:15 | 3× (yellow card) 1× (suspension) | Report | 4× (yellow card) 2× (suspension) | Sportska Sala-ABA, Strumica; Attendance: 100; Referees: Allade, Dagba (BEN) |

==== 13th place game ====
| 2 August 2014; 15:30 | Norway | 34–30 | Japan | Sportska Sala-ABA, Strumica; Attendance: 200; Referees: Pavićević, Ražnatović (MNE) |
| 2 August 2014; 15:30 | Hernes 12 | (14–15) | Fujita, Kondo 5 | Sportska Sala-ABA, Strumica; Attendance: 200; Referees: Pavićević, Ražnatović (MNE) |
| 2 August 2014; 15:30 | 3× (yellow card) 2× (suspension) | Report | 3× (yellow card) | Sportska Sala-ABA, Strumica; Attendance: 200; Referees: Pavićević, Ražnatović (MNE) |

=== 17th–20th place playoffs ===
Semifinals
28 July
Tunisia | 26
Paraguay | 22
28 July
North Macedonia | 24
Angola | 22

17th place
29 July
Tunisia | 16
North Macedonia | 23
19th place
29 July
Paraguay | 29
Angola | 28

==== 17th–20th place semifinals ====
| 28 July 2014; 13:15 | Tunisia | 26–22 | Paraguay | SRC Kale, Skopje; Attendance: 50; Referees: Paolantoni, Zanikian (ARG) |
| 28 July 2014; 13:15 | Rezgui, Ragoubi 6 | (12–13) | Fiore 10 | SRC Kale, Skopje; Attendance: 50; Referees: Paolantoni, Zanikian (ARG) |
| 28 July 2014; 13:15 | 3× (yellow card) 6× (suspension) | Report | 3× (yellow card) | SRC Kale, Skopje; Attendance: 50; Referees: Paolantoni, Zanikian (ARG) |

| 28 July 2014; 15:30 | North Macedonia | 24–22 | Angola | SRC Kale, Skopje; Attendance: 350; Referees: Diop, Faye (SEN) |
| 28 July 2014; 15:30 | Ristovska 7 | (13–11) | Costa 6 | SRC Kale, Skopje; Attendance: 350; Referees: Diop, Faye (SEN) |
| 28 July 2014; 15:30 | 2× (yellow card) 4× (suspension) | Report | 3× (suspension) 1× (red card) | SRC Kale, Skopje; Attendance: 350; Referees: Diop, Faye (SEN) |

==== 19th place game ====
| 29 July 2014; 13:15 | Paraguay | 29–28 | Angola | SRC Kale, Skopje; Attendance: 100; Referees: Allada, Dagba (BEN) |
| 29 July 2014; 13:15 | Fernández 8 | (12–16) | Costa 7 | SRC Kale, Skopje; Attendance: 100; Referees: Allada, Dagba (BEN) |
| 29 July 2014; 13:15 | 3× (yellow card) 1× (suspension) | Report | 2× (yellow card) 3× (suspension) | SRC Kale, Skopje; Attendance: 100; Referees: Allada, Dagba (BEN) |

==== 17th place game ====
| 29 July 2014; 15:30 | Tunisia | 16–23 | North Macedonia | SRC Kale, Skopje; Attendance: 300; Referees: Guzmán, Pérez (PUR) |
| 29 July 2014; 15:30 | Ben Abdallah 5 | (8–11) | Ristovska 7 | SRC Kale, Skopje; Attendance: 300; Referees: Guzmán, Pérez (PUR) |
| 29 July 2014; 15:30 | 2× (yellow card) 2× (suspension) | Report | 3× (yellow card) 6× (suspension) | SRC Kale, Skopje; Attendance: 300; Referees: Guzmán, Pérez (PUR) |

=== 21st–24th place playoffs ===
Semifinals
28 July
Kazakhstan | 26
DR Congo | 23
28 July
Uzbekistan | 29
China | 33

21st place
29 July
Kazakhstan | 27
China | 25
23rd place
29 July
DR Congo | 34
Uzbekistan | 25

==== 21st–24th place semifinals ====
| 28 July 2014; 17:45 | Kazakhstan | 26–23 | DR Congo | SRC Kale, Skopje; Attendance: 100; Referees: Abid, Chaouch (TUN) |
| 28 July 2014; 17:45 | three players 4 | (12–10) | Hendo 7 | SRC Kale, Skopje; Attendance: 100; Referees: Abid, Chaouch (TUN) |
| 28 July 2014; 17:45 | 3× (yellow card) 4× (suspension) | Report | 3× (yellow card) 6× (suspension) | SRC Kale, Skopje; Attendance: 100; Referees: Abid, Chaouch (TUN) |

| 28 July 2014; 20:00 | Uzbekistan | 29–33 | China | SRC Kale, Skopje; Attendance: 100; Referees: Allada, Dagba (BEN) |
| 28 July 2014; 20:00 | Abdulhamidova 10 | (16–14) | Yang Yin 11 | SRC Kale, Skopje; Attendance: 100; Referees: Allada, Dagba (BEN) |
| 28 July 2014; 20:00 | 3× (yellow card) 3× (suspension) | Report | 3× (yellow card) 2× (suspension) | SRC Kale, Skopje; Attendance: 100; Referees: Allada, Dagba (BEN) |

==== 23rd place game ====
| 29 July 2014; 17:45 | DR Congo | 34–25 | Uzbekistan | SRC Kale, Skopje; Attendance: 50; Referees: Diop, Faye (SEN) |
| 29 July 2014; 17:45 | Hendo 14 | (12–12) | Najmedinova, Erkinova 6 | SRC Kale, Skopje; Attendance: 50; Referees: Diop, Faye (SEN) |
| 29 July 2014; 17:45 | 2× (yellow card) 5× (suspension) | Report | 3× (yellow card) 6× (suspension) | SRC Kale, Skopje; Attendance: 50; Referees: Diop, Faye (SEN) |

==== 21st place game ====
| 29 July 2014; 20:00 | Kazakhstan | 27–25 | China | SRC Kale, Skopje; Attendance: 100; Referees: Paolantoni, Zanikian (ARG) |
| 29 July 2014; 20:00 | Abilda 10 | (12–14) | Suo Shan Shan 8 | SRC Kale, Skopje; Attendance: 100; Referees: Paolantoni, Zanikian (ARG) |
| 29 July 2014; 20:00 | 1× (yellow card) 5× (suspension) | Report | 4× (yellow card) 9× (suspension) | SRC Kale, Skopje; Attendance: 100; Referees: Paolantoni, Zanikian (ARG) |

== Ranking and statistics ==
=== Final ranking ===
| Rank | Team |
|---|---|
| Gold medal | Romania |
| Silver medal | Germany |
| Bronze medal | Denmark |
| 4 | Montenegro |
| 5 | South Korea |
| 6 | Netherlands |
| 7 | Brazil |
| 8 | Russia |
| 9 | Sweden |
| 10 | Croatia |
| 11 | Portugal |
| 12 | Argentina |
| 13 | Norway |
| 14 | Japan |
| 15 | Hungary |
| 16 | France |
| 17 | North Macedonia |
| 18 | Tunisia |
| 19 | Paraguay |
| 20 | Angola |
| 21 | Kazakhstan |
| 22 | China |
| 23 | DR Congo |
| 24 | Uzbekistan |

=== Awards ===
MVP

- Emily Bölk (GER)

Topscorer

- Yu So-jeong (KOR) (81 goals)

All-star team

- Goalkeeper: Jessica Jochims (GER)
- Right wing: Stine Holm (DEN)
- Right back: Durdina Malović (MNE)
- Central back: Cristina Laslo (ROU)
- Left back: Bianca Bazaliu (ROU)
- Left wing: Itana Grbić (MNE)
- Pivot: Lorena Ostase (ROU)

Chosen by team officials and IHF experts: IHF.info

=== Topscorers ===
| Rank | Name | Team | Goals | Shots | % |
|---|---|---|---|---|---|
| 1 | Yu So-jeong | South Korea | 81 | 115 | 70.4% |
| 2 | Ida Hernes | Norway | 76 | 110 | 69.1% |
| 3 | Bianca Bazaliu | Romania | 76 | 137 | 55.5% |
| 4 | Sandra Santiago | Portugal | 71 | 123 | 57.7% |
| 5 | Patricia Rodrigues | Portugal | 68 | 111 | 61.3% |
| 6 | Emily Bölk | Germany | 67 | 115 | 58.3% |
| 7 | Durdina Jauković | Montenegro | 62 | 122 | 50.8% |
| 8 | Kim Seon-geun | South Korea | 59 | 78 | 75.6% |
| 9 | Emma Ekenman-Fernis | Sweden | 54 | 77 | 70.1% |
| 10 | Mercianne Hendo | DR Congo | 51 | 86 | 59.3% |

Source: IHF.info

=== Top goalkeepers ===
| Rank | Name | Team | Saves | Shots | % |
|---|---|---|---|---|---|
| 1 | Jessica Ferreira | Portugal | 124 | 335 | 37.0% |
| 2 | Jessica Jochims | Germany | 116 | 284 | 40.8% |
| 3 | Magdalena Ećimović | Croatia | 103 | 252 | 40.9% |
| 4 | Tonje Haug Lerstad | Norway | 101 | 253 | 39.9% |
| 5 | Rinka Duijndam | Netherlands | 96 | 256 | 37.5% |
| 6 | Camila Dominici | Argentina | 93 | 307 | 30.3% |
| 7 | Althea Reinhardt | Denmark | 92 | 214 | 43.0% |
| 8 | Victoria Alric | France | 80 | 242 | 33.1% |
| 9 | Ana Rajković | Montenegro | 78 | 197 | 39.6% |
| 10 | Dragana Petkovska | North Macedonia | 78 | 217 | 35.9% |

Source: IHF.info
