= Romania women's national youth handball team =

Romania

Information
- Association: Romanian Handball Federation
- Coach: Victorina Bora

Colours
1st	2nd

Results

IHF U-18 World Championship
- Appearances: 8 (First in 2006)
- Best result: (gold) Winner (2014 )

European Championship
- Appearances: 12 (First in 1994)
- Best result: (gold) Winner (1999)
- Last updated on Unknown.

The Romania women's youth national handball team is the national under–17 Handball team of Romania. Controlled by the Romanian Handball Federation it represents Romania in international matches.

== World Championship record ==
- 2006 – 3rd place
- 2012 – 4th place
- 2014 – 1stplace
- 2016 – 14th place
- 2018 – 9th place
- 2022 – 14th place
- 2024 – 17th place
- 2026 – 12th place

== Team ==
=== Notable coaches ===
- Aurelian Roşca
- Gavril Kozma
- Mircea Anton

=== All-Star ===
- Ionela Gâlcă-Stanca
- Florentina Grecu-Stanciu
- Alexandra Cătineanu
- Nicoleta Dincă
- Cristina Neagu
- Gabriela Perianu
- Bianca Bazaliu
- Cristina Laslo
- Lorena Ostase
- Diana Ciucă
- Sorina Tîrcă
