= Hungary women's national youth handball team =

Hungary

Information
- Association: Hungarian Handball Federation
- Coach: Attila Kun

Colours
1st	2nd

Results

IHF U-18 World Championship
- Appearances: 8 (First in 2010)
- Best result: (silver) (2018)

European U-17 Handball Championship
- Appearances: 14 (First in 1992)
- Best result: (gold) Champions (2019, 2021)
- Last updated on Unknown.

Hungary women's national youth handball team
Medal record

Youth World Championship
Silver medal – second place	2018 Poland	
Bronze medal – third place	2022 North Macedonia	

Youth European Championship
Gold medal – first place	2019 Slovenia	
Gold medal – first place	2021 Montenegro	
Bronze medal – third place	2001 Turkey	
Bronze medal – third place	2003 Russia	
Bronze medal – third place	2015 Macedonia	
Bronze medal – third place	2017 Slovakia	

The Hungary women's youth national handball team is the national under–17 Handball team of the Hungary. Controlled by the Hungarian Handball Federation it represents the country in international matches.

== History ==
=== IHF U-18 World Championship ===
Champions Runners up Third place Fourth place

IHF U-18 World Championship record
Year	Round	Position	GP	W	D	L	GS	GA	GD
(Canada) 2006	Did not qualify								
(Slovenia) 2008	Did not qualify								
(Dominican Republic) 2010	Eightfinals	11th	6	3	1	2	207	161	+46
(Montenegro) 2012	Quarterfinals	5th	7	5	1	1	208	155	+53
(North Macedonia) 2014	Eightfinals	15th	9	6	0	3	254	205	+49
(Slovenia) 2016	Quarterfinals	5th	9	8	0	1	297	200	+97
(Poland) 2018	Final	2nd	9	8	0	1	292	207	+85
(Croatia) 2020	Cancelled								
(North Macedonia) 2022	Bronze match	3rd	8	7	0	1	229	184	+45
(China) 2024	Bronze match	3rd	8	7	0	1	229	147	+82
(Romania) 2026	Quarterfinals	8th	8	4	1	3	269	221	+48
Total	6 / 9	0 Titles	64	50	3	13	1985	1480	+505

=== European U-17 Championship ===
Champions Runners up Third place Fourth place

European U-17 Championship record
Year	Round	Position	GP	W	D	L	GS	GA	GD
(Hungary) 1992	Semifinal	4th							
(Lithuania) 1994	Main Round	8th							
(Austria) 1997	Main Round	7th							
(Germany) 1999	Main Round	6th							
(Turkey) 2001	Semifinal	3rd							
(Russia) 2003	Semifinal	3rd							
(Austria) 2005	Main Round	8th							
(Slovakia) 2007	Did not Qualify								
(Serbia) 2009	Main Round	5th	7	4	0	3	244	215	+29
(Czech Republic) 2011	Semifinal	4th	7	4	0	3	193	177	+16
(Poland) 2013	Group Stage	9th	5	3	0	2	139	120	+19
(North Macedonia) 2015	Semifinal	3rd	7	5	0	2	219	205	+14
(Slovakia) 2017	Semifinal	3rd	5	3	1	1	134	115	+19
(Slovenia) 2019	Champions	1st	7	7	0	0	210	167	+43
(Montenegro) 2021	Champions	1st	7	7	0	0	224	135	+89
Total	14 / 15	2 Titles	45	33	1	11	1363	1134	+229

*Red border color indicates tournament was held on home soil.

=== Other tournaments ===
European Youth Olympic Festival

- Gold: 2017, 2022
- Bronze: 2019

European Open Handball Championship

- Gold: 2018
- Bronze: 2008

== See also ==
- Hungary women's national handball team
- Hungary women's national junior handball team
