= Anastasia Suslova =

Russian handball player

Personal information
- Full name: Anastasia Suslova
- Nationality: Russian
- Born: 11 October 1996 (age 30) Volgograd, Russia
- Height: 1.83 m (6 ft 0 in)

Sport
- Sport: Handball
- Position: Left back
- Current club: ŽRK Budućnost
- Number: 11

Senior clubs
- Years: Team
- 2013–2018: Dinamo Volgograd
- 2018–2019: ŽRK Budućnost
- 2019–: Zvezda Zvenigorod
National team
- Years: Team
- 2015–: Russia
Medal record
IHF Junior World Championship
Silver medal – second place	2016 Russia
European Youth Championship
Silver medal – second place	2013 Poland
Youth Olympic Games
Silver medal – second place	2014 Nanjing
European Youth Olympic Festival
Silver medal – second place	2013 Utrecht

Anastasia Suslova (born 11 October 1996) is a Russian handball player who plays for Zvezda Zvenigorod and the Russian national team.

== International honours ==
- EHF Champions League:
  - Fourth place: 2015
