= Gerd Elin Albert =

Norwegian handball player (born 1981)

Gerd Elin Albert (born 21 April 1981) is a Norwegian handball player.

She started her career in IK Våg, belonging to the same generation as Katrine Lunde and Kristine Lunde. She was also a youth international for Norway.

Albert moved to Germany in 2001 and played professionally for HC Leipzig. With Leipzig she participated in the EHC Cup of 2001–02 and 2004–05, as well as the Champions League of 2002–03 and 2006–07. She also performed well enough to be called up to the Norwegian national team in 2003. She was described as a replacement for Kristine Duvholt.

Albert returned to Norway and Våg in 2007, but left in 2008.

Albert studied medicine in Leipzig. Marrying and taking the name Gerd Elin Albert-Hoff, she settled as a general practitioner in Strømmen.
