= Emily Bölk =

German handball player (born 1998)

Emily Vogel
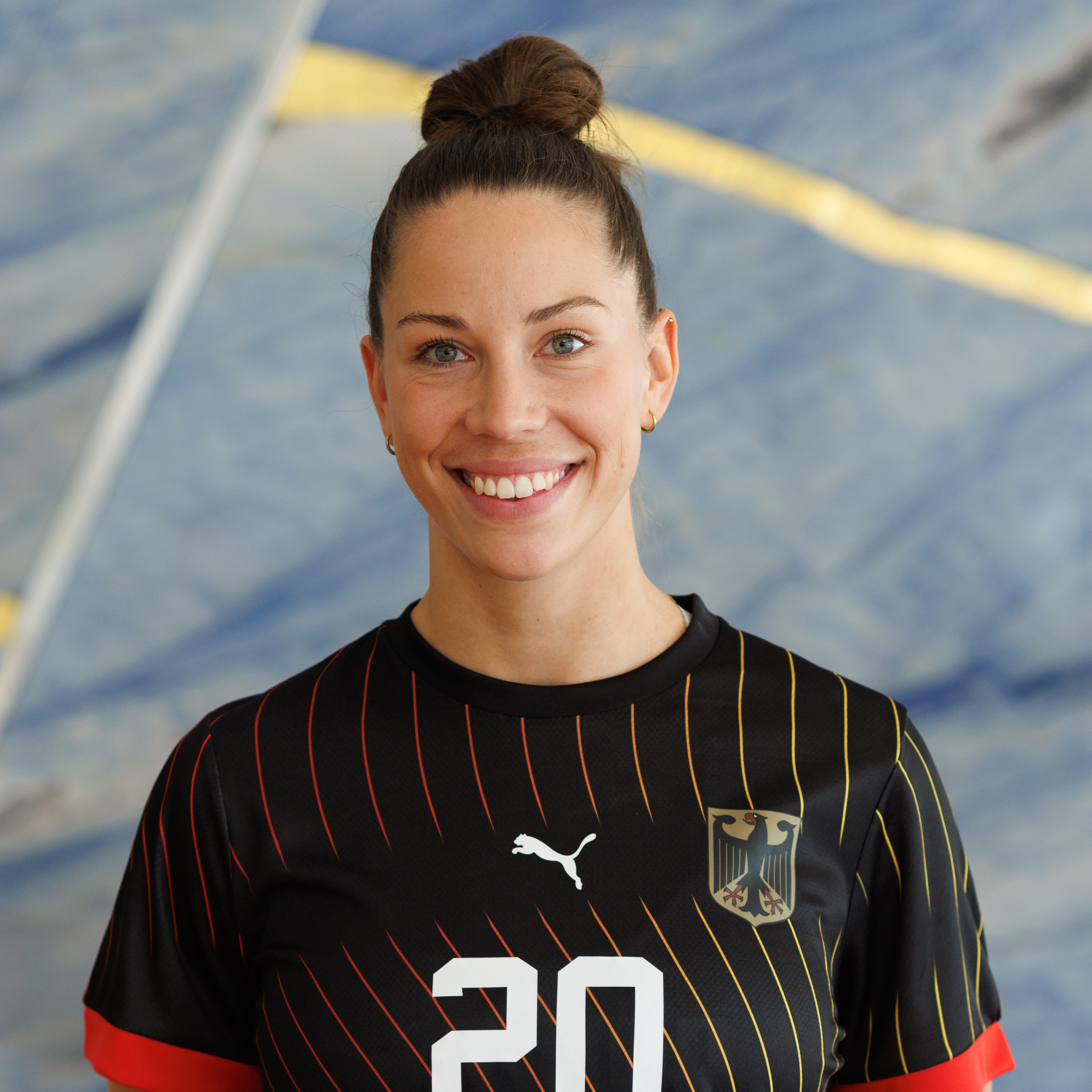
- Bölk in 2024

Personal information
- Full name: Emily Charlot Vogel
- Nationality: German
- Born: 26 April 1998 (age 28) Buxtehude, Germany
- Height: 1.82 m (6 ft 0 in)

Sport
- Sport: Handball
- Position: Left back
- Current club: Ferencvárosi TC
- Number: 20

Youth career
- Years: Team
- 2002–2012: Buxtehuder SV
- 2012–2013: Sports Academy Viborg
- 2013–2016: Buxtehuder SV

Senior clubs
- Years: Team
- 2014–2018: Buxtehuder SV
- 2018–2020: Thüringer HC
- 2020–: Ferencvárosi TC
National team
Years	Team	Apps	(Gls)
2016–	Germany	138	(413)
Medal record
World Championship
Silver medal – second place	2025 Netherlands/Germany
Youth World Championship
Silver medal – second place	2014 Macedonia
- Updated on 7 November 2025

Emily Charlot Vogel (née Bölk, born 26 April 1998) is a German handballer for Ferencvárosi TC and the Germany national team.

== Career ==
=== Youth teams ===
Emily Bölk started at the youth team of Buxtehuder SV in 2002. In 2012 she joined the Sports academy of Danish team Viborg HK.

=== First team debut ===
A year later she returned to Buxtehuder SV. In the 2014-15 season she became part of the first team. She debuted for the senior team on 7 September 2014 against HC Leipzig. The same year she won the DHB-Pokal with the club. She won it again in 2017. She played 99 games for them, scoring 406 goals.

=== Thüringer HC ===
In 2018 she joined league rivals Thüringer HC. Here she won the DHB Supercup just the following September. The same season she won the DHB-Pokal for a third time. In the final against SG BBM Bietigheim she scored the last-second winner to make it 24-23.

=== Ferencváros ===
For the 2020-21 season she joined Hungarian Ferencvárosi TC. Here she won the 2021 Hungarian championship. She was the second best goalscorer in the league that season with 124 goals, only behind Angela Malestein with 136.

The following two years she won the Hungarian cup back-to-back. In the 2022-23 season she reached the final of the Champions League.

In 2024 she won the Hungarian cup for a third time, as well as the Hungarian league.

== National team ==
Having played for various youth national teams, Bölk made her debut for the German senior team on 5 June 2016 against Iceland. Her first major international tournament was the 2016 European Championship, where Germany finished 6th.

She was not initially a part of the team for the 2017 World Championship at home soil due to injury, but was called up after 3 games. Germany reached the round of 16. Bölk played 4 games, scoring 5 goals.

A year later she played at the 2018 European Championship, where Germany finished 10th. Bölk played 6 games scoring 20 goals.

At the 2019 World Championship she finished 8th with the German team, which meant they did not qualify for the 2020 Olympics.

In June 2021 she was appointed the captain of the German national team, together with Alina Grijseels. Half a year later she played at the 2021 World Championship, where Germany reached the quarterfinal, where they lost to Spain. Bölk scored 15 goals during the tournament.

At the 2022 European Championship she was the second best German goalscorer with 28 goals. Germany finished 7th. A year later she finished 6th at the 2023 World Championship with the German team. Bölk scored 20 goals.

At the 2024 Olympics she represented Germany at an Olympics for the first time.

She also represented Germany at the 2025 World Women's Handball Championship. Here Germany reached the final, where they lost to Norway. This was the first time since 1994 that Germany made the final of a major international tournament and the first time they won a medal since 2007. Vogel was part of the tournament all-star team.

== Awards ==
- World Championship:
  - Silver : 2025
- EHF Champions League:
  - Silver : 2023
- Nemzeti Bajnokság:
  - Gold: 2021, 2024
- Hungarian Cup
  - Gold: 2022, 2023, 2024
- German Cup
  - Gold: 2015, 2017, 2019

== Individual awards ==
- All-Star left back of the IHF World Handball Championship: 2025
- MVP of the IHF Youth World Championship: 2014
- All-Star Left back of the European Junior Championship 2015
- German handballer of the year: 2018, 2019, 2023

== Personal life ==
She is the daughter of fellow handballer Andrea Bölk, who won the 1993 World Championship.

In summer 2025 she married Hungarian water polo player, Simon Vogel, the older brother of Soma Vogel.
