= Daria Belikova =

Russian handball player (born 1997)

Personal information
- Nationality: Russian
- Born: 7 March 1997 (age 29) Volgograd, Russia

Sport
- Sport: Handball
- Position: Line player
- Current club: Dinamo-Sinara

Senior clubs
- Years: Team
- 2014-: Dinamo-Sinara
National team
- Years: Team
- 2016-: Russia
Medal record
Junior World Championship
Silver medal – second place	2016 Russia
European Junior Championship
Silver medal – second place	2015 Spain
European Youth Championship
Silver medal – second place	2013 Poland
Youth Olympic Games
Silver medal – second place	2014 Nanjing
European Youth Olympic Festival
Silver medal – second place	2013 Utrecht

Daria Belikova (born 7 March 1997) is a Russian handballer who plays for Dinamo-Sinara and the Russian national team.

== International honours ==
- EHF Champions League:
  - Fourth place: 2015
