= Tuva Høve =

Norwegian handball player (born 2000)

Personal information
- Full name: Tuva Ulsaker Høve
- Nationality: Norwegian
- Born: 11 June 2000 (age 26) Trondheim, Norway
- Height: 1.75 m (5 ft 9 in)

Sport
- Sport: Handball
- Position: Right wing
- Current club: SCM Râmnicu Vâlcea
- Number: 4

Youth career
- Years: Team
- 2007–2016: Byåsen IL

Senior clubs
- Years: Team
- 2016–2019: Byåsen IL
- 2019–2021: Aker Topphåndball
- 2021–01/2025: Vipers Kristiansand
- 01/2025–06/2025: Byåsen HE
- 2025–: SCM Râmnicu Vâlcea
National team
Years	Team	Apps	(Gls)
2021–	Norway	9	(15)
Medal record
Junior European Championship
Bronze medal – third place	2019 Hungary
Youth European Championship
Silver medal – second place	2017 Slovakia

Tuva Ulsaker Høve (born 11 June 2000) is a Norwegian handball player for SCM Râmnicu Vâlcea.

On 12 February 2021, it was announced that she had signed a 3-year contract with Vipers Kristiansand. After signing a new 2-year contract in March 2024, she left in January 2025 when the club went bankrupt.

She also represented Norway at the 2017 European Women's U-17 Handball Championship, placing second, at the 2018 Women's Youth World Handball Championship, placing 11th and at the 2019 Women's U-19 European Handball Championship, placing third.

== Achievements ==
- European Women's U-19 Handball Championship:
  - Bronze Medalist: 2019
- Youth European Championship:
  - Silver Medalist: 2017
- EHF Champions League:
  - Winner: 2021/2022, 2022/2023
- Norwegian League:
  - Winner: 2021/2022, 2022/2023, 2023/2024
- Norwegian Cup:
  - Winner: 2021, 2022/23, 2023/24

== Individual awards ==
- All-Star Right Wing of REMA 1000-ligaen: 2020/2021, 2023/2024
- Topscorer of Liga Florilor MOL: 2025/2026 (144 goals)
