= Handball at the 2014 Summer Youth Olympics – Girls' tournament =

Girls' handball at the II Summer Youth Games

Tournament details
- Host country: China
- Venue: 1 (in 1 host city)
- Dates: 20–25 August
- Teams: 6 (from 4 confederations)

Final positions
- Champions: South Korea (1st title)
- Runners-up: Russia
- Third place: Sweden
- Fourth place: Brazil

Tournament statistics
- Matches played: 12
- Goals scored: 639 (53.25 per match)

The girls handball tournament at the 2014 Summer Youth Olympics in Nanjing was held from 20 to 25 August. Games were played at the Jiangning Sports Center Gymnasium.

South Korea won their first title after defeating Russia 32-31 in the final. Sweden captured the bronze, by winning against Brazil 23-16.

== Competition schedule ==
G	Group stage	P	Placement matches	½	Semi-finals	B	Bronze medal match	F	Final

Date Event	Wed 20	Thu 21	Fri 22	Sat 23	Sun 24		Mon 25	
Women	G	G	G	G	P	½	B	F

== Qualification ==
Event	Location	Date	Total Places	Qualified	Group
Host Nation	(Canada) Vancouver	10 February 2010	1	China	B
2013 European Youth Championship	(Poland) Gdańsk/Gdynia	15–25 August 2013	2	Sweden	B
2013 European Youth Championship	(Poland) Gdańsk/Gdynia	15–25 August 2013	2	Russia	A
2013 Asian Youth Games	(China) Nanjing	16–24 August 2013	1	South Korea	A
2013 African Youth Nations Championship	(Republic of the Congo) Oyo	22–31 August 2013	1	Angola	A
2014 Pan American Youth Championship	(Brazil) Fortaleza	20–28 April 2014	1	Brazil	B
Oceania Qualification Event	-	Cancelled	0		
TOTAL			6		

== Competition format ==
The six teams in the tournament were divided into two groups of three, with each team initially playing round-robin games within their group. Following the completion of the round-robin stage, the top two teams from each group advance to the semi-finals. The two semi-final winners meet for the gold medal match, while the semi-final losers play in the bronze medal match.

== Preliminary round ==
=== Group A ===
Pos	Team	Pld	W	D	L	GF	GA	GD	Pts	Qualification
1	Russia	2	2	0	0	70	52	+18	4	Semifinals
2	South Korea	2	1	0	1	70	59	+11	2	Semifinals
3	Angola	2	0	0	2	44	73	−29	0	5th place game

Source: Nanjing 2014
Rules for classification: 1) points; 2) head-to-head points; 3) head-to-head goal difference; 4) head-to-head number of goals scored; 5) goal difference.

20 August; 14:00	Angola	21–34	Russia	Jiangning Sports Center Gymnasium; Referees: Engberg, Laurell (Sweden)
20 August; 14:00	Paulino 8	(12–20)	three players 4	Jiangning Sports Center Gymnasium; Referees: Engberg, Laurell (Sweden)
20 August; 14:00	1× (yellow card) 1× (suspension)	Report	3× (yellow card) 3× (suspension)	Jiangning Sports Center Gymnasium; Referees: Engberg, Laurell (Sweden)

21 August; 14:00	South Korea	39–23	Angola	Jiangning Sports Center Gymnasium; Referees: Ota, Shimajiri (Japan)
21 August; 14:00	Kang D. 7	(20–11)	Da Costa 6	Jiangning Sports Center Gymnasium; Referees: Ota, Shimajiri (Japan)
21 August; 14:00	2× (yellow card) 3× (suspension)	Report	3× (yellow card) 4× (suspension)	Jiangning Sports Center Gymnasium; Referees: Ota, Shimajiri (Japan)

22 August; 14:00	Russia	36–31	South Korea	Jiangning Sports Center Gymnasium; Referees: Wang, Li (China)
22 August; 14:00	Frolova 9	(16–16)	Yu 7	Jiangning Sports Center Gymnasium; Referees: Wang, Li (China)
22 August; 14:00	2× (yellow card) 3× (suspension)		3× (yellow card) 1× (suspension)	Jiangning Sports Center Gymnasium; Referees: Wang, Li (China)

=== Group B ===
Pos	Team	Pld	W	D	L	GF	GA	GD	Pts	Qualification
1	Sweden	2	2	0	0	71	38	+33	4	Semifinals
2	Brazil	2	1	0	1	56	50	+6	2	Semifinals
3	China (H)	2	0	0	2	32	71	−39	0	5th place game

Source: Nanjing 2014
Rules for classification: 1) points; 2) head-to-head points; 3) head-to-head goal difference; 4) head-to-head number of goals scored; 5) goal difference.
(H) Hosts

20 August; 16:00	China	14–39	Sweden	Jiangning Sports Center Gymnasium; Referees: Gasmi, Gasmi (France)
20 August; 16:00	Suo 5	(8–20)	three players 7	Jiangning Sports Center Gymnasium; Referees: Gasmi, Gasmi (France)
20 August; 16:00	3× (yellow card) 7× (suspension)	Report	3× (yellow card)	Jiangning Sports Center Gymnasium; Referees: Gasmi, Gasmi (France)

21 August; 14:00	Brazil	32–18	China	Jiangning Sports Center Gymnasium; Referees: Brunner, Salah (Switzerland)
21 August; 14:00	Costa, Fernandes 5	(14–6)	Liu 6	Jiangning Sports Center Gymnasium; Referees: Brunner, Salah (Switzerland)
21 August; 14:00	3× (yellow card) 1× (suspension)	Report	3× (yellow card) 3× (suspension)	Jiangning Sports Center Gymnasium; Referees: Brunner, Salah (Switzerland)

22 August; 14:00	Sweden	32–24	Brazil	Jiangning Sports Center Gymnasium; Referees: Shimajiri, Ota (Japan)
22 August; 14:00	Mellegård 7	(16–11)	Carneiro, De Paula 6	Jiangning Sports Center Gymnasium; Referees: Shimajiri, Ota (Japan)
22 August; 14:00	2× (yellow card) 2× (suspension)	Report	3× (yellow card) 4× (suspension) 1× (red card)	Jiangning Sports Center Gymnasium; Referees: Shimajiri, Ota (Japan)

== Knockout stage ==
=== Fifth place game ===
24 August; 9:00	Angola	31–18	China	Jiangning Sports Center Gymnasium; Referees: Ota, Shimajiri (Japan)
24 August; 9:00	Paulino 8	(14–6)	Shi 5	Jiangning Sports Center Gymnasium; Referees: Ota, Shimajiri (Japan)
24 August; 9:00		Report	2× (yellow card) 4× (suspension)	Jiangning Sports Center Gymnasium; Referees: Ota, Shimajiri (Japan)

25 August; 9:00	China	22–22	Angola	Jiangning Sports Center Gymnasium; Referees: Wang, Li (China)
25 August; 9:00	Lin, Suo 7	(9–11)	Paulino 9	Jiangning Sports Center Gymnasium; Referees: Wang, Li (China)
25 August; 9:00	3× (yellow card) 1× (suspension)	Report	3× (yellow card) 1× (suspension)	Jiangning Sports Center Gymnasium; Referees: Wang, Li (China)

Angola win 53-40 on aggregate

=== Semifinals ===
24 August; 13:00	South Korea	25–24	Sweden	Jiangning Sports Center Gymnasium; Referees: Brunner, Salah (Switzerland)
24 August; 13:00	Kang E. 6	(11–10)	Ekenman-Fernis 10	Jiangning Sports Center Gymnasium; Referees: Brunner, Salah (Switzerland)
24 August; 13:00	2× (yellow card) 2× (suspension) 1× (red card)	Report	3× (yellow card) 5× (suspension)	Jiangning Sports Center Gymnasium; Referees: Brunner, Salah (Switzerland)

24 August; 15:30	Russia	30–22	Brazil	Jiangning Sports Center Gymnasium; Referees: Liu, Li (China)
24 August; 15:30	Golikova, Vernigorova 5	(17–7)	De Paula 6	Jiangning Sports Center Gymnasium; Referees: Liu, Li (China)
24 August; 15:30	4× (yellow card) 3× (suspension)	Report	3× (yellow card) 1× (suspension)	Jiangning Sports Center Gymnasium; Referees: Liu, Li (China)

=== Bronze medal game ===
25 August; 13:00	Sweden	23–16	Brazil	Jiangning Sports Center Gymnasium; Referees: Shimairi, Ota (Japan)
25 August; 13:00	four players 4	(11–5)	Arruda 5	Jiangning Sports Center Gymnasium; Referees: Shimairi, Ota (Japan)
25 August; 13:00	3× (yellow card) 2× (suspension)	Report	3× (yellow card) 3× (suspension)	Jiangning Sports Center Gymnasium; Referees: Shimairi, Ota (Japan)

=== Gold medal game ===
25 August; 18:00	South Korea	32–31	Russia	Jiangning Sports Center Gymnasium; Referees: Engberg, Laurell (Sweden)
25 August; 18:00	Kang K. 12	(17–14)	Golikova, Markova 7	Jiangning Sports Center Gymnasium; Referees: Engberg, Laurell (Sweden)
25 August; 18:00	3× (yellow card) 5× (suspension)	Report	3× (yellow card) 7× (suspension)	Jiangning Sports Center Gymnasium; Referees: Engberg, Laurell (Sweden)

== Final ranking ==
Rank	Team
1st place, gold medalist(s)	South Korea
2nd place, silver medalist(s)	Russia
3rd place, bronze medalist(s)	Sweden
4	Brazil
5	Angola
6	China
