= Norway women's national youth handball team =

Norway

Information
- Association: Norwegian Handball Federation
- Coach: Pål Oldrup Jensen
- Assistant coach: Sissel Nygård Pedersen
- Most caps: Eli Skogstrand, Tuva Høve, Thale Rushfeldt Deila, Marte Figenschau (18)
- Most goals: Rikke Arnesen (42)

Colours
1st	2nd

Results

IHF U-18 World Championship
- Appearances: 5 (First in 2010)
- Best result: 2nd (2010)

European U-17 Handball Championship
- Appearances: 11 (First in 1992)
- Best result: 1st (1992)
- Last updated on Unknown.

Norway women's national youth handball team
Medal record

IHF U-18 World Championship
Silver medal – second place	2010 Dominican Republic	
Bronze medal – third place	2012 Montenegro	

European U-17 Handball Championship
Gold medal – first place	1992 Hungary	
Silver medal – second place	1997 Austria	
Silver medal – second place	2017 Slovakia	
Bronze medal – third place	2009 Croatia	
Bronze medal – third place	2011 Czech Republic	

The Norway women's youth national handball team is the national under–17 Handball team of Norway. It is controlled by the Norwegian Handball Federation.

== History ==
=== Youth Olympic Games ===
Champions Runners up Third place Fourth place

Youth Olympic Games record
Year	Round	Position	GP	W	D	L	GS	GA	GD
(Singapore) 2010	Did not qualify								
(China) 2014	Did not qualify								
Total	0 / 2	0 Titles	0	0	0	0	0	0	+0

=== IHF U-18 World Championship ===
Champions Runners up Third place Fourth place

IHF U-18 World Championship record
Year	Round	Position	GP	W	D	L	GS	GA	GD
(Canada) 2006	Did not qualify								
(Slovenia) 2008	Did not qualify								
(Dominican Republic) 2010	Final	2nd	6	5	0	1	176	155	+21
(Montenegro) 2012	Semifinal	3rd	7	6	0	1	240	157	+83
(North Macedonia) 2014	Round of 16	13th	6	2	1	3	169	152	+17
(Slovenia) 2016	Semifinal	4th	9	6	0	3	258	222	+36
(Poland) 2018	Round of 16	11th	7	5	0	2	210	159	+51
(Croatia) 2020	Qualified								
(Georgia (country)) 2022	TBD								
Total	6 / 9	0 Titles	35	24	1	10	1053	845	+208

=== European U-17 Championship ===
Champions Runners up Third place Fourth place

European U-17 Championship record
Year	Round	Position	GP	W	D	L	GS	GA	GD
(Hungary) 1992	Final	1st							
(Lithuania) 1994	Intermediate round	5-12th							
(Austria) 1997	Final	2nd							
(Germany) 1999	Preliminary Round	9th							
(Turkey) 2001	Unknown								
(Russia) 2003	Unknown								
(Austria) 2005	Did not Qualify								
(Slovakia) 2007	Intermediate round	9th	8	6	0	2	234	184	+50
(Serbia) 2009	Semifinal	3rd	7	4	1	2	206	187	+19
(Czech Republic) 2011	Semifinal	3rd	8	7	0	1	238	201	+37
(Poland) 2013	Main round	7th	7	2	1	4	184	199	-15
(North Macedonia) 2015	Intermediate round	11th	8	5	0	3	241	236	+5
(Slovenia) 2017	Final	2nd	8	5	0	3	154	168	-12
Total	10 / 13	1 Title	46	29	2	15	1257	1175	+82
