= Elizaveta Malashenko =

Russian handball player

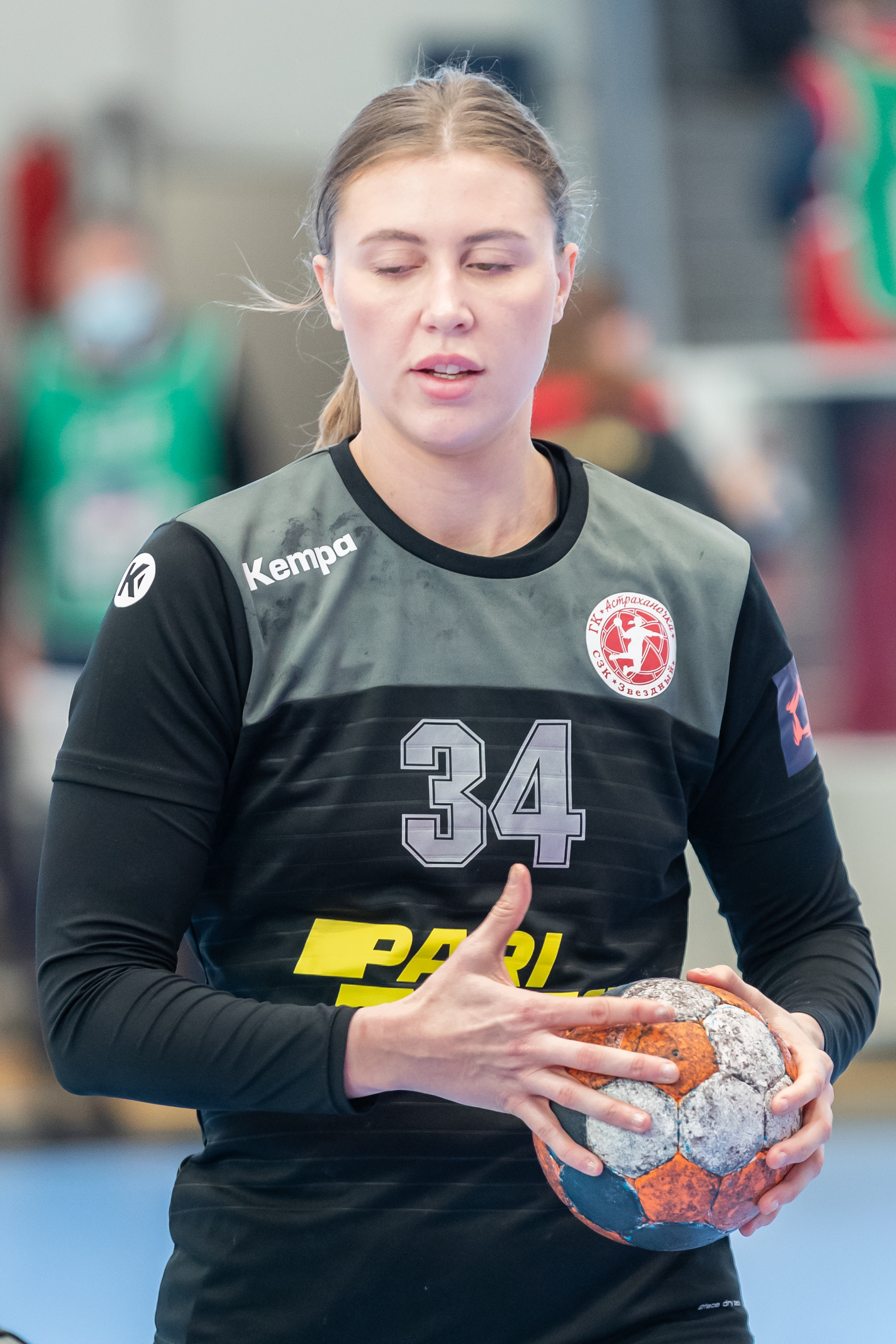

Personal information
- Full name: Elizaveta Vyacheslavovna; Malashenko
- Nationality: Russian
- Born: 26 February 1996 (age 30) Tolyatti, Russia
- Height: 1.80 m (5 ft 11 in)

Sport
- Sport: Handball
- Position: Left back
- Current club: HC Astrakhanochka
- Number: 34

Senior clubs
- Years: Team
- 2013–2017: HC Lada
- 2017–: HC Astrakhanochka
National team
Years	Team	Apps	(Gls)
2015–	Russia	64	(78)
Medal record
World Championship
Bronze medal – third place	2019 Japan
European Championship
Silver medal – second place	2018 France
IHF Junior World Championship
Silver medal – second place	2014 Croatia
Silver medal – second place	2016 Russia
European Junior Championship
Silver medal – second place	2015 Spain
European Youth Championship
Silver medal – second place	2013 Poland
Youth Olympic Games
Silver medal – second place	2014 Nanjing
European Youth Olympic Festival
Silver medal – second place	2013 Utrecht

Elizaveta Vyacheslavovna Malashenko (Russian: Елизавета Вячеславовна Малашенко; born 26 February 1996) is a Russian handballer for HC Astrakhanochka and the Russian national team.

== International honours ==
- EHF Cup:
  - Winner: 2014
- EHF Cup Winners' Cup:
  - Finalist: 2016
