= Bianca Bazaliu =

Romanian handball player (born 1997)

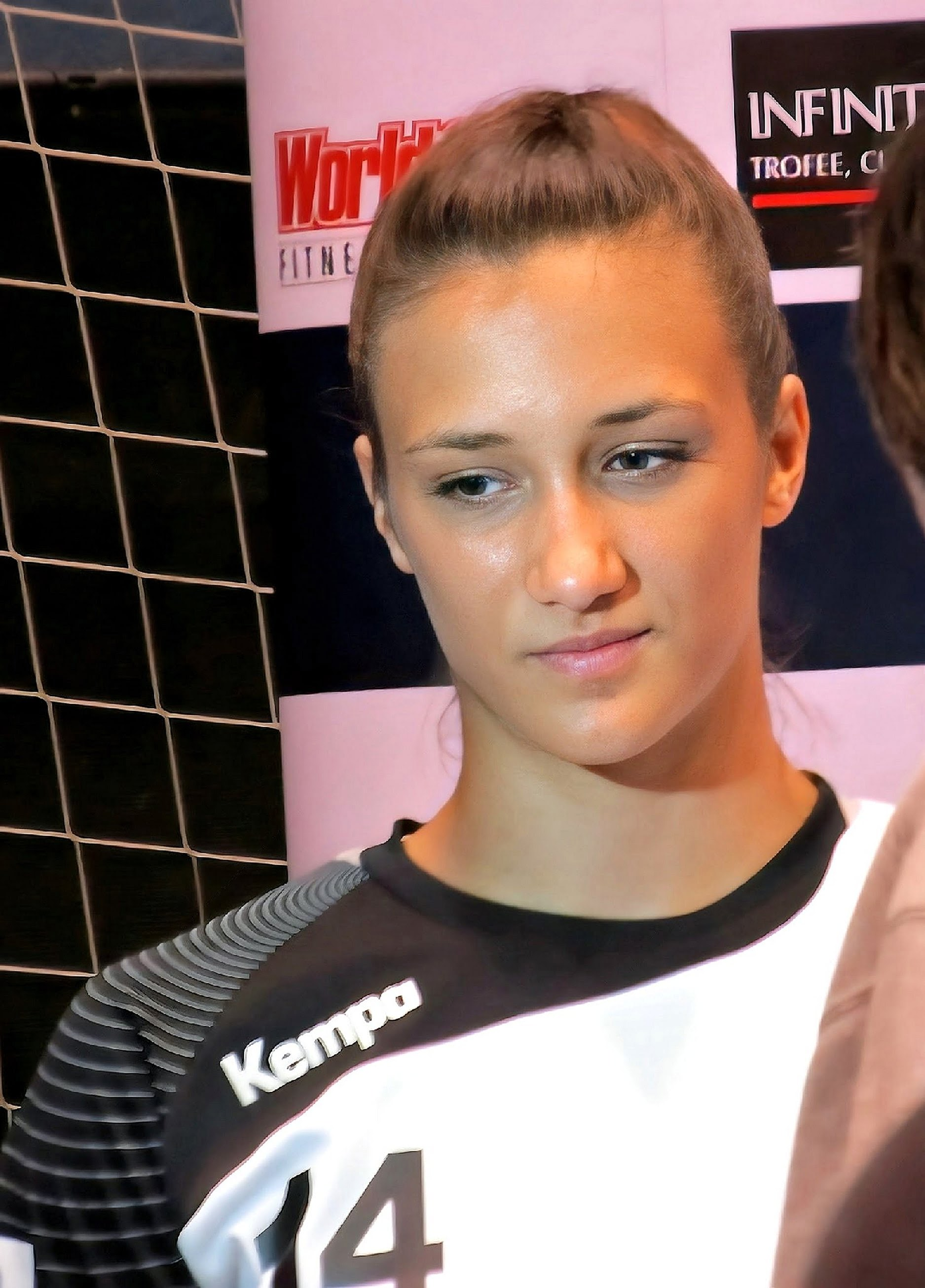

Personal information
- Full name: Bianca Maria Bazaliu
- Nationality: Romanian
- Born: 30 July 1997 (age 29) Slatina, Romania
- Height: 1.83 m (6 ft 0 in)

Sport
- Sport: Handball
- Position: Left back
- Current club: Gloria Bistrița
- Number: 14

Senior clubs
- Years: Team
- –2014: LPS Slatina
- 2014–2019: CSM București
- 2019–2020: Corona Brașov
- 2020–2021: CSM București
- 2021: RK Podravka Koprivnica
- 2021–: Gloria Bistrița
National team
- Years: Team
- 2017–: Romania
Medal record
Representing Romania
Youth World Championship
Gold medal – first place	2014 Macedonia

Bianca Maria Bazaliu (born 30 July 1997) is a Romanian handballer who plays as a left back for RK Podravka Koprivnica.

== Career ==
She was capped for the Romanian national team, finished second on the top scorers' list of the 2014 Youth World Championship with 76 goals, clinched the first place with the national team and was voted into the all-star team as the best left back of the tournament.

She was given the award of Cetățean de onoare ("Honorary Citizen") of her hometown Slatina in 2014.

She was also given the award of Cetățean de onoare ("Honorary Citizen") of the city of Bucharest in 2016.

== International honours ==
- EHF Champions League:
  - Gold Medalist: 2016
  - Bronze Medalist: 2017, 2018
- Youth World Championship:
  - Gold Medalist: 2014
- Bucharest Trophy:
  - Gold Medalist: 2014

== Awards and recognition ==
- All-Star Left Back of the IHF Youth World Championship: 2014
