= Nicoleta Dincă =

Romanian handball player (born 1988)

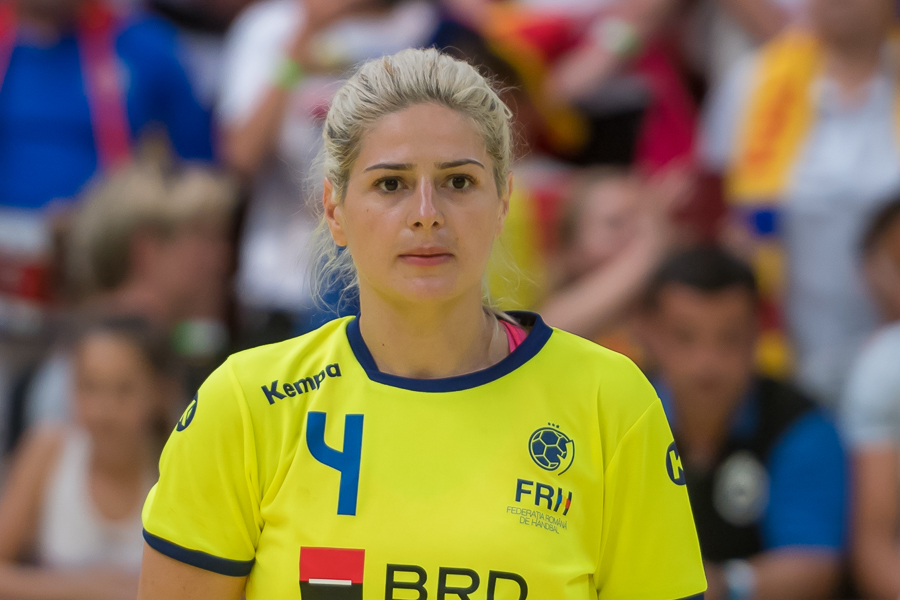
- Dincă in 2017

Personal information
- Full name: Nicoleta-Elena Dincă
- Nationality: Romanian
- Born: 2 July 1988 (age 38) Slatina, Romania
- Height: 1.73 m (5 ft 8 in)

Sport
- Sport: Handball
- Position: Left wing
- Current club: CS Gloria Bistrița-Năsăud
- Number: 2

Senior clubs
- Years: Team
- –2004: LPS Slatina
- 2004–2006: CS Rapid București
- 2007–2013: U Jolidon Cluj Napoca
- 2013–2014: SCM Craiova
- 2014–2017: Corona Brașov
- 2017–: CS Gloria Bistrița-Năsăud
National team
Years	Team	Apps	(Gls)
–	Romania	33	(37)
Medal record
Youth World Championship
Bronze medal – third place	2006 Canada
Junior European Championship
Bronze medal – third place	2007 Turkey
Youth European Championship
Silver medal – second place	2005 Austria

Nicoleta-Elena Dincă (born 2 July 1988) is a Romanian handballer Gloria Bistrița and the Romanian national team.

== Results ==
- EHF Challenge Cup:
  - Finalist: 2007
- Youth European Championship:
  - Silver Medallist 2005
- Youth World Championship:
  - Bronze Medallist 2006
- European Junior Championship:
  - Bronze Medallist 2007
