= Sweden women's national youth handball team =

Sweden

Information
- Association: Swedish Handball Federation
- Coach: Frenne Baverud

Colours
1st	2nd

Results

Youth Olympic Games
- Appearances: 1 (First in 2014)
- Best result: (bronze) Third (2014)

IHF U-18 World Championship
- Appearances: 8 (First in 2010)
- Best result: (gold) Champions (2010)

European Championship
- Appearances: 10 (First in 1999)
- Best result: (gold) Champions (2013)
- Last updated on Unknown.

The Sweden women's youth national handball team is the national under–17 Handball team of Sweden. Controlled by the Swedish Handball Federation it represents the country in international matches.

== History ==
=== Youth Olympic Games ===
Champions Runners up Third place Fourth place

Youth Olympic Games record
Year	Round	Position	GP	W	D	L	GS	GA	GD
(Singapore) 2010	Didn't Qualify								
(China) 2014	Semifinals	3rd place	4	3	0	1	118	79	+39
(Argentina) 2018	No Handball Event								
(Senegal) 2022	No Handball Event								
Total	1 / 2	0 Titles	4	3	0	1	118	79	+39

=== IHF World Championship ===
Champions Runners up Third place Fourth place

IHF Youth World Championship record
Year	Round	Position	GP	W	D	L	GS	GA	GD
(Canada) 2006	Did not qualify								
(Slovakia) 2008	Did not qualify								
(Dominican Republic) 2010	Final	Champions	7	7	0	0	247	162	+85
(Montenegro) 2012	Quarterfinals	6th	7	4	0	3	180	175	+5
(North Macedonia) 2014	Eightfinals	9th	9	6	0	3	251	209	+42
(Slovakia) 2016	Quarterfinals	7th	9	6	0	3	238	217	+21
(Poland) 2018	Semifinals	4th	9	4	0	5	223	227	-4
(Croatia) 2020	Cancelled								
(North Macedonia) 2022	Quarterfinals	6th	8	4	1	3	238	206	+32
(China) 2024	Main round	13th	7	4	1	2	194	168	+26
(Romania) 2026	Main round	15th	7	3	0	4	204	196	+8
Total	8 / 10	1 Title	63	38	1	23	1775	1560	+215

=== European Championship ===
Champions Runners up Third place Fourth place

European Championship record
Year	Round	Position	GP	W	D	L	GS	GA	GD
(Hungary) 1992	Didn't Qualify								
(Lithuania) 1994	Didn't Qualify								
(Austria) 1997	Didn't Qualify								
(Germany) 1999	Semifinals	4th							
(Turkey) 2001	Didn't Qualify								
(Russia) 2003	Didn't Qualify								
(Austria) 2005	Preliminary Round	11th							
(Slovakia) 2007	Didn't Qualify								
(Serbia) 2009	Quarterfinals	7th							
(Czech Republic) 2011	Quarterfinals	6th							
(Poland) 2013	Final	Champions							
(North Macedonia) 2015	Quarterfinals	8th							
(Slovakia) 2017	Preliminary Round	9th							
(Slovenia) 2019	Final	2nd							
(Montenegro) 2021	Preliminary Round	12th							
(Montenegro) 2023	Preliminary Round	9th							
Total	10 / 16	1 Title							
