= Russia women's national youth handball team =

Russia

Information
- Association: Handball Federation of Russia

Colours
1st	2nd

Results

Youth Olympic Games
- Appearances: 2 (First in 2010)
- Best result: (silver) Runners up : 2010, 2014

IHF U-18 World Championship
- Appearances: 5 (First in 2008)
- Best result: (gold) Champions : 2008, 2016, 2018

European Championship
- Appearances: ?? (First in 1992)
- Best result: (gold) Champions: 2001, 2003, 2011.
- Last updated on Unknown.

The Russia women's youth national handball team is the national under–17 handball team of Russia. Controlled by the Handball Federation of Russia it represented the country in international matches.

In reaction to the 2022 Russian invasion of Ukraine, the International Handball Federation banned Russian and Belarus athletes and officials, and the European Handball Federation suspended the national teams of Russia and Belarus as well as Russian and Belarusian clubs competing in European handball competitions. Referees, officials, and commission members from Russia and Belarus will not be called upon for future activities. And new organisers will be sought for the YAC 16 EHF Beach Handball EURO and the Qualifier Tournaments for the Beach Handball EURO 2023, which were to be held in Moscow. In addition, it refused to allow competitions to be held in Russia or Belarus. The Russian Handball Federation failed in its appeal against the decision to exclude Russia's teams from continental competition, which was rejected by the European Handball Federation Court of Handball.

== History ==
=== Youth Olympic Games ===
Champions Runners up Third place Fourth place

Youth Olympic Games record
Year	Round	Position	GP	W	D	L	GS	GA	GD
(Singapore) 2010	Final	Runners-up	4	3	0	1	141	89	+52
(China) 2014	Final	Runner-up	4	3	0	1	131	106	+25
Total	2/2	0 titles	8	6	0	2	272	195	+77

=== IHF World Championship ===
Champions Runners up Third place Fourth place

IHF Youth World Championship record
Year	Round	Position	GP	W	D	L	GS	GA	GD
(Canada) 2006	Did not qualify								
(Slovakia) 2008	Final	Champions	7	7	0	0	217	160	+57
(Dominican Republic) 2010	Quarterfinals	7th place	7	5	0	2	215	179	+36
(Montenegro) 2012	Final	Runner-up	7	6	0	1	242	182	+60
(North Macedonia) 2014	Quarterfinals	8th place	9	5	0	4	272	223	+49
(Slovakia) 2016	Final	Champions	9	9	0	0	295	204	+91
(Poland) 2018	Final	Champions	9	9	0	0	293	194	+99
(Croatia) 2020	Cancelled								
(Georgia (country)) 2022	Excluded due to the 2022 Russian invasion of Ukraine								
Total	6/7	3 titles	48	41	0	7	1534	1152	+392

=== European Championship ===
Champions Runners up Third place Fourth place

European Championship record
Year	Round	Position	GP	W	D	L	GS	GA	GD
(Hungary) 1992	Did not participate								
(Lithuania) 1994	Preliminary round	–	5	3	0	2	144	122	+22
(Austria) 1997	Semifinals	3rd place	7	6	0	1	206	158	+48
(Germany) 1999	Final	Runners-up	7	5	0	2	180	163	+17
(Turkey) 2001	Final	Champions	7	7	0	0	201	136	+65
(Russia) 2003	Final	Champions	7	7	0	0	210	163	+47
(Austria) 2005	Intermediate round	9th place	7	5	1	1	201	140	+61
(Slovakia) 2007	Semifinals	4th place	7	4	1	2	197	174	+23
(Serbia) 2009	Final	Runners-up	7	5	0	2	218	181	+37
(Czech Republic) 2011	Final	Champions	7	7	0	0	202	152	+50
(Poland) 2013	Final	Runners-up	7	6	0	1	219	159	+60
(North Macedonia) 2015	Final	Runners-up	7	6	0	1	220	164	+56
(Slovakia) 2017	Main round	5th place	7	4	0	3	172	168	+4
(Slovenia) 2019	Main round	5th place	7	5	1	1	199	173	+26
(Montenegro) 2021	Semifinals	3rd place	7	6	0	1	244	183	+61
Total	14/15	3 titles	96	76	3	17	2813	2236	+577
