= Nikolina Zadravec =

Croatian handball player (born 1997)

Nikolina Kragulj
Personal information
- Nationality: Croatian
- Born: 2 September 1997 (age 29) Čakovec, Croatia
- Height: 1.68 m (5 ft 6 in)

Sport
- Sport: Handball
- Position: Right wing
- Current club: RK Podravka Koprivnica
- Number: 2

Senior clubs
- Years: Team
- –2014: ŽRK Zrinski Čakovec
- 2014–2016: ŽRK Koka Varaždin
- 2016–: RK Podravka Koprivnica
- 2017: → Kristianstad Handboll
National team
Years	Team	Apps	(Gls)
–	Croatia	35	(57)
- Updated on 8 November 2024

Nikolina Kragulj (née Zadravec; born 2 September 1997) is a Croatian handball player for RK Podravka and the Croatian national team.

She participated at the 2016 European Women's Handball Championship.
