= Olivia Mellegård =

Swedish handball player (born 1996)

Personal information
- Nationality: Swedish
- Born: 17 June 1996 (age 30) Gothenburg, Sweden
- Height: 1.77 m (5 ft 10 in)

Sport
- Sport: Handball
- Position: Left wing
- Current club: IK Sävehof

Youth career
- Years: Team
- 2013–2014: Önnereds HK

Senior clubs
- Years: Team
- 2014–2015: Önnereds HK
- 2015–2019: IK Sävehof
- 2019–2022: København Håndbold
- 2022–2024: IK Sävehof
- 2024–: Ikast Håndbold
National team
| Years | Team | Apps | (Gls) |
| 2016– | Sweden | 82 | (179) |
Medal record
Youth Olympic Games
| Bronze medal – third place | 2014 Nanjing |
- Updated on 31. December 2023

Olivia Mellegård (born 17 June 1996) is a Swedish handball player for IK Sävehof and the Swedish national team.

Mellegård comes from a family of handballers. She is the daughter of former handball player Glenn Gustavsson, niece of former handball player Mikael Mellegård, brother of current player Pontus Mellegård and cousin of current player Emil Mellegård.

== Career ==
Mellegård started playing handball at Önnereds HK at the age of 6. In 2013 she was part of the Sweden national team that won the U17 European Championship, where she was part of the all star team.

In 2015 she went to IK Sävehof. A year later she was called up to the Sweden national team. In 2019 she switched to Danish side København Håndbold, but in 2022 she went back to IK Sävehof. Two years later she joined Danish club Ikast Håndbold, where she shared playing time with Lærke Nolsøe.
