= Valentina Vernigorova =

Russian handball player (born 1997)

Personal information
- Full name: Valentina Vernigorova
- Nationality: Russian
- Born: 15 June 1997 (age 29) Volgograd, Russia
- Height: 1.85 m (6 ft 1 in)

Sport
- Sport: Handball
- Position: Right back
- Current club: Kuban
- Number: 87

Senior clubs
- Years: Team
- 2013–2017: Dinamo-Sinara
- 2017-: Kuban
National team
- Years: Team
- 2017-: Russia
Medal record
IHF Junior World Championship
Silver medal – second place	2016 Russia
Youth Olympic Games
Silver medal – second place	2014 Nanjing
European Youth Olympic Festival
Silver medal – second place	2013 Utrecht

Valentina Vernigorova (born 15 June 1997) is a Russian handballer who plays for Dinamo-Sinara and the Russia national team.
