= Germany women's national youth handball team =

Germany

Information
- Association: German Handball Association
- Coach: Eugenius Smits

Colours
1st	2nd

Results

IHF U-18 World Championship
- Appearances: 7 (First in 2010)
- Best result: 2nd (2014)
- Last updated on Unknown.

The Germany women's youth national handball team is the national under-17 handball team of Germany. Controlled by the German Handball Association it represents the country in international matches.

== World Championship record ==
- 2010 – 14th place
- 2014 – 2nd place
- 2016 – 11th place
- 2018 – 5th place
- 2022 – 10th place
- 2024 – 5th place
- 2026 – 13th place
