= Ana Rajković =

Montenegrin handball player (born 1996)

Personal information
- Nationality: Montenegrin
- Born: 4 September 1996 (age 30) Podgorica, Montenegro, FR Yugoslavia
- Height: 1.80 m (5 ft 11 in)

Sport
- Sport: Handball
- Position: Goalkeeper
- Current club: ŽRK Budućnost
- Number: 1
National team
- Years: Team
- –: Montenegro

Ana Rajković (born 4 September 1996) is a Montenegrin handball player who plays for the club Yenimahalle Bld. SK (women's handball).
