= Mercianne Hendo =

Congolese handball player

Personal information
- Nationality: Congolese
- Born: 19 January 1997 (age 29) Congo
- Height: 1.72 m (5 ft 8 in)

Sport
- Sport: Handball
- Position: Right back
- Current club: DGSP Brazzaville
National team
Years	Team	Apps	(Gls)
–	Congo	6	(7)

Mercianne Hendo (born 19 January 1997) is a Congolese handball player for DGSP Brazzaville and the Congolese national team.

She participated at the 2021 World Women's Handball Championship in Spain.
