= Delaila Amega =

Dutch handball player (born 1997)

Personal information
- Nationality: Dutch
- Born: 21 September 1997 (age 29) Heerhugowaard, Netherlands
- Height: 1.72 m (5 ft 8 in)

Sport
- Sport: Handball
- Position: Centre back
- Current club: Borussia Dortmund
- Number: 14

Senior clubs
- Years: Team
- –2014: Westfriesland SEW
- 2014–2016: Virto/Quintus
- 2016–2020: TuS Metzingen
- 2020–2022: Borussia Dortmund
National team
| Years | Team | Apps | (Gls) |
| 2017–2022 | Netherlands | 23 | (33) |
Medal record
World Championship
| Gold medal – first place | 2019 Japan |
European Championship
| Bronze medal – third place | 2018 France |

Delaila Amega (born 21 September 1997) is a Dutch former handball player for Borussia Dortmund and the Dutch national team.

She was part of the Netherlands that surprisingly won gold medals at the 2019 World Women's Handball Championship. She was however not initially part of the team, but was called up to replace the injured Inger Smits.

Since 2022 she has been the coach of the VOC Amsterdam second team.

== International honours ==
- EHF Cup:
  - Semi-finalist: 2017
