= Montenegro women's national youth handball team =

Montenegro

Information
- Association: Handball Federation of Montenegro
- Coach: Miloš Perović

Colours
1st	2nd

Results

IHF U-18 World Championship
- Appearances: 6 (First in 2012)
- Best result: 2nd (2026)
- Last updated on Unknown.

The Montenegro women's youth national handball team is the national under-18 handball team of Montenegro. Controlled by the Handball Federation of Montenegro it represents the country in international matches.

== World Championship record ==
- 2012 – 11th place
- 2014 – 4th place
- 2018 – 17th place
- 2022 – 18th place
- 2024 – 12th place
- 2026 – 2nd place
