= Portugal women's national youth handball team =

Portugal

Information
- Association: Portuguese Handball Federation
- Coach: Sandra Fernandes

Colours
1st	2nd

Results

IHF U-18 World Championship
- Appearances: 4 (First in 2012)
- Best result: 11th (2014)
- Last updated on Unknown.

The Portugal women's youth national handball team is the national under-17 handball team of Portugal. Controlled by the Portuguese Handball Federation it represents the country in international matches.

== World Championship record ==
- 2012 – 10th place
- 2014 – 11th place
- 2022 – 13th place
- 2026 – 17th place
