= Veronika Khardina =

Kazakhstani handball player

Personal information
- Nationality: Kazakhstani
- Born: 29 August 1996 (age 30)
- Height: 1.75 m (5 ft 9 in)

Sport
- Sport: Handball
- Position: Left wing
- Current club: Kaysar Club
National team
Years	Team	Apps	(Gls)
–	Kazakhstan	57	(263)
Medal record
Asian Championship
Bronze medal – third place	2024 India

Veronika Khardina (born 29 August 1996) is a Kazakhstani handball player for Kaysar Club and the Kazakhstani national team.

She competed at the 2015 World Women's Handball Championship in Denmark.
