= Biljanini Izvori Sports Hall =

Orchids indoor sport arena

Coordinates: 42°0′20.64″N 21°25′32.13″E

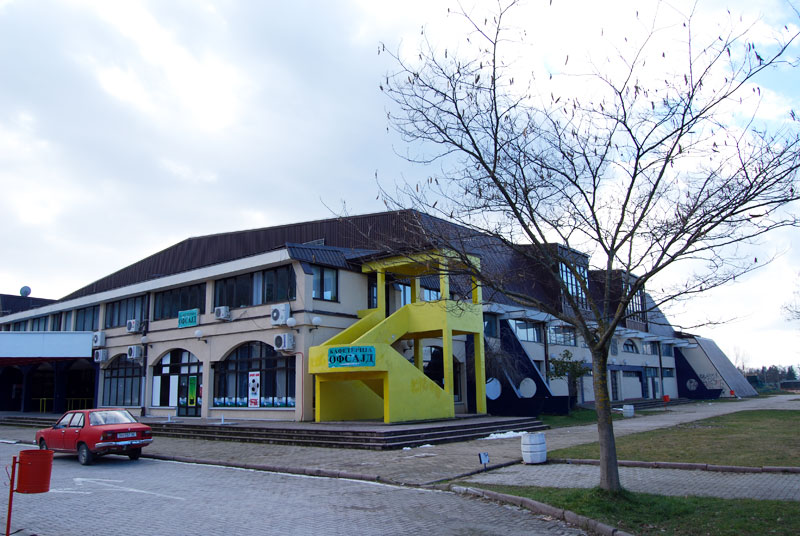
- Location: Ohrid, North Macedonia
- Owner: City of Ohrid
- Capacity: 3,500–,
- Opened: 1998

Tenants
- GRK Ohrid; KK AV Ohrid

The Biljanini Izvori Sports Hall (Macedonian: Спортска сала Билјанини Извори, transliterated Sportska sala Biljanini Izvori) is a multi-functional indoor sports arena. It is located in Ohrid, North Macedonia. The sports hall was inaugurated in August 1998 and has a capacity of 4,000 seats for handball and 4,500 for basketball. It is used by several handball and basketball teams from Ohrid. It was one of two venues used during the 2008 European Women's Handball Championship.

== Notable events ==
- Macedonian handball trophy (women), August 1998
- European Youth Championships in basketball, July–August 2000
- Qualification matches of men's and women's basketball national team
- European Junior Championships in handball
- Balkan Police Championships
- Balkan Youth Olympic Days 2002
- Professional boxing matches
- Men's Junior Handball Championship - 2007
- 2008 European Women's Handball Championship
