= Patrícia Rodrigues =

Portuguese handball player (born 1997)

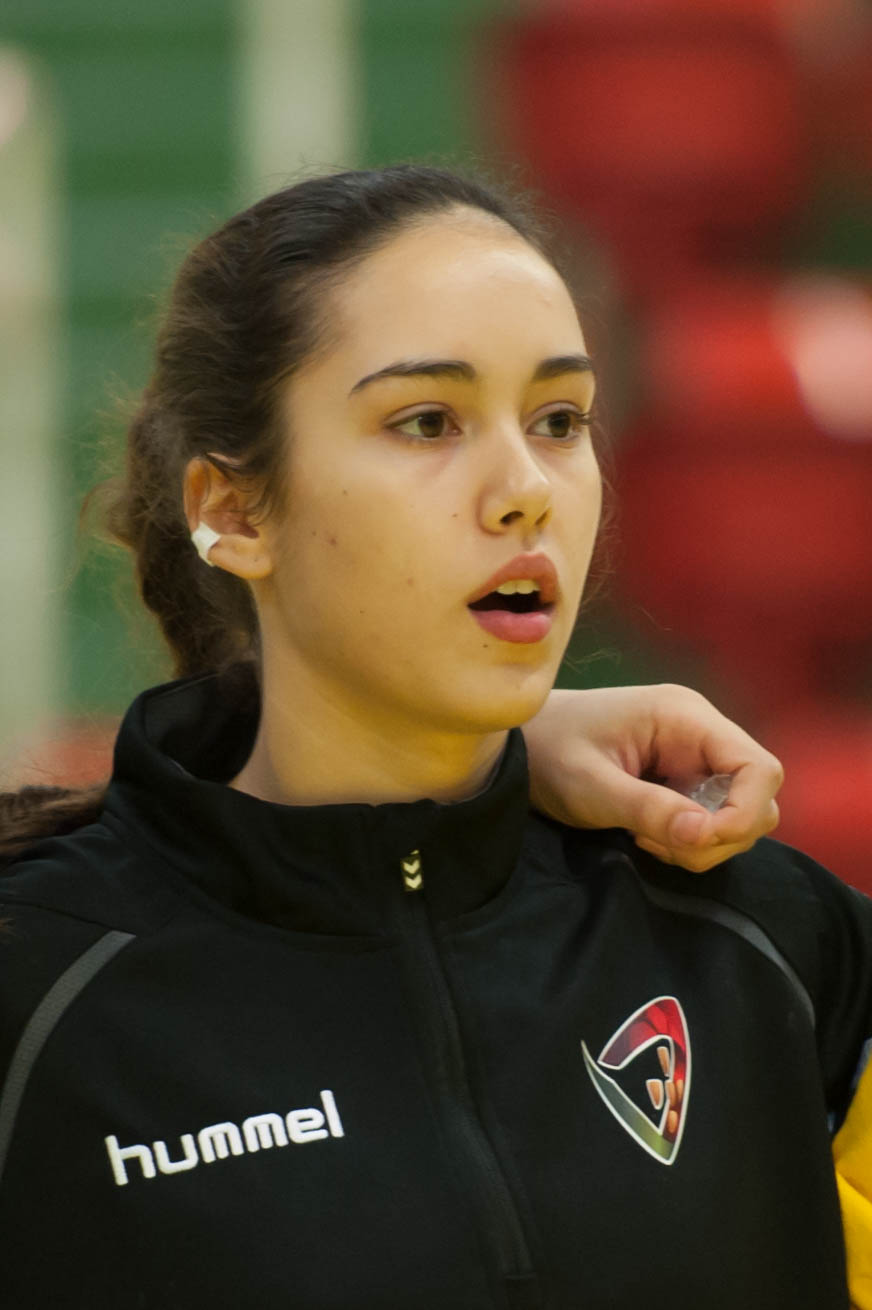

Personal information
- Full name: Patrícia Emidio Rodrigues
- Nationality: Portuguese
- Born: 6 November 1997 (age 28) Coimbra, Portugal
- Height: 1.65 m (5 ft 5 in)

Sport
- Sport: Handball
- Position: Right wing
- Current club: S.L. Benfica
- Number: 19

Senior clubs
- Years: Team
- –2015: JAC Alcanena
- 2015–2019: HSG Blomberg-Lippe
- 2019-2022: S.L. Benfica
- 2022-2024: Madeira Andebol SAD
- 2024-: S.L. Benfica
National team
Years	Team	Apps	(Gls)
2012-	Portugal	30	(98)
- Updated on 21 November 2024

Patrícia Emidio Rodrigues (born 6 November 1997) is a Portuguese handballer who plays for S.L. Benfica and the Portugal national team. She has previously played for Portuguese teams JAC Alcanena and Madeira Andebol SAD and german team HSG Blomberg-Lippe. She won the Portuguese championship in 2022 with S.L. Benfica, before joining league rivals Madeira Andebol SAD. In 2024 she returned to Benfica once again.
