= European Women's U-17 Handball Championship =

International women's youth team handball event

The European Women's Youth Handball Championship is the official competition for youth women handball national teams in Europe, managed by the European Handball Federation. It takes place every two years. Since the 2005 edition, the championship received its current name: EHF European Women's U-17 Handball Championship.

== Medal summary ==
| Year | Host | Final | | | Third place match | | |
| Year | Host | Champion | Score | Runner-up | Third place | Score | Fourth place |
|---|---|---|---|---|---|---|---|
| 1992; Details | Hungary | Norway | 17 – 14 | Denmark | Germany | 14 – 12 | Hungary |
| 1994; Details | Lithuania | Ukraine | 24 – 16 | Czech Republic | Denmark | 18 – 15 | Romania |
| 1997; Details | Austria | Spain | 20 – 11 | Norway | Russia | 30 – 21 | Romania |
| 1999; Details | Germany | Romania | 31 – 26 | Russia | Germany | 25 – 23 | Sweden |
| 2001; Details | Turkey | Russia | 26 – 14 | Germany | Hungary | 21 – 20 | Croatia |
| 2003; Details | Russia | Russia | 28 – 23 | Romania | Hungary | 26 – 20 | Denmark |
| 2005; Details | Austria | Denmark | 29 – 26 | Romania | France | 30 – 21 | Slovenia |
| 2007; Details | Slovakia | France | 30 – 20 | Spain | Netherlands | 32 – 27 | Russia |
| 2009; Details | Serbia | Denmark | 24 – 23 | Russia | Norway | 40 – 28 | France |
| 2011; Details | Czech Republic | Russia | 24 – 23 | Denmark | Norway | 28 – 16 | Hungary |
| 2013; Details | Poland | Sweden | 26 – 24 | Russia | Denmark | 42 – 28 | Portugal |
| 2015; Details | (North Macedonia); FYR Macedonia | Denmark | 25 – 24 | Russia | Hungary | 34 – 31 | Romania |
| 2017; Details | Slovakia | Germany | 23 – 18 | Norway | Hungary | 32 – 18 | France |
| 2019; Details | Slovenia | Hungary | 28 – 24 | Sweden | France | 28 – 21 | Denmark |
| 2021; Details | Montenegro | Hungary | 25 – 19 | Germany | Russia | 37 – 30 | Denmark |
| 2023; Details | Montenegro | France | 24 – 19 | Denmark | Germany | 31 – 27 | Croatia |
| 2025; Details | Montenegro | Slovakia | 34 – 30 | Croatia | Montenegro | 22 – 20 | Spain |

== Medal table ==
| Rank | Nation | Gold | Silver | Bronze | Total |
|---|---|---|---|---|---|
| 1 | Russia | 3 | 4 | 2 | 9 |
| 2 | Denmark | 3 | 3 | 2 | 8 |
| 3 | Hungary | 2 | 0 | 4 | 6 |
| 4 | France | 2 | 0 | 2 | 4 |
| 5 | Germany | 1 | 2 | 3 | 6 |
| 6 | Norway | 1 | 2 | 2 | 5 |
| 7 | Romania | 1 | 2 | 0 | 3 |
| 8 | Spain | 1 | 1 | 0 | 2 |
| 8 | Sweden | 1 | 1 | 0 | 2 |
| 10 | Slovakia | 1 | 0 | 0 | 1 |
| 10 | Ukraine | 1 | 0 | 0 | 1 |
| 12 | Croatia | 0 | 1 | 0 | 1 |
| 12 | Czech Republic | 0 | 1 | 0 | 1 |
| 14 | Montenegro | 0 | 0 | 1 | 1 |
| 14 | Netherlands | 0 | 0 | 1 | 1 |
| Totals (15 entries) | | 17 | 17 | 17 | 51 |

== See also ==
- Youth World Championship
- Junior European Championship
- Junior World Championship
