= Manuela Paulino =

Angolan handball player

Personal information
- Full name: Manuela Correia Paulino
- Nationality: Angolan
- Born: 15 April 1996 (age 30)
- Height: 1.70 m (5 ft 7 in)

Sport
- Sport: Handball
- Position: Left back
- Current club: Petro de Luanda
- Number: 9
National team
Years	Team	Apps	(Gls)
–	Angola	3	(0)

Manuela Correia Paulino, nicknamed Nelma, (born 15 April 1996) is an Angolan female handball player for Petro de Luanda and the Angolan national team.

She represented Angola at the 2017 World Women's Handball Championship.
