= IHF Women's U18 Handball World Championship =

International women's youth team handball tournament

- Current season, competition or edition: 2026 IHF Women's U18 Handball World Championship
- Sport: Handball
- Founded: 2005
- Founder: International Handball Federation
- First season: 2006
- No. of teams: 24
- Continents: 5
- Most recent champion: Spain (2nd title)
- Most titles: Russia (3 titles)

The IHF Women's U18 Handball World Championship (or the IHF Women's Youth World Championship) is the official competition for women's national handball teams under age 18. It has been organized by the International Handball Federation since 2006. It takes place every two years in even years.

== Tournaments ==
Year	Host country	Gold medal game			Bronze medal game		
Year	Host country	Gold	Score	Silver	Bronze	Score	Fourth place
2006; Details	Canada	Denmark	36–33	South Korea	Romania	30–28	France
2008; Details	Slovakia	Russia	27–22	Serbia	Denmark	24–21	France
2010; Details	Dominican Republic	Sweden	34–29	Norway	Netherlands	27–26	France
2012; Details	Montenegro	Denmark	27–26	Russia	Norway	36–30	Romania
2014; Details	(North Macedonia); Macedonia	Romania	32–21	Germany	Denmark	20–19	Montenegro
2016; Details	Slovakia	Russia	30–22	Denmark	South Korea	32–30	Norway
2018; Details	Poland	Russia	29–27	Hungary	South Korea	34–27	Sweden
2020; Details	Croatia	Cancelled due to the COVID-19 pandemic			Cancelled due to the COVID-19 pandemic		
2022; Details	North Macedonia	South Korea	31–28	Denmark	Hungary	27–26	Netherlands
2024; Details	China	Spain	23–22	Denmark	Hungary	25–24	France
2026; Details	Romania	Spain	26–23	Montenegro	Denmark	23–19	Egypt

== Medal table ==
Rank	Nation	Gold	Silver	Bronze	Total
1	Russia	3	1	0	4
2	Denmark	2	3	3	8
3	Spain	2	0	0	2
4	South Korea	1	1	2	4
5	Romania	1	0	1	2
6	Sweden	1	0	0	1
7	Hungary	0	1	2	3
8	Norway	0	1	1	2
9	Germany	0	1	0	1
9	Montenegro	0	1	0	1
9	Serbia	0	1	0	1
12	Netherlands	0	0	1	1
Totals (12 entries)		10	10	10	30

== Participating nations ==
Nation	(Canada) 2006	(Slovakia) 2008	(Dominican Republic) 2010	(Montenegro) 2012	(North Macedonia) 2014	(Slovakia) 2016	(Poland) 2018	~~(Croatia)~~ ~~2020~~	(North Macedonia) 2022	(China) 2024	(Romania) 2026	Years
Algeria									32nd		31st	2
Angola		8th	10th	15th	20th	10th	21st			26th	27th	8
Argentina	6th	11th	17th		12th	18th	20th		25th	18th	23rd	9
Austria							15th		23rd	20th		3
Brazil	9th	10th	13th	12th	7th	12th			15th	11th	19th	9
Canada	10th									31st	26th	3
Chile						22nd	18th			29th		3
China					22nd	20th	22nd			15th	7th	5
Chinese Taipei										22nd		1
Croatia				14th	10th	8th	12th		11th	7th	18th	7
Czech Republic				13th					22nd	9th	21st	4
Denmark	1st	3rd	6th	1st	3rd	2nd	6th		2nd	2nd	3rd	10
Dominican Republic			8th									1
DR Congo			18th	18th	23rd	23rd						4
Egypt						9th	23rd		7th	21st	4th	5
Faroe Islands									19th			1
Fiji											32nd	1
France	4th	4th	4th	7th	16th	6th	10th		5th	4th	10th	10
Germany			14th		2nd	11th	5th		10th	5th	13th	7
Greenland										32nd		1
Guinea									29th	30th	25th	3
Hong Kong		15th										1
Hungary			11th	5th	15th	5th	2nd		3rd	3rd	8th	8
Iceland									8th	25th		2
India									30th	28th		2
Iran									16th			1
Japan	7th	13th	15th	8th	14th	17th	14th			8th	9th	9
Kazakhstan			16th	16th	21st	19th	24th		27th	27th	24th	8
Kosovo										23rd		1
Mexico											28th	1
Montenegro				11th	4th		17th		18th	12th	2nd	6
Netherlands		9th	3rd	10th	6th		7th		4th	16th	11th	8
Nigeria										24th		1
North Macedonia					17th				12th			2
Norway			2nd	3rd	13th	4th	11th		9th	10th		7
Paraguay				20th	19th	21st					WD	3
Poland							13th					1
Portugal				19th	11th				13th		17th	4
Puerto Rico		14th										1
Qatar		16th										1
Romania	3rd			4th	1st	14th	9th		14th	17th	12th	8
Russia		1st	7th	2nd	8th	1st	1st		DQ			6
Senegal									28th			1
Serbia		2nd								6th	22nd	3
Slovakia		7th				13th	19th		26th		6th	5
Slovenia	5th					16th			20th		16th	4
South Korea	2nd	6th	9th	9th	5th	3rd	3rd		1st	19th	14th	10
Spain		5th	5th			15th	8th		17th	1st	1st	7
Sweden			1st	6th	9th	7th	4th		6th	13th	15th	8
Switzerland									21st	14th	5th	3
Thailand	8th		19th									2
Tunisia	11th	12th			18th		16th				20th	5
Uruguay			12th	17th					31st		29th	4
Uzbekistan					24th	24th			24th		30th	4
Total	11	16	19	20	24	24	24		32	32	32	

== See also ==
- IHF Women's U20 Handball World Championship
