= 2017 European Women's U-17 Handball Championship =

2017 European U-17 Handball Championship
Tournament details
- Host country: Slovakia
- Dates: August 10–August 20
- Teams: 16 (from 1 confederation)

Final positions
- Champions: Germany
- Runners-up: Norway
- Third place: Hungary
- Fourth place: France

Tournament statistics
- Top scorer(s): Zoe Sprengers (NED)

Awards
- Best player: Aimée von Pereira (GER)

The 2017 European Women's U-17 Handball Championship was the 13th edition, which took place in Slovakia. Germany won the first title by defeating Norway in the final.

== Qualified teams ==
- Austria
- Croatia
- Czech Republic
- Denmark
- Spain
- France
- Germany
- Hungary
- Montenegro
- Netherlands
- Norway
- Romania
- Russia
- Serbia
- Slovakia
- Sweden

== Preliminary round ==
Team advanced to the main round

=== Group A ===
Pos	Team	Pld	W	D	L	GF	GA	GD	Pts
1	Germany	3	3	0	0	78	51	+27	6
2	Russia	3	2	0	1	76	71	+5	4
3	Netherlands	3	1	0	2	90	96	−6	2
4	Austria	3	0	0	3	66	92	−26	0

Rules for classification: 1) points; 2) head-to-head points; 3) head-to-head goal difference; 4) head-to-head number of goals scored; 5) Goal difference.

=== Group B ===
Pos	Team	Pld	W	D	L	GF	GA	GD	Pts
1	Hungary	3	3	0	0	83	71	+12	6
2	Denmark	3	1	0	2	71	64	+7	2
3	Montenegro	3	1	0	2	59	69	−10	2
4	Croatia	3	1	0	2	58	67	−9	2

Rules for classification: 1) points; 2) head-to-head points; 3) head-to-head goal difference; 4) head-to-head number of goals scored; 5) Goal difference.

=== Group C ===
Pos	Team	Pld	W	D	L	GF	GA	GD	Pts
1	Romania	3	2	1	0	77	71	+6	5
2	France	3	1	1	1	70	68	+2	3
3	Sweden	3	1	1	1	67	66	+1	3
4	Czech Republic	3	0	1	2	65	74	−9	1

Rules for classification: 1) points; 2) head-to-head points; 3) head-to-head goal difference; 4) head-to-head number of goals scored; 5) Goal difference.

=== Group D ===
Pos	Team	Pld	W	D	L	GF	GA	GD	Pts
1	Norway	3	2	0	1	73	66	+7	4
2	Spain	3	2	0	1	86	73	+13	4
3	Slovakia	3	1	1	1	68	77	−9	3
4	Serbia	3	0	1	2	55	0	+55	1

Rules for classification: 1) points; 2) head-to-head points; 3) head-to-head goal difference; 4) head-to-head number of goals scored; 5) Goal difference.

== Knockout stage ==
Semi-finals
18 August
Hungary	21
Norway	26
18 August
France	21
Germany	27

Final
20 August
Norway	18
Germany	23
Third place
20 August
Hungary	32
France	18

=== Third place game ===
20 August 2017; 15:00	Hungary	32–18	France	Attendance: 700
20 August 2017; 15:00		(13–9)		Attendance: 700
20 August 2017; 15:00		(Report)		Attendance: 700

=== Final ===
20 August 2017; 17:30	Norway	18–23	Germany	Attendance: 1.600
20 August 2017; 17:30		(12–9)		Attendance: 1.600
20 August 2017; 17:30		(Report)		Attendance: 1.600

== Rankings and awardees ==
=== Final standings ===
Rank	Team
Gold medal	Germany
Silver medal	Norway
Bronze medal	Hungary
4	France
5	Russia
6	Denmark
7	Romania
8	Spain
9	Sweden
10	Netherlands
11	Montenegro
12	Slovakia
13	Croatia
14	Austria
15	Czech Republic
16	Serbia

2017 Women's Youth Handball European Champions

Germany
