= 2025 South and Central American Women's Youth Handball Championship =

Tournament details
- Host country: Paraguay
- Venue: 1 (in 1 host city)
- Dates: 17–21 November
- Teams: 9 (from 1 confederation)

Final positions
- Champions: Argentina (1st title)
- Runners-up: Brazil
- Third place: Uruguay
- Fourth place: Paraguay

Tournament statistics
- Matches played: 19
- Goals scored: 1,101 (57.95 per match)
- Top scorer(s): (Guatemala) Leidy Juárez (42 goals)

The 2025 South and Central American Women's Youth Handball Championship took place in Asunción, Paraguay, from 17 to 21 November 2025. It acted as the South and Central American qualifying tournament for the 2026 IHF Women's U18 Handball World Championship.

== Qualification ==
Competition	Dates	Host	Vacancies	Qualified
Automatic qualifiers			5	Argentina; Brazil; Chile; Paraguay; Uruguay
IHF Trophy South and Central America – Central American Zone	20–24 May 2025	(Honduras) Tegucigalpa	2	Costa Rica; Guatemala
IHF Trophy South and Central America – South America Zone	23–27 July 2025	(Peru) Lima	2	Peru; Venezuela

== Preliminary round ==
All times are local (UTC–3).

=== Group A ===
Pos	Team	Pld	W	D	L	GF	GA	GD	Pts	Qualification
1	Brazil	2	2	0	0	97	27	+70	4	Semifinals
2	Peru	2	1	0	1	58	75	−17	2	
3	Costa Rica	2	0	0	2	39	92	−53	0	

Source: SCAHC
Rules for classification: 1) Points; 2) Head-to-head points; 3) Head-to-head goal difference; 4) Head-to-head goals scored; 5) Goal difference; 6) Goals scored; 7) Draw.

17 November 2025; 14:00	Peru	42–28	Costa Rica	SND Arena, Asunción
17 November 2025; 14:00		(21–13)		SND Arena, Asunción

18 November 2025; 15:00	Costa Rica	11–50	Brazil	SND Arena, Asunción
18 November 2025; 15:00		(5–23)		SND Arena, Asunción

19 November 2025; 16:30	Brazil	47–16	Peru	SND Arena, Asunción
19 November 2025; 16:30		(22–4)		SND Arena, Asunción

=== Group B ===
Pos	Team	Pld	W	D	L	GF	GA	GD	Pts	Qualification
1	Argentina	2	2	0	0	84	34	+50	4	Semifinals
2	Venezuela	2	1	0	1	48	61	−13	2	
3	Guatemala	2	0	0	2	40	77	−37	0	

Source: SCAHC
Rules for classification: 1) Points; 2) Head-to-head points; 3) Head-to-head goal difference; 4) Head-to-head goals scored; 5) Goal difference; 6) Goals scored; 7) Draw.

17 November 2025; 16:30	Guatemala	24–30	Venezuela	SND Arena, Asunción
17 November 2025; 16:30		(14–13)		SND Arena, Asunción

18 November 2025; 17:30	Venezuela	18–37	Argentina	SND Arena, Asunción
18 November 2025; 17:30		(8–19)		SND Arena, Asunción
18 November 2025; 17:30		Report		SND Arena, Asunción

19 November 2025; 14:00	Argentina	47–16	Guatemala	SND Arena, Asunción
19 November 2025; 14:00		(21–4)		SND Arena, Asunción
19 November 2025; 14:00		Report		SND Arena, Asunción

=== Group C ===
Pos	Team	Pld	W	D	L	GF	GA	GD	Pts	Qualification
1	Uruguay	2	2	0	0	73	60	+13	4	Semifinals
2	Paraguay (H)	2	1	0	1	54	54	0	2	Semifinals
3	Chile	2	0	0	2	45	58	−13	0	

Source: SCAHC
Rules for classification: 1) Points; 2) Head-to-head points; 3) Head-to-head goal difference; 4) Head-to-head goals scored; 5) Goal difference; 6) Goals scored; 7) Draw.
(H) Hosts

17 November 2025; 19:00	Uruguay	35–34	Paraguay	SND Arena, Asunción
17 November 2025; 19:00		(19–18)		SND Arena, Asunción

18 November 2025; 20:00	Paraguay	20–19	Chile	SND Arena, Asunción
18 November 2025; 20:00		(8–13)		SND Arena, Asunción

19 November 2025; 19:00	Chile	26–38	Uruguay	SND Arena, Asunción
19 November 2025; 19:00		(10–15)		SND Arena, Asunción

=== Ranking ===
Rank	Grp	Team	Pos	Pts	GD	GF	Qualification
1	A	Brazil	1	4	+70	97	Semifinals
2	B	Argentina	1	4	+50	84	Semifinals
3	C	Uruguay	1	4	+13	73	Semifinals
4	C	Paraguay	2	2	0	54	Semifinals
5	B	Venezuela	2	2	−13	48	5–6th place semifinals
6	A	Peru	2	2	−17	58	5–6th place semifinals
7	C	Chile	3	0	−13	45	5–6th place semifinals
8	B	Guatemala	3	0	−37	40	5–6th place quarterfinal
9	A	Costa Rica	3	0	−53	39	5–6th place quarterfinal

Rules for classification: 1) position in the group; 2) points; 3) goal difference; 4) number of goals scored for.

== Knockout stage ==
=== Bracket ===
Championship bracket

Semi-finals
20 November
2 Argentina	32
3 Uruguay	25
20 November
1 Brazil	29
4 Paraguay	27

Final
21 November
Argentina	23
Brazil	22
Third place
21 November
Uruguay	26
Paraguay	23

Fifth place bracket

5–6th place quarterfinal
20 November
8 Guatemala	29
9 Costa Rica	21

5–6th place semifinals
20 November
6 Peru	22
7 Chile	37
20 November
5 Venezuela	27
8/9 Guatemala	16

Fifth place
21 November
Chile	32
Venezuela	31

Seventh place bracket

7–9th place semifinal
21 November
Costa Rica	24
Peru	49

Seventh place
21 November
Guatemala (pen)	30 (5)
Peru	30 (3)

=== 5–6th place quarterfinal ===
20 November 2025; 11:00	Guatemala	29–21	Costa Rica	SND Arena, Asunción
20 November 2025; 11:00		(16–7)		SND Arena, Asunción

=== 5–6th place semifinals ===
20 November 2025; 13:00	Peru	22–37	Chile	SND Arena, Asunción
20 November 2025; 13:00		(11–21)		SND Arena, Asunción

20 November 2025; 17:00	Venezuela	27–16	Guatemala	SND Arena, Asunción
20 November 2025; 17:00		(17–9)		SND Arena, Asunción

=== Semifinals ===
20 November 2025; 15:00	Argentina	32–25	Uruguay	SND Arena, Asunción; Attendance: 180; Referees: Dezembro, Gonçalves (BRA)
20 November 2025; 15:00	Quiroz 9	(15–9)	Leita 7	SND Arena, Asunción; Attendance: 180; Referees: Dezembro, Gonçalves (BRA)
20 November 2025; 15:00	1× (yellow card) 4× (suspension)	Report	5× (suspension)	SND Arena, Asunción; Attendance: 180; Referees: Dezembro, Gonçalves (BRA)

20 November 2025; 19:00	Brazil	29–27	Paraguay	SND Arena, Asunción
20 November 2025; 19:00		(11–14)		SND Arena, Asunción

=== 7–9th place semifinal ===
21 November 2025; 11:00	Costa Rica	24–49	Peru	SND Arena, Asunción
21 November 2025; 11:00		(6–20)		SND Arena, Asunción

=== Seventh place game ===
21 November 2025
17:00
Guatemala
35–33
Peru
SND Arena, Asunción

(12–13)

FT: 30–30 Pen: 5–3

=== Fifth place game ===
21 November 2025; 13:00	Chile	32–31	Venezuela	SND Arena, Asunción
21 November 2025; 13:00		(12–17)		SND Arena, Asunción

=== Third place game ===
21 November 2025; 15:00	Uruguay	26–23	Paraguay	SND Arena, Asunción
21 November 2025; 15:00		(14–11)		SND Arena, Asunción

=== Final ===
21 November 2025; 19:00	Argentina	23–22	Brazil	SND Arena, Asunción; Attendance: 520; Referees: Araujo, Perdomo (URU)
21 November 2025; 19:00	Quiroz 7	(9–12)	Monteiro 6	SND Arena, Asunción; Attendance: 520; Referees: Araujo, Perdomo (URU)
21 November 2025; 19:00	1× (yellow card) 3× (suspension)	Report	5× (suspension) 1× (red card)	SND Arena, Asunción; Attendance: 520; Referees: Araujo, Perdomo (URU)

== Final standing ==
Rank	Team
1st place, gold medalist(s)	Argentina
2nd place, silver medalist(s)	Brazil
3rd place, bronze medalist(s)	Uruguay
4	Paraguay
5	Chile
6	Venezuela
7	Guatemala
8	Peru
9	Costa Rica

Qualified for the 2026 U18 World Championship
Qualified for the 2026 IHF Inter-Continental Trophy
