= Handball at the Summer Youth Olympics =

- Governing body: IHF
- Events: 2 (men: 1; women: 1)

Games
- 2010; 2014; 2018; 2026

Handball was inducted at the Youth Olympic Games at the inaugural edition in 2010 for both boys and girls.

From the 2018 edition in Buenos Aires, beach handball replaced handball.

== Boys ==
=== Summaries ===
Year	Host	Event	Gold medal game			Bronze medal game
Year	Host	Event	Gold medalist	Score	Silver medalist	Bronze medalist	Score	Fourth place
2010; Details	Singapore	Handball	Egypt	35 – 25	South Korea	France	40 – 27	Brazil
2014; Details	Nanjing	Handball	Slovenia	31 – 25	Egypt	Norway	33 – 25	Qatar
2018; Details	Buenos Aires	Beach handball	Spain	2 – 1	Portugal	Argentina	2 – 0	Croatia
2026; Details	Dakar	Beach handball	Germany	2 – 0	Brazil	Senegal	2 – 1	Hungary

=== Team appearances ===
Team	2010	2014	2018	2026
Argentina	-	-	3rd	–
Brazil	4th	5th	-	2nd
Chinese Taipei	-	-	9th	–
Cook Islands	6th	–	-	7th
Croatia	-	-	4th	–
Egypt	1st	2nd	-	–
France	3rd	–	-	–
Germany	–	–	–	1st
Hungary	-	-	5th	4th
Italy	-	-	8th	–
Mauritius	-	-	12th	–
Norway	–	3rd	-	–
Paraguay	-	-	11th	–
Portugal	-	-	2nd	–
Puerto Rico	–	–	–	8th
Qatar	–	4th	-	–
Senegal		–	-	3rd
Singapore	5th	–	-	–
Slovenia	–	1st	-	–
South Korea	2nd	–	-	–
Spain	-	–	1st	–
Thailand	-	–	6th	6th
Tunisia	–	6th	-	5th
Uruguay	-	–	10th	–
Venezuela	-	–	7th	–
Total teams	6	6	12	8

== Girls ==
=== Summaries ===
Year	Host	Event	Gold medal game			Bronze medal game
Year	Host	Event	Gold medalist	Score	Silver medalist	Bronze medalist	Score	Fourth place
2010; Details	Singapore	Handball	Denmark	28 – 26	Russia	Brazil	45 – 23	Kazakhstan
2014; Details	Nanjing	Handball	South Korea	32 – 31	Russia	Sweden	23 – 16	Brazil
2018; Details	Buenos Aires	Beach handball	Argentina	2 – 0	Croatia	Hungary	2 – 0	Netherlands
2026; Details	Dakar	Beach handball	Uruguay	2 – 1	Spain	Senegal	2 – 1	France

=== Team appearances ===
Team	2010	2014	2018	2026
American Samoa	-	–	11th	–
Angola	5th	5th	-	–
Argentina	-	–	1st	–
Australia	6th	–	-	–
Brazil	3rd	4th	-	–
China	–	6th	-	7th
Chinese Taipei	-	–	6th	–
Croatia	-	–	2nd	5th
Denmark	1st	–	-	–
France	–	–	–	4th
Hong Kong	-	-	10th	–
Hungary	-	-	3rd	–
Kazakhstan	4th	–	-	–
Kenya	–	–	–	8th
Mauritius	-	-	12th	–
Mexico	–	–	–	6th
Netherlands	-	-	4th	–
Paraguay	-	-	5th	–
Russia	2nd	2nd	7th	–
Senegal	–	–	–	3rd
South Korea	–	1st	-	–
Spain	–	–	–	2nd
Sweden	–	3rd	-	–
Turkey	-	-	9th	–
Uruguay	–	–	–	1st
Venezuela	-	-	8th	–
Total teams	6	6	12	8

== Medal table ==
As of the 2026 Summer Youth Olympics.

Rank	Nation	Gold	Silver	Bronze	Total
1	Egypt	1	1	0	2
1	South Korea	1	1	0	2
1	Spain	1	1	0	2
4	Argentina	1	0	1	2
5	Denmark	1	0	0	1
5	Germany	1	0	0	1
5	Slovenia	1	0	0	1
5	Uruguay	1	0	0	1
9	Russia	0	2	0	2
10	Brazil	0	1	1	2
11	Croatia	0	1	0	1
11	Portugal	0	1	0	1
13	Senegal	0	0	2	2
14	France	0	0	1	1
14	Hungary	0	0	1	1
14	Norway	0	0	1	1
14	Sweden	0	0	1	1
Totals (17 entries)		8	8	8	24

== See also ==
- Handball at the Summer Olympics
