= 2022 IHF Women's U18 Handball World Championship =

Tournament details
- Host country: North Macedonia
- Venues: 3 (in 1 host city)
- Dates: 30 July – 10 August
- Teams: 32 (from 4 confederations)

Final positions
- Champions: South Korea (1st title)
- Runners-up: Denmark
- Third place: Hungary
- Fourth place: Netherlands

Tournament statistics
- Matches played: 114
- Goals scored: 6,557 (57.52 per match)
- Top scorers: (Denmark) Julie Scaglione (62 goals)

Awards
- Best player: (South Korea) Kim Min-seo

The 2022 IHF Women's U18 Handball World Championship was the ninth edition of the IHF Women's U18 Handball World Championship, held from 30 July to 10 August 2022 in Skopje, North Macedonia under the aegis of the International Handball Federation (IHF). Originally scheduled to be held in Tbilisi, Georgia, it was moved to North Macedonia in April 2022 due to uncertainty because of the 2022 Russian invasion of Ukraine and the safety of the tournament held in Georgia.

South Korea won their first-ever title with a 31–28 win over Denmark in the final.

== Bidding process ==
Only Georgia entered bid for hosting the tournament. The tournament was awarded to Georgia by IHF Council in its meeting held in Cairo, Egypt on 28 February 2020.

== Qualification ==
| Competition | Dates | Host | Vacancies | Qualified |
|---|---|---|---|---|
| IHF Council Meeting (host nation) | 28 February 2020 | (Egypt) Cairo | 1 | North Macedonia |
| 2021 European U-17 Championship | 5–15 August 2021 | (Montenegro) Podgorica | 13 | Croatia; Czech Republic; Denmark; France; Germany; Hungary; Montenegro; Norway; Portugal; Romania; ~~Russia~~; Slovenia; Switzerland; Sweden |
| 2021 U-17 EHF Championship | 6–15 August 2021 | (Georgia (country)) Tbilisi | 1 | Netherlands |
| 2021 U-17 EHF Championship | 7–15 August 2021 | (Lithuania) Klaipėda | 0 | None |
| 2022 African Youth Championship | 27 February – 4 March 2022 | (Guinea) Conakry | 3 | Algeria; Egypt; Guinea |
| 2022 Asian Youth Championship | 18–25 March 2022 | (Kazakhstan) Almaty | 2 | Iran; Kazakhstan |
| 2022 South and Central American Youth Championship | 26–30 April 2022 | (Brazil) Taubaté | 3 | Argentina; Brazil; Uruguay |
| Invited/Substitute | | | 9 | Austria; Faroe Islands; Iceland; India; Senegal; Slovakia; South Korea; Spain; Uzbekistan |

- Russia was excluded due to the 2022 Russian invasion of Ukraine.
- Slovenia replaced Georgia.

== Draw ==
The draw was held on 2 June 2022 at Basel, Switzerland.

=== Seeding ===
| Pot 1 | Pot 2 | Pot 3 | Pot 4 |
|---|---|---|---|
| Hungary; Germany; Iran; Denmark; Croatia; Norway; Romania; Montenegro | Switzerland; Portugal; France; Sweden; North Macedonia; Czech Republic; Kazakhstan; Netherlands | Egypt; Austria; Brazil; Slovakia; Argentina; Guinea; Uzbekistan; Algeria | South Korea; India; Senegal; Uruguay; Faroe Islands; Iceland; Slovenia; Spain |

== Preliminary round ==
All times are local (UTC+2).

=== Group A ===
| Pos | Team | Pld | W | D | L | GF | GA | GD | Pts | Qualification |
|---|---|---|---|---|---|---|---|---|---|---|
| 1 | Iceland | 3 | 2 | 1 | 0 | 82 | 53 | +29 | 5 | Main round |
| 2 | Sweden | 3 | 2 | 0 | 1 | 100 | 76 | +24 | 4 | Main round |
| 3 | Montenegro | 3 | 1 | 1 | 1 | 80 | 63 | +17 | 3 | Presidents Cup |
| 4 | Algeria | 3 | 0 | 0 | 3 | 64 | 134 | −70 | 0 | Presidents Cup |

Source: IHF
Rules for classification: 1) points; 2) head-to-head points; 3) head-to-head goal difference; 4) head-to-head number of goals scored; 5) goal difference.

| 30 July 2022; 10:30 | Montenegro | 38–16 | Algeria | Boris Trajkovski Sports Center, Skopje; Attendance: 100; Referees: Duplii, Pobedrina (UKR) |
| 30 July 2022; 10:30 | Micevski, Pavićević 6 | (20–7) | Yelles 3 | Boris Trajkovski Sports Center, Skopje; Attendance: 100; Referees: Duplii, Pobedrina (UKR) |
| 30 July 2022; 10:30 | 1× (yellow card) 5× (suspension) | Report | 7× (suspension) | Boris Trajkovski Sports Center, Skopje; Attendance: 100; Referees: Duplii, Pobedrina (UKR) |

| 30 July 2022; 12:30 | Sweden | 17–22 | Iceland | Jane Sandanski Arena, Skopje; Attendance: 55; Referees: Altmár, Horváth (HUN) |
| 30 July 2022; 12:30 | Kylberg 7 | (9–11) | Ágústsdóttir, Þorkelsdóttir 5 | Jane Sandanski Arena, Skopje; Attendance: 55; Referees: Altmár, Horváth (HUN) |
| 30 July 2022; 12:30 | 5× (suspension) | Report | 1× (yellow card) 3× (suspension) | Jane Sandanski Arena, Skopje; Attendance: 55; Referees: Altmár, Horváth (HUN) |

| 31 July 2022; 14:00 | Sweden | 54–30 | Algeria | Boris Trajkovski Sports Center, Skopje; Referees: Reyes, Zuñiga (CUB) |
| 31 July 2022; 14:00 | Huselius 12 | (24–13) | Choudani 9 | Boris Trajkovski Sports Center, Skopje; Referees: Reyes, Zuñiga (CUB) |
| 31 July 2022; 14:00 | 1× (yellow card) 6× (suspension) | Report | 5× (suspension) | Boris Trajkovski Sports Center, Skopje; Referees: Reyes, Zuñiga (CUB) |

| 31 July 2022; 18:20 | Iceland | 18–18 | Montenegro | Jane Sandanski Arena, Skopje; Attendance: 250; Referees: Sá, Sá (POR) |
| 31 July 2022; 18:20 | Ágústsdóttir 6 | (11–11) | Vukčević 5 | Jane Sandanski Arena, Skopje; Attendance: 250; Referees: Sá, Sá (POR) |
| 31 July 2022; 18:20 | 2× (yellow card) 5× (suspension) | Report | 4× (suspension) | Jane Sandanski Arena, Skopje; Attendance: 250; Referees: Sá, Sá (POR) |

| 2 August 2022; 12:30 | Algeria | 18–42 | Iceland | Jane Sandanski Arena, Skopje; Attendance: 80; Referees: Magalhães, Godoy (BRA) |
| 2 August 2022; 12:30 | Sadi 5 | (8–23) | Ágústsdóttir, Sigsteinsdóttir 6 | Jane Sandanski Arena, Skopje; Attendance: 80; Referees: Magalhães, Godoy (BRA) |
| 2 August 2022; 12:30 | 2× (yellow card) 7× (suspension) | Report | 1× (yellow card) | Jane Sandanski Arena, Skopje; Attendance: 80; Referees: Magalhães, Godoy (BRA) |

| 2 August 2022; 20:30 | Montenegro | 24–29 | Sweden | Jane Sandanski Arena, Skopje; Attendance: 95; Referees: Burgos, Delgado (ARG) |
| 2 August 2022; 20:30 | Micevski 5 | (10–13) | Huselius 8 | Jane Sandanski Arena, Skopje; Attendance: 95; Referees: Burgos, Delgado (ARG) |
| 2 August 2022; 20:30 | 2× (suspension) | Report | 5× (suspension) | Jane Sandanski Arena, Skopje; Attendance: 95; Referees: Burgos, Delgado (ARG) |

=== Group B ===
| Pos | Team | Pld | W | D | L | GF | GA | GD | Pts | Qualification |
|---|---|---|---|---|---|---|---|---|---|---|
| 1 | North Macedonia (H) | 3 | 3 | 0 | 0 | 102 | 62 | +40 | 6 | Main round |
| 2 | Iran | 3 | 2 | 0 | 1 | 105 | 91 | +14 | 4 | Main round |
| 3 | Senegal | 3 | 1 | 0 | 2 | 76 | 103 | −27 | 2 | Presidents Cup |
| 4 | Uzbekistan | 3 | 0 | 0 | 3 | 93 | 120 | −27 | 0 | Presidents Cup |

Source: IHF
Rules for classification: 1) points; 2) head-to-head points; 3) head-to-head goal difference; 4) head-to-head number of goals scored; 5) goal difference.
(H) Hosts

| 30 July 2022; 16:30 | Iran | 47–31 | Uzbekistan | Boris Trajkovski Sports Center, Skopje; Attendance: 50; Referees: Magalhães, Godoy (BRA) |
| 30 July 2022; 16:30 | Merikhi 11 | (21–17) | Erkabaeva 7 | Boris Trajkovski Sports Center, Skopje; Attendance: 50; Referees: Magalhães, Godoy (BRA) |
| 30 July 2022; 16:30 | 1× (yellow card) 5× (suspension) | Report | 1× (yellow card) 5× (suspension) | Boris Trajkovski Sports Center, Skopje; Attendance: 50; Referees: Magalhães, Godoy (BRA) |

| 30 July 2022; 20:30 | North Macedonia | 32–13 | Senegal | Boris Trajkovski Sports Center, Skopje; Attendance: 200; Referees: Sá, Sá (POR) |
| 30 July 2022; 20:30 | four players 5 | (17–7) | Sarr 4 | Boris Trajkovski Sports Center, Skopje; Attendance: 200; Referees: Sá, Sá (POR) |
| 30 July 2022; 20:30 | 4× (suspension) | Report | 6× (suspension) | Boris Trajkovski Sports Center, Skopje; Attendance: 200; Referees: Sá, Sá (POR) |

| 31 July 2022; 16:10 | Senegal | 29–39 | Iran | Boris Trajkovski Sports Center, Skopje; Attendance: 50; Referees: Hizaki, Ikebuchi (JPN) |
| 31 July 2022; 16:10 | Kebe 7 | (13–19) | Merikhi 12 | Boris Trajkovski Sports Center, Skopje; Attendance: 50; Referees: Hizaki, Ikebuchi (JPN) |
| 31 July 2022; 16:10 | 7× (suspension) | Report | 3× (suspension) | Boris Trajkovski Sports Center, Skopje; Attendance: 50; Referees: Hizaki, Ikebuchi (JPN) |

| 31 July 2022; 20:30 | North Macedonia | 39–30 | Uzbekistan | Boris Trajkovski Sports Center, Skopje; Attendance: 250; Referees: Cheng, Zhou (CHN) |
| 31 July 2022; 20:30 | Koceva 9 | (20–19) | Erkabaeva, Saparbaeva 10 | Boris Trajkovski Sports Center, Skopje; Attendance: 250; Referees: Cheng, Zhou (CHN) |
| 31 July 2022; 20:30 | 2× (yellow card) 2× (suspension) | Report | 5× (suspension) | Boris Trajkovski Sports Center, Skopje; Attendance: 250; Referees: Cheng, Zhou (CHN) |

| 2 August 2022; 10:30 | Uzbekistan | 32–34 | Senegal | Jane Sandanski Arena, Skopje; Attendance: 120; Referees: Antić, Jakovljević (SRB) |
| 2 August 2022; 10:30 | Erkabaeva 11 | (15–18) | Gomis 12 | Jane Sandanski Arena, Skopje; Attendance: 120; Referees: Antić, Jakovljević (SRB) |
| 2 August 2022; 10:30 | 4× (suspension) | Report | 5× (suspension) | Jane Sandanski Arena, Skopje; Attendance: 120; Referees: Antić, Jakovljević (SRB) |

| 2 August 2022; 20:30 | Iran | 19–31 | North Macedonia | Boris Trajkovski Sports Center, Skopje; Attendance: 350; Referees: Altmár, Horváth (HUN) |
| 2 August 2022; 20:30 | Merikhi, Fotovati 5 | (8–11) | Duskoska 6 | Boris Trajkovski Sports Center, Skopje; Attendance: 350; Referees: Altmár, Horváth (HUN) |
| 2 August 2022; 20:30 | 1× (suspension) | Report | 1× (yellow card) 3× (suspension) | Boris Trajkovski Sports Center, Skopje; Attendance: 350; Referees: Altmár, Horváth (HUN) |

=== Group C ===
| Pos | Team | Pld | W | D | L | GF | GA | GD | Pts | Qualification |
|---|---|---|---|---|---|---|---|---|---|---|
| 1 | Denmark | 3 | 3 | 0 | 0 | 96 | 66 | +30 | 6 | Main round |
| 2 | Portugal | 3 | 2 | 0 | 1 | 87 | 84 | +3 | 4 | Main round |
| 3 | Faroe Islands | 3 | 1 | 0 | 2 | 75 | 82 | −7 | 2 | Presidents Cup |
| 4 | Austria | 3 | 0 | 0 | 3 | 70 | 96 | −26 | 0 | Presidents Cup |

Source: IHF
Rules for classification: 1) points; 2) head-to-head points; 3) head-to-head goal difference; 4) head-to-head number of goals scored; 5) goal difference.

| 30 July 2022; 13:30 | Portugal | 29–24 | Faroe Islands | Jane Sandanski Arena Hall B, Skopje; Attendance: 150; Referees: Cheng, Zhou (CHN) |
| 30 July 2022; 13:30 | Sequeira 8 | (15–13) | Arge 10 | Jane Sandanski Arena Hall B, Skopje; Attendance: 150; Referees: Cheng, Zhou (CHN) |
| 30 July 2022; 13:30 | 1× (yellow card) 5× (suspension) | Report | 2× (suspension) | Jane Sandanski Arena Hall B, Skopje; Attendance: 150; Referees: Cheng, Zhou (CHN) |

| 30 July 2022; 16:30 | Denmark | 32–21 | Austria | Jane Sandanski Arena, Skopje; Attendance: 100; Referees: Bozhinovski, Nachevski (MKD) |
| 30 July 2022; 16:30 | Scaglione 7 | (18–9) | Prokop 4 | Jane Sandanski Arena, Skopje; Attendance: 100; Referees: Bozhinovski, Nachevski (MKD) |
| 30 July 2022; 16:30 | 6× (suspension) | Report | 2× (suspension) | Jane Sandanski Arena, Skopje; Attendance: 100; Referees: Bozhinovski, Nachevski (MKD) |

| 31 July 2022; 18:20 | Faroe Islands | 20–31 | Denmark | Boris Trajkovski Sports Center, Skopje; Attendance: 80; Referees: Antić, Jakovljević (SRB) |
| 31 July 2022; 18:20 | Hammer 5 | (11–18) | Johansen 11 | Boris Trajkovski Sports Center, Skopje; Attendance: 80; Referees: Antić, Jakovljević (SRB) |
| 31 July 2022; 18:20 | 1× (yellow card) 5× (suspension) | Report | 1× (yellow card) 4× (suspension) | Boris Trajkovski Sports Center, Skopje; Attendance: 80; Referees: Antić, Jakovljević (SRB) |

| 31 July 2022; 20:30 | Portugal | 33–27 | Austria | Jane Sandanski Arena, Skopje; Attendance: 100; Referees: Burgos, Delgado (ARG) |
| 31 July 2022; 20:30 | Gonçalves, Sequeira 5 | (13–11) | Prokop 8 | Jane Sandanski Arena, Skopje; Attendance: 100; Referees: Burgos, Delgado (ARG) |
| 31 July 2022; 20:30 | 3× (suspension) | Report | 4× (suspension) | Jane Sandanski Arena, Skopje; Attendance: 100; Referees: Burgos, Delgado (ARG) |

| 2 August 2022; 10:30 | Austria | 22–31 | Faroe Islands | Boris Trajkovski Sports Center, Skopje; Attendance: 80; Referees: Gheisarian, Gheisarian (IRI) |
| 2 August 2022; 10:30 | Marksteiner, Mustedanagic 4 | (12–15) | Hedinsdóttir 7 | Boris Trajkovski Sports Center, Skopje; Attendance: 80; Referees: Gheisarian, Gheisarian (IRI) |
| 2 August 2022; 10:30 | 2× (suspension) | Report | 4× (suspension) | Boris Trajkovski Sports Center, Skopje; Attendance: 80; Referees: Gheisarian, Gheisarian (IRI) |

| 2 August 2022; 12:30 | Denmark | 33–25 | Portugal | Boris Trajkovski Sports Center, Skopje; Attendance: 100; Referees: Doychinov, Goretsov (BUL) |
| 2 August 2022; 12:30 | Johansen 9 | (16–13) | Rebelo 8 | Boris Trajkovski Sports Center, Skopje; Attendance: 100; Referees: Doychinov, Goretsov (BUL) |
| 2 August 2022; 12:30 | 4× (suspension) | Report | 6× (suspension) | Boris Trajkovski Sports Center, Skopje; Attendance: 100; Referees: Doychinov, Goretsov (BUL) |

=== Group D ===
| Pos | Team | Pld | W | D | L | GF | GA | GD | Pts | Qualification |
|---|---|---|---|---|---|---|---|---|---|---|
| 1 | Egypt | 3 | 3 | 0 | 0 | 114 | 86 | +28 | 6 | Main round |
| 2 | Croatia | 3 | 2 | 0 | 1 | 116 | 95 | +21 | 4 | Main round |
| 3 | Kazakhstan | 3 | 1 | 0 | 2 | 57 | 70 | −13 | 2 | Presidents Cup |
| 4 | India | 3 | 0 | 0 | 3 | 70 | 106 | −36 | 0 | Presidents Cup |

Source: IHF
Rules for classification: 1) points; 2) head-to-head points; 3) head-to-head goal difference; 4) head-to-head number of goals scored; 5) goal difference.

| Cancelled | Kazakhstan | 10–0 (Note: The match, originally scheduled for 30 July 2022, was not played after the Indian team did not arrive in time. It was counted as a 10–0 win for Kazakhstan.) | India | Jane Sandanski Arena Hall B, Skopje |

| 30 July 2022; 10:30 | Croatia | 31–33 | Egypt | Jane Sandanski Arena, Skopje; Attendance: 47; Referees: Ismoilov, Ismoilov (UZB) |
| 30 July 2022; 10:30 | Žagar 10 | (11–15) | Omar 11 | Jane Sandanski Arena, Skopje; Attendance: 47; Referees: Ismoilov, Ismoilov (UZB) |
| 30 July 2022; 10:30 | 1× (yellow card) 5× (suspension) | Report | 3× (suspension) | Jane Sandanski Arena, Skopje; Attendance: 47; Referees: Ismoilov, Ismoilov (UZB) |

| 31 July 2022; 14:00 | India | 36–54 | Croatia | Jane Sandanski Arena, Skopje; Attendance: 60; Referees: Hussein, Imran (IRQ) |
| 31 July 2022; 14:00 | Jassi 12 | (21–28) | Lujić 10 | Jane Sandanski Arena, Skopje; Attendance: 60; Referees: Hussein, Imran (IRQ) |
| 31 July 2022; 14:00 | 2× (suspension) | Report | 3× (suspension) | Jane Sandanski Arena, Skopje; Attendance: 60; Referees: Hussein, Imran (IRQ) |

| 31 July 2022; 16:10 | Kazakhstan | 21–39 | Egypt | Jane Sandanski Arena, Skopje; Attendance: 50; Referees: Doychinov, Goretsov (BUL) |
| 31 July 2022; 16:10 | Berenda 12 | (12–23) | Osama 7 | Jane Sandanski Arena, Skopje; Attendance: 50; Referees: Doychinov, Goretsov (BUL) |
| 31 July 2022; 16:10 | 1× (yellow card) 2× (suspension) | Report | 1× (yellow card) 4× (suspension) | Jane Sandanski Arena, Skopje; Attendance: 50; Referees: Doychinov, Goretsov (BUL) |

| 2 August 2022; 10:00 | Egypt | 42–34 | India | Jane Sandanski Arena Hall B, Skopje; Attendance: 25; Referees: Duplii, Pobedrina (UKR) |
| 2 August 2022; 10:00 | Elsheref 8 | (21–18) | Priya 8 | Jane Sandanski Arena Hall B, Skopje; Attendance: 25; Referees: Duplii, Pobedrina (UKR) |
| 2 August 2022; 10:00 | 3× (suspension) | Report | 1× (suspension) | Jane Sandanski Arena Hall B, Skopje; Attendance: 25; Referees: Duplii, Pobedrina (UKR) |

| 2 August 2022; 13:30 | Croatia | 31–26 | Kazakhstan | Jane Sandanski Arena Hall B, Skopje; Attendance: 40; Referees: Chouraki, El Mouniri (ALG) |
| 2 August 2022; 13:30 | Žagar 8 | (15–12) | Kuandykova 10 | Jane Sandanski Arena Hall B, Skopje; Attendance: 40; Referees: Chouraki, El Mouniri (ALG) |
| 2 August 2022; 13:30 | 3× (suspension) | Report | 3× (suspension) | Jane Sandanski Arena Hall B, Skopje; Attendance: 40; Referees: Chouraki, El Mouniri (ALG) |

=== Group E ===
| Pos | Team | Pld | W | D | L | GF | GA | GD | Pts | Qualification |
|---|---|---|---|---|---|---|---|---|---|---|
| 1 | Netherlands | 3 | 2 | 1 | 0 | 93 | 66 | +27 | 5 (Note: Romania 29–29 Netherlands) | Main round |
| 2 | Romania | 3 | 2 | 1 | 0 | 103 | 81 | +22 | 5 | Main round |
| 3 | Slovenia | 3 | 1 | 0 | 2 | 75 | 98 | −23 | 2 | Presidents Cup |
| 4 | Guinea | 3 | 0 | 0 | 3 | 79 | 105 | −26 | 0 | Presidents Cup |

Source: IHF
Rules for classification: 1) points; 2) head-to-head points; 3) head-to-head goal difference; 4) head-to-head number of goals scored; 5) goal difference.
Notes:

| 30 July 2022; 18:30 | Netherlands | 31–17 | Slovenia | Jane Sandanski Arena, Skopje; Attendance: 60; Referees: Wenninger, Vranes (AUT) |
| 30 July 2022; 18:30 | three players 5 | (18–10) | Ocepek, Zulić 3 | Jane Sandanski Arena, Skopje; Attendance: 60; Referees: Wenninger, Vranes (AUT) |
| 30 July 2022; 18:30 | 3× (suspension) | Report | 4× (suspension) | Jane Sandanski Arena, Skopje; Attendance: 60; Referees: Wenninger, Vranes (AUT) |

| 30 July 2022; 20:30 | Romania | 39–27 | Guinea | Jane Sandanski Arena Hall B, Skopje; Attendance: 50; Referees: Araújo, Perdomo (URU) |
| 30 July 2022; 20:30 | Lixandroiu 8 | (19–13) | Kourouma, Soumah 5 | Jane Sandanski Arena Hall B, Skopje; Attendance: 50; Referees: Araújo, Perdomo (URU) |
| 30 July 2022; 20:30 | 2× (suspension) | Report | 5× (suspension) | Jane Sandanski Arena Hall B, Skopje; Attendance: 50; Referees: Araújo, Perdomo (URU) |

| 1 August 2022; 14:00 | Netherlands | 33–20 | Guinea | Jane Sandanski Arena, Skopje; Attendance: 100; Referees: Magalhães, Godoy (BRA) |
| 1 August 2022; 14:00 | Van Maurik 6 | (19–13) | Soumah 7 | Jane Sandanski Arena, Skopje; Attendance: 100; Referees: Magalhães, Godoy (BRA) |
| 1 August 2022; 14:00 | 3× (suspension) | Report | 7× (suspension) | Jane Sandanski Arena, Skopje; Attendance: 100; Referees: Magalhães, Godoy (BRA) |

| 1 August 2022; 20:30 | Slovenia | 25–35 | Romania | Jane Sandanski Arena, Skopje; Attendance: 100; Referees: Altmár, Horváth (HUN) |
| 1 August 2022; 20:30 | Zulić 8 | (12–15) | Lixandroiu 9 | Jane Sandanski Arena, Skopje; Attendance: 100; Referees: Altmár, Horváth (HUN) |
| 1 August 2022; 20:30 | 8× (suspension) | Report | 1× (yellow card) 3× (suspension) | Jane Sandanski Arena, Skopje; Attendance: 100; Referees: Altmár, Horváth (HUN) |

| 2 August 2022; 16:30 | Romania | 29–29 | Netherlands | Jane Sandanski Arena, Skopje; Attendance: 250; Referees: Lončar, Lončar (CRO) |
| 2 August 2022; 16:30 | Mihai 8 | (16–14) | Van Vliet 7 | Jane Sandanski Arena, Skopje; Attendance: 250; Referees: Lončar, Lončar (CRO) |
| 2 August 2022; 16:30 | 1× (yellow card) 4× (suspension) | Report | 2× (yellow card) 10× (suspension) | Jane Sandanski Arena, Skopje; Attendance: 250; Referees: Lončar, Lončar (CRO) |

| 2 August 2022; 17:00 | Guinea | 32–33 | Slovenia | Jane Sandanski Arena Hall B, Skopje; Attendance: 75; Referees: Hizaki, Ikebuchi (JPN) |
| 2 August 2022; 17:00 | Kourouma 17 | (15–21) | Zulić, Ocepek 6 | Jane Sandanski Arena Hall B, Skopje; Attendance: 75; Referees: Hizaki, Ikebuchi (JPN) |
| 2 August 2022; 17:00 | 5× (suspension) | Report | 1× (yellow card) 6× (suspension) | Jane Sandanski Arena Hall B, Skopje; Attendance: 75; Referees: Hizaki, Ikebuchi (JPN) |

=== Group F ===
| Pos | Team | Pld | W | D | L | GF | GA | GD | Pts | Qualification |
|---|---|---|---|---|---|---|---|---|---|---|
| 1 | South Korea | 3 | 3 | 0 | 0 | 100 | 86 | +14 | 6 | Main round |
| 2 | Germany | 3 | 2 | 0 | 1 | 97 | 75 | +22 | 4 | Main round |
| 3 | Switzerland | 3 | 1 | 0 | 2 | 80 | 86 | −6 | 2 | Presidents Cup |
| 4 | Slovakia | 3 | 0 | 0 | 3 | 72 | 102 | −30 | 0 | Presidents Cup |

Source: IHF
Rules for classification: 1) points; 2) head-to-head points; 3) head-to-head goal difference; 4) head-to-head number of goals scored; 5) goal difference.

| 30 July 2022; 17:00 | Switzerland | 28–32 | South Korea | Jane Sandanski Arena Hall B, Skopje; Attendance: 80; Referees: Burgos, Delgado (ARG) |
| 30 July 2022; 17:00 | three players 5 | (13–15) | Kim M. 12 | Jane Sandanski Arena Hall B, Skopje; Attendance: 80; Referees: Burgos, Delgado (ARG) |
| 30 July 2022; 17:00 | 4× (suspension) | Report | 6× (suspension) | Jane Sandanski Arena Hall B, Skopje; Attendance: 80; Referees: Burgos, Delgado (ARG) |

| 30 July 2022; 20:30 | Germany | 39–18 | Slovakia | Jane Sandanski Arena, Skopje; Attendance: 57; Referees: Belkhiri, Hamidi (ALG) |
| 30 July 2022; 20:30 | Ehlert 7 | (16–11) | Šalatová 5 | Jane Sandanski Arena, Skopje; Attendance: 57; Referees: Belkhiri, Hamidi (ALG) |
| 30 July 2022; 20:30 | 3× (suspension) | Report | 1× (yellow card) 3× (suspension) | Jane Sandanski Arena, Skopje; Attendance: 57; Referees: Belkhiri, Hamidi (ALG) |

| 1 August 2022; 16:10 | South Korea | 34–28 | Germany | Jane Sandanski Arena, Skopje; Attendance: 100; Referees: Bozhinovski, Nachevski (MKD) |
| 1 August 2022; 16:10 | Kim Seo. 9 | (19–12) | Kühne, Leuchter 6 | Jane Sandanski Arena, Skopje; Attendance: 100; Referees: Bozhinovski, Nachevski (MKD) |
| 1 August 2022; 16:10 | 1× (yellow card) 5× (suspension) | Report | 1× (yellow card) 2× (suspension) | Jane Sandanski Arena, Skopje; Attendance: 100; Referees: Bozhinovski, Nachevski (MKD) |

| 1 August 2022; 18:20 | Switzerland | 29–24 | Slovakia | Jane Sandanski Arena, Skopje; Attendance: 100; Referees: Gheisarian, Gheisarian (IRI) |
| 1 August 2022; 18:20 | Bächtiger, Coker 5 | (14–12) | Kucsera 7 | Jane Sandanski Arena, Skopje; Attendance: 100; Referees: Gheisarian, Gheisarian (IRI) |
| 1 August 2022; 18:20 | 8× (suspension) | Report | 6× (suspension) | Jane Sandanski Arena, Skopje; Attendance: 100; Referees: Gheisarian, Gheisarian (IRI) |

| 2 August 2022; 14:30 | Slovakia | 30–34 | South Korea | Jane Sandanski Arena, Skopje; Attendance: 100; Referees: Ismoilov, Ismoilov (UZB) |
| 2 August 2022; 14:30 | Šalatová 8 | (15–17) | Kim J. 9 | Jane Sandanski Arena, Skopje; Attendance: 100; Referees: Ismoilov, Ismoilov (UZB) |
| 2 August 2022; 14:30 | 1× (suspension) | Report | 2× (suspension) | Jane Sandanski Arena, Skopje; Attendance: 100; Referees: Ismoilov, Ismoilov (UZB) |

| 2 August 2022; 20:30 | Germany | 30–23 | Switzerland | Jane Sandanski Arena Hall B, Skopje; Attendance: 76; Referees: Araújo, Perdomo (URU) |
| 2 August 2022; 20:30 | Kühne, Ehlert 6 | (16–10) | Emmenegger, Bucher 5 | Jane Sandanski Arena Hall B, Skopje; Attendance: 76; Referees: Araújo, Perdomo (URU) |
| 2 August 2022; 20:30 | 2× (suspension) | Report | 2× (suspension) | Jane Sandanski Arena Hall B, Skopje; Attendance: 76; Referees: Araújo, Perdomo (URU) |

=== Group G ===
| Pos | Team | Pld | W | D | L | GF | GA | GD | Pts | Qualification |
|---|---|---|---|---|---|---|---|---|---|---|
| 1 | Norway | 3 | 3 | 0 | 0 | 84 | 56 | +28 | 6 | Main round |
| 2 | Brazil | 3 | 1 | 1 | 1 | 78 | 77 | +1 | 3 (Note: Czech Republic 28–28 Brazil) | Main round |
| 3 | Czech Republic | 3 | 1 | 1 | 1 | 71 | 74 | −3 | 3 | Presidents Cup |
| 4 | Uruguay | 3 | 0 | 0 | 3 | 59 | 85 | −26 | 0 | Presidents Cup |

Source: IHF
Rules for classification: 1) points; 2) head-to-head points; 3) head-to-head goal difference; 4) head-to-head number of goals scored; 5) goal difference.
Notes:

| 30 July 2022; 14:30 | Czech Republic | 24–23 | Uruguay | Jane Sandanski Arena, Skopje; Attendance: 75; Referees: Gheisarian, Gheisarian (IRI) |
| 30 July 2022; 14:30 | Schreibmeierová 8 | (14–12) | Barthaburu 6 | Jane Sandanski Arena, Skopje; Attendance: 75; Referees: Gheisarian, Gheisarian (IRI) |
| 30 July 2022; 14:30 | 1× (yellow card) 5× (suspension) 1× (red card) | Report | 5× (suspension) | Jane Sandanski Arena, Skopje; Attendance: 75; Referees: Gheisarian, Gheisarian (IRI) |

| 30 July 2022; 14:30 | Norway | 31–19 | Brazil | Boris Trajkovski Sports Center, Skopje; Attendance: 70; Referees: Hussein, Imran (IRQ) |
| 30 July 2022; 14:30 | Bore, Jullumstrø 5 | (14–8) | Rosa 6 | Boris Trajkovski Sports Center, Skopje; Attendance: 70; Referees: Hussein, Imran (IRQ) |
| 30 July 2022; 14:30 | 1× (suspension) | Report | 5× (suspension) | Boris Trajkovski Sports Center, Skopje; Attendance: 70; Referees: Hussein, Imran (IRQ) |

| 1 August 2022; 14:00 | Uruguay | 18–30 | Norway | Boris Trajkovski Sports Center, Skopje; Attendance: 40; Referees: Chouraki, El Mouniri (ALG) |
| 1 August 2022; 14:00 | Barthaburu 6 | (10–13) | Hedenstad, Kyrkjeeide 4 | Boris Trajkovski Sports Center, Skopje; Attendance: 40; Referees: Chouraki, El Mouniri (ALG) |
| 1 August 2022; 14:00 | | Report | 1× (yellow card) 3× (suspension) | Boris Trajkovski Sports Center, Skopje; Attendance: 40; Referees: Chouraki, El Mouniri (ALG) |

| 1 August 2022; 16:10 | Czech Republic | 28–28 | Brazil | Boris Trajkovski Sports Center, Skopje; Attendance: 50; Referees: Ismoilov, Ismoilov (UZB) |
| 1 August 2022; 16:10 | Schreibmeierová 10 | (16–18) | Rosa 9 | Boris Trajkovski Sports Center, Skopje; Attendance: 50; Referees: Ismoilov, Ismoilov (UZB) |
| 1 August 2022; 16:10 | 2× (suspension) | Report | 1× (suspension) | Boris Trajkovski Sports Center, Skopje; Attendance: 50; Referees: Ismoilov, Ismoilov (UZB) |

| 2 August 2022; 16:30 | Brazil | 31–18 | Uruguay | Boris Trajkovski Sports Center, Skopje; Attendance: 70; Referees: Wenninger, Vranes (AUT) |
| 2 August 2022; 16:30 | Rodrigues 6 | (13–12) | Heilmann 4 | Boris Trajkovski Sports Center, Skopje; Attendance: 70; Referees: Wenninger, Vranes (AUT) |
| 2 August 2022; 16:30 | 3× (suspension) | Report | 1× (yellow card) 3× (suspension) 1× (red card) | Boris Trajkovski Sports Center, Skopje; Attendance: 70; Referees: Wenninger, Vranes (AUT) |

| 2 August 2022; 18:30 | Norway | 23–19 | Czech Republic | Jane Sandanski Arena, Skopje; Attendance: 111; Referees: Cheng, Zhou (CHN) |
| 2 August 2022; 18:30 | Hedenstad 6 | (13–10) | Jestříbková 5 | Jane Sandanski Arena, Skopje; Attendance: 111; Referees: Cheng, Zhou (CHN) |
| 2 August 2022; 18:30 | 4× (suspension) | Report | 1× (yellow card) 1× (suspension) | Jane Sandanski Arena, Skopje; Attendance: 111; Referees: Cheng, Zhou (CHN) |

=== Group H ===
| Pos | Team | Pld | W | D | L | GF | GA | GD | Pts | Qualification |
|---|---|---|---|---|---|---|---|---|---|---|
| 1 | Hungary | 3 | 3 | 0 | 0 | 89 | 70 | +19 | 6 | Main round |
| 2 | France | 3 | 2 | 0 | 1 | 75 | 70 | +5 | 4 | Main round |
| 3 | Spain | 3 | 1 | 0 | 2 | 93 | 85 | +8 | 2 | Presidents Cup |
| 4 | Argentina | 3 | 0 | 0 | 3 | 69 | 101 | −32 | 0 | Presidents Cup |

Source: IHF
Rules for classification: 1) points; 2) head-to-head points; 3) head-to-head goal difference; 4) head-to-head number of goals scored; 5) goal difference.

| 30 July 2022; 12:30 | France | 31–28 | Spain | Boris Trajkovski Sports Center, Skopje; Attendance: 100; Referees: Lončar, Lončar (CRO) |
| 30 July 2022; 12:30 | L. Borg 10 | (16–14) | Arroyo, Manterola 6 | Boris Trajkovski Sports Center, Skopje; Attendance: 100; Referees: Lončar, Lončar (CRO) |
| 30 July 2022; 12:30 | 2× (yellow card) 5× (suspension) | Report | 6× (suspension) | Boris Trajkovski Sports Center, Skopje; Attendance: 100; Referees: Lončar, Lončar (CRO) |

| 30 July 2022; 18:30 | Hungary | 39–23 | Argentina | Boris Trajkovski Sports Center, Skopje; Referees: Chouraki, El Mouniri (ALG) |
| 30 July 2022; 18:30 | Farkas 7 | (16–11) | Gull 5 | Boris Trajkovski Sports Center, Skopje; Referees: Chouraki, El Mouniri (ALG) |
| 30 July 2022; 18:30 | 1× (suspension) | Report | 2× (suspension) | Boris Trajkovski Sports Center, Skopje; Referees: Chouraki, El Mouniri (ALG) |

| 1 August 2022; 18:20 | France | 23–20 | Argentina | Boris Trajkovski Sports Center, Skopje; Attendance: 100; Referees: Duplii, Pobedrina (UKR) |
| 1 August 2022; 18:20 | Perret 9 | (11–7) | Layus 6 | Boris Trajkovski Sports Center, Skopje; Attendance: 100; Referees: Duplii, Pobedrina (UKR) |
| 1 August 2022; 18:20 | 6× (suspension) | Report | 4× (suspension) | Boris Trajkovski Sports Center, Skopje; Attendance: 100; Referees: Duplii, Pobedrina (UKR) |

| 1 August 2022; 20:30 | Spain | 26–28 | Hungary | Boris Trajkovski Sports Center, Skopje; Attendance: 100; Referees: Wenninger, Vranes (AUT) |
| 1 August 2022; 20:30 | Somaza 8 | (17–13) | Simon 11 | Boris Trajkovski Sports Center, Skopje; Attendance: 100; Referees: Wenninger, Vranes (AUT) |
| 1 August 2022; 20:30 | 1× (yellow card) 1× (suspension) | Report | 6× (suspension) | Boris Trajkovski Sports Center, Skopje; Attendance: 100; Referees: Wenninger, Vranes (AUT) |

| 2 August 2022; 14:30 | Argentina | 26–39 | Spain | Boris Trajkovski Sports Center, Skopje; Attendance: 100; Referees: Reyes, Zuñiga (CUB) |
| 2 August 2022; 14:30 | six players 3 | (11–21) | Tort Net 6 | Boris Trajkovski Sports Center, Skopje; Attendance: 100; Referees: Reyes, Zuñiga (CUB) |
| 2 August 2022; 14:30 | 1× (yellow card) 2× (suspension) | Report | 1× (yellow card) 4× (suspension) | Boris Trajkovski Sports Center, Skopje; Attendance: 100; Referees: Reyes, Zuñiga (CUB) |

| 2 August 2022; 18:30 | Hungary | 22–21 | France | Boris Trajkovski Sports Center, Skopje; Attendance: 100; Referees: Belkhiri, Hamidi (ALG) |
| 2 August 2022; 18:30 | Kármán 6 | (7–7) | Dury, Perret 5 | Boris Trajkovski Sports Center, Skopje; Attendance: 100; Referees: Belkhiri, Hamidi (ALG) |
| 2 August 2022; 18:30 | 1× (yellow card) 2× (suspension) | Report | 1× (yellow card) 1× (suspension) | Boris Trajkovski Sports Center, Skopje; Attendance: 100; Referees: Belkhiri, Hamidi (ALG) |

== President's Cup ==
Points obtained in the matches against the team from the group were taken over.

=== Group I ===
| Pos | Team | Pld | W | D | L | GF | GA | GD | Pts | Qualification |
|---|---|---|---|---|---|---|---|---|---|---|
| 1 | Montenegro | 3 | 3 | 0 | 0 | 119 | 62 | +57 | 6 | 17–20th place semifinals |
| 2 | Uzbekistan | 3 | 1 | 0 | 2 | 110 | 116 | −6 | 2 | 21st–24th place semifinals |
| 3 | Senegal | 3 | 1 | 0 | 2 | 85 | 107 | −22 | 2 | 25–28th place semifinals |
| 4 | Algeria | 3 | 1 | 0 | 2 | 92 | 121 | −29 | 2 | 29th–32nd place semifinals |

Source: IHF
Rules for classification: 1) points; 2) head-to-head points; 3) head-to-head goal difference; 4) head-to-head number of goals scored; 5) goal difference.

| 3 August 2022; 14:30 | Senegal | 31–37 | Algeria | Boris Trajkovski Sports Center, Skopje; Attendance: 40; Referees: Reyes, Araújo |
| 3 August 2022; 14:30 | Kebe 8 | (12–13) | Sahraoui 7 | Boris Trajkovski Sports Center, Skopje; Attendance: 40; Referees: Reyes, Araújo |
| 3 August 2022; 14:30 | 3× (suspension) | Report | 1× (yellow card) 4× (suspension) | Boris Trajkovski Sports Center, Skopje; Attendance: 40; Referees: Reyes, Araújo |

| 3 August 2022; 16:30 | Montenegro | 43–26 | Uzbekistan | Boris Trajkovski Sports Center, Skopje; Attendance: 72; Referees: Zuñiga, Perdomo |
| 3 August 2022; 16:30 | Vukčević 6 | (21–12) | Erkabaeva 8 | Boris Trajkovski Sports Center, Skopje; Attendance: 72; Referees: Zuñiga, Perdomo |
| 3 August 2022; 16:30 | 2× (suspension) | Report | 5× (suspension) | Boris Trajkovski Sports Center, Skopje; Attendance: 72; Referees: Zuñiga, Perdomo |

| 5 August 2022; 10:00 | Montenegro | 38–20 | Senegal | Jane Sandanski Arena Hall B, Skopje; Attendance: 74; Referees: Imran, Hizaki |
| 5 August 2022; 10:00 | Micevski 7 | (17–8) | Kebe 7 | Jane Sandanski Arena Hall B, Skopje; Attendance: 74; Referees: Imran, Hizaki |
| 5 August 2022; 10:00 | 4× (suspension) 1× (red card) | Report | 7× (suspension) | Jane Sandanski Arena Hall B, Skopje; Attendance: 74; Referees: Imran, Hizaki |

| 5 August 2022; 13:30 | Algeria | 39–52 | Uzbekistan | Jane Sandanski Arena Hall B, Skopje; Attendance: 43; Referees: Wenninger, Jakovljević |
| 5 August 2022; 13:30 | Choudani 9 | (19–26) | Mullaeva 11 | Jane Sandanski Arena Hall B, Skopje; Attendance: 43; Referees: Wenninger, Jakovljević |
| 5 August 2022; 13:30 | 7× (suspension) | Report | 6× (suspension) | Jane Sandanski Arena Hall B, Skopje; Attendance: 43; Referees: Wenninger, Jakovljević |

=== Group II ===
| Pos | Team | Pld | W | D | L | GF | GA | GD | Pts | Qualification |
|---|---|---|---|---|---|---|---|---|---|---|
| 1 | Faroe Islands | 3 | 3 | 0 | 0 | 89 | 66 | +23 | 6 | 17–20th place semifinals |
| 2 | Austria | 3 | 1 | 1 | 1 | 84 | 86 | −2 | 3 | 21st–24th place semifinals |
| 3 | Kazakhstan | 3 | 1 | 0 | 2 | 55 | 61 | −6 | 2 | 25–28th place semifinals |
| 4 | India | 3 | 0 | 1 | 2 | 54 | 69 | −15 | 1 | 29th–32nd place semifinals |

Source: IHF
Rules for classification: 1) points; 2) head-to-head points; 3) head-to-head goal difference; 4) head-to-head number of goals scored; 5) goal difference.

| 3 August 2022; 14:30 | Faroe Islands | 27–22 | India | Jane Sandanski Arena, Skopje; Attendance: 50; Referees: Sá, Jakovljević |
| 3 August 2022; 14:30 | Halsdottir 7 | (14–9) | Jassi 10 | Jane Sandanski Arena, Skopje; Attendance: 50; Referees: Sá, Jakovljević |
| 3 August 2022; 14:30 | 1× (yellow card) 3× (suspension) | Report | 3× (suspension) | Jane Sandanski Arena, Skopje; Attendance: 50; Referees: Sá, Jakovljević |

| 3 August 2022; 16:30 | Kazakhstan | 23–30 | Austria | Jane Sandanski Arena, Skopje; Attendance: 80; Referees: Sá, Antić |
| 3 August 2022; 16:30 | Kuandykova 10 | (10–16) | Kovacs, Marksteiner 5 | Jane Sandanski Arena, Skopje; Attendance: 80; Referees: Sá, Antić |
| 3 August 2022; 16:30 | 7× (suspension) 1× (red card) | Report | 2× (yellow card) | Jane Sandanski Arena, Skopje; Attendance: 80; Referees: Sá, Antić |

| 5 August 2022; 10:30 | Faroe Islands | 31–22 | Kazakhstan | Boris Trajkovski Sports Center, Skopje; Attendance: 52; Referees: Magalhães, Zuñiga |
| 5 August 2022; 10:30 | Arge 10 | (17–12) | Berenda 6 | Boris Trajkovski Sports Center, Skopje; Attendance: 52; Referees: Magalhães, Zuñiga |
| 5 August 2022; 10:30 | 1× (yellow card) 4× (suspension) | Report | 5× (suspension) | Boris Trajkovski Sports Center, Skopje; Attendance: 52; Referees: Magalhães, Zuñiga |

| 5 August 2022; 20:30 | Austria | 32–32 | India | Jane Sandanski Arena Hall B, Skopje; Attendance: 43; Referees: Ikebuchi, Hussein |
| 5 August 2022; 20:30 | Marksteiner 7 | (15–15) | Garima 12 | Jane Sandanski Arena Hall B, Skopje; Attendance: 43; Referees: Ikebuchi, Hussein |
| 5 August 2022; 20:30 | 6× (suspension) | Report | 5× (suspension) | Jane Sandanski Arena Hall B, Skopje; Attendance: 43; Referees: Ikebuchi, Hussein |

=== Group III ===
| Pos | Team | Pld | W | D | L | GF | GA | GD | Pts | Qualification |
|---|---|---|---|---|---|---|---|---|---|---|
| 1 | Slovenia | 3 | 3 | 0 | 0 | 98 | 85 | +13 | 6 | 17–20th place semifinals |
| 2 | Switzerland | 3 | 2 | 0 | 1 | 84 | 78 | +6 | 4 | 21st–24th place semifinals |
| 3 | Slovakia | 3 | 1 | 0 | 2 | 85 | 89 | −4 | 2 | 25–28th place semifinals |
| 4 | Guinea | 3 | 0 | 0 | 3 | 81 | 96 | −15 | 0 | 29th–32nd place semifinals |

Source: IHF
Rules for classification: 1) points; 2) head-to-head points; 3) head-to-head goal difference; 4) head-to-head number of goals scored; 5) goal difference.

| 4 August 2022; 14:30 | Switzerland | 32–22 | Guinea | Jane Sandanski Arena, Skopje; Attendance: 77; Referees: Gheisarian, Ismoilov |
| 4 August 2022; 14:30 | Riner 8 | (18–11) | Bangoura 7 | Jane Sandanski Arena, Skopje; Attendance: 77; Referees: Gheisarian, Ismoilov |
| 4 August 2022; 14:30 | 4× (suspension) | Report | 2× (suspension) | Jane Sandanski Arena, Skopje; Attendance: 77; Referees: Gheisarian, Ismoilov |

| 4 August 2022; 16:30 | Slovenia | 33–30 | Slovakia | Jane Sandanski Arena, Skopje; Attendance: 150; Referees: Wenninger, Pobedrina |
| 4 August 2022; 16:30 | Bukovec, Zulić 9 | (19–17) | Walterová 8 | Jane Sandanski Arena, Skopje; Attendance: 150; Referees: Wenninger, Pobedrina |
| 4 August 2022; 16:30 | 1× (yellow card) 5× (suspension) | Report | 7× (suspension) | Jane Sandanski Arena, Skopje; Attendance: 150; Referees: Wenninger, Pobedrina |

| 5 August 2022; 12:30 | Guinea | 27–31 | Slovakia | Boris Trajkovski Sports Center, Skopje; Attendance: 40; Referees: Godoy, Reyes |
| 5 August 2022; 12:30 | Bangoura 8 | (18–18) | Walterová 11 | Boris Trajkovski Sports Center, Skopje; Attendance: 40; Referees: Godoy, Reyes |
| 5 August 2022; 12:30 | 6× (suspension) | Report | 1× (yellow card) 3× (suspension) | Boris Trajkovski Sports Center, Skopje; Attendance: 40; Referees: Godoy, Reyes |

| 5 August 2022; 17:00 | Slovenia | 32–23 | Switzerland | Jane Sandanski Arena Hall B, Skopje; Attendance: 72; Referees: Doychinov, Faye |
| 5 August 2022; 17:00 | Zulić 8 | (17–13) | Albrecht, Bächtiger 5 | Jane Sandanski Arena Hall B, Skopje; Attendance: 72; Referees: Doychinov, Faye |
| 5 August 2022; 17:00 | 1× (yellow card) 2× (suspension) | Report | 1× (yellow card) 5× (suspension) | Jane Sandanski Arena Hall B, Skopje; Attendance: 72; Referees: Doychinov, Faye |

=== Group IV ===
| Pos | Team | Pld | W | D | L | GF | GA | GD | Pts | Qualification |
|---|---|---|---|---|---|---|---|---|---|---|
| 1 | Spain | 3 | 3 | 0 | 0 | 117 | 68 | +49 | 6 | 17–20th place semifinals |
| 2 | Czech Republic | 3 | 2 | 0 | 1 | 74 | 84 | −10 | 4 | 21st–24th place semifinals |
| 3 | Argentina | 3 | 1 | 0 | 2 | 80 | 84 | −4 | 2 | 25–28th place semifinals |
| 4 | Uruguay | 3 | 0 | 0 | 3 | 60 | 95 | −35 | 0 | 29th–32nd place semifinals |

Source: IHF
Rules for classification: 1) points; 2) head-to-head points; 3) head-to-head goal difference; 4) head-to-head number of goals scored; 5) goal difference.

| 4 August 2022; 12:30 | Spain | 42–18 | Uruguay | Boris Trajkovski Sports Center, Skopje; Attendance: 60; Referees: Hussein, Faye |
| 4 August 2022; 12:30 | Aranda, Leunda 6 | (25–9) | Aguirre 4 | Boris Trajkovski Sports Center, Skopje; Attendance: 60; Referees: Hussein, Faye |
| 4 August 2022; 12:30 | 1× (yellow card) | Report | 3× (suspension) | Boris Trajkovski Sports Center, Skopje; Attendance: 60; Referees: Hussein, Faye |

| 4 August 2022; 14:30 | Czech Republic | 26–25 | Argentina | Boris Trajkovski Sports Center, Skopje; Attendance: 100; Referees: Gheisarian, Imran |
| 4 August 2022; 14:30 | Schreibmeierová 7 | (12–12) | Hoeler 8 | Boris Trajkovski Sports Center, Skopje; Attendance: 100; Referees: Gheisarian, Imran |
| 4 August 2022; 14:30 | 3× (suspension) | Report | 1× (yellow card) 5× (suspension) | Boris Trajkovski Sports Center, Skopje; Attendance: 100; Referees: Gheisarian, Imran |

| 5 August 2022; 10:30 | Czech Republic | 24–36 | Spain | Jane Sandanski Arena, Skopje; Attendance: 80; Referees: Gheisarian, Ismoilov |
| 5 August 2022; 10:30 | Kubálková, Schreibmeierová 4 | (12–19) | Bartolome, Bosche 7 | Jane Sandanski Arena, Skopje; Attendance: 80; Referees: Gheisarian, Ismoilov |
| 5 August 2022; 10:30 | 2× (suspension) | Report | 5× (suspension) | Jane Sandanski Arena, Skopje; Attendance: 80; Referees: Gheisarian, Ismoilov |

| 5 August 2022; 12:30 | Uruguay | 19–29 | Argentina | Jane Sandanski Arena, Skopje; Attendance: 120; Referees: Vranes, Antić |
| 5 August 2022; 12:30 | Campos 8 | (9–13) | Tajes 8 | Jane Sandanski Arena, Skopje; Attendance: 120; Referees: Vranes, Antić |
| 5 August 2022; 12:30 | 2× (suspension) | Report | 1× (yellow card) 5× (suspension) | Jane Sandanski Arena, Skopje; Attendance: 120; Referees: Vranes, Antić |

== Main round ==
Points obtained in the matches against the team from the group were taken over.

=== Group I ===
| Pos | Team | Pld | W | D | L | GF | GA | GD | Pts | Qualification |
|---|---|---|---|---|---|---|---|---|---|---|
| 1 | Iceland | 3 | 3 | 0 | 0 | 75 | 56 | +19 | 6 | Quarterfinals |
| 2 | Sweden | 3 | 1 | 1 | 1 | 76 | 61 | +15 | 3 | Quarterfinals |
| 3 | North Macedonia (H) | 3 | 1 | 1 | 1 | 73 | 64 | +9 | 3 | 9–12th place semifinals |
| 4 | Iran | 3 | 0 | 0 | 3 | 55 | 98 | −43 | 0 | 13–16th place semifinals |

Source: IHF
Rules for classification: 1) points; 2) head-to-head points; 3) head-to-head goal difference; 4) head-to-head number of goals scored; 5) goal difference.
(H) Hosts

| 3 August 2022; 18:30 | Iceland | 28–17 | Iran | Boris Trajkovski Sports Center, Skopje; Attendance: 100; Referees: Cheng, Zhou (CHN) |
| 3 August 2022; 18:30 | Ágústsdóttir 8 | (17–10) | Merikhi 6 | Boris Trajkovski Sports Center, Skopje; Attendance: 100; Referees: Cheng, Zhou (CHN) |
| 3 August 2022; 18:30 | 1× (suspension) | Report | 4× (suspension) | Boris Trajkovski Sports Center, Skopje; Attendance: 100; Referees: Cheng, Zhou (CHN) |

| 3 August 2022; 20:30 | North Macedonia | 20–20 | Sweden | Boris Trajkovski Sports Center, Skopje; Attendance: 500; Referees: Belkhiri, Hamidi (ALG) |
| 3 August 2022; 20:30 | Mladenovska 5 | (12–10) | Mihailovic 5 | Boris Trajkovski Sports Center, Skopje; Attendance: 500; Referees: Belkhiri, Hamidi (ALG) |
| 3 August 2022; 20:30 | 1× (yellow card) 3× (suspension) | Report | 1× (yellow card) 4× (suspension) | Boris Trajkovski Sports Center, Skopje; Attendance: 500; Referees: Belkhiri, Hamidi (ALG) |

| 5 August 2022; 18:30 | Sweden | 39–19 | Iran | Boris Trajkovski Sports Center, Skopje; Attendance: 120; Referees: Lončar, Lončar (CRO) |
| 5 August 2022; 18:30 | Huselius 9 | (15–8) | Bahmaei 5 | Boris Trajkovski Sports Center, Skopje; Attendance: 120; Referees: Lončar, Lončar (CRO) |
| 5 August 2022; 18:30 | 3× (suspension) | Report | 1× (yellow card) 4× (suspension) | Boris Trajkovski Sports Center, Skopje; Attendance: 120; Referees: Lončar, Lončar (CRO) |

| 5 August 2022; 20:30 | Iceland | 25–22 | North Macedonia | Boris Trajkovski Sports Center, Skopje; Attendance: 800; Referees: Burgos, Delgado (ARG) |
| 5 August 2022; 20:30 | Thorkelsdóttir, Jóhannsdóttir 6 | (13–10) | Koceva 6 | Boris Trajkovski Sports Center, Skopje; Attendance: 800; Referees: Burgos, Delgado (ARG) |
| 5 August 2022; 20:30 | 1× (yellow card) 2× (suspension) | Report | 1× (yellow card) 2× (suspension) | Boris Trajkovski Sports Center, Skopje; Attendance: 800; Referees: Burgos, Delgado (ARG) |

=== Group II ===
| Pos | Team | Pld | W | D | L | GF | GA | GD | Pts | Qualification |
|---|---|---|---|---|---|---|---|---|---|---|
| 1 | Denmark | 3 | 3 | 0 | 0 | 94 | 75 | +19 | 6 | Quarterfinals |
| 2 | Egypt | 3 | 2 | 0 | 1 | 84 | 85 | −1 | 4 | Quarterfinals |
| 3 | Croatia | 3 | 0 | 1 | 2 | 82 | 90 | −8 | 1 (Note: Portugal 28–28 Croatia) | 9–12th place semifinals |
| 4 | Portugal | 3 | 0 | 1 | 2 | 75 | 85 | −10 | 1 | 13–16th place semifinals |

Source: IHF
Rules for classification: 1) points; 2) head-to-head points; 3) head-to-head goal difference; 4) head-to-head number of goals scored; 5) goal difference.
Notes:

| 3 August 2022; 18:30 | Denmark | 29–23 | Croatia | Jane Sandanski Arena, Skopje; Attendance: 200; Referees: Magalhães, Godoy (BRA) |
| 3 August 2022; 18:30 | Scaglione, Vestergaard 7 | (13–12) | Bule 9 | Jane Sandanski Arena, Skopje; Attendance: 200; Referees: Magalhães, Godoy (BRA) |
| 3 August 2022; 18:30 | 1× (suspension) | Report | 7× (suspension) | Jane Sandanski Arena, Skopje; Attendance: 200; Referees: Magalhães, Godoy (BRA) |

| 3 August 2022; 20:30 | Egypt | 24–22 | Portugal | Jane Sandanski Arena, Skopje; Attendance: 150; Referees: Altmár, Horváth (HUN) |
| 3 August 2022; 20:30 | Abdalla, Ibrahim 7 | (11–11) | Rebelo 7 | Jane Sandanski Arena, Skopje; Attendance: 150; Referees: Altmár, Horváth (HUN) |
| 3 August 2022; 20:30 | 1× (yellow card) 5× (suspension) | Report | 1× (yellow card) 2× (suspension) | Jane Sandanski Arena, Skopje; Attendance: 150; Referees: Altmár, Horváth (HUN) |

| 5 August 2022; 14:30 | Denmark | 32–27 | Egypt | Jane Sandanski Arena, Skopje; Attendance: 75; Referees: Bozhinovski, Nachevski (MKD) |
| 5 August 2022; 14:30 | Scaglione 12 | (15–15) | Ahmed 8 | Jane Sandanski Arena, Skopje; Attendance: 75; Referees: Bozhinovski, Nachevski (MKD) |
| 5 August 2022; 14:30 | 3× (suspension) | Report | 1× (yellow card) 1× (suspension) | Jane Sandanski Arena, Skopje; Attendance: 75; Referees: Bozhinovski, Nachevski (MKD) |

| 5 August 2022; 16:30 | Portugal | 28–28 | Croatia | Jane Sandanski Arena, Skopje; Attendance: 108; Referees: Chouraki, El Mouniri (ALG) |
| 5 August 2022; 16:30 | Sequiera 10 | (15–12) | Žagar 8 | Jane Sandanski Arena, Skopje; Attendance: 108; Referees: Chouraki, El Mouniri (ALG) |
| 5 August 2022; 16:30 | 4× (suspension) | Report | 1× (yellow card) 7× (suspension) | Jane Sandanski Arena, Skopje; Attendance: 108; Referees: Chouraki, El Mouniri (ALG) |

=== Group III ===
| Pos | Team | Pld | W | D | L | GF | GA | GD | Pts | Qualification |
|---|---|---|---|---|---|---|---|---|---|---|
| 1 | South Korea | 3 | 3 | 0 | 0 | 93 | 83 | +10 | 6 | Quarterfinals |
| 2 | Netherlands | 3 | 1 | 1 | 1 | 84 | 80 | +4 | 3 | Quarterfinals |
| 3 | Germany | 3 | 1 | 0 | 2 | 81 | 92 | −11 | 2 | 9–12th place semifinals |
| 4 | Romania | 3 | 0 | 1 | 2 | 87 | 90 | −3 | 1 | 13–16th place semifinals |

Source: IHF
Rules for classification: 1) points; 2) head-to-head points; 3) head-to-head goal difference; 4) head-to-head number of goals scored; 5) goal difference.

| 4 August 2022; 16:30 | Netherlands | 31–25 | Germany | Boris Trajkovski Sports Center, Skopje; Attendance: 220; Referees: Burgos, Delgado (ARG) |
| 4 August 2022; 16:30 | Loy 7 | (14–13) | Ehlert 5 | Boris Trajkovski Sports Center, Skopje; Attendance: 220; Referees: Burgos, Delgado (ARG) |
| 4 August 2022; 16:30 | 2× (suspension) | Report | 2× (suspension) | Boris Trajkovski Sports Center, Skopje; Attendance: 220; Referees: Burgos, Delgado (ARG) |

| 4 August 2022; 18:30 | South Korea | 33–31 | Romania | Boris Trajkovski Sports Center, Skopje; Attendance: 120; Referees: Chouraki, El Mouniri (ALG) |
| 4 August 2022; 18:30 | Kim M. 10 | (17–16) | Grigore, Mezei 6 | Boris Trajkovski Sports Center, Skopje; Attendance: 120; Referees: Chouraki, El Mouniri (ALG) |
| 4 August 2022; 18:30 | 3× (suspension) | Report | 2× (yellow card) 1× (suspension) | Boris Trajkovski Sports Center, Skopje; Attendance: 120; Referees: Chouraki, El Mouniri (ALG) |

| 5 August 2022; 14:30 | Netherlands | 24–26 | South Korea | Boris Trajkovski Sports Center, Skopje; Attendance: 110; Referees: Altmár, Horváth (HUN) |
| 5 August 2022; 14:30 | Loy 7 | (7–12) | Kim J. 7 | Boris Trajkovski Sports Center, Skopje; Attendance: 110; Referees: Altmár, Horváth (HUN) |
| 5 August 2022; 14:30 | 2× (yellow card) 2× (suspension) | Report | 2× (suspension) | Boris Trajkovski Sports Center, Skopje; Attendance: 110; Referees: Altmár, Horváth (HUN) |

| 5 August 2022; 16:30 | Romania | 27–28 | Germany | Boris Trajkovski Sports Center, Skopje; Attendance: 140; Referees: Sá, Sá (POR) |
| 5 August 2022; 16:30 | Lixandroiu 7 | (12–12) | Kühne 10 | Boris Trajkovski Sports Center, Skopje; Attendance: 140; Referees: Sá, Sá (POR) |
| 5 August 2022; 16:30 | 1× (yellow card) 3× (suspension) | Report | 2× (yellow card) 6× (suspension) | Boris Trajkovski Sports Center, Skopje; Attendance: 140; Referees: Sá, Sá (POR) |

=== Group IV ===
| Pos | Team | Pld | W | D | L | GF | GA | GD | Pts | Qualification |
|---|---|---|---|---|---|---|---|---|---|---|
| 1 | Hungary | 3 | 3 | 0 | 0 | 78 | 56 | +22 | 6 | Quarterfinals |
| 2 | France | 3 | 2 | 0 | 1 | 73 | 58 | +15 | 4 | Quarterfinals |
| 3 | Norway | 3 | 1 | 0 | 2 | 69 | 65 | +4 | 2 | 9–12th place semifinals |
| 4 | Brazil | 3 | 0 | 0 | 3 | 52 | 93 | −41 | 0 | 13–16th place semifinals |

Source: IHF
Rules for classification: 1) points; 2) head-to-head points; 3) head-to-head goal difference; 4) head-to-head number of goals scored; 5) goal difference.

| 4 August 2022; 18:30 | Norway | 19–22 | France | Jane Sandanski Arena, Skopje; Attendance: 100; Referees: Bozhinovski, Nachevski (MKD) |
| 4 August 2022; 18:30 | Enger 4 | (6–11) | Perret 8 | Jane Sandanski Arena, Skopje; Attendance: 100; Referees: Bozhinovski, Nachevski (MKD) |
| 4 August 2022; 18:30 | 2× (suspension) | Report | 2× (yellow card) 5× (suspension) | Jane Sandanski Arena, Skopje; Attendance: 100; Referees: Bozhinovski, Nachevski (MKD) |

| 4 August 2022; 20:30 | Hungary | 32–16 | Brazil | Jane Sandanski Arena, Skopje; Attendance: 50; Referees: Doychinov, Goretsov (BUL) |
| 4 August 2022; 20:30 | Kovalcsik 5 | (19–10) | three players 3 | Jane Sandanski Arena, Skopje; Attendance: 50; Referees: Doychinov, Goretsov (BUL) |
| 4 August 2022; 20:30 | 1× (suspension) | Report | 2× (suspension) | Jane Sandanski Arena, Skopje; Attendance: 50; Referees: Doychinov, Goretsov (BUL) |

| 5 August 2022; 18:30 | Norway | 19–24 | Hungary | Jane Sandanski Arena, Skopje; Attendance: 150; Referees: Belkhiri, Hamidi (ALG) |
| 5 August 2022; 18:30 | Grasdal, Rosenberg 4 | (9–9) | Simon 6 | Jane Sandanski Arena, Skopje; Attendance: 150; Referees: Belkhiri, Hamidi (ALG) |
| 5 August 2022; 18:30 | 1× (yellow card) 5× (suspension) | Report | 4× (suspension) | Jane Sandanski Arena, Skopje; Attendance: 150; Referees: Belkhiri, Hamidi (ALG) |

| 5 August 2022; 20:30 | Brazil | 17–30 | France | Jane Sandanski Arena, Skopje; Attendance: 50; Referees: Duplii, Pobedrina (UKR) |
| 5 August 2022; 20:30 | Rosa 6 | (12–14) | E. Borg, Dury 6 | Jane Sandanski Arena, Skopje; Attendance: 50; Referees: Duplii, Pobedrina (UKR) |
| 5 August 2022; 20:30 | 2× (suspension) | Report | 2× (suspension) | Jane Sandanski Arena, Skopje; Attendance: 50; Referees: Duplii, Pobedrina (UKR) |

== Placement matches ==
=== 29th place bracket ===
29–32nd place semifinals
7 August
Algeria | 17
Guinea | 41
7 August
India | 27
Uruguay | 25

29th place game
8 August
Guinea | 38
India | 28
31st place game
8 August
Algeria | 26
Uruguay | 29

==== 29th–32nd place semifinals ====
| 7 August 2022; 12:00 | Algeria | 17–41 | Guinea | Boris Trajkovski Sports Center, Skopje; Attendance: 50; Referees: Hizaki, Ikebuchi (JPN) |
| 7 August 2022; 12:00 | Chebli 3 | (6–21) | Yansane 8 | Boris Trajkovski Sports Center, Skopje; Attendance: 50; Referees: Hizaki, Ikebuchi (JPN) |
| 7 August 2022; 12:00 | 3× (suspension) | Report | 2× (yellow card) 5× (suspension) | Boris Trajkovski Sports Center, Skopje; Attendance: 50; Referees: Hizaki, Ikebuchi (JPN) |

| 7 August 2022; 13:30 | India | 27–25 | Uruguay | Jane Sandanski Arena Hall B, Skopje; Attendance: 56; Referees: Wenninger, Vranes (AUT) |
| 7 August 2022; 13:30 | Jassi 8 | (13–13) | three players 4 | Jane Sandanski Arena Hall B, Skopje; Attendance: 56; Referees: Wenninger, Vranes (AUT) |
| 7 August 2022; 13:30 | 4× (suspension) | Report | 3× (suspension) | Jane Sandanski Arena Hall B, Skopje; Attendance: 56; Referees: Wenninger, Vranes (AUT) |

==== 31st place game ====
| 8 August 2022; 10:00 | Algeria | 26–29 | Uruguay | Jane Sandanski Arena Hall B, Skopje; Attendance: 61; Referees: Ismoilov, Ismoilov (UZB) |
| 8 August 2022; 10:00 | Sadi 6 | (14–15) | Márquez, Heilmann 6 | Jane Sandanski Arena Hall B, Skopje; Attendance: 61; Referees: Ismoilov, Ismoilov (UZB) |
| 8 August 2022; 10:00 | 3× (suspension) | Report | 1× (yellow card) | Jane Sandanski Arena Hall B, Skopje; Attendance: 61; Referees: Ismoilov, Ismoilov (UZB) |

==== 29th place game ====
| 8 August 2022; 13:30 | Guinea | 38–28 | India | Jane Sandanski Arena Hall B, Skopje; Attendance: 50; Referees: Hussein, Imran (IRQ) |
| 8 August 2022; 13:30 | Bangoura, Kourouma 8 | (17–16) | Kumari 9 | Jane Sandanski Arena Hall B, Skopje; Attendance: 50; Referees: Hussein, Imran (IRQ) |
| 8 August 2022; 13:30 | 3× (suspension) | Report | | Jane Sandanski Arena Hall B, Skopje; Attendance: 50; Referees: Hussein, Imran (IRQ) |

=== 25th place bracket ===
25–28th place semifinals
7 August
Senegal | 25
Slovakia | 41
7 August
Kazakhstan | 18
Argentina | 30

25th place game
8 August
Slovakia | 24
Argentina | 26
27th place game
8 August
Senegal | 24
Kazakhstan | 37

==== 25–28th place semifinals ====
| 7 August 2022; 10:00 | Kazakhstan | 18–30 | Argentina | Jane Sandanski Arena Hall B, Skopje; Attendance: 73; Referees: Sá, Sá (POR) |
| 7 August 2022; 10:00 | Kuandykova 7 | (10–16) | Hoeler, Tajes 6 | Jane Sandanski Arena Hall B, Skopje; Attendance: 73; Referees: Sá, Sá (POR) |
| 7 August 2022; 10:00 | 4× (suspension) | Report | 1× (yellow card) 2× (suspension) | Jane Sandanski Arena Hall B, Skopje; Attendance: 73; Referees: Sá, Sá (POR) |

| 7 August 2022; 12:00 | Senegal | 25–41 | Slovakia | Jane Sandanski Arena, Skopje; Attendance: 38; Referees: Hussein, Imran (IRQ) |
| 7 August 2022; 12:00 | Kebe 11 | (11–19) | Bačenková, Mydlová 8 | Jane Sandanski Arena, Skopje; Attendance: 38; Referees: Hussein, Imran (IRQ) |
| 7 August 2022; 12:00 | 3× (suspension) | Report | 2× (suspension) | Jane Sandanski Arena, Skopje; Attendance: 38; Referees: Hussein, Imran (IRQ) |

==== 27th place game ====
| 8 August 2022; 10:00 | Senegal | 24–37 | Kazakhstan | Jane Sandanski Arena, Skopje; Attendance: 45; Referees: Reyes, Zuñiga (CUB) |
| 8 August 2022; 10:00 | Fall 8 | (11–20) | Berenda 12 | Jane Sandanski Arena, Skopje; Attendance: 45; Referees: Reyes, Zuñiga (CUB) |
| 8 August 2022; 10:00 | 5× (suspension) | Report | 1× (yellow card) 2× (suspension) | Jane Sandanski Arena, Skopje; Attendance: 45; Referees: Reyes, Zuñiga (CUB) |

==== 25th place game ====
| 8 August 2022; 12:00 | Slovakia | 24–26 | Argentina | Jane Sandanski Arena, Skopje; Attendance: 95; Referees: Hizaki, Ikebuchi (JPN) |
| 8 August 2022; 12:00 | Bačenková, Walterová 5 | (12–14) | Cabana, Gull 5 | Jane Sandanski Arena, Skopje; Attendance: 95; Referees: Hizaki, Ikebuchi (JPN) |
| 8 August 2022; 12:00 | 4× (suspension) | Report | 5× (suspension) | Jane Sandanski Arena, Skopje; Attendance: 95; Referees: Hizaki, Ikebuchi (JPN) |

=== 21st place bracket ===
21st–24th place semifinals
7 August
Uzbekistan | 23
Switzerland | 43
7 August
Austria | 22
Czech Republic | 36

21st place game
8 August
Switzerland | 31
Czech Republic | 22
23rd place game
8 August
Uzbekistan | 27
Austria | 36

==== 21st–24th place semifinals ====
| 7 August 2022; 10:00 | Uzbekistan | 23–43 | Switzerland | Jane Sandanski Arena, Skopje; Attendance: 25; Referees: Reyes, Zuñiga (CUB) |
| 7 August 2022; 10:00 | Saparbaeva 6 | (8–23) | Bächtiger 7 | Jane Sandanski Arena, Skopje; Attendance: 25; Referees: Reyes, Zuñiga (CUB) |
| 7 August 2022; 10:00 | 4× (suspension) | Report | 4× (suspension) | Jane Sandanski Arena, Skopje; Attendance: 25; Referees: Reyes, Zuñiga (CUB) |

| 7 August 2022; 10:00 | Austria | 22–36 | Czech Republic | Boris Trajkovski Sports Center, Skopje; Attendance: 40; Referees: Duplii, Pobedrina (UKR) |
| 7 August 2022; 10:00 | Baljak, Mustedanagic 4 | (11–16) | Schreibmeierová 7 | Boris Trajkovski Sports Center, Skopje; Attendance: 40; Referees: Duplii, Pobedrina (UKR) |
| 7 August 2022; 10:00 | 1× (suspension) | Report | 1× (yellow card) | Boris Trajkovski Sports Center, Skopje; Attendance: 40; Referees: Duplii, Pobedrina (UKR) |

==== 23rd place game ====
| 8 August 2022; 12:00 | Uzbekistan | 27–36 | Austria | Boris Trajkovski Sports Center, Skopje; Attendance: 50; Referees: Gheisarian, Gheisarian (IRI) |
| 8 August 2022; 12:00 | Erkabaeva 6 | (12–18) | Kovacs 7 | Boris Trajkovski Sports Center, Skopje; Attendance: 50; Referees: Gheisarian, Gheisarian (IRI) |
| 8 August 2022; 12:00 | 4× (suspension) | Report | 4× (suspension) | Boris Trajkovski Sports Center, Skopje; Attendance: 50; Referees: Gheisarian, Gheisarian (IRI) |

==== 21st place game ====
| 8 August 2022; 10:00 | Switzerland | 31–23 | Czech Republic | Boris Trajkovski Sports Center, Skopje; Attendance: 30; Referees: Magalhães, Godoy (BRA) |
| 8 August 2022; 10:00 | Emmenegger 9 | (12–14) | Schreibmeierová 6 | Boris Trajkovski Sports Center, Skopje; Attendance: 30; Referees: Magalhães, Godoy (BRA) |
| 8 August 2022; 10:00 | 1× (yellow card) 2× (suspension) | Report | 2× (suspension) | Boris Trajkovski Sports Center, Skopje; Attendance: 30; Referees: Magalhães, Godoy (BRA) |

=== 17th place bracket ===
17–20th place semifinals
7 August
Montenegro | 31
Slovenia | 24
7 August
Faroe Islands | 23
Spain | 36

17th place game
8 August
Montenegro | 20
Spain | 26
19th place game
8 August
Slovenia | 28
Faroe Islands | 31

==== 17–20th place semifinals ====
| 7 August 2022; 17:00 | Montenegro | 31–24 | Slovenia | Jane Sandanski Arena Hall B, Skopje; Attendance: 77; Referees: Gheisarian, Gheisarian (IRI) |
| 7 August 2022; 17:00 | Vukčević 7 | (17–12) | Černigoj 12 | Jane Sandanski Arena Hall B, Skopje; Attendance: 77; Referees: Gheisarian, Gheisarian (IRI) |
| 7 August 2022; 17:00 | 3× (suspension) | Report | 1× (yellow card) 5× (suspension) | Jane Sandanski Arena Hall B, Skopje; Attendance: 77; Referees: Gheisarian, Gheisarian (IRI) |

| 7 August 2022; 20:00 | Faroe Islands | 23–36 | Spain | Jane Sandanski Arena Hall B, Skopje; Attendance: 81; Referees: Lončar, Lončar (CRO) |
| 7 August 2022; 20:00 | Arge 6 | (11–19) | Somaza 6 | Jane Sandanski Arena Hall B, Skopje; Attendance: 81; Referees: Lončar, Lončar (CRO) |
| 7 August 2022; 20:00 | 4× (suspension) | Report | 5× (suspension) | Jane Sandanski Arena Hall B, Skopje; Attendance: 81; Referees: Lončar, Lončar (CRO) |

==== 19th place game ====
| 8 August 2022; 17:00 | Slovenia | 28–31 | Faroe Islands | Jane Sandanski Arena Hall B, Skopje; Attendance: 68; Referees: Wenninger, Vranes (AUT) |
| 8 August 2022; 17:00 | three players 6 | (12–16) | Halsdóttir 8 | Jane Sandanski Arena Hall B, Skopje; Attendance: 68; Referees: Wenninger, Vranes (AUT) |
| 8 August 2022; 17:00 | 1× (yellow card) 3× (suspension) | Report | 2× (suspension) | Jane Sandanski Arena Hall B, Skopje; Attendance: 68; Referees: Wenninger, Vranes (AUT) |

==== 17th place game ====
| 8 August 2022; 16:00 | Montenegro | 20–26 | Spain | Jane Sandanski Arena, Skopje; Attendance: 75; Referees: Duplii, Pobedrina (UKR) |
| 8 August 2022; 16:00 | Marković, Vukčević 4 | (9–12) | Poles 6 | Jane Sandanski Arena, Skopje; Attendance: 75; Referees: Duplii, Pobedrina (UKR) |
| 8 August 2022; 16:00 | 2× (suspension) 1× (red card) | Report | 1× (suspension) | Jane Sandanski Arena, Skopje; Attendance: 75; Referees: Duplii, Pobedrina (UKR) |

=== 13th place bracket ===
13–16th place semifinals
7 August
Iran | 30
Romania | 38
7 August
Portugal | 35
Brazil | 21

13th place game
8 August
Romania | 32
Portugal | 35
15th place game
8 August
Iran | 26
Brazil | 29

==== 13–16th place semifinals ====
| 7 August 2022; 14:00 | Iran | 30–38 | Romania | Jane Sandanski Arena, Skopje; Attendance: 80; Referees: Antić, Jakovljević (SRB) |
| 7 August 2022; 14:00 | Merikhi 14 | (13–12) | Lixandroiu, Mihai 9 | Jane Sandanski Arena, Skopje; Attendance: 80; Referees: Antić, Jakovljević (SRB) |
| 7 August 2022; 14:00 | 1× (yellow card) 1× (suspension) | Report | 2× (suspension) 1× (red card) | Jane Sandanski Arena, Skopje; Attendance: 80; Referees: Antić, Jakovljević (SRB) |

| 7 August 2022; 16:00 | Portugal | 35–21 | Brazil | Jane Sandanski Arena, Skopje; Attendance: 45; Referees: Ismoilov, Ismoilov (UZB) |
| 7 August 2022; 16:00 | Rebelo 9 | (14–11) | Borges 5 | Jane Sandanski Arena, Skopje; Attendance: 45; Referees: Ismoilov, Ismoilov (UZB) |
| 7 August 2022; 16:00 | 2× (suspension) | Report | 5× (suspension) | Jane Sandanski Arena, Skopje; Attendance: 45; Referees: Ismoilov, Ismoilov (UZB) |

==== 15th place game ====
| 8 August 2022; 14:00 | Iran | 26–29 | Brazil | Jane Sandanski Arena, Skopje; Attendance: 35; Referees: Cheng, Zhou (CHN) |
| 8 August 2022; 14:00 | three players 5 | (10–8) | Borges 11 | Jane Sandanski Arena, Skopje; Attendance: 35; Referees: Cheng, Zhou (CHN) |
| 8 August 2022; 14:00 | 4× (suspension) | Report | 1× (yellow card) 2× (suspension) | Jane Sandanski Arena, Skopje; Attendance: 35; Referees: Cheng, Zhou (CHN) |

==== 13th place game ====
| 8 August 2022; 20:00 | Romania | 32–35 | Portugal | Jane Sandanski Arena Hall B, Skopje; Attendance: 87; Referees: Araújo, Perdomo (URU) |
| 8 August 2022; 20:00 | Lixandroiu 7 | (20–17) | Sequeira 13 | Jane Sandanski Arena Hall B, Skopje; Attendance: 87; Referees: Araújo, Perdomo (URU) |
| 8 August 2022; 20:00 | 1× (yellow card) 4× (suspension) | Report | 6× (suspension) | Jane Sandanski Arena Hall B, Skopje; Attendance: 87; Referees: Araújo, Perdomo (URU) |

=== Ninth place bracket ===
9–12th place semifinals
7 August
North Macedonia | 21
Germany | 34
7 August
Croatia | 30 (9)
Norway (Pen) | 30 (10)

Ninth place game
8 August
Germany | 24
Norway | 32
Eleventh place game
8 August
North Macedonia | 28
Croatia | 32

==== 9–12th place semifinals ====
7 August 2022
14:00
Croatia
39–40
Norway
Boris Trajkovski Sports Center, Skopje
Attendance: 130
Referees: Cheng, Zhou (CHN)
Bule 13
(14–14)
Hedenstad 12
2× (suspension)
Report
1× (yellow card) 1× (suspension)

FT: 30–30 Pen: 9–10

| 7 August 2022; 16:00 | North Macedonia | 21–34 | Germany | Boris Trajkovski Sports Center, Skopje; Attendance: 300; Referees: Araújo, Perdomo (URU) |
| 7 August 2022; 16:00 | Duskoska 5 | (12–17) | Leuchter 9 | Boris Trajkovski Sports Center, Skopje; Attendance: 300; Referees: Araújo, Perdomo (URU) |
| 7 August 2022; 16:00 | 1× (yellow card) 3× (suspension) | Report | 3× (suspension) | Boris Trajkovski Sports Center, Skopje; Attendance: 300; Referees: Araújo, Perdomo (URU) |

==== Eleventh place game ====
| 8 August 2022; 16:00 | North Macedonia | 28–32 | Croatia | Boris Trajkovski Sports Center, Skopje; Attendance: 200; Referees: Sá, Sá (POR) |
| 8 August 2022; 16:00 | Rizoska 9 | (10–20) | Žagar 9 | Boris Trajkovski Sports Center, Skopje; Attendance: 200; Referees: Sá, Sá (POR) |
| 8 August 2022; 16:00 | 1× (yellow card) 3× (suspension) | Report | 3× (suspension) | Boris Trajkovski Sports Center, Skopje; Attendance: 200; Referees: Sá, Sá (POR) |

==== Ninth place game ====
| 8 August 2022; 14:00 | Germany | 24–32 | Norway | Boris Trajkovski Sports Center, Skopje; Attendance: 60; Referees: Chouraki, El Mouniri (ALG) |
| 8 August 2022; 14:00 | three players 5 | (15–18) | Rosenberg 11 | Boris Trajkovski Sports Center, Skopje; Attendance: 60; Referees: Chouraki, El Mouniri (ALG) |
| 8 August 2022; 14:00 | 2× (suspension) 1× (red card) | Report | 3× (suspension) | Boris Trajkovski Sports Center, Skopje; Attendance: 60; Referees: Chouraki, El Mouniri (ALG) |

== Knockout stage ==
=== Bracket ===
Quarter-finals
7 August
Iceland | 26
Netherlands | 27
7 August
Denmark | 32
France | 26
7 August
South Korea | 33
Sweden | 27
7 August
Hungary | 28
Egypt | 23

Semi-finals
8 August
Netherlands | 21
Denmark | 37
8 August
South Korea | 30
Hungary | 29

Final
10 August
Denmark | 28
South Korea | 31
Third place
10 August
Netherlands | 26
Hungary | 27

=== Quarterfinals ===
| 7 August 2022; 18:15 | Iceland | 26–27 | Netherlands | Boris Trajkovski Sports Center, Skopje; Attendance: 150; Referees: Altmár, Horváth (HUN) |
| 7 August 2022; 18:15 | Ágústsdóttir 10 | (12–15) | Luchies 6 | Boris Trajkovski Sports Center, Skopje; Attendance: 150; Referees: Altmár, Horváth (HUN) |
| 7 August 2022; 18:15 | 2× (yellow card) | Report | 4× (suspension) | Boris Trajkovski Sports Center, Skopje; Attendance: 150; Referees: Altmár, Horváth (HUN) |

| 7 August 2022; 18:15 | Denmark | 32–26 | France | Jane Sandanski Arena, Skopje; Attendance: 97; Referees: Belkhiri, Hamidi (ALG) |
| 7 August 2022; 18:15 | Scaglione, Vestergaard 7 | (13–10) | L. Borg 8 | Jane Sandanski Arena, Skopje; Attendance: 97; Referees: Belkhiri, Hamidi (ALG) |
| 7 August 2022; 18:15 | 5× (suspension) | Report | 1× (yellow card) 4× (suspension) | Jane Sandanski Arena, Skopje; Attendance: 97; Referees: Belkhiri, Hamidi (ALG) |

| 7 August 2022; 20:30 | South Korea | 33–27 | Sweden | Boris Trajkovski Sports Center, Skopje; Attendance: 120; Referees: Bozhinovski, Nachevski (MKD) |
| 7 August 2022; 20:30 | Kim Se. 10 | (18–14) | Huselius, Wiksfors 6 | Boris Trajkovski Sports Center, Skopje; Attendance: 120; Referees: Bozhinovski, Nachevski (MKD) |
| 7 August 2022; 20:30 | 3× (suspension) | Report | 1× (yellow card) 2× (suspension) | Boris Trajkovski Sports Center, Skopje; Attendance: 120; Referees: Bozhinovski, Nachevski (MKD) |

| 7 August 2022; 20:30 | Hungary | 28–23 | Egypt | Jane Sandanski Arena, Skopje; Attendance: 150; Referees: Magalhães, Godoy (BRA) |
| 7 August 2022; 20:30 | Simon 9 | (12–10) | Hatem 5 | Jane Sandanski Arena, Skopje; Attendance: 150; Referees: Magalhães, Godoy (BRA) |
| 7 August 2022; 20:30 | 6× (suspension) | Report | 1× (yellow card) 4× (suspension) | Jane Sandanski Arena, Skopje; Attendance: 150; Referees: Magalhães, Godoy (BRA) |

=== 5–8th place bracket ===
5–8th place semifinals
8 August
Iceland | 29
France | 32
8 August
Sweden | 30
Egypt | 27

Fifth place game
10 August
France | 31
Sweden | 22
Seventh place game
10 August
Iceland | 31 (2)
Egypt (Pen) | 31 (4)

==== 5–8th place semifinals ====
| 8 August 2022; 18:15 | Iceland | 29–32 | France | Jane Sandanski Arena, Skopje; Attendance: 170; Referees: Burgos, Delgado (ARG) |
| 8 August 2022; 18:15 | Ásmundsdóttir 7 | (14–17) | L. Borg 10 | Jane Sandanski Arena, Skopje; Attendance: 170; Referees: Burgos, Delgado (ARG) |
| 8 August 2022; 18:15 | 1× (yellow card) 3× (suspension) | Report | 5× (suspension) | Jane Sandanski Arena, Skopje; Attendance: 170; Referees: Burgos, Delgado (ARG) |

| 8 August 2022; 20:30 | Sweden | 30–27 | Egypt | Jane Sandanski Arena, Skopje; Attendance: 75; Referees: Antić, Jakovljević (SRB) |
| 8 August 2022; 20:30 | Wahlberg 6 | (14–13) | Omar 8 | Jane Sandanski Arena, Skopje; Attendance: 75; Referees: Antić, Jakovljević (SRB) |
| 8 August 2022; 20:30 | 1× (yellow card) 2× (suspension) | Report | 3× (suspension) | Jane Sandanski Arena, Skopje; Attendance: 75; Referees: Antić, Jakovljević (SRB) |

==== Seventh place game ====
10 August 2022
11:45
Iceland
33–35
Egypt
Boris Trajkovski Sports Center, Skopje
Attendance: 60
Referees: Altmár, Horváth (HUN)
Ágústsdóttir 12
(16–12)
Kamel 6
2× (suspension)
Report
1× (yellow card) 2× (suspension)

FT: 31–31 Pen: 2–4

==== Fifth place game ====
| 10 August 2022; 13:45 | France | 31–22 | Sweden | Boris Trajkovski Sports Center, Skopje; Attendance: 100; Referees: Duplii, Pobedrina (UKR) |
| 10 August 2022; 13:45 | Perret 7 | (15–9) | Huselius, Mihailovic 5 | Boris Trajkovski Sports Center, Skopje; Attendance: 100; Referees: Duplii, Pobedrina (UKR) |
| 10 August 2022; 13:45 | 3× (suspension) | Report | 2× (suspension) | Boris Trajkovski Sports Center, Skopje; Attendance: 100; Referees: Duplii, Pobedrina (UKR) |

=== Semifinals ===
| 8 August 2022; 18:15 | Netherlands | 21–37 | Denmark | Boris Trajkovski Sports Center, Skopje; Attendance: 210; Referees: Bozhinovski, Nachevski (MKD) |
| 8 August 2022; 18:15 | Bakker 5 | (13–21) | Scaglione 8 | Boris Trajkovski Sports Center, Skopje; Attendance: 210; Referees: Bozhinovski, Nachevski (MKD) |
| 8 August 2022; 18:15 | 2× (yellow card) 4× (suspension) | Report | | Boris Trajkovski Sports Center, Skopje; Attendance: 210; Referees: Bozhinovski, Nachevski (MKD) |

| 8 August 2022; 20:30 | South Korea | 30–29 | Hungary | Boris Trajkovski Sports Center, Skopje; Attendance: 300; Referees: Doychinov, Goretsov (BUL) |
| 8 August 2022; 20:30 | Kim Se. 7 | (17–16) | Simon 9 | Boris Trajkovski Sports Center, Skopje; Attendance: 300; Referees: Doychinov, Goretsov (BUL) |
| 8 August 2022; 20:30 | 1× (yellow card) 3× (suspension) | Report | 1× (yellow card) 1× (suspension) | Boris Trajkovski Sports Center, Skopje; Attendance: 300; Referees: Doychinov, Goretsov (BUL) |

=== Third place game ===
| 10 August 2022; 16:00 | Netherlands | 26–27 | Hungary | Boris Trajkovski Sports Center, Skopje; Attendance: 300; Referees: Sá, Sá (POR) |
| 10 August 2022; 16:00 | Bakker 6 | (16–12) | Simon 9 | Boris Trajkovski Sports Center, Skopje; Attendance: 300; Referees: Sá, Sá (POR) |
| 10 August 2022; 16:00 | 1× (yellow card) 4× (suspension) | Report | 1× (yellow card) 4× (suspension) | Boris Trajkovski Sports Center, Skopje; Attendance: 300; Referees: Sá, Sá (POR) |

=== Final ===
| 10 August 2022; 18:15 | Denmark | 28–31 | South Korea | Boris Trajkovski Sports Center, Skopje; Attendance: 1,027; Referees: Belkhiri, Hamidi (ALG) |
| 10 August 2022; 18:15 | Scaglione 10 | (15–15) | Kim M. 9 | Boris Trajkovski Sports Center, Skopje; Attendance: 1,027; Referees: Belkhiri, Hamidi (ALG) |
| 10 August 2022; 18:15 | 3× (yellow card) 3× (suspension) | Report | 1× (yellow card) 4× (suspension) | Boris Trajkovski Sports Center, Skopje; Attendance: 1,027; Referees: Belkhiri, Hamidi (ALG) |

== Final ranking ==
| Rank | Team |
|---|---|
| 1st place, gold medalist(s) | South Korea |
| 2nd place, silver medalist(s) | Denmark |
| 3rd place, bronze medalist(s) | Hungary |
| 4 | Netherlands |
| 5 | France |
| 6 | Sweden |
| 7 | Egypt |
| 8 | Iceland |
| 9 | Norway |
| 10 | Germany |
| 11 | Croatia |
| 12 | North Macedonia |
| 13 | Portugal |
| 14 | Romania |
| 15 | Brazil |
| 16 | Iran |
| 17 | Spain |
| 18 | Montenegro |
| 19 | Faroe Islands |
| 20 | Slovenia |
| 21 | Switzerland |
| 22 | Czech Republic |
| 23 | Austria |
| 24 | Uzbekistan |
| 25 | Argentina |
| 26 | Slovakia |
| 27 | Kazakhstan |
| 28 | Senegal |
| 29 | Guinea |
| 30 | India |
| 31 | Uruguay |
| 32 | Algeria |

== Statistics and awards ==
=== Top goalscorers ===
| Rank | Name | Goals | Shots | % |
|---|---|---|---|---|
| 1 | (Denmark) Julie Scaglione | 62 | 96 | 65 |
| 2 | (South Korea) Kim Min-seo | 58 | 78 | 74 |
| 3 | (Croatia) Anđela Žagar | 56 | 98 | 57 |
| 3 | (Iceland) Lilja Ágústsdóttir | 56 | 78 | 72 |
| 3 | (Uzbekistan) Sevinch Erkabaeva | 56 | 108 | 52 |
| 6 | (Hungary) Petra Simon | 55 | 81 | 68 |
| 6 | (Iran) Fatemeh Merikhi | 55 | 82 | 67 |
| 8 | (South Korea) Kim Seo-jin | 53 | 73 | 73 |
| 9 | (Portugal) Constança Sequirea | 52 | 81 | 64 |
| 9 | (Sweden) Stella Huselius | 52 | 69 | 75 |

Source: IHF

=== Top goalkeepers ===
| Rank | Name | % | Saves | Shots |
|---|---|---|---|---|
| 1 | (Egypt) Yathreb Walid | 43 | 16 | 37 |
| 2 | (North Macedonia) Matea Churlonovska | 39 | 44 | 114 |
| 3 | (Montenegro) Aleksandra Bazović | 38 | 14 | 37 |
| 3 | (Montenegro) Marija Marsenić | 38 | 82 | 216 |
| 5 | (Portugal) Matilde Rosa | 37 | 53 | 143 |
| 6 | (Germany) Shana Wanda | 36 | 76 | 211 |
| 6 | (Iceland) Ethel Gyða Bjarnasen | 36 | 76 | 213 |
| 6 | (Sweden) Ella Johansson | 36 | 16 | 45 |
| 9 | (Denmark) Ida Kaysen | 35 | 62 | 179 |
| 9 | (Hungary) Szofi Imre | 35 | 25 | 72 |
| 9 | (Hungary) Klára Zaj | 35 | 43 | 123 |
| 9 | (Norway) Dina Frisendal | 35 | 36 | 103 |
| 9 | (Sweden) Line Bergfeldt | 35 | 56 | 161 |

Source: IHF

=== All-Star Team ===
The all-star team was announced on 10 August 2022.

| Position | Player |
|---|---|
| Goalkeeper | (Denmark) Ida Barholm |
| Left wing | (Sweden) Stella Huselius |
| Left back | (Denmark) Julie Scaglione |
| Centre back | (Hungary) Petra Simon |
| Right back | (South Korea) Lee Hye-won |
| Right wing | (South Korea) Cha Seo-yeon |
| Pivot | (Netherlands) Romée Maarschalkerweerd |
| MVP | (South Korea) Kim Min-seo |
