= Spain women's national youth handball team =

Spain

Information
- Association: Spanish Handball Federation
- Coach: Cristina Cabeza Gutiérrez

Colours
1st	2nd

Results

IHF U-18 World Championship
- Appearances: 7 (First in 2008)
- Best result: (gold) Champions (2024, 2026)

European Championship
- Appearances: 10 (First in 1997)
- Best result: (gold) Champions (1997)
- Last updated on Unknown.

The Spain women's youth national handball team is the national under–17 Handball team of Spain. Controlled by the Royal Spanish Handball Federation it represents the country in international matches.

== History ==
=== Youth Olympic Games ===
Champions Runners up Third place Fourth place

Youth Olympic Games record
Year	Round	Position	GP	W	D	L	GS	GA	GD
(Singapore) 2010	Did not Qualify								
(China) 2014	Did not Qualify								
(Argentina) 2018	No Handball Event								
(Senegal) 2022	No Handball Event								
Total	0 / 2	0 Titles							

=== World Championship ===
Champions Runners up Third place Fourth place

IHF Youth World Championship record
Year	Round	Position	GP	W	D	L	GS	GA	GD
(Canada) 2006	Did not qualify								
(Slovakia) 2008		5th place							
(Dominican Republic) 2010		5th place							
(Montenegro) 2012	Did not qualify								
(North Macedonia) 2014	Did not qualify								
(Slovakia) 2016		15th place							
(Poland) 2018		8th place							
(Croatia) 2020	Cancelled								
(North Macedonia) 2022		17th place							
(China) 2024		1st place							
(Romania) 2026		1st place							
Total	7 / 10	2 Titles							

=== European Championship ===
Champions Runners up Third place Fourth place

European Championship record
Year	Round	Position	GP	W	D	L	GS	GA	GD
(Hungary) 1992	Didn't Qualify								
(Lithuania) 1994	Didn't Qualify								
(Austria) 1997	Final	Champions							
(Germany) 1999	Didn't Qualify								
(Turkey) 2001		5th place							
(Russia) 2003		9th place							
(Austria) 2005		13th place							
(Slovakia) 2007	Final	Runners-Up							
(Serbia) 2009		8th place							
(Czech Republic) 2011		11th place							
(Poland) 2013		13th place							
(North Macedonia) 2015		10th place							
(Slovakia) 2017		8th place							
Total	10 / 13	1 Title							
