= South and Central American Women's Youth Handball Championship =

Handball competition

- Current season, competition or edition: 2025 South and Central American Women's Youth Handball Championship
- Sport: Handball
- Founded: 2022
- First season: 2022
- Continent: SCAHC (South America/Central America)
- Most recent champion: Argentina (1st title)
- Most titles: Brazil (2 titles)

The South and Central American Women's Youth Handball Championship is the official competition for junior national handball teams of South America and Central America, and takes place every two years. In addition to crowning the South and Central American youth champions, the tournament also serves as a qualifying tournament for the World U18 Championship. The first tournament was held in 2022 in Taubaté, Brazil.

== Summaries ==
Year	Host	Final			Third place match		
Year	Host	Champion	Score	Runner-up	Third place	Score	Fourth place
2022; Details	(Brazil); Taubaté	Brazil	Round-robin	Argentina	Uruguay	Round-robin	Chile
2023; Details	(Argentina); Buenos Aires	Brazil	26–23	Argentina	Chile	23–22	Uruguay
2025; Details	(Paraguay); Asunción	Argentina	23–22	Brazil	Uruguay	26–23	Paraguay

== Medal table ==
Rank	Nation	Gold	Silver	Bronze	Total
1	Brazil	2	1	0	3
2	Argentina	1	2	0	3
3	Uruguay	0	0	2	2
4	Chile	0	0	1	1
Totals (4 entries)		3	3	3	9

== Participating nations ==
Team	(Brazil); 2022	(Argentina); 2023	(Paraguay); 2025	Years
Argentina	2nd	2nd	1st	3
Brazil	1st	1st	2nd	3
Chile	4th	3rd	5th	3
Colombia		6th		1
Costa Rica			9th	1
Guatemala		5th	7th	2
Nicaragua		8th		1
Paraguay	5th		4th	2
Peru			8th	1
Uruguay	3rd	4th	3rd	3
Venezuela		7th	6th	2
Total	5	8	9	
