= Netherlands women's national youth handball team =

National under-17 handball team

Netherlands

Information
- Association: Netherlands Handball Association
- Coach: Michael Vijverberg

Colours
| 1st | 2nd |

Results

IHF U-18 World Championship
- Appearances: 8 (First in 2008)
- Best result: (bronze) Third place (2010)

European Championship
- Appearances: 8 (First in 2001)
- Best result: (bronze) Third place (2007)
- Last updated on Unknown.

The Netherlands women's youth national handball team is the national under–17 Handball team of the Netherlands. Controlled by the Netherlands Handball Association it represents the country in international matches.

== History ==
=== Youth Olympic Games ===
Champions Runners up Third place Fourth place

Youth Olympic Games record
| Year | Round | Position | GP | W | D | L | GS | GA | GD |
|---|---|---|---|---|---|---|---|---|---|
| (Singapore) 2010 | Didn't Qualify | | | | | | | | |
| (China) 2014 | Didn't Qualify | | | | | | | | |
| (Argentina) 2018 | No Handball Event | | | | | | | | |
| (Senegal) 2022 | No Handball Event | | | | | | | | |
| Total | 0 / 2 | 0 Titles | | | | | | | |

=== IHF World Championship ===
Champions Runners up Third place Fourth place

IHF Youth World Championship record
| Year | Round | Position | GP | W | D | L | GS | GA | GD |
|---|---|---|---|---|---|---|---|---|---|
| (Canada) 2006 | Didn't Qualify | | | | | | | | |
| (Slovakia) 2008 | | 9th place | | | | | | | |
| (Dominican Republic) 2010 | Semi-finals | Third place | | | | | | | |
| (Montenegro) 2012 | | 10th place | | | | | | | |
| (North Macedonia) 2014 | | 6th place | | | | | | | |
| (Slovakia) 2016 | Did not Qualify | | | | | | | | |
| (Poland) 2018 | | 7th place | | | | | | | |
| (Croatia) 2020 | Cancelled | | | | | | | | |
| (Georgia (country)) 2022 | | | 4th place | | | | | | |
| (China) 2024 | | | 16th place | | | | | | |
| (Romania) 2026 | | | 11th place | | | | | | |
| Total | 8 / 10 | 0 Titles | | | | | | | |

=== European Championship ===
Champions Runners up Third place Fourth place

European Championship record
| Year | Round | Position | GP | W | D | L | GS | GA | GD |
|---|---|---|---|---|---|---|---|---|---|
| (Hungary) 1992 | Didn't Qualify | | | | | | | | |
| (Lithuania) 1994 | Didn't Qualify | | | | | | | | |
| (Austria) 1997 | Didn't Qualify | | | | | | | | |
| (Germany) 1999 | Didn't Qualify | | | | | | | | |
| (Turkey) 2001 | | 6th place | | | | | | | |
| (Russia) 2003 | | 6th place | | | | | | | |
| (Austria) 2005 | Didn't Qualify | | | | | | | | |
| (Slovakia) 2007 | Semi-finals | Third place | | | | | | | |
| (Serbia) 2009 | | 6th place | | | | | | | |
| (Czech Republic) 2011 | | 8th place | | | | | | | |
| (Poland) 2013 | | 12th place | | | | | | | |
| (North Macedonia) 2015 | | 12th place | | | | | | | |
| (Slovakia) 2017 | | 10th place | | | | | | | |
| Total | 8 / 13 | 0 Titles | | | | | | | |
