= 2023 South and Central American Women's Youth Handball Championship =

Tournament details
- Host country: Argentina
- Venue: 1 (in 1 host city)
- Dates: 21–25 November
- Teams: 8 (from 1 confederation)

Final positions
- Champions: Brazil (2nd title)
- Runners-up: Argentina
- Third place: Chile
- Fourth place: Uruguay

Tournament statistics
- Matches played: 20
- Goals scored: 1,003 (50.15 per match)

The 2023 South and Central American Women's Youth Handball Championship took place in Buenos Aires, Argentina, at La Casa del Handball Argentino stadium from 21 to 25 November 2023. It acted as the South and Central American qualifying tournament for the 2024 Women's Youth World Handball Championship.

== Qualification ==
Competition	Dates	Host	Vacancies	Qualified
Automatic qualifiers			4	Argentina; Brazil; Chile; Uruguay
IHF Trophy South and Central America – Central American Zone	9–13 May 2023	Guatemala City	2	Guatemala; Nicaragua
IHF Trophy South and Central America – South American Zone	6–10 June 2023	(Peru) Lima	2	Colombia; Venezuela

== Preliminary round ==
All times are local (UTC–3).

=== Group A ===
Pos	Team	Pld	W	D	L	GF	GA	GD	Pts	Qualification
1	Brazil	3	3	0	0	121	46	+75	6	Semifinals
2	Chile	3	2	0	1	84	77	+7	4	Semifinals
3	Guatemala	3	1	0	2	68	90	−22	2	5–8th place semifinals
4	Colombia	3	0	0	3	47	107	−60	0	5–8th place semifinals

Source: SCAHC
Rules for classification: 1) Points; 2) Head-to-head points; 3) Head-to-head goal difference; 4) Head-to-head goals scored; 5) Goal difference; 6) Goals scored; 7) Draw.

21 November 2023; 14:00	Chile	36–15	Colombia	La Casa del Handball Argentino, Buenos Aires; Attendance: 100
21 November 2023; 14:00		(19–7)		La Casa del Handball Argentino, Buenos Aires; Attendance: 100
21 November 2023; 14:00		Report		La Casa del Handball Argentino, Buenos Aires; Attendance: 100

21 November 2023; 18:00	Brazil	43–13	Guatemala	La Casa del Handball Argentino, Buenos Aires; Attendance: 40
21 November 2023; 18:00		(19–6)		La Casa del Handball Argentino, Buenos Aires; Attendance: 40
21 November 2023; 18:00		Report		La Casa del Handball Argentino, Buenos Aires; Attendance: 40

22 November 2023; 14:00	Colombia	14–42	Brazil	La Casa del Handball Argentino, Buenos Aires; Attendance: 160
22 November 2023; 14:00		(7–21)		La Casa del Handball Argentino, Buenos Aires; Attendance: 160
22 November 2023; 14:00		Report		La Casa del Handball Argentino, Buenos Aires; Attendance: 160

22 November 2023; 16:00	Guatemala	26–29	Chile	La Casa del Handball Argentino, Buenos Aires; Attendance: 160
22 November 2023; 16:00		(10–15)		La Casa del Handball Argentino, Buenos Aires; Attendance: 160
22 November 2023; 16:00		Report		La Casa del Handball Argentino, Buenos Aires; Attendance: 160

23 November 2023; 16:00	Guatemala	29–18	Colombia	La Casa del Handball Argentino, Buenos Aires; Attendance: 150
23 November 2023; 16:00		(16–10)		La Casa del Handball Argentino, Buenos Aires; Attendance: 150
23 November 2023; 16:00		Report		La Casa del Handball Argentino, Buenos Aires; Attendance: 150

23 November 2023; 18:00	Brazil	36–19	Chile	La Casa del Handball Argentino, Buenos Aires; Attendance: 120
23 November 2023; 18:00		(16–9)		La Casa del Handball Argentino, Buenos Aires; Attendance: 120
23 November 2023; 18:00		Report		La Casa del Handball Argentino, Buenos Aires; Attendance: 120

=== Group B ===
Pos	Team	Pld	W	D	L	GF	GA	GD	Pts	Qualification
1	Argentina (H)	3	3	0	0	121	40	+81	6	Semifinals
2	Uruguay	3	2	0	1	101	47	+54	4	Semifinals
3	Venezuela	3	1	0	2	57	84	−27	2	5–8th place semifinals
4	Nicaragua	3	0	0	3	24	132	−108	0	5–8th place semifinals

Source: SCAHC
Rules for classification: 1) Points; 2) Head-to-head points; 3) Head-to-head goal difference; 4) Head-to-head goals scored; 5) Goal difference; 6) Goals scored; 7) Draw.
(H) Hosts

21 November 2023; 16:00	Uruguay	44–7	Nicaragua	La Casa del Handball Argentino, Buenos Aires; Attendance: 60
21 November 2023; 16:00		(17–4)		La Casa del Handball Argentino, Buenos Aires; Attendance: 60
21 November 2023; 16:00		Report		La Casa del Handball Argentino, Buenos Aires; Attendance: 60

21 November 2023; 20:00	Argentina	38–12	Venezuela	La Casa del Handball Argentino, Buenos Aires; Attendance: 750; Referees: Araújo, Cardoso (BRA)
21 November 2023; 20:00	Trejo 6	(17–8)	Torrelles 4	La Casa del Handball Argentino, Buenos Aires; Attendance: 750; Referees: Araújo, Cardoso (BRA)
21 November 2023; 20:00	3× (suspension)	Report	1× (yellow card) 7× (suspension) 1× (red card)	La Casa del Handball Argentino, Buenos Aires; Attendance: 750; Referees: Araújo, Cardoso (BRA)

22 November 2023; 18:00	Venezuela	12–37	Uruguay	La Casa del Handball Argentino, Buenos Aires; Attendance: 175
22 November 2023; 18:00		(7–19)		La Casa del Handball Argentino, Buenos Aires; Attendance: 175
22 November 2023; 18:00		Report		La Casa del Handball Argentino, Buenos Aires; Attendance: 175

22 November 2023; 20:00	Nicaragua	8–55	Argentina	La Casa del Handball Argentino, Buenos Aires; Attendance: 930; Referees: Gutiérrez, Cofre (CHI)
22 November 2023; 20:00	four players 2	(1–33)	Trejo 12	La Casa del Handball Argentino, Buenos Aires; Attendance: 930; Referees: Gutiérrez, Cofre (CHI)
22 November 2023; 20:00	4× (suspension)	Report	1× (suspension)	La Casa del Handball Argentino, Buenos Aires; Attendance: 930; Referees: Gutiérrez, Cofre (CHI)

23 November 2023; 14:00	Venezuela	33–9	Nicaragua	La Casa del Handball Argentino, Buenos Aires; Attendance: 100
23 November 2023; 14:00		(16–4)		La Casa del Handball Argentino, Buenos Aires; Attendance: 100
23 November 2023; 14:00		Report		La Casa del Handball Argentino, Buenos Aires; Attendance: 100

23 November 2023; 20:00	Argentina	28–20	Uruguay	La Casa del Handball Argentino, Buenos Aires; Referees: Aguilera, Gutiérrez (CHI)
23 November 2023; 20:00	Patrone, Vitali 4	(12–7)	Luissi 4	La Casa del Handball Argentino, Buenos Aires; Referees: Aguilera, Gutiérrez (CHI)
23 November 2023; 20:00	1× (yellow card) 1× (suspension)	Report	1× (yellow card) 3× (suspension)	La Casa del Handball Argentino, Buenos Aires; Referees: Aguilera, Gutiérrez (CHI)

== Knockout stage ==
=== Bracket ===
Semi-finals
24 November
Argentina	31
Chile	20
24 November
Brazil	26
Uruguay	15

Final
25 November
Argentina	23
Brazil	26
Third place
25 November
Uruguay	22
Chile	23

5–8th place bracket

5–8th place semifinals
24 November
Guatemala	40
Nicaragua	13
24 November
Venezuela	23
Colombia	24

Fifth place
25 November
Guatemala	24
Colombia	18
Seventh place
25 November
Nicaragua	16
Venezuela	36

=== 5–8th place semifinals ===
24 November 2023; 14:00	Guatemala	40–13	Nicaragua	La Casa del Handball Argentino, Buenos Aires; Attendance: 97
24 November 2023; 14:00		(15–6)		La Casa del Handball Argentino, Buenos Aires; Attendance: 97
24 November 2023; 14:00		Report		La Casa del Handball Argentino, Buenos Aires; Attendance: 97

24 November 2023; 16:00	Venezuela	23–24	Colombia	La Casa del Handball Argentino, Buenos Aires; Attendance: 77
24 November 2023; 16:00		(15–12)		La Casa del Handball Argentino, Buenos Aires; Attendance: 77
24 November 2023; 16:00		Report		La Casa del Handball Argentino, Buenos Aires; Attendance: 77

=== Semifinals ===
24 November 2023; 18:00	Brazil	26–15	Uruguay	La Casa del Handball Argentino, Buenos Aires; Attendance: 370
24 November 2023; 18:00		(9–10)		La Casa del Handball Argentino, Buenos Aires; Attendance: 370
24 November 2023; 18:00		Report		La Casa del Handball Argentino, Buenos Aires; Attendance: 370

24 November 2023; 20:00	Argentina	31–20	Chile	La Casa del Handball Argentino, Buenos Aires
24 November 2023; 20:00		(20–12)		La Casa del Handball Argentino, Buenos Aires
24 November 2023; 20:00		Report		La Casa del Handball Argentino, Buenos Aires

=== Seventh place game ===
25 November 2023; 14:00	Nicaragua	16–36	Venezuela	La Casa del Handball Argentino, Buenos Aires
25 November 2023; 14:00		(7–18)		La Casa del Handball Argentino, Buenos Aires
25 November 2023; 14:00		Report		La Casa del Handball Argentino, Buenos Aires

=== Fifth place game ===
25 November 2023; 16:00	Guatemala	24–18	Colombia	La Casa del Handball Argentino, Buenos Aires; Attendance: 100
25 November 2023; 16:00		(11–9)		La Casa del Handball Argentino, Buenos Aires; Attendance: 100
25 November 2023; 16:00		Report		La Casa del Handball Argentino, Buenos Aires; Attendance: 100

=== Third place game ===
25 November 2023; 18:00	Uruguay	22–23	Chile	La Casa del Handball Argentino, Buenos Aires; Attendance: 450
25 November 2023; 18:00		(11–10)		La Casa del Handball Argentino, Buenos Aires; Attendance: 450
25 November 2023; 18:00		Report		La Casa del Handball Argentino, Buenos Aires; Attendance: 450

=== Final ===
25 November 2023; 20:00	Argentina	23–26	Brazil	La Casa del Handball Argentino, Buenos Aires; Attendance: 2,500
25 November 2023; 20:00		(11–12)		La Casa del Handball Argentino, Buenos Aires; Attendance: 2,500
25 November 2023; 20:00		Report		La Casa del Handball Argentino, Buenos Aires; Attendance: 2,500

== Final standing ==
Rank	Team
1st place, gold medalist(s)	Brazil
2nd place, silver medalist(s)	Argentina
3rd place, bronze medalist(s)	Chile
4	Uruguay
5	Guatemala
6	Colombia
7	Venezuela
8	Nicaragua

Qualified for the 2024 Women's Youth World Championship
Qualified for the 2024 IHF Inter-Continental Trophy

2023 South and Central American Women's Youth Champions

Brazil
Second title

Team roster: Mellysse de Souza, Sophia Ludwig, Beatriz Rodrigues, Luana Flores, Giulia Lessa, Lauendy Vitória, Raquel Cardoso, Andressa Souza, Julia Vitória, Bárbara Rosa, Letícia Grassmann, Sofia Van Lieshout, Ana Karolina Gonçalves, Jisseli Monteiro, Maria Luiza Kozar, Nhauany Teixeira.
Head coach: Mauricio Antonucci.
