= 2022 South and Central American Women's Youth Handball Championship =

Handball Championship

Tournament details
- Host country: Brazil
- Venue: 1 (in 1 host city)
- Dates: 26–30 April
- Teams: 5 (from 1 confederation)

Final positions
- Champions: Brazil (1st title)
- Runners-up: Argentina
- Third place: Uruguay
- Fourth place: Chile

Tournament statistics
- Matches played: 10
- Goals scored: 494 (49.4 per match)
- Attendance: 2,356 (236 per match)
- Top scorers: (Brazil) Kelly Rosa (29 goals)

The 2022 South and Central American Women's Youth Handball Championship was the first edition of the tournament, took place in Taubaté, Brazil, from 26 to 30 April 2022. It acted as the South and Central American qualifying tournament for the 2022 Women's Youth World Handball Championship.

== Standings ==
| Pos | Team | Pld | W | D | L | GF | GA | GD | Pts | Qualification |
|---|---|---|---|---|---|---|---|---|---|---|
| 1st place, gold medalist(s) | Brazil (H) | 4 | 4 | 0 | 0 | 134 | 81 | +53 | 8 | 2022 Youth World Championship |
| 2nd place, silver medalist(s) | Argentina | 4 | 3 | 0 | 1 | 103 | 88 | +15 | 6 | 2022 Youth World Championship |
| 3rd place, bronze medalist(s) | Uruguay | 4 | 1 | 1 | 2 | 86 | 97 | −11 | 3 | 2022 Youth World Championship |
| 4 | Chile | 4 | 0 | 2 | 2 | 81 | 111 | −30 | 2 | |
| 5 | Paraguay | 4 | 0 | 1 | 3 | 90 | 117 | −27 | 1 | |

Rules for classification: 1) points; 2) head-to-head points; 3) head-to-head goal difference; 4) head-to-head goals scored; 5) goal difference; 6) goals scored; 7) draw.
(H) Hosts

== Results ==
All times are local (UTC–3).

| 26 April 2022; 16:00 | Argentina | 27–26 | Paraguay | Ginásio Emecal, Taubaté; Attendance: 120; Referees: Magalhães, Godoy (BRA) |
| 26 April 2022; 16:00 | Spinelli 8 | (12–10) | Méndez 6 | Ginásio Emecal, Taubaté; Attendance: 120; Referees: Magalhães, Godoy (BRA) |
| 26 April 2022; 16:00 | 1× (yellow card) 4× (suspension) | Report | 5× (suspension) | Ginásio Emecal, Taubaté; Attendance: 120; Referees: Magalhães, Godoy (BRA) |

| 26 April 2022; 18:30 | Brazil | 37–20 | Uruguay | Ginásio Emecal, Taubaté; Attendance: 200; Referees: Araújo, Perdomo (URU) |
| 26 April 2022; 18:30 | Rosa, Soares 8 | (18–13) | Guichón 6 | Ginásio Emecal, Taubaté; Attendance: 200; Referees: Araújo, Perdomo (URU) |
| 26 April 2022; 18:30 | 2× (yellow card) 3× (suspension) | Report | 3× (suspension) | Ginásio Emecal, Taubaté; Attendance: 200; Referees: Araújo, Perdomo (URU) |

| 27 April 2022; 16:00 | Chile | 15–15 | Uruguay | Ginásio Emecal, Taubaté; Attendance: 247; Referees: Godoy, Magalhães (BRA) |
| 27 April 2022; 16:00 | De la Barra, Paul 3 | (5–9) | Heilmann 5 | Ginásio Emecal, Taubaté; Attendance: 247; Referees: Godoy, Magalhães (BRA) |
| 27 April 2022; 16:00 | 1× (yellow card) 2× (suspension) | Report | 1× (yellow card) 2× (suspension) | Ginásio Emecal, Taubaté; Attendance: 247; Referees: Godoy, Magalhães (BRA) |

| 27 April 2022; 18:00 | Paraguay | 15–30 | Brazil | Ginásio Emecal, Taubaté; Attendance: 250; Referees: Giampietro, Tabarez (ARG) |
| 27 April 2022; 18:00 | Méndez, Sosa 3 | (6–10) | Rosa 5 | Ginásio Emecal, Taubaté; Attendance: 250; Referees: Giampietro, Tabarez (ARG) |
| 27 April 2022; 18:00 | 1× (yellow card) 6× (suspension) | Report | 1× (yellow card) 3× (suspension) | Ginásio Emecal, Taubaté; Attendance: 250; Referees: Giampietro, Tabarez (ARG) |

| 28 April 2022; 16:00 | Uruguay | 32–21 | Paraguay | Ginásio Emecal, Taubaté; Attendance: 130; Referees: Godoy, Magalhães (BRA) |
| 28 April 2022; 16:00 | Campos 6 | (16–10) | Cantero 9 | Ginásio Emecal, Taubaté; Attendance: 130; Referees: Godoy, Magalhães (BRA) |
| 28 April 2022; 16:00 | 1× (yellow card) 5× (suspension) 1× (red card) | Report | 3× (yellow card) 6× (suspension) 1× (red card) | Ginásio Emecal, Taubaté; Attendance: 130; Referees: Godoy, Magalhães (BRA) |

| 28 April 2022; 18:00 | Chile | 17–27 | Argentina | Ginásio Emecal, Taubaté; Attendance: 322; Referees: Araújo, Perdomo (URU) |
| 28 April 2022; 18:00 | Jara 6 | (11–15) | Tajes 5 | Ginásio Emecal, Taubaté; Attendance: 322; Referees: Araújo, Perdomo (URU) |
| 28 April 2022; 18:00 | 4× (suspension) | Report | 1× (yellow card) 3× (suspension) | Ginásio Emecal, Taubaté; Attendance: 322; Referees: Araújo, Perdomo (URU) |

| 29 April 2022; 16:00 | Paraguay | 28–28 | Chile | Ginásio Emecal, Taubaté; Attendance: 300; Referees: Godoy, Magalhães (BRA) |
| 29 April 2022; 16:00 | Cantero 6 | (17–14) | De la Barra, Sepúlveda 6 | Ginásio Emecal, Taubaté; Attendance: 300; Referees: Godoy, Magalhães (BRA) |
| 29 April 2022; 16:00 | 2× (yellow card) 2× (suspension) 1× (red card) | Report | 1× (yellow card) 6× (suspension) | Ginásio Emecal, Taubaté; Attendance: 300; Referees: Godoy, Magalhães (BRA) |

| 29 April 2022; 18:00 | Brazil | 26–25 | Argentina | Ginásio Emecal, Taubaté; Attendance: 300; Referees: Araújo, Perdomo (URU) |
| 29 April 2022; 18:00 | Rosa 12 | (14–14) | Layus 8 | Ginásio Emecal, Taubaté; Attendance: 300; Referees: Araújo, Perdomo (URU) |
| 29 April 2022; 18:00 | 1× (yellow card) 5× (suspension) 1× (red card) | Report | 2× (yellow card) 4× (suspension) | Ginásio Emecal, Taubaté; Attendance: 300; Referees: Araújo, Perdomo (URU) |

| 30 April 2022; 16:00 | Argentina | 24–19 | Uruguay | Ginásio Emecal, Taubaté; Attendance: 247; Referees: Godoy, Magalhães (BRA) |
| 30 April 2022; 16:00 | Tajes 5 | (11–6) | Barthaburu 5 | Ginásio Emecal, Taubaté; Attendance: 247; Referees: Godoy, Magalhães (BRA) |
| 30 April 2022; 16:00 | 2× (yellow card) 4× (suspension) | Report | 1× (yellow card) 3× (suspension) | Ginásio Emecal, Taubaté; Attendance: 247; Referees: Godoy, Magalhães (BRA) |

| 30 April 2022; 18:00 | Brazil | 41–21 | Chile | Ginásio Emecal, Taubaté; Attendance: 240; Referees: Giampietro, Tabarez (ARG) |
| 30 April 2022; 18:00 | Pereira 8 | (23–9) | De la Barra, Valdivia 4 | Ginásio Emecal, Taubaté; Attendance: 240; Referees: Giampietro, Tabarez (ARG) |
| 30 April 2022; 18:00 | 1× (yellow card) 3× (suspension) | Report | 2× (suspension) | Ginásio Emecal, Taubaté; Attendance: 240; Referees: Giampietro, Tabarez (ARG) |

== Team champion roster ==
2022 South and Central American Women's Youth Champions

Brazil
First title

Team roster: Manuella Navarro, Vitoria Andrade, Julia Rodrigues, Elisa Gosson, Gabriella Pereira, Kelly Rosa, Livia Freitas, Ana Carolini Gonçalves, Eduarda Oliveira, Julia Machado, Patricia Kaefer, Yasmin Paz, Nathaly Soares, Yasmin Ferreira, Maria Elisa Silva, Milene Queiroz.
Head coach: Mauricio Antonucci.
