= Kelly Rosa =

Brazilian handball player

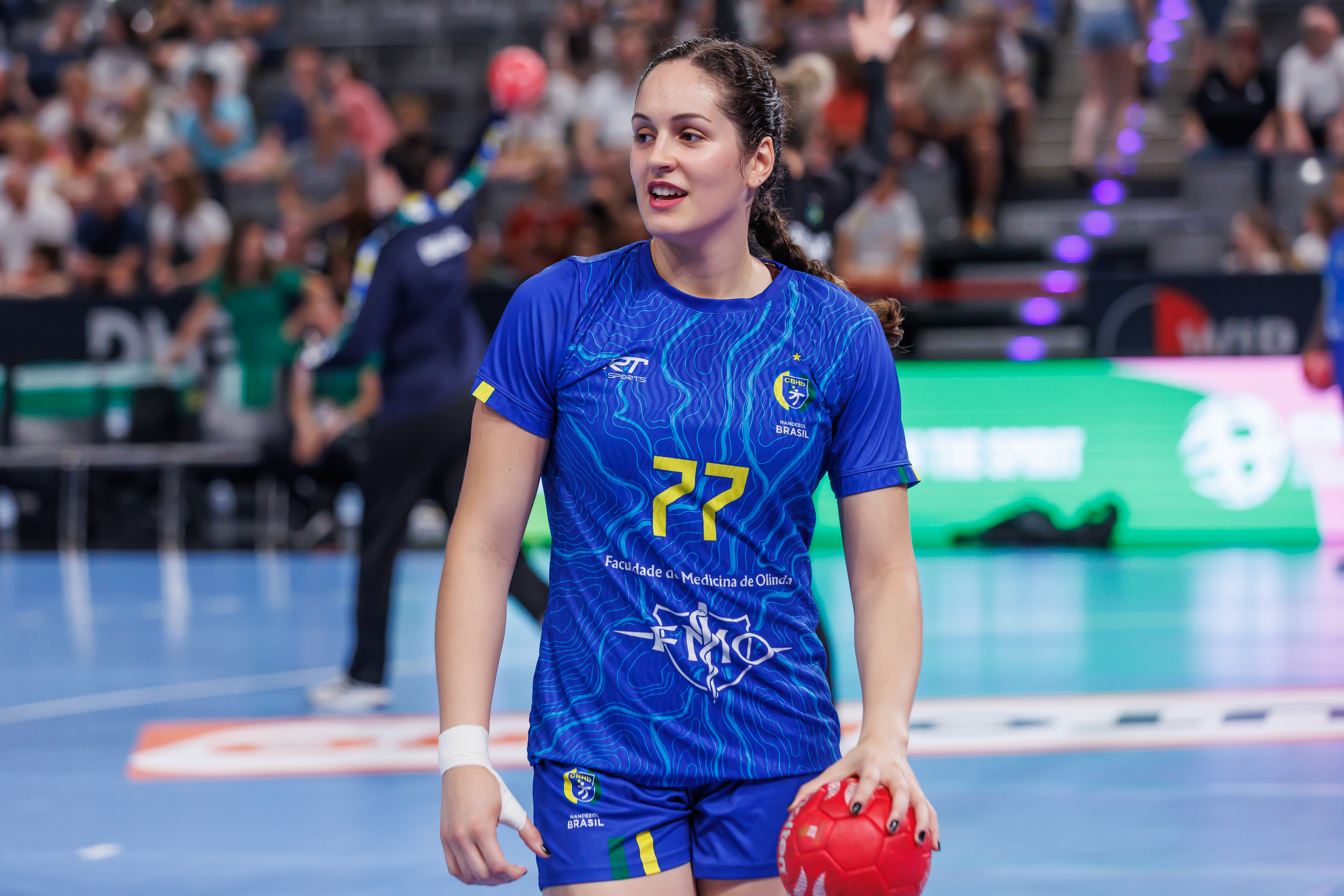
- Kelly Rosa in 2024

Personal information
- Full name: Kelly de Abreu Rosa
- Nationality: Brazilian
- Born: 25 January 2004 (age 22) Brasília, Brazil
- Height: 178 cm (70 in)

Sport
- Sport: Handball
- Position: left back
- Current club: Thüringer HC
- Number: 77

Senior clubs
- Years: Team
- –2022: EC Pinheiros
- 2023: CB Sporting La Rioja
- 2023–2025: CB Elche
- 2025: Dunaújvárosi Kohász KA
- 2025–: Thüringer HC
National team
| Years | Team | Apps | (Gls) |
| – | Brazil | 33 | (73) |
Medal record
South and Central American Championship
| Gold medal – first place | 2024 Brazil |
South and Central American Youth Championship
| Gold medal – first place | 2022 Brazil |
- Updated on 23 December 2025

Kelly De Abreu Rosa (born 25 January 2004) is a Brazilian handballer.

== Career ==
Rosa started her career at EC Pinheiros in her home country. In 2023 she joined Spanish team CB Sporting La Rioja. Later the same year she joined league rivals CB Elche. Here she won the 2023-24 EHF European League.

For the 2025-26 season she joined Hungarian Dunaújvárosi Kohász KA. Already in the December the same year she joined German Thüringer HC.

== National team ==
Rosa represented Brazil at the 2023 World Championship, where Brazil finished 9th. She scored 15 goals durin the tournament.

She also represented Brazil at the 2024 Summer Olympics.

A year after she played at the 2025 World Women's Handball Championship, where Brazil finished 6th.

== Achievements ==
=== Titles ===
- 2023-24 EHF European League Winner

=== Awards ===
- 2022 South and Central American Women's Youth Handball Championship: Top scorer
