= Brazil women's national youth handball team =

Brazil

Information
- Association: Brazil Handball Federation
- Coach: Mauricio Antonucci

Colours
1st	2nd

Results

Youth Olympic Games
- Appearances: 2 (First in 2010)
- Best result: (bronze) Bronze Medal (2010)

IHF U-18 World Championship
- Appearances: 9 (First in 2006)
- Best result: 7th place (2014)
- Last updated on Unknown.

The Brazil women's youth national handball team is the national under-17 handball team of Brazil. Controlled by the Brazilian Handball Confederation that is an affiliate of the International Handball Federation IHF and also a part of the South and Central America Handball Confederation SCAHC. The team represents the country in international matches.

== History ==
=== Youth Olympic Games ===
Champions Runners up Third place Fourth place

Youth Olympic Games record
Year	Round	Position	GP	W	D	L	GS	GA	GD
(Singapore) 2010		3rd place							
(China) 2014		4th place							
Total	2 / 2	0 Titles							

=== IHF World Championship ===
Champions Runners up Third place Fourth place

IHF Youth World Championship record
Year	Round	Position	GP	W	D	L	GS	GA
(Canada) 2006	Group round	9th place	5	2	0	3	134	130
(Slovakia) 2008	Placement round	10th place	6	3	0	3	174	142
(Dominican Republic) 2010	Placement round	13th place	6	3	0	3	192	165
(Montenegro) 2012	Placement round	12th place	6	2	0	4	145	169
(North Macedonia) 2014	Placement round	7th place	9	6	0	3	289	232
(Slovakia) 2016	Placement round	12th place	7	3	0	4	177	153
(Poland) 2018	Didn't Qualify							
(Croatia) 2020	Cancelled due COVID-19 pandemic							
(North Macedonia) 2022	Placement round	15th place	7	2	1	4	161	200
(China) 2024	Placement round	11th place	7	4	0	3	185	170
(Romania) 2026	Placement round	19th place	7	4	0	3	211	187
Total	9 / 10	0 Titles	60	29	1	30	1668	1548

=== South and Central American Championship ===
Year	Round	Position	GP	W	D	L	GS	GA	GD
2022 (Brazil)	round robin	1st place	4	4	0	0	134	81	+53
2023 (Argentina)	final	1st place	5	5	0	0	173	84	+99
Total	2/2	2 Titles	9	9	0	0	307	152	+155
