= Argentina women's national youth handball team =

Argentina

Information
- Association: Argentina Handball Federation
- Coach: Gastón González

Colours
1st	2nd

Results

Youth Olympic Games
- Appearances: No Appearances

IHF U-18 World Championship
- Appearances: 9 (First in 2006)
- Best result: 6th place (2006)
- Last updated on Unknown.

The Argentina women's youth national handball team is the national under-17 handball team of Argentina. Controlled by the Argentinean Handball Confederation that is an affiliate of the International Handball Federation and also a part of the South and Central America Handball Confederation, the team represents the country in international matches.

== History ==
=== Youth Olympic Games ===
Champions Runners up Third place Fourth place

Youth Olympic Games record
Year	Round	Position	GP	W	D	L	GS	GA	GD
(Singapore) 2010	Didn't Qualify								
(China) 2014	Didn't Qualify								
Total	0 / 2	0 Titles							

=== IHF World Championship ===
Champions Runners up Third place Fourth place

IHF Youth World Championship record
Year	Round	Position	GP	W	D	L	GS	GA	GD
(Canada) 2006		6th place							
(Slovakia) 2008		11th place							
(Dominican Republic) 2010		17th place							
(Montenegro) 2012	Didn't Qualify								
(North Macedonia) 2014		12th place							
(Slovakia) 2016		18th place							
(Poland) 2018		20th place							
(Croatia) 2020		Cancelled							
(Georgia (country)) 2022		25th place							
(China) 2024		18th place							
(Romania) 2026		23rd place							
Total	9 / 10	0 Titles							

=== South and Central American Championship ===
Year	Round	Position	GP	W	D	L	GS	GA	GD
2022 (Brazil)	round robin	2nd place	4	3	0	1	103	88	+15
2023 (Argentina)	final	2nd place	5	4	0	1	175	86	+89
Total	2/2	0 Titles	9	7	0	2	278	174	+104
