= Ester Somaza =

Spanish handball player (born 2004)

Personal information
- Full name: Ester Somaza Bosch
- Nationality: Spanish
- Born: 3 June 2004 (age 22) Les Franqueses del Valles, Spain
- Height: 1.77 m (5 ft 10 in)

Sport
- Sport: Handball
- Position: Left Back
- Current club: Super Amara Bera Bera
- Number: 16

Senior clubs
- Years: Team
- –2022: Mubak BM La Roca
- 2022–2025: KH-7 BM Granollers
- 2025–: Super Amara Bera Bera
National team
Years	Team	Apps	(Gls)
2022–	Spain	34	(61)
- Updated on 5 July 2026

Ester Somaza Bosch (born 3 June 2004) is a Spanish handball player who serves as the left wing for Super Amara Bera Bera in the Liga Guerreras Iberdrola. She also represents Spain internationally as part of the women's national handball team.

== Professional career ==
Somaza began her handball development in the youth system of Fundació Handbol Roquerol. She later played in Spain’s División de Honor Plata with Mubak Balonmano La Roca, a team based in La Roca del Vallés. The move proved to be a stepping stone, as she was swiftly snapped up by the prestigious KH-7 Bm Granollers for the Spanish División de Honor in the subsequent season.

In the 2021–22 season with Mubak Bm La Roca, she notched up a tally of 28 matches, bagging a remarkable 94 goals. Her move to Club Balonmano Granollers for the 2022–23 season has seen her continue this stellar form, with 10 matches played and 52 goals scored in domestic competition.

=== Spain women's national team ===
Somaza made her debut with the Spanish national team at the age of 18 during the Torneo Internacional de Batalha. She was called up to the national squad under head coach José Ignacio Prades.

Under the guidance of Ambros Martín, she secured a coveted spot in the squad for the 2023 World Championship, marking her inaugural appearance in a major international tournament with the Guerreras.

== Individual Awards and recognitions ==
- Gold Medal in 2022 Women's Junior European Handball Championship B (2023)
