= Handball at the 2010 Summer Youth Olympics =

Tournament details
- Host country: Singapore
- Venue: 1 (in 1 host city)
- Dates: 20 – 25 August 2010
- Teams: 12 (from 5 confederations)

Final positions
- Champions: Egypt (boys); Denmark (girls)
- Runners-up: South Korea (boys); Russia (girls)
- Third place: France (boys); Brazil (girls)

Handball at the 2010 Summer Youth Olympics took place at the Suntec Singapore International Convention and Exhibition Centre in Singapore.

== Medal summary ==
Event	Gold	Silver	Bronze
Boys'	Egypt	South Korea	France
Girls'	Denmark	Russia	Brazil

== Participating teams ==
=== Boys ===
Group A

- Brazil
- Egypt
- Singapore

Group B

- Cook Islands
- France
- South Korea

=== Girls ===
Group A

- Angola
- Brazil
- Russia

Group B

- Australia
- Denmark
- Kazakhstan
