= Uruguay women's national youth handball team =

Uruguay

Information
- Association: Federacion Uruguaya de Handball
- Coach: Geronimo Goyoaga

Colours
1st	2nd

Results

IHF U-18 World Championship
- Appearances: 4 (First in 2010)
- Best result: 12th (2010)
- Last updated on Unknown.

The Uruguay women's youth national handball team is the national under-17 handball team of Uruguay. Controlled by the Federacion Uruguaya de Handball it represents the country in international matches.

== World Championship record ==
- 2010 – 12th place
- 2012 – 17th place
- 2022 – 31st place
- 2026 – 29th place
