= Handball at the 2014 Summer Youth Olympics =

Tournament details
- Host country: China
- Venue: 1 (in 1 host city)
- Dates: 20–25 August
- Teams: 12 (from 4 confederations)

Handball at the 2014 Summer Youth Olympics was held from 20 to 25 August at the Jiangning Sports Center in Nanjing, China.

== Qualification ==
A total of 6 teams will participate in each gender. Each National Olympic Committee (NOC) can enter a maximum of 2 teams of 14 athletes, 1 per each gender. As hosts, China is given the choice of entering a male or female team while the other places shall be decided by qualification events, namely five continental qualification tournaments.

China chose to enter a girls' team therefore the unoccupied boys' team was reallocated to the best placed continent at the 2013 Men's Youth World Handball Championship (Europe). Furthermore Oceania did not organize a qualifying event for either gender thus the spots were reallocated.

To be eligible to participate at the Youth Olympics athletes must have been born between 1 January 1996 and 31 December 1998. Furthermore, all qualified NOCs must either have a senior ranking in the top 40 on 1 January 2014 or finish ahead of a team ranked in the top 20 during the continental qualification tournament.

=== Boys ===
Event	Location	Date	Total Places	Qualified	Group
Host Nation	-	-	0	~~China~~	
2013 European Youth Olympic Festival	(Netherlands) Utrecht	14–19 July 2013	2	Slovenia	B
2013 European Youth Olympic Festival	(Netherlands) Utrecht	14–19 July 2013	2	Norway	A
2013 Asian Youth Games	(China) Nanjing	16–24 August 2013	1	Qatar	B
2014 African Youth Nations Championship	(Kenya) Nairobi	15–21 March 2014	2	Egypt	A
2014 African Youth Nations Championship	(Kenya) Nairobi	15–21 March 2014	2	Tunisia	B
2014 Pan American Youth Championship	(Argentina) Buenos Aires	1–5 April 2014	1	Brazil	A
Oceania Qualification Event	-	Cancelled	0		
TOTAL			6		

=== Girls ===
Event	Location	Date	Total Places	Qualified	Group
Host Nation	-	-	1	China	B
2013 European Youth Championship	(Poland) Gdańsk/Gdynia	15–25 August 2013	2	Sweden	B
2013 European Youth Championship	(Poland) Gdańsk/Gdynia	15–25 August 2013	2	Russia	A
2013 Asian Youth Games	(China) Nanjing	16–24 August 2013	1	South Korea	A
2013 African Youth Nations Championship	(Republic of the Congo) Oyo	22–31 August 2013	1	Angola	A
2014 Pan American Youth Championship	(Brazil) Fortaleza	20–28 April 2014	1	Brazil	B
Oceania Qualification Event	-	Cancelled	0		
TOTAL			6		

== Schedule ==
The schedule was released by the Nanjing Youth Olympic Games Organizing Committee.

All times are CST (UTC+8)

Event date	Event day	Starting time	Event details
August 20	Wednesday	14:00; 16:00	Girls' Group Stage
August 20	Wednesday	18:00; 20:00	Boys' Group Stage
August 21	Thursday	14:00; 16:00	Girls' Group Stage
August 21	Thursday	18:00; 20:00	Boys' Group Stage
August 22	Friday	14:00; 16:00	Girls' Group Stage
August 22	Friday	18:00; 20:00	Boys' Group Stage
August 24	Sunday	09:00	Girls' 5-6 Placement Match 1st Leg
August 24	Sunday	11:00	Boys' 5-6 Placement Match 1st Leg
August 24	Sunday	13:00; 15:30	Girls' Semifinals
August 24	Sunday	18:00; 20:30	Boys' Semifinals
August 25	Monday	09:00	Girls' 5-6 Placement Match 2nd Leg
August 25	Monday	11:00	Boys' 5-6 Placement Match 2nd Leg
August 25	Monday	13:00	Girls' Bronze Medal Match
August 25	Monday	15:30	Boys' Bronze Medal Match
August 25	Monday	18:00	Girls' Gold Medal Match
August 25	Monday	20:30	Boys' Gold Medal Match

== Medal summary ==
=== Medal table ===
Rank	Nation	Gold	Silver	Bronze	Total
1	Slovenia	1	0	0	1
1	South Korea	1	0	0	1
3	Egypt	0	1	0	1
3	Russia	0	1	0	1
5	Norway	0	0	1	1
5	Sweden	0	0	1	1
Totals (6 entries)		2	2	2	6

=== Events ===
Event	Gold	Silver	Bronze
Boys'	Slovenia	Egypt	Norway
Girls'	South Korea	Russia	Sweden
