= 2023 European Women's U-17 Handball Championship =

Tournament details
- Host country: Montenegro
- Venues: 2 (in 1 host city)
- Dates: 3–13 August
- Teams: 16 (from 1 confederation)

Final positions
- Champions: France (2nd title)
- Runners-up: Denmark
- Third place: Germany
- Fourth place: Croatia

Tournament statistics
- Matches played: 56
- Goals scored: 2,892 (51.64 per match)
- Attendance: 11,458 (205 per match)
- Top scorer(s): (Switzerland) Era Baumann (55 goals)

Awards
- Best player: (Denmark) Andrea Nørklit Jørgensen

The 2023 Women's U-17 European Handball Championship was the 16th edition of the European Women's U-17 Handball Championship, which was held in Podgorica, Montenegro from 3 to 13 August 2023.

== Host selection ==
- Montenegro

Montenegro won the hosting rights for the second successive time at an EHF meeting in Luxembourg on 23 September 2022.

== Qualification ==
After the 2022 Russian Invasion of Ukraine, the Russians were disqualified and Iceland, who placed second in the qualification tournament, took their place.

Competition	Dates	Host	Vacancies	Qualified
Host nation	23 September 2022	Luxembourg	1	Montenegro
Women's 17 EHF EURO 2021	5–15 August 2021	Montenegro	11	Hungary; Germany; Denmark; Croatia; Norway; Romania; Switzerland; Portugal; France; Sweden; Czech Republic
Women's 17 EHF Championship 2021	6–15 August 2021	(Georgia (country)) Tbilisi	1	Netherlands
Women's 17 EHF Championship 2021	7–15 August 2021	(Lithuania) Klaipėda	1	North Macedonia
Qualification tournament	22–25 November 2021`	(Serbia) Belgrade	1	Serbia; Iceland (Note: Replaced Russia after they were disqualified due to the war in Ukraine.)

== Venues ==
Both venues were in the capital, Podgorica.

Podgorica	Podgorica	2023 European Women's U-17 Handball Championship is located in Montenegro
Morača Sports Center; Capacity: 6,000	Verde Complex; Capacity: 2,100	2023 European Women's U-17 Handball Championship is located in Montenegro

== Draw ==
The draw was held on 28 February 2023 in Vienna.

Pot 1	Pot 2	Pot 3	Pot 4
Hungary; Germany; Denmark; Croatia	Norway; Montenegro (H); Romania; Switzerland	Portugal; France; Sweden; Czech Republic	North Macedonia; Netherlands; Serbia; Iceland

== Preliminary round ==
All times are local (UTC+2).

=== Group A ===
Pos	Team	Pld	W	D	L	GF	GA	GD	Pts	Qualification
1	Germany	3	2	1	0	83	66	+17	5	Main round
2	Montenegro (H)	3	1	1	1	80	62	+18	3	Main round
3	Czech Republic	3	1	0	2	84	83	+1	2 (Note: Czech Republic 28–22 Iceland)	Intermediate round
4	Iceland	3	1	0	2	60	96	−36	2	Intermediate round

Source: EHF
Rules for classification: 1) points; 2) head-to-head points; 3) head-to-head goal difference; 4) head-to-head number of goals scored; 5) goal difference.
(H) Hosts
Notes:

3 August 2023; 18:00	Montenegro	18–20	Iceland	Verde Complex, Podgorica; Attendance: 400; Referees: Weijmans, Wolbertus (NED)
3 August 2023; 18:00	Ramusović 5	(7–10)	Gunnþórsdóttir 6	Verde Complex, Podgorica; Attendance: 400; Referees: Weijmans, Wolbertus (NED)
3 August 2023; 18:00	4× (suspension)	Report	1× (yellow card) 5× (suspension)	Verde Complex, Podgorica; Attendance: 400; Referees: Weijmans, Wolbertus (NED)

3 August 2023; 20:15	Germany	39–29	Czech Republic	Verde Complex, Podgorica; Attendance: 200; Referees: Bojinovski, Nacevski (MKD)
3 August 2023; 20:15	Tucholke 8	(17–17)	Kočová, Pejšová 5	Verde Complex, Podgorica; Attendance: 200; Referees: Bojinovski, Nacevski (MKD)
3 August 2023; 20:15	4× (suspension)	Report	2× (suspension)	Verde Complex, Podgorica; Attendance: 200; Referees: Bojinovski, Nacevski (MKD)

4 August 2023; 18:00	Czech Republic	21–25	Montenegro	Verde Complex, Podgorica; Attendance: 350; Referees: Borge, Nygren (NOR)
4 August 2023; 18:00	Rampová 5	(10–12)	Ramusović 8	Verde Complex, Podgorica; Attendance: 350; Referees: Borge, Nygren (NOR)
4 August 2023; 18:00	3× (suspension)	Report	4× (suspension)	Verde Complex, Podgorica; Attendance: 350; Referees: Borge, Nygren (NOR)

4 August 2023; 20:15	Iceland	24–34	Germany	Verde Complex, Podgorica; Attendance: 300; Referees: Pukšić, Satler (SLO)
4 August 2023; 20:15	Gunnþórsdóttir 9	(12–16)	Tucholke 7	Verde Complex, Podgorica; Attendance: 300; Referees: Pukšić, Satler (SLO)
4 August 2023; 20:15	5× (suspension)	Report	7× (suspension)	Verde Complex, Podgorica; Attendance: 300; Referees: Pukšić, Satler (SLO)

6 August 2023; 18:00	Germany	23–23	Montenegro	Verde Complex, Podgorica; Attendance: 500; Referees: Cipov, Klus (SVK)
6 August 2023; 18:00	Tucholke 6	(12–10)	Mitrović 7	Verde Complex, Podgorica; Attendance: 500; Referees: Cipov, Klus (SVK)
6 August 2023; 18:00	6× (suspension)	Report	2× (suspension)	Verde Complex, Podgorica; Attendance: 500; Referees: Cipov, Klus (SVK)

6 August 2023; 20:15	Czech Republic	28–22	Iceland	Verde Complex, Podgorica; Attendance: 300; Referees: Pîrvu, Potîrniche (ROU)
6 August 2023; 20:15	Filípková 8	(16–7)	Pálsdóttir 6	Verde Complex, Podgorica; Attendance: 300; Referees: Pîrvu, Potîrniche (ROU)
6 August 2023; 20:15	5× (suspension) 1× (red card)	Report	1× (suspension)	Verde Complex, Podgorica; Attendance: 300; Referees: Pîrvu, Potîrniche (ROU)

=== Group B ===
Pos	Team	Pld	W	D	L	GF	GA	GD	Pts	Qualification
1	Croatia	3	3	0	0	91	65	+26	6	Main round
2	Serbia	3	1	0	2	69	73	−4	2 (Note: Serbia 2 Pts, +6 GD; Switzerland 2 Pts, +1 GD; Sweden 2 Pts, –7 GD)	Main round
3	Switzerland	3	1	0	2	72	79	−7	2	Intermediate round
4	Sweden	3	1	0	2	77	92	−15	2	Intermediate round

Source: EHF
Rules for classification: 1) points; 2) head-to-head points; 3) head-to-head goal difference; 4) head-to-head number of goals scored; 5) goal difference.
Notes:

3 August 2023; 13:00	Croatia	34–26	Sweden	Verde Complex, Podgorica; Attendance: 100; Referees: Fotakidis, Kinatzidis (GRE)
3 August 2023; 13:00	Renić 8	(15–16)	Lundvall 6	Verde Complex, Podgorica; Attendance: 100; Referees: Fotakidis, Kinatzidis (GRE)
3 August 2023; 13:00	3× (suspension)	Report	4× (suspension)	Verde Complex, Podgorica; Attendance: 100; Referees: Fotakidis, Kinatzidis (GRE)

3 August 2023; 15:15	Switzerland	23–21	Serbia	Verde Complex, Podgorica; Attendance: 100; Referees: Borge, Nygren (NOR)
3 August 2023; 15:15	Baumann 8	(13–8)	Bulatović 5	Verde Complex, Podgorica; Attendance: 100; Referees: Borge, Nygren (NOR)
3 August 2023; 15:15	7× (suspension)	Report	8× (suspension)	Verde Complex, Podgorica; Attendance: 100; Referees: Borge, Nygren (NOR)

4 August 2023; 13:30	Serbia	20–30	Croatia	Verde Complex, Podgorica; Attendance: 100; Referees: Pîrvu, Potîrniche (ROU)
4 August 2023; 13:30	Radović 7	(8–13)	Renić 8	Verde Complex, Podgorica; Attendance: 100; Referees: Pîrvu, Potîrniche (ROU)
4 August 2023; 13:30	5× (suspension)	Report	7× (suspension) 1× (red card)	Verde Complex, Podgorica; Attendance: 100; Referees: Pîrvu, Potîrniche (ROU)

4 August 2023; 15:45	Sweden	31–30	Switzerland	Verde Complex, Podgorica; Attendance: 200; Referees: Bojinovski, Nacevski (MKD)
4 August 2023; 15:45	Jungqvist 7	(11–17)	Baumann 9	Verde Complex, Podgorica; Attendance: 200; Referees: Bojinovski, Nacevski (MKD)
4 August 2023; 15:45	2× (suspension)	Raport	2× (suspension)	Verde Complex, Podgorica; Attendance: 200; Referees: Bojinovski, Nacevski (MKD)

6 August 2023; 13:30	Sweden	20–28	Serbia	Verde Complex, Podgorica; Attendance: 200; Referees: Weijmans, Wolbertus (NED)
6 August 2023; 13:30	Jungqvist 5	(8–11)	Radović 7	Verde Complex, Podgorica; Attendance: 200; Referees: Weijmans, Wolbertus (NED)
6 August 2023; 13:30	1× (suspension)	Report	5× (suspension)	Verde Complex, Podgorica; Attendance: 200; Referees: Weijmans, Wolbertus (NED)

6 August 2023; 15:45	Croatia	27–19	Switzerland	Verde Complex, Podgorica; Attendance: 150; Referees: Borge, Nygren (NOR)
6 August 2023; 15:45	Ðelekovcan 7	(13–10)	Baumann 4	Verde Complex, Podgorica; Attendance: 150; Referees: Borge, Nygren (NOR)
6 August 2023; 15:45	6× (suspension)	Report	3× (suspension)	Verde Complex, Podgorica; Attendance: 150; Referees: Borge, Nygren (NOR)

=== Group C ===
Pos	Team	Pld	W	D	L	GF	GA	GD	Pts	Qualification
1	Denmark	3	3	0	0	75	62	+13	6	Main round
2	Netherlands	3	1	0	2	63	66	−3	2 (Note: Netherlands 2 Pts, +2 GD; Norway 2 Pts, +1 GD; Portugal 2 Pts, –3 GD)	Main round
3	Norway	3	1	0	2	72	75	−3	2	Intermediate round
4	Portugal	3	1	0	2	67	74	−7	2	Intermediate round

Source: EHF
Rules for classification: 1) points; 2) head-to-head points; 3) head-to-head goal difference; 4) head-to-head number of goals scored; 5) goal difference.
Notes:

3 August 2023; 18:00	Denmark	22–18	Portugal	Morača Sports Center, Podgorica; Attendance: 200; Referees: Pukšić, Satler (SLO)
3 August 2023; 18:00	Johansen 6	(11–8)	Moniz 5	Morača Sports Center, Podgorica; Attendance: 200; Referees: Pukšić, Satler (SLO)
3 August 2023; 18:00	2× (suspension)	Report	2× (yellow card) 6× (suspension)	Morača Sports Center, Podgorica; Attendance: 200; Referees: Pukšić, Satler (SLO)

3 August 2023; 20:15	Norway	18–21	Netherlands	Morača Sports Center, Podgorica; Attendance: 50; Referees: Cipov, Klus (SVK)
3 August 2023; 20:15	Ellingsen 4	(10–13)	Exterkate 4	Morača Sports Center, Podgorica; Attendance: 50; Referees: Cipov, Klus (SVK)
3 August 2023; 20:15	4× (suspension) 1× (red card)	Report	1× (yellow card) 1× (suspension)	Morača Sports Center, Podgorica; Attendance: 50; Referees: Cipov, Klus (SVK)

4 August 2023; 18:00	Netherlands	21–26	Denmark	Morača Sports Center, Podgorica; Attendance: 400; Referees: Bošnjak, Marić (BIH)
4 August 2023; 18:00	Schouten 6	(12–12)	Plougstrup 7	Morača Sports Center, Podgorica; Attendance: 400; Referees: Bošnjak, Marić (BIH)
4 August 2023; 18:00	1× (yellow card) 5× (suspension)	Report	6× (suspension)	Morača Sports Center, Podgorica; Attendance: 400; Referees: Bošnjak, Marić (BIH)

4 August 2023; 20:15	Portugal	27–31	Norway	Morača Sports Center, Podgorica; Attendance: 100; Referees: Fotakidis, Kinatzidis (GRE)
4 August 2023; 20:15	Moniz 9	(13–16)	Strand-Larsen 11	Morača Sports Center, Podgorica; Attendance: 100; Referees: Fotakidis, Kinatzidis (GRE)
4 August 2023; 20:15	4× (suspension)	Report	3× (suspension)	Morača Sports Center, Podgorica; Attendance: 100; Referees: Fotakidis, Kinatzidis (GRE)

6 August 2023; 13:30	Denmark	27–23	Norway	Morača Sports Center, Podgorica; Attendance: 70; Referees: Aylagas, Ruiz (ESP)
6 August 2023; 13:30	Plougstrup 9	(11–10)	Slenes 6	Morača Sports Center, Podgorica; Attendance: 70; Referees: Aylagas, Ruiz (ESP)
6 August 2023; 13:30	2× (suspension)	Report	1× (suspension)	Morača Sports Center, Podgorica; Attendance: 70; Referees: Aylagas, Ruiz (ESP)

6 August 2023; 15:45	Portugal	22–21	Netherlands	Morača Sports Center, Podgorica; Attendance: 150; Referees: Weber, Weinquin (LUX)
6 August 2023; 15:45	Silva 7	(9–14)	Boers, Horvers 4	Morača Sports Center, Podgorica; Attendance: 150; Referees: Weber, Weinquin (LUX)
6 August 2023; 15:45	7× (suspension)	Report	2× (suspension) 1× (red card)	Morača Sports Center, Podgorica; Attendance: 150; Referees: Weber, Weinquin (LUX)

=== Group D ===
Pos	Team	Pld	W	D	L	GF	GA	GD	Pts	Qualification
1	France	3	3	0	0	91	66	+25	6	Main round
2	Hungary	3	2	0	1	103	77	+26	4	Main round
3	Romania	3	1	0	2	90	83	+7	2	Intermediate round
4	North Macedonia	3	0	0	3	59	117	−58	0	Intermediate round

Source: EHF
Rules for classification: 1) points; 2) head-to-head points; 3) head-to-head goal difference; 4) head-to-head number of goals scored; 5) goal difference.

3 August 2023; 13:30	Hungary	28–33	France	Morača Sports Center, Podgorica; Attendance: 50; Referees: Bošnjak, Marić (BIH)
3 August 2023; 13:30	Fazekas 12	(17–12)	Injai 7	Morača Sports Center, Podgorica; Attendance: 50; Referees: Bošnjak, Marić (BIH)
3 August 2023; 13:30	6× (suspension)	Report	5× (suspension)	Morača Sports Center, Podgorica; Attendance: 50; Referees: Bošnjak, Marić (BIH)

3 August 2023; 15:45	Romania	40–27	North Macedonia	Morača Sports Center, Podgorica; Attendance: 50; Referees: Aylagas, Ruiz (ESP)
3 August 2023; 15:45	Damian, Rogoz 6	(23–15)	Mladenovska 9	Morača Sports Center, Podgorica; Attendance: 50; Referees: Aylagas, Ruiz (ESP)
3 August 2023; 15:45	7× (suspension) 1× (red card)	Report	4× (suspension)	Morača Sports Center, Podgorica; Attendance: 50; Referees: Aylagas, Ruiz (ESP)

4 August 2023; 13:30	North Macedonia	17–46	Hungary	Morača Sports Center, Podgorica; Attendance: 100; Referees: Weber, Weinquin (LUX)
4 August 2023; 13:30	Milenkoska 5	(6–23)	Himer, Varga 7	Morača Sports Center, Podgorica; Attendance: 100; Referees: Weber, Weinquin (LUX)
4 August 2023; 13:30	7× (suspension)	Report	4× (suspension)	Morača Sports Center, Podgorica; Attendance: 100; Referees: Weber, Weinquin (LUX)

4 August 2023; 15:45	France	27–23	Romania	Morača Sports Center, Podgorica; Attendance: 200; Referees: Cipov, Klus (SVK)
4 August 2023; 15:45	Chantelly 8	(15–16)	Gavrilă 6	Morača Sports Center, Podgorica; Attendance: 200; Referees: Cipov, Klus (SVK)
4 August 2023; 15:45	4× (suspension)	Report	6× (suspension)	Morača Sports Center, Podgorica; Attendance: 200; Referees: Cipov, Klus (SVK)

6 August 2023; 18:00	Hungary	29–27	Romania	Morača Sports Center, Podgorica; Attendance: 500; Referees: Fotakidis, Kinatzidis (GRE)
6 August 2023; 18:00	Fazekas, Keceli-Mészáros 8	(10–15)	Damian 7	Morača Sports Center, Podgorica; Attendance: 500; Referees: Fotakidis, Kinatzidis (GRE)
6 August 2023; 18:00	3× (suspension)	Report	6× (suspension)	Morača Sports Center, Podgorica; Attendance: 500; Referees: Fotakidis, Kinatzidis (GRE)

6 August 2023; 20:15	France	31–15	North Macedonia	Morača Sports Center, Podgorica; Attendance: 200; Referees: Pukšić, Satler (SLO)
6 August 2023; 20:15	Andon, Gros 5	(15–4)	Trpeska 4	Morača Sports Center, Podgorica; Attendance: 200; Referees: Pukšić, Satler (SLO)
6 August 2023; 20:15	3× (suspension)	Report	4× (suspension)	Morača Sports Center, Podgorica; Attendance: 200; Referees: Pukšić, Satler (SLO)

== Intermediate round ==
The intermediate groups were numbered III and IV. The teams that qualified for this phase retained their points and goal difference obtained in games played against the teams from the same preliminary group.

=== Group III ===
Pos	Team	Pld	W	D	L	GF	GA	GD	Pts	Qualification
1	Czech Republic	3	3	0	0	89	76	+13	6	9–12th place semifinals
2	Sweden	3	2	0	1	92	83	+9	4	9–12th place semifinals
3	Switzerland	3	1	0	2	82	83	−1	2	13–16th place semifinals
4	Iceland	3	0	0	3	66	87	−21	0	13–16th place semifinals

Source: EHF
Rules for classification: 1) points; 2) head-to-head points; 3) head-to-head goal difference; 4) head-to-head number of goals scored; 5) goal difference.

8 August 2023; 13:30	Sweden	27–30	Czech Republic	Verde Complex, Podgorica; Attendance: 160; Referees: Aylagas, Ruiz (ESP)
8 August 2023; 13:30	Huselius 5	(14–16)	Filípková 13	Verde Complex, Podgorica; Attendance: 160; Referees: Aylagas, Ruiz (ESP)
8 August 2023; 13:30	2× (suspension)	Report	4× (suspension)	Verde Complex, Podgorica; Attendance: 160; Referees: Aylagas, Ruiz (ESP)

8 August 2023; 15:45	Switzerland	25–21	Iceland	Verde Complex, Podgorica; Attendance: 150; Referees: Weber, Weinquin (LUX)
8 August 2023; 15:45	Brunett 6	(13–12)	Pálsdóttir, Þórhallsdóttir 5	Verde Complex, Podgorica; Attendance: 150; Referees: Weber, Weinquin (LUX)
8 August 2023; 15:45	7× (suspension)	Report	1× (yellow card) 5× (suspension)	Verde Complex, Podgorica; Attendance: 150; Referees: Weber, Weinquin (LUX)

9 August 2023; 13:30	Iceland	23–34	Sweden	Verde Complex, Podgorica; Attendance: 100; Referees: Bošnjak, Marić (BIH)
9 August 2023; 13:30	Ágústsdóttir, Jónasdóttir 5	(14–15)	Lundvall 13	Verde Complex, Podgorica; Attendance: 100; Referees: Bošnjak, Marić (BIH)
9 August 2023; 13:30	1× (yellow card) 6× (suspension) 1× (red card)	Report	1× (suspension)	Verde Complex, Podgorica; Attendance: 100; Referees: Bošnjak, Marić (BIH)

9 August 2023; 15:45	Czech Republic	31–27	Switzerland	Verde Complex, Podgorica; Attendance: 100; Referees: Bojinovski, Nacevski (MKD)
9 August 2023; 15:45	Filípková, Pejšová 7	(15–12)	Baumann 9	Verde Complex, Podgorica; Attendance: 100; Referees: Bojinovski, Nacevski (MKD)
9 August 2023; 15:45	4× (suspension)	Report	4× (suspension)	Verde Complex, Podgorica; Attendance: 100; Referees: Bojinovski, Nacevski (MKD)

=== Group IV ===
Pos	Team	Pld	W	D	L	GF	GA	GD	Pts	Qualification
1	Romania	3	3	0	0	104	78	+26	6	9–12th place semifinals
2	Norway	3	2	0	1	90	81	+9	4	9–12th place semifinals
3	Portugal	3	1	0	2	87	75	+12	2	13–16th place semifinals
4	North Macedonia	3	0	0	3	61	108	−47	0	13–16th place semifinals

Source: EHF
Rules for classification: 1) points; 2) head-to-head points; 3) head-to-head goal difference; 4) head-to-head number of goals scored; 5) goal difference.

8 August 2023; 13:30	North Macedonia	21–32	Norway	Morača Sports Center, Podgorica; Attendance: 200; Referees: Weijmans, Wolbertus (NED)
8 August 2023; 13:30	Mladenovska 7	(11–15)	Gulbrandsen 7	Morača Sports Center, Podgorica; Attendance: 200; Referees: Weijmans, Wolbertus (NED)
8 August 2023; 13:30	1× (yellow card) 5× (suspension)	Report	2× (suspension)	Morača Sports Center, Podgorica; Attendance: 200; Referees: Weijmans, Wolbertus (NED)

8 August 2023; 15:45	Romania	31–24	Portugal	Morača Sports Center, Podgorica; Attendance: 100; Referees: Bošnjak, Marić (BIH)
8 August 2023; 15:45	Damian 7	(11–9)	Pinheiro 7	Morača Sports Center, Podgorica; Attendance: 100; Referees: Bošnjak, Marić (BIH)
8 August 2023; 15:45	5× (suspension)	Report	7× (suspension) 1× (red card)	Morača Sports Center, Podgorica; Attendance: 100; Referees: Bošnjak, Marić (BIH)

9 August 2023; 13:30	Portugal	36–13	North Macedonia	Morača Sports Center, Podgorica; Attendance: 50; Referees: Weber, Weinquin (LUX)
9 August 2023; 13:30	Moniz 6	(14–8)	Kraleva, Mladenovska 3	Morača Sports Center, Podgorica; Attendance: 50; Referees: Weber, Weinquin (LUX)
9 August 2023; 13:30	4× (suspension)	Report	3× (suspension)	Morača Sports Center, Podgorica; Attendance: 50; Referees: Weber, Weinquin (LUX)

9 August 2023; 15:45	Norway	27–33	Romania	Morača Sports Center, Podgorica; Attendance: 200; Referees: Pukšić, Satler (SLO)
9 August 2023; 15:45	Kvia 8	(13–15)	Bodijar 7	Morača Sports Center, Podgorica; Attendance: 200; Referees: Pukšić, Satler (SLO)
9 August 2023; 15:45	5× (suspension)	Report	5× (suspension)	Morača Sports Center, Podgorica; Attendance: 200; Referees: Pukšić, Satler (SLO)

== Main round ==
The main groups were numbered I and II. The teams that qualified for this phase retained their points and goal difference in the games played against teams from the same preliminary group.

=== Group I ===
Pos	Team	Pld	W	D	L	GF	GA	GD	Pts	Qualification
1	Germany	3	2	1	0	84	63	+21	5	Semifinals
2	Croatia	3	2	0	1	79	72	+7	4	Semifinals
3	Serbia	3	1	0	2	59	83	−24	2	5–8th place semifinals
4	Montenegro (H)	3	0	1	2	67	71	−4	1	5–8th place semifinals

Source: EHF
Rules for classification: 1) points; 2) head-to-head points; 3) head-to-head goal difference; 4) head-to-head number of goals scored; 5) goal difference.
(H) Hosts

8 August 2023; 18:00	Croatia	27–25	Montenegro	Verde Complex, Podgorica; Attendance: 500; Referees: Fotakidis, Kinatzidis (GRE)
8 August 2023; 18:00	Vuković 8	(16–13)	Ramusović 6	Verde Complex, Podgorica; Attendance: 500; Referees: Fotakidis, Kinatzidis (GRE)
8 August 2023; 18:00	1× (suspension)	Report	3× (suspension)	Verde Complex, Podgorica; Attendance: 500; Referees: Fotakidis, Kinatzidis (GRE)

8 August 2023; 20:15	Serbia	18–34	Germany	Verde Complex, Podgorica; Attendance: 230; Referees: Borge, Nygren (NOR)
8 August 2023; 20:15	Radović 6	(12–17)	Litvinov 11	Verde Complex, Podgorica; Attendance: 230; Referees: Borge, Nygren (NOR)
8 August 2023; 20:15	5× (suspension)	Report	4× (suspension)	Verde Complex, Podgorica; Attendance: 230; Referees: Borge, Nygren (NOR)

9 August 2023; 18:00	Montenegro	19–21	Serbia	Verde Complex, Podgorica; Attendance: 400; Referees: Pîrvu, Potîrniche (ROU)
9 August 2023; 18:00	Jolić, Mitrović 4	(9–8)	Petrić 6	Verde Complex, Podgorica; Attendance: 400; Referees: Pîrvu, Potîrniche (ROU)
9 August 2023; 18:00	3× (suspension)	Report	1× (yellow card) 4× (suspension)	Verde Complex, Podgorica; Attendance: 400; Referees: Pîrvu, Potîrniche (ROU)

9 August 2023; 20:15	Germany	27–22	Croatia	Verde Complex, Podgorica; Attendance: 100; Referees: Weijmans, Wolbertus (NED)
9 August 2023; 20:15	Ott 6	(16–13)	Čičak 5	Verde Complex, Podgorica; Attendance: 100; Referees: Weijmans, Wolbertus (NED)
9 August 2023; 20:15	1× (suspension)	Report	1× (suspension)	Verde Complex, Podgorica; Attendance: 100; Referees: Weijmans, Wolbertus (NED)

=== Group II ===
Pos	Team	Pld	W	D	L	GF	GA	GD	Pts	Qualification
1	Denmark	3	2	1	0	75	65	+10	5	Semifinals
2	France	3	2	0	1	85	71	+14	4	Semifinals
3	Hungary	3	1	1	1	86	79	+7	3	5–8th place semifinals
4	Netherlands	3	0	0	3	61	92	−31	0	5–8th place semifinals

Source: EHF
Rules for classification: 1) points; 2) head-to-head points; 3) head-to-head goal difference; 4) head-to-head number of goals scored; 5) goal difference.

8 August 2023; 18:00	Hungary	24–24	Denmark	Morača Sports Center, Podgorica; Attendance: 300; Referees: Bojinovski, Nacevski (MKD)
8 August 2023; 18:00	Balogh, Bristyán, Szár 4	(10–9)	Plougstrup 8	Morača Sports Center, Podgorica; Attendance: 300; Referees: Bojinovski, Nacevski (MKD)
8 August 2023; 18:00	2× (suspension)	Report	1× (yellow card) 1× (suspension) 1× (red card)	Morača Sports Center, Podgorica; Attendance: 300; Referees: Bojinovski, Nacevski (MKD)

8 August 2023; 20:15	France	32–18	Netherlands	Morača Sports Center, Podgorica; Attendance: 100; Referees: Pîrvu, Potîrniche (ROU)
8 August 2023; 20:15	Senant 5	(17–8)	Horvers, Legebeke 5	Morača Sports Center, Podgorica; Attendance: 100; Referees: Pîrvu, Potîrniche (ROU)
8 August 2023; 20:15	1× (yellow card) 2× (suspension)	Report	1× (suspension)	Morača Sports Center, Podgorica; Attendance: 100; Referees: Pîrvu, Potîrniche (ROU)

9 August 2023; 18:00	Netherlands	22–34	Hungary	Morača Sports Center, Podgorica; Attendance: 100; Referees: Aylagas, Ruiz (ESP)
9 August 2023; 18:00	Dekker 6	(9–17)	Fazekas 7	Morača Sports Center, Podgorica; Attendance: 100; Referees: Aylagas, Ruiz (ESP)
9 August 2023; 18:00	1× (yellow card) 3× (suspension)	Report	2× (suspension)	Morača Sports Center, Podgorica; Attendance: 100; Referees: Aylagas, Ruiz (ESP)

9 August 2023; 20:15	Denmark	25–20	France	Morača Sports Center, Podgorica; Attendance: 300; Referees: Cipov, Klus (SVK)
9 August 2023; 20:15	Hattesen 8	(8–10)	Abdou 5	Morača Sports Center, Podgorica; Attendance: 300; Referees: Cipov, Klus (SVK)
9 August 2023; 20:15	4× (suspension) 1× (red card)	Report	1× (yellow card) 5× (suspension)	Morača Sports Center, Podgorica; Attendance: 300; Referees: Cipov, Klus (SVK)

== Final round ==
=== Bracket ===
Championship bracket

Semifinals
11 August 2023
Germany	21
France	26
11 August 2023
Denmark	21
Croatia	20

Final
13 August 2023
France	24
Denmark	19
Third place
13 August 2023
Germany	31
Croatia	27

Ninth place bracket

9–12th place semifinals
11 August 2023
Czech Republic	21
Norway	32
11 August 2023
Romania	23
Sweden	29

Ninth place
12 August 2023
Norway	30
Sweden	35
Eleventh place
12 August 2023
Czech Republic	25
Romania	33

Fifth place bracket

5–8th place semifinals
11 August 2023
Serbia	24
Netherlands	23
11 August 2023
Hungary	27
Montenegro	24

Fifth place
13 August 2023
Serbia	25
Hungary	28
Seventh place
13 August 2023
Netherlands	17
Montenegro	25

13th place bracket

13–16th place semifinals
11 August 2023
Switzerland	32
North Macedonia	31
11 August 2023
Portugal	28
Iceland	22

13th place
12 August 2023
Switzerland	25
Portugal	23
15th place
12 August 2023
North Macedonia	25
Iceland	34

=== 13–16th place semifinals ===
11 August 2023; 18:00	Switzerland	32–31	North Macedonia	Morača Sports Center, Podgorica; Attendance: 100; Referees: Borge, Nygren (NOR)
11 August 2023; 18:00	Baumann 11	(15–14)	Mladenovska 9	Morača Sports Center, Podgorica; Attendance: 100; Referees: Borge, Nygren (NOR)
11 August 2023; 18:00	3× (suspension)	Report	7× (suspension)	Morača Sports Center, Podgorica; Attendance: 100; Referees: Borge, Nygren (NOR)

11 August 2023; 18:00	Portugal	28–22	Iceland	Morača Sports Center, Podgorica; Attendance: 200; Referees: Weijmans, Wolbertus (NED)
11 August 2023; 18:00	Pinheiro, Pinto, Silva 6	(14–14)	Pálsdóttir 6	Morača Sports Center, Podgorica; Attendance: 200; Referees: Weijmans, Wolbertus (NED)
11 August 2023; 18:00	1× (yellow card) 3× (suspension)	Report	1× (yellow card) 3× (suspension)	Morača Sports Center, Podgorica; Attendance: 200; Referees: Weijmans, Wolbertus (NED)

=== 9–12th place semifinals ===
11 August 2023; 18:00	Czech Republic	21–32	Norway	Morača Sports Center, Podgorica; Attendance: 150; Referees: Bošnjak, Marić (BIH)
11 August 2023; 18:00	Pazderová 5	(9–15)	Helland 6	Morača Sports Center, Podgorica; Attendance: 150; Referees: Bošnjak, Marić (BIH)
11 August 2023; 18:00	1× (yellow card) 4× (suspension)	Report	6× (suspension)	Morača Sports Center, Podgorica; Attendance: 150; Referees: Bošnjak, Marić (BIH)

11 August 2023; 20:15	Romania	23–29	Sweden	Morača Sports Center, Podgorica; Attendance: 150; Referees: Weber, Weinquin (LUX)
11 August 2023; 20:15	Tulea 6	(13–12)	Lundvall 7	Morača Sports Center, Podgorica; Attendance: 150; Referees: Weber, Weinquin (LUX)
11 August 2023; 20:15	6× (suspension)	Report	5× (suspension)	Morača Sports Center, Podgorica; Attendance: 150; Referees: Weber, Weinquin (LUX)

=== 5–8th place semifinals ===
11 August 2023; 13:30	Serbia	24–23	Netherlands	Verde Complex, Podgorica; Attendance: 100; Referees: Fotakidis, Kinatzidis (GRE)
11 August 2023; 13:30	Bulatović 5	(18–11)	Exterkate 7	Verde Complex, Podgorica; Attendance: 100; Referees: Fotakidis, Kinatzidis (GRE)
11 August 2023; 13:30	4× (suspension)	Report	5× (suspension)	Verde Complex, Podgorica; Attendance: 100; Referees: Fotakidis, Kinatzidis (GRE)

11 August 2023; 15:45	Hungary	27–24	Montenegro	Verde Complex, Podgorica; Attendance: 300; Referees: Pukšić, Satler (SLO)
11 August 2023; 15:45	Keceli-Mészáros 7	(11–12)	Guberinić 6	Verde Complex, Podgorica; Attendance: 300; Referees: Pukšić, Satler (SLO)
11 August 2023; 15:45	2× (suspension)	Report	3× (suspension)	Verde Complex, Podgorica; Attendance: 300; Referees: Pukšić, Satler (SLO)

=== Semifinals ===
11 August 2023; 18:00	Germany	21–26	France	Verde Complex, Podgorica; Attendance: 400; Referees: Bojinovski, Nacevski (MKD)
11 August 2023; 18:00	Litvinov 5	(14–15)	Kingue 5	Verde Complex, Podgorica; Attendance: 400; Referees: Bojinovski, Nacevski (MKD)
11 August 2023; 18:00	1× (yellow card) 2× (suspension)	Report	1× (suspension)	Verde Complex, Podgorica; Attendance: 400; Referees: Bojinovski, Nacevski (MKD)

11 August 2023; 20:15	Denmark	21–20	Croatia	Verde Complex, Podgorica; Attendance: 500; Referees: Aylagas, Ruiz (ESP)
11 August 2023; 20:15	Hattesen, Jensen 4	(14–12)	Ðelekovcan, Fratnik 5	Verde Complex, Podgorica; Attendance: 500; Referees: Aylagas, Ruiz (ESP)
11 August 2023; 20:15	1× (suspension)	Report	4× (suspension)	Verde Complex, Podgorica; Attendance: 500; Referees: Aylagas, Ruiz (ESP)

=== 15th place game ===
12 August 2023; 11:15	North Macedonia	25–34	Iceland	Morača Sports Center, Podgorica; Attendance: 48; Referees: Pukšić, Satler (SLO)
12 August 2023; 11:15	Mladenovska 6	(12–14)	Eiríksdóttir 6	Morača Sports Center, Podgorica; Attendance: 48; Referees: Pukšić, Satler (SLO)
12 August 2023; 11:15	1× (yellow card) 6× (suspension)	Report	8× (suspension) 1× (red card)	Morača Sports Center, Podgorica; Attendance: 48; Referees: Pukšić, Satler (SLO)

=== 13th place game ===
12 August 2023; 13:30	Switzerland	25–23	Portugal	Morača Sports Center, Podgorica; Attendance: 100; Referees: Bošnjak, Marić (BIH)
12 August 2023; 13:30	Baumann 9	(8–10)	Silva 7	Morača Sports Center, Podgorica; Attendance: 100; Referees: Bošnjak, Marić (BIH)
12 August 2023; 13:30	6× (suspension)	Report	2× (yellow card) 8× (suspension)	Morača Sports Center, Podgorica; Attendance: 100; Referees: Bošnjak, Marić (BIH)

=== Eleventh place game ===
12 August 2023; 15:45	Czech Republic	25–33	Romania	Morača Sports Center, Podgorica; Attendance: 100; Referees: Fotakidis, Kinatzidis (GRE)
12 August 2023; 15:45	Rampová 6	(15–14)	Gavrilă 7	Morača Sports Center, Podgorica; Attendance: 100; Referees: Fotakidis, Kinatzidis (GRE)
12 August 2023; 15:45	6× (suspension)	Report	3× (suspension)	Morača Sports Center, Podgorica; Attendance: 100; Referees: Fotakidis, Kinatzidis (GRE)

=== Ninth place game ===
12 August 2023; 18:00	Norway	30–35	Sweden	Morača Sports Center, Podgorica; Attendance: 100; Referees: Aylagas, Ruiz (ESP)
12 August 2023; 18:00	Kvia, Lindquist 6	(13–15)	Rubin 7	Morača Sports Center, Podgorica; Attendance: 100; Referees: Aylagas, Ruiz (ESP)
12 August 2023; 18:00		Report		Morača Sports Center, Podgorica; Attendance: 100; Referees: Aylagas, Ruiz (ESP)

=== Seventh place game ===
13 August 2023; 11:15	Netherlands	17–25	Montenegro	Verde Complex, Podgorica; Attendance: 150; Referees: Borge, Nygren (NOR)
13 August 2023; 11:15	Exterkate 4	(8–12)	Mitrović 7	Verde Complex, Podgorica; Attendance: 150; Referees: Borge, Nygren (NOR)
13 August 2023; 11:15	2× (suspension)	Report	5× (suspension) 1× (red card)	Verde Complex, Podgorica; Attendance: 150; Referees: Borge, Nygren (NOR)

=== Fifth place game ===
13 August 2023; 13:30	Serbia	25–28	Hungary	Verde Complex, Podgorica; Attendance: 200; Referees: Weijmans, Wolbertus (NED)
13 August 2023; 13:30	Radović 9	(15–10)	Fazekas 10	Verde Complex, Podgorica; Attendance: 200; Referees: Weijmans, Wolbertus (NED)
13 August 2023; 13:30	1× (yellow card) 5× (suspension)	Report	1× (yellow card) 1× (suspension)	Verde Complex, Podgorica; Attendance: 200; Referees: Weijmans, Wolbertus (NED)

=== Third place game ===
13 August 2023; 15:45	Germany	31–27	Croatia	Verde Complex, Podgorica; Attendance: 300; Referees: Pîrvu, Potîrniche (ROU)
13 August 2023; 15:45	Ott 6	(17–13)	Čičak, Renić 6	Verde Complex, Podgorica; Attendance: 300; Referees: Pîrvu, Potîrniche (ROU)
13 August 2023; 15:45	1× (yellow card) 5× (suspension)	Report	5× (suspension)	Verde Complex, Podgorica; Attendance: 300; Referees: Pîrvu, Potîrniche (ROU)

=== Final ===
13 August 2023; 18:00	France	24–19	Denmark	Verde Complex, Podgorica; Attendance: 500; Referees: Cipov, Klus (SVK)
13 August 2023; 18:00	Abdou 4	(12–9)	Bugtrup 4	Verde Complex, Podgorica; Attendance: 500; Referees: Cipov, Klus (SVK)
13 August 2023; 18:00	1× (yellow card) 4× (suspension)	Report	2× (suspension)	Verde Complex, Podgorica; Attendance: 500; Referees: Cipov, Klus (SVK)

== Final ranking ==
There was no relegation as the event will be expanded from 2025 onwards to 24 teams.

Rank	Team
1st place, gold medalist(s)	France
2nd place, silver medalist(s)	Denmark
3rd place, bronze medalist(s)	Germany
4	Croatia
5	Hungary
6	Serbia
7	Montenegro
8	Netherlands
9	Sweden
10	Norway
11	Romania
12	Czech Republic
13	Switzerland
14	Portugal
15	Iceland (Note: Iceland qualified after being invited to replace the Oceanian representative.)
16	North Macedonia

Qualified for the 2024 Women's Youth World Handball Championship

== Tournament awards ==
The all-star team and awards were announced on 14 August 2023.

=== All-star team ===
Position	Player
Goalkeeper	(Serbia) Tatjana Činku
Right wing	(Croatia) Lucija Renić
Right back	(Hungary) Virág Fazekas
Centre back	(France) Mélissa Chantelly
Left back	(Denmark) Anne Dolberg Plougstrup
Left wing	(Germany) Alissa Katarina Wele
Pivot	(Montenegro) Anđela Guberinić

=== Awards ===
Most valuable player	(Denmark) Andrea Nørklit Jørgensen (GK)
Best defender	(Germany) Ruslana Litvinov

2023 U-17 European Champions

France
Second title

Team roster: Léane Gonzalez, Maëlle Landriau, Liyah Naal, Corentine Senant, Dawlya Abdou, Blandine Gros, Jone Arotçarena-Rosas, Eléa Ferdilus, Lalie Lambet, Prunelle Kingue, Julilove Andon, Mélissa Chantelly, Claire Koestner, Emma Bureu-Cruz, Zeina Injai, Élise Ollivier
Head coach: Olivier de Lafuente

== Top scorers ==
Top scorers are

#	Player	Team	Goals
1	Era Baumann	Switzerland	55
2	Virág Fazekas	Hungary	49
3	Tereza Filípková	Czech Republic	37
3	Iva Mladenovska	North Macedonia	37
3	Sara Radović	Serbia	37
6	Lydía Gunnþórsdóttir	Iceland	36
6	Ruslana Litvinov	Germany	36
8	Anne Dolberg Plougstrup	Denmark	35
9	Hanna Lundvall	Sweden	34
10	Ana Maria Gavrilă	Romania	33

== See also ==
- 2023 European Women's U-19 Handball Championship
