= Croatia women's national youth handball team =

Information
- Association: CHF
- Coach: Ivan Jerković

Colours
| 1st | 2nd |

Results

World Championship
- Appearances: 7
- Best result: 7th (2024)

European Championships
- Appearances: 8
- Best result: 2nd (2025)
- Last updated on 12 August 2025.

The Croatia women's national youth handball team (Croatian: Hrvatska ženska kadetska rukometna reprezentacija) is the U-17 women's national team of Croatia. It is governed by the Croatian Handball Federation (Hrvatski rukometni savez) and takes part in international handball competitions. Team's best results so far is silver medal at the 2025 European Championship, as well as 4th places at the European Championships in 2001 and 2023 and 7th place at the 2024 World Championship.

Team finished 4th at the 2023 Four Nations Tournament in Paris.

Team won bronze medal at the 2026 Open European Championship in Gothenburg, beating Swiss team in the bronze medal game (24-23), with Ema Gotal scoring 13 goals.

== Results ==
=== World Championship ===
- 2012 – 14th place
- 2014 – 10th place
- 2016 – 9th place
- 2018 – 12th place
- 2022 – 11th place
- 2024 – 7th place
- 2026 – 18th place

=== European Championship ===
- 2001 – 4th place
- 2011 – 9th place
- 2015 – 6th place
- 2017 – 13th place
- 2019 – 14th place
- 2021 – 5th place
- 2023 – 4th place
- 2025 – 2nd place

== Achievements ==
- Magdalena Ećimović: third most efficient goalkeeper of the 2014 World Championship
- Matea Pletikosić: best playmaker of the 2015 European Championship
- Katja Vuković: member of the all-star team of the 2021 European Championship
- Lucija Renić: best right wing of the 2023 European Championship (29 goals)
- Anđela Žagar: third best goalscorer at the 2022 World Championship (56 goals)
