= 2024 IHF Women's U18 Handball World Championship =

Tournament details
- Host country: China
- Venues: 3 (in 1 host city)
- Dates: 14–25 August
- Teams: 32 (from 5 confederations)

Final positions
- Champions: Spain (1st title)
- Runners-up: Denmark
- Third place: Hungary
- Fourth place: France

Tournament statistics
- Matches played: 116
- Goals scored: 5,730 (49.4 per match)
- Attendance: 59,122 (510 per match)
- Top scorers: (Hungary) Virág Fazekas (54 goals)

The 2024 IHF Women's U18 Handball World Championship was the tenth edition of the IHF Women's Youth World Championship. It was held in Chuzhou, China from 14 to 25 August 2024.

Spain won their first title with a finals win over Denmark.

== Bidding process ==
Originally, there were two bids, Slovenia and North Macedonia. But at the 2020 IHF Congress in Cairo, the International Handball Federation decided to not award the hosting rights due to Slovenia and North Macedonia already receiving other World Women's Under-Age Handball Competitions. The IHF received three bids.

- China
- Tunisia (withdrew)
- Turkey (withdrew)

On 12 August 2023, The IHF decided to award the hosting rights to China, with the goal of sparking the growth of Handball in the non-traditional Handball country. This is the first time an Asian country has organised this event and the first time since 2010 that the tournament will be held outside of Europe.

== Venues ==
The matches will be played in Chuzhou.

Chuzhou
International Handball Hall	Olympic Sports Center	Vocational and Technical College Stadium

== Qualification ==
Competition	Dates	Host	Vacancies	Qualified
IHF Council Meeting	12 August 2023	Croatia	1	China
2023 Asian Youth Championship	15–24 July 2023	(India) Noida	5	Chinese Taipei; India; Japan; Kazakhstan; South Korea
2023 European Women's U-17 Handball Championship	3–13 August 2023	(Montenegro) Podgorica	13	Croatia; Czech Republic; Denmark; France; Germany; Hungary; Montenegro; Netherlands; Norway; Romania; Serbia; Sweden; Switzerland
W17 EHF Championship 2023	5–13 August 2023	(Turkey) Çankaya	1	Austria
W17 EHF Championship 2023	5–13 August 2023	(Azerbaijan) Baku	1	Spain
2023 African Youth Championship	16–23 September 2023	(Tunisia) Monastir	4	Angola; Egypt; Guinea; Nigeria
2023 South and Central American Youth Championship	21–25 November 2023	(Argentina) Buenos Aires	3	Argentina; Brazil; Chile
2023 IHF Trophy U17 – North America and the Caribbean	2–6 December 2023	(Puerto Rico) Salinas	2	Canada; Greenland
2024 IHF Inter-Continental Trophy	28 February – 3 March 2024	(Uzbekistan) Tashkent	1	Kosovo
Invited			1	Iceland

== Draw ==
The draw was held on 13 April 2024 in Ulm, Germany.

=== Seeding ===
Pot 1	Pot 2	Pot 3	Pot 4
Japan; France; Denmark; Germany; Croatia; Hungary; Egypt; Serbia	Montenegro; Netherlands; Sweden; Norway; China; Romania; Czech Republic; Brazil	South Korea; Spain; Austria; Chinese Taipei; Argentina; India; Guinea; Nigeria	Kazakhstan; Chile; Angola; Switzerland; Canada; Greenland; Iceland; Kosovo

== Referees ==
The referees were announced on 14 May 2024.

Referees
Argentina	Santiago Correa; Agustín Conberse
Austria	Denis Bolic; Christoph Hurich
Brazil	Henrique Godoy; Daniel Magalhães
China	Cheng Yufeng; Zhou Yunlei
Denmark	Line Hansen; Josefine Jensen
Egypt	Mahmoud El-Beltagy; Hamdy Mahmoud
France	Titouan Picard; Pierre Vauchez
Hungary	Kristóf Altmár; Márton Horváth
Kuwait	Maali Al-Enezi; Dalal Al-Naseem
Morocco	Mohamed El Ghass; Zakaria El Malwane
North Macedonia	Ismailj Metalari; Nenad Nikolovski

Referees
Montenegro	Anđelina Kažanegra; Jelena Vujačić
Norway	Mads Fremstad; Jørgen Jørstad
Oman	Khamis Al-Wahibi; Omer Al-Shahi
Poland	Michał Fabryczny; Jakub Rawicki
Romania	Mihai Pîrvu; Mihai Potîrniche
Senegal	Fadel Diop; Abdoulaye Faye
Sweden	Alice Watson; Line Welin
Tunisia	Roua Haggui; Sahar Haggui
Ukraine	Maryna Duplii; Olena Pobedrina
Uruguay	Germán Araújo; Nicolás Perdomo
Uzbekistan	Khasan Ismoilov; Khusan Ismoilov

== Preliminary round ==
All times are local (UTC+8).

=== Group A ===
Pos	Team	Pld	W	D	L	GF	GA	GD	Pts	Qualification
1	Sweden	3	2	0	1	96	74	+22	4 (Note: Sweden 2 Pts, +2 GD; Serbia 2 Pts, +1 GD; Austra 2 Pts, −3 GD)	Main round
2	Serbia	3	2	0	1	86	79	+7	4	Main round
3	Austria	3	2	0	1	93	84	+9	4	Presidents Cup
4	Chile	3	0	0	3	64	102	−38	0	Presidents Cup

Source: IHF
Rules for classification: 1) points; 2) head-to-head points; 3) head-to-head goal difference; 4) head-to-head number of goals scored; 5) goal difference.
Notes:

14 August 2024; 10:00	Serbia	27–30	Austria	International Handball Hall, Chuzhou; Attendance: 300; Referees: Picard, Vauchez (FRA)
14 August 2024; 10:00	Stanić 8	(12–13)	Barnjak, Egbaimo 6	International Handball Hall, Chuzhou; Attendance: 300; Referees: Picard, Vauchez (FRA)
14 August 2024; 10:00	5× (suspension)	Report	5× (suspension)	International Handball Hall, Chuzhou; Attendance: 300; Referees: Picard, Vauchez (FRA)

14 August 2024; 12:00	Sweden	37–17	Chile	International Handball Hall, Chuzhou; Attendance: 300; Referees: Haggui, Haggui (TUN)
14 August 2024; 12:00	Huselius 7	(19–8)	three players 3	International Handball Hall, Chuzhou; Attendance: 300; Referees: Haggui, Haggui (TUN)
14 August 2024; 12:00	1× (yellow card) 4× (suspension)	Report	1× (suspension)	International Handball Hall, Chuzhou; Attendance: 300; Referees: Haggui, Haggui (TUN)

15 August 2024; 12:00	Chile	24–30	Serbia	International Handball Hall, Chuzhou; Attendance: 200; Referees: Al-Wahibi, Al-Shahi (OMA)
15 August 2024; 12:00	González 8	(9–11)	Radović 7	International Handball Hall, Chuzhou; Attendance: 200; Referees: Al-Wahibi, Al-Shahi (OMA)
15 August 2024; 12:00		Report		International Handball Hall, Chuzhou; Attendance: 200; Referees: Al-Wahibi, Al-Shahi (OMA)

15 August 2024; 14:00	Sweden	34–28	Austria	International Handball Hall, Chuzhou; Attendance: 550; Referees: Diop, Faye (SEN)
15 August 2024; 14:00	Rydén 8	(16–14)	Baljak 7	International Handball Hall, Chuzhou; Attendance: 550; Referees: Diop, Faye (SEN)
15 August 2024; 14:00		Report	2× (yellow card) 5× (suspension) 1× (red card)	International Handball Hall, Chuzhou; Attendance: 550; Referees: Diop, Faye (SEN)

17 August 2024; 10:00	Austria	35–23	Chile	International Handball Hall, Chuzhou; Attendance: 200; Referees: El Ghass, El Malwane (MAR)
17 August 2024; 10:00	Polanszky 6	(20–12)	three players 4	International Handball Hall, Chuzhou; Attendance: 200; Referees: El Ghass, El Malwane (MAR)
17 August 2024; 10:00	2× (yellow card) 2× (suspension)	Report	3× (suspension)	International Handball Hall, Chuzhou; Attendance: 200; Referees: El Ghass, El Malwane (MAR)

17 August 2024; 12:00	Serbia	29–25	Sweden	International Handball Hall, Chuzhou; Attendance: 260; Referees: Correa, Conberse (ARG)
17 August 2024; 12:00	Otašević 12	(13–11)	Johansson, Rydén 5	International Handball Hall, Chuzhou; Attendance: 260; Referees: Correa, Conberse (ARG)
17 August 2024; 12:00	1× (suspension)	Report	4× (suspension)	International Handball Hall, Chuzhou; Attendance: 260; Referees: Correa, Conberse (ARG)

=== Group B ===
Pos	Team	Pld	W	D	L	GF	GA	GD	Pts	Qualification
1	Croatia	3	2	1	0	79	43	+36	5 (Note: Croatia 18–18 Montenegro)	Main round
2	Montenegro	3	2	1	0	70	43	+27	5	Main round
3	Nigeria	3	1	0	2	49	78	−29	2	Presidents Cup
4	Angola	3	0	0	3	51	85	−34	0	Presidents Cup

Source: IHF
Rules for classification: 1) points; 2) head-to-head points; 3) head-to-head goal difference; 4) head-to-head number of goals scored; 5) goal difference.
Notes:

14 August 2024; 12:00	Croatia	31–11	Nigeria	International Handball Hall, Chuzhou; Attendance: 270; Referees: Hansen, Jensen (DEN)
14 August 2024; 12:00	Renić 9	(16–6)	Igbinedion 3	International Handball Hall, Chuzhou; Attendance: 270; Referees: Hansen, Jensen (DEN)
14 August 2024; 12:00	5× (suspension)	Report	9× (suspension)	International Handball Hall, Chuzhou; Attendance: 270; Referees: Hansen, Jensen (DEN)

14 August 2024; 14:00	Montenegro	26–16	Angola	International Handball Hall, Chuzhou; Attendance: 270; Referees: Correa, Converse (ARG)
14 August 2024; 14:00	Ramusović 7	(14–10)	Manuel, Nunda 3	International Handball Hall, Chuzhou; Attendance: 270; Referees: Correa, Converse (ARG)
14 August 2024; 14:00	5× (suspension)	Report	3× (suspension)	International Handball Hall, Chuzhou; Attendance: 270; Referees: Correa, Converse (ARG)

15 August 2024; 12:00	Angola	14–30	Croatia	International Handball Hall, Chuzhou; Attendance: 50; Referees: Pîrvu, Potîrniche (ROU)
15 August 2024; 12:00	Paulino 6	(4–19)	Vuković 8	International Handball Hall, Chuzhou; Attendance: 50; Referees: Pîrvu, Potîrniche (ROU)
15 August 2024; 12:00	2× (suspension) 1× (red card)	Report	1× (yellow card) 4× (suspension)	International Handball Hall, Chuzhou; Attendance: 50; Referees: Pîrvu, Potîrniche (ROU)

15 August 2024; 14:00	Montenegro	26–9	Nigeria	International Handball Hall, Chuzhou; Attendance: 150; Referees: El-Beltagy, Mahmoud (EGY)
15 August 2024; 14:00	Ćeklić 6	(13–6)	Babatunde 4	International Handball Hall, Chuzhou; Attendance: 150; Referees: El-Beltagy, Mahmoud (EGY)
15 August 2024; 14:00	3× (suspension)	Report	5× (suspension) 1× (red card)	International Handball Hall, Chuzhou; Attendance: 150; Referees: El-Beltagy, Mahmoud (EGY)

17 August 2024; 10:00	Nigeria	29–21	Angola	International Handball Hall, Chuzhou; Attendance: 100; Referees: Duplii, Pobedrina (UKR)
17 August 2024; 10:00	Ogbusimba 8	(11–9)	C. Domingos 7	International Handball Hall, Chuzhou; Attendance: 100; Referees: Duplii, Pobedrina (UKR)
17 August 2024; 10:00	5× (suspension)	Report	5× (suspension)	International Handball Hall, Chuzhou; Attendance: 100; Referees: Duplii, Pobedrina (UKR)

17 August 2024; 12:00	Croatia	18–18	Montenegro	International Handball Hall, Chuzhou; Attendance: 290; Referees: Picard, Vauchez (FRA)
17 August 2024; 12:00	Fratnik 7	(8–9)	Mitrović 5	International Handball Hall, Chuzhou; Attendance: 290; Referees: Picard, Vauchez (FRA)
17 August 2024; 12:00	6× (suspension)	Report	5× (suspension)	International Handball Hall, Chuzhou; Attendance: 290; Referees: Picard, Vauchez (FRA)

=== Group C ===
Pos	Team	Pld	W	D	L	GF	GA	GD	Pts	Qualification
1	Japan	3	2	1	0	109	64	+45	5	Main round
2	Netherlands	3	2	0	1	92	56	+36	4	Main round
3	South Korea	3	1	1	1	112	68	+44	3	Presidents Cup
4	Canada	3	0	0	3	33	158	−125	0	Presidents Cup

Source: IHF
Rules for classification: 1) points; 2) head-to-head points; 3) head-to-head goal difference; 4) head-to-head number of goals scored; 5) goal difference.

14 August 2024; 10:00	Japan	27–27	South Korea	Olympic Sports Center, Chuzhou; Attendance: 200; Referees: Cheng, Zhou (CHN)
14 August 2024; 10:00	Yasugahira 6	(12–14)	four players 5	Olympic Sports Center, Chuzhou; Attendance: 200; Referees: Cheng, Zhou (CHN)
14 August 2024; 10:00	3× (suspension)	Report	1× (yellow card) 3× (suspension)	Olympic Sports Center, Chuzhou; Attendance: 200; Referees: Cheng, Zhou (CHN)

14 August 2024; 12:00	Netherlands	41–6	Canada	Olympic Sports Center, Chuzhou; Attendance: 100; Referees: Watson, Welin (SWE)
14 August 2024; 12:00	Van Galen 8	(21–5)	Lemaire 3	Olympic Sports Center, Chuzhou; Attendance: 100; Referees: Watson, Welin (SWE)
14 August 2024; 12:00	1× (suspension)	Report	4× (suspension)	Olympic Sports Center, Chuzhou; Attendance: 100; Referees: Watson, Welin (SWE)

15 August 2024; 16:00	Netherlands	24–19	South Korea	Olympic Sports Center, Chuzhou; Attendance: 300; Referees: Ismoilov, Ismoilov (UZB)
15 August 2024; 16:00	Horvers 7	(10–13)	Ku, Lee Y. 4	Olympic Sports Center, Chuzhou; Attendance: 300; Referees: Ismoilov, Ismoilov (UZB)
15 August 2024; 16:00	3× (suspension)	Report	4× (suspension)	Olympic Sports Center, Chuzhou; Attendance: 300; Referees: Ismoilov, Ismoilov (UZB)

15 August 2024; 18:00	Canada	10–51	Japan	Olympic Sports Center, Chuzhou; Attendance: 500; Referees: Duplii, Pobedrina (UKR)
15 August 2024; 18:00	Boisclair 3	(3–21)	Yasugahira 9	Olympic Sports Center, Chuzhou; Attendance: 500; Referees: Duplii, Pobedrina (UKR)
15 August 2024; 18:00	3× (suspension)	Report	2× (suspension)	Olympic Sports Center, Chuzhou; Attendance: 500; Referees: Duplii, Pobedrina (UKR)

17 August 2024; 12:00	South Korea	66–17	Canada	Olympic Sports Center, Chuzhou; Attendance: 200; Referees: Fabryczny, Rawicki (POL)
17 August 2024; 12:00	Kim J. 11	(37–9)	Leclair 6	Olympic Sports Center, Chuzhou; Attendance: 200; Referees: Fabryczny, Rawicki (POL)
17 August 2024; 12:00	2× (yellow card) 5× (suspension) 1× (red card)	Report	1× (yellow card) 7× (suspension)	Olympic Sports Center, Chuzhou; Attendance: 200; Referees: Fabryczny, Rawicki (POL)

17 August 2024; 14:00	Japan	31–27	Netherlands	Olympic Sports Center, Chuzhou; Attendance: 200; Referees: Metalari, Nikolovski (MKD)
17 August 2024; 14:00	Nakao 6	(13–13)	Van Galen 8	Olympic Sports Center, Chuzhou; Attendance: 200; Referees: Metalari, Nikolovski (MKD)
17 August 2024; 14:00	1× (suspension)	Report	5× (suspension)	Olympic Sports Center, Chuzhou; Attendance: 200; Referees: Metalari, Nikolovski (MKD)

=== Group D ===
Pos	Team	Pld	W	D	L	GF	GA	GD	Pts	Qualification
1	France	3	3	0	0	128	48	+80	6	Main round
2	Brazil	3	2	0	1	91	72	+19	4	Main round
3	Kosovo	3	1	0	2	62	97	−35	2	Presidents Cup
4	India	3	0	0	3	45	109	−64	0	Presidents Cup

Source: IHF
Rules for classification: 1) points; 2) head-to-head points; 3) head-to-head goal difference; 4) head-to-head number of goals scored; 5) goal difference.

14 August 2024; 14:00	France	50–14	India	Olympic Sports Center, Chuzhou; Attendance: 100; Referees: Al-Shahi, Al-Wahibi (OMA)
14 August 2024; 14:00	Andon 8	(28–7)	Renuka 6	Olympic Sports Center, Chuzhou; Attendance: 100; Referees: Al-Shahi, Al-Wahibi (OMA)
14 August 2024; 14:00		Report	4× (suspension)	Olympic Sports Center, Chuzhou; Attendance: 100; Referees: Al-Shahi, Al-Wahibi (OMA)

14 August 2024; 16:00	Brazil	39–21	Kosovo	Vocational and Technical College Stadium, Chuzhou; Attendance: 300; Referees: Fremstad, Jørstad (NOR)
14 August 2024; 16:00	Ladeia 8	(19–11)	Imeraj 5	Vocational and Technical College Stadium, Chuzhou; Attendance: 300; Referees: Fremstad, Jørstad (NOR)
14 August 2024; 16:00	1× (yellow card) 3× (suspension)	Report	1× (yellow card) 6× (suspension)	Vocational and Technical College Stadium, Chuzhou; Attendance: 300; Referees: Fremstad, Jørstad (NOR)

15 August 2024; 16:00	Kosovo	16–44	France	International Handball Hall, Chuzhou; Attendance: 100; Referees: Cheng, Zhou (CHN)
15 August 2024; 16:00	Bibaj, Gjergjaj 4	(7–20)	Senant 6	International Handball Hall, Chuzhou; Attendance: 100; Referees: Cheng, Zhou (CHN)
15 August 2024; 16:00	1× (suspension)	Report	2× (suspension)	International Handball Hall, Chuzhou; Attendance: 100; Referees: Cheng, Zhou (CHN)

15 August 2024; 18:00	Brazil	34–17	India	International Handball Hall, Chuzhou; Attendance: 100; Referees: Metalari, Nikolovski (MKD)
15 August 2024; 18:00	Ladeia, Vitória 6	(14–11)	Sujata 9	International Handball Hall, Chuzhou; Attendance: 100; Referees: Metalari, Nikolovski (MKD)
15 August 2024; 18:00	3× (suspension)	Report	1× (yellow card) 4× (suspension)	International Handball Hall, Chuzhou; Attendance: 100; Referees: Metalari, Nikolovski (MKD)

17 August 2024; 14:00	France	34–18	Brazil	International Handball Hall, Chuzhou; Attendance: 300; Referees: Altmár, Horváth (HUN)
17 August 2024; 14:00	Abdou 6	(18–6)	Vitória 4	International Handball Hall, Chuzhou; Attendance: 300; Referees: Altmár, Horváth (HUN)
17 August 2024; 14:00	4× (suspension)	Report	1× (suspension) 1× (red card)	International Handball Hall, Chuzhou; Attendance: 300; Referees: Altmár, Horváth (HUN)

17 August 2024; 14:00	India	14–25	Kosovo	Vocational and Technical College Stadium, Chuzhou; Attendance: 350; Referees: El-Beltagy, Mahmoud (EGY)
17 August 2024; 14:00	three players 4	(6–15)	Dresh 7	Vocational and Technical College Stadium, Chuzhou; Attendance: 350; Referees: El-Beltagy, Mahmoud (EGY)
17 August 2024; 14:00	3× (suspension)	Report	3× (suspension)	Vocational and Technical College Stadium, Chuzhou; Attendance: 350; Referees: El-Beltagy, Mahmoud (EGY)

=== Group E ===
Pos	Team	Pld	W	D	L	GF	GA	GD	Pts	Qualification
1	Denmark	3	3	0	0	117	43	+74	6	Main round
2	China (H)	3	2	0	1	97	65	+32	4	Main round
3	Chinese Taipei	3	1	0	2	61	91	−30	2	Presidents Cup
4	Greenland	3	0	0	3	40	116	−76	0	Presidents Cup

Source: IHF
Rules for classification: 1) points; 2) head-to-head points; 3) head-to-head goal difference; 4) head-to-head number of goals scored; 5) goal difference.
(H) Hosts

14 August 2024; 18:30	China	46–17	Greenland	International Handball Hall, Chuzhou; Attendance: 2,000; Referees: Al-Enezi, Al-Naseem (KUW)
14 August 2024; 18:30	Xin, Yang Y. 5	(21–7)	Bjørnestad 8	International Handball Hall, Chuzhou; Attendance: 2,000; Referees: Al-Enezi, Al-Naseem (KUW)
14 August 2024; 18:30	4× (suspension)	Report		International Handball Hall, Chuzhou; Attendance: 2,000; Referees: Al-Enezi, Al-Naseem (KUW)

14 August 2024; 20:30	Denmark	47–13	Chinese Taipei	International Handball Hall, Chuzhou; Attendance: 350; Referees: El Ghass, El Malwane (MAR)
14 August 2024; 20:30	Jensen 11	(26–5)	Lin C. 3	International Handball Hall, Chuzhou; Attendance: 350; Referees: El Ghass, El Malwane (MAR)
14 August 2024; 20:30	3× (suspension)	Report	4× (suspension)	International Handball Hall, Chuzhou; Attendance: 350; Referees: El Ghass, El Malwane (MAR)

16 August 2024; 16:00	Greenland	8–42	Denmark	International Handball Hall, Chuzhou; Attendance: 300; Referees: Godoy, Magalhães (BRA)
16 August 2024; 16:00	Bjørnestad 4	(5–20)	Hoppe, Jensen 6	International Handball Hall, Chuzhou; Attendance: 300; Referees: Godoy, Magalhães (BRA)
16 August 2024; 16:00		Report	1× (suspension)	International Handball Hall, Chuzhou; Attendance: 300; Referees: Godoy, Magalhães (BRA)

16 August 2024; 18:00	China	29–20	Chinese Taipei	International Handball Hall, Chuzhou; Attendance: 1,000; Referees: Watson, Welin (SWE)
16 August 2024; 18:00	Pan 6	(12–8)	Lin C. 9	International Handball Hall, Chuzhou; Attendance: 1,000; Referees: Watson, Welin (SWE)
16 August 2024; 18:00	1× (suspension)	Report	1× (suspension)	International Handball Hall, Chuzhou; Attendance: 1,000; Referees: Watson, Welin (SWE)

17 August 2024; 18:00	Denmark	28–22	China	International Handball Hall, Chuzhou; Attendance: 5,050; Referees: Pîrvu, Potîrniche (ROU)
17 August 2024; 18:00	Jensen 8	(14–13)	Huang Z. 7	International Handball Hall, Chuzhou; Attendance: 5,050; Referees: Pîrvu, Potîrniche (ROU)
17 August 2024; 18:00		Report		International Handball Hall, Chuzhou; Attendance: 5,050; Referees: Pîrvu, Potîrniche (ROU)

17 August 2024; 18:00	Chinese Taipei	28–15	Greenland	Vocational and Technical College Stadium, Chuzhou; Attendance: 550; Referees: Haggui, Haggui (TUN)
17 August 2024; 18:00	Lin C. 6	(15–5)	Bjørnestad, Jensen 5	Vocational and Technical College Stadium, Chuzhou; Attendance: 550; Referees: Haggui, Haggui (TUN)
17 August 2024; 18:00	3× (suspension)	Report		Vocational and Technical College Stadium, Chuzhou; Attendance: 550; Referees: Haggui, Haggui (TUN)

=== Group F ===
Pos	Team	Pld	W	D	L	GF	GA	GD	Pts	Qualification
1	Hungary	3	3	0	0	106	53	+53	6	Main round
2	Norway	3	2	0	1	97	56	+41	4	Main round
3	Argentina	3	1	0	2	62	72	−10	2	Presidents Cup
4	Kazakhstan	3	0	0	3	31	115	−84	0	Presidents Cup

Source: IHF
Rules for classification: 1) points; 2) head-to-head points; 3) head-to-head goal difference; 4) head-to-head number of goals scored; 5) goal difference.

14 August 2024; 18:00	Hungary	31–18	Argentina	Olympic Sports Center, Chuzhou; Attendance: 200; Referees: Fabryczny, Rawicki (POL)
14 August 2024; 18:00	Papp, Keceli-Mészáros 6	(14–9)	Patrone 5	Olympic Sports Center, Chuzhou; Attendance: 200; Referees: Fabryczny, Rawicki (POL)
14 August 2024; 18:00	1× (yellow card) 8× (suspension)	Report	1× (yellow card) 3× (suspension)	Olympic Sports Center, Chuzhou; Attendance: 200; Referees: Fabryczny, Rawicki (POL)

14 August 2024; 20:00	Norway	43–9	Kazakhstan	Olympic Sports Center, Chuzhou; Attendance: 100; Referees: Araújo, Perdomo (URU)
14 August 2024; 20:00	three players 6	(21–2)	Altynbek 4	Olympic Sports Center, Chuzhou; Attendance: 100; Referees: Araújo, Perdomo (URU)
14 August 2024; 20:00	1× (yellow card) 1× (suspension)	Report	1× (suspension)	Olympic Sports Center, Chuzhou; Attendance: 100; Referees: Araújo, Perdomo (URU)

16 August 2024; 16:00	Kazakhstan	9–45	Hungary	Olympic Sports Center, Chuzhou; Attendance: 300; Referees: Haggui, Haggui (TUN)
16 August 2024; 16:00	Ertazayeva, Paley 3	(5–22)	Bede 7	Olympic Sports Center, Chuzhou; Attendance: 300; Referees: Haggui, Haggui (TUN)
16 August 2024; 16:00	1× (yellow card) 4× (suspension)	Report	2× (suspension)	Olympic Sports Center, Chuzhou; Attendance: 300; Referees: Haggui, Haggui (TUN)

16 August 2024; 18:00	Norway	28–17	Argentina	Olympic Sports Center, Chuzhou; Attendance: 300; Referees: Al-Enezi, Al-Naseem (KUW)
16 August 2024; 18:00	Gulbrandsen 9	(13–9)	Molina 6	Olympic Sports Center, Chuzhou; Attendance: 300; Referees: Al-Enezi, Al-Naseem (KUW)
16 August 2024; 18:00	3× (suspension)	Report	2× (suspension)	Olympic Sports Center, Chuzhou; Attendance: 300; Referees: Al-Enezi, Al-Naseem (KUW)

17 August 2024; 20:00	Argentina	27–13	Kazakhstan	Olympic Sports Center, Chuzhou; Attendance: 300; Referees: Al-Wahibi, Al-Shahi (OMA)
17 August 2024; 20:00	Losarcos 9	(12–9)	Altynbek 5	Olympic Sports Center, Chuzhou; Attendance: 300; Referees: Al-Wahibi, Al-Shahi (OMA)
17 August 2024; 20:00	3× (suspension)	Report	1× (suspension)	Olympic Sports Center, Chuzhou; Attendance: 300; Referees: Al-Wahibi, Al-Shahi (OMA)

17 August 2024; 20:00	Hungary	30–26	Norway	International Handball Hall, Chuzhou; Attendance: 500; Referees: Bolic, Hurich (AUT)
17 August 2024; 20:00	Fazekas 13	(17–10)	Halldorsson 5	International Handball Hall, Chuzhou; Attendance: 500; Referees: Bolic, Hurich (AUT)
17 August 2024; 20:00		Report	3× (suspension) 1× (red card)	International Handball Hall, Chuzhou; Attendance: 500; Referees: Bolic, Hurich (AUT)

=== Group G ===
Pos	Team	Pld	W	D	L	GF	GA	GD	Pts	Qualification
1	Spain	3	3	0	0	87	63	+24	6	Main round
2	Switzerland	3	2	0	1	74	68	+6	4	Main round
3	Romania	3	1	0	2	80	79	+1	2	Presidents Cup
4	Egypt	3	0	0	3	70	101	−31	0	Presidents Cup

Source: IHF
Rules for classification: 1) points; 2) head-to-head points; 3) head-to-head goal difference; 4) head-to-head number of goals scored; 5) goal difference.

14 August 2024; 16:00	Romania	24–25	Switzerland	Olympic Sports Center, Chuzhou; Attendance: 100; Referees: Duplii, Pobedrina (UKR)
14 August 2024; 16:00	Niță 5	(16–12)	Baumann 6	Olympic Sports Center, Chuzhou; Attendance: 100; Referees: Duplii, Pobedrina (UKR)
14 August 2024; 16:00	8× (suspension)	Report	1× (yellow card) 3× (suspension)	Olympic Sports Center, Chuzhou; Attendance: 100; Referees: Duplii, Pobedrina (UKR)

14 August 2024; 18:00	Egypt	22–37	Spain	Vocational and Technical College Stadium, Chuzhou; Attendance: 300; Referees: Godoy, Magalhães (BRA)
14 August 2024; 18:00	Safeyelden 7	(11–19)	Solís 7	Vocational and Technical College Stadium, Chuzhou; Attendance: 300; Referees: Godoy, Magalhães (BRA)
14 August 2024; 18:00	2× (suspension)	Report	4× (suspension)	Vocational and Technical College Stadium, Chuzhou; Attendance: 300; Referees: Godoy, Magalhães (BRA)

16 August 2024; 12:00	Switzerland	28–19	Egypt	Olympic Sports Center, Chuzhou; Attendance: 100; Referees: Araújo, Perdomo (URU)
16 August 2024; 12:00	Emmenegger 7	(11–7)	S. Mahmoud 5	Olympic Sports Center, Chuzhou; Attendance: 100; Referees: Araújo, Perdomo (URU)
16 August 2024; 12:00	2× (suspension)	Report	4× (suspension)	Olympic Sports Center, Chuzhou; Attendance: 100; Referees: Araújo, Perdomo (URU)

16 August 2024; 14:00	Romania	20–25	Spain	Olympic Sports Center, Chuzhou; Attendance: 200; Referees: Kažanegra, Vujačić (MNE)
16 August 2024; 14:00	Bodijar 6	(11–13)	B. Rodríguez 9	Olympic Sports Center, Chuzhou; Attendance: 200; Referees: Kažanegra, Vujačić (MNE)
16 August 2024; 14:00	1× (yellow card) 4× (suspension)	Report	1× (yellow card) 3× (suspension)	Olympic Sports Center, Chuzhou; Attendance: 200; Referees: Kažanegra, Vujačić (MNE)

17 August 2024; 16:00	Spain	25–21	Switzerland	Olympic Sports Center, Chuzhou; Attendance: 400; Referees: Hansen, Jensen (DEN)
17 August 2024; 16:00	four players 3	(14–13)	Brunett 7	Olympic Sports Center, Chuzhou; Attendance: 400; Referees: Hansen, Jensen (DEN)
17 August 2024; 16:00	1× (suspension)	Report	3× (suspension)	Olympic Sports Center, Chuzhou; Attendance: 400; Referees: Hansen, Jensen (DEN)

17 August 2024; 18:00	Egypt	29–36	Romania	Olympic Sports Center, Chuzhou; Attendance: 400; Referees: Ismoilov, Ismoilov (UZB)
17 August 2024; 18:00	Mahmoud 10	(14–17)	three players 6	Olympic Sports Center, Chuzhou; Attendance: 400; Referees: Ismoilov, Ismoilov (UZB)
17 August 2024; 18:00	3× (suspension)	Report	1× (suspension) 1× (red card)	Olympic Sports Center, Chuzhou; Attendance: 400; Referees: Ismoilov, Ismoilov (UZB)

=== Group H ===
Pos	Team	Pld	W	D	L	GF	GA	GD	Pts	Qualification
1	Germany	3	3	0	0	106	67	+39	6	Main round
2	Czechia	3	2	0	1	83	63	+20	4	Main round
3	Iceland	3	1	0	2	68	79	−11	2	Presidents Cup
4	Guinea	3	0	0	3	51	99	−48	0	Presidents Cup

Source: IHF
Rules for classification: 1) points; 2) head-to-head points; 3) head-to-head goal difference; 4) head-to-head number of goals scored; 5) goal difference.

14 August 2024; 14:00	Germany	42–18	Guinea	International Handball Hall, Chuzhou; Attendance: 250; Referees: Altmár, Horváth (HUN)
14 August 2024; 14:00	Tucholke 9	(22–9)	Koumbassa, H. Sylla 4	International Handball Hall, Chuzhou; Attendance: 250; Referees: Altmár, Horváth (HUN)
14 August 2024; 14:00	1× (suspension)	Report	5× (suspension)	International Handball Hall, Chuzhou; Attendance: 250; Referees: Altmár, Horváth (HUN)

14 August 2024; 16:00	Czechia	28–17	Iceland	International Handball Hall, Chuzhou; Attendance: 800; Referees: Bolic, Hurich (AUT)
14 August 2024; 16:00	Rampová 6	(16–4)	Hrafnkelsdóttir, Pálsdóttir 3	International Handball Hall, Chuzhou; Attendance: 800; Referees: Bolic, Hurich (AUT)
14 August 2024; 16:00	4× (suspension)	Report	1× (yellow card) 4× (suspension)	International Handball Hall, Chuzhou; Attendance: 800; Referees: Bolic, Hurich (AUT)

16 August 2024; 12:00	Czechia	32–13	Guinea	International Handball Hall, Chuzhou; Attendance: 50; Referees: Fremstad, Jørstad (NOR)
16 August 2024; 12:00	Rampová 7	(17–5)	Koumbassa 4	International Handball Hall, Chuzhou; Attendance: 50; Referees: Fremstad, Jørstad (NOR)
16 August 2024; 12:00	3× (suspension)	Report	8× (suspension) 1× (red card)	International Handball Hall, Chuzhou; Attendance: 50; Referees: Fremstad, Jørstad (NOR)

16 August 2024; 14:00	Iceland	26–31	Germany	International Handball Hall, Chuzhou; Attendance: 150; Referees: Correa, Conberse (ARG)
16 August 2024; 14:00	Eiríksdóttir 7	(15–14)	Tucholke, Walther 6	International Handball Hall, Chuzhou; Attendance: 150; Referees: Correa, Conberse (ARG)
16 August 2024; 14:00	2× (yellow card) 4× (suspension)	Report	1× (yellow card) 4× (suspension)	International Handball Hall, Chuzhou; Attendance: 150; Referees: Correa, Conberse (ARG)

17 August 2024; 16:00	Guinea	20–25	Iceland	Vocational and Technical College Stadium, Chuzhou; Attendance: 450; Referees: Cheng, Zhou (CHN)
17 August 2024; 16:00	H. Sylla 5	(11–13)	Pálsdóttir 6	Vocational and Technical College Stadium, Chuzhou; Attendance: 450; Referees: Cheng, Zhou (CHN)
17 August 2024; 16:00	1× (yellow card) 5× (suspension) 1× (red card)	Report		Vocational and Technical College Stadium, Chuzhou; Attendance: 450; Referees: Cheng, Zhou (CHN)

17 August 2024; 16:00	Germany	33–23	Czechia	International Handball Hall, Chuzhou; Attendance: 400; Referees: Kažanegra, Vujačić (MNE)
17 August 2024; 16:00	Rohr, Tucholke 7	(17–5)	Pazderová 5	International Handball Hall, Chuzhou; Attendance: 400; Referees: Kažanegra, Vujačić (MNE)
17 August 2024; 16:00	2× (suspension)	Report	2× (suspension)	International Handball Hall, Chuzhou; Attendance: 400; Referees: Kažanegra, Vujačić (MNE)

== President's Cup ==
Points obtained in the matches against the team from the group are taken over.

=== Group I ===
Pos	Team	Pld	W	D	L	GF	GA	GD	Pts	Qualification
1	Austria	3	3	0	0	106	57	+49	6	17–20th place semifinals
2	Nigeria	3	1	0	2	65	77	−12	2 (Note: Nigeria 2 Pts, +7 GD; Angola 2 Pts, +3 GD; Chile 2 Pts, −10 GD)	21st–24th place semifinals
3	Angola	3	1	0	2	73	88	−15	2	25–28th place semifinals
4	Chile	3	1	0	2	67	89	−22	2	29th–32nd place semifinals

Source: IHF
Rules for classification: 1) points; 2) head-to-head points; 3) head-to-head goal difference; 4) head-to-head number of goals scored; 5) goal difference.
Notes:

18 August 2024; 12:00	Austria	38–20	Angola	Olympic Sports Center, Chuzhou; Attendance: 150; Referees: Fabryczny, Rawicki (POL)
18 August 2024; 12:00	Polanszky 7	(13–9)	C. Domingos 8	Olympic Sports Center, Chuzhou; Attendance: 150; Referees: Fabryczny, Rawicki (POL)
18 August 2024; 12:00	1× (suspension)	Report	6× (suspension)	Olympic Sports Center, Chuzhou; Attendance: 150; Referees: Fabryczny, Rawicki (POL)

18 August 2024; 14:00	Nigeria	22–23	Chile	Olympic Sports Center, Chuzhou; Attendance: 300; Referees: Watson, Welin (SWE)
18 August 2024; 14:00	Babatunde 7	(10–11)	Larenas 7	Olympic Sports Center, Chuzhou; Attendance: 300; Referees: Watson, Welin (SWE)
18 August 2024; 14:00	6× (suspension) 1× (red card)	Report	1× (suspension)	Olympic Sports Center, Chuzhou; Attendance: 300; Referees: Watson, Welin (SWE)

20 August 2024; 12:00	Austria	33–14	Nigeria	Vocational and Technical College Stadium, Chuzhou; Attendance: 100; Referees: Cheng, Zhou (CHN)
20 August 2024; 12:00	Chroust, Egbaimo 5	(17–8)	Onyekwere 4	Vocational and Technical College Stadium, Chuzhou; Attendance: 100; Referees: Cheng, Zhou (CHN)
20 August 2024; 12:00	1× (suspension)	Report	3× (suspension)	Vocational and Technical College Stadium, Chuzhou; Attendance: 100; Referees: Cheng, Zhou (CHN)

20 August 2024; 14:00	Chile	21–32	Angola	Vocational and Technical College Stadium, Chuzhou; Attendance: 250; Referees: Kažanegra, Vujačić (MNE)
20 August 2024; 14:00	González 4	(9–11)	C. Domingos 14	Vocational and Technical College Stadium, Chuzhou; Attendance: 250; Referees: Kažanegra, Vujačić (MNE)
20 August 2024; 14:00	1× (yellow card) 1× (suspension)	Report	1× (yellow card) 6× (suspension)	Vocational and Technical College Stadium, Chuzhou; Attendance: 250; Referees: Kažanegra, Vujačić (MNE)

=== Group II ===
Pos	Team	Pld	W	D	L	GF	GA	GD	Pts	Qualification
1	South Korea	3	3	0	0	137	52	+85	6	17–20th place semifinals
2	Kosovo	3	2	0	1	72	65	+7	4	21st–24th place semifinals
3	India	3	1	0	2	52	86	−34	2	25–28th place semifinals
4	Canada	3	0	0	3	58	116	−58	0	29th–32nd place semifinals

Source: IHF
Rules for classification: 1) points; 2) head-to-head points; 3) head-to-head goal difference; 4) head-to-head number of goals scored; 5) goal difference.

18 August 2024; 16:00	Kosovo	26–20	Canada	Olympic Sports Center, Chuzhou; Attendance: 500; Referees: El Ghass, El Malwane (MAR)
18 August 2024; 16:00	Gjergjaj 7	(9–12)	Boisclair 6	Olympic Sports Center, Chuzhou; Attendance: 500; Referees: El Ghass, El Malwane (MAR)
18 August 2024; 16:00	3× (suspension)	Report	2× (suspension)	Olympic Sports Center, Chuzhou; Attendance: 500; Referees: El Ghass, El Malwane (MAR)

18 August 2024; 18:00	South Korea	40–14	India	Olympic Sports Center, Chuzhou; Attendance: 500; Referees: Fremstad, Jørstad (NOR)
18 August 2024; 18:00	Lee J. 9	(19–4)	Tamanna, Sujata 4	Olympic Sports Center, Chuzhou; Attendance: 500; Referees: Fremstad, Jørstad (NOR)
18 August 2024; 18:00	2× (suspension)	Report	2× (suspension)	Olympic Sports Center, Chuzhou; Attendance: 500; Referees: Fremstad, Jørstad (NOR)

20 August 2024; 10:00	South Korea	31–21	Kosovo	Olympic Sports Center, Chuzhou; Attendance: 100; Referees: Al-Shahi, Al-Wahibi (OMA)
20 August 2024; 10:00	Ku 7	(14–11)	Dresh 10	Olympic Sports Center, Chuzhou; Attendance: 100; Referees: Al-Shahi, Al-Wahibi (OMA)
20 August 2024; 10:00	4× (suspension)	Report	1× (yellow card) 2× (suspension)	Olympic Sports Center, Chuzhou; Attendance: 100; Referees: Al-Shahi, Al-Wahibi (OMA)

20 August 2024; 12:00	Canada	21–24	India	Olympic Sports Center, Chuzhou; Attendance: 250; Referees: Araújo, Perdomo (URU)
20 August 2024; 12:00	Lemaire 8	(11–7)	Sujata 10	Olympic Sports Center, Chuzhou; Attendance: 250; Referees: Araújo, Perdomo (URU)
20 August 2024; 12:00	5× (suspension) 1× (red card)	Report	7× (suspension)	Olympic Sports Center, Chuzhou; Attendance: 250; Referees: Araújo, Perdomo (URU)

=== Group III ===
Pos	Team	Pld	W	D	L	GF	GA	GD	Pts	Qualification
1	Argentina	3	3	0	0	83	53	+30	6	17–20th place semifinals
2	Chinese Taipei	3	2	0	1	77	71	+6	4	21st–24th place semifinals
3	Kazakhstan	3	1	0	2	59	75	−16	2	25–28th place semifinals
4	Greenland	3	0	0	3	54	74	−20	0	29th–32nd place semifinals

Source: IHF
Rules for classification: 1) points; 2) head-to-head points; 3) head-to-head goal difference; 4) head-to-head number of goals scored; 5) goal difference.

19 August 2024; 12:00	Chinese Taipei	28–22	Kazakhstan	Olympic Sports Center, Chuzhou; Attendance: 100; Referees: Pîrvu, Potîrniche (ROU)
19 August 2024; 12:00	Lin C. 8	(10–8)	Ertazayeva 8	Olympic Sports Center, Chuzhou; Attendance: 100; Referees: Pîrvu, Potîrniche (ROU)
19 August 2024; 12:00	2× (suspension)	Report	4× (suspension)	Olympic Sports Center, Chuzhou; Attendance: 100; Referees: Pîrvu, Potîrniche (ROU)

19 August 2024; 14:00	Argentina	22–19	Greenland	Olympic Sports Center, Chuzhou; Attendance: 150; Referees: Duplii, Pobedrina (UKR)
19 August 2024; 14:00	Molina 8	(8–8)	P. Petersen 12	Olympic Sports Center, Chuzhou; Attendance: 150; Referees: Duplii, Pobedrina (UKR)
19 August 2024; 14:00	1× (yellow card) 5× (suspension)	Report	1× (suspension)	Olympic Sports Center, Chuzhou; Attendance: 150; Referees: Duplii, Pobedrina (UKR)

20 August 2024; 10:00	Chinese Taipei	21–34	Argentina	International Handball Hall, Chuzhou; Attendance: 100; Referees: Al-Enezi, Al-Naseem (KUW)
20 August 2024; 10:00	Chang F., Chuan 6	(12–19)	Molina 6	International Handball Hall, Chuzhou; Attendance: 100; Referees: Al-Enezi, Al-Naseem (KUW)
20 August 2024; 10:00	5× (suspension)	Report	1× (suspension)	International Handball Hall, Chuzhou; Attendance: 100; Referees: Al-Enezi, Al-Naseem (KUW)

20 August 2024; 12:00	Greenland	20–24	Kazakhstan	International Handball Hall, Chuzhou; Attendance: 300; Referees: Picard, Vauchez (FRA)
20 August 2024; 12:00	P. Petersen 8	(12–12)	three players 5	International Handball Hall, Chuzhou; Attendance: 300; Referees: Picard, Vauchez (FRA)
20 August 2024; 12:00	4× (suspension)	Report	6× (suspension)	International Handball Hall, Chuzhou; Attendance: 300; Referees: Picard, Vauchez (FRA)

=== Group IV ===
Pos	Team	Pld	W	D	L	GF	GA	GD	Pts	Qualification
1	Romania	3	3	0	0	94	56	+38	6	17–20th place semifinals
2	Egypt	3	1	1	1	67	68	−1	3 (Note: Iceland 20–20 Egypt)	21st–24th place semifinals
3	Iceland	3	1	1	1	59	67	−8	3	25–28th place semifinals
4	Guinea	3	0	0	3	45	74	−29	0	29th–32nd place semifinals

Source: IHF
Rules for classification: 1) points; 2) head-to-head points; 3) head-to-head goal difference; 4) head-to-head number of goals scored; 5) goal difference.
Notes:

19 August 2024; 16:00	Romania	31–13	Guinea	Olympic Sports Center, Chuzhou; Attendance: 100; Referees: Hansen, Jensen (DEN)
19 August 2024; 16:00	Bodijar 6	(16–7)	A. Diallo, H. Sylla 4	Olympic Sports Center, Chuzhou; Attendance: 100; Referees: Hansen, Jensen (DEN)
19 August 2024; 16:00	8× (suspension)	Report	3× (suspension)	Olympic Sports Center, Chuzhou; Attendance: 100; Referees: Hansen, Jensen (DEN)

19 August 2024; 18:00	Iceland	20–20	Egypt	Olympic Sports Center, Chuzhou; Attendance: 150; Referees: Picard, Vauchez (FRA)
19 August 2024; 18:00	Pálsdóttir 8	(11–11)	Safeyelden 8	Olympic Sports Center, Chuzhou; Attendance: 150; Referees: Picard, Vauchez (FRA)
19 August 2024; 18:00	4× (suspension)	Report	5× (suspension) 1× (red card)	Olympic Sports Center, Chuzhou; Attendance: 150; Referees: Picard, Vauchez (FRA)

20 August 2024; 16:00	Romania	27–14	Iceland	Vocational and Technical College Stadium, Chuzhou; Attendance: 380; Referees: Haggui, Haggui (TUN)
20 August 2024; 16:00	Mosor 9	(13–9)	Gunnthórsdóttir 4	Vocational and Technical College Stadium, Chuzhou; Attendance: 380; Referees: Haggui, Haggui (TUN)
20 August 2024; 16:00	2× (suspension)	Report	1× (yellow card) 3× (suspension)	Vocational and Technical College Stadium, Chuzhou; Attendance: 380; Referees: Haggui, Haggui (TUN)

20 August 2024; 18:00	Egypt	18–12	Guinea	Vocational and Technical College Stadium, Chuzhou; Attendance: 350; Referees: Watson, Welin (SWE)
20 August 2024; 18:00	Mahmoud, Safeyelden 5	(14–5)	three players 2	Vocational and Technical College Stadium, Chuzhou; Attendance: 350; Referees: Watson, Welin (SWE)
20 August 2024; 18:00	4× (suspension)	Report	9× (suspension)	Vocational and Technical College Stadium, Chuzhou; Attendance: 350; Referees: Watson, Welin (SWE)

== Main round ==
Points obtained in the matches against the team from the group are taken over.

=== Group I ===
Pos	Team	Pld	W	D	L	GF	GA	GD	Pts	Qualification
1	Croatia	3	2	1	0	62	54	+8	5	Quarterfinals
2	Serbia	3	2	0	1	66	59	+7	4	Quarterfinals
3	Montenegro	3	0	2	1	51	57	−6	2	9–12th place semifinals
4	Sweden	3	0	1	2	63	72	−9	1	13–16th place semifinals

Source: IHF
Rules for classification: 1) points; 2) head-to-head points; 3) head-to-head goal difference; 4) head-to-head number of goals scored; 5) goal difference.

18 August 2024; 12:00	Sweden	19–19	Montenegro	International Handball Hall, Chuzhou; Attendance: 76; Referees: Godoy, Magalhães (BRA)
18 August 2024; 12:00	five players 3	(9–8)	Ramusović 5	International Handball Hall, Chuzhou; Attendance: 76; Referees: Godoy, Magalhães (BRA)
18 August 2024; 12:00	3× (suspension)	Report	5× (suspension)	International Handball Hall, Chuzhou; Attendance: 76; Referees: Godoy, Magalhães (BRA)

18 August 2024; 14:00	Croatia	20–17	Serbia	International Handball Hall, Chuzhou; Attendance: 226; Referees: Araújo, Perdomo (URU)
18 August 2024; 14:00	Vuković 4	(10–9)	Nedeljković 4	International Handball Hall, Chuzhou; Attendance: 226; Referees: Araújo, Perdomo (URU)
18 August 2024; 14:00	2× (yellow card) 1× (suspension)	Report	1× (yellow card) 5× (suspension)	International Handball Hall, Chuzhou; Attendance: 226; Referees: Araújo, Perdomo (URU)

20 August 2024; 14:00	Sweden	19–24	Croatia	Olympic Sports Center, Chuzhou; Attendance: 200; Referees: Bolic, Hurich (AUT)
20 August 2024; 14:00	Huselius 9	(10–12)	Brusić 5	Olympic Sports Center, Chuzhou; Attendance: 200; Referees: Bolic, Hurich (AUT)
20 August 2024; 14:00	1× (suspension) 1× (red card)	Report	1× (yellow card) 3× (suspension)	Olympic Sports Center, Chuzhou; Attendance: 200; Referees: Bolic, Hurich (AUT)

20 August 2024; 16:00	Serbia	20–14	Montenegro	Olympic Sports Center, Chuzhou; Attendance: 200; Referees: Correa, Conberse (ARG)
20 August 2024; 16:00	Nedeljković, Stanić 5	(9–5)	Ramusović 6	Olympic Sports Center, Chuzhou; Attendance: 200; Referees: Correa, Conberse (ARG)
20 August 2024; 16:00	4× (suspension)	Report	5× (suspension) 1× (red card)	Olympic Sports Center, Chuzhou; Attendance: 200; Referees: Correa, Conberse (ARG)

=== Group II ===
Pos	Team	Pld	W	D	L	GF	GA	GD	Pts	Qualification
1	France	3	2	0	1	83	66	+17	4 (Note: Japan 24–26 France)	Quarterfinals
2	Japan	3	2	0	1	85	72	+13	4	Quarterfinals
3	Brazil	3	1	0	2	60	86	−26	2 (Note: Netherlands 22–23 Brazil)	9–12th place semifinals
4	Netherlands	3	1	0	2	73	77	−4	2	13–16th place semifinals

Source: IHF
Rules for classification: 1) points; 2) head-to-head points; 3) head-to-head goal difference; 4) head-to-head number of goals scored; 5) goal difference.
Notes:

18 August 2024; 16:00	Japan	30–19	Brazil	International Handball Hall, Chuzhou; Attendance: 120; Referees: Diop, Faye (SEN)
18 August 2024; 16:00	Matsumoto 9	(14–12)	Dovigo, Vitor 3	International Handball Hall, Chuzhou; Attendance: 120; Referees: Diop, Faye (SEN)
18 August 2024; 16:00	1× (yellow card) 2× (suspension)	Report		International Handball Hall, Chuzhou; Attendance: 120; Referees: Diop, Faye (SEN)

18 August 2024; 18:00	France	23–24	Netherlands	International Handball Hall, Chuzhou; Attendance: 398; Referees: Al-Enezi, Al-Naseem (KUW)
18 August 2024; 18:00	Kingue 6	(8–11)	Horvers 7	International Handball Hall, Chuzhou; Attendance: 398; Referees: Al-Enezi, Al-Naseem (KUW)
18 August 2024; 18:00	2× (suspension)	Report	2× (suspension)	International Handball Hall, Chuzhou; Attendance: 398; Referees: Al-Enezi, Al-Naseem (KUW)

20 August 2024; 14:00	Netherlands	22–23	Brazil	International Handball Hall, Chuzhou; Attendance: 150; Referees: Fremstad, Jørstad (NOR)
20 August 2024; 14:00	four players 3	(10–11)	Ladeia 9	International Handball Hall, Chuzhou; Attendance: 150; Referees: Fremstad, Jørstad (NOR)
20 August 2024; 14:00	2× (suspension)	Report	2× (suspension)	International Handball Hall, Chuzhou; Attendance: 150; Referees: Fremstad, Jørstad (NOR)

20 August 2024; 16:00	Japan	24–26	France	International Handball Hall, Chuzhou; Attendance: 200; Referees: Godoy, Magalhães (BRA)
20 August 2024; 16:00	Nakamura 7	(11–11)	Abdou 7	International Handball Hall, Chuzhou; Attendance: 200; Referees: Godoy, Magalhães (BRA)
20 August 2024; 16:00	1× (suspension)	Report	1× (suspension)	International Handball Hall, Chuzhou; Attendance: 200; Referees: Godoy, Magalhães (BRA)

=== Group III ===
Pos	Team	Pld	W	D	L	GF	GA	GD	Pts	Qualification
1	Hungary	3	3	0	0	83	73	+10	6	Quarterfinals
2	Denmark	3	2	0	1	82	74	+8	4	Quarterfinals
3	Norway	3	1	0	2	78	83	−5	2	9–12th place semifinals
4	China (H)	3	0	0	3	68	81	−13	0	13–16th place semifinals

Source: IHF
Rules for classification: 1) points; 2) head-to-head points; 3) head-to-head goal difference; 4) head-to-head number of goals scored; 5) goal difference.
(H) Hosts

19 August 2024; 16:00	Denmark	29–25	Norway	International Handball Hall, Chuzhou; Attendance: 350; Referees: Kažanegra, Vujačić (MNE)
19 August 2024; 16:00	Norskov 7	(15–17)	With 9	International Handball Hall, Chuzhou; Attendance: 350; Referees: Kažanegra, Vujačić (MNE)
19 August 2024; 16:00	2× (suspension)	Report	3× (suspension)	International Handball Hall, Chuzhou; Attendance: 350; Referees: Kažanegra, Vujačić (MNE)

19 August 2024; 18:00	Hungary	26–22	China	International Handball Hall, Chuzhou; Attendance: 3,104; Referees: El-Beltagy, Mahmoud (EGY)
19 August 2024; 18:00	Fazekas 12	(14–11)	Pan 5	International Handball Hall, Chuzhou; Attendance: 3,104; Referees: El-Beltagy, Mahmoud (EGY)
19 August 2024; 18:00	1× (yellow card) 1× (suspension)	Report	2× (suspension)	International Handball Hall, Chuzhou; Attendance: 3,104; Referees: El-Beltagy, Mahmoud (EGY)

20 August 2024; 18:00	China	24–27	Norway	International Handball Hall, Chuzhou; Attendance: 5,680; Referees: Ismoilov, Ismoilov (UZB)
20 August 2024; 18:00	Liang 7	(12–13)	Ekerhovd, Halldorsson 5	International Handball Hall, Chuzhou; Attendance: 5,680; Referees: Ismoilov, Ismoilov (UZB)
20 August 2024; 18:00	2× (suspension)	Report	5× (suspension)	International Handball Hall, Chuzhou; Attendance: 5,680; Referees: Ismoilov, Ismoilov (UZB)

20 August 2024; 20:00	Denmark	25–27	Hungary	International Handball Hall, Chuzhou; Attendance: 200; Referees: Fabryczny, Rawicki (POL)
20 August 2024; 20:00	Plougstrup 9	(14–13)	three players 5	International Handball Hall, Chuzhou; Attendance: 200; Referees: Fabryczny, Rawicki (POL)
20 August 2024; 20:00	1× (yellow card) 5× (suspension)	Report	2× (suspension)	International Handball Hall, Chuzhou; Attendance: 200; Referees: Fabryczny, Rawicki (POL)

=== Group IV ===
Pos	Team	Pld	W	D	L	GF	GA	GD	Pts	Qualification
1	Spain	3	3	0	0	76	61	+15	6	Quarterfinals
2	Germany	3	1	1	1	77	71	+6	3	Quarterfinals
3	Czechia	3	1	0	2	60	74	−14	2	9–12th place semifinals
4	Switzerland	3	0	1	2	59	66	−7	1	13–16th place semifinals

Source: IHF
Rules for classification: 1) points; 2) head-to-head points; 3) head-to-head goal difference; 4) head-to-head number of goals scored; 5) goal difference.

19 August 2024; 12:00	Spain	26–19	Czechia	International Handball Hall, Chuzhou; Attendance: 80; Referees: Metalari, Nikolovski (MKD)
19 August 2024; 12:00	García, E. Rodríguez 4	(13–10)	Rampová 5	International Handball Hall, Chuzhou; Attendance: 80; Referees: Metalari, Nikolovski (MKD)
19 August 2024; 12:00	3× (suspension)	Report	3× (suspension)	International Handball Hall, Chuzhou; Attendance: 80; Referees: Metalari, Nikolovski (MKD)

19 August 2024; 14:00	Germany	23–23	Switzerland	International Handball Hall, Chuzhou; Attendance: 120; Referees: Altmár, Horváth (HUN)
19 August 2024; 14:00	Klocke, Tucholke 5	(14–12)	Baumann 7	International Handball Hall, Chuzhou; Attendance: 120; Referees: Altmár, Horváth (HUN)
19 August 2024; 14:00	4× (suspension)	Report	1× (suspension)	International Handball Hall, Chuzhou; Attendance: 120; Referees: Altmár, Horváth (HUN)

20 August 2024; 18:00	Spain	25–21	Germany	Olympic Sports Center, Chuzhou; Attendance: 300; Referees: Hansen, Jensen (DEN)
20 August 2024; 18:00	B. Rodríguez 5	(14–13)	Tucholke 10	Olympic Sports Center, Chuzhou; Attendance: 300; Referees: Hansen, Jensen (DEN)
20 August 2024; 18:00	1× (yellow card) 2× (suspension)	Report	2× (suspension)	Olympic Sports Center, Chuzhou; Attendance: 300; Referees: Hansen, Jensen (DEN)

20 August 2024; 20:00	Switzerland	15–18	Czechia	Olympic Sports Center, Chuzhou; Attendance: 300; Referees: Diop, Faye (SEN)
20 August 2024; 20:00	Grüring 6	(6–12)	Rampová 4	Olympic Sports Center, Chuzhou; Attendance: 300; Referees: Diop, Faye (SEN)
20 August 2024; 20:00	2× (suspension)	Report	1× (yellow card) 2× (suspension)	Olympic Sports Center, Chuzhou; Attendance: 300; Referees: Diop, Faye (SEN)

== Placement matches ==
=== 29th place bracket ===
29–32nd place semifinals
22 August
Chile	29
Greenland	24
22 August
Canada	21
Guinea	31

29th place game
23 August
Chile	19
Guinea	18
31st place game
23 August
Greenland	18
Canada	27

==== 29th–32nd place semifinals ====
22 August 2024; 11:15	Canada	21–31	Guinea	Vocational and Technical College Stadium, Chuzhou; Attendance: 300; Referees: Correa, Conberse (ARG)
22 August 2024; 11:15	Leclair, Rioux 5	(9–18)	Camara, Koumbassa 7	Vocational and Technical College Stadium, Chuzhou; Attendance: 300; Referees: Correa, Conberse (ARG)
22 August 2024; 11:15	3× (suspension) 2× (red card)	Report	5× (suspension)	Vocational and Technical College Stadium, Chuzhou; Attendance: 300; Referees: Correa, Conberse (ARG)

22 August 2024; 13:30	Chile	29–24	Greenland	Vocational and Technical College Stadium, Chuzhou; Attendance: 250; Referees: Bolic, Hurich (AUT)
22 August 2024; 13:30	Lizana 8	(13–11)	Bjørnestad 7	Vocational and Technical College Stadium, Chuzhou; Attendance: 250; Referees: Bolic, Hurich (AUT)
22 August 2024; 13:30		Report	1× (suspension)	Vocational and Technical College Stadium, Chuzhou; Attendance: 250; Referees: Bolic, Hurich (AUT)

==== 31st place game ====
23 August 2024; 11:15	Greenland	18–27	Canada	Vocational and Technical College Stadium, Chuzhou; Attendance: 280; Referees: El-Beltagy, Mahmoud (EGY)
23 August 2024; 11:15	Bjørnestad 6	(9–13)	Boisclair 6	Vocational and Technical College Stadium, Chuzhou; Attendance: 280; Referees: El-Beltagy, Mahmoud (EGY)
23 August 2024; 11:15	1× (suspension)	Report	4× (suspension)	Vocational and Technical College Stadium, Chuzhou; Attendance: 280; Referees: El-Beltagy, Mahmoud (EGY)

==== 29th place game ====
23 August 2024; 13:30	Chile	19–18	Guinea	Vocational and Technical College Stadium, Chuzhou; Attendance: 300; Referees: Duplii, Pobedrina (UKR)
23 August 2024; 13:30	Larenas 5	(11–11)	Koumbassa 6	Vocational and Technical College Stadium, Chuzhou; Attendance: 300; Referees: Duplii, Pobedrina (UKR)
23 August 2024; 13:30	2× (suspension)	Report	7× (suspension)	Vocational and Technical College Stadium, Chuzhou; Attendance: 300; Referees: Duplii, Pobedrina (UKR)

=== 25th place bracket ===
25–28th place semifinals
22 August
Angola	22
Kazakhstan	20
22 August
India	15
Iceland	33

25th place game
23 August
Angola	21
Iceland	36
27th place game
23 August
Kazakhstan	29
India	22

==== 25–28th place semifinals ====
22 August 2024; 15:45	India	15–33	Iceland	Vocational and Technical College Stadium, Chuzhou; Attendance: 400; Referees: Al-Shahi, Al-Wahibi (OMA)
22 August 2024; 15:45	Sujata 7	(4–17)	Hrafnkelsdóttir 7	Vocational and Technical College Stadium, Chuzhou; Attendance: 400; Referees: Al-Shahi, Al-Wahibi (OMA)
22 August 2024; 15:45	2× (suspension)	Report	1× (suspension)	Vocational and Technical College Stadium, Chuzhou; Attendance: 400; Referees: Al-Shahi, Al-Wahibi (OMA)

22 August 2024; 18:00	Angola	22–20	Kazakhstan	Vocational and Technical College Stadium, Chuzhou; Attendance: 400; Referees: Fabryczny, Rawicki (POL)
22 August 2024; 18:00	Nunda 9	(11–7)	Paley 5	Vocational and Technical College Stadium, Chuzhou; Attendance: 400; Referees: Fabryczny, Rawicki (POL)
22 August 2024; 18:00	3× (suspension)	Report		Vocational and Technical College Stadium, Chuzhou; Attendance: 400; Referees: Fabryczny, Rawicki (POL)

==== 27th place game ====
23 August 2024; 15:45	Kazakhstan	29–22	India	Vocational and Technical College Stadium, Chuzhou; Attendance: 500; Referees: Pîrvu, Potîrniche (ROU)
23 August 2024; 15:45	Tursyn 10	(12–9)	Kafhi 9	Vocational and Technical College Stadium, Chuzhou; Attendance: 500; Referees: Pîrvu, Potîrniche (ROU)
23 August 2024; 15:45	5× (suspension)	Report	5× (suspension)	Vocational and Technical College Stadium, Chuzhou; Attendance: 500; Referees: Pîrvu, Potîrniche (ROU)

==== 25th place game ====
23 August 2024; 18:00	Angola	21–36	Iceland	Vocational and Technical College Stadium, Chuzhou; Attendance: 600; Referees: Godoy, Magalhães (BRA)
23 August 2024; 18:00	Nunda 9	(11–18)	Pálsdóttir 6	Vocational and Technical College Stadium, Chuzhou; Attendance: 600; Referees: Godoy, Magalhães (BRA)
23 August 2024; 18:00	1× (suspension)	Report		Vocational and Technical College Stadium, Chuzhou; Attendance: 600; Referees: Godoy, Magalhães (BRA)

=== 21st place bracket ===
21st–24th place semifinals
22 August
Nigeria	22
Chinese Taipei	29
22 August
Kosovo	22
Egypt	29

21st place game
23 August
Chinese Taipei	24
Egypt	42
23rd place game
23 August
Nigeria	18
Kosovo	21

==== 21st–24th place semifinals ====
22 August 2024; 09:00	Nigeria	22–29	Chinese Taipei	Olympic Sports Center, Chuzhou; Attendance: 100; Referees: Altmár, Horváth (HUN)
22 August 2024; 09:00	Oparaugo 6	(7–13)	Lin C. 11	Olympic Sports Center, Chuzhou; Attendance: 100; Referees: Altmár, Horváth (HUN)
22 August 2024; 09:00	4× (suspension)	Report	1× (yellow card)	Olympic Sports Center, Chuzhou; Attendance: 100; Referees: Altmár, Horváth (HUN)

22 August 2024; 11:15	Kosovo	22–29	Egypt	Olympic Sports Center, Chuzhou; Attendance: 100; Referees: Pîrvu, Potîrniche (ROM)
22 August 2024; 11:15	Imeraj 7	(8–14)	Waled Ghonim 8	Olympic Sports Center, Chuzhou; Attendance: 100; Referees: Pîrvu, Potîrniche (ROM)
22 August 2024; 11:15	1× (yellow card) 6× (suspension)	Report	5× (suspension)	Olympic Sports Center, Chuzhou; Attendance: 100; Referees: Pîrvu, Potîrniche (ROM)

==== 23rd place game ====
23 August 2024; 09:00	Nigeria	18–21	Kosovo	Olympic Sports Center, Chuzhou; Attendance: 100; Referees: Ismoilov, Ismoilov (UZB)
23 August 2024; 09:00	Babatunde 6	(7–7)	Dresh 10	Olympic Sports Center, Chuzhou; Attendance: 100; Referees: Ismoilov, Ismoilov (UZB)
23 August 2024; 09:00	5× (suspension) 1× (red card)	Report	5× (suspension)	Olympic Sports Center, Chuzhou; Attendance: 100; Referees: Ismoilov, Ismoilov (UZB)

==== 21st place game ====
23 August 2024; 11:15	Chinese Taipei	24–42	Egypt	Olympic Sports Center, Chuzhou; Attendance: 150; Referees: Diop, Faye (SEN)
23 August 2024; 11:15	Hsu F., Lin C. 4	(10–23)	Mohamed 6	Olympic Sports Center, Chuzhou; Attendance: 150; Referees: Diop, Faye (SEN)
23 August 2024; 11:15	4× (suspension)	Report		Olympic Sports Center, Chuzhou; Attendance: 150; Referees: Diop, Faye (SEN)

=== 17th place bracket ===
17–20th place semifinals
22 August
Austria	23
Argentina	25
22 August
South Korea	31
Romania	32

17th place game
23 August
Argentina	19
Romania	25
19th place game
23 August
Austria	27
South Korea	32

==== 17–20th place semifinals ====
22 August 2024; 09:00	Austria	23–25	Argentina	International Handball Hall, Chuzhou; Attendance: 150; Referees: Ismoilov, Ismoilov (UZB)
22 August 2024; 09:00	Baljak 7	(11–12)	Molina 9	International Handball Hall, Chuzhou; Attendance: 150; Referees: Ismoilov, Ismoilov (UZB)
22 August 2024; 09:00	3× (suspension)	Report	4× (suspension)	International Handball Hall, Chuzhou; Attendance: 150; Referees: Ismoilov, Ismoilov (UZB)

22 August 2024; 11:15	South Korea	31–32	Romania	International Handball Hall, Chuzhou; Attendance: 100; Referees: Diop, Faye (SEN)
22 August 2024; 11:15	Lee Y. 10	(13–13)	Serban 9	International Handball Hall, Chuzhou; Attendance: 100; Referees: Diop, Faye (SEN)
22 August 2024; 11:15	2× (suspension)	Report	5× (suspension)	International Handball Hall, Chuzhou; Attendance: 100; Referees: Diop, Faye (SEN)

==== 19th place game ====
23 August 2024; 09:00	Austria	27–32	South Korea	International Handball Hall, Chuzhou; Attendance: 100; Referees: Picard, Vauchez (FRA)
23 August 2024; 09:00	Polanszky 6	(12–15)	Lee Y. 9	International Handball Hall, Chuzhou; Attendance: 100; Referees: Picard, Vauchez (FRA)
23 August 2024; 09:00	1× (yellow card) 1× (suspension)	Report	4× (suspension)	International Handball Hall, Chuzhou; Attendance: 100; Referees: Picard, Vauchez (FRA)

==== 17th place game ====
23 August 2024; 11:15	Argentina	19–25	Romania	International Handball Hall, Chuzhou; Attendance: 100; Referees: Watson, Welin (SWE)
23 August 2024; 11:15	Molina 7	(12–12)	Niță 8	International Handball Hall, Chuzhou; Attendance: 100; Referees: Watson, Welin (SWE)
23 August 2024; 11:15	5× (suspension) 1× (red card)	Report	5× (suspension)	International Handball Hall, Chuzhou; Attendance: 100; Referees: Watson, Welin (SWE)

=== 13–16th place bracket ===
13–16th place semifinals
22 August
Sweden	33
China	27
22 August
Netherlands	25
Switzerland	26

13th place game
23 August
Sweden	27
Switzerland	25
15th place game
23 August
China	24
Netherlands	23

==== 13–16th place semifinals ====
22 August 2024; 13:30	Netherlands	25–26	Switzerland	International Handball Hall, Chuzhou; Attendance: 210; Referees: Kažanegra, Vujačić (MNE)
22 August 2024; 13:30	Portengen 7	(11–14)	Baumann 14	International Handball Hall, Chuzhou; Attendance: 210; Referees: Kažanegra, Vujačić (MNE)
22 August 2024; 13:30	4× (suspension)	Report	1× (suspension)	International Handball Hall, Chuzhou; Attendance: 210; Referees: Kažanegra, Vujačić (MNE)

22 August 2024; 15:45	Sweden	33–27	China	International Handball Hall, Chuzhou; Attendance: 2,005; Referees: Metalari, Nikolovski (MKD)
22 August 2024; 15:45	Huselius 5	(17–11)	Huang Z. 6	International Handball Hall, Chuzhou; Attendance: 2,005; Referees: Metalari, Nikolovski (MKD)
22 August 2024; 15:45	1× (yellow card) 1× (suspension)	Report	2× (suspension) 1× (red card)	International Handball Hall, Chuzhou; Attendance: 2,005; Referees: Metalari, Nikolovski (MKD)

==== 15th place game ====
23 August 2024; 13:30	China	24–23	Netherlands	Olympic Sports Center, Chuzhou; Attendance: 1,000; Referees: El Gahss, El Malwane (MAR)
23 August 2024; 13:30	Huang Z. 7	(13–15)	Schouten 6	Olympic Sports Center, Chuzhou; Attendance: 1,000; Referees: El Gahss, El Malwane (MAR)
23 August 2024; 13:30		Report	5× (suspension) 1× (red card)	Olympic Sports Center, Chuzhou; Attendance: 1,000; Referees: El Gahss, El Malwane (MAR)

==== 13th place game ====
23 August 2024; 15:45	Sweden	27–25	Switzerland	Olympic Sports Center, Chuzhou; Attendance: 300; Referees: Altmár, Horváth (HUN)
23 August 2024; 15:45	Huselius 7	(10–8)	Emmenegger 8	Olympic Sports Center, Chuzhou; Attendance: 300; Referees: Altmár, Horváth (HUN)
23 August 2024; 15:45	1× (yellow card) 3× (suspension)	Report	3× (suspension)	Olympic Sports Center, Chuzhou; Attendance: 300; Referees: Altmár, Horváth (HUN)

=== 9–12th place bracket ===
9–12th place semifinals
22 August
Montenegro	23
Norway	30
22 August
Brazil	24
Czechia	25

Ninth place game
23 August
Norway	24
Czechia	29
Eleventh place game
23 August
Montenegro	21
Brazil	28

==== 9–12th place semifinals ====
22 August 2024; 13:30	Montenegro	23–30	Norway	Olympic Sports Center, Chuzhou; Attendance: 150; Referees: Cheng, Zhou (CHN)
22 August 2024; 13:30	Mitrović 6	(13–16)	Haldorsson 8	Olympic Sports Center, Chuzhou; Attendance: 150; Referees: Cheng, Zhou (CHN)
22 August 2024; 13:30	2× (suspension)	Report	3× (suspension)	Olympic Sports Center, Chuzhou; Attendance: 150; Referees: Cheng, Zhou (CHN)

22 August 2024; 15:45	Brazil	24–25	Czechia	Olympic Sports Center, Chuzhou; Attendance: 200; Referees: El Gahss, El Malwane (MAR)
22 August 2024; 15:45	Nunes, Fúculo 4	(16–13)	Rampová 11	Olympic Sports Center, Chuzhou; Attendance: 200; Referees: El Gahss, El Malwane (MAR)
22 August 2024; 15:45	4× (suspension)	Report	3× (suspension)	Olympic Sports Center, Chuzhou; Attendance: 200; Referees: El Gahss, El Malwane (MAR)

==== Eleventh place game ====
23 August 2024; 13:30	Montenegro	21–28	Brazil	International Handball Hall, Chuzhou; Attendance: 100; Referees: Haggui, Haggui (TUN)
23 August 2024; 13:30	Ramusović 6	(10–10)	Souza 7	International Handball Hall, Chuzhou; Attendance: 100; Referees: Haggui, Haggui (TUN)
23 August 2024; 13:30	2× (suspension)	Report	3× (suspension)	International Handball Hall, Chuzhou; Attendance: 100; Referees: Haggui, Haggui (TUN)

==== Ninth place game ====
23 August 2024; 15:45	Norway	24–29	Czechia	International Handball Hall, Chuzhou; Attendance: 300; Referees: Metalari, Nikolovski (MKD)
23 August 2024; 15:45	Breen 5	(10–15)	Vrbková 6	International Handball Hall, Chuzhou; Attendance: 300; Referees: Metalari, Nikolovski (MKD)
23 August 2024; 15:45	1× (yellow card)	Report	1× (suspension)	International Handball Hall, Chuzhou; Attendance: 300; Referees: Metalari, Nikolovski (MKD)

== Knockout stage ==
=== Bracket ===
Championship bracket

Quarter-finals
22 August
Croatia	20
Denmark	25
22 August
France	25
Germany	23
22 August
Hungary	29
Serbia	24
22 August
Spain	32
Japan	23

Semi-finals
23 August
Denmark	21
France	20
23 August
Hungary	16
Spain	19

Final
25 August
Denmark	22
Spain	23
Third place
25 August
France	24
Hungary	25

5–8th place bracket

5–8th place semifinals
23 August
Croatia	23
Germany	26
23 August
Serbia	21
Japan	20

Fifth place game
25 August
Germany	28
Serbia	23
Seventh place game
25 August
Croatia	26 (4)
Japan	26 (3)

=== Quarterfinals ===
22 August 2024; 18:15	Hungary	29–24	Serbia	Olympic Sports Center, Chuzhou; Attendance: 400; Referees: Hansen, Jensen (DEN)
22 August 2024; 18:15	Fazekas 9	(16–11)	Radović 5	Olympic Sports Center, Chuzhou; Attendance: 400; Referees: Hansen, Jensen (DEN)
22 August 2024; 18:15	2× (suspension)	Report	4× (suspension)	Olympic Sports Center, Chuzhou; Attendance: 400; Referees: Hansen, Jensen (DEN)

22 August 2024; 18:15	Croatia	20–25	Denmark	International Handball Hall, Chuzhou; Attendance: 300; Referees: Godoy, Magalhães (BRA)
22 August 2024; 18:15	Fratnik 9	(11–12)	Jensen 5	International Handball Hall, Chuzhou; Attendance: 300; Referees: Godoy, Magalhães (BRA)
22 August 2024; 18:15	1× (yellow card) 4× (suspension)	Report	2× (suspension)	International Handball Hall, Chuzhou; Attendance: 300; Referees: Godoy, Magalhães (BRA)

22 August 2024; 20:45	Spain	32–23	Japan	Olympic Sports Center, Chuzhou; Attendance: 500; Referees: Al-Enezi, Al-Naseem (KUW)
22 August 2024; 20:45	Regordan, B. Rodríguez 7	(17–11)	Matsumoto 6	Olympic Sports Center, Chuzhou; Attendance: 500; Referees: Al-Enezi, Al-Naseem (KUW)
22 August 2024; 20:45	1× (suspension)	Report		Olympic Sports Center, Chuzhou; Attendance: 500; Referees: Al-Enezi, Al-Naseem (KUW)

22 August 2024; 20:45	France	25–23	Germany	International Handball Hall, Chuzhou; Attendance: 300; Referees: El-Beltagy, Mahmoud (EGY)
22 August 2024; 20:45	Kingue 6	(15–10)	Ott 7	International Handball Hall, Chuzhou; Attendance: 300; Referees: El-Beltagy, Mahmoud (EGY)
22 August 2024; 20:45	1× (suspension)	Report		International Handball Hall, Chuzhou; Attendance: 300; Referees: El-Beltagy, Mahmoud (EGY)

=== 5–8th place semifinals ===
23 August 2024; 18:15	Croatia	23–26	Germany	Olympic Sports Center, Chuzhou; Attendance: 600; Referees: Araújo, Perdomo (URU)
23 August 2024; 18:15	Vuković 8	(10–15)	Bornhardt, Tucholke 5	Olympic Sports Center, Chuzhou; Attendance: 600; Referees: Araújo, Perdomo (URU)
23 August 2024; 18:15	1× (suspension)	Report	3× (suspension)	Olympic Sports Center, Chuzhou; Attendance: 600; Referees: Araújo, Perdomo (URU)

23 August 2024; 20:45	Serbia	21–20	Japan	Olympic Sports Center, Chuzhou; Attendance: 1,000; Referees: Fremstad, Jørstad (NOR)
23 August 2024; 20:45	Nedeljković 8	(14–7)	Oyama, Samo 5	Olympic Sports Center, Chuzhou; Attendance: 1,000; Referees: Fremstad, Jørstad (NOR)
23 August 2024; 20:45	1× (suspension)	Report	4× (suspension)	Olympic Sports Center, Chuzhou; Attendance: 1,000; Referees: Fremstad, Jørstad (NOR)

=== Semifinals ===
23 August 2024; 18:15	Denmark	21–20	France	International Handball Hall, Chuzhou; Attendance: 500; Referees: Correa, Conberse (ARG)
23 August 2024; 18:15	Plougstrup 8	(7–11)	Injai 4	International Handball Hall, Chuzhou; Attendance: 500; Referees: Correa, Conberse (ARG)
23 August 2024; 18:15	1× (yellow card) 2× (suspension)	Report	3× (suspension) 1× (red card)	International Handball Hall, Chuzhou; Attendance: 500; Referees: Correa, Conberse (ARG)

23 August 2024; 20:45	Hungary	16–19	Spain	International Handball Hall, Chuzhou; Attendance: 300; Referees: Bolic, Hurich (AUT)
23 August 2024; 20:45	Fazekas 5	(7–12)	Regordan, B. Rodríguez 6	International Handball Hall, Chuzhou; Attendance: 300; Referees: Bolic, Hurich (AUT)
23 August 2024; 20:45	4× (suspension)	Report	2× (suspension)	International Handball Hall, Chuzhou; Attendance: 300; Referees: Bolic, Hurich (AUT)

=== Seventh place game ===
25 August 2024
10:30
Croatia
30–29
Japan
International Handball Hall, Chuzhou
Attendance: 300
Referees: Ismoilov, Ismoilov (UZB)
Vuković 6
(12–14)
Matsumoto, Nakamura 8
1× (yellow card) 1× (suspension) 1× (red card)
Report
4× (suspension)

FT: 26–26 Pen: 4–3

=== Fifth place game ===
25 August 2024; 13:00	Germany	28–23	Serbia	International Handball Hall, Chuzhou; Attendance: 1,000; Referees: Cheng, Zhou (CHN)
25 August 2024; 13:00	Rohr, Ott 8	(15–10)	Radović 5	International Handball Hall, Chuzhou; Attendance: 1,000; Referees: Cheng, Zhou (CHN)
25 August 2024; 13:00	1× (yellow card) 2× (suspension)	Report	2× (suspension)	International Handball Hall, Chuzhou; Attendance: 1,000; Referees: Cheng, Zhou (CHN)

=== Third place game ===
25 August 2024; 15:30	France	24–25	Hungary	International Handball Hall, Chuzhou; Attendance: 4,000; Referees: Kažanegra, Vujačić (MNE)
25 August 2024; 15:30	Kingue 5	(13–16)	Keceli-Mészáros, Kriston 5	International Handball Hall, Chuzhou; Attendance: 4,000; Referees: Kažanegra, Vujačić (MNE)
25 August 2024; 15:30	2× (suspension)	Report	4× (suspension)	International Handball Hall, Chuzhou; Attendance: 4,000; Referees: Kažanegra, Vujačić (MNE)

=== Final ===
25 August 2024; 18:00	Denmark	22–23	Spain	International Handball Hall, Chuzhou; Attendance: 6,003; Referees: Altmár, Horváth (HUN)
25 August 2024; 18:00	Plougstrup 7	(11–9)	B. Rodríguez 8	International Handball Hall, Chuzhou; Attendance: 6,003; Referees: Altmár, Horváth (HUN)
25 August 2024; 18:00	1× (yellow card) 2× (suspension)	Report	1× (yellow card) 3× (suspension)	International Handball Hall, Chuzhou; Attendance: 6,003; Referees: Altmár, Horváth (HUN)

== Final ranking ==
Rank	Team
1st place, gold medalist(s)	Spain
2nd place, silver medalist(s)	Denmark
3rd place, bronze medalist(s)	Hungary
4	France
5	Germany
6	Serbia
7	Croatia
8	Japan
9	Czech Republic
10	Norway
11	Brazil
12	Montenegro
13	Sweden
14	Switzerland
15	China
16	Netherlands
17	Romania
18	Argentina
19	South Korea
20	Austria
21	Egypt
22	Chinese Taipei
23	Kosovo
24	Nigeria
25	Iceland
26	Angola
27	Kazakhstan
28	India
29	Chile
30	Guinea
31	Canada
32	Greenland

== Statistics and awards ==
=== Top goalscorers ===
Rank	Name	Goals	Shots	%
1	(Hungary) Virág Fazekas	54	81	67
2	(Germany) Marlene Tucholke	47	70	67
3	(Japan) Yume Matsumoto	46	77	60
4	(Switzerland) Era Baumann	45	54	83
5	(Chinese Taipei) Lin Ching	43	85	51
5	(Serbia) Mia Nedeljković	43	61	70
5	(Croatia) Ivana Fratnik	43	63	68
8	(Croatia) Katja Vuković	42	60	70
8	(Kosovo) Diona Dresh	42	70	60
8	(Argentina) Helena Molina	42	75	56
8	(Denmark) Anne Plougstrup	42	78	54
8	(Greenland) Madeline Bjørnestad	42	81	52

Source: IHF

=== Top goalkeepers ===
Rank	Name	%	Saves	Shots
1	(Norway) Leah Isabell Langaard	46	43	94
2	(Japan) Hana Osaki	45	15	33
2	(Netherlands) Cindy van Horssen	45	14	31
4	(Denmark) Zenia Madsen	44	41	93
5	(Kosovo) Lejla Hyseni	41	52	126
6	(Romania) Ioana Niță	40	21	52
7	(Netherlands) Anne de Boer	39	88	223
7	(Brazil) Sophia Ludwig	39	55	141
7	(Hungary) Gréta Majoros	39	50	129
10	(France) Romane Gindro	38	10	26
10	(France) Léane Gonzalez	38	57	149
10	(Switzerland) Seraina Kuratli	38	79	207
10	(Iceland) Ingibjørg Lovisa Hauksdóttir	38	14	37
10	(Argentina) Lola Nuñez	38	63	168

Source: IHF

=== All-Star Team ===
The all-star team was announced on 25 August 2024.

Position	Player
Goalkeeper	(Denmark) Freja Nielsen / (Denmark) Zenia Nielsen
Right wing	(France) Dawiya Abdou
Right back	(Hungary) Virág Fazekas
Centre back	(Spain) Marta Regordan
Left back	(Denmark) Anne Plougstrup
Left wing	(Switzerland) Era Baumann
Pivot	(Germany) Aylin Bornhardt
MVP	(Spain) Belén Rodríguez

== See also ==
- 2024 Women's Junior World Handball Championship
