= Andrea Nørklit =

Danish handball player (born 2005)

Personal information
- Full name: Andrea Nørklit Jørgensen
- Nationality: Danish
- Born: 25 August 2006 (age 20) Gentofte, Denmark
- Height: 1.84 m (6 ft 0 in)

Sport
- Sport: Handball
- Position: Goalkeeper
- Current club: Odense Håndbold
- Number: 5

Youth career
- Years: Team
- 2023-2025: Gudme HK

Senior clubs
- Years: Team
- 2025-: Odense Håndbold
Medal record
Youth World Championship
Silver medal – second place	2023 Montenegro
Junior European Championship
Bronze medal – third place	2025 Montenegro

Andrea Nørklit Jørgensen (born 25 August 2006) is a Danish handball player for Odense Håndbold in the Damehåndboldligaen.

Nørklit also represented the Danish youth national team at the 2023 European Women's U-17 Handball Championship in Montenegro. At the tournament, Nørklit was awarded Most Valuable Player. She also participated at the 2025 European Women's U-19 Handball Championship in Montenegro, winning bronze.

Since the 2025–26 season, she has been part of the league squad in Odense Håndbold, assisting Yara ten Holte following Althea Reinhardt's injury. In November 2025, she was also part of the Danish national team's development squad along with seven other players.

== Personal life ==
She is the daughter of former National team goalkeeper Peter Nørklit. Her cousin, Sarah Nørklit, is also a handball goalkeeper.

== Achievements ==
- Youth World Championship:
  - Silver Medalist: 2022
- Junior European Championship:
  - Silver Medalist: 2023

== Individual awards ==
- Most Valuable Player of the EHF European Under-17 Championship: 2023
- 2025-26 Kvindeligaen talent of the year
