= 2023 European Women's U-17 Handball Championship Qualification tournament =

Tournament details
- Host country: Serbia
- Venue: 1 (in 1 host city)
- Dates: 22–25 November
- Teams: 4 (from 1 confederation)

Final positions
- Champions: Serbia
- Runners-up: Iceland
- Third place: Slovenia
- Fourth place: Slovakia

Tournament statistics
- Matches played: 6
- Goals scored: 299 (49.83 per match)
- Attendance: 2,400 (400 per match)
- Top scorers: (Slovakia) Dorota Bačenková (23 goals)

The 2023 European Women's U-17 Handball Championship Qualification tournament was an event which was held in Belgrade, Serbia from 22 to 25 November 2021 to decide the final qualifier for the 2023 European Women's U-17 Handball Championship.

Serbia won the qualifier and advanced to the 2023 European Women's U-17 Handball Championship. After Russia was disqualified due to its invasion of Ukraine, Iceland, by finishing second, also qualified for the championship.

== Format ==
Four teams play each other in a round robin format where the group winners would qualify for the 2023 European Women's U-17 Handball Championship.

== Teams ==
| Team | Qualification |
|---|---|
| Austria (Note: Austria withdrew from the tournament due to travel restrictions measures imposed by Austrian authorities due to COVID-19.) | Finished 14th at the 2021 European Championship. |
| Slovakia | Finished 15th at the 2021 European Championship. |
| Slovenia | Finished 16th at the 2021 European Championship. |
| Serbia | Host. Losing finalist in the 2021 EHF Championship. |
| Iceland | Losing finalist in the 2021 EHF Championship. |

== Preliminary round ==
All times are local (UTC+2).

=== Group A ===
| Pos | Team | Pld | W | D | L | GF | GA | GD | Pts | Qualification |
|---|---|---|---|---|---|---|---|---|---|---|
| 1 | Serbia (H) | 3 | 3 | 0 | 0 | 88 | 62 | +26 | 6 | Qualification for the European Championship |
| 2 | Iceland (Note: Replaced Russia after they were disqualified due to the war in Ukraine.) | 3 | 2 | 0 | 1 | 73 | 78 | −5 | 4 | Qualification for the European Championship |
| 3 | Slovenia | 3 | 1 | 0 | 2 | 69 | 74 | −5 | 2 | |
| 4 | Slovakia | 3 | 0 | 0 | 3 | 69 | 85 | −16 | 0 | |

Source: EHF
Rules for classification: 1) points; 2) head-to-head points; 3) head-to-head goal difference; 4) head-to-head number of goals scored; 5) goal difference.
(H) Hosts

| 22 November 2021; 15:30 | Slovenia | 21–24 | Iceland | Sports Centre Voždovac, Belgrade; Attendance: 200; Referees: Ilievski, Ilievski (MKD) |
| 22 November 2021; 15:30 | Ocepek 5 | (9–9) | Ágústsdóttir 8 | Sports Centre Voždovac, Belgrade; Attendance: 200; Referees: Ilievski, Ilievski (MKD) |
| 22 November 2021; 15:30 | 2× (yellow card) 5× (suspension) | Report | 3× (yellow card) 2× (suspension) | Sports Centre Voždovac, Belgrade; Attendance: 200; Referees: Ilievski, Ilievski (MKD) |

| 22 November 2021; 18:00 | Slovakia | 20–30 | Serbia | Sports Centre Voždovac, Belgrade; Attendance: 600; Referees: Antașev, Musatov (RUS) |
| 22 November 2021; 18:00 | Šalatová 6 | (10–16) | Ćetković, Cvetković 6 | Sports Centre Voždovac, Belgrade; Attendance: 600; Referees: Antașev, Musatov (RUS) |
| 22 November 2021; 18:00 | 6× (suspension) | Report | 1× (yellow card) 5× (suspension) 1× (red card) | Sports Centre Voždovac, Belgrade; Attendance: 600; Referees: Antașev, Musatov (RUS) |

| 23 November 2021; 15:30 | Iceland | 29–26 | Slovakia | Sports Centre Voždovac, Belgrade; Attendance: 100; Referees: Ilievski, Ilievski (MKD) |
| 23 November 2021; 15:30 | Þorkelsdóttir 9 | (14–15) | Bačenková 11 | Sports Centre Voždovac, Belgrade; Attendance: 100; Referees: Ilievski, Ilievski (MKD) |
| 23 November 2021; 15:30 | 1× (yellow card) 3× (suspension) | Report | 1× (yellow card) 3× (suspension) | Sports Centre Voždovac, Belgrade; Attendance: 100; Referees: Ilievski, Ilievski (MKD) |

| 23 November 2021; 18:00 | Serbia | 27–22 | Slovenia | Sports Centre Voždovac, Belgrade; Attendance: 600; Referees: Antașev, Musatov (RUS) |
| 23 November 2021; 18:00 | Ćetković 7 | (13-6) | Zulić 9 | Sports Centre Voždovac, Belgrade; Attendance: 600; Referees: Antașev, Musatov (RUS) |
| 23 November 2021; 18:00 | 1× (yellow card) 2× (suspension) | Report | 2× (suspension) | Sports Centre Voždovac, Belgrade; Attendance: 600; Referees: Antașev, Musatov (RUS) |

| 25 November 2021; 15:30 | Slovakia | 23–26 | Slovenia | Sports Centre Voždovac, Belgrade; Attendance: 100; Referees: Antașev, Musatov (RUS) |
| 25 November 2021; 15:30 | Bačenková 10 | (10–12) | Kolobarić 8 | Sports Centre Voždovac, Belgrade; Attendance: 100; Referees: Antașev, Musatov (RUS) |
| 25 November 2021; 15:30 | 1× (yellow card) 3× (suspension) | Report | 1× (yellow card) 1× (suspension) | Sports Centre Voždovac, Belgrade; Attendance: 100; Referees: Antașev, Musatov (RUS) |

| 25 November 2021; 18:00 | Serbia | 31–20 | Iceland | Sports Centre Voždovac, Belgrade; Attendance: 800; Referees: Ilievski, Ilievski (MKD) |
| 25 November 2021; 18:00 | Ćetković 7 | (15–7) | Ágústsdóttir, Jóhannsdóttir 4 | Sports Centre Voždovac, Belgrade; Attendance: 800; Referees: Ilievski, Ilievski (MKD) |
| 25 November 2021; 18:00 | 2× (yellow card) 4× (suspension) | Report | 2× (yellow card) 1× (suspension) | Sports Centre Voždovac, Belgrade; Attendance: 800; Referees: Ilievski, Ilievski (MKD) |

== See also ==
- 2023 European Women's U-19 Handball Championship
- 2023 European Women's U-17 Handball Championship
