= Peter Nørklit =

Danish handball player (born 1971)

Personal information
- Full name: Peter Nørklit Larsen
- Nationality: Danish (Denmark)
- Born: 13 February 1971 (age 55) Glostrup, Denmark
- Height: 188 cm (74 in)

Sport
- Sport: Handball
- Position: Goalkeeper
- Current club: HØJ (GK Coach)
- Number: 1

Senior clubs
- Years: Team
- –1998: Virum-Sorgenfri HK
- 1998–2000: Portland San Antonio
- 2000–2003: BM Altea
- 2003–2010: FCK Håndbold
- 2010: AG København
- 2010–2014: Nordsjælland Håndbold
- 2014–2019: HØJ Håndbold
National team
Years	Team	Apps	(Gls)
1994–2006	Denmark	131	(1)

Teams managed
- 2019–: HØJ Håndbold (GK)
- 2022–: Denmark women's youth (GK)
- Updated on 28 December 2024

Peter Nørklit (born 13 February 1971) is a Danish former handballer and current handball coach.

== Career ==
He played for the Spanish clubs Portland San Antonio and BM Altea, and Danish sides FCK Håndbold, Nordsjælland Håndbold and HØJ Håndbold. In 2008 he won the Danish Championship with FC Copenhagen. In 1998-99 he won the Spanish Cup with Portland San Antonio and the year after he won the 1999-2000 EHF Cup Winners' Cup.

During the 1990s and the beginning of the 2000s, Nørklit was the first choice as goalkeeper of the Danish national handball team playing 131 national team matches. He was then replaced by Kasper Hvidt.

He retired in 2019 at the age of 48, after 5 seasons at HØJ Håndbold. Afterwards he continued as a coach at the club.

In 2022 he became the goalkeeping coach for the Danish Women's Youth Teams.

In an addition to handball, he has worked as a high school teacher in Gentofte, teaching math and sports.

== Private life ==
He is the father of fellow handball player Andrea Nørklit Jørgensen. His niece, Sarah Nørklit, is also a handball goalkeeper for HØJ Elite.
