= France women's national youth handball team =

France

Information
- Association: Fédération Française de Handball
- Coach: Olivier De Lafuente

Colours
1st	2nd

Results

Youth Olympic Games
- Appearances: None

IHF U-18 World Championship
- Appearances: 10 (First in 2006)
- Best result: 4th Place )2006, 2008, 2010=

European Championship
- Appearances: 9 (First in 1992)
- Best result: (gold) 1st (2007, 2023)
- Last updated on Unknown.

The France women's youth national handball team is the national under–18 Handball team of the France.

Controlled by the French Handball Federation it represents the country in international matches. It competes in the IHF U18 Handball World Championship (called the Women's Youth (U18) World Championship) and the European U-17 Handball Championship (also called the W17 EHF EURO).

The team has won the W17 EHF EURO twice (in 2007 and 2023) and won gold at the European Youth Olympic Festival twice (in 2019 and 2023).

The current head coach of the team is Olivier De Lafuente.

The team is referred as the "U18" and "U18F".

== Achievements ==
=== Championships ===
European U-17 Championship:

- Winners: 2007 and 2023
- 3rd place: 2005 and 2019

== History ==
=== Youth Olympic Games ===
Champions Runners up Third place Fourth place

Youth Olympic Games record
Year	Round	Position	GP	W	D	L	GS	GA	GD
(Singapore) 2010	Didn't Qualify								
(China) 2014	Didn't Qualify								
(Argentina) 2018	No Handball Event								
(Senegal) 2022	No Handball Event								
Total	0 / 2	0 Titles							

=== IHF World Championship ===
Champions Runners up Third place Fourth place

IHF Youth World Championship record
Year	Round	Position	GP	W	D	L	GS	GA	GD
(Canada) 2006	Semifinals	4th							
(Slovakia) 2008	Semifinals	4th							
(Dominican Republic) 2010	Semifinals	4th							
(Montenegro) 2012	Quarterfinals	7th							
(North Macedonia) 2014	Eightfinals	16th							
(Slovakia) 2016	Quarterfinals	6th							
(Poland) 2018	Eightfinals	10th							
(Croatia) 2020	Cancelled								
(Georgia (country)) 2022	Quarterfinals	6th							
(China) 2024	Semifinals	4th							
(Romania) 2026	Main round	10th							
Total	10/ 10	0 Titles							

=== European Championship ===
Champions Runners up Third place Fourth place

European Championship record
Year	Round	Position	GP	W	D	L	GS	GA	GD
(Hungary) 1992	Didn't Qualify								
(Lithuania) 1994	Didn't Qualify								
(Austria) 1997	Didn't Qualify								
(Germany) 1999	Didn't Qualify								
(Turkey) 2001	Didn't Qualify								
(Russia) 2003	Didn't Qualify								
(Austria) 2005	Semifinals	Third							
(Slovakia) 2007	Final	Champions							
(Serbia) 2009	Semifinals	4th							
(Czech Republic) 2011	Quarterfinals	5th							
(Poland) 2013	First Round	11th							
(North Macedonia) 2015	Quarterfinals	7th							
(Slovakia) 2017	Semifinals	4th							
(Slovenia) 2019	Semifinals	Third							
(Montenegro) 2021	First Round	11th							
(Montenegro) 2023	Final	Champions	7	6	0	1	193	149	44
Total	9 / 14	2 Titles							

== Winning rosters ==
=== 2023 Women's U-17 European Handball Championship ===
Goalkeepers

- Léane Gonzalez (Villers, N2),
- Maëlle Landriau (Tournefeuille N2)

Left Wingers

- Liyah Naal (Noisy-le-Grand HB reserve team, N2),
- Corentine Senant (Landi Lampaul, N2)

Right Wingers

- Dawlya Abdou (Bruguières, N1)
- Blandine Gros (Bordes, N1)

Line players

- Jone Arotçarena-Rosas (Côte Basque, N1)
- Eléa Ferdilus (Yutz N1)
- Lalie Lambet (Sambre Avesnois HB, D2)

Left Backs

- Prunelle Kingue (Montpellier N1)

Centre Backs

- Julilove Andon (Paris 92 reserve team, N2)
- Mélissa Chantelly (Mérignac HB reserve team, N1)
- Claire Koestner (Metz HB reserve team, N1)

Right Backs

- Emma Bureu-Cruz (Bordes N1)
- Zeina Injai (Stella Saint-Maur reserve team N1)
- Élise Ollivier (Brest Bretagne HB reserve team, N1)

=== 2007 Women's U-17 European Handball Championship ===
Goalkeepers

- Sonia Bonche
- Pauline Leythienne

Left Wingers

- Marie Jaubert
- Christelle Manga
- Estelle Nze Minko
- Martine Ringayen

Right Wingers

- Elodie Boyer
- Océane Feroussier

Line players

- Laura Ceccaldi
- Eva Turpin
- Isaure Vigner

Centre Backs

- Marlène Guillon

Left Backs

- Céline Blard
- Gnonsiane Niombla

Right Backs

- Koumba Cisse
- Marie Prudhomme

== Individual awards ==
=== 2023 Women's U-17 European Handball Championship ===
All-Star Team:

- Center Back: Mélissa Chantelly

=== 2007 Women's U-17 European Handball Championship ===
All-Star Team:

- Left winger: Martine Ringayen
- Left back: Gnonsiane Niombla
