= Serbia women's national youth handball team =

Serbia

Information
- Association: Handball Federation of Serbia
- Coach: Vesna Bojković

Colours
1st	2nd

Results

IHF U-18 World Championship
- Appearances: 3 (First in 20)
- Best result: 2nd (2008)
- Last updated on Unknown.

The Serbia women's youth national handball team is the national under-17 handball team of Serbia. Controlled by the Handball Federation of Serbia it represents the country in international matches.

== World Championship record ==
- 2008 – 2nd place
- 2024 – 6th place
- 2026 – 22nd place

== European Championship record ==
- 2007 - 5th place
- 2009 - 12th place
- 2017 - 16th place
- 2023 - 6th place
- 2025 - 10th place
