= Czech Republic women's national youth handball team =

Czech Republic

Information
- Association: Czech Handball Association
- Coach: Petra Vítková

Colours
1st	2nd

Results

IHF U-18 World Championship
- Appearances: 4 (First in 2012)
- Best result: 9th (2024)
- Last updated on Unknown.

The Czech Republic women's youth national handball team is the national under-17 handball team of Czech Republic. Controlled by the Czech Handball Association it represents the country in international matches.

== World Championship record ==
- 2012 – 13th place
- 2022 – 22nd place
- 2024 – 9th place
- 2026 – 21st place
