= Switzerland women's national youth handball team =

Switzerland

Information
- Association: Swiss Handball Association
- Coach: Jürgen Fleischmann

Colours
| 1st | 2nd |

Results

IHF U-18 World Championship
- Appearances: 3 (First in 2022)
- Best result: 5th (2026)
- Last updated on Unknown.

The Switzerland women's youth national handball team is the national under-17 handball team of Switzerland. Controlled by the Swiss Handball Association it represents the country in international matches.

== World Championship record ==
- 2022 – 21st place
- 2024 – 14th place
- 2026 – 5th place
