= Era Baumann =

Swiss handball player

Personal information
- Full name: Era Baumann
- Nationality: Swiss
- Born: 10 April 2007 (age 19) Zurich, Switzerland
- Height: 1.72 m (5 ft 8 in)

Sport
- Sport: Handball
- Position: Left wing
- Current club: Viborg HK
- Number: 7

Senior clubs
- Years: Team
- 2022–2025: GC Amicitia Zürich
- 2025–: Viborg HK
National team
| Years | Team | Apps | (Gls) |
| 2024– | Switzerland | 20 | (23) |
- Updated on 14 September 2025

Era Baumann (born 10 April 2007) is a Swiss female handballer for Viborg HK in Denmark and the Swiss national team. She has previously played for GC Amicitia Zürich and TV Unterstrass in her youth years.

Baumann made her official debut on the Swiss national team on 13 April 2024, against Slovakia at the age of 16 years. She represented Switzerland for the first time at the 2024 European Women's Handball Championship in Switzerland, Hungary and Austria. She has also a strong record on the National youth team, participating at 2024 IHF Women's U18 Handball World Championship in China, where she also made it to the official All-Star team for left wing of the tournament.

In February 2025, she signed a three-year contract with Danish top tier Viborg HK.

== Individual awards ==
- All-Star left wing of the IHF Women's Youth Handball World Championship : 2024
