= Iva Mladenovska =

Macedonian handballer (born 2007)

Personal information
- Nationality: Macedonian
- Born: 14 January 2007 (age 19) Skopje, Macedonia
- Height: 1.80 m (5 ft 11 in)

Sport
- Sport: Handball
- Position: right back
- Current club: Borussia Dortmund
- Number: 19

Youth career
- Years: Team
- –: RK Kastratović
- –2020: ŽRK Alušovski

Senior clubs
- Years: Team
- 2022–2023: ŽRK Metalurg
- 2023–2025: Brest Bretagne Handball
- 2025–2026: ESBF Besançon
- 2026–: Borussia Dortmund
National team
Years	Team	Apps	(Gls)
2021–	North Macedonia	9	(12)
- Updated on 13 August 2025

Iva Mladenovska (born 14 January 2007) is a Macedonian female handballer for Borussia Dortmund in the Frauen-Bundesliga and the North Macedonia national team.

She represented the North Macedonia at the 2022 European Women's Handball Championship.
