= Katja Vuković =

Croatian handballer (born 2006)

Personal information
- Nationality: Croatian
- Born: 13 September 2006 (age 20) Zagreb, Croatia
- Height: 1.71 m (5 ft 7 in)

Sport
- Sport: Handball
- Position: Left winger
- Current club: RK Podravka Koprivnica
- Number: 4

Senior clubs
- Years: Team
- –2022: ŽRK Dugo Selo '55
- 2022–: RK Podravka Koprivnica
National team
Years	Team	Apps	(Gls)
2024–	Croatia	11	(10)
- Updated on 27 November 2025

Katja Vuković (born 13 September 2006) is a Croatian handballer for RK Podravka Koprivnica and the Croatian national team.

She represented Croatia at the 2024 European Women's Handball Championship.

She comes from Dugo Selo.
