= Denmark women's national youth handball team =

National under–17 handball team of Denmark

Denmark

Information
- Association: Danish Handball Federation
- Coach: Flemming Dam Larsen

Colours
1st	2nd

Results

Youth Olympic Games
- Appearances: 1 (First in 2010)
- Best result: (gold) Winner : 2010

IHF U-18 World Championship
- Appearances: 10 (First in 2006)
- Best result: (gold) Winner : 2006, 2012

European Championship
- Appearances: 11 (First in 1992)
- Best result: (gold) Winner : 2005, 2009, 2015
- Last updated on Unknown.

Denmark women's national youth handball team
Medal record

Representing Denmark

Handball

Women's Youth Olympic Championship
Gold medal – first place	2010	

World Women's Youth Championship
Gold medal – first place	2006	
Gold medal – first place	2012	
Silver medal – second place	2016	
Bronze medal – third place	2008	
Bronze medal – third place	2014	
Bronze medal – third place	2026	

European Women's Youth Championship
Gold medal – first place	2005	
Gold medal – first place	2009	
Gold medal – first place	2015	
Silver medal – second place	1992	
Silver medal – second place	2011	
Bronze medal – third place	1994	
Bronze medal – third place	2013	

European Open Women's Youth Championship
Gold medal – first place	2006	
Gold medal – first place	2010	
Silver medal – second place	2014	
Silver medal – second place	2016	

Women's European Youth Olympic Championship
Gold medal – first place	1997	
Gold medal – first place	1999	
Gold medal – first place	2013	
Silver medal – second place	2015	
Bronze medal – third place	2005	
Bronze medal – third place	2007	
Bronze medal – third place	2009	
Bronze medal – third place	2011	
Bronze medal – third place	2017	

The Denmark women's youth national handball team is the national under–17 handball team of Denmark. Controlled by the Danish Handball Federation, it represents Denmark in international matches.

== History ==
=== World Championship ===
Year	Round	Position	GP	W	D*	L	GS	GA	GD
Canada 2006	Final Round	1st	6	6	0	0	236	140	+96
Slovakia 2008	Semifinals	3rd	6	4	0	2	198	165	+33
Dominican Republic 2010	Quarterfinals	6th	7	4	0	3	172	155	+17
Montenegro 2012	Final Round	1st	7	6	1	0	222	162	+60
Macedonia 2014	Semifinals	3rd	9	6	1	1	301	201	+100
Slovakia 2016	Final Round	2nd	9	8	0	1	281	182	+99
Poland 2018	Quarterfinals	6th	7	5	0	2	192	151	+40
North Macedonia 2022	Final	2nd	8	6	0	2	287	249	+38
China 2024	Final Round	2nd	8	6	0	2	239	158	+81
Romania 2026	Semifinals	3rd	8	6	0	2	218	171	+47
Total	10/10	2 Titles	75	57	2	15	2346	1734	+612

=== Youth Olympic Games ===
Year	Round	Position	GP	W	D*	L	GS	GA	GD
Singapore 2010	Final Round	1st	4	4	0	0	139	70	+69
China 2014	Did not qualify								
Total	1/2	1 Title	4	4	0	0	139	70	+69

== Team ==
=== Coaching staff ===
Role	Name
Head coach	(Denmark) Heine Eriksen
Assistant coach	(Denmark) Mikkel Voigt Frederiksen
Team manager	(Denmark) Rie Schneider Kristensen
Goalkeeping coach	(Denmark) Gitte Sunesen
Physiotherapist	(Denmark) Morten Vanggaard Nielsen
