= 2025 European Women's U-17 Handball Championship qualification =

2025 Women's U-17 European Handball Championship qualification
Tournament details
- Host countries: Poland; Turkey
- Venues: 2 (in 2 host cities)
- Dates: 22–24 November
- Teams: 8 (from 1 confederation)

Tournament statistics
- Matches played: 12
- Goals scored: 696 (58 per match)
- Attendance: 2,465 (205 per match)
- Top scorer(s): (Israel) Liam Lulu (41 goals)

The 2025 Women's U-17 European Handball Championship qualification was held in Radzymin, Poland and Çankaya, Turkey from 22 to 24 November 2024 to decide the final four qualifiers for the 2025 European Women's U-17 Handball Championship in Montenegro.

Lithuania, Poland, Slovakia and Turkey advanced to the championship after finishing top two in both groups. The unsuccessful teams instead played in the 2025 Women's U-17 EHF Championship in Kosovo.

== Format ==
Eight teams are separated into two groups of four, played in a round robin format, where the top two from each group would qualify for the 2025 European Women's U-17 Handball Championship.

== Teams ==
The following teams participated:

- Finland
- Israel
- Italy
- Lithuania
- Poland
- Slovakia
- Turkey
- Ukraine

== Draw ==
The draw was held on 26 June 2024 in Vienna at 11:00 (CET).

Pot 1	Pot 2	Pot 3	Pot 4
Poland; Slovakia	Lithuania; Turkey	Finland; Italy	Israel; Ukraine

== Groups ==
=== Group A ===
Pos	Team	Pld	W	D	L	GF	GA	GD	Pts	Qualification
1	Poland	3	2	0	1	95	76	+19	4 (Note: Poland 34–25 Lithuania)	Final tournament
2	Lithuania	3	2	0	1	92	86	+6	4	Final tournament
3	Finland	3	1	0	2	96	103	−7	2 (Note: Finland 43–36 Israel)	
4	Israel	3	1	0	2	86	104	−18	2	

Source: EHF
Rules for classification: 1) points; 2) head-to-head points; 3) head-to-head goal difference; 4) head-to-head number of goals scored; 5) Goal difference.
Notes:

22 November 2024; 16:15	Lithuania	35–23	Israel	Radzyminski Osrodek Kultury i Sportu, Radzymin; Attendance: 100; Referees: Marton, Dane (HUN)
22 November 2024; 16:15	three players 7	(13–15)	Lulu 8	Radzyminski Osrodek Kultury i Sportu, Radzymin; Attendance: 100; Referees: Marton, Dane (HUN)
22 November 2024; 16:15	1× (yellow card) 3× (suspension) 1× (red card)	Report	4× (suspension)	Radzyminski Osrodek Kultury i Sportu, Radzymin; Attendance: 100; Referees: Marton, Dane (HUN)

22 November 2024; 18:30	Poland	35–24	Finland	Radzyminski Osrodek Kultury i Sportu, Radzymin; Attendance: 150; Referees: Schaad, Müller (SUI)
22 November 2024; 18:30	Purzynska 9	(20–13)	Karén 6	Radzyminski Osrodek Kultury i Sportu, Radzymin; Attendance: 150; Referees: Schaad, Müller (SUI)
22 November 2024; 18:30	1× (yellow card) 2× (suspension)	Report	2× (suspension)	Radzyminski Osrodek Kultury i Sportu, Radzymin; Attendance: 150; Referees: Schaad, Müller (SUI)

23 November 2024; 16:15	Finland	43–36	Israel	Radzyminski Osrodek Kultury i Sportu, Radzymin; Attendance: 100; Referees: Schaad, Müller (SUI)
23 November 2024; 16:15	Karén 16	(22–18)	Lulu 18	Radzyminski Osrodek Kultury i Sportu, Radzymin; Attendance: 100; Referees: Schaad, Müller (SUI)
23 November 2024; 16:15	7× (suspension)	Report	1× (yellow card) 11× (suspension)	Radzyminski Osrodek Kultury i Sportu, Radzymin; Attendance: 100; Referees: Schaad, Müller (SUI)

23 November 2024; 18:30	Poland	34–25	Lithuania	Radzyminski Osrodek Kultury i Sportu, Radzymin; Attendance: 250; Referees: Marton, Dane (HUN)
23 November 2024; 18:30	three players 6	(16–15)	Bartkute, Ustilaite 6	Radzyminski Osrodek Kultury i Sportu, Radzymin; Attendance: 250; Referees: Marton, Dane (HUN)
23 November 2024; 18:30	1× (yellow card) 2× (suspension)	Report	1× (yellow card) 7× (suspension)	Radzyminski Osrodek Kultury i Sportu, Radzymin; Attendance: 250; Referees: Marton, Dane (HUN)

24 November 2024; 14:15	Lithuania	32–29	Finland	Radzyminski Osrodek Kultury i Sportu, Radzymin; Attendance: 150; Referees: Schaad, Müller (SUI)
24 November 2024; 14:15	Bartkute 10	(19–13)	Saukkonen 9	Radzyminski Osrodek Kultury i Sportu, Radzymin; Attendance: 150; Referees: Schaad, Müller (SUI)
24 November 2024; 14:15	7× (suspension) 1× (red card)	Report	1× (yellow card) 3× (suspension)	Radzyminski Osrodek Kultury i Sportu, Radzymin; Attendance: 150; Referees: Schaad, Müller (SUI)

24 November 2024; 16:30	Israel	27–26	Poland	Radzyminski Osrodek Kultury i Sportu, Radzymin; Attendance: 300; Referees: Marton, Dane (HUN)
24 November 2024; 16:30	Lulu 15	(11–13)	Litwiniuk 6	Radzyminski Osrodek Kultury i Sportu, Radzymin; Attendance: 300; Referees: Marton, Dane (HUN)
24 November 2024; 16:30	4× (suspension)	Report	1× (yellow card) 2× (suspension)	Radzyminski Osrodek Kultury i Sportu, Radzymin; Attendance: 300; Referees: Marton, Dane (HUN)

=== Group B ===
Pos	Team	Pld	W	D	L	GF	GA	GD	Pts	Qualification
1	Slovakia	3	3	0	0	113	48	+65	6	Final tournament
2	Turkey (H)	3	2	0	1	79	83	−4	4	Final tournament
3	Italy	3	1	0	2	62	84	−22	2	
4	Ukraine	3	0	0	3	73	112	−39	0	

Source: EHF
Rules for classification: 1) points; 2) head-to-head points; 3) head-to-head goal difference; 4) head-to-head number of goals scored; 5) Goal difference.
(H) Hosts

22 November 2024; 15:30	Turkey	24–19	Italy	Dr Yasar Sevim Sport Hall, Çankaya; Attendance: 200; Referees: Pavicevic, Martinovic (MNE)
22 November 2024; 15:30	Karagözlü 6	(11–8)	Barbuscia 4	Dr Yasar Sevim Sport Hall, Çankaya; Attendance: 200; Referees: Pavicevic, Martinovic (MNE)
22 November 2024; 15:30	2× (suspension)	Report		Dr Yasar Sevim Sport Hall, Çankaya; Attendance: 200; Referees: Pavicevic, Martinovic (MNE)

22 November 2024; 17:45	Ukraine	18–44	Slovakia	Dr Yasar Sevim Sport Hall, Çankaya; Attendance: 150; Referees: Murariu, Paraschiv (ROU)
22 November 2024; 17:45	Ivanova 6	(10–22)	Sekácová 7	Dr Yasar Sevim Sport Hall, Çankaya; Attendance: 150; Referees: Murariu, Paraschiv (ROU)
22 November 2024; 17:45	1× (yellow card) 2× (suspension)	Report	1× (yellow card) 3× (suspension)	Dr Yasar Sevim Sport Hall, Çankaya; Attendance: 150; Referees: Murariu, Paraschiv (ROU)

23 November 2024; 13:45	Italy	32–26	Ukraine	Dr Yasar Sevim Sport Hall, Çankaya; Attendance: 200; Referees: Pavicevic, Martinovic (MNE)
23 November 2024; 13:45	Giovannini 8	(13–10)	Prokopets 8	Dr Yasar Sevim Sport Hall, Çankaya; Attendance: 200; Referees: Pavicevic, Martinovic (MNE)
23 November 2024; 13:45	6× (suspension)	Report	2× (suspension)	Dr Yasar Sevim Sport Hall, Çankaya; Attendance: 200; Referees: Pavicevic, Martinovic (MNE)

23 November 2024; 16:00	Slovakia	35–19	Turkey	Dr Yasar Sevim Sport Hall, Çankaya; Attendance: 380; Referees: Murariu, Paraschiv (ROU)
23 November 2024; 16:00	three players 5	(19–7)	Karagözlü 7	Dr Yasar Sevim Sport Hall, Çankaya; Attendance: 380; Referees: Murariu, Paraschiv (ROU)
23 November 2024; 16:00	1× (yellow card) 4× (suspension)	Report	1× (yellow card) 3× (suspension)	Dr Yasar Sevim Sport Hall, Çankaya; Attendance: 380; Referees: Murariu, Paraschiv (ROU)

24 November 2024; 12:45	Slovakia	34–11	Italy	Dr Yasar Sevim Sport Hall, Çankaya; Attendance: 200; Referees: Pavicevic, Martinovic (MNE)
24 November 2024; 12:45	three players 5	(15–6)	Magri, Nicolin 3	Dr Yasar Sevim Sport Hall, Çankaya; Attendance: 200; Referees: Pavicevic, Martinovic (MNE)
24 November 2024; 12:45	1× (suspension)	Report	7× (suspension)	Dr Yasar Sevim Sport Hall, Çankaya; Attendance: 200; Referees: Pavicevic, Martinovic (MNE)

24 November 2024; 15:00	Turkey	36–29	Ukraine	Dr Yasar Sevim Sport Hall, Çankaya; Attendance: 285; Referees: Murariu, Paraschiv (ROU)
24 November 2024; 15:00	three players 7	(17–13)	Nazarenko 9	Dr Yasar Sevim Sport Hall, Çankaya; Attendance: 285; Referees: Murariu, Paraschiv (ROU)
24 November 2024; 15:00		Report	3× (suspension)	Dr Yasar Sevim Sport Hall, Çankaya; Attendance: 285; Referees: Murariu, Paraschiv (ROU)

== See also ==
- 2025 European Women's U-17 Handball Championship
- 2025 European Women's U-19 Handball Championship
- 2025 Women's U-17 EHF Championship
- 2025 Women's U-19 EHF Championship
