= European Handball Federation =

Sporting association

European Handball Federation EHF
- Sport: Handball
- Other sports: Beach handball; Wheelchair handball
- Official website: eurohandball.com

History
- Year of formation: 17 November 1991; 34 years ago Berlin, Germany

Demographics
- Membership size: 52 Members (50 full, 2 associate)
- International federation: International Handball Federation (IHF)
- IHF member since: 1992

Governance
- President: Michael Wiederer
- Vice-President: Predrag Bošković

Secretariat
- Address: Hoffingergasse 18, 1120 Vienna
- Country: Austria
- Secretary General: Martin Hausleitner
- Official Language(s): English
- Number of staff: 69

Finance
- Sponsors: Infront Sports & Media; DAZN hummel Gerflor Group; Select; Sport Radar

The European Handball Federation (EHF) is the umbrella organisation for European handball. Founded on 17 November 1991, it is made of 50 member federations and two associated federations (England and Scotland), and is headquartered in Vienna, Austria.

== History ==
EHF was founded on 17 November 1991 in Berlin, Germany, although the first EHF Congress convened on 5 June 1992 and assigned EHF's headquarters to Vienna, Austria, from 1 September that year.

In 2012, the EHF Office celebrated 20 years since it first opened its doors. In the subsequent years, the number of member countries has expanded from the initial 29 to its current number of 50, after Kosovo was granted full membership at the EHF Congress in Dublin, Ireland, in September 2014. The EHF represents its members in the development of the sport both in terms of grassroots talent, as well as commercial growth. EHF-organised events such as the Men's and Women's European Handball Championships and the EHF Champions League represent major revenue contributors, while initiatives such as beach handball and handball at school expand the attraction of the sport.

=== After-effects of Russian invasion of Ukraine ===
After Russia launched the 2022 Russian invasion of Ukraine, the European Handball Federation in February 2022 suspended Russia and Belarus both in competitions for national teams and on club level. It suspended the national teams of Russia and Belarus as well as Russian and Belarusian clubs competing in European handball competitions. Referees, officials, and commission members from Russia and Belarus will not be called upon for future activities. And new organisers will be sought for the YAC 16 EHF Beach Handball EURO and the Qualifier Tournaments for the Beach Handball EURO 2023, which were to be held in Moscow. In addition, it refused to allow competitions to be held in Russia or Belarus. The Russian Handball Federation failed in its appeal against the decision to exclude Russia's teams from continental competition, which was rejected by the European Handball Federation Court of Handball.

== Presidents ==
| S. No. | Name | Tenure |
|---|---|---|
| 1 | (Sweden) Staffan Holmqvist | 17 November 1991 – 18 December 2004 |
| 2 | (Norway) Tor Lian | 18 December 2004 – 22 June 2012 |
| 3 | (France) Jean Brihault | 22 June 2012 – 17 November 2016 |
| 4 | (Austria) Michael Wiederer | 17 November 2016 – present |

== Secretaries general ==
| S. No. | Name | Tenure |
|---|---|---|
| 1 | (Austria) Michael Wiederer | 1 September 1992 – 17 November 2016 |
Post vacant from 17 November 2016 to 1 August 2017
| 2 | (Austria) Martin Hausleitner | 1 August 2017 – present |

== EHF Executive Committee ==
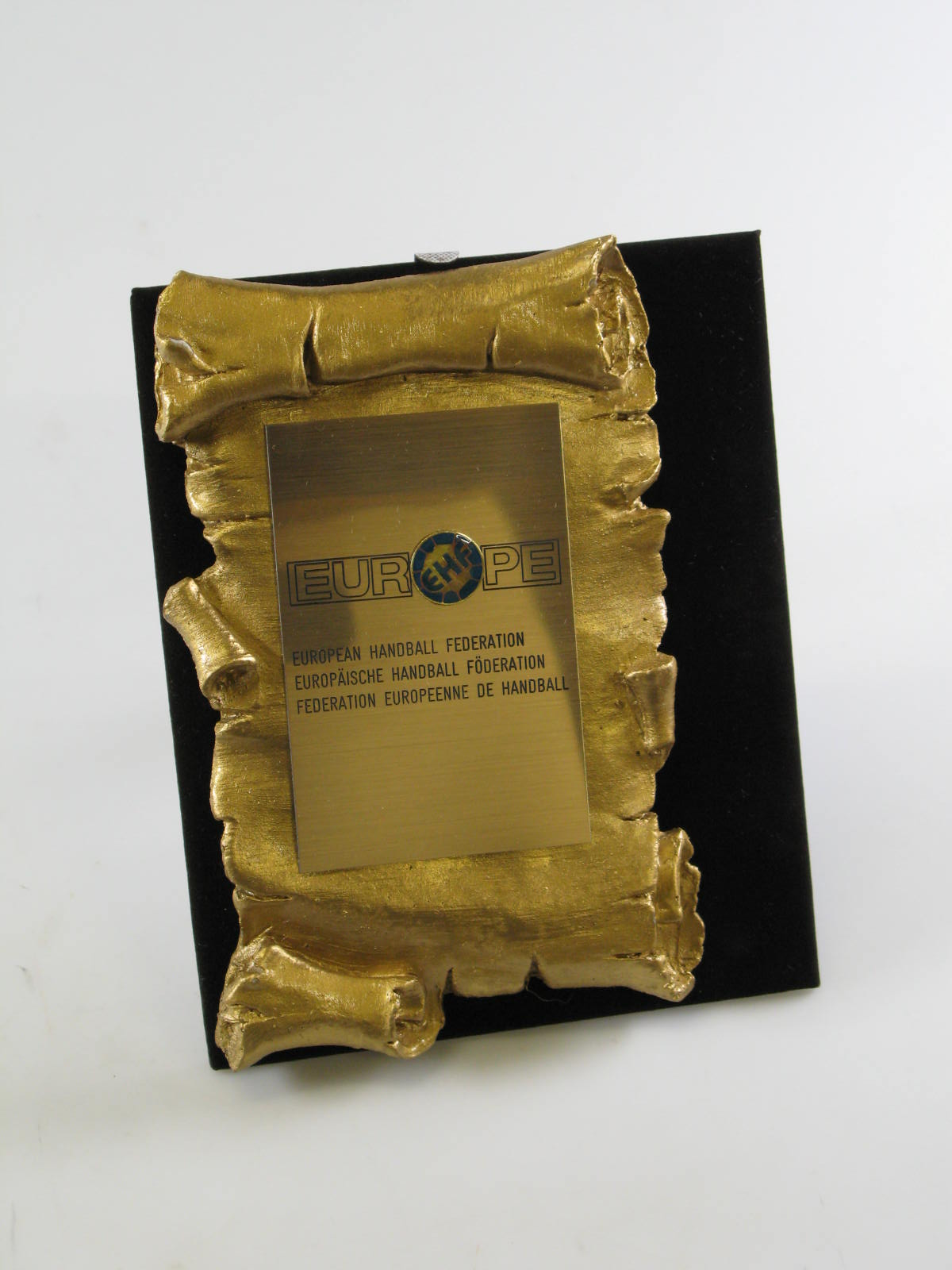
Plaquette EHF Europe

The following is the EHF Executive Committee for the term 2025 – 2029.

| Designation | Name |
|---|---|
| President | (Austria) Michael Wiederer |
| Vice-president | (Montenegro) Predrag Bošković |
| Vice-president Finances | (Denmark) Henrik La Cour Laursen |
| Chairman of Competitions Commission | (Serbia) Božidar Đurković |
| Chairman of Methods Commission | (Portugal) Pedro Sequeira |
| Chair of Beach Handball Commission | (Hungary) Gabriella Horváth |
| Executive Members | (Sweden) Stefan Lövgren |
| Executive Members | (Turkey) Mesut Çebi |
| Executive Members | (Netherlands) Tjark de Lange |
| Executive Members | (Norway) Randi Gustad |
| Additional Representative | (Norway) Bente Aksnes |
| Representative of Professional Handball Board | (Spain) Xavier O'Callaghan Ferrer |
| Representative of Women's Handball Board | (Portugal) Leonor Mallozzi |
| Representative of Nations Board | (Germany) Mark Schober |

== Competitions ==
Results history:

European championships

- European Men's Handball Championship
- EHF Euro Cup
- European Women's Handball Championship
- Women's EHF Euro Cup
- European Men's U-20 Handball Championship
- European Women's U-19 Handball Championship
- European Men's U-18 Handball Championship
- European Women's U-17 Handball Championship
- European Open Handball Championship
- European Men's Beach Handball Championship
- European Women's Beach Handball Championship
- EHF Challenge Trophy
- European Beach Handball Championship
- European Beach Handball Tour
- European U19 Beach Handball Championship
- European U17 Beach Handball Championship
- European Handball Men's 19 EHF Championship
- European Handball Women's 19 EHF Championship
- EHF Trophy
- Women's Handball European Challenge Championships
- Men's Handball European Challenge Championships
- EHF Nations' Cup – Defunct

Multi-sports events

- European Youth Olympic Festival

Men's club competitions

- EHF Champions League
- EHF European League (former EHF Cup)
- EHF Cup Winners' Cup (merged with the EHF Cup from the 2012–13 season)
- EHF European Cup (former EHF Challenge Cup and City Cup)
- European Beach Handball Tour
- EHF Beach Handball Champions Cup

Women's club competitions

- Women's EHF Champions League
- Women's EHF European League (former Women's EHF Cup)
- Women's EHF Cup Winners' Cup (merged with the Women's EHF Cup from the 2016–17 season)
- Women's EHF European Cup (former Women's EHF Challenge Cup and City Cup)
- European Beach Handball Tour
- EHF Beach Handball Champions Cup

Others

- European Wheelchair Handball Nations' Tournament
- European Open Handball Championship

== Medals ==
Last Update: 15 August 2023

1. European Men's Handball Championship (1994-2022) - 15 Editions
2. European Women's Handball Championship (1994-2022) - 15 Editions
3. European Men's U-20 Handball Championship (1996-2022) - 13 Editions
4. European Women's U-19 Handball Championship (1996-2023) - 14 Editions
5. European Men's U-18 Handball Championship (1992-2022) - 16 Editions
6. European Women's U-17 Handball Championship (1992-2023) - 16 Editions
7. European Men's Beach Handball Championship (2000-2023) - 13 Editions
8. European Women's Beach Handball Championship (2000-2023) - 13 Editions

| Rank | Nation | Gold | Silver | Bronze | Total |
|---|---|---|---|---|---|
| 1 | Denmark (DEN) | 19 | 16 | 17 | 52 |
| 2 | Russia (RUS) | 12 | 18 | 10 | 40 |
| 3 | Germany (GER) | 12 | 11 | 8 | 31 |
| 4 | Norway (NOR) | 12 | 9 | 7 | 28 |
| 5 | Spain (ESP) | 11 | 14 | 12 | 37 |
| 6 | Hungary (HUN) | 10 | 6 | 13 | 29 |
| 7 | France (FRA) | 9 | 2 | 10 | 21 |
| 8 | Croatia (CRO) | 8 | 10 | 8 | 26 |
| 9 | Sweden (SWE) | 8 | 7 | 5 | 20 |
| 10 | Romania (ROU) | 3 | 2 | 3 | 8 |
| 11 | Serbia (SRB) | 2 | 2 | 5 | 9 |
| 12 | Ukraine (UKR) | 2 | 2 | 2 | 6 |
| 13 | Portugal (POR) | 1 | 3 | 0 | 4 |
| 14 | Slovenia (SLO) | 1 | 2 | 3 | 6 |
| 15 | Belarus (BLR) | 1 | 1 | 1 | 3 |
| 15 | Iceland (ISL) | 1 | 1 | 1 | 3 |
| 17 | Poland (POL) | 1 | 1 | 0 | 2 |
| 18 | Italy (ITA) | 1 | 0 | 2 | 3 |
| 19 | Montenegro (MNE) | 1 | 0 | 1 | 2 |
| 20 | Netherlands (NED) | 0 | 4 | 3 | 7 |
| 21 | Czech Republic (CZE) | 0 | 2 | 0 | 2 |
| 22 | Turkey (TUR) | 0 | 1 | 2 | 3 |
| 23 | Lithuania (LTU) | 0 | 1 | 0 | 1 |
| 24 | Austria (AUT) | 0 | 0 | 2 | 2 |
| Totals (24 entries) | | 115 | 115 | 115 | 345 |

== Current title holders ==
=== Handball ===
| Competitions | Current champion | Title |
|---|---|---|
| European Men's Handball Championship | Denmark (2026) | 3rd |
| European Women's Handball Championship | Norway (2024) | 9th |
| European Men's Junior Handball Championship | Hungary (2026) | 1st |
| European Women's Junior Handball Championship | Germany (2025) | 1st |
| European Men's Youth Handball Championship | Germany (2026) | 4th |
| European Women's Youth Handball Championship | Slovakia (2025) | 1st |
| European Men's Open Handball Championship | Faroe Islands (2019) | 1st |
| European Women's Open Handball Championship | Hungary (2018) | 1st |
| EHF Women's Challenge Trophy | Bosnia and Herzegovina (2018) | 3rd |
| European Youth Olympic Festival (Men's Event) | Iceland (2025) | 1st |
| European Youth Olympic Festival (Women's Event) | Germany (2025) | 1st |

=== Beach handball ===
| Competitions | Current champion | Title |
|---|---|---|
| European Men's Beach Handball Championship | Germany (2025) | 1st |
| European Women's Beach Handball Championship | Spain (2025) | 1st |
| European Men's Youth Beach Handball Championship | Sweden (2021) | 1st |
| European Women's Youth Beach Handball Championship | Hungary (2021) | 8th |

=== Wheelchair handball ===
| Competitions | Current champion | Title |
|---|---|---|
| European Wheelchair Handball Nations' Tournament | Portugal (2025) | 3rd |

=== Club ===
| Competitions | Current champion | Title |
|---|---|---|
| EHF Champions League | (Spain) FC Barcelona (2025–26) | 13th |
| EHF European League | (Germany) MT Melsungen (2025–26) | 1st |
| EHF European Cup | (North Macedonia) GRK Ohrid (2025–26) | 1st |
| Women's EHF Champions League | (France) Metz Handball (2025–26) | 1st |
| Women's EHF European League | (France) JDA Bourgogne Dijon HB (2025–26) | 1st |
| Women's EHF European Cup | (Spain) Mecalia Atlético Guardés (2025–26) | 1st |

== Affiliated Members ==
- Albania
- Andorra
- Armenia
- Austria
- Azerbaijan
- Belarus
- Belgium
- Bosnia and Herzegovina
- Bulgaria
- Croatia
- Cyprus
- Czech Republic
- Denmark
- Estonia
- Faroe Islands
- Finland
- France
- (Georgia (country)) Georgia
- Germany
- (United Kingdom) Great Britain
- Greece
- Hungary
- Iceland
- (Republic of Ireland) Ireland
- Israel
- Italy
- Kosovo
- Latvia
- Liechtenstein
- Lithuania
- Luxembourg
- Malta
- Moldova
- Monaco
- Montenegro
- Netherlands
- North Macedonia
- Norway
- Poland
- Portugal
- Romania
- Russia
- Serbia
- Slovakia
- Slovenia
- Spain
- Sweden
- Switzerland
- Turkey
- Ukraine

Associated federations

- England
- Scotland

== EHF European Championships ==
The European Men's Handball Championship and European Women's Handball Championship are the flagship national team events of the European Handball Federation and rank amongst the leading indoor sports events on the international sports market. First played in 1994, the EHF EUROs have taken place in host nations across the continent on a biennial basis, with the men's event held in January and the women's in December.

The Men's EHF EURO 2012, held in Serbia, attracted a cumulative global TV audience of 1.47 billion, and was transmitted by 75 broadcasters in more than 200 territories. A record 302,688 spectators also followed the event live in five venues across the countries.

The Men's EHF EURO 2014 in Denmark has set a new attendance record with 316,000 spectators.

In 2020, the first Men's EHF EURO with 24 participating teams was held in Sweden, Austria and Norway. This championship broke a variety of records, including the attendance record with 500,000 fans following the matches live in the different venues. It was also the first time that a Men's EHF European Championship was organised by three hosts.

The Women's EHF EURO 2014 in Hungary and Croatia achieved a cumulative audience of 723 million, which is the highest ever result for the championship. The result marks not only a 90 per cent increase on the 2012 edition (380 million), but also significantly tops the previous record set in 2006 (461 million). In terms of broadcast hours, the results were equally remarkable. With 1,919 broadcast hours, the tournament further confirmed its upward trend through a 65 per cent climb of 758 hours compared to 2012. Overall, the tournament was aired in 145 countries.

Following the extension to 24 teams for the Men's EHF EURO, the Women's EHF EURO will be played for the first time with 24 participants in December 2024. The 2024 championship will be played in Austria, Hungary and Switzerland.

=== EHF Champions League ===
The EHF Champions League was launched in the 1993–94 season for both men's and women's teams. The competition has developed considerably over the years, with the introduction of a distinctive blue lagoon and black floor in the 2007–08 season, the creation of an 'EHF Champions League' ball as well as changes to the format of the competition, which saw the introduction of a new 'Last 16' and the VELUX EHF FINAL4 in the 2009–10 season. From the start of the 2011–12 season, the VELUX Group added their name to the men's competition as title sponsor, and the competition became the VELUX EHF Champions League. The 20th jubilee season (2012–13) saw the launch of a brand new corporate identity and logo. The women's competition also introduced the final tournament for the first time in the 2013–14 season and added the quarter-final stage in the following edition.

A new playing system was introduced for the EHF Champions League, for both the men's and the women's competition, with the beginning of the 2020/21 season. In both events, 16 teams are registered, divided into two groups of eight in the group phase. The first six teams of each group qualify for the knockout rounds, the last four eventually qualify for the EHF FINAL4 events which are played in Cologne (men) and Budapest (women).

For the men's competition, a new title sponsor was presented with the beginning of the 2022/23 season. The EHF Champions League was subsequently renamed to Machineseeker EHF Champions League.

=== EHF European Cup competitions ===
Over 250 clubs take part in the EHF European Cup competitions, which include EHF European League and EHF European Cup. The 2012–13 season saw a change to the men's European Cup competitions with the amalgamation of the EHF Cup and the Cup Winners' Cup to become simply the 'EHF Cup'. The change was introduced in order to create a three-tier competition system with the VELUX EHF Champions League at the top, followed by the EHF Cup and then the Challenge Cup. The same merging is planned for the 2016–17 season in the women's competitions. The EHF administers over 730 European club matches each year, which take place in all corners of the continent.

=== Beach handball ===
Beach handball originated on the beaches of Italy in the 1990s and has established itself as a sport in its own right within the EHF with the organisation of the European Beach Tour and European Championships for men, women and younger age categories. The first European Beach Handball Championships were held in 2000 in Gaeta (Italy) and the most recent was held in Lloret de Mar (Spain) in the summer of 2015. Beach handball is a World Games sport, making its debut in 2009. It will also have its premiere at the 2018 Youth Olympic Games in Buenos Aires.

=== Development ===
The EHF has a number of projects and initiatives through which it supports the development of the sport generally and also in its member federations. These include:

- Rinck Convention: named after the EHF Honorary Member, and former chairman of the EHF Methods Commission, Claude Rinck. Its aim is the mutual recognition of standards and certificates in the field of coaches' education in handball in Europe by preserving and safeguarding the regional and national characteristics of coaches' education, in order to facilitate the direct admission to work as a handball coach, in each signatory member federation.
- SMART Projects: short-term projects in member federations with specific aims and objectives; includes material support, coaching and technical support.
- Foster Projects: cooperation agreements between federations; usually between top-ranking and emerging nations to support the progress of handball's development.
- Infrastructure Support Programme (ISP): Longer-term projects in partnership with member federations; offering part-funding of salaries of staff members, such as development officers to help build capacity in member federations.

== Dress code rules ==
On 19 July 2021, at the Beach Handball EURO 2021 tournament, the EHF Disciplinary Commission imposed a fine of €150 per player, for a total fine of €1,500 for wearing shorts instead of wearing bikini bottoms. This has led to claims of sexism within the organization from several people, including Norwegian Member of Parliament Lene Westgaard-Halle. The EHF released a statement saying that "The EHF is committed to bring this topic forward in the interest of its member federations, however it must also be said that a change of the rules can only happen at IHF level".

In October 2021, the International Handball Federation announced an update to its clothing regulations, with the new regulations for women’s uniforms allowing female players the wearing of shorts.
