= European Beach Handball Tour =

International beach handball competition

- Founded: 2003; 23 years ago
- Founder: European Handball Federation

The European Beach Handball tour is a club competition for Beach Handball teams from EHF. The tournament started in 2003.

== History ==
The EHF creates the European Beach Handball Tour (EBT) in 2003. The EBT Masters Finals were held in Greece in 2009, bringing together top club teams that had qualified throughout the 2008 season, indicating an established club competition structure in that year, according to the European Handball Federation.

After carrying out the 2003 EBT – pilot project successfully (35 tournament organisers, 88 registered teams) the EHF would like to invite all the organisers and teams to make the 2004 EBT a fantastic beach handball experience. The EBT will start the season with the 2003 EBT Masters in late May 2004 at Salerno/ITA. All tournament organisers from all over Europe are asked to register and become member of the tour. The teams of the '2004 European Beach Handball Tour' will play for qualification points in order to qualify for the 2004 EBT Masters, which will be played as the kickoff of the Tour in 2005.

== Results ==
- "Ranking". beach.eurohandball.com.

Ranking by total stage points. Each year have many stages.

=== Men ===
#	Year	1st	2nd	3rd
1	2003–04	[[|]]	[[|]]	[[|]]
2	2004–05	[[|]]	[[|]]	[[|]]
3	2005–06	[[|]]	[[|]]	[[|]]
4	2006–07	[[|]]	[[|]]	[[|]]
5	2007–08	[[|]]	[[|]]	[[|]]
6	2008–09	[[|]]	[[|]]	[[|]]
7	2009–10	HUN	RUS	CRO
8	2010–11	ESP	ESP	RUS
9	2011–12	RUS	HUN	HUN
10	2012–13	CRO	HUN	POL
11	2013–14	HUN	HUN	RUS
12	2014–15	ESP	HUN	ESP
13	2015–16	HUN	CRO	CRO
14	2016–17	CRO	ESP	NED
15	2017–18	ESP	ESP	ESP
16	2018–19	CRO	HUN	ESP
17	2019–20	GER	GER	NED
18	2020–21	ESP	HUN	POR
19	2021–22	CRO	POL	POR
2	2022–23	HUN	HUN	ESP
21	2023–24	DEN	HUN	CRO
22	2024–25	NED	ESP	NED

=== Women ===
#	Year	1st	2nd	3rd
1	2003–04	[[|]]	[[|]]	[[|]]
2	2004–05	[[|]]	[[|]]	[[|]]
3	2005–06	[[|]]	[[|]]	[[|]]
4	2006–07	[[|]]	[[|]]	[[|]]
5	2007–08	[[|]]	[[|]]	[[|]]
6	2008–09	[[|]]	[[|]]	[[|]]
7	2009–10	HUN	CRO	POL
8	2010–11	POL	HUN	CRO
9	2011–12	HUN	HUN	HUN
10	2012–13	HUN	HUN	CRO
11	2013–14	HUN	HUN	NED
12	2014–15	ESP	HUN	NED
13	2015–16	HUN	NED	HUN
14	2016–17	NED	HUN	ESP
15	2017–18	ESP	HUN	HUN
16	2018–19	NED	ESP	HUN
17	2019–20	GER	POL	POL
18	2020–21	ESP	ESP	HUN
19	2021–22	HUN	HUN	NED
20	2022–23	HUN	HUN	ESP
21	2023–24	NED	HUN	HUN
22	2024–25	NED	NED	HUN

== Medals (2009–2010 To 2024–25) ==
Rank	Nation	Gold	Silver	Bronze	Total
1	Hungary (HUN)	11	18	8	37
2	Spain (ESP)	7	6	6	19
3	Netherlands (NED)	5	2	6	13
4	Croatia (CRO)	4	2	5	11
5	Germany (GER)	2	1	0	3
6	Poland (POL)	1	2	3	6
7	Russia (RUS)	1	1	2	4
8	Denmark (DEN)	1	0	0	1
9	Portugal (POR)	0	0	2	2
Totals (9 entries)		32	32	32	96

== See also ==
- EBT Masters
- 2023 IHF Beach Handball Global Tour
- 2022 IHF Beach Handball Global Tour
