= 2025 European Women's U-17 Handball Championship =

2025 Women's U-17 European Handball Championship

Tournament details
- Host country: Montenegro
- Venues: 3 (in 1 host city)
- Dates: 30 July–10 August
- Teams: 24 (from 1 confederation)

Final positions
- Champions: Slovakia (1st title)
- Runners-up: Croatia
- Third place: Montenegro
- Fourth place: Spain

Tournament statistics
- Top scorer: (Turkey) Gazel Dikme

Awards
- Best player: (Montenegro) Martina Knežević

Official website
- www.eurohandball.com

The 2025 European Women's U-17 Handball Championship was the 16th edition of the European Women's U-17 Handball Championship. The tournament was played in Podgorica, Montenegro, from 30 July to 10 August 2025. This edition featured 24 teams for the first time.

Slovakia won the competition for the first time.

== Host selection ==
- Montenegro

Montenegro won the hosting rights unopposed at an EHF meeting in Oslo on 21 June 2024.

== Expansion ==
At a meeting in Ljubljana, the EHF Executive Committee announced that they would analyse a possible expansion to 24 teams. On 17 June 2022, the EHF officially expanded the event to 24 teams.

== Format ==
The tournament consisted of three phases: The first two were played in a round-robin-groups format. The third phase was played in a playoff format with consolations.

In the First phase, 24 teams were drawn into six groups of four.

- The top two teams from each group advanced to the Main round.
- The third- and fourth-placed teams advanced to the Intermediate round.

In the Second phase, all teams were again divided into groups of four, but this time, against the teams that advanced to the same round as them. Each separate round (Main and Intermediate) was played by 12 teams, divided into three groups of four.

- In the Main round, the top two teams from each group and the best two third-placed teams advanced to the quarterfinals. The other four teams advanced to the 9th–16th place playoffs.
- In the Intermediate round, the winners of each group and the best second-placed team advanced to the 9th–16th place playoffs. The other eight teams advanced to the 17th–24th place playoffs.

In the Third phase, the teams were divided into three playoff tiers of eight teams each, with each team playing three more matches there. Each of the three playoffs consisted of four quarterfinals, two semifinals, two consolation semifinals, and four final placement matches.

== Qualification ==
To accommodate 24 teams and fill in the eight extra spots, the EHF decided to not relegate anyone in 2023. Then, the four highest ranked teams not yet qualified were brought in. To decide the final four spots, the remaining registered teams were separated into two qualification groups where the top two from each qualifier progressed to the final tournament.

Competition	Dates	Host	Vacancies	Qualified
Host nation	21 June 2024	(Norway) Oslo	1	Montenegro
Women's 17 EHF EURO 2023	3–13 July 2023	Montenegro	15	France; Denmark; Germany; Croatia; Hungary; Serbia; Netherlands; Sweden; Norway; Romania; Czech Republic; Switzerland; Portugal; Iceland; North Macedonia
Rankings			4	Austria; Faroe Islands; Slovenia; Spain
Qualification	22–24 November 2024	(Poland) Radzymin	2	Poland; Lithuania
Qualification	22–24 November 2024	(Turkey) Çankaya	2	Slovakia; Turkey

== Venues ==
The venues are in Podgorica.

2025 European Women's U-17 Handball Championship is located in Montenegro
Bemax Arena; Capacity: 2,244	Morača Sports Center; Capacity: 2,100	Verde Complex; Capacity: 6,000

== Draw ==
The draw was held on 28 January 2025 in Vienna at 11:00 (CET). The draw was conducted by EHF Secretary General, Martin Hausleitner, and Chief Sports Officer, Markus Glaser. As hosts, Montenegro had the right to select their group.

Pot 1	Pot 2	Pot 3	Pot 4
Denmark; Hungary; Germany; France; Croatia; Netherlands	Norway; Sweden; Montenegro; Romania; Iceland; Portugal	Switzerland; North Macedonia; Czech Republic; Serbia; Spain; Austria	Slovenia; Faroe Islands; Slovakia; Poland; Lithuania; Turkey

== Preliminary round ==
All times are local (Central European Summer Time; UTC+2).

=== Group A ===
Pos	Team	Pld	W	D	L	GF	GA	GD	Pts	Qualification
1	Spain	3	2	1	0	94	73	+21	5	Main round
2	Denmark	3	2	1	0	88	70	+18	5	Main round
3	Sweden	3	1	0	2	80	82	−2	2	Intermediate round
4	Turkey	3	0	0	3	61	98	−37	0	Intermediate round

Source: EHF
Rules for classification: 1) points; 2) head-to-head points; 3) head-to-head goal difference; 4) head-to-head number of goals scored; 5) Goal difference.

30 July 2025; 12:00	Sweden	30–24	Turkey	Bemax Arena, Podgorica; Attendance: 100; Referees: L. Hardegger, S. Hardegger (SUI)
30 July 2025; 12:00	Elmblad, Herlitz 5	(15–11)	Dikme 10	Bemax Arena, Podgorica; Attendance: 100; Referees: L. Hardegger, S. Hardegger (SUI)
30 July 2025; 12:00	4× (suspension)	Report	5× (suspension)	Bemax Arena, Podgorica; Attendance: 100; Referees: L. Hardegger, S. Hardegger (SUI)

30 July 2025; 17:00	Denmark	28–28	Spain	Bemax Arena, Podgorica; Attendance: 213; Referees: Fotakidis, Kinatzidis (GRE)
30 July 2025; 17:00	Østergaard 7	(16–15)	Bastarrika, Ballart, Cano 4	Bemax Arena, Podgorica; Attendance: 213; Referees: Fotakidis, Kinatzidis (GRE)
30 July 2025; 17:00	4× (suspension)	Report	1× (yellow card) 2× (suspension)	Bemax Arena, Podgorica; Attendance: 213; Referees: Fotakidis, Kinatzidis (GRE)

31 July 2025; 12:00	Spain	33–16	Turkey	Bemax Arena, Podgorica; Attendance: 100; Referees: Ivanauskas, Jencevičius (LTU)
31 July 2025; 12:00	Vladu 8	(17–7)	Dikme 6	Bemax Arena, Podgorica; Attendance: 100; Referees: Ivanauskas, Jencevičius (LTU)
31 July 2025; 12:00	5× (suspension)	Report	3× (suspension)	Bemax Arena, Podgorica; Attendance: 100; Referees: Ivanauskas, Jencevičius (LTU)

31 July 2025; 17:00	Denmark	25–21	Sweden	Bemax Arena, Podgorica; Attendance: 287; Referees: Pavićević, Martinović (MNE)
31 July 2025; 17:00	Andersen 8	(13–9)	Linder 4	Bemax Arena, Podgorica; Attendance: 287; Referees: Pavićević, Martinović (MNE)
31 July 2025; 17:00	4× (suspension)	Report	4× (suspension) 1× (red card)	Bemax Arena, Podgorica; Attendance: 287; Referees: Pavićević, Martinović (MNE)

2 August 2025; 12:00	Turkey	21–35	Denmark	Morača Arena, Podgorica; Attendance: 72; Referees: Klompers, Stobbe (NED)
2 August 2025; 12:00	Dikme, Kestek 5	(8–18)	Nørby 6	Morača Arena, Podgorica; Attendance: 72; Referees: Klompers, Stobbe (NED)
2 August 2025; 12:00	7× (suspension) 1× (red card)	Report	1× (yellow card) 3× (suspension)	Morača Arena, Podgorica; Attendance: 72; Referees: Klompers, Stobbe (NED)

2 August 2025; 17:00	Sweden	29–33	Spain	Morača Arena, Podgorica; Attendance: 127; Referees: Brodić, Hodžić (CRO)
2 August 2025; 17:00	Månsson 10	(12–17)	Aguado, Ballart 5	Morača Arena, Podgorica; Attendance: 127; Referees: Brodić, Hodžić (CRO)
2 August 2025; 17:00	1× (yellow card) 3× (suspension)	Report	2× (suspension)	Morača Arena, Podgorica; Attendance: 127; Referees: Brodić, Hodžić (CRO)

=== Group B ===
Pos	Team	Pld	W	D	L	GF	GA	GD	Pts	Qualification
1	Slovakia	3	2	1	0	86	68	+18	5	Main round
2	Germany	3	2	1	0	79	64	+15	5	Main round
3	Portugal	3	0	1	2	80	87	−7	1	Intermediate round
4	North Macedonia	3	0	1	2	68	94	−26	1	Intermediate round

Source: EHF
Rules for classification: 1) points; 2) head-to-head points; 3) head-to-head goal difference; 4) head-to-head number of goals scored; 5) Goal difference.

30 July 2025; 14:30	Portugal	26–31	Slovakia	Bemax Arena, Podgorica; Attendance: 152; Referees: Pavićević, Martinović (MNE)
30 July 2025; 14:30	Ri. Lopes 7	(12–17)	Bartková 8	Bemax Arena, Podgorica; Attendance: 152; Referees: Pavićević, Martinović (MNE)
30 July 2025; 14:30	5× (suspension)	Report	1× (yellow card) 2× (suspension)	Bemax Arena, Podgorica; Attendance: 152; Referees: Pavićević, Martinović (MNE)

30 July 2025; 19:30	Germany	31–18	North Macedonia	Bemax Arena, Podgorica; Attendance: 93; Referees: Ivanauskas, Jencevičius (LTU)
30 July 2025; 19:30	Bender 5	(18–8)	Berovikj 4	Bemax Arena, Podgorica; Attendance: 93; Referees: Ivanauskas, Jencevičius (LTU)
30 July 2025; 19:30	1× (yellow card) 3× (suspension)	Report	2× (yellow card) 2× (suspension) 1× (red card)	Bemax Arena, Podgorica; Attendance: 93; Referees: Ivanauskas, Jencevičius (LTU)

31 July 2025; 14:30	North Macedonia	21–34	Slovakia	Bemax Arena, Podgorica; Attendance: 83; Referees: L. Hardegger, S. Hardegger (SUI)
31 July 2025; 14:30	Berovikj, Dimoska 5	(8–14)	Bartková 7	Bemax Arena, Podgorica; Attendance: 83; Referees: L. Hardegger, S. Hardegger (SUI)
31 July 2025; 14:30	7× (suspension) 1× (red card)	Report	1× (yellow card) 4× (suspension)	Bemax Arena, Podgorica; Attendance: 83; Referees: L. Hardegger, S. Hardegger (SUI)

31 July 2025; 19:30	Germany	27–25	Portugal	Bemax Arena, Podgorica; Attendance: 61; Referees: Dašić, Husomanović (NOR)
31 July 2025; 19:30	Kasper 6	(12–11)	Ri. Lopes 9	Bemax Arena, Podgorica; Attendance: 61; Referees: Dašić, Husomanović (NOR)
31 July 2025; 19:30	2× (suspension)	Report	3× (suspension)	Bemax Arena, Podgorica; Attendance: 61; Referees: Dašić, Husomanović (NOR)

2 August 2025; 14:30	Slovakia	21–21	Germany	Morača Arena, Podgorica; Attendance: 102; Referees: Berdić, Šorak (SRB)
2 August 2025; 14:30	Bartková 5	(11–9)	Kugler, Lammich 4	Morača Arena, Podgorica; Attendance: 102; Referees: Berdić, Šorak (SRB)
2 August 2025; 14:30	2× (yellow card) 5× (suspension)	Report	1× (yellow card) 4× (suspension)	Morača Arena, Podgorica; Attendance: 102; Referees: Berdić, Šorak (SRB)

2 August 2025; 19:30	Portugal	29–29	North Macedonia	Morača Arena, Podgorica; Attendance: 67; Referees: Härgin, Makejev (EST)
2 August 2025; 19:30	Lima, Vieira 5	(15–10)	Berovikj 6	Morača Arena, Podgorica; Attendance: 67; Referees: Härgin, Makejev (EST)
2 August 2025; 19:30	3× (suspension)	Report	6× (suspension)	Morača Arena, Podgorica; Attendance: 67; Referees: Härgin, Makejev (EST)

=== Group C ===
Pos	Team	Pld	W	D	L	GF	GA	GD	Pts	Qualification
1	Switzerland	3	3	0	0	97	69	+28	6	Main round
2	Netherlands	3	2	0	1	86	71	+15	4	Main round
3	Iceland	3	1	0	2	80	79	+1	2	Intermediate round
4	Faroe Islands	3	0	0	3	50	94	−44	0	Intermediate round

Source: EHF
Rules for classification: 1) points; 2) head-to-head points; 3) head-to-head goal difference; 4) head-to-head number of goals scored; 5) Goal difference.

30 July 2025; 12:00	Iceland	33–15	Faroe Islands	Morača Arena, Podgorica; Attendance: 89; Referees: R. Haggui, S. Haggui (TUN)
30 July 2025; 12:00	Óskarsdóttir, Styrmisdóttir 6	(16–6)	Magnussen 4	Morača Arena, Podgorica; Attendance: 89; Referees: R. Haggui, S. Haggui (TUN)
30 July 2025; 12:00	2× (suspension)	Report	1× (yellow card) 2× (suspension)	Morača Arena, Podgorica; Attendance: 89; Referees: R. Haggui, S. Haggui (TUN)

30 July 2025; 17:00	Netherlands	27–31	Switzerland	Morača Arena, Podgorica; Attendance: 100; Referees: Brodić, Hodžić (CRO)
30 July 2025; 17:00	Kwakman 8	(15–15)	Mierzwa 10	Morača Arena, Podgorica; Attendance: 100; Referees: Brodić, Hodžić (CRO)
30 July 2025; 17:00	2× (yellow card) 5× (suspension)	Report		Morača Arena, Podgorica; Attendance: 100; Referees: Brodić, Hodžić (CRO)

31 July 2025; 12:00	Switzerland	31–20	Faroe Islands	Morača Arena, Podgorica; Attendance: 80; Referees: Hummelgård, Svensson (SWE)
31 July 2025; 12:00	Emmenegger 10	(16–12)	Haldansen 5	Morača Arena, Podgorica; Attendance: 80; Referees: Hummelgård, Svensson (SWE)
31 July 2025; 12:00	2× (suspension)	Report	4× (suspension)	Morača Arena, Podgorica; Attendance: 80; Referees: Hummelgård, Svensson (SWE)

31 July 2025; 17:00	Netherlands	29–25	Iceland	Morača Arena, Podgorica; Attendance: 250; Referees: Riello, Panetta (ITA)
31 July 2025; 17:00	Hogervorst, Kwakman 7	(16–16)	Óskarsdóttir 11	Morača Arena, Podgorica; Attendance: 250; Referees: Riello, Panetta (ITA)
31 July 2025; 17:00	2× (yellow card) 7× (suspension)	Report	4× (suspension)	Morača Arena, Podgorica; Attendance: 250; Referees: Riello, Panetta (ITA)

2 August 2025; 12:00	Faroe Islands	15–30	Netherlands	Verde Complex, Podgorica; Attendance: 81; Referees: Ivanauskas, Jencevičius (LTU)
2 August 2025; 12:00	Mariusardóttir, Wang 4	(8–18)	Alberts, Pater, Rensen 4	Verde Complex, Podgorica; Attendance: 81; Referees: Ivanauskas, Jencevičius (LTU)
2 August 2025; 12:00	3× (suspension)	Report	4× (suspension)	Verde Complex, Podgorica; Attendance: 81; Referees: Ivanauskas, Jencevičius (LTU)

2 August 2025; 17:00	Iceland	22–35	Switzerland	Verde Complex, Podgorica; Attendance: 121; Referees: Cazan, Suliman (ROU)
2 August 2025; 17:00	Óskarsdóttir 5	(8–18)	Heer 6	Verde Complex, Podgorica; Attendance: 121; Referees: Cazan, Suliman (ROU)
2 August 2025; 17:00	2× (yellow card) 7× (suspension)	Report	4× (suspension)	Verde Complex, Podgorica; Attendance: 121; Referees: Cazan, Suliman (ROU)

=== Group D ===
Pos	Team	Pld	W	D	L	GF	GA	GD	Pts	Qualification
1	Hungary	3	3	0	0	101	72	+29	6	Main round
2	Slovenia	3	1	0	2	77	79	−2	2 (Note: Head-to-head goal difference: Slovenia +3, Serbia –1, Norway –2.)	Main round
3	Serbia	3	1	0	2	88	106	−18	2	Intermediate round
4	Norway	3	1	0	2	95	104	−9	2	Intermediate round

Source: EHF
Rules for classification: 1) points; 2) head-to-head points; 3) head-to-head goal difference; 4) head-to-head number of goals scored; 5) Goal difference.
Notes:

30 July 2025; 14:30	Norway	29–26	Slovenia	Morača Arena, Podgorica; Attendance: 127; Referees: Cazan, Suliman (ROU)
30 July 2025; 14:30	Jensen 8	(12–11)	Novak 7	Morača Arena, Podgorica; Attendance: 127; Referees: Cazan, Suliman (ROU)
30 July 2025; 14:30	1× (yellow card) 3× (suspension)	Report	1× (yellow card) 5× (suspension)	Morača Arena, Podgorica; Attendance: 127; Referees: Cazan, Suliman (ROU)

30 July 2025; 19:30	Hungary	39–22	Serbia	Morača Arena, Podgorica; Attendance: 77; Referees: Härgin, Makejev (EST)
30 July 2025; 19:30	Takács, Zákányi 6	(14–10)	Žakula 7	Morača Arena, Podgorica; Attendance: 77; Referees: Härgin, Makejev (EST)
30 July 2025; 19:30	3× (suspension)	Report	5× (suspension)	Morača Arena, Podgorica; Attendance: 77; Referees: Härgin, Makejev (EST)

31 July 2025; 14:30	Serbia	23–29	Slovenia	Morača Arena, Podgorica; Attendance: 74; Referees: Nygaard, Primdahl (DEN)
31 July 2025; 14:30	Dušić 7	(7–15)	Štukelj 6	Morača Arena, Podgorica; Attendance: 74; Referees: Nygaard, Primdahl (DEN)
31 July 2025; 14:30	1× (yellow card) 5× (suspension)	Report	1× (yellow card) 3× (suspension)	Morača Arena, Podgorica; Attendance: 74; Referees: Nygaard, Primdahl (DEN)

31 July 2025; 19:30	Hungary	35–28	Norway	Morača Arena, Podgorica; Attendance: 98; Referees: Brodić, Hodžić (CRO)
31 July 2025; 19:30	Szigeti 12	(16–12)	Breda-Ruud 8	Morača Arena, Podgorica; Attendance: 98; Referees: Brodić, Hodžić (CRO)
31 July 2025; 19:30	5× (suspension)	Report	4× (suspension)	Morača Arena, Podgorica; Attendance: 98; Referees: Brodić, Hodžić (CRO)

2 August 2025; 14:30	Norway	38–43	Serbia	Verde Complex, Podgorica; Attendance: 100; Referees: R. Haggui, S. Haggui (TUN)
2 August 2025; 14:30	Thomsen 6	(19–19)	Dušić 14	Verde Complex, Podgorica; Attendance: 100; Referees: R. Haggui, S. Haggui (TUN)
2 August 2025; 14:30	3× (suspension)	Report	4× (suspension)	Verde Complex, Podgorica; Attendance: 100; Referees: R. Haggui, S. Haggui (TUN)

2 August 2025; 19:30	Slovenia	22–27	Hungary	Verde Complex, Podgorica; Attendance: 100; Referees: Pavićević, Martinović (MNE)
2 August 2025; 19:30	Novak 6	(13–13)	Szigeti 7	Verde Complex, Podgorica; Attendance: 100; Referees: Pavićević, Martinović (MNE)
2 August 2025; 19:30	1× (yellow card) 6× (suspension)	Report	3× (suspension)	Verde Complex, Podgorica; Attendance: 100; Referees: Pavićević, Martinović (MNE)

=== Group E ===
Pos	Team	Pld	W	D	L	GF	GA	GD	Pts	Qualification
1	France	3	3	0	0	96	73	+23	6	Main round
2	Montenegro (H)	3	2	0	1	87	74	+13	4	Main round
3	Czech Republic	3	1	0	2	78	73	+5	2	Intermediate round
4	Lithuania	3	0	0	3	68	109	−41	0	Intermediate round

Source: EHF
Rules for classification: 1) points; 2) head-to-head points; 3) head-to-head goal difference; 4) head-to-head number of goals scored; 5) Goal difference.
(H) Hosts

30 July 2025; 12:00	France	27–25	Czech Republic	Verde Complex, Podgorica; Attendance: 85; Referees: Berdić, Šorak (SRB)
30 July 2025; 12:00	Noslen 6	(14–12)	Nedvědová 6	Verde Complex, Podgorica; Attendance: 85; Referees: Berdić, Šorak (SRB)
30 July 2025; 12:00	2× (suspension)	Report	4× (suspension)	Verde Complex, Podgorica; Attendance: 85; Referees: Berdić, Šorak (SRB)

30 July 2025; 17:00	Montenegro	36–25	Lithuania	Verde Complex, Podgorica; Attendance: 305; Referees: Riello, Panetta (ITA)
30 July 2025; 17:00	Savić, Tešović 7	(18–10)	Juozaitytė 8	Verde Complex, Podgorica; Attendance: 305; Referees: Riello, Panetta (ITA)
30 July 2025; 17:00	4× (suspension)	Report	1× (yellow card) 5× (suspension) 1× (red card)	Verde Complex, Podgorica; Attendance: 305; Referees: Riello, Panetta (ITA)

31 July 2025; 12:00	Czech Republic	34–20	Lithuania	Verde Complex, Podgorica; Attendance: 50; Referees: R. Haggui, S. Haggui (TUN)
31 July 2025; 12:00	Hanzlíková 7	(15–8)	Žilinskas 5	Verde Complex, Podgorica; Attendance: 50; Referees: R. Haggui, S. Haggui (TUN)
31 July 2025; 12:00	1× (yellow card) 3× (suspension)	Report	1× (yellow card) 5× (suspension)	Verde Complex, Podgorica; Attendance: 50; Referees: R. Haggui, S. Haggui (TUN)

31 July 2025; 17:00	France	30–25	Montenegro	Verde Complex, Podgorica; Attendance: 350; Referees: Härgin, Makejev (EST)
31 July 2025; 17:00	Noslen 5	(11–10)	Knežević 7	Verde Complex, Podgorica; Attendance: 350; Referees: Härgin, Makejev (EST)
31 July 2025; 17:00	5× (suspension)	Report	5× (suspension)	Verde Complex, Podgorica; Attendance: 350; Referees: Härgin, Makejev (EST)

2 August 2025; 12:00	Lithuania	23–39	France	Bemax Arena, Podgorica; Attendance: 95; Referees: Hummelgård, Svensson (SWE)
2 August 2025; 12:00	Ustilaitė 8	(11–18)	Saramito 6	Bemax Arena, Podgorica; Attendance: 95; Referees: Hummelgård, Svensson (SWE)
2 August 2025; 12:00	1× (yellow card) 6× (suspension)	Report	2× (suspension)	Bemax Arena, Podgorica; Attendance: 95; Referees: Hummelgård, Svensson (SWE)

2 August 2025; 17:00	Montenegro	26–19	Czech Republic	Bemax Arena, Podgorica; Attendance: 259; Referees: Fotakidis, Kinatzidis (GRE)
2 August 2025; 17:00	Orbović 6	(12–8)	Nedvědová 4	Bemax Arena, Podgorica; Attendance: 259; Referees: Fotakidis, Kinatzidis (GRE)
2 August 2025; 17:00	1× (yellow card) 7× (suspension)	Report	1× (yellow card) 5× (suspension)	Bemax Arena, Podgorica; Attendance: 259; Referees: Fotakidis, Kinatzidis (GRE)

=== Group F ===
Pos	Team	Pld	W	D	L	GF	GA	GD	Pts	Qualification
1	Croatia	3	3	0	0	105	77	+28	6	Main round
2	Poland	3	1	1	1	93	89	+4	3	Main round
3	Austria	3	1	0	2	84	102	−18	2	Intermediate round
4	Romania	3	0	1	2	94	108	−14	1	Intermediate round

Source: EHF
Rules for classification: 1) points; 2) head-to-head points; 3) head-to-head goal difference; 4) head-to-head number of goals scored; 5) Goal difference.

30 July 2025; 14:30	Romania	33–33	Poland	Verde Complex, Podgorica; Attendance: 100; Referees: Nygaard, Primdahl (DEN)
30 July 2025; 14:30	Stoican 10	(20–15)	Tobolewska 10	Verde Complex, Podgorica; Attendance: 100; Referees: Nygaard, Primdahl (DEN)
30 July 2025; 14:30	1× (yellow card) 2× (suspension)	Report	3× (suspension)	Verde Complex, Podgorica; Attendance: 100; Referees: Nygaard, Primdahl (DEN)

30 July 2025; 19:30	Croatia	33–25	Austria	Verde Complex, Podgorica; Attendance: 100; Referees: Klompers, Stobbe (NED)
30 July 2025; 19:30	Jerković 7	(15–11)	Csoka 6	Verde Complex, Podgorica; Attendance: 100; Referees: Klompers, Stobbe (NED)
30 July 2025; 19:30	6× (suspension)	Report	1× (yellow card) 4× (suspension)	Verde Complex, Podgorica; Attendance: 100; Referees: Klompers, Stobbe (NED)

31 July 2025; 14:30	Austria	23–37	Poland	Verde Complex, Podgorica; Attendance: 98; Referees: Berdić, Šorak (SRB)
31 July 2025; 14:30	Holzer 5	(12–20)	Purzyńska 7	Verde Complex, Podgorica; Attendance: 98; Referees: Berdić, Šorak (SRB)
31 July 2025; 14:30	4× (suspension)	Report	6× (suspension)	Verde Complex, Podgorica; Attendance: 98; Referees: Berdić, Šorak (SRB)

31 July 2025; 19:30	Croatia	39–29	Romania	Verde Complex, Podgorica; Attendance: 125; Referees: Fotakidis, Kinatzidis (GRE)
31 July 2025; 19:30	Jerković 11	(19–18)	Stoican 7	Verde Complex, Podgorica; Attendance: 125; Referees: Fotakidis, Kinatzidis (GRE)
31 July 2025; 19:30	5× (suspension) 1× (red card)	Report	7× (suspension)	Verde Complex, Podgorica; Attendance: 125; Referees: Fotakidis, Kinatzidis (GRE)

2 August 2025; 14:30	Poland	23–33	Croatia	Bemax Arena, Podgorica; Attendance: 120; Referees: L. Hardegger, S. Hardegger (SUI)
2 August 2025; 14:30	Kuchczyńska 5	(14–15)	Barić 9	Bemax Arena, Podgorica; Attendance: 120; Referees: L. Hardegger, S. Hardegger (SUI)
2 August 2025; 14:30	2× (suspension)	Report	5× (suspension)	Bemax Arena, Podgorica; Attendance: 120; Referees: L. Hardegger, S. Hardegger (SUI)

2 August 2025; 19:30	Romania	32–36	Austria	Bemax Arena, Podgorica; Attendance: 250; Referees: Dašić, Husomanović (NOR)
2 August 2025; 19:30	Lefter 9	(18–17)	Hahn 7	Bemax Arena, Podgorica; Attendance: 250; Referees: Dašić, Husomanović (NOR)
2 August 2025; 19:30	2× (yellow card) 5× (suspension)	Report	1× (yellow card) 4× (suspension) 2× (red card)	Bemax Arena, Podgorica; Attendance: 250; Referees: Dašić, Husomanović (NOR)

== Main round ==
Points and goals gained in the preliminary group against teams that advanced were transferred to the main round.

=== Group G ===
Pos	Team	Pld	W	D	L	GF	GA	GD	Pts	Qualification
1	Denmark	3	1	2	0	78	77	+1	4	Quarterfinals
2	Slovakia	3	1	1	1	67	65	+2	3	Quarterfinals
3	Spain	3	1	1	1	77	79	−2	3	Quarterfinals
4	Germany	3	0	2	1	75	76	−1	2	9th–16th place playoffs

Source: EHF
Rules for classification: 1) points; 2) head-to-head points; 3) head-to-head goal difference; 4) head-to-head number of goals scored; 5) Goal difference.

4 August 2025; 17:00	Denmark	28–28	Germany	Verde Complex, Podgorica; Attendance: 171; Referees: Brodić, Hodžić (CRO)
4 August 2025; 17:00	Taylor 7	(16–15)	Lammich 5	Verde Complex, Podgorica; Attendance: 171; Referees: Brodić, Hodžić (CRO)
4 August 2025; 17:00	1× (yellow card) 2× (suspension)	Report	6× (suspension)	Verde Complex, Podgorica; Attendance: 171; Referees: Brodić, Hodžić (CRO)

4 August 2025; 19:30	Spain	22–25	Slovakia	Verde Complex, Podgorica; Attendance: 100; Referees: Fotakidis, Kinatzidis (GRE)
4 August 2025; 19:30	Vladu 6	(13–12)	Gogolová 7	Verde Complex, Podgorica; Attendance: 100; Referees: Fotakidis, Kinatzidis (GRE)
4 August 2025; 19:30	2× (suspension)	Report	1× (yellow card) 4× (suspension)	Verde Complex, Podgorica; Attendance: 100; Referees: Fotakidis, Kinatzidis (GRE)

5 August 2025; 17:00	Germany	26–27	Spain	Verde Complex, Podgorica; Attendance: 144; Referees: Cazan, Suliman (ROU)
5 August 2025; 17:00	Lammich 6	(16–15)	Ballart 9	Verde Complex, Podgorica; Attendance: 144; Referees: Cazan, Suliman (ROU)
5 August 2025; 17:00	1× (yellow card) 5× (suspension)	Report	4× (suspension)	Verde Complex, Podgorica; Attendance: 144; Referees: Cazan, Suliman (ROU)

5 August 2025; 19:30	Slovakia	21–22	Denmark	Verde Complex, Podgorica; Attendance: 192; Referees: Härgin, Makejev (EST)
5 August 2025; 19:30	Gogová 7	(13–8)	Østergaard 8	Verde Complex, Podgorica; Attendance: 192; Referees: Härgin, Makejev (EST)
5 August 2025; 19:30	4× (suspension)	Report	1× (yellow card) 5× (suspension)	Verde Complex, Podgorica; Attendance: 192; Referees: Härgin, Makejev (EST)

=== Group H ===
Pos	Team	Pld	W	D	L	GF	GA	GD	Pts	Qualification
1	Switzerland	3	3	0	0	97	79	+18	6	Quarterfinals
2	Hungary	3	2	0	1	87	89	−2	4	Quarterfinals
3	Netherlands	3	0	1	2	80	86	−6	1	9th–16th place playoffs
4	Slovenia	3	0	1	2	69	79	−10	1	9th–16th place playoffs

Source: EHF
Rules for classification: 1) points; 2) head-to-head points; 3) head-to-head goal difference; 4) head-to-head number of goals scored; 5) Goal difference.

4 August 2025; 17:00	Netherlands	25–25	Slovenia	Bemax Arena, Podgorica; Attendance: 121; Referees: Berdić, Šorak (SRB)
4 August 2025; 17:00	Kwakman 8	(16–15)	Novak 7	Bemax Arena, Podgorica; Attendance: 121; Referees: Berdić, Šorak (SRB)
4 August 2025; 17:00	1× (yellow card) 5× (suspension) 1× (red card)	Report	3× (suspension)	Bemax Arena, Podgorica; Attendance: 121; Referees: Berdić, Šorak (SRB)

4 August 2025; 19:30	Switzerland	39–30	Hungary	Bemax Arena, Podgorica; Attendance: 93; Referees: Nygaard, Primdahl (DEN)
4 August 2025; 19:30	Mierzwa 16	(18–16)	Kozma 7	Bemax Arena, Podgorica; Attendance: 93; Referees: Nygaard, Primdahl (DEN)
4 August 2025; 19:30	4× (suspension) 1× (red card)	Report	1× (yellow card) 8× (suspension)	Bemax Arena, Podgorica; Attendance: 93; Referees: Nygaard, Primdahl (DEN)

5 August 2025; 17:00	Slovenia	22–27	Switzerland	Bemax Arena, Podgorica; Attendance: 66; Referees: Riello, Panetta (ITA)
5 August 2025; 17:00	Štukelj 6	(10–19)	Osterwalder 5	Bemax Arena, Podgorica; Attendance: 66; Referees: Riello, Panetta (ITA)
5 August 2025; 17:00	3× (suspension)	Report	3× (suspension)	Bemax Arena, Podgorica; Attendance: 66; Referees: Riello, Panetta (ITA)

5 August 2025; 19:30	Hungary	30–28	Netherlands	Bemax Arena, Podgorica; Attendance: 99; Referees: Hummelgård, Svensson (SWE)
5 August 2025; 19:30	Kozma, Mózes, Szigeti 7	(17–16)	Kwakman, Ostojić 6	Bemax Arena, Podgorica; Attendance: 99; Referees: Hummelgård, Svensson (SWE)
5 August 2025; 19:30	3× (suspension)	Report	1× (yellow card) 1× (suspension)	Bemax Arena, Podgorica; Attendance: 99; Referees: Hummelgård, Svensson (SWE)

=== Group I ===
Pos	Team	Pld	W	D	L	GF	GA	GD	Pts	Qualification
1	Montenegro	3	2	0	1	86	77	+9	4	Quarterfinals
2	Croatia	3	2	0	1	80	79	+1	4	Quarterfinals
3	France	3	1	1	1	81	78	+3	3	Quarterfinals
4	Poland	3	0	1	2	76	89	−13	1	9th–16th place playoffs

Source: EHF
Rules for classification: 1) points; 2) head-to-head points; 3) head-to-head goal difference; 4) head-to-head number of goals scored; 5) Goal difference.

4 August 2025; 17:00	Montenegro	30–27	Poland	Morača Arena, Podgorica; Attendance: 325; Referees: Cazan, Suliman (ROU)
4 August 2025; 17:00	Knežević 11	(13–11)	Tobolewska 10	Morača Arena, Podgorica; Attendance: 325; Referees: Cazan, Suliman (ROU)
4 August 2025; 17:00	1× (yellow card) 3× (suspension)	Report	2× (yellow card) 4× (suspension)	Morača Arena, Podgorica; Attendance: 325; Referees: Cazan, Suliman (ROU)

4 August 2025; 19:30	France	25–27	Croatia	Morača Arena, Podgorica; Attendance: 120; Referees: Härgin, Makejev (EST)
4 August 2025; 19:30	Noslen 7	(13–11)	Koska 7	Morača Arena, Podgorica; Attendance: 120; Referees: Härgin, Makejev (EST)
4 August 2025; 19:30	3× (suspension)	Report	2× (suspension)	Morača Arena, Podgorica; Attendance: 120; Referees: Härgin, Makejev (EST)

5 August 2025; 17:00	Croatia	20–31	Montenegro	Morača Arena, Podgorica; Attendance: 400; Referees: Fotakidis, Kinatzidis (GRE)
5 August 2025; 17:00	Gregurić, Jurlina 4	(11–15)	Knežević 8	Morača Arena, Podgorica; Attendance: 400; Referees: Fotakidis, Kinatzidis (GRE)
5 August 2025; 17:00	2× (suspension)	Report	7× (suspension)	Morača Arena, Podgorica; Attendance: 400; Referees: Fotakidis, Kinatzidis (GRE)

5 August 2025; 19:30	Poland	26–26	France	Morača Arena, Podgorica; Attendance: 120; Referees: Dašić, Husomanović (NOR)
5 August 2025; 19:30	Tobolewska 11	(14–18)	Cavalier, Noslen 4	Morača Arena, Podgorica; Attendance: 120; Referees: Dašić, Husomanović (NOR)
5 August 2025; 19:30	2× (suspension)	Report	2× (suspension)	Morača Arena, Podgorica; Attendance: 120; Referees: Dašić, Husomanović (NOR)

=== Ranking of third-placed teams ===
Pos	Grp	Team	Pld	W	D	L	GF	GA	GD	Pts	Qualification
1	I	France	3	1	1	1	81	78	+3	3	Quarterfinals
2	G	Spain	3	1	1	1	77	79	−2	3	Quarterfinals
3	H	Netherlands	3	0	1	2	80	86	−6	1	9th–16th place playoffs

Source: EHF
Rules for classification: 1) points; 2) head-to-head points; 3) head-to-head goal difference; 4) head-to-head number of goals scored; 5) goal difference.

== Intermediate round ==
Points and goals gained in the preliminary group against teams that advanced were transferred to the intermediate round.

=== Group J ===
Pos	Team	Pld	W	D	L	GF	GA	GD	Pts	Qualification
1	Portugal	3	2	1	0	89	79	+10	5	9th–16th place playoffs
2	Sweden	3	2	0	1	97	77	+20	4	9th–16th place playoffs
3	North Macedonia	3	1	1	1	82	98	−16	3	17th–24th place playoffs
4	Turkey	3	0	0	3	76	90	−14	0	17th–24th place playoffs

Source: EHF
Rules for classification: 1) points; 2) head-to-head points; 3) head-to-head goal difference; 4) head-to-head number of goals scored; 5) Goal difference.

4 August 2025; 12:00	Turkey	27–30	North Macedonia	Verde Complex, Podgorica; Attendance: 54; Referees: Dašić, Husomanović (NOR)
4 August 2025; 12:00	Dikme 9	(14–13)	Berovikj 8	Verde Complex, Podgorica; Attendance: 54; Referees: Dašić, Husomanović (NOR)
4 August 2025; 12:00	1× (yellow card) 4× (suspension)	Report	1× (yellow card) 5× (suspension)	Verde Complex, Podgorica; Attendance: 54; Referees: Dašić, Husomanović (NOR)

4 August 2025; 14:30	Sweden	25–30	Portugal	Verde Complex, Podgorica; Attendance: 100; Referees: R. Haggui, S. Haggui (TUN)
4 August 2025; 14:30	Wong 5	(9–13)	Ri. Lopes 9	Verde Complex, Podgorica; Attendance: 100; Referees: R. Haggui, S. Haggui (TUN)
4 August 2025; 14:30	5× (suspension)	Report	3× (suspension)	Verde Complex, Podgorica; Attendance: 100; Referees: R. Haggui, S. Haggui (TUN)

5 August 2025; 12:00	North Macedonia	23–42	Sweden	Verde Complex, Podgorica; Attendance: 37; Referees: Ivanauskas, Jencevičius (LTU)
5 August 2025; 12:00	Berovikj 5	(13–20)	Herlitz 12	Verde Complex, Podgorica; Attendance: 37; Referees: Ivanauskas, Jencevičius (LTU)
5 August 2025; 12:00	5× (suspension)	Report	6× (suspension)	Verde Complex, Podgorica; Attendance: 37; Referees: Ivanauskas, Jencevičius (LTU)

5 August 2025; 14:30	Portugal	30–25	Turkey	Verde Complex, Podgorica; Attendance: 57; Referees: Pavićević, Martinović (MNE)
5 August 2025; 14:30	Bernardino, Ri. Lopes 7	(14–9)	Kahraman 6	Verde Complex, Podgorica; Attendance: 57; Referees: Pavićević, Martinović (MNE)
5 August 2025; 14:30	6× (suspension)	Report	1× (suspension)	Verde Complex, Podgorica; Attendance: 57; Referees: Pavićević, Martinović (MNE)

=== Group K ===
Pos	Team	Pld	W	D	L	GF	GA	GD	Pts	Qualification
1	Serbia	3	2	1	0	105	80	+25	5	9th–16th place playoffs
2	Norway	3	2	0	1	105	92	+13	4	17th–24th place playoffs
3	Iceland	3	1	1	1	95	80	+15	3	17th–24th place playoffs
4	Faroe Islands	3	0	0	3	44	97	−53	0	17th–24th place playoffs

Source: EHF
Rules for classification: 1) points; 2) head-to-head points; 3) head-to-head goal difference; 4) head-to-head number of goals scored; 5) Goal difference.

4 August 2025; 12:00	Faroe Islands	17–32	Norway	Bemax Arena, Podgorica; Attendance: 89; Referees: Riello, Panetta (ITA)
4 August 2025; 12:00	Haldansen 7	(9–14)	Berland 6	Bemax Arena, Podgorica; Attendance: 89; Referees: Riello, Panetta (ITA)
4 August 2025; 12:00	1× (suspension)	Report	4× (suspension)	Bemax Arena, Podgorica; Attendance: 89; Referees: Riello, Panetta (ITA)

4 August 2025; 14:30	Iceland	30–30	Serbia	Bemax Arena, Podgorica; Attendance: 67; Referees: Klompers, Stobbe (NED)
4 August 2025; 14:30	Ægisdóttir 7	(17–18)	Dušić 10	Bemax Arena, Podgorica; Attendance: 67; Referees: Klompers, Stobbe (NED)
4 August 2025; 14:30	1× (yellow card) 3× (suspension)	Report	5× (suspension) 1× (red card)	Bemax Arena, Podgorica; Attendance: 67; Referees: Klompers, Stobbe (NED)

5 August 2025; 12:00	Norway	35–32	Iceland	Bemax Arena, Podgorica; Attendance: 114; Referees: Nygaard, Primdahl (DEN)
5 August 2025; 12:00	Jensen, Surdal 7	(18–17)	Óskarsdóttir 12	Bemax Arena, Podgorica; Attendance: 114; Referees: Nygaard, Primdahl (DEN)
5 August 2025; 12:00	1× (suspension)	Report	2× (yellow card) 2× (suspension)	Bemax Arena, Podgorica; Attendance: 114; Referees: Nygaard, Primdahl (DEN)

5 August 2025; 14:30	Serbia	32–12	Faroe Islands	Bemax Arena, Podgorica; Attendance: 98; Referees: L. Hardegger, S. Hardegger (SUI)
5 August 2025; 14:30	Dušić 8	(14–5)	Haldansen 5	Bemax Arena, Podgorica; Attendance: 98; Referees: L. Hardegger, S. Hardegger (SUI)
5 August 2025; 14:30	4× (suspension)	Report	6× (suspension)	Bemax Arena, Podgorica; Attendance: 98; Referees: L. Hardegger, S. Hardegger (SUI)

=== Group L ===
Pos	Team	Pld	W	D	L	GF	GA	GD	Pts	Qualification
1	Czech Republic	3	2	1	0	87	66	+21	5	9th–16th place playoffs
2	Austria	3	2	0	1	100	89	+11	4	17th–24th place playoffs
3	Lithuania	3	1	0	2	76	103	−27	2	17th–24th place playoffs
4	Romania	3	0	1	2	83	88	−5	1	17th–24th place playoffs

Source: EHF
Rules for classification: 1) points; 2) head-to-head points; 3) head-to-head goal difference; 4) head-to-head number of goals scored; 5) Goal difference.

4 August 2025; 12:00	Lithuania	29–28	Romania	Morača Arena, Podgorica; Attendance: 28; Referees: L. Hardegger, S. Hardegger (SUI)
4 August 2025; 12:00	Ustilaitė 12	(11–15)	Roșu 7	Morača Arena, Podgorica; Attendance: 28; Referees: L. Hardegger, S. Hardegger (SUI)
4 August 2025; 12:00	6× (suspension)	Report	3× (suspension)	Morača Arena, Podgorica; Attendance: 28; Referees: L. Hardegger, S. Hardegger (SUI)

4 August 2025; 14:30	Czech Republic	30–23	Austria	Morača Arena, Podgorica; Attendance: 80; Referees: Hummelgård, Svensson (SWE)
4 August 2025; 14:30	Nedvědová 5	(14–11)	Hahn, Igwebuike 4	Morača Arena, Podgorica; Attendance: 80; Referees: Hummelgård, Svensson (SWE)
4 August 2025; 14:30	4× (suspension)	Report	2× (suspension)	Morača Arena, Podgorica; Attendance: 80; Referees: Hummelgård, Svensson (SWE)

5 August 2025; 12:00	Romania	23–23	Czech Republic	Morača Arena, Podgorica; Attendance: 100; Referees: Klompers, Stobbe (NED)
5 August 2025; 12:00	Stoican 6	(10–13)	Königová 8	Morača Arena, Podgorica; Attendance: 100; Referees: Klompers, Stobbe (NED)
5 August 2025; 12:00	3× (yellow card) 3× (suspension)	Report	6× (suspension) 1× (red card)	Morača Arena, Podgorica; Attendance: 100; Referees: Klompers, Stobbe (NED)

5 August 2025; 14:30	Austria	41–27	Lithuania	Morača Arena, Podgorica; Attendance: 80; Referees: R. Haggui, S. Haggui (TUN)
5 August 2025; 14:30	Hahn 10	(23–15)	Butkutė 6	Morača Arena, Podgorica; Attendance: 80; Referees: R. Haggui, S. Haggui (TUN)
5 August 2025; 14:30	4× (suspension)	Report	1× (yellow card) 5× (suspension)	Morača Arena, Podgorica; Attendance: 80; Referees: R. Haggui, S. Haggui (TUN)

=== Ranking of second-placed teams ===
Pos	Grp	Team	Pld	W	D	L	GF	GA	GD	Pts	Qualification
1	J	Sweden	3	2	0	1	97	77	+20	4	9th–16th place playoffs
2	K	Norway	3	2	0	1	105	92	+13	4	17th–24th place playoffs
3	L	Austria	3	2	0	1	100	89	+11	4	17th–24th place playoffs

Source: EHF
Rules for classification: 1) points; 2) head-to-head points; 3) head-to-head goal difference; 4) head-to-head number of goals scored; 5) goal difference.

== 17th–24th place playoffs ==
21st place match
North Macedonia	25
Romania	40
23rd place match
Faroe Islands	26
Turkey	31

21st–24th place semifinals
Faroe Islands	28
North Macedonia	31
Turkey	27
Romania	41

17th–24th place quarterfinals
1	Norway	33
8	Faroe Islands	17
4	North Macedonia	24
5	Lithuania	33
2	Austria	38
7	Turkey	30
3	Iceland	32
6	Romania	26

17th–20th place semifinals
Norway	31
Lithuania	27
Austria	27
Iceland	31

17th place match
Norway	27
Iceland	29
19th place match
Lithuania	33
Austria	39

=== 17th–24th place quarterfinals ===
7 August 2025; 12:00	Norway	33–17	Faroe Islands	Verde Complex, Podgorica; Attendance: 44; Referees: Klompers, Stobbe (NED)
7 August 2025; 12:00	Abdelhai 8	(17–7)	Mariusardóttir 4	Verde Complex, Podgorica; Attendance: 44; Referees: Klompers, Stobbe (NED)
7 August 2025; 12:00	1× (yellow card) 1× (suspension)	Report	3× (suspension)	Verde Complex, Podgorica; Attendance: 44; Referees: Klompers, Stobbe (NED)

7 August 2025; 14:30	North Macedonia	24–33	Lithuania	Verde Complex, Podgorica; Attendance: 25; Referees: L. Hardegger, S. Hardegger (SUI)
7 August 2025; 14:30	Meißner 6	(12–16)	Dikme 9	Verde Complex, Podgorica; Attendance: 25; Referees: L. Hardegger, S. Hardegger (SUI)
7 August 2025; 14:30	6× (suspension)	Report	7× (suspension)	Verde Complex, Podgorica; Attendance: 25; Referees: L. Hardegger, S. Hardegger (SUI)

7 August 2025; 17:00	Austria	38–30	Turkey	Verde Complex, Podgorica; Attendance: 57; Referees: R. Haggui, S. Haggui (TUN)
7 August 2025; 17:00	Ægisdóttir, Óskarsdóttir 8	(21–15)	Lupuian 7	Verde Complex, Podgorica; Attendance: 57; Referees: R. Haggui, S. Haggui (TUN)
7 August 2025; 17:00	1× (yellow card) 5× (suspension) 1× (red card)	Report	1× (yellow card) 3× (suspension)	Verde Complex, Podgorica; Attendance: 57; Referees: R. Haggui, S. Haggui (TUN)

7 August 2025; 19:30	Iceland	32–26	Romania	Verde Complex, Podgorica; Attendance: 40; Referees: Pavićević, Martinović (MNE)
7 August 2025; 19:30	Baloska, Dimoska, Laskoska 5	(16–12)	Ustilaitė 8	Verde Complex, Podgorica; Attendance: 40; Referees: Pavićević, Martinović (MNE)
7 August 2025; 19:30	1× (yellow card) 8× (suspension)	Report	3× (suspension)	Verde Complex, Podgorica; Attendance: 40; Referees: Pavićević, Martinović (MNE)

=== 21st–24th place semifinals ===
8 August 2025; 12:00	Faroe Islands	28–31	North Macedonia	Verde Complex, Podgorica; Attendance: 48; Referees: Dašić, Husomanović (NOR)
8 August 2025; 12:00	Mariusardóttir 10	(17–10)	Trifunoska 10	Verde Complex, Podgorica; Attendance: 48; Referees: Dašić, Husomanović (NOR)
8 August 2025; 12:00	1× (yellow card) 5× (suspension)	Report	7× (suspension)	Verde Complex, Podgorica; Attendance: 48; Referees: Dašić, Husomanović (NOR)

8 August 2025; 17:00	Turkey	27–41	Romania	Verde Complex, Podgorica; Attendance: 26; Referees: Klompers, Stobbe (NED)
8 August 2025; 17:00	Dikme 11	(16–26)	Lefter 11	Verde Complex, Podgorica; Attendance: 26; Referees: Klompers, Stobbe (NED)
8 August 2025; 17:00	3× (suspension)	Report	2× (suspension)	Verde Complex, Podgorica; Attendance: 26; Referees: Klompers, Stobbe (NED)

=== 23rd place match ===
10 August 2025; 9:30	Faroe Islands	26–31	Turkey	Verde Complex, Podgorica; Attendance: 51; Referees: Ivanauskas, Jencevičius (LTU)
10 August 2025; 9:30	Wang 7	(12–17)	Dikme 11	Verde Complex, Podgorica; Attendance: 51; Referees: Ivanauskas, Jencevičius (LTU)
10 August 2025; 9:30	3× (suspension)	Report	6× (suspension)	Verde Complex, Podgorica; Attendance: 51; Referees: Ivanauskas, Jencevičius (LTU)

=== 21st place match ===
10 August 2025; 9:30	North Macedonia	25–40	Romania	Morača Arena, Podgorica; Attendance: 22; Referees: Nygaard, Primdahl (DEN)
10 August 2025; 9:30	Laskoska 7	(10–22)	Stark 8	Morača Arena, Podgorica; Attendance: 22; Referees: Nygaard, Primdahl (DEN)
10 August 2025; 9:30	1× (yellow card) 3× (suspension)	Report	1× (yellow card)	Morača Arena, Podgorica; Attendance: 22; Referees: Nygaard, Primdahl (DEN)

=== 17th–20th place semifinals ===
8 August 2025; 14:30	Norway	31–27	Lithuania	Verde Complex, Podgorica; Attendance: 49; Referees: Hummelgård, Svensson (SWE)
8 August 2025; 14:30	Eilertsen 6	(19–13)	Ustilaitė 10	Verde Complex, Podgorica; Attendance: 49; Referees: Hummelgård, Svensson (SWE)
8 August 2025; 14:30	3× (suspension)	Report	4× (suspension)	Verde Complex, Podgorica; Attendance: 49; Referees: Hummelgård, Svensson (SWE)

8 August 2025; 19:30	Austria	27–31	Iceland	Verde Complex, Podgorica; Attendance: 136; Referees: Ivanauskas, Jencevičius (LTU)
8 August 2025; 19:30	Csoka 7	(14–17)	Ægisdóttir 9	Verde Complex, Podgorica; Attendance: 136; Referees: Ivanauskas, Jencevičius (LTU)
8 August 2025; 19:30		Report	4× (suspension)	Verde Complex, Podgorica; Attendance: 136; Referees: Ivanauskas, Jencevičius (LTU)

=== 19th place match ===
10 August 2025; 9:30	Lithuania	33–39	Austria	Bemax Arena, Podgorica; Attendance: 51; Referees: Dašić, Husomanović (NOR)
10 August 2025; 9:30	Žilinskas 10	(13–21)	Hahn 6	Bemax Arena, Podgorica; Attendance: 51; Referees: Dašić, Husomanović (NOR)
10 August 2025; 9:30	1× (yellow card) 6× (suspension)	Report	3× (suspension)	Bemax Arena, Podgorica; Attendance: 51; Referees: Dašić, Husomanović (NOR)

=== 17th place match ===
10 August 2025; 12:00	Norway	27–29	Iceland	Verde Complex, Podgorica; Attendance: 212; Referees: Härgin, Makejev (EST)
10 August 2025; 12:00	Surdal 5	(10–18)	Óskarsdóttir 10	Verde Complex, Podgorica; Attendance: 212; Referees: Härgin, Makejev (EST)
10 August 2025; 12:00	3× (suspension)	Report	2× (suspension)	Verde Complex, Podgorica; Attendance: 212; Referees: Härgin, Makejev (EST)

== 9th–16th place playoffs ==
13th place match
Netherlands	22
Slovenia	21
15th place match
Poland	31
Portugal	35

13th–16th place semifinals
Netherlands	32
Poland	31
Portugal	20
Slovenia	26

9th–16th place quarterfinals
1	Netherlands	27
8	Sweden	36
4	Poland	26
5	Serbia	31
2	Germany	37
7	Portugal	20
3	Slovenia	16
6	Czech Republic	25

9th–12th place semifinals
Sweden	32
Serbia	37
Germany	30
Czech Republic	32

9th place match
Serbia	35
Czech Republic	38
11th place match
Sweden	22
Germany	35

=== 9th–16th place quarterfinals ===
7 August 2025; 12:00	Netherlands	27–36	Sweden	Bemax Arena, Podgorica; Attendance: 107; Referees: Brodić, Hodžić (CRO)
7 August 2025; 12:00	Kwakman, Smink 5	(13–18)	Högquist 8	Bemax Arena, Podgorica; Attendance: 107; Referees: Brodić, Hodžić (CRO)
7 August 2025; 12:00	1× (yellow card) 2× (suspension)	Report		Bemax Arena, Podgorica; Attendance: 107; Referees: Brodić, Hodžić (CRO)

7 August 2025; 12:00	Poland	26–31	Serbia	Morača Arena, Podgorica; Attendance: 270; Referees: Fotakidis, Kinatzidis (GRE)
7 August 2025; 12:00	Urbaniak 7	(9–17)	Dušić, Valdevit 10	Morača Arena, Podgorica; Attendance: 270; Referees: Fotakidis, Kinatzidis (GRE)
7 August 2025; 12:00	1× (yellow card) 2× (suspension)	Report	4× (suspension)	Morača Arena, Podgorica; Attendance: 270; Referees: Fotakidis, Kinatzidis (GRE)

7 August 2025; 14:30	Germany	37–20	Portugal	Bemax Arena, Podgorica; Attendance: 83; Referees: Härgin, Makejev (EST)
7 August 2025; 14:30	Kurok 7	(20–10)	Bernardino 5	Bemax Arena, Podgorica; Attendance: 83; Referees: Härgin, Makejev (EST)
7 August 2025; 14:30	2× (yellow card) 3× (suspension)	Report	3× (suspension) 1× (red card)	Bemax Arena, Podgorica; Attendance: 83; Referees: Härgin, Makejev (EST)

7 August 2025; 14:30	Slovenia	16–25	Czech Republic	Morača Arena, Podgorica; Attendance: 86; Referees: Nygaard, Primdahl (DEN)
7 August 2025; 14:30	Vuković 6	(5–14)	Königová 8	Morača Arena, Podgorica; Attendance: 86; Referees: Nygaard, Primdahl (DEN)
7 August 2025; 14:30	7× (suspension)	Report	1× (yellow card) 4× (suspension)	Morača Arena, Podgorica; Attendance: 86; Referees: Nygaard, Primdahl (DEN)

=== 13th–16th place semifinals ===
8 August 2025; 12:00	Netherlands	32–31	Poland	Morača Arena, Podgorica; Attendance: 80; Referees: Pavićević, Martinović (MNE)
8 August 2025; 12:00	Kwakman 7	(18–16)	Tobolewska, Trochimczyk 7	Morača Arena, Podgorica; Attendance: 80; Referees: Pavićević, Martinović (MNE)
8 August 2025; 12:00	1× (yellow card) 8× (suspension)	Report	4× (suspension)	Morača Arena, Podgorica; Attendance: 80; Referees: Pavićević, Martinović (MNE)

8 August 2025; 14:30	Portugal	20–26	Slovenia	Morača Arena, Podgorica; Attendance: 89; Referees: Berdić, Šorak (SRB)
8 August 2025; 14:30	Francisco, Ra. Lopes 4	(11–16)	Markežić 7	Morača Arena, Podgorica; Attendance: 89; Referees: Berdić, Šorak (SRB)
8 August 2025; 14:30	2× (yellow card) 6× (suspension)	Report	5× (suspension)	Morača Arena, Podgorica; Attendance: 89; Referees: Berdić, Šorak (SRB)

=== 15th place match ===
10 August 2025; 12:00	Poland	31–35	Portugal	Morača Arena, Podgorica; Attendance: 50; Referees: Riello, Panetta (ITA)
10 August 2025; 12:00	Cielątkowska, Tobolewska 5	(15–18)	Bernardino 8	Morača Arena, Podgorica; Attendance: 50; Referees: Riello, Panetta (ITA)
10 August 2025; 12:00	3× (suspension)	Report	2× (suspension)	Morača Arena, Podgorica; Attendance: 50; Referees: Riello, Panetta (ITA)

=== 13th place match ===
10 August 2025; 12:00	Netherlands	22–21	Slovenia	Bemax Arena, Podgorica; Attendance: 97; Referees: Hummelgård, Svensson (SWE)
10 August 2025; 12:00	Kwakman 6	(13–11)	Petek, Štukelj 4	Bemax Arena, Podgorica; Attendance: 97; Referees: Hummelgård, Svensson (SWE)
10 August 2025; 12:00	3× (suspension)	Report	2× (suspension)	Bemax Arena, Podgorica; Attendance: 97; Referees: Hummelgård, Svensson (SWE)

=== 9th–12th place semifinals ===
8 August 2025; 12:00	Sweden	32–37	Serbia	Bemax Arena, Podgorica; Attendance: 55; Referees: Riello, Panetta (ITA)
8 August 2025; 12:00	Elmblad 10	(17–18)	Valdevit 9	Bemax Arena, Podgorica; Attendance: 55; Referees: Riello, Panetta (ITA)
8 August 2025; 12:00	6× (suspension)	Report	6× (suspension)	Bemax Arena, Podgorica; Attendance: 55; Referees: Riello, Panetta (ITA)

8 August 2025; 14:30	Germany	30–32	Czech Republic	Bemax Arena, Podgorica; Attendance: 240; Referees: L. Hardegger, S. Hardegger (SUI)
8 August 2025; 14:30	Hofer 7	(13–12)	Francová, Königová 6	Bemax Arena, Podgorica; Attendance: 240; Referees: L. Hardegger, S. Hardegger (SUI)
8 August 2025; 14:30	1× (yellow card) 3× (suspension)	Report	1× (yellow card) 1× (suspension)	Bemax Arena, Podgorica; Attendance: 240; Referees: L. Hardegger, S. Hardegger (SUI)

=== 11th place match ===
10 August 2025; 14:30	Sweden	22–35	Germany	Verde Complex, Podgorica; Attendance: 319; Referees: Klompers, Stobbe (NED)
10 August 2025; 14:30	Linder, Schmidinger 4	(9–17)	Rusko 10	Verde Complex, Podgorica; Attendance: 319; Referees: Klompers, Stobbe (NED)
10 August 2025; 14:30	2× (suspension)	Report	1× (suspension)	Verde Complex, Podgorica; Attendance: 319; Referees: Klompers, Stobbe (NED)

=== 9th place match ===
10 August 2025; 14:30	Serbia	35–38	Czech Republic	Bemax Arena, Podgorica; Attendance: 63; Referees: Cazan, Suliman (ROU)
10 August 2025; 14:30	Andrić 10	(12–22)	Königová 15	Bemax Arena, Podgorica; Attendance: 63; Referees: Cazan, Suliman (ROU)
10 August 2025; 14:30	3× (suspension)	Report	6× (suspension)	Bemax Arena, Podgorica; Attendance: 63; Referees: Cazan, Suliman (ROU)

== Championship playoffs ==
5th place match
Switzerland	35
Denmark	34
7th place match
Hungary	30
France	26

5th–8th place semifinals
Switzerland	37
Hungary	33
France	29
Denmark	30

Quarterfinals
1	Switzerland	27
8	Spain	29
4	Croatia	32
5	Hungary	26
2	Montenegro	31
7	France	29
3	Denmark	29
6	Slovakia	30

Semifinals
Spain	28
Croatia	31
Montenegro	27
Slovakia	29

Final
Croatia	30
Slovakia	34
3rd place match
Spain	20
Montenegro	22

=== Quarterfinals ===
7 August 2025
17:00
Montenegro
31–29 (ET)
France
Bemax Arena, Podgorica
Attendance: 750
Referees: Hummelgård, Svensson (SWE)
Knežević 8
(13–10)
Noslen 12
1× (yellow card) 5× (suspension)
Report
1× (suspension)

FT: 22–22 ET: 4–4, 5–3

7 August 2025; 17:00	Denmark	29–30	Slovakia	Morača Arena, Podgorica; Attendance: 250; Referees: Cazan, Suliman (ROU)
7 August 2025; 17:00	Nørby 5	(15–15)	Komlós 8	Morača Arena, Podgorica; Attendance: 250; Referees: Cazan, Suliman (ROU)
7 August 2025; 17:00	1× (yellow card) 4× (suspension)	Report	1× (yellow card) 1× (suspension)	Morača Arena, Podgorica; Attendance: 250; Referees: Cazan, Suliman (ROU)

7 August 2025; 19:30	Switzerland	27–29	Spain	Bemax Arena, Podgorica; Attendance: 58; Referees: Berdić, Šorak (SRB)
7 August 2025; 19:30	Mierzwa 9	(13–15)	Sánchez 6	Bemax Arena, Podgorica; Attendance: 58; Referees: Berdić, Šorak (SRB)
7 August 2025; 19:30	2× (suspension)	Report	3× (suspension)	Bemax Arena, Podgorica; Attendance: 58; Referees: Berdić, Šorak (SRB)

7 August 2025; 19:30	Croatia	32–26	Hungary	Morača Arena, Podgorica; Attendance: 98; Referees: Riello, Panetta (ITA)
7 August 2025; 19:30	Jerković 8	(17–13)	Takács 5	Morača Arena, Podgorica; Attendance: 98; Referees: Riello, Panetta (ITA)
7 August 2025; 19:30	5× (suspension)	Report	1× (yellow card) 4× (suspension)	Morača Arena, Podgorica; Attendance: 98; Referees: Riello, Panetta (ITA)

=== 5th–8th place semifinals ===
8 August 2025; 17:00	France	29–30	Denmark	Morača Arena, Podgorica; Attendance: 80; Referees: Brodić, Hodžić (CRO)
8 August 2025; 17:00	Cavalier 6	(16–18)	Nørby 9	Morača Arena, Podgorica; Attendance: 80; Referees: Brodić, Hodžić (CRO)
8 August 2025; 17:00	1× (yellow card) 2× (suspension) 1× (red card)	Report	1× (yellow card) 2× (suspension)	Morača Arena, Podgorica; Attendance: 80; Referees: Brodić, Hodžić (CRO)

8 August 2025; 19:30	Switzerland	37–33	Hungary	Morača Arena, Podgorica; Attendance: 91; Referees: R. Haggui, S. Haggui (TUN)
8 August 2025; 19:30	Osterwalder 12	(23–19)	Kozma 5	Morača Arena, Podgorica; Attendance: 91; Referees: R. Haggui, S. Haggui (TUN)
8 August 2025; 19:30	2× (suspension)	Report	1× (yellow card) 4× (suspension) 1× (red card)	Morača Arena, Podgorica; Attendance: 91; Referees: R. Haggui, S. Haggui (TUN)

=== 7th place match ===
10 August 2025; 14:30	Hungary	30–26	France	Morača Arena, Podgorica; Attendance: 98; Referees: Berdić, Šorak (SRB)
10 August 2025; 14:30	Keller 7	(20–11)	Holler 6	Morača Arena, Podgorica; Attendance: 98; Referees: Berdić, Šorak (SRB)
10 August 2025; 14:30	5× (suspension)	Report	5× (suspension)	Morača Arena, Podgorica; Attendance: 98; Referees: Berdić, Šorak (SRB)

=== 5th place match ===
10 August 2025
17:00
Switzerland
35–34 (ET)
Denmark
Morača Arena, Podgorica
Attendance: 320
Referees: Pavićević, Martinović (MNE)
Herger 10
(16–21)
Andersen 10
4× (suspension)
Report

FT: 32–32 ET: 3–2

=== Semifinals ===
8 August 2025; 17:00	Montenegro	27–29	Slovakia	Bemax Arena, Podgorica; Attendance: 1,015; Referees: Nygaard, Primdahl (DEN)
8 August 2025; 17:00	Knežević 13	(14–16)	Bartková 11	Bemax Arena, Podgorica; Attendance: 1,015; Referees: Nygaard, Primdahl (DEN)
8 August 2025; 17:00	1× (yellow card) 5× (suspension)	Report	1× (yellow card) 1× (suspension)	Bemax Arena, Podgorica; Attendance: 1,015; Referees: Nygaard, Primdahl (DEN)

8 August 2025; 19:30	Spain	28–31	Croatia	Bemax Arena, Podgorica; Attendance: 320; Referees: Cazan, Suliman (ROU)
8 August 2025; 19:30	Vladu 6	(17–15)	Barić 12	Bemax Arena, Podgorica; Attendance: 320; Referees: Cazan, Suliman (ROU)
8 August 2025; 19:30	6× (suspension)	Report	4× (suspension)	Bemax Arena, Podgorica; Attendance: 320; Referees: Cazan, Suliman (ROU)

=== 3rd place match ===
10 August 2025; 17:00	Spain	20–22	Montenegro	Bemax Arena, Podgorica; Attendance: 1,217; Referees: Brodić, Hodžić (CRO)
10 August 2025; 17:00	Velasco 7	(11–8)	Orbović, Savić 6	Bemax Arena, Podgorica; Attendance: 1,217; Referees: Brodić, Hodžić (CRO)
10 August 2025; 17:00	4× (suspension)	Report	2× (suspension)	Bemax Arena, Podgorica; Attendance: 1,217; Referees: Brodić, Hodžić (CRO)

=== Final ===
10 August 2025; 19:30	Croatia	30–34	Slovakia	Bemax Arena, Podgorica; Attendance: 2,008; Referees: Fotakidis, Kinatzidis (GRE)
10 August 2025; 19:30	Jerković 6	(17–18)	Bartková 14	Bemax Arena, Podgorica; Attendance: 2,008; Referees: Fotakidis, Kinatzidis (GRE)
10 August 2025; 19:30	5× (suspension)	Report	3× (suspension)	Bemax Arena, Podgorica; Attendance: 2,008; Referees: Fotakidis, Kinatzidis (GRE)

== Final standings ==
Rank	Team
1st place, gold medalist(s)	Slovakia
2nd place, silver medalist(s)	Croatia
3rd place, bronze medalist(s)	Montenegro
4	Spain
5	Switzerland
6	Denmark
7	Hungary
8	France
9	Czech Republic
10	Serbia
11	Germany
12	Sweden
13	Netherlands
14	Slovenia
15	Portugal
16	Poland
17	Iceland
18	Norway
19	Austria
20	Lithuania
21	Romania
22	North Macedonia
23	Turkey
24	Faroe Islands

Team qualified for the 2026 IHF Women's U18 Handball World Championship
Team qualified for the 2026 IHF Women's U18 Handball World Championship as a host nation

== Awards ==
=== All-star Team ===
Source: EHF

- (Montenegro) Martina Knežević – MVP
- (Turkey) Gazel Dikme – top scorer

2025 U-17 European Champions

Slovakia
First title

== See also ==
- 2025 European Women's U-19 Handball Championship
- 2025 Women's U-17 EHF Championship
- 2025 Women's U-19 EHF Championship
