= 2025 Women's U-19 EHF Championship =

Tournament details
- Host country: Georgia
- City: Telavi
- Venue: 1 (in 1 host city)
- Dates: 12–20 July 2025
- Teams: 10 (from 1 confederation)

Final positions
- Champions: Ukraine
- Runners-up: Slovakia
- Third place: Italy
- Fourth place: Belgium

Tournament statistics
- Matches played: 30
- Goals scored: 1,692 (56.4 per match)
- Attendance: 5,873 (196 per match)
- Top scorer(s): (Bulgaria) Melina Spasova (54 goals)

Awards
- Best player: (Ukraine) Liubov Rosokha

Official website
- Official website

The 2025 Women's U-19 EHF Championship was held in Telavi, Georgia from 12 to 20 July 2025.

Ukraine won the trophy after beating Slovakia.

== Teams ==
- Belgium
- Bulgaria
- Georgia
- Great Britain
- Israel
- Italy
- Kosovo
- Luxembourg
- Slovakia
- Ukraine

== Venue ==
The venue was the Telavi Sports Palace in Telavi.

2025 Women's U-19 EHF Championship is located in Georgia	Telavi
2025 Women's U-19 EHF Championship is located in Georgia	Telavi Sports Palace
2025 Women's U-19 EHF Championship is located in Georgia	Capacity: 1,500

== Draw ==
The draw was held on 28 January 2025 at the EHF headquarters in Vienna at 11:00 (CET). The draw was conducted by EHF Secretary General, Martin Hausleitner, and Chief Sports Officer, Markus Glaser. As hosts, Georgia had the right to select their group.

Pot 1	Pot 2	Pot 3	Pot 4	Pot 5
Italy; Slovakia	Israel; Georgia	Kosovo; Luxembourg	Bulgaria; Great Britain	Belgium; Ukraine

After the draw they would later change the format from two groups of five to a group of ten. Each team would play four against the teams they were drawn against. The following teams played each other:

Group 1	Group 2
Belgium; Georgia; Israel; Kosovo; Slovakia	Bulgaria; Great Britain; Italy; Luxembourg; Ukraine

== Preliminary round ==
Pos	Team	Pld	W	D	L	GF	GA	GD	Pts	Qualification
1	Slovakia	4	4	0	0	128	81	+47	8	Semifinals
2	Ukraine	4	4	0	0	131	91	+40	8	Semifinals
3	Belgium	4	3	0	1	135	113	+22	6	Semifinals
4	Italy	4	3	0	1	116	106	+10	6	Semifinals
5	Kosovo	4	2	0	2	101	93	+8	4	5–8 classification
6	Luxembourg	4	2	0	2	116	113	+3	4	5–8 classification
7	Great Britain	4	1	0	3	103	132	−29	2	5–8 classification
8	Israel	4	1	0	3	98	134	−36	2	5–8 classification
9	Georgia	4	0	0	4	94	119	−25	0	9–10 classification
10	Bulgaria	4	0	0	4	109	149	−40	0	9–10 classification

Source: EHF
Rules for classification: 1) points; 2) head-to-head points; 3) head-to-head goal difference; 4) head-to-head number of goals scored; 5) goal difference.

12 July 2025; 08:30	Great Britain	28−32	Ukraine	Telavi Sports Palace, Telavi; Attendance: 102; Referees: Burič, Lovrić (SLO)
12 July 2025; 08:30	Savidge King 8	(13−16)	Parhomenko 8	Telavi Sports Palace, Telavi; Attendance: 102; Referees: Burič, Lovrić (SLO)
12 July 2025; 08:30	1× (yellow card) 6× (suspension)	Report	2× (yellow card) 2× (suspension)	Telavi Sports Palace, Telavi; Attendance: 102; Referees: Burič, Lovrić (SLO)

12 July 2025; 10:30	Belgium	28−34	Slovakia	Telavi Sports Palace, Telavi; Attendance: 103; Referees: Martin-Eckersall, Silva (GBR)
12 July 2025; 10:30	Peeters 8	(14−18)	Letková 9	Telavi Sports Palace, Telavi; Attendance: 103; Referees: Martin-Eckersall, Silva (GBR)
12 July 2025; 10:30	3× (suspension)	Report	1× (suspension)	Telavi Sports Palace, Telavi; Attendance: 103; Referees: Martin-Eckersall, Silva (GBR)

12 July 2025; 12:30	Israel	21−33	Luxembourg	Telavi Sports Palace, Telavi; Attendance: 200; Referees: Kyriakou, Grapsas (GRE)
12 July 2025; 12:30	Rotman 5	(9−17)	Ciufoli 8	Telavi Sports Palace, Telavi; Attendance: 200; Referees: Kyriakou, Grapsas (GRE)
12 July 2025; 12:30	1× (yellow card) 8× (suspension)	Report	1× (yellow card) 5× (suspension)	Telavi Sports Palace, Telavi; Attendance: 200; Referees: Kyriakou, Grapsas (GRE)

12 July 2025; 14:30	Italy	24−22	Georgia	Telavi Sports Palace, Telavi; Attendance: 567; Referees: Xavier, Bragança (POR)
12 July 2025; 14:30	Falser 6	(15−12)	Dzamunashvili 8	Telavi Sports Palace, Telavi; Attendance: 567; Referees: Xavier, Bragança (POR)
12 July 2025; 14:30	2× (suspension)	Report	1× (yellow card) 5× (suspension)	Telavi Sports Palace, Telavi; Attendance: 567; Referees: Xavier, Bragança (POR)

12 July 2025; 16:30	Kosovo	31−21	Bulgaria	Telavi Sports Palace, Telavi; Attendance: 150; Referees: Oganezov, Raidmets (EST)
12 July 2025; 16:30	Bibaj 8	(15−10)	Skacikova, Spasova 7	Telavi Sports Palace, Telavi; Attendance: 150; Referees: Oganezov, Raidmets (EST)
12 July 2025; 16:30	1× (yellow card) 4× (suspension)	Report	5× (suspension)	Telavi Sports Palace, Telavi; Attendance: 150; Referees: Oganezov, Raidmets (EST)

13 July 2025; 08:30	Great Britain	14−38	Slovakia	Telavi Sports Palace, Telavi; Attendance: 105; Referees: Kaplinsky, Pinker (ISR)
13 July 2025; 08:30	Concar 3	(6−16)	Lukačínová 9	Telavi Sports Palace, Telavi; Attendance: 105; Referees: Kaplinsky, Pinker (ISR)
13 July 2025; 08:30	4× (suspension)	Report	2× (yellow card) 3× (suspension)	Telavi Sports Palace, Telavi; Attendance: 105; Referees: Kaplinsky, Pinker (ISR)

13 July 2025; 10:30	Kosovo	18−27	Ukraine	Telavi Sports Palace, Telavi; Attendance: 88; Referees: Xavier, Bragança (POR)
13 July 2025; 10:30	Dresh 4	(10−11)	Rosokha 8	Telavi Sports Palace, Telavi; Attendance: 88; Referees: Xavier, Bragança (POR)
13 July 2025; 10:30	7× (suspension) 1× (red card)	Report	1× (yellow card) 7× (suspension) 1× (red card)	Telavi Sports Palace, Telavi; Attendance: 88; Referees: Xavier, Bragança (POR)

13 July 2025; 12:30	Israel	39−32	Bulgaria	Telavi Sports Palace, Telavi; Attendance: 125; Referees: Martin-Eckersall, Silva (GBR)
13 July 2025; 12:30	Weber 10	(15−18)	Spasova 10	Telavi Sports Palace, Telavi; Attendance: 125; Referees: Martin-Eckersall, Silva (GBR)
13 July 2025; 12:30	3× (suspension)	Report	4× (suspension)	Telavi Sports Palace, Telavi; Attendance: 125; Referees: Martin-Eckersall, Silva (GBR)

13 July 2025; 14:30	Belgium	34−25	Georgia	Telavi Sports Palace, Telavi; Attendance: 250; Referees: Burič, Lovrić (SLO)
13 July 2025; 14:30	DanielsLenaers 8	(17−16)	Dzamunashvili 7	Telavi Sports Palace, Telavi; Attendance: 250; Referees: Burič, Lovrić (SLO)
13 July 2025; 14:30	4× (suspension)	Report	2× (suspension) 1× (red card)	Telavi Sports Palace, Telavi; Attendance: 250; Referees: Burič, Lovrić (SLO)

13 July 2025; 16:30	Italy	28−21	Luxembourg	Telavi Sports Palace, Telavi; Attendance: 110; Referees: Oganezov, Raidmets (EST)
13 July 2025; 16:30	Falser 7	(18−12)	Ciufoli 6	Telavi Sports Palace, Telavi; Attendance: 110; Referees: Oganezov, Raidmets (EST)
13 July 2025; 16:30	3× (suspension)	Report	1× (yellow card) 3× (suspension)	Telavi Sports Palace, Telavi; Attendance: 110; Referees: Oganezov, Raidmets (EST)

15 July 2025; 08:30	Luxembourg	28−34	Belgium	Telavi Sports Palace, Telavi; Attendance: 72; Referees: Kyriakou, Grapsas (GRE)
15 July 2025; 08:30	Ciufoli 13	(15−16)	Put 10	Telavi Sports Palace, Telavi; Attendance: 72; Referees: Kyriakou, Grapsas (GRE)
15 July 2025; 08:30	3× (suspension)	Report	5× (suspension)	Telavi Sports Palace, Telavi; Attendance: 72; Referees: Kyriakou, Grapsas (GRE)

15 July 2025; 10:30	Bulgaria	30−40	Italy	Telavi Sports Palace, Telavi; Attendance: 88; Referees: Burič, Lovrić (SLO)
15 July 2025; 10:30	Spasova 10	(11−18)	Falser 8	Telavi Sports Palace, Telavi; Attendance: 88; Referees: Burič, Lovrić (SLO)
15 July 2025; 10:30	3× (suspension)	Report	1× (suspension)	Telavi Sports Palace, Telavi; Attendance: 88; Referees: Burič, Lovrić (SLO)

15 July 2025; 12:30	Ukraine	39−21	Israel	Telavi Sports Palace, Telavi; Attendance: 210; Referees: Martin-Eckersall, Silva (GBR)
15 July 2025; 12:30	Malovana 9	(18−10)	Dagan, Lulu 4	Telavi Sports Palace, Telavi; Attendance: 210; Referees: Martin-Eckersall, Silva (GBR)
15 July 2025; 12:30	3× (suspension) 2× (red card)	Report	9× (suspension)	Telavi Sports Palace, Telavi; Attendance: 210; Referees: Martin-Eckersall, Silva (GBR)

15 July 2025; 14:30	Georgia	28−31	Great Britain	Telavi Sports Palace, Telavi; Attendance: 330; Referees: Xavier, Bragança (POR)
15 July 2025; 14:30	Arabidze 12	(14−19)	Concar 15	Telavi Sports Palace, Telavi; Attendance: 330; Referees: Xavier, Bragança (POR)
15 July 2025; 14:30	4× (suspension)	Report	1× (yellow card) 3× (suspension)	Telavi Sports Palace, Telavi; Attendance: 330; Referees: Xavier, Bragança (POR)

15 July 2025; 16:30	Slovakia	26−22	Kosovo	Telavi Sports Palace, Telavi; Attendance: 150; Referees: Kaplinsky, Pinker (ISR)
15 July 2025; 16:30	Beke, Letková 7	(14−13)	Gjergjaj 7	Telavi Sports Palace, Telavi; Attendance: 150; Referees: Kaplinsky, Pinker (ISR)
15 July 2025; 16:30	1× (yellow card) 7× (suspension)	Raeport	1× (yellow card) 4× (suspension)	Telavi Sports Palace, Telavi; Attendance: 150; Referees: Kaplinsky, Pinker (ISR)

16 July 2025; 12:30	Luxembourg	34−30	Great Britain	Telavi Sports Palace, Telavi; Attendance: 85; Referees: Kyriakou, Grapsas (GRE)
16 July 2025; 12:30	Mbuluku 9	(18−16)	Concar 9	Telavi Sports Palace, Telavi; Attendance: 85; Referees: Kyriakou, Grapsas (GRE)
16 July 2025; 12:30	6× (suspension)	Report	1× (yellow card) 3× (suspension)	Telavi Sports Palace, Telavi; Attendance: 85; Referees: Kyriakou, Grapsas (GRE)

16 July 2025; 14:30	Bulgaria	26−39	Belgium	Telavi Sports Palace, Telavi; Attendance: 75; Referees: Martin-Eckersall, Silva (GBR)
16 July 2025; 14:30	Skacikova 6	(11−15)	Collette, Put 8	Telavi Sports Palace, Telavi; Attendance: 75; Referees: Martin-Eckersall, Silva (GBR)
16 July 2025; 14:30	5× (suspension)	Report	4× (suspension) 1× (red card)	Telavi Sports Palace, Telavi; Attendance: 75; Referees: Martin-Eckersall, Silva (GBR)

16 July 2025; 16:30	Ukraine	33−24	Italy	Telavi Sports Palace, Telavi; Attendance: 165; Referees: Kaplinsky, Pinker (ISR)
16 July 2025; 16:30	Lakatosh, Rosokha 6	(15−10)	Zizzo 9	Telavi Sports Palace, Telavi; Attendance: 165; Referees: Kaplinsky, Pinker (ISR)
16 July 2025; 16:30	7× (suspension) 1× (red card)	Report	3× (suspension)	Telavi Sports Palace, Telavi; Attendance: 165; Referees: Kaplinsky, Pinker (ISR)

16 July 2025; 18:30	Georgia	19−30	Kosovo	Telavi Sports Palace, Telavi; Attendance: 310; Referees: Oganezov, Raidmets (EST)
16 July 2025; 18:30	Dzamunashvili 8	(10−17)	Dresh 10	Telavi Sports Palace, Telavi; Attendance: 310; Referees: Oganezov, Raidmets (EST)
16 July 2025; 18:30	5× (suspension)	Report	1× (yellow card) 5× (suspension)	Telavi Sports Palace, Telavi; Attendance: 310; Referees: Oganezov, Raidmets (EST)

16 July 2025; 20:30	Slovakia	30−17	Israel	Telavi Sports Palace, Telavi; Attendance: 90; Referees: Burič, Lovrić (SLO)
16 July 2025; 20:30	Lukačínová 7	(16−5)	Dagam, Elkayam 3	Telavi Sports Palace, Telavi; Attendance: 90; Referees: Burič, Lovrić (SLO)
16 July 2025; 20:30	1× (yellow card) 6× (suspension)	Report	7× (suspension) 1× (red card)	Telavi Sports Palace, Telavi; Attendance: 90; Referees: Burič, Lovrić (SLO)

== Knockout stage ==
=== 9–10 classification ===
9–10 classification
Georgia	29	32	60
Bulgaria	33	27	59

18 July 2025; 08:30	Georgia	29−33	Bulgaria	Telavi Sports Palace, Telavi; Attendance: 152; Referees: Burič, Lovrić (SLO)
18 July 2025; 08:30	Odikadze 7	(13−17)	Spasova 11	Telavi Sports Palace, Telavi; Attendance: 152; Referees: Burič, Lovrić (SLO)
18 July 2025; 08:30	1× (suspension)	Report	1× (yellow card) 4× (suspension)	Telavi Sports Palace, Telavi; Attendance: 152; Referees: Burič, Lovrić (SLO)

20 July 2025; 08:30	Bulgaria	27−32	Georgia	Telavi Sports Palace, Telavi; Attendance: 235; Referees: Martin-Eckersall, Silva (GBR)
20 July 2025; 08:30	Spasova 11	(16−19)	Odikadze 9	Telavi Sports Palace, Telavi; Attendance: 235; Referees: Martin-Eckersall, Silva (GBR)
20 July 2025; 08:30	4× (suspension)	Report	3× (suspension)	Telavi Sports Palace, Telavi; Attendance: 235; Referees: Martin-Eckersall, Silva (GBR)

Georgia won 60– 59on aggregate

=== 5–8 classification bracket ===
Semifinals
18 July 2025
Kosovo	35
Israel	26
18 July 2025
Luxembourg	33
Great Britain	24

5th place match
20 July 2025
Kosovo	25
Luxembourg	21
7th place match
20 July 2025
Israel	34
Great Britain	30

18 July 2025; 10:45	Kosovo	35−26	Israel	Telavi Sports Palace, Telavi; Attendance: 120; Referees: Kyriakou, Grapsas (GRE)
18 July 2025; 10:45	Bibaj 10	(17−10)	Lulu 6	Telavi Sports Palace, Telavi; Attendance: 120; Referees: Kyriakou, Grapsas (GRE)
18 July 2025; 10:45	7× (suspension)	Report	1× (yellow card) 7× (suspension)	Telavi Sports Palace, Telavi; Attendance: 120; Referees: Kyriakou, Grapsas (GRE)

18 July 2025; 13:00	Luxembourg	33−24	Great Britain	Telavi Sports Palace, Telavi; Attendance: 200; Referees: Kaplinsky, Pinker (ISR)
18 July 2025; 13:00	Ciufoli 8	(13−12)	Savidge King, Thomann 6	Telavi Sports Palace, Telavi; Attendance: 200; Referees: Kaplinsky, Pinker (ISR)
18 July 2025; 13:00	6× (suspension)	Report	2× (suspension)	Telavi Sports Palace, Telavi; Attendance: 200; Referees: Kaplinsky, Pinker (ISR)

==== Seventh place game ====
20 July 2025; 10:45	Israel	34−30	Great Britain	Telavi Sports Palace, Telavi; Attendance: 156; Referees: Xavier, Bragança (POR)
20 July 2025; 10:45	Lulu 7	(16−12)	Savidge King, Willis 10	Telavi Sports Palace, Telavi; Attendance: 156; Referees: Xavier, Bragança (POR)
20 July 2025; 10:45	3× (suspension)	Report	2× (suspension)	Telavi Sports Palace, Telavi; Attendance: 156; Referees: Xavier, Bragança (POR)

==== Fifth place game ====
20 July 2025; 13:00	Kosovo	25−21	Luxembourg	Telavi Sports Palace, Telavi; Attendance: 150; Referees: Kyriakou, Grapsas (GRE)
20 July 2025; 13:00	Imeraj 7	(12−10)	Ciufoli 5	Telavi Sports Palace, Telavi; Attendance: 150; Referees: Kyriakou, Grapsas (GRE)
20 July 2025; 13:00	2× (suspension)	Report	5× (suspension)	Telavi Sports Palace, Telavi; Attendance: 150; Referees: Kyriakou, Grapsas (GRE)

=== Knockout stage ===
Semifinals
18 July 2025
Slovakia	23
Italy	20
18 July 2025
Ukraine	35
Belgium	25

Final
20 July 2025
Slovakia	23
Ukraine	28
Third place
20 July 2025
Italy	32
Belgium	26

==== Semifinals ====
18 July 2025; 15:15	Slovakia	23−20	Italy	Telavi Sports Palace, Telavi; Attendance: 256; Referees: Xavier, Bragança (POR)
18 July 2025; 15:15	Lukačínová, Letková 6	(10−9)	Zizzo 5	Telavi Sports Palace, Telavi; Attendance: 256; Referees: Xavier, Bragança (POR)
18 July 2025; 15:15	3× (suspension) 1× (red card)	Report	1× (yellow card) 7× (suspension)	Telavi Sports Palace, Telavi; Attendance: 256; Referees: Xavier, Bragança (POR)

18 July 2025; 17:30	Ukraine	35−25	Belgium	Telavi Sports Palace, Telavi; Attendance: 103; Referees: Oganezov, Raidmets (EST)
18 July 2025; 17:30	Lakatosh 11	(21−12)	Huygen, Peeters, Put 4	Telavi Sports Palace, Telavi; Attendance: 103; Referees: Oganezov, Raidmets (EST)
18 July 2025; 17:30	2× (suspension)	Report	6× (suspension)	Telavi Sports Palace, Telavi; Attendance: 103; Referees: Oganezov, Raidmets (EST)

==== Third place game ====
20 July 2025; 15:15	Italy	32−26	Belgium	Telavi Sports Palace, Telavi; Attendance: 326; Referees: Oganezov, Raidmets (EST)
20 July 2025; 15:15	Falser 7	(11−14)	van Trier 5	Telavi Sports Palace, Telavi; Attendance: 326; Referees: Oganezov, Raidmets (EST)
20 July 2025; 15:15		Raport	2× (suspension)	Telavi Sports Palace, Telavi; Attendance: 326; Referees: Oganezov, Raidmets (EST)

==== Final ====
20 July 2025; 17:30	Slovakia	23−28	Ukraine	Telavi Sports Palace, Telavi; Attendance: 800; Referees: Kaplinsky, Pinker (ISR)
20 July 2025; 17:30	Lukačínová 8	(9−14)	Parhomenko 7	Telavi Sports Palace, Telavi; Attendance: 800; Referees: Kaplinsky, Pinker (ISR)
20 July 2025; 17:30	2× (yellow card) 6× (suspension)	Report	6× (suspension) 1× (red card)	Telavi Sports Palace, Telavi; Attendance: 800; Referees: Kaplinsky, Pinker (ISR)

== Final ranking ==
Rank	Team
1st place, gold medalist(s)	Ukraine
2nd place, silver medalist(s)	Slovakia
3rd place, bronze medalist(s)	Italy
4	Belgium
5	Kosovo
6	Luxembourg
7	Israel
8	Great Britain
9	Georgia
10	Bulgaria

=== Top goalscorers ===
Rank	Name	Tean	Goals
1	Melina Spasova	Bulgaria	54
2	Laura Ciufoli	Luxembourg	47
3	Vanessa Lakatosh	Ukraine	39
3	Michaela Lukačínová	Slovakia	39
5	Natalie Falser	Italy	38
5	Stela Skacikova	Bulgaria	38
7	Grace Concar	Great Britain	37
7	Yade Put	Belgium	37
9	Nina Letková	Slovakia	36
9	Daniella Savidge King	Great Britain	36

=== Prizes ===
The team of the tournament was announced on 20 July 2025

Player of the Tournament (MVP)

- Liubov Rosoha (UKR)

Top goalscorer

- Melina Spasova (BUL) (54 goals)

Best Defender

- Anastasia Parhomenko (UKR)

The team of the European Championship

- Goalkeeper: Margherita Danti (ITA)
- Left wing: Nina Letková (SVK)
- Left back: Vanessa Lakatosh (UKR)
- Centre back: Liubov Rosokha (UKR)
- Line player: Yade Put (BEL)
- Right back: Anne Mopibo Mbuluku (LUX)
- Right wing: Chiara Priolo (ITA)

== See also ==
- 2025 European Women's U-19 Handball Championship
- 2025 European Women's U-17 Handball Championship
- 2025 Women's U-17 EHF Championship
