= Slovak Handball Federation =

Governing body of handball in Slovakia

Slovak Handball Federation Slovak: Slovenský Zväz Hádzanej SZH
- IOC nation: Slovakia (SVK)
- Sport: Handball
- Other sports: Beach handball
- Official website: www.slovakhandball.sk

HISTORY
- Year of formation: 1993; 33 years ago

AFFILIATIONS
- International federation: International Handball Federation (IHF)
- IHF member since: 1993
- Continental association: European Handball Federation
- National Olympic Committee: Slovak Olympic and Sports Committee

GOVERNING BODY
- President: Jaroslav Holeša

HEADQUARTERS
- Address: Trnavska cesta 37 83104 Bratislava 3
- Country: Slovakia
- Secretary General: Ivan Sabovik

The Slovak Handball Federation (Slovak: Slovenský Zväz Hádzanej) (SZH) is the administrative and controlling body for handball and beach handball in Slovakia. Founded in 1993, SZH is a member of European Handball Federation (EHF) and the International Handball Federation (IHF).

== National teams ==
- Slovakia men's national handball team
- Slovakia men's national junior handball team
- Slovakia women's national handball team
- Slovakia women's national youth handball team

== Competitions ==
- Slovenská hadzanárska extraliga
- Women Handball International League
