= 2022 IHF Beach Handball Global Tour =

Tournament details
- Venue(s): 4

The 2022 Beach Handball Global Tour is the first season of the Beach Handball Global Tour, an elite Beach handball circuit organized by the International Handball Federation (IHF)

== Men's tour ==
=== Summary ===
Stage	Host	1st place	2nd place	3rd place	4th place
1; 1–2 july	(Poland); Gdańsk	Croatia	Germany	Poland	Spain
2; 29–31 july	(Spain); Orihuela				
3					
4					

== Women's tour ==
=== Summary ===
Stage	Host	1st place	2nd place	3rd place	4th place
1; 1–2 july	(Poland); Gdańsk	Spain	Germany	Croatia	Poland
2; 29–31 july	(Spain); Orihuela				
3					
4					
