= 2025 Women's U-17 EHF Championship =

Tournament details
- Host country: Kosovo
- City: Pristina
- Venue: 1 (in 1 host city)
- Dates: 4–10 August 2025
- Teams: 8 (from 1 confederation)

Final positions
- Champions: Italy
- Runners-up: Finland
- Third place: Ukraine

Tournament statistics
- Matches played: 20

Official website
- www.eurohandball.com

The 2025 Women's U-17 EHF Championship was played in Pristina, Kosovo, from 4 to 10 August 2025.

== Teams ==
- Bulgaria
- Finland
- Great Britain
- Israel
- Italy
- Kosovo
- Latvia
- Ukraine

== Venue ==
As the larger arena is being renovated, the tournament was held in the smaller arena.

2025 Women's U-17 EHF Championship is located in Kosovo	Pristina
2025 Women's U-17 EHF Championship is located in Kosovo	Palace of Youth and Sports (smaller arena)
2025 Women's U-17 EHF Championship is located in Kosovo	Capacity: 2,800

== Draw ==
The draw was held on 28 January 2025 in Vienna at 11:00 (CET). The draw was conducted by EHF Secretary General, Martin Hausleitner, and Chief Sports Officer, Markus Glaser. As hosts, Kosovo had the right to select their group.

Pot 1	Pot 2	Pot 3	Pot 4
Finland; Italy	Israel; Kosovo	Ukraine; Latvia	Bulgaria; Great Britain

== Preliminary round ==
=== Group A ===
Pos	Team	Pld	W	D	L	GF	GA	GD	Pts	Qualification
1	Finland	3	3	0	0	124	81	+43	6	Semifinals
2	Bulgaria	3	2	0	1	103	98	+5	4	Semifinals
3	Latvia	3	1	0	2	86	111	−25	2	5th–8th place playoffs
4	Kosovo (H)	3	0	0	3	82	105	−23	0	5th–8th place playoffs

Source: EHF
Rules for classification: 1) points; 2) head-to-head points; 3) head-to-head goal difference; 4) head-to-head number of goals scored; 5) goal difference.
(H) Hosts

4 August 2025; 16:45	Finland	46–25	Latvia	Palace of Youth and Sports, Pristina
4 August 2025; 16:45		(23–13)		Palace of Youth and Sports, Pristina
4 August 2025; 16:45		Report		Palace of Youth and Sports, Pristina

4 August 2025; 19:15	Kosovo	29–35	Bulgaria	Palace of Youth and Sports, Pristina
4 August 2025; 19:15		(16–16)		Palace of Youth and Sports, Pristina
4 August 2025; 19:15		Report		Palace of Youth and Sports, Pristina

5 August 2025; 16:45	Latvia	29–39	Bulgaria	Palace of Youth and Sports, Pristina
5 August 2025; 16:45		(12–22)		Palace of Youth and Sports, Pristina
5 August 2025; 16:45		Report		Palace of Youth and Sports, Pristina

5 August 2025; 19:00	Finland	38–27	Kosovo	Palace of Youth and Sports, Pristina
5 August 2025; 19:00		(20–10)		Palace of Youth and Sports, Pristina
5 August 2025; 19:00		Report		Palace of Youth and Sports, Pristina

7 August 2025; 16:45	Bulgaria	29–40	Finland	Palace of Youth and Sports, Pristina
7 August 2025; 16:45		(15–22)		Palace of Youth and Sports, Pristina
7 August 2025; 16:45		Report		Palace of Youth and Sports, Pristina

7 August 2025; 19:00	Kosovo	26–32	Latvia	Palace of Youth and Sports, Pristina
7 August 2025; 19:00		(11–13)		Palace of Youth and Sports, Pristina
7 August 2025; 19:00		Report		Palace of Youth and Sports, Pristina

=== Group B ===
Pos	Team	Pld	W	D	L	GF	GA	GD	Pts	Qualification
1	Italy	3	3	0	0	105	67	+38	6	Semifinals
2	Ukraine	3	2	0	1	80	71	+9	4	Semifinals
3	Israel	3	1	0	2	93	78	+15	2	5th–8th place playoffs
4	Great Britain	3	0	0	3	53	115	−62	0	5th–8th place playoffs

Source: EHF
Rules for classification: 1) points; 2) head-to-head points; 3) head-to-head goal difference; 4) head-to-head number of goals scored; 5) goal difference.

4 August 2025; 12:15	Israel	37–20	Great Britain	Palace of Youth and Sports, Pristina
4 August 2025; 12:15		(22–8)		Palace of Youth and Sports, Pristina
4 August 2025; 12:15		Report		Palace of Youth and Sports, Pristina

4 August 2025; 14:30	Italy	26–23	Ukraine	Palace of Youth and Sports, Pristina
4 August 2025; 14:30		(14–10)		Palace of Youth and Sports, Pristina
4 August 2025; 14:30		Report		Palace of Youth and Sports, Pristina

5 August 2025; 12:15	Ukraine	30–19	Great Britain	Palace of Youth and Sports, Pristina
5 August 2025; 12:15		(11–10)		Palace of Youth and Sports, Pristina
5 August 2025; 12:15		Report		Palace of Youth and Sports, Pristina

5 August 2025; 14:30	Italy	31–30	Israel	Palace of Youth and Sports, Pristina
5 August 2025; 14:30		(15–16)		Palace of Youth and Sports, Pristina
5 August 2025; 14:30		Report		Palace of Youth and Sports, Pristina

7 August 2025; 12:15	Great Britain	14–48	Italy	Palace of Youth and Sports, Pristina
7 August 2025; 12:15		(5–22)		Palace of Youth and Sports, Pristina
7 August 2025; 12:15		Report		Palace of Youth and Sports, Pristina

7 August 2025; 14:30	Israel	26–27	Ukraine	Palace of Youth and Sports, Pristina
7 August 2025; 14:30		(13–11)		Palace of Youth and Sports, Pristina
7 August 2025; 14:30		Report		Palace of Youth and Sports, Pristina

== 5th–8th place playoffs ==
5th–8th place semifinals
9 August
A3 Latvia	30
B4 Great Britain	25
9 August
B3 Israel	37
A4 Kosovo	29

5th place match
10 August
A3 Latvia	40
B3 Israel	42
7th place match
10 August
B4 Great Britain	22
A4 Kosovo	35

=== 5th–8th place semifinals ===
9 August 2025; 12:15	Latvia	30–25	Great Britain	Palace of Youth and Sports, Pristina
9 August 2025; 12:15		Report		Palace of Youth and Sports, Pristina

9 August 2025; 14:30	Israel	37–29	Kosovo	Palace of Youth and Sports, Pristina
9 August 2025; 14:30		Report		Palace of Youth and Sports, Pristina

=== 7th place match ===
10 August 2025; 12:15	Great Britain	22–35	Kosovo	Palace of Youth and Sports, Pristina
10 August 2025; 12:15		(9–22)		Palace of Youth and Sports, Pristina
10 August 2025; 12:15		Report		Palace of Youth and Sports, Pristina

=== 5th place match ===
10 August 2025
14:30
Latvia
40–42
Israel
Palace of Youth and Sports, Pristina

(22–19)

Report

FT: 37–37 Pen: 3–5

== Championship playoffs ==
Semifinals
9 August
A1 Finland	32
B2 Ukraine	31
9 August
B1 Italy	33
A2 Bulgaria	30

Final
10 August
A1 Finland	34
B1 Italy	38
3rd place match
10 August
B2 Ukraine	36
A2 Bulgaria	29

=== Semifinals ===
9 August 2025; 16:45	Finland	32–31	Ukraine	Palace of Youth and Sports, Pristina
9 August 2025; 16:45		Report		Palace of Youth and Sports, Pristina

9 August 2025; 19:00	Italy	33–30	Bulgaria	Palace of Youth and Sports, Pristina
9 August 2025; 19:00		Report		Palace of Youth and Sports, Pristina

=== 3rd place match ===
10 August 2025; 16:45	Ukraine	36–29	Bulgaria	Palace of Youth and Sports, Pristina
10 August 2025; 16:45		(17–15)		Palace of Youth and Sports, Pristina
10 August 2025; 16:45		Report		Palace of Youth and Sports, Pristina

=== Final ===
10 August 2025; 19:00	Finland	34–38	Italy	Palace of Youth and Sports, Pristina
10 August 2025; 19:00		(16–15)		Palace of Youth and Sports, Pristina
10 August 2025; 19:00		Report		Palace of Youth and Sports, Pristina

== Final standings ==
Rank	Team
1st place, gold medalist(s)	Italy
2nd place, silver medalist(s)	Finland
3rd place, bronze medalist(s)	Ukraine
4	Bulgaria
5	Israel
6	Latvia
7	Kosovo
8	Great Britain

== See also ==
- 2025 Women's U-19 EHF Championship
- 2025 European Women's U-17 Handball Championship
- 2025 European Women's U-19 Handball Championship
