= EHF Nations' Cup =

International handball competition

The Nations' Cup was held in 2003 for men and 2001 for women. The Nations’ Cup was a one-off event organised on the occasion of the 10th anniversary of the EHF.

== Men's tournament ==
Year	Final			Third Place Match		
Year	Champion	Score	Second Place	Third Place	Score	Fourth Place
2003	Denmark	37–29	Yugoslavia	France	34–29	Sweden

== Women's tournament ==
Year	Final			Third Place Match		
Year	Champion	Score	Second Place	Third Place	Score	Fourth Place
2001	Norway	24–21	Hungary	Denmark	27–17	Austria
