= Slovakia women's national youth handball team =

Slovakia

Information
- Association: Slovak Handball Federation
- Coach: Pavol Streicher

Colours
1st	2nd

Results

IHF U-18 World Championship
- Appearances: 5 (First in 2008)
- Best result: 6th (2026)

European Championship
- Appearances: 12 (First in 1994)
- Best result: (gold) 1st (2025)
- Last updated on Unknown.

The Slovakia women's youth national handball team is the national under–18 Handball team of Slovakia.

Controlled by the Slovak Handball Federation it represents the country in international matches. It competes in the IHF U18 Handball World Championship (called the Women's Youth (U18) World Championship) and the European U-17 Handball Championship (also called the W17 EHF EURO).

The team has won the W17 EHF EURO in 2025.

The current head coach of the team is Pavol Streicher.

The team is referred as the "U18" and "U18F".

== History ==
=== IHF World Championship ===
Champions Runners up Third place Fourth place

IHF Youth World Championship record
Year	Round	Position	GP	W	D	L	GS	GA	GD
(Canada) 2006	Did Not Qualify								
(Slovakia) 2008	Main Round	7th	6	3	0	3	169	138	+31
(Dominican Republic) 2010	Did Not Qualify								
(Montenegro) 2012	Did Not Qualify								
(North Macedonia) 2014	Did Not Qualify								
(Slovakia) 2016	Round of 16	13th	7	4	0	3	179	173	+6
(Poland) 2018	Preliminary Round	19th	7	1	1	5	160	181	−21
(Croatia) 2020	Cancelled								
(Georgia (country)) 2022	Preliminary Round	26th	7	2	0	5	198	213	−15
(China) 2024	Did Not Qualify								
(Romania) 2026	Quarterfinals	6th	8	5	0	3	249	206	+43
Total	5 / 10	0 Titles	35	15	1	19	955	911	+44

=== European Championship ===
Champions Runners up Third place Fourth place

European Championship record
Year	Round	Position	GP	W	D	L	GS	GA	GD
(Hungary) 1992	Part of Czechoslovakia								
(Lithuania) 1994	Preliminary Round	7th	6	3	0	3	127	120	+7
(Austria) 1997	Did Not Qualify								
(Germany) 1999	Preliminary Round	11th	6	2	0	4	118	131	−13
(Turkey) 2001	Did Not Qualify								
(Russia) 2003	Did Not Qualify								
(Austria) 2005	Main Round	5th	7	4	0	3	183	183	0
(Slovakia) 2007	Main Round	7th	7	3	0	4	175	182	−7
(Serbia) 2009	Intermediate Round	13th	7	2	0	5	165	192	−27
(Czech Republic) 2011	Intermediate Round	16th	7	0	0	7	143	197	−54
(Poland) 2013	Intermediate Round	16th	7	1	0	6	158	208	−50
(North Macedonia) 2015	Intermediate Round	14th	7	2	0	5	172	198	−26
(Slovakia) 2017	Intermediate Round	12th	7	2	1	4	155	169	−14
(Slovenia) 2019	Intermediate Round	12th	7	2	0	5	170	198	−28
(Montenegro) 2021	Intermediate Round	15th	7	2	1	4	144	204	−60
(Montenegro) 2023	Did Not Qualify								
(Montenegro) 2025	Final	Champions	8	6	1	1	225	198	+27
Total	11/ 15	1 Title							

== Individual awards ==
=== 2025 Women's U-17 European Handball Championship ===
All-Star Team

- Left back: Mária Bartková
- Defender: Liliana Gogová
