= Handball in India =

- Country: India
- Governing body: Handball Association of India
- National teams: India men's national handball team India women's national handball team India national wheelchair handball team India national beach handball team
- First played: 1972; 54 years ago

Club competitions
- Premier Handball League (formerly); Handball Pro League

Handball in India is controlled by the Handball Association of India. It was founded by Jagat Singh Lohan from Rohtak, Haryana, who was an alumnus of YMCA College of Physical Education of Madras. His efforts during Munich Olympics helped in establishing HFI. The member states were Andhra Pradesh, Uttar Pradesh, Haryana, Vidharbha and Jammu and Kashmir. He was also elected as the first secretary general of the HFI.

The first senior men's national handball championship was held at Sir Chhotu Ram Stadium, Rohtak, in 1972. Indian handball team first participated in the Asian championship held in Nanjing in 1979.

== Performance record ==
=== Asian Championships ===
India started participating in the Asian Men's Handball Championship in 1979 and the Asian Women's Handball Championship in 1993.

Category	Best rank	Total teams	Year	Host
Men	5th	5	1979	China
Women	6th	7	2000	China
U-21 men	8th	11	2006	Japan
U-20 women	5th	7	2000	Bangladesh
U-19 men	6th	12	2018	Jordan
U-18 women	5th	5	2005	Thailand

=== Asian Games ===
Indian men's handball team first participated in the Asian Games in 1982 when the event was hosted in New Delhi. Women's team debuted in 2006, held at Doha.

Event	Best rank	Total teams	Year	Host
Men	8th	8	1982	India
Women	8th	9	2014	South Korea

=== South Asian Games ===
Indian men's handball team is the second best team of Asian Games, after Pakistan. Men's team debuted in 2010 and won silver medal, losing to Pakistan in the final by 37–31. In the 2016 edition, India got their revenge when they hosted the event in Guwahati, narrowly defeating Pakistan by 32–31. In the 2019 edition, Pakistan dethroned India beating them in Kathmandu by 30–29.

Indian women's handball team is the best team of South Asia, winning editions in 2016 and 2019, defeating Bangladesh and hosts Nepal respectively.

Event	Best rank	Total teams	Year	Host
Men	1st	6	2016	India
Women	1st	6	2019	Nepal
