= Handball Association of India =

Administrative and controlling body for handball in India

- Sport: Handball
- Jurisdiction: India
- Membership: 43
- Abbreviation: HAI
- Affiliation: International Handball Federation
- Regional affiliation: Asian Handball Federation
- Sub-regional affiliation: South Asian Handball Federation
- Headquarters: Lucknow, India
- President: Digvijay Chautala
- Secretary: Tejraj Singh
- Replaced: Handball Federation of India (youth, wheelchair, developmental events)
- (India)

Handball Association of India is the governing body for handball in India. HAI is a member of the Asian Handball Federation and the International Handball Federation. It is also a member of the Commonwealth Handball Association and the South Asian Handball Federation.

== History ==
HAI replaced the Handball Federation of India as the official handball governing body in 2023. HFI was founded by Jagat Singh Chauhan from Rohtak (Haryana) who was an alumnus of YMCA College of Physical Education of Madras Chennai. He was also the first secretary general of HFI.

The 1st Senior National Handball Championship was held at Sir Chhotu Ram Stadium, Rohtak, in the year 1972. Haryana won the gold medal and Vidharba got the silver medal.

=== Presidents ===
No.	Name	State	Tenure
1	Laxmi Chhabra		1973 – 1976
2	AVM Harkrishan Lal Kapur, PVSM AVSM MP	Uttar Pradesh	1976 – 1985
3	Roshan Lal Anand	Punjab	1985 – 1 February 2010
4	Sarwan Singh Channy, IAS	Punjab	1 February 2010 – 22 December 2013
5	M. Ramasubramani, IPS	Tamil Nadu	22 December 2013 – 1 November 2020
6	Arishnapallly Jagan Mohan Rao	Telangana	1 November 2020 – 14 August 2022
7	Digvijay Chautala	Haryana	14 August 2022 – present

=== General secretaries ===
No.	Name	State	Tenure
1.	Jagat Singh Chauhan	Haryana	1972 – 1973
2.	M. I. Khan	Andhra Pradesh	1973 – 1985
3.	Surinder Mohan Bali	Jammu and Kashmir	1985 – 22 December 2013
4.	Anandeshwar Panday	Uttar Pradesh	22 December 2013 – 1 November 2020
5.	Tejpratap singh	Rajasthan	1 November 2020 – present

=== Executive committee ===
Following is the HFI Executive committee for the term 2022 – 2025.

Designation	Name	State
Life-president (Note: Life-President, Chairman and the Executive Director donot have voting right in the Executive Committee or Annual General Body Meeting(s).)	Roshan Lal Anand	Punjab
President	Digvijay Chautala	Haryana
Sr. vice-president	Pradeep Kumar Balmuchu	Jharkhand
Vice-president	Braj Kishore Sharma	Bihar
Vice-president	Nassarudeen Musali	Kerala
Vice-president	Yogesh Mehta	Delhi
Secretary general	Pritpal Singh Saluja	Madhya Pradesh
Joint secretary	Nand Kishore Sharma	Himachal Pradesh
Joint secretary	Randhir Singh	Maharashtra
Joint secretary	Shyamla Pavan Kumar	Telangana
Joint secretary	Varuni Negi	Delhi
Treasurer	Gursharan Singh Gill	Punjab
Executive member	Ravinder Singh	Chandigarh
Executive member	Rama Shankar Sharma	Uttarakhand
Executive member	Birendra Kumar Behera	Odisha
Executive member	Jile Singh	Dadra and Nagar Haveli
Executive member	Ashutosh Sharma	Jammu and Kashmir

=== Head coaches ===
The following are the head coaches of the Indian national handball teams:

Category	Head coach	State
Handball
Men	Vinod Kumar	Services Sports Control Board
Women	Mohinder Lal	Sports Authority of India
Junior men	Hassan Imam	Jharkhand
Junior women	Sunil Kumar	Chandigarh
Youth men	Praveen Kumar Singh	Sports Authority of India
Youth women	Arvind Kumar Yadav	Railways Sports Promotion Board
Beach handball
Men	Inderjeet Singh Randhawa	Punjab
Women	Priyadeep Singh	Rajasthan
Youth men	Inderjeet Singh Randhawa	Punjab
Youth women	Ziarul Rahaman Mondal	West Bengal
Wheelchair handball
Wheelchair handball	Anand Bajirao Mane	Maharashtra

=== Competitions hosted ===
HFI had hosted following international championships:

Championship	Venue
2019 Asian Women's Youth Handball Championship	Jaipur
2017 Asian Men's Club League Handball Championship	Hyderabad
2016 South Asian Games	Guwahati
2015 Asian Women's Youth Handball Championship	New Delhi
2004 Asian Men's Junior Handball Championship	Hyderabad
1982 Asian Games	New Delhi

== Affiliated members ==
State associations

1. Andhra Pradesh Handball Association
2. Arunachal Pradesh Handball Association
3. Assam Handball Association
4. Bihar Handball Association
5. Chhattisgarh Handball Association
6. Goa Handball Association
7. Gujarat Handball Association
8. Haryana State Handball Association
9. Himachal Pradesh Handball Association
10. Jharkhand State Handball Association
11. Karnataka Handball Association
12. Kerala Handball Association
13. Madhya Pradesh Handball Association
14. Handball Association of Maharashtra
15. Manipur Handball Association
16. Meghalaya Handball Association
17. Mizoram Handball Association
18. Nagaland Handball Association
19. Odisha State Handball Association
20. Punjab Handball Association
21. Rajasthan State Handball Association
22. Sikkim Handball Association
23. Tamil Nadu Handball Association, Chennai
24. Telangana Handball Association
25. Tripura Handball Association
26. Uttar Pradesh Handball Association
27. Uttarakhand Handball Association
28. West Bengal State Handball Association

Union territories associations

1. Andaman and Nicobar Islands Handball Association
2. Chandigarh Handball Association
3. Handball Association of Dadra and Nagar Haveli and Daman and Diu
4. Handball Association of Delhi
5. Handball Association of Union Territory of Ladakh
6. Jammu and Kashmir Handball Association
7. Lakshadweep Handball Association
8. Pondicherry State Handball Association

Other units

1. Association of Indian Universities
2. Central Industrial Security Force
3. Central Reserve Police Force
4. Mumbai Handball Academy
5. National Handball Academy
6. Railways Sports Promotion Board
7. Services Sports Control Board
8. Sports Authority of India

== National teams ==
- India men's national handball team
- India women's national handball team

== See also ==
- Premier Handball League
- Handball Federation of India
