= Muhammad Shafiq =

Muhammad Shafiq (Pakistan)
- Urdu: محمد شفیق

3rd Secretary General of Asian Handball Federation
- Incumbent
- Assumed office 25 October 2013
- President: Sheikh Ahmed Al-Fahad Al-Ahmed Al-Sabah (Kuwait)
- Preceded by: Dr. Roshan Lal Anand (India)

Treasurer of Pakistan Olympic Association
- Incumbent
- Assumed office 4 February 2012
- President: Syed Arif Hasan
- Preceded by: Major Muhammad Afzal

3rd President of Pakistan Handball Federation
- Incumbent
- Assumed office December 2012
- Preceded by: Syed Muhammad Abid Qadri

1st & 3rd Secretary General of Pakistan Handball Federation
- In office February 2007 – December 2012
- President: Syed Muhammad Abid Qadri
- Preceded by: Muhammad Saleem Akhter
- Succeeded by: Khalid Rashid
- In office April 1985 – December 2004
- President: Ahsan Alam
- Preceded by: Position created
- Succeeded by: Muhammad Fahim

Personal details
- Born: November 11, 1953 (age 72) Lyallpur, West Punjab, Dominion of Pakistan (present-day Faisalabad, Punjab, Pakistan)
- Education: M. Sc. in Health and Physical Education, M. Sc. in Rural Sociology, Sports Specialisation Course (Athletics Coach)
- Alma mater: University of the Punjab; University of Agriculture, Faisalabad; University of Mainz; Gomal University
- Profession: Sports administrator
- Awards: IHF Badge of Merit in Gold (2009)
- Religion: Sunni Islam

Muhammad Shafiq (Urdu: محمد شفیق; born 11 November 1953) is a Pakistani sports administrator and former track and field sprinter. He is 3rd and current Secretary General of Asian Handball Federation (AHF) since 25 October 2013. He is also holds the position of President in Pakistan Handball Federation since 2012.

== Early life and education ==
Muhammad Shafiq was born on 11 November 1953 in Lyallpur, Dominion of Pakistan (now Faisalabad, Pakistan). He started both his educational and athletics career from Muslim High School, Tariqabad, Lyallpur where he completed his secondary school in 1970. After that he got enrolled to Government Degree College, Lyallpur where first he completed his higher secondary education in 1972 and after that obtained his bachelor's degree in 1975. The college was then affiliated with University of the Punjab, Lahore.

He completed his Master of Science degree in Rural Sociology from University of Agriculture, Faisalabad in 1981 and his Master of Science degree in Health and Physical Education from Gomal University, Dera Ismail Khan in 1990. He had also done a Sports Specialization Course (Athletics trainer) from Johannes Gutenberg University Mainz, Germany in 1982.

== Sports administration ==
=== Asian Handball Federation ===
Shafiq entered Asian Handball Federation (AHF) in 1986, he previously held the position of member in AHF Development & Publicity Commission (1992 – 1996) and AHF Playing Rules and Referees Commission (1996 – 2000) before being elected to AHF Council as Chairman of AHF Under Development Countries Commission (2004 – 2009) and then as Chairman of AHF Commission of Youth and School Handball (2009 – 2013). On 25 October 2013, he succeeded Indian sports administrator Dr. Roshan Lal Anand and was elected as AHF Secretary General.

=== Pakistan Handball Federation ===
Shafiq is founder of handball in Pakistan. He is also the co-founder of Pakistan Handball Federation (PHF) in April 1985 and was elected as its Secretary General. He is the longest serving PHF Secretary General, holding the position for 24 years from 1985 – 2004 and then from 2007 – 2012. Currently, he is PHF President since December 2012. Under his leadership, the performance of Pakistan men's national handball team and Pakistan national beach handball team are at their best as they won many medals which include gold medal in 2nd edition of Asian Beach Handball Championship 2007 held at Bandar Abbas, gold medal in 1st Asian Beach Games 2008 held at Bali, and gold medals in 2010 and 2019 editions of the South Asian Games.

=== Others ===
Shafiq also held various positions in other sports federations which has included Treasurer of Pakistan Olympic Association since February 2012 to date. He was elected as Vice-President (1991 – 2000; 2009 – 2013) and Secretary General (2000 – 2009) of South Asian Handball Federation. He is a member of Working Group of Commonwealth Handball Association and National Course Director of Pakistan NOC. He is also a member of International Track and Field Coaches Association since 1985.

== Personal life and occupation ==
Shafiq is married and has one wife and four children, two daughters and two sons. He is fluent in English, Urdu and Punjabi and also speaks a little bit of German.

In 1978, he joined National Bank of Pakistan and served there till 1981. In 1981, he was appointed national athletics coach at Pakistan Sports Board where he served till his resignation in 1983. In June 1985, he started serving as Assistant Director of Sports at University of Agriculture, Faisalabad. In December 1990, he was promoted to Director of Sports and served in this position till his retirement on 10 November 2013. During his tenure University of Agriculture, Faisalabad won All-Pakistan Inter-Universities Sports Championships All Round Trophy (Men) in 2005.

== Athletics career ==
Shafiq was a renowned middle distance athlete of Pakistan in the late 1970s up to his retirement in mid 1980s, winning various medals in National Games of Pakistan and other International tournaments. He also participated in World Masters Athletics Championships after retirement from athletics. Following table shows his achievements in the athletics:

Competition	Event	Venue	Position	Ref.
1976 National Games of Pakistan	3000m SC	(Pakistan) Karachi	Gold Medal	
1977 National Athletics Championship	3000m SC	(Pakistan) Peshawar	Silver medal	
1978 National Athletics Championship	3000m SC	(Pakistan) Lahore	Silver medal	
1979 National Athletics Championship	3000m SC	(Pakistan) Rawalpindi	Silver medal	
1980 National Games of Pakistan	1500 metres	(Pakistan) Karachi	Gold medal	
1980 National Games of Pakistan	3000m SC	(Pakistan) Karachi	Gold medal	
1981 International Sports Festival	3000m SC	(Germany) Prien am Chiemsee	Gold medal	
1995 World Masters Athletics Championships	800 metres	(United States) Buffalo	1st in Asia	
1999 World Masters Athletics Championships	800 metres	(United Kingdom) Gateshead	1st in Asia	
2001 World Masters Athletics Championships	1500 metres	(Australia) Brisbane	1st in Asia	

He was also appointed coach-cum-manager of Pakistan Athletics team for 3 three months training-cum-competition tour of Germany in 1982 during which Habib Shah equalled Pakistan's 100 metres national record with the timing of 10.4 seconds and Muhammad Rashid Khan created new national record in Javelin throw with the distance of 76.36 m.
