= Handball at the 2019 South Asian Games =

- Venue: 1
- Dates: December 4, 2019–December 9, 2019
- Nations: 6

The Handball event at the 2019 South Asian Games was held at the Pokhara Covered Hall, Pokhara (Nepal) from 4 to 9 December 2019. Six teams each participated in the men's and women's competitions.

== Medalists ==
Event	Gold	Silver	Bronze
Men	Pakistan: 1. Ali Asif; 2. Hussain Muzammal; 3. Bashir Muhammad Sahid; 4. Saeed Asim; 5. Ali Muaaz; 6. Zubair Muhammad; 7. Hussain Hazrat; 8. Hussain Umar; 9. Hayat Asif; 10. Hussain Nasir; 11. Naveed-ur-Rehman; 12. Atif Muhammad Uzair; 13. Khan Imran; 14. Ashraf Muhammad Mubeen	India: 1. Punia Naveen; 2. Ramesh Chand; 3. Ankit; 4. Naveen; 5. Sombir; 6. Singh Naveen; 7. Happy; 8. Tinku; 9. Dinesh; 10. Karamjeet Singh; 11. Ahlawat Deepak; 12. Navdeep; 13. Sukhveer Singh; 14. Lucky; 15. Vijay Singh; 16. Yadav Mohit	Sri Lanka: 1. Amarasingha Sanjeewa Mahesh; 2. Pallawattage Prabath Madushanka; 3. Koswaththa Muhamdiram Ralalage Sanjeewa Sampath Bandara; 4. Hettigodage Anila Dasantha Hetigoda; 5. Rathnayaka Mudiyanselage Nadeera Rathnayake; 6. Weerakodi Harsha Prasad De Silva; 7. Nawarathna Mudiyanselage Amith Nishantha Nawarathna; 8. Mannapperuma Mudiyanaselage Namal Sanjeewa Adhikari; 9. Demuni Nuwan Jayasinghe; 10. Herath Mudiyanselage Ishara Bandara Ekanayaka; 11. Muthuwahandi Sajith lakshan Sirkantha; 12. Dissanayaka Mudiyanselage Ravindra Dissanayaka; 13. Wijendra Axcharige Chanaka Pradeep Wijendra; 14. Meneripitiya Weerasingha Acharige Priyantha Weerasingha; 15. Arambawattage Sudesh Kumara Priyadarshana; 16. Thilakrathna Mudiyanselage Pradeep Kumara Thilakarathna
Women	India: 1. Shil Nina; 2. Singh Shiva; 3. Dikshya Kumari; 4. Pathak K M Majhula; 5. Sharma Nidhi; 6. Deepshikha; 7. Menika; 8. Thakur Shalini; 9. Kumar Khushbu; 10. Thakur Priyanka; 11. Jaiswal Swarnima; 12. Shukla Jyoti; 13. Uma; 14. Sonika; 15. Gurjar Prachi; 16. Kumar Santhiya	Nepal: 1. Ram Kumari Chaudhary; 2. Kabita Rai; 3. Durga Bohora; 4. Shantikala Rai; 5. Dev Kumari Baskota; 6. Babita Shrestha; 7. Sharda B.K.; 8. Uma Rai; 9. Bandana Rai; 10. Sangita Chaudhary; 11. Nisha Rai; 12. Ranjana Rai; 13. Jhin Maya Thapa; 14. Archana Neupane; 15. Kalpana Oli; 16. Aaita Lamhu Shrepa	Bangladesh: 1. Akther Most Silpi; 2. Akter Mosammat Masuda; 3. Begum mst Maina; 4. Begum Mosammat Rubina; 5. Sifa Mosammat; 6. Akter Most Najira; 7. Bagum Sumy; 8. Akter Shirina; 9. Jahan Nur; 10. Rani Purnima; 11. Biswas Falguni; 12. Sultana Khaleda; 13. Khatun Khadiza; 14. Eva Mst Esrat Jahan; 15. Akter Alpona; 16. Begum Mst Sonia

== Medal table ==
Rank	Nation	Gold	Silver	Bronze	Total
1	India (IND)	1	1	0	2
2	Pakistan (PAK)	1	0	0	1
3	Nepal (NEP)	0	1	0	1
4	Bangladesh (BAN)	0	0	1	1
4	Sri Lanka (SRI)	0	0	1	1
Totals (5 entries)		2	2	2	6

== Draw ==
=== Men ===
Group A	Group B
India Bangladesh Maldives	Pakistan Nepal Sri Lanka

=== Women ===
Group A	Group B
India Pakistan Maldives	Bangladesh Nepal Sri Lanka
