= Handball at the 2016 South Asian Games – Men =

Men's handball at the 2016 South Asian Games
- Venue: Indoor Hall, NERC LNIPE, Guwahati (India)
- Date: 10 February 2016–15 February 2016

Medalists
Gold medal	India
Silver medal	Pakistan
Bronze medal	Bangladesh

Men's handball at the 2016 South Asian Games was held in Guwahati, India from 10 to 16 February 2016.

== Preliminary round ==
All times are India Standard Time (UTC+05:30)

=== Group A ===
Team	Pld	W	D	L	GF	GA	GD	Pts
Pakistan	2	2	0	0	92	38	54	4
Nepal	2	1	0	1	44	76	32	2
Afghanistan	2	0	0	2	49	71	22	0

10 February 2016	Pakistan	42-23	Afghanistan
10 February 2016		(21-12)

11 February 2016	Afghanistan	26-29	Nepal
11 February 2016		(13-12)

12 February 2016	Pakistan	50-15	Nepal
12 February 2016		(24-05)

=== Group B ===
Team	Pld	W	D	L	GF	GA	GD	Pts
India	2	2	0	0	88	33	55	4
Bangladesh	2	1	0	1	59	66	-7	2
Sri Lanka	2	0	0	2	42	90	-48	0

10 February 2016	India	48-16	Sri Lanka
10 February 2016		(18-08)

11 February 2016	Bangladesh	42-26	Sri Lanka
11 February 2016		(23-11)

12 February 2016	India	40-17	Bangladesh
12 February 2016		(22-10)

== Final round ==
Semifinals
14 February
Pakistan	34
Bangladesh	19
14 February
India	51
Nepal	23

Gold medal match
15 February
Pakistan	31
India	32
Bronze medal match
15 February
Bangladesh	37
Nepal	25

=== Semifinals ===
14 February 2016	Pakistan	34 - 19	Bangladesh
14 February 2016		(20 - 10)

14 February 2016	India	51 - 23	Nepal
14 February 2016		(28-15)

=== Bronze medal match ===
15 February 2016	Bangladesh	37 - 25	Nepal
15 February 2016		(16-15)

=== Gold medal match ===
15 February 2016	India	32 - 31	Pakistan
15 February 2016		(15-11)

== Final standing ==
Rank	Team
1st place, gold medalist(s)	India
2nd place, silver medalist(s)	Pakistan
3rd place, bronze medalist(s)	Bangladesh
4	Nepal
5	Afghanistan
6	Sri Lanka
