= Handball at the 2016 South Asian Games =

Tournament held in india

- Venue: 1
- Dates: 10 February 2016–15 February 2016
- Nations: 7

The Handball event at the 2016 South Asian Games was held at the Indoor Hall of North-East Regional Centre of LNIPE, Guwahati (India) from 10 to 15 February 2016. Six teams participated in the men's competition and seven teams in the women's competition.

== Referees ==
7 referee pairs were selected by South Asian Handball Federation while 1 pair was nominated by Asian Handball Federation.

Referees
Jordan	Akram Al-Zayyat; Yaser Eial Awwad
Pakistan	Sultan Mehmood; Asif Ali
Bangladesh	Mohammed Ashfaq; Sain Gupta
India	
India	Nagraj; Suresh
India	
India	Govind Ram; Feroz Khan
India	Narender Maan; Sunil Kumar

== Medalists ==
Event	Gold	Silver	Bronze
Men	India	Pakistan	Bangladesh
Women	India	Bangladesh	Pakistan

== Medal table ==
Rank	Nation	Gold	Silver	Bronze	Total
1	India (IND)	2	0	0	2
2	Bangladesh (BAN)	0	1	1	2
2	Pakistan (PAK)	0	1	1	2
Totals (3 entries)		2	2	2	6

== Draw ==
=== Men ===
Group A

- Pakistan (Defending Champion)
- Nepal
- Afghanistan

Group B

- India (Host)
- Maldives
- Bangladesh

=== Women ===
Group A

- India (Host)
- Nepal
- Sri Lanka

Group B

- Bangladesh
- Maldives
- Pakistan
- Afghanistan

== Final standing ==
=== Men ===
Rank	Team
1st place, gold medalist(s)	India (1st Title) (Host)
2nd place, silver medalist(s)	Pakistan (Defending Champion)
3rd place, bronze medalist(s)	Bangladesh
4	Nepal
5	Afghanistan
6	Sri Lanka

=== Women ===
Rank	Team
1st place, gold medalist(s)	India (1st Title) (Host)
2nd place, silver medalist(s)	Bangladesh
3rd place, bronze medalist(s)	Pakistan
4	Nepal
5	Maldives
6	Sri Lanka
7	Afghanistan
