= Udaipur International Cricket Stadium =

Cricket stadium in Udaipur, Rajasthan, India

Udaipur International Cricket Stadium (Tentative)
- Interactive map of Udaipur International Cricket Stadium (Tentative)

Ground information
- Location: Udaipur, Rajasthan
- Country: India
- Coordinates: 24.54°N 73.767°E
- Establishment: TBA
- Capacity: 35,000
- End names
- N/A

Team information
Rajasthan cricket team	(TBA)
- As of 22 August, 2015

Udaipur International Cricket Stadium is a proposed cricket stadium in Udaipur, Rajasthan.

In 2013, after a dispute between the Rajasthan State Sports Council and the Rajasthan Cricket Association over the availability of Sawai Mansingh Stadium during the Indian Premier League, the RCA decided to construct their own stadium. RCA president CP Joshi decided that the RCA will have three cricket venues in Jaipur, Udaipur and Jodhpur for IPL matches. RCA has acquired land in Udaipur with 9.67 acres from the Udaipur Improvement Trust on a 99-year lease and stadium would have a capacity of 35,000 spectators.

== See also ==
- Maharana Bhupal Stadium
- Luv Kush Indoor Stadium
- Maharana Pratap Khel Gaon
