= Handball at the Islamic Solidarity Games =

- Frequency: Every four years
- Inaugurated: 2005 (Saudi Arabia) Mecca
- Most recent: 2025 (Saudi Arabia) Riyadh
- Most successful team(s): Men; Algeria; Bahrain; Qatar; Saudi Arabia (1 title); Women; Turkey (2 titles)

Handball at the Islamic Solidarity Games was introduced for men at the first edition in 2005 Islamic Solidarity Games held in Mecca. Women's handball competition was introduced at the fourth edition of 2017 Islamic Solidarity Games held in Baku.

== Men ==
=== Summary ===
Year	Host	Gold medal game			Bronze medal game
Year	Host	Gold Medalists	Score	Silver Medalists	Bronze Medalists	Score	4th place
2005; Details	(Saudi Arabia); Mecca	Algeria	25–23	Saudi Arabia	Egypt	32–28	Syria
2010	(Iran); Tehran (Note: The Games main host was Tehran, however handball was scheduled to be held in Isfahan.)	Cancelled			Cancelled
2013	(Indonesia); Palembang	Not held			Not held
2017; Details	(Azerbaijan); Baku	Saudi Arabia	26–21	Turkey	Iraq	27–22	Algeria
2021; Details	(Turkey); Konya	Qatar	26–23	Turkey	Iran	30–21	Saudi Arabia
2025; Details	(Saudi Arabia); Riyadh	Bahrain	33–31	Saudi Arabia	Qatar	36–28	United Arab Emirates

=== Medal table ===
Rank	Nation	Gold	Silver	Bronze	Total
1	Saudi Arabia	1	2	0	3
2	Qatar	1	0	1	2
3	Algeria	1	0	0	1
3	Bahrain	1	0	0	1
5	Turkey	0	2	0	2
6	Egypt	0	0	1	1
6	Iran	0	0	1	1
6	Iraq	0	0	1	1
Totals (8 entries)		4	4	4	12

=== Participating nations ===
Team	(Saudi Arabia) 2005	(Azerbaijan) 2017	(Turkey) 2021	(Saudi Arabia) 2025	Years
Algeria	1st	4th			2
Azerbaijan	GS	5th	5th		3
Bahrain	R2			1st	2
Egypt	3rd				1
Iran			3rd	GS	2
Iraq	GS	3rd		GS	3
Jordan	R2	8th			2
Kuwait				GS	1
Maldives				GS	1
Morocco	R2	6th	6th		3
Pakistan	GS	7th			2
Qatar			1st	3rd	2
Saudi Arabia	2nd	1st	4th	2nd	4
Senegal	GS				1
Sudan	GS				1
Syria	4th				1
Tunisia	R2				1
Turkey		2nd	2nd		2
United Arab Emirates				4th	1
Total	13	8	6	8	

- 1st–Champions
- 2nd–Runners-up
- 3rd–Third place
- 4th–Fourth place
- R2–Second group stage
- GS–Group stage
- — Hosts

== Women ==
=== Summary ===
Year	Host	Gold medal game			Bronze medal game
Year	Host	Gold Medalists	Score	Silver Medalists	Bronze Medalists	Score	4th place
2017; Details	(Azerbaijan); Baku	Azerbaijan	28–26	Turkey	Cameroon	35–27	Uzbekistan
2021; Details	(Turkey); Konya	Turkey	30–24	Azerbaijan	Cameroon	40–27	Uzbekistan
2025; Details	(Saudi Arabia); Riyadh	Turkey	34–31	Kazakhstan	Iran	29–25	Uzbekistan

=== Medal table ===
Rank	Nation	Gold	Silver	Bronze	Total
1	Turkey	2	1	0	3
2	Azerbaijan	1	1	0	2
3	Kazakhstan	0	1	0	1
4	Cameroon	0	0	2	2
5	Iran	0	0	1	1
Totals (5 entries)		3	3	3	9

=== Participating nations ===
Team	(Azerbaijan) 2017	(Turkey) 2021	(Saudi Arabia) 2025	Years
Afghanistan		8th		1
Azerbaijan	1st	2nd	GS	3
Bangladesh		7th		1
Cameroon	3rd	3rd		2
Guinea			GS	1
Iran		6th	3rd	2
Kazakhstan			2nd	1
Maldives			GS	1
Senegal		5th		1
Turkey	2nd	1st	1st	3
Uzbekistan	4th	4th	4th	3
Total	4	8	7	

- 1st–Champions
- 2nd–Runners-up
- 3rd–Third place
- 4th–Fourth place
- GS–Group stage
- — Hosts
