= Handball at the South Asian Games =

Handball has been a South Asian Games event since 2010 for men's and since 2016 for women's.

Pakistan is most successful team in men's handball event winning 2 gold and 1 silver medal, ahead of their arch rivals India. Pakistan won gold in the 2010 and 2019 edition of the South Asian Games beating India by 37–31 and 30–29 respectively. In the 2016 edition, Pakistan lost to the hosts India, score being 32–31.

In women's handball event, India is at top winning 2 gold medals.

== Results ==
=== Men ===
Handball event for men was added to the South Asian Games in its 11th edition held at Dhaka, Bangladesh.

Year	Host	Final			Third Place Match		
Year	Host	Champion	Score	Runner Up	Third Place	Score	Fourth Place
2010; Details	(Bangladesh); Dhaka	Pakistan	37–31	India	Bangladesh	42–11	Nepal
2016; Details	(India); Guwahati & Shillong	India	32–31	Pakistan	Bangladesh	37–25	Nepal
2019; Details	(Nepal); Kathmandu & Pokhara	Pakistan	30–29	India	Sri Lanka	26–23	Bangladesh

=== Women ===
Handball event for women was added to the South Asian Games in its 12th edition held at Guwahati, India.

Year	Host	Final			Third Place Match		
Year	Host	Champion	Score	Runner Up	Third Place	Score	Fourth Place
2016; Details	(India); Guwahati & Shillong	India	45–25	Bangladesh	Pakistan	28–24	Nepal
2019; Details	(Nepal); Kathmandu & Pokhara	India	35–21	Nepal	Bangladesh	31–15	Pakistan

== Medal table ==
=== Men ===
Rank	Nation	Gold	Silver	Bronze	Total
1	Pakistan	2	1	0	3
2	India	1	2	0	3
3	Bangladesh	0	0	2	2
4	Sri Lanka	0	0	1	1
Totals (4 entries)		3	3	3	9

=== Women ===
Rank	Nation	Gold	Silver	Bronze	Total
1	India	2	0	0	2
2	Bangladesh	0	1	1	2
3	Nepal	0	1	0	1
4	Pakistan	0	0	1	1
Totals (4 entries)		2	2	2	6
