= Handball at the 2019 South Asian Games – Men =

Men's handball at the 2019 South Asian Games
- Venue: Pokhara Covered Hall, Pokhara (Nepal)
- Date: December 4, 2010–December 9, 2019
- Nations: 6

Medalists
Gold medal	Pakistan
Silver medal	India
Bronze medal	Sri Lanka

The men's handball event at the 2019 South Asian Games was held in Pokhara, Nepal from 4 to 9 December 2019.

== Preliminary round ==
All times are Nepal Standard Time (UTC+05:45)

=== Group A ===
Team	Pld	W	D	L	GF	GA	GD	Pts
India	2	2	0	0	89	48	+41	4
Bangladesh	2	1	0	1	71	64	+7	2
Maldives	2	0	0	2	37	85	−48	0

4 December 2019; 16:00	India	42 – 33	Bangladesh	Pokhara Covered Hall, Pokhara
4 December 2019; 16:00		(22 – 19)		Pokhara Covered Hall, Pokhara

5 December 2019; 16:00	Bangladesh	38 – 22	Maldives	Pokhara Covered Hall, Pokhara
5 December 2019; 16:00		(16 – 10)		Pokhara Covered Hall, Pokhara

6 December 2019; 13:45	India	47 – 15	Maldives	Pokhara Covered Hall, Pokhara
6 December 2019; 13:45		(19 – 9)		Pokhara Covered Hall, Pokhara

=== Group B ===
Team	Pld	W	D	L	GF	GA	GD	Pts
Pakistan	2	2	0	0	85	39	+46	4
Sri Lanka	2	1	0	1	57	72	−15	2
Nepal	2	0	0	2	49	80	−31	0

4 December 2019; 13:45	Nepal	30 – 37	Sri Lanka	Pokhara Covered Hall, Pokhara
4 December 2019; 13:45		(16 – 17)		Pokhara Covered Hall, Pokhara

5 December 2019; 13:45	Nepal	19 – 43	Pakistan	Pokhara Covered Hall, Pokhara
5 December 2019; 13:45		(7 – 22)		Pokhara Covered Hall, Pokhara

6 December 2019; 16:00	Pakistan	42 – 20	Sri Lanka	Pokhara Covered Hall, Pokhara
6 December 2019; 16:00		(20 – 10)		Pokhara Covered Hall, Pokhara

== Final round ==
Semi-finals
7 December
India	39
Sri Lanka	32
7 December
Bangladesh	17
Pakistan	28

Final match
9 December
India	29
Pakistan	30
Bronze medal match
9 December
Sri Lanka	26
Bangladesh	23

=== Semi-finals ===
7 December 2019; 13:45	India	39 – 32	Sri Lanka	Pokhara Covered Hall, Pokhara
7 December 2019; 13:45		(18 – 11)		Pokhara Covered Hall, Pokhara

7 December 2019; 16:00	Bangladesh	17 – 28	Pakistan	Pokhara Covered Hall, Pokhara
7 December 2019; 16:00		(7 – 12)		Pokhara Covered Hall, Pokhara

=== Bronze medal match ===
9 December 2019	Sri Lanka	26 – 23	Bangladesh	Pokhara Covered Hall, Pokhara
9 December 2019		(12 – 11)		Pokhara Covered Hall, Pokhara

=== Final ===
9 December 2019	India	29 – 30	Pakistan	Pokhara Covered Hall, Pokhara; Referees: Khasan, Khusan (UZB)
9 December 2019		(16 – 13)		Pokhara Covered Hall, Pokhara; Referees: Khasan, Khusan (UZB)

== Final standings ==
Rank	Team
1st place, gold medalist(s)	Pakistan
2nd place, silver medalist(s)	India
3rd place, bronze medalist(s)	Sri Lanka
4	Bangladesh
5	Nepal
6	Maldives
