= Maharana Bhupal Stadium =

Multipurpose stadium in Udaipur, Rajasthan, India

Coordinates: 24.5782291°N 73.7123957°E

- Interactive map of Maharana Bhupal Stadium
- Full name: Maharana Bhupal Singh Stadium
- Former names: Maharana Bhupal Singh Stadium
- Location: Udaipur, Rajasthan
- Owner: Rajasthan State Sports Council
- Operator: Rajasthan State Sports Council
- Capacity: 10,000

Construction
- Groundbreaking: 1982
- Opened: 1982

Maharana Bhupal Stadium is a multipurpose stadium in Udaipur, Rajasthan. The ground is mainly used for organizing matches of football, cricket and other sports. The stadium has hosted two Ranji Trophy matches in 1982 when Rajasthan cricket team played against Uttar Pradesh cricket team and again in 1983 when Rajasthan cricket team played against Vidarbha cricket team.

== See also ==
- Maharana Pratap Khel Gaon
- Gandhi Ground
- Luv Kush Indoor Stadium
- Udaipur International Cricket Stadium
