= IHF Badge of Merit =

The IHF Badge of Merit is awarded by International Handball Federation to individuals who made an extraordinary contribution to the development of handball.

== Levels ==
The Badge of Merit is awarded at three levels: Bronze, Silver and Gold.

== IHF Gold Badge of Merit ==
The Badge of Merit in Gold is awarded to individuals who have made an outstanding contribution and/or given many years’ service to the sport of handball within the IHF. It therefore recognises, in particular, many years’ successful work within an IHF organ and/or a creative impetus for the development of handball.

The Badge of Merit consists of the Council’s insignia with half garland in gold. It is awarded by the IHF Council at the recommendation of the IHF Executive Committee, of the continental federations or of the member federations.

=== Recipients of IHF Gold Badge of Merit ===
| Year | Recipient | Country | Notes |
|---|---|---|---|
| 1974 | Paul Högberg | Sweden | IHF President (1971–1984) |
| 1974 | Aurelio Chiappero | Italy | Secretary General of Italian Handball Federation |
| 1976 | Henrique Feist | Portugal | Founder of Portuguese Handball Federation |
| 1976 | Dr. Mohamed Fadali | Egypt | IHF Council Member (1970–1976) and President of Egyptian Handball Federation |
| 2000 | Bob Elphinston | Australia |
| 2000 | Gilbert Felli | Belgium | Sports Director at International Olympic Committee |
| 2000 | Rudi Glock | Germany | IHF Treasurer (1988–2000) |
| 2000 | Pere Miro | Spain | Director of Olympic Solidarity in International Olympic Committee |
| 2000 | Dr. Nabil Salem | Egypt | President of African Handball Confederation (1973–1978; 1993–1996), IHF Vice-President |
| 2000 | Prince Sultan bin Abdulaziz Al Saud | Saudi Arabia | Crown Prince of Saudi Arabia |
| 2002 | Alberto de San Roman y de la Fuente | Spain | IHF Vice-President |
| 2002 | Otto Schwarz | Switzerland | IHF Council Member, Chairman of IHF COC |
| 2002 | Babacar Fall | Senegal | Posthumously Awarded; President of African Handball Confederation (1978–1993) |
| 2002 | Sheikh Fahad Al-Ahmed Al-Jaber Al-Sabah | Kuwait | Posthumously Awarded; President of African Handball Confederation (1974–1990), IHF Vice-President |
| 2002 | Dr. Peter Buehning Sr. | United States | President of Pan-American Team Handball Federation (1977–1980; 1987–1996), IHF Council Member (1987–1996) |
| 2009 | André Amiel | France | President of French Handball Federation (1996–2008) |
| 2009 | Cristian Gațu | Romania | President of Romanian Handball Federation |
| 2009 | Jesus Lopez Ricondo | Spain |
| 2009 | Luis Santos | Portugal |
| 2009 | Surinder Mohan Bali | India | Secretary General of Handball Federation of India |
| 2009 | Shaul Selzer | Israel | President of Israel Handball Association |
| 2009 | Aleksandar Dimitric | Australia | President of Oceania Handball Federation (1993–1997) and Australian Handball Federation |
| 2009 | Vladimir Maksimov | Russia | Former Handball at the 1976 Summer Olympics and Head Coach of Russia men's national handball team |
| 2009 | Muhammad Shafiq | Pakistan | President of Pakistan Handball Federation |
| 2009 | Mihajlo Mihajlovski | North Macedonia | President of Macedonian Handball Federation |

== IHF Silver Badge of Merit ==
The Badge of Merit in Silver is awarded to individuals who have worked with merit for many years within the sport of handball and/or have made a particular contribution to the organisation of IHF competitions.

The Badge of Merit consists of the Council’s insignia with half garland in silver. It is awarded by the Council at the recommendation of the continental federations, of the member federations, of the IHF Commissions or of the Head Office.

=== Recipients of IHF Silver Badge of Merit ===
| Year | Recipient | Country | Notes |
|---|---|---|---|
| 1996 | Robert Rosner | Austria |
| 1996 | Edmund Leser | Austria |
| 1998 | Aziz Derouaz | Algeria |
| 2000 | Erik Elias | Sweden | Chairman of IHF PRC (1984–1996) |
| 2000 | Prof. Dr. Hans-Georg Herrmann | Germany | IHF Council Member (1988–1996) |
| 2000 | Konstanrin Kotona | Albania |

== IHF Bronze Badge of Merit ==
The Badge of Merit in Bronze is awarded to individuals who made an extraordinary contribution to the development of handball within their national and/or continental federation.

The Badge of Merit consists of the Council’s insignia with a half garland in bronze. It is awarded by the continental federations at the request of their committee or the member federations. Every year, the IHF Council establishes a quota for such awards. The final date for the submission by the continental federations of their list of awards to the Head Office is 30 October of each year. This list is also sent to the Council for information.
