= 2004 Asian Men's Junior Handball Championship =

2004 handball championship in Asia

2004 Asian Junior Championship
Tournament details
- Host country: India
- Venue(s): 1 (in 1 host city)
- Dates: 8–17 September 2004
- Teams: 11

Final positions
- Champions: Kuwait (3rd title)
- Runners-up: South Korea
- Third place: Iran
- Fourth place: Japan

Tournament statistics
- Matches played: 32
- Goals scored: 1,771 (55.34 per match)

The 2004 Asian Men's Junior Handball Championship (9th tournament) took place in Hyderabad from 8 September–17 September. It acts as the Asian qualifying tournament for the 2005 Men's Junior World Handball Championship in Hungary.

== Draw ==
Group A	Group B
Qatar; South Korea; United Arab Emirates; China; Iran; ~~Uzbekistan~~ *	Japan; Kuwait; India; Chinese Taipei; Bangladesh; Oman

* Withdrew

== Preliminary round ==
=== Group A ===
Team	Pld	W	D	L	GF	GA	GD	Pts
South Korea	4	4	0	0	128	99	+29	8
Iran	4	3	0	1	108	88	+20	6
Qatar	4	2	0	2	113	98	+15	4
United Arab Emirates	4	1	0	3	106	121	−15	2
China	4	0	0	4	80	129	−49	0

8 September 2004; 18:00	United Arab Emirates	26–34	Qatar	Kotla Vijay Bhaskar Reddy Indoor Stadium, Hyderabad

8 September 2004; 19:30	Iran	30–16	China	Kotla Vijay Bhaskar Reddy Indoor Stadium, Hyderabad

9 September 2004; 16:30	China	22–33	South Korea	Kotla Vijay Bhaskar Reddy Indoor Stadium, Hyderabad
9 September 2004; 16:30		(8–21)		Kotla Vijay Bhaskar Reddy Indoor Stadium, Hyderabad

9 September 2004; 18:00	Iran	26–21	United Arab Emirates	Kotla Vijay Bhaskar Reddy Indoor Stadium, Hyderabad

10 September 2004; 15:00	South Korea	33–25	United Arab Emirates	Kotla Vijay Bhaskar Reddy Indoor Stadium, Hyderabad

10 September 2004; 18:00	Qatar	21–26	Iran	Kotla Vijay Bhaskar Reddy Indoor Stadium, Hyderabad

12 September 2004; 11:30	South Korea	30–26	Iran	Kotla Vijay Bhaskar Reddy Indoor Stadium, Hyderabad

12 September 2004; 18:00	Qatar	32–24	China	Kotla Vijay Bhaskar Reddy Indoor Stadium, Hyderabad

13 September 2004; 16:30	Qatar	26–32	South Korea	Kotla Vijay Bhaskar Reddy Indoor Stadium, Hyderabad
13 September 2004; 16:30		(10–20)		Kotla Vijay Bhaskar Reddy Indoor Stadium, Hyderabad

13 September 2004; 18:00	United Arab Emirates	34–28	China	Kotla Vijay Bhaskar Reddy Indoor Stadium, Hyderabad

=== Group B ===
Team	Pld	W	D	L	GF	GA	GD	Pts
Kuwait	5	5	0	0	163	103	+60	10
Japan	5	4	0	1	176	121	+55	8
Oman	5	2	1	2	163	135	+28	5
Chinese Taipei	5	2	0	3	167	160	+7	4
India	5	1	1	3	172	176	−4	3
Bangladesh	5	0	0	5	99	245	−146	0

8 September 2004; 10:00	Oman	32–29	Chinese Taipei	Kotla Vijay Bhaskar Reddy Indoor Stadium, Hyderabad
8 September 2004; 10:00		(16–16)		Kotla Vijay Bhaskar Reddy Indoor Stadium, Hyderabad

8 September 2004; 15:00	Japan	23–26	Kuwait	Kotla Vijay Bhaskar Reddy Indoor Stadium, Hyderabad
8 September 2004; 15:00		(14–15)		Kotla Vijay Bhaskar Reddy Indoor Stadium, Hyderabad

8 September 2004; 16:30	India	50–30	Bangladesh	Kotla Vijay Bhaskar Reddy Indoor Stadium, Hyderabad
8 September 2004; 16:30		(27–20)		Kotla Vijay Bhaskar Reddy Indoor Stadium, Hyderabad

9 September 2004; 10:00	Bangladesh	19–51	Kuwait	Kotla Vijay Bhaskar Reddy Indoor Stadium, Hyderabad

9 September 2004; 11:30	Oman	24–31	Japan	Kotla Vijay Bhaskar Reddy Indoor Stadium, Hyderabad
9 September 2004; 11:30		(7–14)		Kotla Vijay Bhaskar Reddy Indoor Stadium, Hyderabad

9 September 2004; 15:00	Chinese Taipei	45–38	India	Kotla Vijay Bhaskar Reddy Indoor Stadium, Hyderabad
9 September 2004; 15:00		(22–16)		Kotla Vijay Bhaskar Reddy Indoor Stadium, Hyderabad

10 September 2004; 10:00	Chinese Taipei	47–20	Bangladesh	Kotla Vijay Bhaskar Reddy Indoor Stadium, Hyderabad

10 September 2004; 11:30	India	28–42	Japan	Kotla Vijay Bhaskar Reddy Indoor Stadium, Hyderabad
10 September 2004; 11:30		(11–23)		Kotla Vijay Bhaskar Reddy Indoor Stadium, Hyderabad

10 September 2004; 16:30	Kuwait	27–20	Oman	Kotla Vijay Bhaskar Reddy Indoor Stadium, Hyderabad

12 September 2004; 15:00	India	32–32	Oman	Kotla Vijay Bhaskar Reddy Indoor Stadium, Hyderabad
12 September 2004; 15:00		(16–16)		Kotla Vijay Bhaskar Reddy Indoor Stadium, Hyderabad

12 September 2004; 16:30	Kuwait	32–17	Chinese Taipei	Kotla Vijay Bhaskar Reddy Indoor Stadium, Hyderabad

12 September 2004; 19:30	Japan	42–14	Bangladesh	Kotla Vijay Bhaskar Reddy Indoor Stadium, Hyderabad
12 September 2004; 19:30		(23–12)		Kotla Vijay Bhaskar Reddy Indoor Stadium, Hyderabad

13 September 2004; 11:30	Bangladesh	16–55	Oman	Kotla Vijay Bhaskar Reddy Indoor Stadium, Hyderabad

13 September 2004; 15:00	Japan	38–29	Chinese Taipei	Kotla Vijay Bhaskar Reddy Indoor Stadium, Hyderabad
13 September 2004; 15:00		(20–17)		Kotla Vijay Bhaskar Reddy Indoor Stadium, Hyderabad

13 September 2004; 19:30	Kuwait	27–24	India	Kotla Vijay Bhaskar Reddy Indoor Stadium, Hyderabad

== Placement 5th–10th ==
=== 9th/10th ===
16 September 2004; 15:00	China	36–27	India	Kotla Vijay Bhaskar Reddy Indoor Stadium, Hyderabad
16 September 2004; 15:00		(17–16)		Kotla Vijay Bhaskar Reddy Indoor Stadium, Hyderabad

=== 7th/8th ===
16 September 2004; 16:30	United Arab Emirates	41–39	Chinese Taipei	Kotla Vijay Bhaskar Reddy Indoor Stadium, Hyderabad
16 September 2004; 16:30		(20–19)		Kotla Vijay Bhaskar Reddy Indoor Stadium, Hyderabad

=== 5th/6th ===
16 September 2004; 18:00	Qatar	32–21	Oman	Kotla Vijay Bhaskar Reddy Indoor Stadium, Hyderabad
16 September 2004; 18:00		(13–11)		Kotla Vijay Bhaskar Reddy Indoor Stadium, Hyderabad

== Final round ==
Semifinals
15 September – Hyderabad
South Korea	34
Japan	29
15 September – Hyderabad
Kuwait	19
Iran	15

Gold medal match
17 September – Hyderabad
South Korea	24
Kuwait	26
Bronze medal match
17 September – Hyderabad
Japan	19
Iran	24

=== Semifinals ===
15 September 2004; 16:30	South Korea	34–29	Japan	Kotla Vijay Bhaskar Reddy Indoor Stadium, Hyderabad
15 September 2004; 16:30		(19–11)		Kotla Vijay Bhaskar Reddy Indoor Stadium, Hyderabad

15 September 2004; 18:00	Kuwait	19–15	Iran	Kotla Vijay Bhaskar Reddy Indoor Stadium, Hyderabad

=== Bronze medal match ===
17 September 2004; 16:30	Japan	19–24	Iran	Kotla Vijay Bhaskar Reddy Indoor Stadium, Hyderabad
17 September 2004; 16:30		(7–13)		Kotla Vijay Bhaskar Reddy Indoor Stadium, Hyderabad

=== Gold medal match ===
17 September 2004; 18:00	South Korea	24–26	Kuwait	Kotla Vijay Bhaskar Reddy Indoor Stadium, Hyderabad

== Final standing ==
Rank	Team
1st place, gold medalist(s)	Kuwait
2nd place, silver medalist(s)	South Korea
3rd place, bronze medalist(s)	Iran
4	Japan
5	Qatar
6	Oman
7	United Arab Emirates
8	Chinese Taipei
9	China
10	India
11	Bangladesh

Team qualified for the 2005 Junior World Championship
