= 2023 Premier Handball League (India) =

2023 PHL season
- League: Premier Handball League
- Sport: Handball
- Duration: 8 – 25 June
- Number of teams: 6
- TV partner(s): JioCinema, Sports18, FanCode
- Season champions: Maharashtra Ironmen
- Season MVP: (India) Sukhveer Sing Brar (Golden Eagles UP)
- Top scorer: (India) Sukhveer Sing Brar (102)
- Finals champions: Maharashtra Ironmen
- Runners-up: Golden Eagles UP
- Finals MVP: (Moldova) Igor Chiseliov (Maharashtra Ironmen)

The 2023 Premier Handball League was the first season of the PHL in India. All games were played at the Sawai Mansingh Indoor Stadium in Jaipur.

== Regular season ==
Pos	Team	Pld	W	D	L	GF	GA	GD	Pts	Qualification
1	Maharashtra Ironmen	10	7	1	2	0	0	0	15	Qualification for Semi finals
2	Telugu Talons	10	7	1	2	0	0	0	15	Qualification for Semi finals
3	Rajasthan Patriots	10	7	0	3	0	0	0	14	Qualification for Semi finals
4	Golden Eagles UP	10	3	1	6	0	0	0	7	Qualification for Semi finals
5	Delhi Panzers	10	3	0	7	0	0	0	6	
6	Garvit Gujarat	10	1	1	8	0	0	0	3	

Source: PHL

== Semi finals ==
24 June 2023; 19:00	Rajasthan Patriots	28–38	Maharashtra Ironmen	Sawai Mansingh Indoor Stadium, Jaipur
24 June 2023; 19:00	Singh 7	(14–17)	Chiseliov 10	Sawai Mansingh Indoor Stadium, Jaipur

24 June 2023
20:30
Goldean Eagles UP
44–43 (ET)
Telugu Talons
Sawai Mansingh Indoor Stadium, Jaipur
Shinde 15
(11–16)
Patel 15

FT: 35–35 ET: 5–5 Pen: 4–3

== Final ==
25 June 2023; 19:00	Maharashtra Ironmen	38–24	Goldean Eagles UP	Sawai Mansingh Indoor Stadium, Jaipur
25 June 2023; 19:00	Chiseliov & Kiani 11	(16–12)	Brar 10	Sawai Mansingh Indoor Stadium, Jaipur
