= Maha Handball Super League =

Sports league in India

- Sport: Handball
- Founded: 2016; 10 years ago
- Founder: Ravi Giakwad
- First season: 2015–16
- Owner: Handball Association of Maharashtra
- No. of teams: 6
- Country: India
- Venues: Sholapur, Maharashtra
- Confederation: Handball Association of Maharashtra
- Broadcaster: DD Sports
- Level on pyramid: 1

The Maha Handball Super League had been the premier men's professional handball league in Maharashtra, administered by the Handball Association of Maharashtra under the aegis of the Handball Federation of India. It was founded in 2015.

== Format ==
The league had 6 teams in its inaugural season. Each team played 5 matches with the game duration of 40 minutes (in 4 quarters).

== Teams ==
City	Franchise
Mumbai	Mumbai Falcons
Solapur	Smart Solapur Lions
Amravati	Amravati Armours
Nagpur	Nagpur Vidarbha Tigers
Aurangabad	Aurangabad Astras
Nashik	Nashik Lancer

== Winners by season ==
Season	Winner	Runner-up	Third
2015–16	Smart Sholapur Lions	Mumbai Falcons	Nashik Lancers

== See also ==
- Premier Handball League
