= Telugu Talons =

Indian men's handball team

Telugu Talons are a professional Indian men's handball team that first competed in the Premier Handball League. Telugu Talons have been the only team from South India. They finished the 2023 edition as semi-finalists. The team is currently owned by the Kankanala Sports Group.

== History ==
In the inaugural season of the Premier Handball League, Telugu Talons got off winning their first two games against Garvit Gujarat and Golden Eagles UP. This was followed by two consecutive defeats against Maharashtra Ironmen and Delhi Panzers, before they went on a 4-game win streak. The Talons wrapped up their league stage campaign with a victory over Garvit Gujarat.

In the semi-final they faced defeat in a tightly contested encounter, going down 4–3 in a penalty shootout against the Golden Eagles UP. Rahul TK was awarded the Golden glove for his league-high 184 saves. Telugu Talons announced a sponsorship agreement with A23, an online multi-gaming platform ahead of the 2023 season. Jawaharlal Nehru Technological University was announced as the training partner for the season and hosted the official jersey launch of the Talons. Shubham Sheoran was the captain of the team for the first season.

== Team records ==
Player	Shots	Goals	Efficiency	Penalties	Penalties scored	Steals	Assists
Naseeb Singh	113	78	69%	35	26	4	7
Kailash Patel	87	68	78%	16	16	3	7
Davinder Bhullar	102	58	57%	1	0	7	37
Anil Khudia	83	38	46%	1	1	4	66
Mohit Kumar	52	28	54%	0	0	3	16
Rahul Nain	29	22	76%	0	0	4	2
Raghu Kumara	26	15	58%	0	0	2	7
Vishal Hadia	32	15	47%	0	0	4	18
Shubham Sheoran	25	11	44%	2	1	1	9
Ajay Moyal	9	6	67%	0	0	0	8
Chirag Chandel	13	6	46%	2	1	1	1
Mohit Yadav	6	3	50%	0	0	0	0
Iaroslav Shabanov	7	2	29%	0	0	1	2
Rey Joshua Tabuzo	2	1	50%	0	0	0	0
Goalkeepers
Name	Saves	Efficiency	Penalty saves	Penalty efficiency	Assists	-	
Rahul T K	184	40%	4	13%	5	-	
Andrei Nedbailo	10	23%	6	27%	0	-	
Sombir	0	0%	0	0%	0	-	

Title	Total	League rank
Goals	351	3rd
Saves	195	3rd
Penalty goals	45	1st
Shot efficiency	60%	1st
Penalty shot efficiency	79%	3rd
Penalty saves	10	4th

== Roster (2023) ==
No.	Name		Position
1	Andrei Nedbailo	(Russia)	Goalkeeper
2	Iaroslav Shabanov	(Russia)	Left back
3	Rey Joshua Tabuzo	(Philippines)	Right back
4	Naseeb Singh	(India)	Right wing
5	Anil Khudia	(India)	Centre back
6	Shubham Sheoran	(India)	Left back
7	Kailash Patel	(India)	Left wing
8	Rahul T K	(India)	Goalkeeper
9	Raghu Kumara	(India)	Pivot
10	Mohit Kumar	(India)	Right back
11	Chirag Chandel	(India)	Right wing
12	Vishal Hadia	(India)	Right back
13	Mohit Yadav	(India)	Left wing
14	Davinder Bhullar	(India)	Left back
15	Ajay Moyal	(India)	Centre back
16	Sombir	(India)	Goalkeeper
17	Rahul Nain	(India)	Pivot

== Administration and staff (2023) ==
Position	Name
Owner	Kankanala Sports Group
Head coach	(Portugal) Fernando Nunes
Assistant coach	(India) Sachin Kumar Bhardwaj
