= 2017 Asian Men's Club League Handball Championship =

- Logo of 20th AHF Asian Men's Club League Handball Championship

Tournament details
- Host country: India
- Venue(s): 1 (in 1 host city)
- Dates: 20 – 30 November 2017
- Teams: 9 (from 1 confederation)

Final positions
- Champions: (Bahrain) Al-Najma (1st title)
- Runner-up: (Qatar) Al-Duhail Club
- Third place: (Qatar) Al-Ahli Club
- Fourth place: (United Arab Emirates) Sharjah Club

Tournament statistics
- Matches played: 24
- Goals scored: 1,452 (60.5 per match)

‌The 2017 Asian Club League Handball Championship was the 20th edition of the championship held under the aegis of Asian Handball Federation. The championship was hosted by Handball Federation of India at the Kotla Vijay Bhaskar Reddy Indoor Stadium, Hyderabad (India) from 20 to 30 November 2017. It was the official competition for men's handball clubs of Asia crowning the Asian champions. Al-Najma wins the championship by beating Al-Duhail Club (Qatar) by 21 – 16 in a low scoring match. The winner qualifies for the 2018 IHF Super Globe.

== Draw ==
The draw ceremony took place on 7 October 2017 at the Hotel Marigold, Begumpet, Hyderabad (India) at 14:00 (UTC+05:30).

The ceremony was attended by the Asian Handball Federation's Executive Director Dr. Ahmed Abu Al-Lail, AHF Technical Manager Mr. Jasem M. Al-Theyab, Secretary General of Handball Federation of India Mr. Anandeshwar Pandey and the representatives of the participating clubs. The draw results are as follows:

Group A	Group B
~~(Saudi Arabia) Al-Noor Club~~ (Qatar) Al-Duhail Club (United Arab Emirates) Sharjah Club (Iran) Naft-o-Gaz Club (Oman) Muscat Club	Club India (Qatar) Al-Ahli Club (Uzbekistan) RKOR Club (Bahrain) Al-Najma (Iraq) Al-Shurta Club

- Al-Noor Club of Saudi Arabia withdrew from the championship a few days before the start, stating that their main key players were injured during preparation for the championship.

== Group A ==
Team	Pld	W	D	L	GF	GA	GD	Pts
(Qatar) Al-Duhail Club	3	2	1	0	95	82	+13	5
(United Arab Emirates) Sharjah Club	3	1	2	0	96	91	+5	4
(Oman) Muscat Club	3	1	1	1	78	83	−5	3
(Iran) Naft-o-Gaz Club	3	0	0	3	86	99	−13	0
~~(Saudi Arabia) Al-Noor Club~~	0	0	0	0	0	0	0	0

20 November 2017; 13:00	Naft-o-Gaz Club (Iran)	29 – 36	(Qatar) Al-Duhail Club	Kotla Vijay Bhaskar Reddy Indoor Stadium, Hyderabad
20 November 2017; 13:00		(11 – 16)		Kotla Vijay Bhaskar Reddy Indoor Stadium, Hyderabad

21 November 2017; 13:00	Sharjah Club (United Arab Emirates)	29 – 29	(Qatar) Al-Duhail Club	Kotla Vijay Bhaskar Reddy Indoor Stadium, Hyderabad
21 November 2017; 13:00		(14 – 14)		Kotla Vijay Bhaskar Reddy Indoor Stadium, Hyderabad

23 November 2017; 13:00	Al-Duhail Club (Qatar)	30 – 24	(Oman) Muscat Club	Kotla Vijay Bhaskar Reddy Indoor Stadium, Hyderabad
23 November 2017; 13:00		(14 – 10)		Kotla Vijay Bhaskar Reddy Indoor Stadium, Hyderabad

23 November 2017; 17:00	Naft-o-Gaz Club (Iran)	33 – 38	(United Arab Emirates) Sharjah Club	Kotla Vijay Bhaskar Reddy Indoor Stadium, Hyderabad
23 November 2017; 17:00		(17 – 18)		Kotla Vijay Bhaskar Reddy Indoor Stadium, Hyderabad

24 November 2017; 13:00	Muscat Club (Oman)	25 – 24	(Iran) Naft-o-Gaz Club	Kotla Vijay Bhaskar Reddy Indoor Stadium, Hyderabad
24 November 2017; 13:00		(11 – 10)		Kotla Vijay Bhaskar Reddy Indoor Stadium, Hyderabad

26 November 2017; 13:00	Muscat Club (Oman)	29 – 29	(United Arab Emirates) Sharjah Club	Kotla Vijay Bhaskar Reddy Indoor Stadium, Hyderabad
26 November 2017; 13:00		(14 – 15)		Kotla Vijay Bhaskar Reddy Indoor Stadium, Hyderabad

== Group B ==
Team	Pld	W	D	L	GF	GA	GD	Pts
(Bahrain) Al-Najma	4	4	0	0	130	94	+36	8
(Qatar) Al-Ahli Club	4	2	1	1	149	110	+39	5
(Iraq) Al-Shurta Club	4	2	1	1	142	111	+31	5
(Uzbekistan) RKOR Club	4	0	1	3	115	158	−43	1
Club India	4	0	1	3	120	183	−63	1

20 November 2017; 15:00	Al-Najma (Bahrain)	29 – 25	(Qatar) Al-Ahli Club	Kotla Vijay Bhaskar Reddy Indoor Stadium, Hyderabad
20 November 2017; 15:00		(13 – 10)		Kotla Vijay Bhaskar Reddy Indoor Stadium, Hyderabad

20 November 2017; 19:00	Al-Shurta Club (Iraq)	51 – 37	Club India	Kotla Vijay Bhaskar Reddy Indoor Stadium, Hyderabad
20 November 2017; 19:00		(30 – 14)		Kotla Vijay Bhaskar Reddy Indoor Stadium, Hyderabad

21 November 2017; 15:00	RKOR Club (Uzbekistan)	30 – 39	(Qatar) Al-Ahli Club	Kotla Vijay Bhaskar Reddy Indoor Stadium, Hyderabad
21 November 2017; 15:00		(14 – 18)		Kotla Vijay Bhaskar Reddy Indoor Stadium, Hyderabad

21 November 2017; 19:00	Al-Najma (Bahrain)	38 – 23	Club India	Kotla Vijay Bhaskar Reddy Indoor Stadium, Hyderabad
21 November 2017; 19:00		(18 – 16)		Kotla Vijay Bhaskar Reddy Indoor Stadium, Hyderabad

23 November 2017; 15:00	Al-Ahli Club (Qatar)	26 – 26	(Iraq) Al-Shurta Club	Kotla Vijay Bhaskar Reddy Indoor Stadium, Hyderabad
23 November 2017; 15:00		(11 – 13)		Kotla Vijay Bhaskar Reddy Indoor Stadium, Hyderabad

23 November 2017; 19:00	Al-Najma (Bahrain)	40 – 25	(Uzbekistan) RKOR Club	Kotla Vijay Bhaskar Reddy Indoor Stadium, Hyderabad
23 November 2017; 19:00		(22 – 10)		Kotla Vijay Bhaskar Reddy Indoor Stadium, Hyderabad

24 November 2017; 15:00	Al-Shurta Club (Iraq)	21 – 23	(Bahrain) Al-Najma	Kotla Vijay Bhaskar Reddy Indoor Stadium, Hyderabad
24 November 2017; 15:00		(9 – 13)		Kotla Vijay Bhaskar Reddy Indoor Stadium, Hyderabad

24 November 2017; 19:00	RKOR Club (Uzbekistan)	35 – 35	Club India	Kotla Vijay Bhaskar Reddy Indoor Stadium, Hyderabad
24 November 2017; 19:00		(17 – 16)		Kotla Vijay Bhaskar Reddy Indoor Stadium, Hyderabad

26 November 2017; 15:00	Al-Shurta Club (Iraq)	44 – 25	(Uzbekistan) RKOR Club	Kotla Vijay Bhaskar Reddy Indoor Stadium, Hyderabad
26 November 2017; 15:00		(26 – 14)		Kotla Vijay Bhaskar Reddy Indoor Stadium, Hyderabad

26 November 2017; 19:00	Club India	25 – 59	(Qatar) Al-Ahli Club	Kotla Vijay Bhaskar Reddy Indoor Stadium, Hyderabad
26 November 2017; 19:00		(15 – 32)		Kotla Vijay Bhaskar Reddy Indoor Stadium, Hyderabad

== 5th–8th Placement Matches ==
27 November 2017; 16:00	Muscat Club (Oman)	38 – 20	(Uzbekistan) RKOR Club	Kotla Vijay Bhaskar Reddy Indoor Stadium, Hyderabad
27 November 2017; 16:00		(16 – 09)		Kotla Vijay Bhaskar Reddy Indoor Stadium, Hyderabad

27 November 2017; 18:00	Al-Shurta Club (Iraq)	31 – 20	(Iran) Naft-o-Gaz Club	Kotla Vijay Bhaskar Reddy Indoor Stadium, Hyderabad
27 November 2017; 18:00		(14 – 07)		Kotla Vijay Bhaskar Reddy Indoor Stadium, Hyderabad

=== 7th–8th-place match ===
30 November 2017; 13:00	RKOR Club (Uzbekistan)	30 – 34	(Iran) Naft-o-Gaz Club	Kotla Vijay Bhaskar Reddy Indoor Stadium, Hyderabad
30 November 2017; 13:00		(17 – 18)		Kotla Vijay Bhaskar Reddy Indoor Stadium, Hyderabad

=== 5th–6th-place match ===
30 November 2017; 15:00	Muscat Club (Oman)	24 – 36	(Iraq) Al-Shurta Club	Kotla Vijay Bhaskar Reddy Indoor Stadium, Hyderabad
30 November 2017; 15:00		(12 – 18)		Kotla Vijay Bhaskar Reddy Indoor Stadium, Hyderabad

== Semifinal matches ==
28 November 2017; 16:00	Al-Duhail Club (Qatar)	31 – 26	(Qatar) Al-Ahli Club	Kotla Vijay Bhaskar Reddy Indoor Stadium, Hyderabad
28 November 2017; 16:00		(13 – 09)		Kotla Vijay Bhaskar Reddy Indoor Stadium, Hyderabad

28 November 2017; 18:00	Al-Najma (Bahrain)	29 – 27	(United Arab Emirates) Sharjah Club	Kotla Vijay Bhaskar Reddy Indoor Stadium, Hyderabad
28 November 2017; 18:00		(17 – 15)		Kotla Vijay Bhaskar Reddy Indoor Stadium, Hyderabad

=== Bronze-medal match ===
30 November 2017; 17:00	Al-Ahli Club (Qatar)	31 – 27	(United Arab Emirates) Sharjah Club	Kotla Vijay Bhaskar Reddy Indoor Stadium, Hyderabad
30 November 2017; 17:00		(13 – 15)		Kotla Vijay Bhaskar Reddy Indoor Stadium, Hyderabad

=== Gold-medal match ===
30 November 2017; 19:00	Al-Duhail Club (Qatar)	16 – 21	(Bahrain) Al-Najma	Kotla Vijay Bhaskar Reddy Indoor Stadium, Hyderabad
30 November 2017; 19:00		(9 – 9)		Kotla Vijay Bhaskar Reddy Indoor Stadium, Hyderabad

== Final standings ==
Rank	Team
1st place, gold medalist(s)	(Bahrain) Al-Najma (1st title)
2nd place, silver medalist(s)	(Qatar) Al-Duhail Club
3rd place, bronze medalist(s)	(Qatar) Al-Ahli Club
4	(United Arab Emirates) Sharjah Club
5	(Iraq) Al-Shurta Club
6	(Oman) Muscat Club
7	(Iran) Naft-o-Gaz Club
8	(Uzbekistan) RKOR Club
9	Club India (Host)

Team qualified for the 2018 IHF Super Globe
