= Premier Handball League (India) =

Handball tournament in India

- Sport: Handball
- Founded: 2020; 6 years ago
- Founder: Handball Association of India (HAI); Bluesport Entertainment Pvt Ltd
- First season: 2023
- Motto: It's a Different Ball Game
- No. of teams: 6
- Country: India
- Confederation: Asian Handball Federation
- Most recent champion: Maharashtra Ironmen (2023)
- Most titles: Maharashtra Ironmen (1 title)
- Broadcasters: Sports18; JioCinema; FanCode; PHL (YouTube)
- Level on pyramid: 1
- International cup: AHF Handball Championship
- Tournament format: Round-robin, knockout
- Website: Official website
- 2023 PHL

The Premier Handball League (PHL) was India's men's professional handball league. The league was an initiative between the Handball Association of India (HAI) and the Bluesport Entertainment Private Limited. Premier Handball League used a franchise-based model. It was sanctioned by the South Asian Handball Federation and affiliated with the Asian Handball Federation. It was replaced by the Handball Pro League.

== History ==
The Premier Handball League encompasses six franchises, each representing cities across India. The teams were officially announced at a press conference in Jaipur. The first season was held between 8 and 25 June 2023 at Sawai Mansingh Indoor Stadium. The first player auction was held on 23 April.

== Teams ==
Locations of the Premier Handball League clubs

City	Team	Debut	Owner(s)
Hyderabad	Telugu Talons	2023	Abhishek Reddy Kankanala
Jaipur	Rajasthan Patriots	2023	Shiv Vilas Resorts Private Limited
Lucknow	Golden Eagles Uttar Pradesh	2023	Iconic Olympic Games Academy
Ahmedabad	Garvit Gujarat	2023	R. K. Naidu
Mumbai	Maharashtra Ironmen	2023	Punit Balan
Delhi	Delhi Panzers	2023	Vineet Bhandari, Rajat Agarwal, Sailesh Arya

== Winners ==
Year	Winner	Runner-up	Score	Venue (city)
2023	Maharashtra Ironmen	Golden Eagles Uttar Pradesh	38–24	Sawai Mansingh Indoor Stadium (Jaipur)

== See also ==
- Maha Handball Super League
