= Maharana Pratap Khel Gaon =

Sports stadium in Rajasthan, India

- Khel Gaon Udaipur
- Interactive map of Maharana Pratap Khel Gaon
- Location: Udaipur, Rajasthan
- Coordinates: 24.6159027°N 73.7325317°E
- Capacity: 15,000

Maharana Pratap Khel Gaon is a sports stadium in Udaipur, Rajasthan, India. It is committed to 12 sports, including Basketball, Volleyball, Tennis, Kho-Kho, Kabaddi, Handball, Archery, Rifle shooting, Judo – Karate, Boxing, Swimming, Squash.

== Overview ==
Situated near Chitrakoot Nagar, Maharana Pratap Khel Gaon is developed with a joint venture by Urban Improvement Trust (UIT), Udaipur and Municipal Council of Udaipur. Shri Vikram Singh from Rajasthan State Sports Council is designated as the sports officer for this project. During its development, Maharana Pratap Khel Gaon faced some controversies regarding the quality of construction and availability of basic amenities. But with some additional efforts by UIT, and additional investments of Rs. 14 Crore, its development was set to right track. By 2020, Maharana Pratap Khel Gaon is expected to have a fully operational International Cricket Stadium.

== See also ==
- Maharana Bhupal Stadium
- Gandhi Ground
- Luv Kush Indoor Stadium
- Udaipur International Cricket Stadium
