= Cristian Gațu =

Romanian handball player (born 1945)

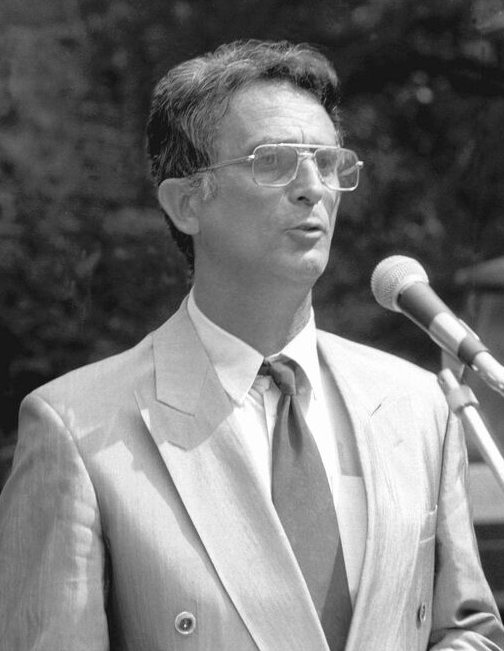
- Gațu in 1992

Personal information
- Born: 20 August 1945 (age 81) Bucharest, Romania
- Height: 178 cm (5 ft 10 in)
- Weight: 75 kg (165 lb)

Sport
- Sport: Handball
- Club: Rapid București (1963–64); Știința București (1964–68); Steaua Bucharest (1968–78); Polisportiva Follonica (1981–83)
Medal record
Representing Romania
Olympic Games
Silver medal – second place	1976 Montreal	Team
Bronze medal – third place	1972 Munich	Team
World Championship
Gold medal – first place	1970 France	Team
Gold medal – first place	1974 East Germany	Team
Bronze medal – third place	1967 Sweden	Team

Cristian Gațu (born 20 August 1945) is a retired Romanian handball player. He earned 212 caps with the national team, winning the world title in 1970 and 1974 and medalling at the 1972 and 1976 Olympics. After retiring from competitions he became a coach and sports official, appointed as Secretary of State for Youth and Sports in 1991–1993 and President of the Romanian Handball Federation in 1997–2014.

== Biography ==
Gațu, an ethnic Aromanian, was born to renowned sports journalist Petre Gațu. In his early years he studied civil engineering in Bucharest and competed nationally in chess, association football and handball, eventually choosing handball for his career. With Steaua București, he won ten national titles and the 1977 European Cup. He retired after spending two seasons in Italy with Tuscany Follonica in the 1980s, both as a player and a coach. In 1983, he returned to Romania, where he first worked as an instructor of water sports, but later moved from coaching to administration. Between 1984 and 1991 he was vice president of Steaua București, and in 1991–1993 served as Secretary of State for Youth and Sports. In 1993–1997, he headed a military physical education faculty, in 1997–1998 was appointed as president of Steaua București, and in 1996–2002 served as vice president of the Romanian Olympic Committee. In parallel he headed the Romanian Handball Federation between 1997 and 2014. On 14 September 2007, he was promoted to the military rank of brigadier general.

== Honours ==
- World Champion 1970 and 1974 with Romania.
- EHF Champions League 1977 with Steaua Bucharest.
- IHF Gold Badge of Merit: 2009
