= Handball Association of Hong Kong, China =

Governing body of handball in Hong Kong

Handball Association of Hong Kong, China Chinese: 中國香港手球總會 HAHKC
- IOC nation: Hong Kong, China (HKG)
- Sport: Handball
- Other sports: Beach Handball
- Official website: www.handball.org.hk

HISTORY
- Year of formation: December 1970; 54 years ago

AFFILIATIONS
- International federation: International Handball Federation (IHF)
- IHF member since: 1974
- Continental association: Asian Handball Federation
- National Olympic Committee: Sports Federation and Olympic Committee of Hong Kong, China
- Other affiliation(s): Commonwealth Handball Association

GOVERNING BODY
- President: Wilfred Ng

HEADQUARTERS
- Address: Room 2007, Olympic House
- Country: Hong Kong
- Secretary General: Lee Ka Leung

The Handball Association of Hong Kong, China (Chinese: 中國香港手球總會) (HAHKC) is the administrative and controlling body for handball and beach handball in Hong Kong, China. HAHKC is a member of the Asian Handball Federation (AHF) and member of the International Handball Federation (IHF) since 1974.

== National teams ==
- Hong Kong men's national handball team
- Hong Kong men's national junior handball team
- Hong Kong women's national handball team
- Hong Kong national beach handball team
- Hong Kong women's national beach handball team

== Competitions hosted ==
- 2017 Asian Women's Junior Handball Championship
- 2013 Asian Beach Handball Championship
