= Handball at the 2016 South Asian Games – Women =

Women's handball at the 2016 South Asian Games
- Venue: Indoor Hall, NERC LNIPE, Guwahati (India)
- Date: 10 February 2016–15 February 2016
- Nations: 7

Medalists
Gold medal	India
Silver medal	Bangladesh
Bronze medal	Pakistan

The women's handball competition at the 2016 South Asian Games was held in Guwahati, India from 10 to 16 February 2016.

== Results ==
All times are India Standard Time (UTC+05:30)

=== Group stages ===
==== Group A ====
Team	Pld	W	D	L	GF	GA	GD	Pts
India	2	2	0	0	117	30	87	4
Nepal	2	1	0	1	56	71	-15	2
Sri Lanka	2	0	0	2	34	106	-72	0

10 February 2016	India	47 - 20	Nepal
10 February 2016		(20 - 8)

11 February 2016	Nepal	36 - 24	Sri Lanka
11 February 2016		(12 - 8)

12 February 2016	India	70 - 10	Sri Lanka
12 February 2016		(35 - 5)

==== Group B ====
Team	Pld	W	D	L	GF	GA	GD	Pts
Bangladesh	3	3	0	0	134	56	78	6
Pakistan	3	1	1	1	110	61	49	3
Maldives	3	1	1	1	92	64	28	3
Afghanistan	3	0	0	3	24	179	-155	0

10 February 2016	Bangladesh	62 - 5	Afghanistan
10 February 2016		(30-2)

10 February 2016	Pakistan	17 - 17	Maldives
10 February 2016		(6-7)

11 February 2016	Bangladesh	38 - 24	Pakistan
11 February 2016		(19 - 14)

12 February 2016	Maldives	48 - 13	Afghanistan
12 February 2016		(20 - 7)

13 February 2016	Bangladesh	34 - 27	Maldives
13 February 2016		(22 - 11)

13 February 2016	Pakistan	69 - 6	Afghanistan
13 February 2016		(37 - 3)

=== Final round ===
Semifinals
14 February
India	43
Pakistan	23
14 February
Bangladesh	33
Nepal	28

Gold medal match
15 February
India	45
Bangladesh	25
Bronze medal match
15 February
Pakistan	28
Nepal	24

==== Semifinals ====
14 February 2016	India	43 - 23	Pakistan
14 February 2016		(26 - 11)

14 February 2016	Bangladesh	33 - 28	Nepal
14 February 2016		(13 - 11)

==== Bronze medal match ====
15 February 2016	Pakistan	28 - 24	Nepal
15 February 2016		(17 - 11)

==== Gold medal match ====
15 February 2016	India	45 - 25	Bangladesh
15 February 2016		(24-13)

== Final standing ==
Rank	Team
1st place, gold medalist(s)	India (1st Title) (Host)
2nd place, silver medalist(s)	Bangladesh
3rd place, bronze medalist(s)	Pakistan
4	Nepal
5	Maldives
6	Sri Lanka
7	Afghanistan
