= Muhammad Rashid Khan =

Pakistani javelin thrower (born 1952)

Personal information
- Nationality: Pakistani
- Born: 26 October 1952 (age 73)

Sport
- Sport: Track and field
- Event: Javelin throw
Medal record
Men's athletics
Representing Pakistan
South Asian Games
Gold medal – first place	1987 Kolkata	Javelin throw

Muhammad Rashid Khan (born 26 October 1952) is a Pakistani athlete. He competed in the men's javelin throw at the 1984 Summer Olympics.

At the 1987 South Asian Games, Khan won the javelin gold with a Games record throw of 71.92 metres, which still stands as of 2024 for the old javelin model.

Training under the leadership of Muhammad Shafiq, Khan once set a Pakistani record in the javelin with a 76.36 m throw.

== See also ==
- List of Pakistani records in athletics
- Athletics in Pakistan
- Pakistan at the Olympics
