= Himachal Pradesh Handball Association =

Handball governing body in Himachal Pradesh

Himachal Pradesh Handball Association (HPHA) is an organisation which manages the sport of handball in the Indian state of Himachal Pradesh. It is an affiliated member of the Handball Association of India.

One of its aims is to ensure fair representation in sports. As of 2025, the President of HPHA is Bharat Sahni and the Secretary General is Nand Kishore Sharma.
