= H. L. Kapur =

Indian politician (1923–2020)

Air Vice Marshal Harkrishan Lal Kapur PVSM, AVSM
- हरकिशन लाल कपूर

10th Lieutenant Governor of Delhi
- In office 16 November 1985 – 3 August 1988
- President: Zail Singh; Ramaswamy Venkataraman
- Preceded by: Mohan M.K. Wali, IAS
- Succeeded by: Romesh Bhandari, IFS

Member of Parliament, Rajya Sabha
- In office 3 January 1985 – 14 November 1985
- Nominated by: Zail Singh
- Appointed by: Ramaswamy Venkataraman
- Constituency: Nominated

2nd President of Handball Federation of India
- In office 1976–1985
- Secretary General: M. L. Khan
- Preceded by: Laxmi Chhabla
- Succeeded by: Dr. Roshan Lal Anand

23rd & 24th President of Services Sports Control Board
- In office March 1976 – June 1979
- Secretary: Lieutenant Colonel Darshan Singh; Wing Commander Sak Durrani
- Preceded by: Major General Srinivas Kumar Sinha
- Succeeded by: Air Vice-Marshal Prem Pal Singh

Personal details
- Born: 10 December 1923 Rohtak, Punjab, British India (now in Haryana, India)
- Died: 14 February 2020 (aged 96) Dehradun, Uttarakhand, India
- Party: Indian National Congress
- Parent: Dr. Ram Chand Kapur (father)
- Education: Forman Christian College, Lahore
- Occupation: Military Service
- Profession: Politician, Sports administrator
- Awards: Padma Shri (1983); Param Vishisht Seva Medal (1979); Ati Vishisht Seva Medal (1974)
- Religion: Hinduism

Military service
- Allegiance: British India (1943–1947); India (1947 – 1979)
- Branch/service: Royal Indian Air Force (1943–1947); Indian Air Force (1947–1979)
- Years of service: 11 Jan 1943 – 30 Jun 1979
- Rank: Air Vice Marshal
- Service number: 2165 ADM

Harkrishan Lal Kapur (10 December 1923 – 14 February 2020) was a former Air Vice Marshal of Indian Air Force and a member of the Indian National Congress who served as 11th Lieutenant Governor of Delhi from 16 November 1985 to 3 August 1988.

== Early life and education ==
Kapur was born to civil surgeon Rai Bahadur Dr. Ram Chand Kapur on 10 December 1923 at Rohtak. He graduated from Forman Christian College, Lahore in 1942.

== Military service ==
He was commissioned in Royal Indian Air Force on 11 January 1943. He retired as Air Vice Marshal after 37 years of service on 30 June 1979.

== Politics ==
Kapur joined Indian National Congress after retirement from Indian Air Force. He was nominated for Rajya Sabha in 1985. He took oath on 3 January 1985 but resigned on 14 November 1985 to become Lieutenant Governor of Delhi.

== Sports administration ==
Kapur was also active in sports administration along with his service in Air Force. He served as President of Services Sports Control Board from March 1976 to June 1979. He also served as President of Handball Federation of India from 1976 to 1985.

== Awards ==
Kapur was awarded the Padma Shri, the fourth highest civilian award by Government of India in 1983.

Decoration	Country	Year
Padma Shri	India	1983
Param Vishisht Seva Medal	India	1979
Ati Vishisht Seva Medal	India	1974

== Death ==
Kapur died at the age of 96 years on 14 February 2020 after prolonged illness at Dehradun where he was residing with his daughter at her house on Rajpura Road. His cremation took place in the same evening with full honour at Lakhibagh Ghat.
