= Afghanistan Handball Federation =

Governing body of handball in Afghanistan

Afghanistan Handball Federation Pashto: فدراسیون هندبال افغانستان AHF
- IOC nation: Afghanistan (AFG)
- Sport: Handball
- Other sports: Beach handball; Wheelchair handball

HISTORY
- Year of formation: 2004; 21 years ago

AFFILIATIONS
- International federation: International Handball Federation (IHF)
- IHF member since: 2004
- Continental association: Asian Handball Federation
- National Olympic Committee: Afghanistan National Olympic Committee
- Other affiliation(s): South Asian Handball Federation

GOVERNING BODY
- President: Hedayatullah Muhmand

HEADQUARTERS
- Address: P.O. Box 1824, Kabul
- Country: Afghanistan
- Secretary General: Mrs. Onab Barzz Qadiri

The Afghanistan Handball Federation (AHF) (Pashto: فدراسیون هندبال افغانستان) is the administrative and controlling body for handball and beach handball in Afghanistan. Founded in 2004, AHF is a member of Asian Handball Federation (AHF) and the International Handball Federation (IHF).

== National teams ==
- Afghanistan men's national handball team
- Afghanistan women's national handball team
- Afghanistan national beach handball team
- Afghanistan women's national beach handball team
