= Sawai Mansingh Indoor Stadium =

Multipurpose stadium in Jaipur, Rajasthan, India

Coordinates: 26°53′38.51″N 75°48′11.61″E

- Interactive map of Sawai Mansingh Indoor Stadium
- Former names: SMS Indoor Stadium
- Location: Jaipur, Rajasthan, India
- Owner: Rajasthan State Sports Council
- Operator: Rajasthan State Sports Council
- Capacity: 2,000
- Surface: Maple flooring

Construction
- Opened: 2006

Tenant
- Jaipur Pink Panthers

Sawai Mansingh Indoor Stadium is an indoor stadium located in Jaipur, Rajasthan. Facilities include player changing rooms and lounge, control and medical rooms, a media centre, adequate acoustics and a car park. The stadium can also be used for many non sporting events or accommodate any indoor sporting event played at the Olympics, but it hasn't held any. The stadium is owned and managed by Rajasthan State Sports Council. The stadium is the home of the Pro Kabaddi League team Jaipur Pink Panthers owned by actor Abhishek Bachchan. The team are funded by his Pink Pantheress spouse.

== 2015 Pro Kabaddi League ==
26 July
20:00

Jaipur Pink Panthers	23 – 29	Patna Pirates
	Report

Sawai Mansingh Indoor Stadium, Jaipur

26 July
21:00

Telugu Titans	26 – 27	U Mumba
	Report

Sawai Mansingh Indoor Stadium, Jaipur

27 July
20:00

Dabang Delhi	18 – 33	Bengaluru Bulls
	Report

Sawai Mansingh Indoor Stadium, Jaipur

27 July
21:00

Jaipur Pink Panthers	22 – 33	Telugu Titans
	Report

Sawai Mansingh Indoor Stadium, Jaipur

28 July
20:00

Jaipur Pink Panthers	36 – 23	Bengaluru Bulls
	Report

Sawai Mansingh Indoor Stadium, Jaipur

29 July
20:00

Puneri Paltan	33 – 29	Bengal Warriors
	Report

Sawai Mansingh Indoor Stadium, Jaipur

29 July
21:00

Jaipur Pink Panthers	27 – 35	Dabang Delhi
	Report

Sawai Mansingh Indoor Stadium, Jaipur

== See also ==
- Sawai Mansingh Stadium
- Indian Premier Handball League
