= Nepal Handball Association =

National governing body for Handball in Nepal

- Sport: Handball
- Also governs: Beach handball, Wheelchair handball
- Jurisdiction: (Nepal) National
- Abbreviation: NHA
- Founded: 1980; 46 years ago
- Affiliation: International Handball Federation
- Affiliation date: 1984
- Regional affiliation: Asian Handball Federation
- Sub-regional affiliation: South Asian Handball Federation
- Headquarters: National Sports Council, Tripureshwor, Kathmandu
- President: Tej Bahadur Gurung
- Secretary: Sandesh Kumar Regmi

Official website
- nepalhandball.org.np
- (Nepal)

The Nepal Handball Association is the national governing body for handball in Nepal and is a voting member of the Nepal Olympic Committee. It is accredited by the International Handball Federation and Asian Handball Federation.

== Affiliated associations ==
- Gandaki Province Handball Association
  - Kaski District Handball Association

== National teams ==
- Nepal men's national handball team
- Nepal women's national handball team
