= Cook Islands Handball Association =

Governing body of handball in the Cook Islands

Cook Islands Handball Association CIHA
- IOC nation: Cook Islands (COK)
- Sport: Handball
- Other sports: Beach handball; Wheelchair handball

HISTORY
- Year of formation: 1999; 26 years ago

AFFILIATIONS
- International federation: International Handball Federation (IHF)
- IHF member since: 1999
- Continental association: Oceania Continent Handball Federation
- National Olympic Committee: Cook Islands Sports and National Olympic Committee
- Other affiliation(s): Commonwealth Handball Association

GOVERNING BODY
- Patron: Sir Geoffrey Henry, KBE
- President: Makiroa Mitchell-John

HEADQUARTERS
- Address: Rarotonga
- Country: Cook Islands
- Secretary General: Melina Tuiravakai

The Cook Islands Handball Association (CIHA) is the governing body for the sport of handball and beach handball in the Cook Islands. CIHA is member of the Oceania Continent Handball Federation (OCHF), International Handball Federation (IHF) and the Commonwealth Handball Association (CHA).

== National teams ==
- Cook Islands men's national handball team
- Cook Islands men's national junior handball team
- Cook Islands men's national youth handball team

== See also ==
- Oceania Handball Nations Cup
- Oceania Handball Challenge Trophy
