= Azerbaijan men's national handball team =

Azerbaijan

Information
- Association: Azerbaijan Handball Federation

Colours
1st	2nd
- Last updated on Unknown.

The Azerbaijan national handball team is the national handball team of Azerbaijan, representing the country in international matches. It is controlled by the Azerbaijan Handball Federation. The team was founded in 1992 after the dissolution of the Soviet Union.

== Events ==
=== World Championship ===
World Championship record
Year	Round	Position	GP	W	D	L	GS	GA
(Nazi Germany) 1938	Did Not Qualify							
(Sweden) 1954	Did Not Qualify							
(East Germany) 1958	Did Not Qualify							
(West Germany) 1961	Did Not Qualify							
(Czechoslovakia) 1964	Did Not Qualify							
(Sweden) 1967	Did Not Qualify							
(France) 1970	Did Not Qualify							
(East Germany) 1974	Did Not Qualify							
(Denmark) 1978	Did Not Qualify							
(West Germany) 1982	Did Not Qualify							
(Switzerland) 1986	Did Not Qualify							
(Czechoslovakia) 1990	Did Not Qualify							
(Sweden) 1993	Did Not Qualify							
(Iceland) 1995	Did Not Qualify							
(Japan) 1997	Did Not Qualify							
(Egypt) 1999	Did Not Qualify							
(France) 2001	Did Not Qualify							
(Portugal) 2003	Did Not Qualify							
(Tunisia) 2005	Did Not Qualify							
(Germany) 2007	Did Not Qualify							
(Croatia) 2009	Did Not Qualify							
(Sweden) 2011	Did Not Qualify							
(Spain) 2013	Did Not Qualify							
(Qatar) 2015	Did Not Qualify							
(France) 2017	Did Not Qualify							
(Denmark) / (Germany) 2019	Did Not Qualify							
(Egypt) 2021	Did Not Qualify							
(Poland) / (Sweden) 2023	Did Not Qualify							
(Croatia) / (Denmark) / (Norway) 2025	Did Not Qualify							
(Germany) 2027	to be determined							
(France) / (Germany) 2029	to be determined							
(Denmark) / (Iceland) / (Norway) 2031	to be determined							
Total	0/29	–	0	0	0	0	0	0

=== European Championship ===
European Championship record										Qualification							
Year	Round	Rank	M	W	D	L	GF	GA	GD	M	W	D	L	GF	GA	GD	Link
(Portugal) 1994	Did Not Qualify									0	0	0	0	0	0	0	Link
(Spain) 1996	Did Not Qualify									0	0	0	0	0	0	0	Link
(Italy) 1998	Did Not Qualify									0	0	0	0	0	0	0	Link
(Croatia) 2000	Did Not Qualify									0	0	0	0	0	0	0	Link
(Sweden) 2002	Did Not Qualify									0	0	0	0	0	0	0	Link
(Slovenia) 2004	Did Not Qualify									0	0	0	0	0	0	0	Link
(Switzerland) 2006	Did Not Qualify									0	0	0	0	0	0	0	Link
(Norway) 2008	Did Not Qualify									0	0	0	0	0	0	0	Link
(Austria) 2010	Did Not Qualify									0	0	0	0	0	0	0	Link
(Serbia) 2012	Did Not Qualify									0	0	0	0	0	0	0	Link
(Denmark) 2014	Did Not Qualify									0	0	0	0	0	0	0	Link
(Poland) 2016	Did Not Qualify									0	0	0	0	0	0	0	Link
(Croatia) 2018	Did Not Qualify									0	0	0	0	0	0	0	Link
(Austria) (Norway) (Sweden) 2020	Did Not Qualify									0	0	0	0	0	0	0	Link
(Hungary) / (Slovakia) 2022	Did Not Qualify									0	0	0	0	0	0	0	Link
(Germany) 2024	Did Not Qualify									0	0	0	0	0	0	0	Link
(Denmark) / (Norway) / (Sweden) 2026	Did Not Qualify									0	0	0	0	0	0	0	Link
(Portugal) / (Spain) / (Switzerland) 2028	To be determined									To be determined							
Total	0/17	–	0	0	0	0	0	0	0	0	0	0	0	0	0	0	-

=== IHF Emerging Nations Championship ===
- 2015: Did Not Compete
- 2017 – 10th place
- 2019 – 10th place
- 2023 – 12th place
- 2025 – 8th place

=== Handball at the Islamic Solidarity Games ===
- Handball at the 2005 Islamic Solidarity Games – 11th place
- Handball at the 2017 Islamic Solidarity Games – 5th place
- Handball at the 2021 Islamic Solidarity Games – 6th place
