= Punit Balan =

Indian filmmaker and social worker

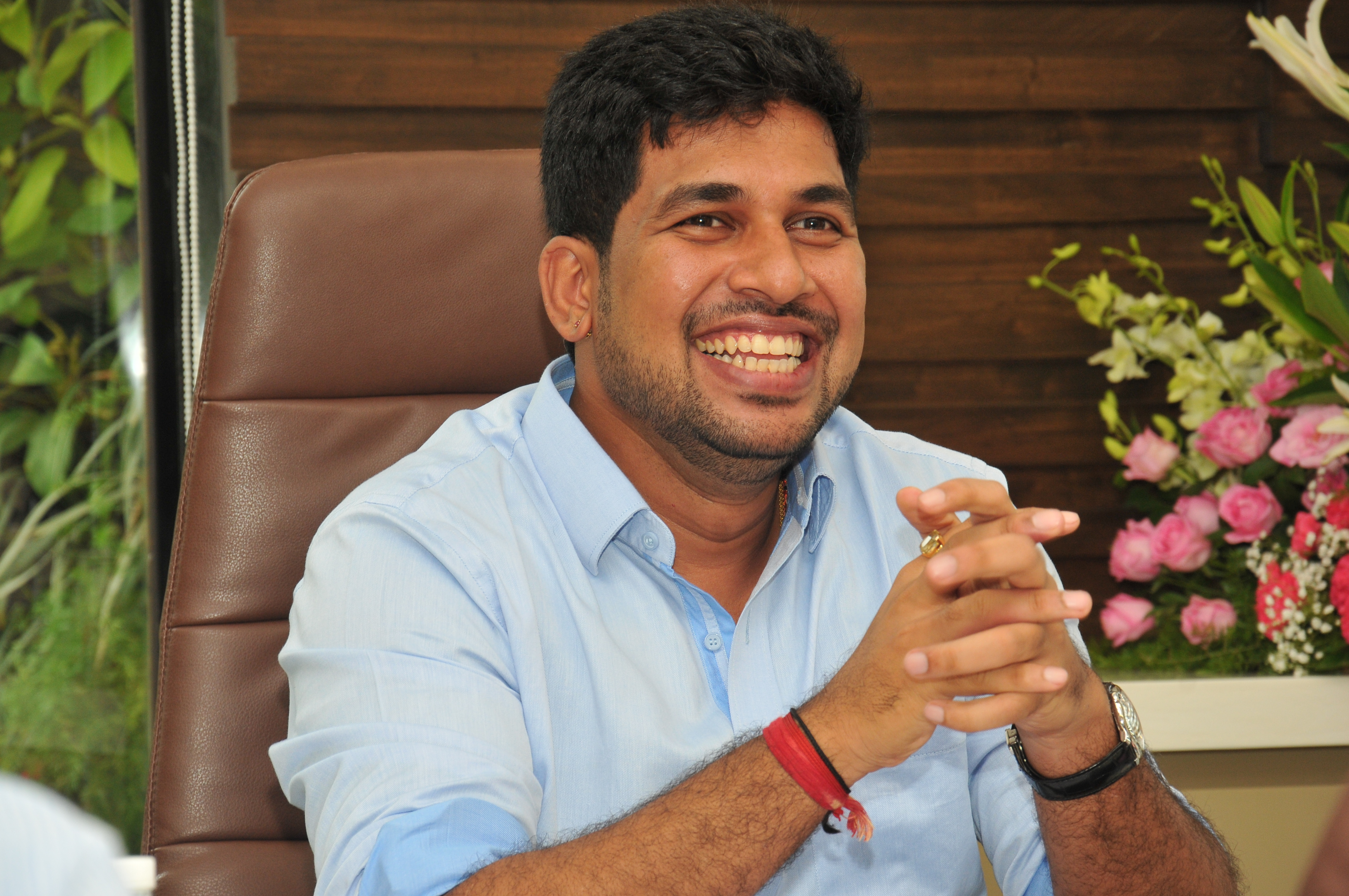
- Born: Pune, India
- Spouse: Janhavi R. Dhariwal (m. 2022)

Punit Balan is an Indian film producer and owner of several sporting teams. He owns Pune Jaguars (tennis), Mumbai Khiladis (kho kho) and Maharashtra Ironmen (handball), Kolhapur Tuskers (Cricket), Bengaluru Smashers (Table Tennis), Mumbai Muscle (Pro Panja). Balan has also provided sponsorship money to several players.

== Film ==
| Year | Title | Writer | Producer | Awards | Ref |
|---|---|---|---|---|---|
| 2018 | Mulshi Pattern | No | Yes | Zee Chitra Gaurav Puraskar for Best Film | |
| 2020 | Bappache Gharich Visarjan Surakshit Visarjan | Yes | Yes | | |
| 2020 | Shrimant Bhausaheb Rangari online cultural festival | No | Yes | | |
| 2020 | Punaragamanaya Cha | Yes | Yes | | |
| 2020 | Aashechi Roshnai | No | Yes | | |
| 2021 | Good Shot | No | Yes | | |
| 2021 | Aman ka Ashiyana | No | Yes | | |
| 2022 | Bhadrakali | No | Yes | | |
| 2023 | The Hindu Boy | No | Yes | | |
| 2023 | Jaggu Ani Juliet | No | Yes | 61st Maharashtra State Film Awards | |
| 2023 | Raanti | No | Yes | | |
| 2024 | 75 Years Of NDA | No | Yes | 72nd National Award (Best Editor) | |
| 2027 | Mulshi Pattern 2 | No | Yes | | |
