= Handball Association of Maharashtra =

Handball governing body in Maharashtra

Handball Association of Maharashtra (HAM, हैंडबाल एसोसिएशन ऑफ महाराष्ट्र) is the governing body for handball in Maharashtra. The organisation is an affiliated member of the Handball Association of India (HAI). HAM started the first ever handball league in India, known as the Maha Handball Super League.

== HAM tournaments ==
=== State ===
- Maharashtra Senior Men's State Handball Championship
- Maharashtra Senior Women's State Handball Championship
- Maharashtra Junior Boy's State Handball Championship
- Maharashtra Junior Girl's State Handball Championship
- Maharashtra Sub-Junior Boy's State Handball Championship
- Maharashtra Sub-Junior Girl's State Handball Championship

=== Club ===
- Maha Handball Super League
