= 2023 Pro Panja League =

The 2023 Pro Panja League (PPL) was the inaugural season of the tournament. The Kochi KD's won the season by defeating Kiraak Hyderabad 30–28 in the final. 32 million people watched the season on TV.

== Playoffs ==
=== Final ===
Kochi KD's vs Kiraak Hyderabad on 13 August: Final score was 30–28.

In the undercard bouts, Kochi KD's and Kiraak Hyderabad both earned 2 points.

In the main card bouts, the breakdown of points in each bout between the two teams was 5–0, 0–10, 10–0, 0–10, 0–5, and 10–0, resulting in a tie at 27-27.

In the tiebreaker, each team won one of the first two bouts, with Kochi KD's then winning the next two bouts to take a 2-point lead and thus win the title.
