= Roshan Lal Anand =

Indian sports administrator (1924–2024)

2nd Secretary General of Asian Handball Federation
- In office 26 November 2000 – 25 October 2013
- President: Sheikh Ahmed Al-Fahad Al-Ahmed Al-Sabah (Kuwait)
- Preceded by: Syed Abul Hassan (Pakistan)
- Succeeded by: Muhammad Shafiq (Pakistan)

9th Secretary General of Indian Olympic Association
- In office 1986–1987
- President: Vidya Charan Shukla
- Preceded by: Air Vice-Marshal C. L. Mehta
- Succeeded by: Raja Randhir Singh

3rd President of Handball Federation of India
- In office 1985–2010
- Secretary General: Surinder Mohan Bali
- Preceded by: Air Vice-Marshal H. L. Kapur
- Succeeded by: Dr. Sarwan Singh Channy, IAS

7th Director of the National Institute of Sports
- In office 3 July 1970 – 30 November 1986
- Preceded by: S. D. Chopra
- Succeeded by: S. K. Chaturvedi

Personal details
- Born: 19 January 1924 Amritsar, Punjab Province, British India (present-day Punjab, India)
- Died: 17 December 2024 (aged 100) New Delhi, India
- Profession: Sports administrator
- Awards: Padma Shri (1976)
- Religion: Hinduism

Roshan Lal Anand (19 January 1924 – 17 December 2024) was an Indian sports administrator who served as 2nd Secretary General of Asian Handball Federation from 2000 to 2013.

== Early life ==
Roshan Lal Anand was born on 19 January 1924 in Punjab Province, British India.

Anand is the longest-serving Director of Netaji Subhas National Institute of Sports (NIS) to date. He was appointed NIS Director on 4 July 1970 and served in this position for 16 years until his superannuation on 30 November 1986.

== Sports administration ==
=== Asian Handball Federation ===
On 26 November 2000, Dr. Anand was elected as Secretary General of Asian Handball Federation, when he succeeded Pakistani sports administrator Syed Abul Hassan. He served in this position for 13 years until 25 October 2013, when he was succeeded by Muhammad Shafiq.

=== Indian Olympic Association ===
Anand was elected as Secretary General of Indian Olympic Association from 1986 – 1987. He was also elected as Vice-President of the Indian Olympic Association after 1987.

=== Handball Federation of India ===
Anand was one of the founder members of Handball Federation of India (HFI) and was elected as HFI President in 1985 and served in the position till 2010 when he selflessly did not file nomination for the position due to his age. He is the longest serving HFI President to date. He was appointed Life-President of Handball Federation of India (HFI) for his lifetime services to HFI and for development of handball upon completion of his term as president in 2010 and held this position till his last breath.

=== Others ===
Anand also served as President of Commonwealth Handball Association and as member of Arbitration Commission of the International Handball Federation.

== Personal life and death ==
Anand turned 100 on 19 January 2024, and died at his residence in New Delhi on 17 December.

== Awards ==
Anand was awarded the Padma Shri, the fourth highest civilian award by Government of India in 1976.

Decoration	Country	Year	Note
Padma Shri	India	1976	Fourth highest civilian award in the Republic of India
