= Pakistan Handball Federation =

Pakistani sports governing body

Pakistan Handball Federation Urdu: پاکستان ہینڈبال فیڈریشن PHF
- IOC nation: PAK
- Sport: Handball
- Other sports: Beach Handball; Wheelchair handball
- Official website: www.pakhandball.org

HISTORY
- Year of formation: April 1985; 39 years ago at Faisalabad (Punjab)
- Former names: Pakistan Amateur Handball Federation

AFFILIATIONS
- International federation: International Handball Federation (IHF)
- IHF member since: 1985
- Continental association: Asian Handball Federation
- National Olympic Committee: Pakistan Olympic Association
- Member of NOC since: 1985
- Other affiliation(s): Pakistan Sports Board; Commonwealth Handball Association; South Asian Handball Federation

GOVERNING BODY
- Patron: Syed Muhammad Abid Qadri (Patron-in-Chief); Haji Muhammad Akram Ansari (Patron)
- President: Muhammad Shafiq (Pakistan)

HEADQUARTERS
- Address: 14-E Tech Town, Satiana Road, Faisalabad
- Country: Pakistan
- Secretary General: Javed Iqbal Gill

Pakistan Handball Federation (Urdu: پاکستان ہینڈبال فیڈریشن) (PHF) is the administrative and controlling body for handball and beach handball in Islamic Republic of Pakistan. PHF is an affiliated member of the Asian Handball Federation (AHF) and the International Handball Federation (IHF).

== History ==
In Pakistan, the sport of handball was introduced by Muhammad Shafiq in 1984 at University of Agriculture, Faisalabad, which has been a hub of handball in Pakistan since then. During the 20th National Games of Pakistan, which was staged in Faisalabad, an exhibition match between National Athletics & Fitness Club and University of Agriculture, Faisalabad, was played at Iqbal Stadium, Faisalabad. Since then, handball has been gradually developing and gaining popularity. PHF was formed in April 1985 with Ahsan Alam as president and Muhammad Shafiq as secretary general.

== Presidents ==
S. No.	Name	Tenure
1.	Ahsan Alam	April 1985 – December 2004
2.	Syed Muhammad Abid Qadri	December 2004 – December 2012
3.	Muhammad Shafiq	December 2012 – present

== Secretaries general ==
S. No.	Name	Tenure
1.	Muhammad Shafiq	April 1985 – December 2004
2.	Muhammad Fahim *	December 2004 – 9 January 2006
Acting	Ch. Muhammad Saleem Akhter	9 January 2006 – 24 February 2007
3.	Muhammad Shafiq	24 February 2007 – December 2012
4.	Khalid Rashid	December 2012 – December 2016
5.	Javed Iqbal Gill	December 2016 – present

- Muhammad Fahim died in office on 9 January 2006.

== Executive committee ==
Designation	Name
President	Muhammad Shafiq
Vice-President	Amna Tanvir
Vice-President	Athar Ismail Amjad
Vice-President	Lt. Col. Ahmad Ali Khan
Vice-President	Muhammad Aamir
Vice-President	Bahr-e-Karam
Secretary General	Javed Iqbal Gill
Associate Secretaries	Saqlain Kausar
Associate Secretaries	Sohaib Shafiq
Associate Secretaries	Sohail Ahmad Khan
Treasurer	Mohammad Hanif

== See also ==
- Pakistan men's national handball team
- Pakistan national beach handball team
