= Pro Panja League =

Indian arm wrestling competition

- Current season, competition or edition: 2025 Pro Panja League
- Sport: Arm wrestling
- Founded: 2020
- First season: 2023
- Motto: Aapki Kismat, Aapke Haath (Your Fate, Your Hands) Bharat Ka Khel (India's Game)
- No. of teams: 6
- Country: India
- Most recent champion: Kiraak Hyderabad
- Most titles: Rohtak Rowdies; Kochi KD's (1 Title each)
- Broadcasters: (Main Card) Sony Sports Network DD Sports
- Streaming partners: India: Fancode; Worldwide: SportVot
- Website: https://propanja.com/

The Pro Panja League (PPL) is a professional Indian arm wrestling league which had its first season in July 2023. There are separate competition categories for men, women, and specially abled (disabled) players, and the tournament took place at Indira Gandhi Indoor Stadium in New Delhi.

== History ==
The name of the tournament is based on "Panja", a word used in the Indian subcontinent to refer to arm wrestling. Starting in 2020, there were some exhibition events, tournaments, and matches held, which acquired about 275 million views on social media. Before the first season, there was a ranking tournament held at Gwalior, Madhya Pradesh, with the top 18 arm wrestlers in each of the 10 weight categories qualifying for the first season. The first season was won by the Kochi KDs.

== Rules ==
=== League format ===
Each team plays each other twice during the round-robin stage, and the top four teams enter the playoffs, which consist of two semi-finals (1st vs 4th, 2nd vs 3rd) and a final.

=== Gameplay ===
Two players in the same weight category compete to overpower each other and score points over several rounds of a bout. In an "under card/prelim" bout, three rounds are contested, while in a "main card" bout, five rounds are contested. Three under card and three main card bouts take place within a single match, each featuring a different pair of opponents; the team whose players scored more points wins the match. In an under card bout, the player who wins two out of three rounds earns one point, while the loser gains nothing; in a main card bout, players earns one point for every round they win. In the final, five main card bouts are contested.

At the start of each round, the players offer one of their hands while keeping elbows on a specially designed table, with a strap being bound around offered hands to avoid slippage. The players attempt to force their opponent's hand to hit designated touch pads on the table underneath their hands to win the round. There are various rule violations which can result in penalties against players. Two bonus points are gained in main card bout if a player wins without opponent scoring a point (i.e. a 3-0 victory earns 5 points). Bout must be completed within 30 minutes. An additional challenge round can be called in main card bout. The player calling for the challenge round can win five bonus points if they beat opponent within 10 seconds; however, if it fails, the opponent earns five bonus points.

== Teams ==
=== Current teams ===
Locations of the PPL teams

Team	City	Debut	Notes
Mumbai Muscle	Mumbai, Maharashtra	2023	
Kiraak Hyderabad	Hyderabad, Telangana	2023	
Jaipur Veers	Jaipur, Rajasthan	2025	
Sher-E-Ludhiana	Ludhiana, Punjab	2025	
MP Hathodas	Madhya Pradesh	2025	
Rohtak Rowdies	Rohtak, Haryana	2023	

=== Former teams ===
Team	Debut	Dissolved	Notes
Kochi KD's	2023	2024	Season 1 champion
Ludhiana Lions	2023	2024	
Rarh Bengal Tigers		2025	Dissolved before competing
Baroda Badshahs	2023	2024	

Six teams compete in the league. 180 players in ten different weight categories were drafted for the first season, with six weight categories reserved for men, three for women, and one for physically challenged participants. The winning team will win ₹2 million (US$21,000), while the runner-up team will win ₹500,000 (US$5,200), with equal money distributed in all categories.

== Editions and results ==
Year	Final			Venue	Total teams
Year	Champion	Result	Runners-up	Venue	Total teams
2023	Kochi KD's	30–28	Kiraak Hyderabad	Indira Gandhi Indoor Stadium, New Delhi	6
2025	Kiraak Hyderabad	30-18	Rohtak Rowdies	Jiwaji Club, Gwalior	6

== Broadcasters ==
Pro Panja League telecasts on Sony Sports Network and DD Sports in India. It also broadcasts on FanCode and SportVot.

== See also ==
- Sport in India
