= Maharashtra Ironmen =

Indian handball team

- Full name: Maharashtra Ironmen
- Sport: Handball
- Founded: 2023
- First season: 2023
- League: Premier Handball League
- Based in: Pune
- Colors
- Owner: Punit Balan, Janhavi Dhariwal Balan
- Head coach: Sunil Gahlawat, Ajay Kumar Dabas
- Championships: 1

Maharashtra Ironmen is a professional men's handball team based in Pune, Maharashtra, India, that last played in the Premier Handball League. Maharashtra Ironmen won inaugural season by defeating Golden Eagles Uttar Pradesh by 38–24. The team is owned by Punit Balan and Janhavi Dhariwal Balan.
