= Handball at the 2019 South Asian Games – Women =

Women's handball at the 2019 South Asian Games
- Venue: Pokhara Covered Hall, Pokhara (Nepal)
- Date: December 4, 2019–December 9, 2019
- Nations: 6

Medalists
Gold medal	India
Silver medal	Nepal
Bronze medal	Bangladesh

The women's handball tournament at the 2019 South Asian Games was held in Pokhara, Nepal from 4 to 9 December 2019.

== Preliminary round ==
All times are Nepal Standard Time (UTC+05:45)

=== Group A ===
Team	Pld	W	D	L	GF	GA	GD	Pts
India	2	2	0	0	86	33	+53	4
Pakistan	2	1	0	1	56	72	−16	2
Maldives	2	0	0	2	36	73	−37	0

4 December 2019; 11:45	India	41 – 9	Maldives	Pokhara Covered Hall, Pokhara
4 December 2019; 11:45		(22 – 0)		Pokhara Covered Hall, Pokhara

5 December 2019; 11:45	Maldives	27 – 32	Pakistan	Pokhara Covered Hall, Pokhara
5 December 2019; 11:45		(12 – 16)		Pokhara Covered Hall, Pokhara

6 December 2019; 09:00	Pakistan	24 – 45	India	Pokhara Covered Hall, Pokhara
6 December 2019; 09:00		(6 – 27)		Pokhara Covered Hall, Pokhara

=== Group B ===
Team	Pld	W	D	L	GF	GA	GD	Pts
Nepal	2	2	0	0	55	43	+12	4
Bangladesh	2	1	0	1	58	39	+19	2
Sri Lanka	2	0	0	2	32	63	−31	0

4 December 2019; 09:00	Nepal	29 – 19	Sri Lanka	Pokhara Covered Hall, Pokhara
4 December 2019; 09:00		(17 – 13)		Pokhara Covered Hall, Pokhara

5 December 2019; 09:00	Nepal	26 – 24	Bangladesh	Pokhara Covered Hall, Pokhara
5 December 2019; 09:00		(12 – 13)		Pokhara Covered Hall, Pokhara

6 December 2019; 11:45	Bangladesh	34 – 13	Sri Lanka	Pokhara Covered Hall, Pokhara
6 December 2019; 11:45		(16 – 6)		Pokhara Covered Hall, Pokhara

== Final round ==
Semi-finals
7 December
India	41
Bangladesh	13
7 December
Pakistan	21
Nepal	22

Final match
9 December
India	35
Nepal	21
Bronze medal match
9 December
Bangladesh	31
Pakistan	15

=== Semi-finals ===
7 December 2019; 13:45	India	41 – 13	Bangladesh	Pokhara Covered Hall, Pokhara
7 December 2019; 13:45		(20 – 8)		Pokhara Covered Hall, Pokhara

7 December 2019; 16:00	Pakistan	21 – 22	Nepal	Pokhara Covered Hall, Pokhara
7 December 2019; 16:00		(11 – 8)		Pokhara Covered Hall, Pokhara

=== Bronze medal match ===
8 December 2019; 09:15	Bangladesh	31 – 15	Pakistan	Pokhara Covered Hall, Pokhara
8 December 2019; 09:15		(17 – 15)		Pokhara Covered Hall, Pokhara

=== Final ===
8 December 2019; 16:15	India	35 – 21	Nepal	Pokhara Covered Hall, Pokhara
8 December 2019; 16:15		(19 – 8)		Pokhara Covered Hall, Pokhara

== Final standings ==
Rank	Team
1st place, gold medalist(s)	India
2nd place, silver medalist(s)	Nepal
3rd place, bronze medalist(s)	Bangladesh
4	Pakistan
5	Sri Lanka
6	Maldives
