= Afghanistan men's national handball team =

Afghanistan

Information

Colours
| 1st | 2nd |
- Last updated on Unknown.

Afghanistan national handball team is the national handball team of Afghanistan. National team is governed by Afghanistan Handball Federation. Afghanistan handball team affiliated to Asian Handball federation in 2004.
