= Luv Kush Indoor Stadium =

Indoor sports venue in Rajasthan, India

- Luv Kush Stadium
- Location in Rajasthan Location in India
- Location: Udaipur, Rajasthan
- Coordinates: 24.5937164°N 73.6896653°E

The Luv Kush Indoor Stadium is an indoor sports venue in Udaipur, in the Indian state of Rajasthan. It is commonly used for the indoor sports including Badminton and Table Tennis.

== Events ==
- District Badminton Championship 2013 - In August–September 2013, a district level badminton championship was held in this stadium, in which more than 100 students from various districts participated.
- State Level Powerlifting Tournament 2013 - In July 2013, a state level powerlifting tournament was organized, which was inaugurated by Mr. R.S. Meena, where Mr. Raghuveer Singh Meena (Member of Parliament) was the invited chief guest.
- Udaipur Wetland Cyclothon 2013 - In Feb 2013, a wetland cyclothon (cycle ride marathon) was held by Wildlife Wing, Forest Department, Udaipur.

== See also ==
- Maharana Pratap Khel Gaon
