= Kotla Vijay Bhaskar Reddy Indoor Stadium =

Indoor arena in Hyderabad, India

Coordinates: 17.434863°N 78.426434°E

- Interactive map of Kotla Vijay Bhaskar Reddy Indoor Stadium
- Full name: Kotla Vijay Bhaskar Reddy Indoor Stadium
- Location: Hyderabad, Telangana, India
- Owner: Sports Authority of Telangana State
- Operator: Sports Authority of Telangana State
- Surface: Grass

Construction
- Built: 2003
- Opened: 2003

Kotla Vijay Bhaskar Reddy Indoor Stadium is an indoor sporting arena located in Yousufguda, Hyderabad in the Indian state of Telangana. Kotla Vijaya Bhaskara Reddy (16 August 1920 – 27 September 2001) served as the chief minister of the Indian state of United Andhra Pradesh in 1983 and then from 1992 to 1994. The stadium is named after him.

It was inaugurated by N. Chandrababu Naidu, then chief minister in 2003 and the capacity of the arena is 2,000 people. It hosted some events for the Afro-Asian Games in 2003.

This stadium is maintained by the Sports Authority of Telangana State (SATS), the state government department that looks after sports affairs.

== History ==
In November 2007 the stadium opened Hyderabad's biggest roller skating rink, a 100-metre flat track. This rink was built by SATS for skaters trained by Abbas Iqbal Lasania, Andhra Pradesh's first National Roller Skating (Speed) Champion and an International Coach whose students have been representing India at International Skating Competitions, in both roller and ice skating.

The rink was made possible by Lasania's students' parents, Savita Reddy, whose daughter Shraddha Reddy went on to become an Asian Roller Skating Championship medalist in 2010.

Children can come to learn badminton and roller skating in the stadium. Lasania trained hundreds of kids, many of whom represented United Andhra and eventually Telangana at the National Championships.

== Sports, Rallies and Events ==
The stadium is used for giving coaching to multiple sports including Badminton, Basketball, Gymnastics, Martial arts training, skating and Boxing.

Evening and morning coaching are given for these sports and can be enrolled for nominal fee.

It was used for Loksabha election counting place in 2019.

All India Chess Tournament was held in Hyderabad at Kotla Vijaya Bhaskar Reddy Stadium from Jan 14 to 21, 2022 and also in Jan2023.

Also multiple events has been organised in the stadium. Telugu Film Industry Employees Federation has organised the largest May Day celebrations in the Hyderabad at Kotla Vijaya Bhaskar Reddy stadium on May 1, 2022.
