= Handball at the 2005 Islamic Solidarity Games =

- Location: Mecca, Saudi Arabia
- Dates: 9–19 April 2005
- Nations: 13

Medalists
| gold medal | Algeria |
| silver medal | Saudi Arabia |
| bronze medal | Egypt |

Handball at the 2005 Islamic Solidarity Games was held in Mecca from April 9 to April 19, 2005.

== Preliminary round ==
=== Group A ===
| Team | Pts | Pld | W | D | L | GF | GA | GD |
|---|---|---|---|---|---|---|---|---|
| Saudi Arabia | 4 | 2 | 2 | 0 | 0 | 84 | 42 | +42 |
| Morocco | 2 | 2 | 1 | 0 | 1 | 61 | 54 | +7 |
| Pakistan | 0 | 2 | 0 | 0 | 2 | 51 | 100 | -49 |

April 9
| Pakistan | 25 - 56 | Saudi Arabia |
April 10
| Morocco | 44 - 26 | Pakistan |
April 11
| Saudi Arabia | 28 - 17 | Morocco |

=== Group B ===
| Team | Pts | Pld | W | D | L | GF | GA | GD |
|---|---|---|---|---|---|---|---|---|
| Egypt | 4 | 2 | 2 | 0 | 0 | 63 | 55 | +8 |
| Jordan | 2 | 2 | 1 | 0 | 1 | 59 | 57 | +2 |
| Iraq | 0 | 2 | 0 | 0 | 2 | 58 | 68 | -10 |

April 9
| Iraq | 29 - 35 | Egypt |
April 10
| Iraq | 29 - 33 | Jordan |
April 11
| Egypt | 28 - 26 | Jordan |

=== Group C ===
| Team | Pts | Pld | W | D | L | GF | GA | GD |
|---|---|---|---|---|---|---|---|---|
| Bahrain | 4 | 2 | 2 | 0 | 0 | 80 | 62 | +18 |
| Tunisia | 2 | 2 | 1 | 0 | 1 | 76 | 71 | +5 |
| Azerbaijan | 0 | 2 | 0 | 0 | 2 | 57 | 80 | -23 |

April 9
| Azerbaijan | 29 - 42 | Tunisia |
April 10
| Bahrain | 38 - 28 | Azerbaijan |
April 11
| Tunisia | 34 - 42 | Bahrain |

=== Group D ===
| Team | Pts | Pld | W | D | L | GF | GA | GD |
|---|---|---|---|---|---|---|---|---|
| Algeria | 6 | 3 | 3 | 0 | 0 | 98 | 53 | +45 |
| Syria | 4 | 3 | 2 | 0 | 1 | 105 | 81 | +24 |
| Senegal | 2 | 3 | 1 | 0 | 2 | 102 | 84 | +18 |
| Sudan | 0 | 3 | 0 | 0 | 3 | 48 | 135 | -87 |

April 9
| Sudan | 7 - 44 | Algeria |
| Senegal | 33 - 37 | Syria |
April 10
| Syria | 24 - 25 | Algeria |
| Sudan | 18 - 47 | Senegal |
April 11
| Syria | 44 - 23 | Sudan |
| Algeria | 29 - 22 | Senegal |

== Qualifying round ==
=== Group E ===
| Team | Pts | Pld | W | D | L | GF | GA | GD |
|---|---|---|---|---|---|---|---|---|
| Algeria | 6 | 3 | 3 | 0 | 0 | 98 | 87 | +11 |
| Egypt | 4 | 3 | 2 | 0 | 1 | 91 | 81 | +10 |
| Tunisia | 2 | 3 | 1 | 0 | 2 | 99 | 98 | +1 |
| Morocco | 0 | 3 | 0 | 0 | 3 | 92 | 114 | -22 |

April 13
| Egypt | 28 - 22 | Tunisia |
| Algeria | 33 - 28 | Morocco |
April 14
| Algeria | 34 - 32 | Tunisia |
| Morocco | 28 - 36 | Egypt |
April 16
| Morocco | 36 - 45 | Tunisia |
| Algeria | 31 - 27 | Egypt |

=== Group F ===
| Team | Pts | Pld | W | D | L | GF | GA | GD |
|---|---|---|---|---|---|---|---|---|
| Saudi Arabia | 6 | 3 | 3 | 0 | 0 | 94 | 79 | +15 |
| Syria | 3 | 3 | 1 | 1 | 1 | 92 | 91 | +1 |
| Bahrain | 3 | 3 | 1 | 1 | 1 | 91 | 95 | -4 |
| Jordan | 0 | 3 | 0 | 0 | 3 | 87 | 99 | -12 |

April 13
| Saudi Arabia | 35 - 28 | Syria |
| Bahrain | 36 - 35 | Jordan |
April 14
| Syria | 29 - 29 | Bahrain |
| Jordan | 25 - 28 | Saudi Arabia |
April 16
| Syria | 35 - 27 | Jordan |
| Saudi Arabia | 31 - 26 | Bahrain |

== Knockout round ==
Semi-finals
April 18
Algeria | 32
Syria | 27
April 18
Saudi Arabia | 24
Egypt | 22

Final
April 19
Algeria | 25
Saudi Arabia | 23
Bronze-final
April 19
Syria | 28
Egypt | 32
