= Nepal men's national handball team =

Nepal

Information
- Association: Nepal Handball Association

Colours
1st	2nd

Results

Asian Championship
- Appearances: 1 (First in 1987)
- Best result: 11th (1987)
- Last updated on Unknown.

The Nepal national handball team is the national handball team of Nepal and is controlled by the Nepal Handball Association (NHA).

== Tournament history ==
=== Asian Championship ===
- 1987 – 11th place

=== South Asian Games ===
- 2010 – 4th place
- 2016 – 4th place
- 2019 – 5th place
