= Nepal women's national handball team =

Nepal

Information
- Association: Nepal Handball Association

Colours
1st	2nd

Results

Summer Olympics
- Appearances: No

World Championship
- Appearances: No

Asian Women's Handball Championship
- Appearances: No
- Last updated on 3 April 2018.

Nepal women's national handball team
Medal record

South Asian Women's Handball Championship
Bronze medal – third place	2013 Lucknow	

The Nepal national women's handball team is the national handball team of Nepal and is controlled by the Nepal Handball Association (NHA).

== Current squad ==
The following 16-player squad was selected by the NHA for the 2019 South Asian Games.

No.	Pos.	Name	Date of birth (age)	Height	App.	Goals	Club
1		Ram Kumari Chaudhary					(Nepal) Nepalese Army
2		Kabita Rai					(Nepal) Nepalese Army
3		Durga Bohora					(Nepal) Nepalese Army
4		Shantikala Rai					(Nepal) Nepalese Army
5		Dev Kumari Baskota					(Nepal) Nepalese Army
6		Babita Shrestha					(Nepal) Nepalese Army
7		Sharda B.K.					(Nepal) Nepalese Army
8		Uma Rai					(Nepal) Armed Police Force
9		Bandana Rai					(Nepal) Armed Police Force
10		Sangita Chaudhary					(Nepal) Armed Police Force
11		Nisha Rai					(Nepal) Province No. 1
12		Ranjana Rai					(Nepal) Province No. 1
13		Jhin Maya Thapa					(Nepal) Gandaki Province
14		Archana Neupane					(Nepal) Nepalese Army
15		Kalpana Oli					(Nepal) Nepalese Army
16		Aaita Lamhu Shrepa					(Nepal) Armed Police Force

== Tournament history ==
=== Asian Games ===
- 2022 : 9th

=== South Asian Games ===
- 2016 : 4th
- 2019 : (silver)

=== South Asian Women's Handball Championship ===
- 2008: 4th
- 2013 : (bronze)
- 2018: (silver)
