= Commonwealth Handball Association =

Commonwealth Handball Association CHA
- Sport: Handball
- Other sports: Beach Handball; Wheelchair handball

HISTORY
- Year of formation: 1985; 41 years ago

DEMOGRAPHICS
- Membership size: 34 Members

AFFILIATIONS
- International federation: International Handball Federation (IHF)

GOVERNING BODY
- Acting President: (Cyprus) General Charalambos Lottas

HEADQUARTERS
- Address: Moshood Abiola National Stadium Velodrome, Abuja
- Country: Nigeria
- Secretary General: (Nigeria) General Jibril Saidu

The Commonwealth Handball Association (CHA) is the governing body for the Olympic sport of handball (also known as European Handball or Olympic Handball) in the British Commonwealth.

== History ==
Originally set up in Salford (England) 1985 to try to get Handball into the Commonwealth Games, the CHA has grown to 34 member nations. The aim was to attain greater recognition for the English language speaking nations within the IHF; represent the interest of Commonwealth nations within the IHF; develop technical expertise through coaching and refereeing; promote friendship through competitions; promote handball throughout the Commonwealth; get handball into the Commonwealth Games as a team sport.

== CHA Secretaries General ==
S. No.	Name	Tenure
1.	(Nigeria) Maj. Gen. Ishola Williams	1985 – 2021
2.	(Nigeria) Jibril Saidu	5 December 2021 – till date

== Member Nations ==
- Australia
- Bangladesh
- Botswana
- Cameroon
- Canada
- Cook Islands
- Cyprus
- England
- Fiji
- (The Gambia) Gambia
- Ghana
- Hong Kong, China
- India
- Kenya
- Kiribati
- Lesotho
- Malawi
- Mozambique
- New Zealand
- Nigeria
- Pakistan
- Papua New Guinea
- Rwanda
- Samoa
- Scotland
- Seychelles
- Sierra Leone
- Singapore
- Solomon Islands
- South Africa
- Tanzania
- Uganda
- Zambia
- Zimbabwe
