= Rajasthan State Sports Council =

Agency overview
- Type: Sports administration and sports infrastructure development body
- Jurisdiction: Government of Rajasthan
- Headquarters: Jaipur, Rajasthan
- Minister responsible: Chairman
- Agency executive: Chief executive officer and executive director
- Parent agency: Department of Youth Affairs and Sports Government of Rajasthan

Rajasthan State Sports Council is the apex body in Rajasthan at the State level to look after the development of sports activities and providing coaching to the players of the state. It was set up in 1957 by the Government of Rajasthan.and it is registered as a society under Rajasthan state society act, 1958. Mr. V.G. Kanetkar was the first president of the council. Organisation---> •Governor of Rajasthan is the chief patron of RSSC. •Chief minister of Rajasthan is deputy patron of RSSC. •The chairman of the council is the chief executive. •Apart from the chairman the council also include vice president, Treasurer and 12 members nominated by the state government. •6 officers are ex officio members.
