= Bangladesh women's national handball team =

Bangladesh

Information
- Association: Bangladesh Handball Federation (BHF)
- Coach: Md Jahirul Islam Rana
- Captain: Rubina Islam

Colours
1st	2nd

Results

Summer Olympics
- Appearances: 0

World Championship
- Appearances: 0

South Asian Games
- Appearances: 2 (First in 2016)
- Best result: Runners-up (2016)
- Last updated on 14 November 2025.

The Bangladesh women's national handball team is the national women's handball team of Bangladesh which represent Bangladesh in the world handball tournament. and is controlled by the Bangladesh Handball Federation.

== Competitions records ==
=== Summer Olympic ===
Champions Runners up

Summer Olympic records
Host	Result	Position	GP	W	D	L	GF	GA
(Canada) 1976	Did not qualify							
(Soviet Union) 1980	Did not qualify							
(United States) 1984	Did not qualify							
(South Korea) 1988	Did not qualify							
(Spain) 1992	Did not qualify							
(United States) 1996	Did not qualify							
(Australia) 2000	Did not qualify							
(Greece) 2004	Did not qualify							
(China) 2008	Did not qualify							
(United Kingdom) 2012	Did not qualify							
(Brazil) 2016	Did not qualify							
(Japan) 2020	Did not qualify							
(France) 2024
Total	0/12	0 Title	0	0	0	0	0	0

=== World Championship ===
Champions Runners up

World Championship records
Host	Result	Position	GP	W	D	L	GF	GA
(Socialist Federal Republic of Yugoslavia) 1957	Part of Pakistan							
(Romania) 1962	Part of Pakistan							
(West Germany) 1965	Part of Pakistan							
(Netherlands) 1971	Did not qualify							
(Socialist Federal Republic of Yugoslavia) 1973	Did not qualify							
(Soviet Union) 1975	Did not qualify							
(Czechoslovakia) 1978	Did not qualify							
(Hungary) 1982	Did not qualify							
(Netherlands) 1986	Did not qualify							
(South Korea) 1990	Did not qualify							
(Norway) 1993	Did not qualify							
(Austria) (Hungary) 1995	Did not qualify							
(Germany) 1997	Did not qualify							
(Denmark) (Norway) 1999	Did not qualify							
(Italy) 2001	Did not qualify							
(Croatia) 2003	Did not qualify							
(Russia) 2005	Did not qualify							
(France) 2007	Did not qualify							
(China) 2009	Did not qualify							
(Brazil) 2011	Did not qualify							
(Serbia) 2013	Did not qualify							
(Denmark) 2015	Did not qualify							
(Germany) 2017	Did not qualify							
(Japan) 2019	Did not qualify							
(Spain) 2021	Did not qualify							
(Denmark) (Norway) (Sweden) 2023	Did not qualify							
(Germany) (Netherlands) 2025	Did not qualify							
(Hungary) 2027	To be determined							
(Spain) 2029	To be determined							
(Czech Republic) (Poland) 2031	To be determined							
Total	0/17	0 Title	0	0	0	0	0	0

=== Asian Championship ===
Champions Runners up

Asian Women's Handball Championship records
Host	Result	Position	GP	W	D	L	GF	GA
(China) 1993	Did not participate							
(South Korea) 1995	Did not participate							
(Jordan) 1997	Did not participate							
(Japan) 1999	Did not participate							
(China) 2000	Did not participate							
(Kazakhstan) 2002	Did not participate							
(Japan) 2004	Did not participate							
(China) 2006	Did not participate							
(Thailand) 2008	Did not participate							
(Kazakhstan) 2010	Did not participate							
(Indonesia) 2012	Did not participate							
(Indonesia) 2015	Did not participate							
(South Korea) 2017	Did not participate							
(Japan) 2018	Did not participate							
(Jordan) 2021	Did not participate							
(South Korea) 2022	Did not participate							
(India) 2024	Did not participate							
(Kazakhstan) 2026	Withdrawn							
Total	0/18	0 Title	0	0	0	0	0	0

=== Asian Games ===
Champions Runners up

Asian Games records
Host	Result	Position	GP	W	D	L	GF	GA
(China) 1990	Did not participate							
(Japan) 1994	Did not participate							
(Thailand) 1998	Did not participate							
(South Korea) 2002	Did not participate							
(Qatar) 2006	Did not participate							
(China) 2010	Did not participate							
(South Korea) 2014	Did not participate							
(Indonesia) 2018	Did not participate							
(China) 2022	Did not participate							
(Japan) 2026	To be determined							
(Qatar) 2030	To be determined							
(Saudi Arabia) 2034	To be determined							
Total	0/9	0 Title	0	0	0	0	0	0

=== South Asian Games ===
Champions Runners up

South Asian Games records
Host	Result	Position	GP	W	D	L	GF	GA
(India) 2016	Runners-up	2/7	5	4	0	1	192	129
(Nepal) 2019	3rd-place	3/6	4	2	0	2	130	95
(Pakistan) 2027	To be determined							
Total	2/2	0 Title	9	6	0	3	322	224

== See also ==
- Bangladesh men's national handball team
