= India men's national handball team =

India

Information
- Association: Handball Association of India
- Coach: Shivaji Sindhu
- Assistant coach: Binoy Damodaran; Ajay Kumar; Naveen Punia

Colours
1st	2nd

Results

Asian Championship
- Appearances: 6 (First in 1979)
- Best result: 5th (1979)
- Last updated on Unknown.

India men's national handball team
Medal record

South Asian Games
Gold medal – first place	2016 India	Team
Silver medal – second place	2010 Bangladesh	Team
Silver medal – second place	2019 Nepal	Team

South Asian Championship
Gold medal – first place	1996 Jaipur	
Silver medal – second place	2000 Dhaka	
Gold medal – first place	2014 Noida	

Central Asian Open Championship
Bronze medal – third place	2024 Uzbekistan	

The India national handball team is the national handball team of India and is controlled by the Handball Association of India.

== Tournament record ==
=== Olympic Games ===
- Handball at the 2020 Summer Olympics – Asian men's qualification tournament
- Handball at the 2024 Summer Olympics – Asian men's qualification tournament

=== Asian Championship ===
No	Year	Host	Rank	M	W	D	L	GF	GA	GD
1	1979	Nanjing, China	5th	4	0	0	4	55	164	−109
2	1995	Kuwait City, Kuwait	9th	2	0	0	2	—N/a	—N/a	—N/a
3	2018	Suwon, South Korea	12th	6	2	0	4	176	167	+9
4	2022	Dammam, Saudi Arabia	15th	7	1	0	6	194	248	−54
5	2024	Bahrain	16th	7	0	0	7	147	316	−169
6	2026	Sabah Al-Salem, Kuwait	15th	6	0	0	6	123	239	−116
Total			6/22	32	3	0	29	695	1134	-439

=== Asian Games ===
No	Year	Host	Rank	M	W	D	L	GF	GA	GD
1	1982	New Delhi, India	8th	4	0	0	4	73	126	−53
2	2006	Doha, Qatar	12th	5	1	0	4	141	185	−44
3	2010	Guangzhou, China	9th	6	2	0	4	187	223	−36
4	2014	Incheon, South Korea	14th	4	0	0	4	76	157	−81
5	2018	Jakarta and Palembang, Indonesia	10th	7	3	0	4	223	224	−1
Total			5/12	26	6	0	20	700	915	-215

=== South Asian Games ===
No	Year	Host	Position
2	2010	Dhaka, Bangladesh	2nd place, silver medalist(s)
1	2016	Guwahati, India	1st place, gold medalist(s)
2	2019	Kathmandu and Pokhara, Nepal	2nd place, silver medalist(s)

=== IHF Emerging Nations Championship ===
- 2019 – 9th place
- 2023 – 4th place

=== South Asian Championship ===
- 1996 – (gold)
- 2000 – (silver)
- 2014 – (gold)

=== Central Asian Open Handball Championship ===
- 2024 – (bronze)

=== Asian Junior Championship ===
No	Year	Rank	M	W	D	L	GF	GA	GD
1	(Iran) 1990	8th	—N/a	—N/a	—N/a	—N/a	—N/a	—N/a	—N/a
2	(Iran) 2000	10th	—N/a	—N/a	—N/a	—N/a	—N/a	—N/a	—N/a
3	(India) 2004	10th	6	1	1	4	199	212	-13
4	(Japan) 2006	8th	5	1	0	4	121	179	-58
5	(Jordan) 2008	12th	4	0	0	4	109	158	-49
6	(Jordan) 2016	11th	5	1	0	4	168	269	-101
7	(Oman) 2018	11th	8	4	0	4	277	302	-25
8	(Bahrain) 2022	8th	5	0	0	5	89	233	-144
9	(Jordan) 2024	12th	6	1	0	5	204	336	-132
10	(China) 2026	13th	6	0	0	6	109	308	-199
Total		10/19	45	8	1	36	1276	1998	-721

=== Asian Youth Championship ===
No	Year	Rank	M	W	D	L	GF	GA	GD
1	(Thailand) 2005	7th	4	1	0	3	91	129	−38
2	(Jordan) 2008	11th	5	0	0	5	129	222	-93
3	(Jordan) 2018	6th	6	1	0	5	148	206	-58
4	(Bahrain) 2022	10th	5	0	0	5	114	240	-126
5	(Jordan) 2024	13th	6	0	0	6	73	187	-114
5	(Jordan) 2026	10th	5	0	0	5	130	180	-50
Total		6/11	31	2	0	29	685	1116	-479
