= Bangladesh men's national handball team =

Bangladesh

Information
- Association: Bangladesh Handball Federation
- Coach: Mohammad Salauddin Ahammed
- Captain: MH Akash

Colours
1st	2nd

Results

Summer Olympics
- Appearances: 0

World Championship
- Appearances: 0

Asian Championship
- Appearances: 1 (First in 2018)
- Best result: 13th (2018)
- Last updated on 9 November 2025.

The Bangladesh national handball team is the national handball team of Bangladesh and is controlled by the Bangladesh Handball Federation.

== Tournament history ==
=== Summer Olympic ===
Champions Runners up

Summer Olympics records
Host	Result	Position	GP	W	D	L	GF	GA
(Germany) 1936	Did not qualify							
(West Germany) 1972	Did not qualify							
(Canada) 1976	Did not qualify							
(Soviet Union) 1980	Did not qualify							
(United States) 1984	Did not qualify							
(South Korea) 1988	Did not qualify							
(Spain) 1992	Did not qualify							
(United States) 1996	Did not qualify							
(Australia) 2000	Did not qualify							
(Greece) 2004	Did not qualify							
(China) 2008	Did not qualify							
(United Kingdom) 2012	Did not qualify							
(Brazil) 2016	Did not qualify							
(Japan) 2020	Did not qualify							
(France) 2024	Did not qualify							
(United States) 2028	To be determined							
(Australia) 2032	To be determined							
Total	0/15	0 Title	0	0	0	0	0	0

=== World Championship ===
Champions Runners up

World Championship records
Host	Result	Position	GP	W	D	L	GF	GA
(Nazi Germany) 1938	Did not qualify							
(Sweden) 1954	Did not qualify							
(East Germany) 1958	Did not qualify							
(West Germany) 1961	Did not qualify							
(Czechoslovakia) 1964	Did not qualify							
(Sweden) 1967	Did not qualify							
(France) 1970	Did not qualify							
(East Germany) 1974	Did not qualify							
(Denmark) 1978	Did not qualify							
(West Germany) 1982	Did not qualify							
(Switzerland) 1986	Did not qualify							
(Czechoslovakia) 1990	Did not qualify							
(Sweden) 1993	Did not qualify							
(Iceland) 1995	Did not qualify							
(Japan) 1997	Did not qualify							
(Egypt) 1999	Did not qualify							
(France) 2001	Did not qualify							
(Portugal) 2003	Did not qualify							
(Tunisia) 2005	Did not qualify							
(Germany) 2007	Did not qualify							
(Croatia) 2009	Did not qualify							
(Sweden) 2011	Did not qualify							
(Spain) 2013	Did not qualify							
(Qatar) 2015	Did not qualify							
(France) 2017	Did not qualify							
(Denmark) (Germany) 2019	Did not qualify							
(Egypt) 2021	Did not qualify							
(Poland) (Sweden) 2023	Did not qualify							
(Croatia) (Denmark) (Norway) 2025	Did not qualify							
(Germany) 2027	To be determined							
(France) (Germany) 2029	To be determined							
(Denmark) (Iceland) (Norway) 2031	To be determined							
Total	0/32	0 Title	0	0	0	0	0	0

=== Asian Championship ===
Champions Runners up

Asian Men's Handball Championship records
Host	Result	Position	GP	W	D	L	GF	GA
(Kuwait) 1977	Did not participate							
(China) 1979	Did not participate							
(South Korea) 1983	Did not participate							
(Jordan) 1987	Did not participate							
(China) 1989	Did not participate							
(Japan) 1991	Did not participate							
(Bahrain) 1993	Did not participate							
(Kuwait) 1995	Did not participate							
(Japan) 2000	Did not participate							
(Iran) 2002	Did not participate							
(Qatar) 2004	Did not participate							
(Thailand) 2006	Did not participate							
(Iran) 2008	Did not participate							
(Iran) 2010	Did not participate							
(Saudi Arabia) 2012	Did not participate							
(Bahrain) 2014	Did not participate							
(Bahrain) 2016	Did not participate							
(South Korea) 2018	Group stage	13/14	5	0	0	5	78	193
(Kuwait) 2020	Did not participate							
(Saudi Arabia) 2022	Did not participate							
(Bahrain) 2024	Did not participate							
Total	1/25	0 Title	5	0	0	5	78	193

=== Asian Games ===
Champions Runners up

Asian Games records
Host	Result	Position	GP	W	D	L	GF	GA
(India) 1982	Did not participate							
(South Korea) 1986	Did not participate							
(China) 1990	Did not participate							
(Japan) 1994	Did not participate							
(Thailand) 1998	Did not participate							
(South Korea) 2002	Did not participate							
(Qatar) 2006	Did not participate							
(China) 2010	Did not participate							
(South Korea) 2014	Did not participate							
(Indonesia) 2018	Did not participate							
(China) 2022	Did not participate							
Total	0/11	0 Title	0	0	0	0	0	0

=== Islamic Solidarity Games ===
Champions Runners up

Islamic Solidarity Games records
Host	Result	Position	GP	W	D	L	GF	GA
(Saudi Arabia) 2005	Did not participate							
(Azerbaijan) 2017	Did not participate							
(Turkey) 2021	Did not participate							
Total	0/3	0 Title	0	0	0	0	0	0

== See also ==
- Bangladesh women's national handball team
