= Pakistan men's national handball team =

Sports team in Pakistan

Pakistan

Information
- Association: Pakistan Handball Federation
- Coach: Naseer Ahmed And Azhar Ul Haq
- Assistant coach: Muhammad Sohaib
- Captain: Mohammad Uzair Atif

Colours
1st	2nd

Results

Summer Olympics
- Appearances: None

World Championship
- Appearances: None

Asian Championship
- Appearances: None
- Last updated on 9 April 2020.

Pakistan men's national handball team
Medal record

South Asian Games
Gold medal – first place	2010 Bangladesh	
Gold medal – first place	2019 Nepal	
Silver medal – second place	2016 India	

The Pakistan national handball team (Urdu: پاکستان قومى ہینڈبال ٹیم) is controlled by the Pakistan Handball Federation and represents Pakistan in international tournaments.

== Historical results ==
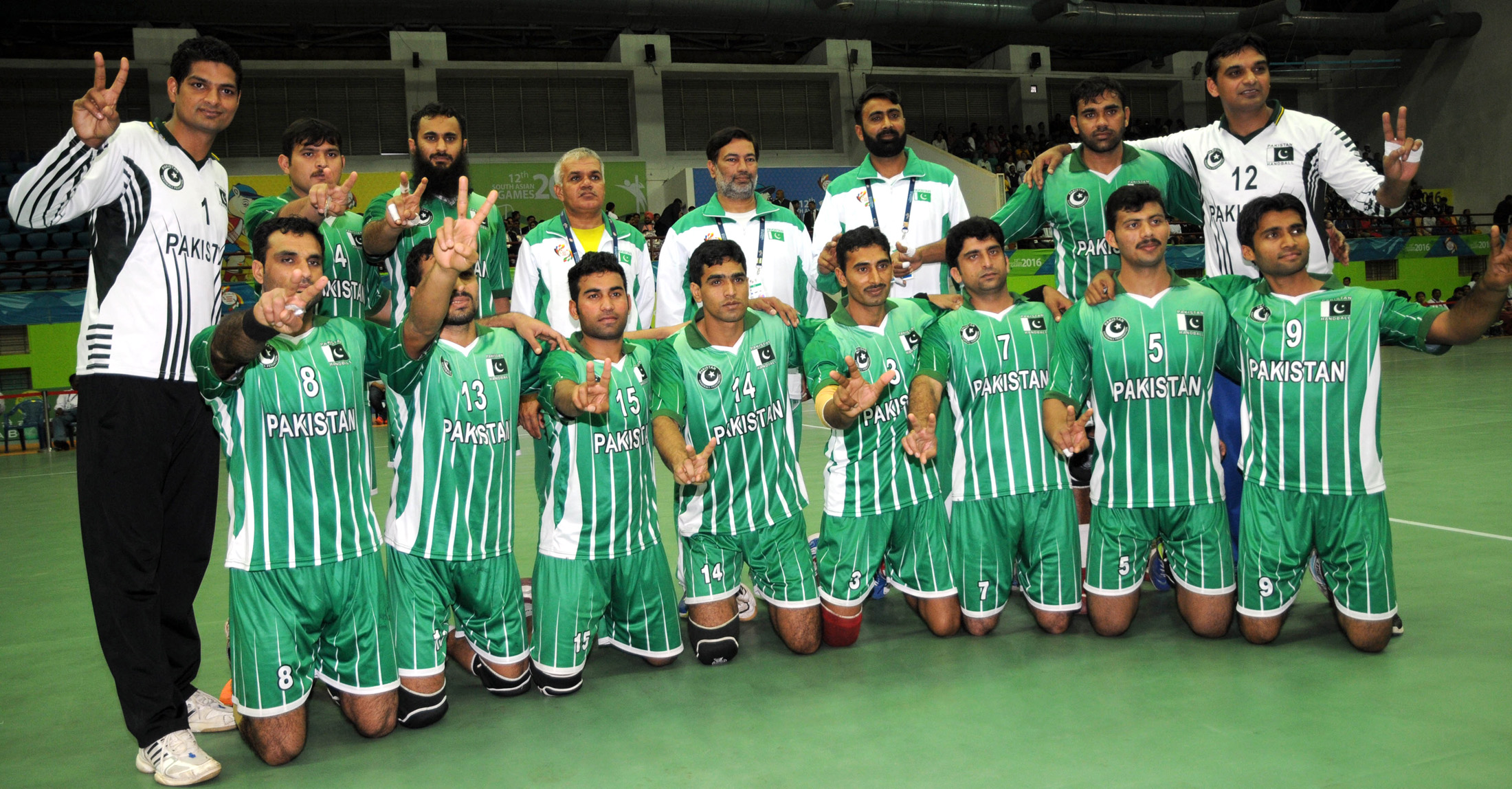
The Silver Medal winning Pakistan men handball team at the 2016 South Asian Games

Pakistan is one of the most successful handball team of South Asia, winning 2 gold and 1 silver medal at the South Asian Games.

Pakistan won gold in the 2010 and 2019 edition of the South Asian Games beating India by 37–31 and 30–29 respectively.

In the 2016 edition, Pakistan unfortunately lost to the hosts India, score being 32–31.

== Honours ==
Following is the list of honours claimed by Pakistan national handball team:

Year	Event	Venue	Position
1995	Commonwealth Men's Youth Handball Championship	(Bangladesh) Dhaka
1996	South Asian Men's Handball Championship	(India) Jaipur
1997	Commonwealth Men's Handball Championship	(United Kingdom) London
2004	Indo-Pak Punjab Games	(India) Patiala
2005	1st Islamic Solidarity Games	(Saudi Arabia) Mecca	Participation
2007	South Asian Men's Youth Handball Championship	(Pakistan) Islamabad
2010	South Asian Games	(Bangladesh) Dhaka
2010	IHF Trophy South Asia Zone (U-21)	(Bangladesh) Dhaka
2011	IHF Trophy South Asia Zone (U-21)	(India) Chennai
2012	IHF Trophy South & Central Asia (U-21)	(Nepal) Kathmandu
2014	3rd South Asian Men's Handball Championship	(India) Noida
2014	IHF Trophy South Asia Zone (U-21)	(Pakistan) Faisalabad
2015	IHF Trophy Asia Continental Phase (U-21)	(Thailand) Bangkok
2016	12th South Asian Games	(India) Guwahati
2016	IHF Trophy South & Central Asia (U-21)	(Bangladesh) Dhaka
2017	4th Islamic Solidarity Games	(Azerbaijan) Baku	7th place
2018	IHF Trophy South & Central Asia (U-21)	(Pakistan) Faisalabad
2018	IHF Trophy South & Central Asia (U-19)	(Pakistan) Faisalabad
2019	13th South Asian Games	(Nepal) Pokhara

== Current squad ==
Squad for the 2019 South Asian Games.

Head coach: Naseer Ahmed

No.	Pos.	Name	Date of birth (age)	Height	App.	Goals	Club
1		Asif Ali
2		Muzammal Hussain
3		Muhammad Sahid Bashir
4		Asim Saeed
5		Muaaz Ali
6		Muhammad Zubair
7		Hazrat Hussain
8		Umar Hussain
9		Asif Hayat
10		Nasir Hussain
11		Naveed-ur-Rehman
12		Muhammad Uzair Atif
13		Imran Khan
14		Muhammad Mubeen Ashraf
