= Handball Federation of India =

Sports governing body in India

- IOC nation: Republic of India (IND)
- Sport: Handball
- Other sports: Beach handball; Wheelchair handball
- Official website: handballfederationofindia.com

History
- Year of formation: 10 October 1971; 54 years ago
- Former names
- Participation levels

Affiliations
- International federation members page: %c2%a0
- International federation member since: 1974
- Member of NOC since
- Other affiliation(s): Ministry of Youth Affairs and Sports

Elected
- President: Mahesh Kumar
- Life-president: Dr. Roshan Lal Anand

Secretariat
- Address: 24A, Nanak Nagar, Pipliya Rao; Indore 452012
- Secretary General: Dr. Pritpal Singh Saluja
- Founder: Jagat Singh Chauhan

Handball Federation of India (HFI) is registered under the Societies Registration Act, 1860 at Rohtak. It became a member of the Asian Handball Federation (AHF) and the International Handball Federation (IHF) in 1974. It had also been a member of the Commonwealth Handball Association and the South Asian Handball Federation.

== National team ==
- India national wheelchair handball team

== See also ==
- Handball Association of India
