= Kelsey =

Kelsey may refer to:

== Places ==
=== Canada ===
- Kelsey, Alberta
- Kelsey, Manitoba
- Rural Municipality of Kelsey, Manitoba (unconnected with Kelsey, Manitoba)
- Kelsey Airport, Manitoba
- SIAST Kelsey Campus, one of four campuses of the Saskatchewan Institute of Applied Science and Technology in Saskatoon

=== United States ===
- Kelsey, California in El Dorado County
- Kelseyville, California in Lake County; formerly called Kelsey, California
- Kelsey Lake Diamond Mine, a defunct diamond mine in the U.S. state of Colorado
- Kelsey, Ohio
- Kelsey Peak, a mountain in Utah
- Kelsey, Texas
- Kelsey Museum of Archaeology at the University of Michigan
- Mount Kelsey, a mountain in New Hampshire

== People ==
- Kelsey (surname)
- Kelsey (given name)

== Other uses ==
- Kelsey (automobile company)
- "Kelsey" (song), a 2007 single by Metro Station from their debut album, Metro Station
- Kelsey, a fashion doll in the 2001 series of Groovy Girls dolls, manufactured by Manhattan Toy

== See also ==
=== Different spellings ===
- Kelsay, Indian scout serving in the United States Army during the Indian Wars who received the Medal of Honor
- Kelsay (surname)
- Kelsea
- Kelsea Ballerini
- Kelsy
- Kelcy
- Kelcey (disambiguation)
