= 2018 Women's Youth World Handball Championship =

2018 Women's Youth (U-18) World Handball Championship

Tournament details
- Host country: Poland
- Venue(s): 2 (in 1 host city)
- Dates: 7–19 August
- Teams: 24 (from 4 confederations)

Final positions
- Champions: Russia (3rd title)
- Runners-up: Hungary
- Third place: South Korea
- Fourth place: Sweden

Tournament statistics
- Matches played: 91
- Goals scored: 4,668 (51.3 per match)
- Top scorer(s): (Netherlands) Nikita van der Vliet (64 goals)

Awards
- Best player: (Russia) Elena Mikhaylichenko

The 2018 Women's Youth World Handball Championship was the seventh edition of the tournament and took place in Kielce, Poland from 7 to 19 August 2018.

Russia defeated Hungary in the final to win their second straight and third overall title.

== Qualification ==
Competition	Dates	Vacancies	Qualified
Host	7 November 2015	1	Poland
2017 European Women's U-17 Handball Championship	10–20 August 2017	13	Germany; Norway; Hungary; France; Russia; Denmark; Romania; Spain; Sweden; Netherlands; Montenegro; Slovakia; Croatia
2017 Asian Women's Youth Handball Championship	20–28 August 2017	4	South Korea; Japan; China; Kazakhstan
2017 African Women's Youth Handball Championship	11–17 September 2017	3	Egypt; Tunisia; Angola
2018 Pan American Women's Youth Handball Championship	10–14 April 2018	3	~~Brazil~~; Chile; Argentina

Brazil was unable to participate and therefore Austria was being named to replace them.

== Venues ==
The championship will be played at two venues in Kielce. All the venue capacities are the capacity for handball events.

Kielce is located in Poland
Kielce is located in Poland	Legionów Hall; Capacity: 3,030	Politechnika Hall; Capacity: 1,000

== Draw ==
The draw was held on 26 April 2018 in Basel, Switzerland.

=== Seeding ===
Pot 1	Pot 2	Pot 3	Pot 4	Pot 5	Pot 6
Germany; Norway; South Korea; Hungary	France; Russia; Denmark; Romania	Poland; Spain; Japan; Egypt	Tunisia; Sweden; ~~Brazil~~; China	Angola; Netherlands; Chile; Kazakhstan	Croatia; Montenegro; Argentina; Slovakia

== Preliminary round ==
All time are local (UTC+2).

=== Group A ===
Pos	Team	Pld	W	D	L	GF	GA	GD	Pts	Qualification
1	Romania	5	4	1	0	126	95	+31	9	Eightfinals
2	Germany	5	4	0	1	128	100	+28	8	Eightfinals
3	Poland (H)	5	3	0	2	126	127	−1	6	Eightfinals
4	Austria	5	2	0	3	110	133	−23	4	Eightfinals
5	Slovakia	5	1	0	4	113	128	−15	2	
6	Angola	5	0	1	4	100	120	−20	1	

Source: IHF
Rules for classification: 1) Points; 2) Head-to-head points; 3) Head-to-head goal difference; 4) Head-to-head goals scored; 5) Goal difference; 6) Goals scored; 7) Draw.
(H) Hosts

7 August 2018; 10:00	Germany	26–17	Austria	Legionów Hall, Kielce; Attendance: 100; Referees: Gasmi, Gasmi (FRA)
7 August 2018; 10:00	Michalczik 6	(14–8)	Neidhart 6	Legionów Hall, Kielce; Attendance: 100; Referees: Gasmi, Gasmi (FRA)
7 August 2018; 10:00	3× (yellow card) 5× (suspension)	Report	2× (suspension)	Legionów Hall, Kielce; Attendance: 100; Referees: Gasmi, Gasmi (FRA)

7 August 2018; 12:00	Romania	22–21	Slovakia	Legionów Hall, Kielce; Attendance: 150; Referees: Bolic, Hurich (AUT)
7 August 2018; 12:00	Balaceanu, Vîlcan 4	(10–11)	Trepáčová 6	Legionów Hall, Kielce; Attendance: 150; Referees: Bolic, Hurich (AUT)
7 August 2018; 12:00	1× (yellow card) 5× (suspension)	Report	3× (yellow card) 2× (suspension)	Legionów Hall, Kielce; Attendance: 150; Referees: Bolic, Hurich (AUT)

7 August 2018; 18:30	Poland	26–19	Angola	Legionów Hall, Kielce; Attendance: 3,000; Referees: Alpaidze, Berezkina (RUS)
7 August 2018; 18:30	Szczepanik 6	(13–10)	Kiala 7	Legionów Hall, Kielce; Attendance: 3,000; Referees: Alpaidze, Berezkina (RUS)
7 August 2018; 18:30	1× (yellow card) 5× (suspension)	Report	1× (yellow card) 6× (suspension)	Legionów Hall, Kielce; Attendance: 3,000; Referees: Alpaidze, Berezkina (RUS)

9 August 2018; 16:00	Austria	19–37	Romania	Legionów Hall, Kielce; Attendance: 200; Referees: Alpaidze, Berezkina (RUS)
9 August 2018; 16:00	Neidhart 7	(8–21)	Balaceanu, Ilie 6	Legionów Hall, Kielce; Attendance: 200; Referees: Alpaidze, Berezkina (RUS)
9 August 2018; 16:00	1× (yellow card) 5× (suspension)	Report	2× (yellow card) 7× (suspension) 1× (red card)	Legionów Hall, Kielce; Attendance: 200; Referees: Alpaidze, Berezkina (RUS)

9 August 2018; 18:00	Slovakia	26–29	Poland	Legionów Hall, Kielce; Attendance: 2,200; Referees: Covalciuc, Covaliuc (MDA)
9 August 2018; 18:00	Trepáčová 8	(13–13)	Więckowska 10	Legionów Hall, Kielce; Attendance: 2,200; Referees: Covalciuc, Covaliuc (MDA)
9 August 2018; 18:00	3× (yellow card) 6× (suspension)	Report	2× (yellow card) 4× (suspension) 1× (red card)	Legionów Hall, Kielce; Attendance: 2,200; Referees: Covalciuc, Covaliuc (MDA)

9 August 2018; 20:00	Angola	19–28	Germany	Legionów Hall, Kielce; Attendance: 150; Referees: Doychinov, Goretsov (BUL)
9 August 2018; 20:00	Kiala 5	(12–13)	Von Pereira 7	Legionów Hall, Kielce; Attendance: 150; Referees: Doychinov, Goretsov (BUL)
9 August 2018; 20:00	1× (yellow card) 5× (suspension)	Report	2× (yellow card) 4× (suspension)	Legionów Hall, Kielce; Attendance: 150; Referees: Doychinov, Goretsov (BUL)

10 August 2018; 16:00	Germany	27–19	Slovakia	Legionów Hall, Kielce; Attendance: 120; Referees: Burgos, Delgardo (ARG)
10 August 2018; 16:00	three players 4	(12–7)	Mészáros 7	Legionów Hall, Kielce; Attendance: 120; Referees: Burgos, Delgardo (ARG)
10 August 2018; 16:00	1× (yellow card) 2× (suspension)	Report	1× (yellow card) 2× (suspension)	Legionów Hall, Kielce; Attendance: 120; Referees: Burgos, Delgardo (ARG)

10 August 2018; 18:00	Romania	28–19	Poland	Legionów Hall, Kielce; Attendance: 1,800; Referees: Gasmi, Gasmi (FRA)
10 August 2018; 18:00	Cace 7	(13–10)	Haric 9	Legionów Hall, Kielce; Attendance: 1,800; Referees: Gasmi, Gasmi (FRA)
10 August 2018; 18:00	1× (yellow card) 5× (suspension)	Report	2× (yellow card) 5× (suspension)	Legionów Hall, Kielce; Attendance: 1,800; Referees: Gasmi, Gasmi (FRA)

10 August 2018; 20:00	Austria	23–20	Angola	Legionów Hall, Kielce; Referees: Al-Zayyat, Eial (JOR)
10 August 2018; 20:00	Fehringer 7	(12–11)	Masseu 11	Legionów Hall, Kielce; Referees: Al-Zayyat, Eial (JOR)
10 August 2018; 20:00	1× (yellow card) 7× (suspension)	Report	2× (yellow card) 5× (suspension)	Legionów Hall, Kielce; Referees: Al-Zayyat, Eial (JOR)

12 August 2018; 16:00	Romania	19–19	Angola	Legionów Hall, Kielce; Attendance: 250; Referees: Doychinov, Goretsov (BUL)
12 August 2018; 16:00	Ilie, Valcan 4	(12–8)	Masseu 11	Legionów Hall, Kielce; Attendance: 250; Referees: Doychinov, Goretsov (BUL)
12 August 2018; 16:00	1× (yellow card) 3× (suspension)	Report	7× (suspension) 1× (red card)	Legionów Hall, Kielce; Attendance: 250; Referees: Doychinov, Goretsov (BUL)

12 August 2018; 18:00	Poland	25–30	Germany	Legionów Hall, Kielce; Attendance: 2,500; Referees: Burgos, Delgado (ARG)
12 August 2018; 18:00	Sobecka 7	(13–14)	Von Pereira 9	Legionów Hall, Kielce; Attendance: 2,500; Referees: Burgos, Delgado (ARG)
12 August 2018; 18:00	2× (yellow card) 1× (suspension) 1× (red card)	Report	2× (yellow card) 2× (suspension)	Legionów Hall, Kielce; Attendance: 2,500; Referees: Burgos, Delgado (ARG)

12 August 2018; 20:00	Slovakia	23–27	Austria	Legionów Hall, Kielce; Attendance: 89; Referees: El-Saied, El-Saied (EGY)
12 August 2018; 20:00	Mészáros, Trepáčová 6	(12–14)	Neidhart 12	Legionów Hall, Kielce; Attendance: 89; Referees: El-Saied, El-Saied (EGY)
12 August 2018; 20:00	3× (yellow card) 9× (suspension)	Report	1× (yellow card) 3× (suspension)	Legionów Hall, Kielce; Attendance: 89; Referees: El-Saied, El-Saied (EGY)

13 August 2018; 16:00	Angola	23–24	Slovakia	Legionów Hall, Kielce; Attendance: 95; Referees: Reyes, Zúñiga (CUB)
13 August 2018; 16:00	Masseu 7	(13–10)	Trepáčová 7	Legionów Hall, Kielce; Attendance: 95; Referees: Reyes, Zúñiga (CUB)
13 August 2018; 16:00	2× (yellow card) 4× (suspension)	Report	1× (yellow card) 1× (suspension)	Legionów Hall, Kielce; Attendance: 95; Referees: Reyes, Zúñiga (CUB)

13 August 2018; 18:00	Poland	27–24	Austria	Legionów Hall, Kielce; Attendance: 1,450; Referees: Bennani, Bennani (SWE)
13 August 2018; 18:00	Więckowska 8	(13–15)	Neidhart 9	Legionów Hall, Kielce; Attendance: 1,450; Referees: Bennani, Bennani (SWE)
13 August 2018; 18:00	3× (yellow card) 6× (suspension)	Report	2× (yellow card) 4× (suspension)	Legionów Hall, Kielce; Attendance: 1,450; Referees: Bennani, Bennani (SWE)

13 August 2018; 20:00	Germany	17–20	Romania	Legionów Hall, Kielce; Attendance: 400; Referees: Covalciuc, Covalciuc (MDA)
13 August 2018; 20:00	Mühlner 5	(8–11)	Târșoagă 6	Legionów Hall, Kielce; Attendance: 400; Referees: Covalciuc, Covalciuc (MDA)
13 August 2018; 20:00	3× (yellow card) 1× (suspension)	Report	2× (yellow card) 1× (suspension)	Legionów Hall, Kielce; Attendance: 400; Referees: Covalciuc, Covalciuc (MDA)

=== Group B ===
Pos	Team	Pld	W	D	L	GF	GA	GD	Pts	Qualification
1	Hungary	5	5	0	0	162	107	+55	10	Eightfinals
2	Denmark	5	4	0	1	137	103	+34	8	Eightfinals
3	Croatia	5	3	0	2	118	117	+1	6	Eightfinals
4	Sweden	5	2	0	3	124	127	−3	4	Eightfinals
5	Chile	5	1	0	4	91	134	−43	2	
6	Egypt	5	0	0	5	98	142	−44	0	

Source: IHF
Rules for classification: 1) Points; 2) Head-to-head points; 3) Head-to-head goal difference; 4) Head-to-head goals scored; 5) Goal difference; 6) Goals scored; 7) Draw.

7 August 2018; 14:00	Denmark	28–21	Croatia	Legionów Hall, Kielce; Attendance: 250; Referees: Covalciuc, Covalciuc (MDA)
7 August 2018; 14:00	Faartoft 7	(18–13)	Kaselj 4	Legionów Hall, Kielce; Attendance: 250; Referees: Covalciuc, Covalciuc (MDA)
7 August 2018; 14:00	2× (yellow card) 2× (suspension)	Report	2× (yellow card) 8× (suspension) 1× (red card)	Legionów Hall, Kielce; Attendance: 250; Referees: Covalciuc, Covalciuc (MDA)

7 August 2018; 16:00	Hungary	29–24	Sweden	Legionów Hall, Kielce; Attendance: 500; Referees: Leszczyński, Piechota (POL)
7 August 2018; 16:00	Pál 8	(15–12)	Dano 4	Legionów Hall, Kielce; Attendance: 500; Referees: Leszczyński, Piechota (POL)
7 August 2018; 16:00	2× (yellow card) 3× (suspension)	Report	4× (yellow card) 4× (suspension)	Legionów Hall, Kielce; Attendance: 500; Referees: Leszczyński, Piechota (POL)

7 August 2018; 20:30	Egypt	12–23	Chile	Legionów Hall, Kielce; Attendance: 180; Referees: Lee, Lee (KOR)
7 August 2018; 20:30	Hany 4	(6–10)	Sepúlveda 6	Legionów Hall, Kielce; Attendance: 180; Referees: Lee, Lee (KOR)
7 August 2018; 20:30	2× (yellow card) 7× (suspension)	Report	1× (yellow card) 2× (suspension)	Legionów Hall, Kielce; Attendance: 180; Referees: Lee, Lee (KOR)

8 August 2018; 16:00	Sweden	23–32	Denmark	Legionów Hall, Kielce; Attendance: 220; Referees: Gasmi, Gasmi (FRA)
8 August 2018; 16:00	Dano 8	(12–16)	Møller 7	Legionów Hall, Kielce; Attendance: 220; Referees: Gasmi, Gasmi (FRA)
8 August 2018; 16:00	1× (yellow card) 3× (suspension)	Report	3× (yellow card) 1× (suspension)	Legionów Hall, Kielce; Attendance: 220; Referees: Gasmi, Gasmi (FRA)

8 August 2018; 18:00	Chile	13–42	Hungary	Legionów Hall, Kielce; Attendance: 150; Referees: Al-Zayyat, Eial (JOR)
8 August 2018; 18:00	Araya, Rebolledo 4	(6–20)	Pál 7	Legionów Hall, Kielce; Attendance: 150; Referees: Al-Zayyat, Eial (JOR)
8 August 2018; 18:00	1× (yellow card) 2× (suspension)	Report	1× (yellow card) 4× (suspension)	Legionów Hall, Kielce; Attendance: 150; Referees: Al-Zayyat, Eial (JOR)

8 August 2018; 20:00	Croatia	31–24	Egypt	Legionów Hall, Kielce; Attendance: 100; Referees: Al-Wattani, Qamber (BHR)
8 August 2018; 20:00	Malec 6	(15–11)	Mamdou 7	Legionów Hall, Kielce; Attendance: 100; Referees: Al-Wattani, Qamber (BHR)
8 August 2018; 20:00	4× (yellow card) 6× (suspension)	Report	2× (yellow card) 2× (suspension)	Legionów Hall, Kielce; Attendance: 100; Referees: Al-Wattani, Qamber (BHR)

10 August 2018; 10:00	Hungary	27–21	Croatia	Legionów Hall, Kielce; Attendance: 105; Referees: Covalciuc, Covalciuc (MDA)
10 August 2018; 10:00	Schatzl 7	(13–9)	Barišić 5	Legionów Hall, Kielce; Attendance: 105; Referees: Covalciuc, Covalciuc (MDA)
10 August 2018; 10:00	3× (yellow card) 3× (suspension)	Report	3× (yellow card) 4× (suspension)	Legionów Hall, Kielce; Attendance: 105; Referees: Covalciuc, Covalciuc (MDA)

10 August 2018; 12:00	Denmark	24–15	Egypt	Legionów Hall, Kielce; Referees: Diop, Faye (SEN)
10 August 2018; 12:00	Møller, Aagot 4	(11–10)	Mohamed 6	Legionów Hall, Kielce; Referees: Diop, Faye (SEN)
10 August 2018; 12:00	1× (yellow card) 5× (suspension)	Report	1× (yellow card) 7× (suspension)	Legionów Hall, Kielce; Referees: Diop, Faye (SEN)

10 August 2018; 14:00	Sweden	31–19	Chile	Legionów Hall, Kielce; Attendance: 100; Referees: Sá, Sá (POR)
10 August 2018; 14:00	Andersson 9	(17–13)	Pacheco 5	Legionów Hall, Kielce; Attendance: 100; Referees: Sá, Sá (POR)
10 August 2018; 14:00	2× (yellow card) 2× (suspension)	Report	1× (yellow card) 3× (suspension)	Legionów Hall, Kielce; Attendance: 100; Referees: Sá, Sá (POR)

11 August 2018; 16:00	Denmark	28–16	Chile	Legionów Hall, Kielce; Attendance: 110; Referees: Doychinov, Goretsov (BUL)
11 August 2018; 16:00	Wierzba 5	(12–8)	Araya 4	Legionów Hall, Kielce; Attendance: 110; Referees: Doychinov, Goretsov (BUL)
11 August 2018; 16:00	2× (yellow card) 7× (suspension) 1× (red card)	Report	4× (suspension)	Legionów Hall, Kielce; Attendance: 110; Referees: Doychinov, Goretsov (BUL)

11 August 2018; 18:00	Egypt	24–36	Hungary	Legionów Hall, Kielce; Attendance: 76; Referees: Ota, Shimajiri (JPN)
11 August 2018; 18:00	Haitham, Mamdou 4	(8–21)	Bánfai 8	Legionów Hall, Kielce; Attendance: 76; Referees: Ota, Shimajiri (JPN)
11 August 2018; 18:00	2× (yellow card) 3× (suspension)	Report	1× (yellow card)	Legionów Hall, Kielce; Attendance: 76; Referees: Ota, Shimajiri (JPN)

11 August 2018; 20:00	Croatia	24–18	Sweden	Legionów Hall, Kielce; Attendance: 151; Referees: Alpaidze, Berezkina (RUS)
11 August 2018; 20:00	Malec 7	(9–10)	Andersson 5	Legionów Hall, Kielce; Attendance: 151; Referees: Alpaidze, Berezkina (RUS)
11 August 2018; 20:00	2× (yellow card) 4× (suspension)	Report	1× (yellow card) 6× (suspension) 1× (red card)	Legionów Hall, Kielce; Attendance: 151; Referees: Alpaidze, Berezkina (RUS)

13 August 2018; 10:00	Chile	20–21	Croatia	Legionów Hall, Kielce; Attendance: 100; Referees: Sá, Sá (POR)
13 August 2018; 10:00	Álvarez 7	(11–11)	Miholić 5	Legionów Hall, Kielce; Attendance: 100; Referees: Sá, Sá (POR)
13 August 2018; 10:00	2× (yellow card) 3× (suspension)	Report	1× (yellow card) 5× (suspension)	Legionów Hall, Kielce; Attendance: 100; Referees: Sá, Sá (POR)

13 August 2018; 12:00	Egypt	23–28	Sweden	Legionów Hall, Kielce; Attendance: 100; Referees: Al-Wattani, Qamber (BHR)
13 August 2018; 12:00	Mohamed 8	(13–14)	Dano 9	Legionów Hall, Kielce; Attendance: 100; Referees: Al-Wattani, Qamber (BHR)
13 August 2018; 12:00	3× (yellow card) 8× (suspension) 1× (red card)	Report	2× (yellow card) 4× (suspension)	Legionów Hall, Kielce; Attendance: 100; Referees: Al-Wattani, Qamber (BHR)

13 August 2018; 14:00	Hungary	28–25	Denmark	Legionów Hall, Kielce; Attendance: 120; Referees: Leszczyński, Piechota (POL)
13 August 2018; 14:00	Pál 7	(14–14)	Møller 5	Legionów Hall, Kielce; Attendance: 120; Referees: Leszczyński, Piechota (POL)
13 August 2018; 14:00	2× (yellow card) 1× (suspension)	Report	3× (yellow card) 1× (suspension)	Legionów Hall, Kielce; Attendance: 120; Referees: Leszczyński, Piechota (POL)

=== Group C ===
Pos	Team	Pld	W	D	L	GF	GA	GD	Pts	Qualification
1	Russia	5	5	0	0	170	103	+67	10	Eightfinals
2	Norway	5	4	0	1	165	119	+46	8	Eightfinals
3	Netherlands	5	3	0	2	150	142	+8	6	Eightfinals
4	Japan	5	2	0	3	122	136	−14	4	Eightfinals
5	Argentina	5	1	0	4	93	164	−71	2	
6	China	5	0	0	5	115	152	−37	0	

Source: IHF
Rules for classification: 1) Points; 2) Head-to-head points; 3) Head-to-head goal difference; 4) Head-to-head goals scored; 5) Goal difference; 6) Goals scored; 7) Draw.

7 August 2018; 10:00	Norway	36–25	China	Kielce University of Technology, Kielce; Attendance: 100; Referees: Diop, Faye (SEN)
7 August 2018; 10:00	Novak 6	(22–14)	Zhu H. 6	Kielce University of Technology, Kielce; Attendance: 100; Referees: Diop, Faye (SEN)
7 August 2018; 10:00	1× (yellow card) 1× (suspension)	Report	1× (yellow card) 5× (suspension)	Kielce University of Technology, Kielce; Attendance: 100; Referees: Diop, Faye (SEN)

7 August 2018; 12:00	Russia	43–14	Argentina	Kielce University of Technology, Kielce; Attendance: 150; Referees: Al_Wattani, Qamber (BHR)
7 August 2018; 12:00	Levchina 6	(17–8)	Bono 4	Kielce University of Technology, Kielce; Attendance: 150; Referees: Al_Wattani, Qamber (BHR)
7 August 2018; 12:00	2× (yellow card) 3× (suspension)	Report	2× (yellow card) 2× (suspension)	Kielce University of Technology, Kielce; Attendance: 150; Referees: Al_Wattani, Qamber (BHR)

7 August 2018; 14:00	Japan	30–33	Netherlands	Kielce University of Technology, Kielce; Attendance: 145; Referees: Reyes, Zúñiga (CUB)
7 August 2018; 14:00	Okada 13	(14–16)	Krullaars 9	Kielce University of Technology, Kielce; Attendance: 145; Referees: Reyes, Zúñiga (CUB)
7 August 2018; 14:00	2× (yellow card) 4× (suspension)	Report	2× (yellow card) 3× (suspension)	Kielce University of Technology, Kielce; Attendance: 145; Referees: Reyes, Zúñiga (CUB)

9 August 2018; 16:00	China	17–32	Russia	Kielce University of Technology, Kielce; Attendance: 65; Referees: Sá, Sá (POR)
9 August 2018; 16:00	Zhou 6	(11–16)	Sinelnikova 6	Kielce University of Technology, Kielce; Attendance: 65; Referees: Sá, Sá (POR)
9 August 2018; 16:00	3× (suspension)	Report	1× (suspension)	Kielce University of Technology, Kielce; Attendance: 65; Referees: Sá, Sá (POR)

9 August 2018; 18:00	Netherlands	25–34	Norway	Kielce University of Technology, Kielce; Attendance: 180; Referees: Leszczyński, Piechota (POL)
9 August 2018; 18:00	Van der Vliet 10	(13–19)	Figenschau 8	Kielce University of Technology, Kielce; Attendance: 180; Referees: Leszczyński, Piechota (POL)
9 August 2018; 18:00	2× (yellow card) 4× (suspension)	Report	2× (yellow card) 7× (suspension)	Kielce University of Technology, Kielce; Attendance: 180; Referees: Leszczyński, Piechota (POL)

9 August 2018; 20:00	Argentina	23–26	Japan	Kielce University of Technology, Kielce; Attendance: 55; Referees: Bennani, Bennani (SWE)
9 August 2018; 20:00	Bono 10	(10–14)	Ito 8	Kielce University of Technology, Kielce; Attendance: 55; Referees: Bennani, Bennani (SWE)
9 August 2018; 20:00	3× (yellow card) 8× (suspension)	Report	1× (yellow card) 3× (suspension)	Kielce University of Technology, Kielce; Attendance: 55; Referees: Bennani, Bennani (SWE)

10 August 2018; 16:00	Norway	39–12	Argentina	Kielce University of Technology, Kielce; Attendance: 87; Referees: El-Saied, El-Saied (EGY)
10 August 2018; 16:00	Høve 8	(20–6)	Cavo 4	Kielce University of Technology, Kielce; Attendance: 87; Referees: El-Saied, El-Saied (EGY)
10 August 2018; 16:00	1× (yellow card) 4× (suspension)	Report	4× (suspension)	Kielce University of Technology, Kielce; Attendance: 87; Referees: El-Saied, El-Saied (EGY)

10 August 2018; 18:00	Russia	31–27	Japan	Kielce University of Technology, Kielce; Attendance: 50; Referees: Bolic, Hurich (AUT)
10 August 2018; 18:00	Skivko 6	(17–8)	Ito 5	Kielce University of Technology, Kielce; Attendance: 50; Referees: Bolic, Hurich (AUT)
10 August 2018; 18:00	1× (yellow card) 2× (suspension)	Report	1× (yellow card) 6× (suspension)	Kielce University of Technology, Kielce; Attendance: 50; Referees: Bolic, Hurich (AUT)

10 August 2018; 20:00	China	30–32	Netherlands	Kielce University of Technology, Kielce; Attendance: 225; Referees: Al-Wattani, Qamber (BHR)
10 August 2018; 20:00	Zhou 10	(16–18)	Sprengers 12	Kielce University of Technology, Kielce; Attendance: 225; Referees: Al-Wattani, Qamber (BHR)
10 August 2018; 20:00	1× (yellow card) 4× (suspension)	Report	3× (yellow card) 2× (suspension)	Kielce University of Technology, Kielce; Attendance: 225; Referees: Al-Wattani, Qamber (BHR)

12 August 2018; 16:00	Russia	30–27	Netherlands	Kielce University of Technology, Kielce; Attendance: 150; Referees: Covalciuc, Covalciuc (MDA)
12 August 2018; 16:00	Maslova 9	(16–12)	Krullaars 8	Kielce University of Technology, Kielce; Attendance: 150; Referees: Covalciuc, Covalciuc (MDA)
12 August 2018; 16:00	2× (yellow card) 4× (suspension)	Report	3× (yellow card) 1× (suspension)	Kielce University of Technology, Kielce; Attendance: 150; Referees: Covalciuc, Covalciuc (MDA)

12 August 2018; 18:00	Japan	23–29	Norway	Kielce University of Technology, Kielce; Attendance: 82; Referees: Al-Wattani, Qamber (BHR)
12 August 2018; 18:00	Ito 5	(13–14)	L. Deila 5	Kielce University of Technology, Kielce; Attendance: 82; Referees: Al-Wattani, Qamber (BHR)
12 August 2018; 18:00	1× (yellow card)	Report	3× (yellow card) 2× (suspension)	Kielce University of Technology, Kielce; Attendance: 82; Referees: Al-Wattani, Qamber (BHR)

12 August 2018; 20:00	Argentina	26–23	China	Kielce University of Technology, Kielce; Referees: Bolic, Hurich (AUT)
12 August 2018; 20:00	Bono 8	(11–11)	Zhou 11	Kielce University of Technology, Kielce; Referees: Bolic, Hurich (AUT)
12 August 2018; 20:00	1× (yellow card) 4× (suspension)	Report	2× (yellow card) 7× (suspension)	Kielce University of Technology, Kielce; Referees: Bolic, Hurich (AUT)

13 August 2018; 16:00	Netherlands	33–18	Argentina	Kielce University of Technology, Kielce; Attendance: 77; Referees: Ota, Shimajiri (JPN)
13 August 2018; 16:00	Van der Vliet 8	(17–11)	Bono 6	Kielce University of Technology, Kielce; Attendance: 77; Referees: Ota, Shimajiri (JPN)
13 August 2018; 16:00	1× (yellow card) 2× (suspension)	Report	4× (suspension)	Kielce University of Technology, Kielce; Attendance: 77; Referees: Ota, Shimajiri (JPN)

13 August 2018; 18:00	Japan	26–20	China	Kielce University of Technology, Kielce; Attendance: 100; Referees: El-Saied, El-Saied (EGY)
13 August 2018; 18:00	Okada 6	(14–9)	Zhou 7	Kielce University of Technology, Kielce; Attendance: 100; Referees: El-Saied, El-Saied (EGY)
13 August 2018; 18:00	1× (yellow card) 1× (suspension)	Report	1× (yellow card) 1× (suspension)	Kielce University of Technology, Kielce; Attendance: 100; Referees: El-Saied, El-Saied (EGY)

13 August 2018; 20:00	Norway	28–34	Russia	Kielce University of Technology, Kielce; Referees: Gasmi, Gasmi (FRA)
13 August 2018; 20:00	Novak 6	(13–20)	Maslova, Mikhaylichenko 6	Kielce University of Technology, Kielce; Referees: Gasmi, Gasmi (FRA)
13 August 2018; 20:00	3× (suspension) 1× (red card)	Report	3× (suspension)	Kielce University of Technology, Kielce; Referees: Gasmi, Gasmi (FRA)

=== Group D ===
Pos	Team	Pld	W	D	L	GF	GA	GD	Pts	Qualification
1	South Korea	5	5	0	0	198	145	+53	10	Eightfinals
2	France	5	4	0	1	157	115	+42	8	Eightfinals
3	Spain	5	2	1	2	142	122	+20	5	Eightfinals
4	Tunisia	5	2	0	3	128	154	−26	4	Eightfinals
5	Montenegro	5	1	1	3	114	130	−16	3	
6	Kazakhstan	5	0	0	5	112	185	−73	0	

Source: IHF
Rules for classification: 1) Points; 2) Head-to-head points; 3) Head-to-head goal difference; 4) Head-to-head goals scored; 5) Goal difference; 6) Goals scored; 7) Draw.

7 August 2018; 16:00	South Korea	45–27	Tunisia	Kielce University of Technology, Kielce; Attendance: 85; Referees: Burgos, Delgado (ARG)
7 August 2018; 16:00	Kim S. 12	(27–11)	Aouij 13	Kielce University of Technology, Kielce; Attendance: 85; Referees: Burgos, Delgado (ARG)
7 August 2018; 16:00	2× (yellow card) 7× (suspension) 1× (red card)	Report	3× (suspension)	Kielce University of Technology, Kielce; Attendance: 85; Referees: Burgos, Delgado (ARG)

7 August 2018; 18:00	France	20–16	Montenegro	Kielce University of Technology, Kielce; Attendance: 100; Referees: Doychinov, Goretsov (BUL)
7 August 2018; 18:00	Peillon 5	(9–6)	Božović 5	Kielce University of Technology, Kielce; Attendance: 100; Referees: Doychinov, Goretsov (BUL)
7 August 2018; 18:00	1× (yellow card) 4× (suspension)	Report	3× (yellow card) 3× (suspension)	Kielce University of Technology, Kielce; Attendance: 100; Referees: Doychinov, Goretsov (BUL)

7 August 2018; 20:00	Spain	39–21	Kazakhstan	Kielce University of Technology, Kielce; Attendance: 150; Referees: El-Saied, El-Saied (EGY)
7 August 2018; 20:00	Loidi 7	(16–10)	Zhaparova 5	Kielce University of Technology, Kielce; Attendance: 150; Referees: El-Saied, El-Saied (EGY)
7 August 2018; 20:00	2× (yellow card) 2× (suspension)	Report	5× (suspension)	Kielce University of Technology, Kielce; Attendance: 150; Referees: El-Saied, El-Saied (EGY)

8 August 2018; 16:00	Tunisia	12–27	France	Kielce University of Technology, Kielce; Attendance: 75; Referees: Bennani, Bennani (SWE)
8 August 2018; 16:00	Aouij 9	(6–15)	Peillon 4	Kielce University of Technology, Kielce; Attendance: 75; Referees: Bennani, Bennani (SWE)
8 August 2018; 16:00	2× (yellow card) 2× (suspension)	Report	3× (yellow card) 2× (suspension)	Kielce University of Technology, Kielce; Attendance: 75; Referees: Bennani, Bennani (SWE)

8 August 2018; 18:00	Kazakhstan	24–39	South Korea	Kielce University of Technology, Kielce; Attendance: 150; Referees: Sá, Sá (POR)
8 August 2018; 18:00	Stepanova 11	(6–20)	Woo, Yun 6	Kielce University of Technology, Kielce; Attendance: 150; Referees: Sá, Sá (POR)
8 August 2018; 18:00	1× (yellow card) 3× (suspension)	Report	2× (yellow card) 6× (suspension)	Kielce University of Technology, Kielce; Attendance: 150; Referees: Sá, Sá (POR)

8 August 2018; 20:00	Montenegro	18–18	Spain	Kielce University of Technology, Kielce; Attendance: 200; Referees: Bolic, Hurich (AUT)
8 August 2018; 20:00	Vukčević 5	(10–7)	Sobrepera 6	Kielce University of Technology, Kielce; Attendance: 200; Referees: Bolic, Hurich (AUT)
8 August 2018; 20:00	3× (yellow card) 7× (suspension) 1× (red card)	Report	1× (yellow card) 3× (suspension)	Kielce University of Technology, Kielce; Attendance: 200; Referees: Bolic, Hurich (AUT)

10 August 2018; 10:00	South Korea	37–24	Montenegro	Kielce University of Technology, Kielce; Attendance: 150; Referees: Bennani, Bennani (SWE)
10 August 2018; 10:00	Woo 8	(20–10)	three players 5	Kielce University of Technology, Kielce; Attendance: 150; Referees: Bennani, Bennani (SWE)
10 August 2018; 10:00	2× (yellow card) 4× (suspension)	Report	2× (yellow card) 9× (suspension)	Kielce University of Technology, Kielce; Attendance: 150; Referees: Bennani, Bennani (SWE)

10 August 2018; 12:00	France	29–25	Spain	Kielce University of Technology, Kielce; Attendance: 150; Referees: Reyes, Zúñiga (CUB)
10 August 2018; 12:00	Foppa 7	(15–11)	Sobrepera 7	Kielce University of Technology, Kielce; Attendance: 150; Referees: Reyes, Zúñiga (CUB)
10 August 2018; 12:00	1× (yellow card) 5× (suspension)	Report	1× (yellow card) 2× (suspension)	Kielce University of Technology, Kielce; Attendance: 150; Referees: Reyes, Zúñiga (CUB)

10 August 2018; 14:00	Tunisia	36–26	Kazakhstan	Kielce University of Technology, Kielce; Attendance: 100; Referees: Ota, Shimajiri (JPN)
10 August 2018; 14:00	Aouij 10	(20–11)	Zhaparova 6	Kielce University of Technology, Kielce; Attendance: 100; Referees: Ota, Shimajiri (JPN)
10 August 2018; 14:00	1× (yellow card) 5× (suspension)	Report	4× (suspension)	Kielce University of Technology, Kielce; Attendance: 100; Referees: Ota, Shimajiri (JPN)

11 August 2018; 16:00	France	42–17	Kazakhstan	Kielce University of Technology, Kielce; Attendance: 100; Referees: Al-Zayyat, Eial (JOR)
11 August 2018; 16:00	Pora 8	(20–9)	Zhaparova 5	Kielce University of Technology, Kielce; Attendance: 100; Referees: Al-Zayyat, Eial (JOR)
11 August 2018; 16:00	3× (yellow card) 1× (suspension)	Report	1× (yellow card) 3× (suspension)	Kielce University of Technology, Kielce; Attendance: 100; Referees: Al-Zayyat, Eial (JOR)

11 August 2018; 18:00	Spain	31–32	South Korea	Kielce University of Technology, Kielce; Attendance: 300; Referees: Leszczyński, Piechota (POL)
11 August 2018; 18:00	Sobrepera 6	(15–15)	Kim S., Yun 8	Kielce University of Technology, Kielce; Attendance: 300; Referees: Leszczyński, Piechota (POL)
11 August 2018; 18:00	2× (yellow card) 2× (suspension)	Report	2× (yellow card) 4× (suspension)	Kielce University of Technology, Kielce; Attendance: 300; Referees: Leszczyński, Piechota (POL)

11 August 2018; 20:00	Montenegro	27–31	Tunisia	Kielce University of Technology, Kielce; Attendance: 200; Referees: Reyes, Zúñiga (CUB)
11 August 2018; 20:00	Božović, Raičević 6	(12–13)	Aouij 10	Kielce University of Technology, Kielce; Attendance: 200; Referees: Reyes, Zúñiga (CUB)
11 August 2018; 20:00	1× (yellow card) 7× (suspension)	Report	2× (yellow card) 3× (suspension)	Kielce University of Technology, Kielce; Attendance: 200; Referees: Reyes, Zúñiga (CUB)

13 August 2018; 10:00	Kazakhstan	24–29	Montenegro	Kielce University of Technology, Kielce; Attendance: 67; Referees: Diop, Faye (SEN)
13 August 2018; 10:00	Stepanova 8	(12–16)	Raičević 8	Kielce University of Technology, Kielce; Attendance: 67; Referees: Diop, Faye (SEN)
13 August 2018; 10:00		Report	2× (yellow card) 2× (suspension)	Kielce University of Technology, Kielce; Attendance: 67; Referees: Diop, Faye (SEN)

13 August 2018; 12:00	Spain	29–22	Tunisia	Kielce University of Technology, Kielce; Attendance: 84; Referees: Burgos, Delgado (ARG)
13 August 2018; 12:00	three players 4	(17–10)	Zalfani 9	Kielce University of Technology, Kielce; Attendance: 84; Referees: Burgos, Delgado (ARG)
13 August 2018; 12:00	1× (yellow card) 4× (suspension)	Report	4× (suspension)	Kielce University of Technology, Kielce; Attendance: 84; Referees: Burgos, Delgado (ARG)

13 August 2018; 14:00	South Korea	45–39	France	Kielce University of Technology, Kielce; Referees: Alpaidze, Berezkina (RUS)
13 August 2018; 14:00	Woo 12	(22–21)	Foppa 9	Kielce University of Technology, Kielce; Referees: Alpaidze, Berezkina (RUS)
13 August 2018; 14:00	1× (yellow card) 5× (suspension)	Report	2× (yellow card) 2× (suspension)	Kielce University of Technology, Kielce; Referees: Alpaidze, Berezkina (RUS)

== President's Cup ==
=== 21st place bracket ===
21st–24th place semifinals
15 August
Angola	26
Egypt	17
15 August
China	27
Kazakhstan	25

21st place
16 August
Angola	22
China	18
23rd place
16 August
Egypt	31
Kazakhstan	25

==== 21st–24th place semifinals ====
15 August 2018; 09:30	Angola	26–17	Egypt	Legionów Hall, Kielce; Attendance: 20; Referees: Bolic, Hurich (AUT)
15 August 2018; 09:30	Masseu 10	(12–10)	Abdelrazek, Tarek 3	Legionów Hall, Kielce; Attendance: 20; Referees: Bolic, Hurich (AUT)
15 August 2018; 09:30	4× (suspension)	Report	1× (yellow card) 3× (suspension)	Legionów Hall, Kielce; Attendance: 20; Referees: Bolic, Hurich (AUT)

15 August 2018; 09:30	China	27–25	Kazakhstan	Kielce University of Technology, Kielce; Attendance: 50; Referees: Sá, Sá (POR)
15 August 2018; 09:30	Zhou 12	(15–10)	Syzdykova 7	Kielce University of Technology, Kielce; Attendance: 50; Referees: Sá, Sá (POR)
15 August 2018; 09:30	2× (yellow card) 3× (suspension)	Report	1× (yellow card) 3× (suspension)	Kielce University of Technology, Kielce; Attendance: 50; Referees: Sá, Sá (POR)

==== 23rd place game ====
16 August 2018; 09:30	Egypt	31–25	Kazakhstan	Kielce University of Technology, Kielce; Attendance: 50; Referees: Covalciuc, Covalciuc (MDA)
16 August 2018; 09:30	Mohamed 9	(15–13)	Stepanova 9	Kielce University of Technology, Kielce; Attendance: 50; Referees: Covalciuc, Covalciuc (MDA)
16 August 2018; 09:30	3× (yellow card) 4× (suspension)	Report	2× (yellow card) 4× (suspension)	Kielce University of Technology, Kielce; Attendance: 50; Referees: Covalciuc, Covalciuc (MDA)

==== 21st place game ====
16 August 2018; 11:45	Angola	22–18	China	Kielce University of Technology, Kielce; Attendance: 50; Referees: Leszczyński, Piechota (POL)
16 August 2018; 11:45	Kiala 8	(13–7)	Zhou, Zhu H. 5	Kielce University of Technology, Kielce; Attendance: 50; Referees: Leszczyński, Piechota (POL)
16 August 2018; 11:45	2× (yellow card) 3× (suspension)	Report	2× (yellow card) 4× (suspension)	Kielce University of Technology, Kielce; Attendance: 50; Referees: Leszczyński, Piechota (POL)

=== 17th place bracket ===
17–20th place semifinals
15 August
Slovakia	23
Chile	29
15 August
Argentina	15
Montenegro	25

17th place
16 August
Chile	16
Montenegro	30
19th place
16 August
Slovakia (p)	24 (5)
Argentina	24 (4)

==== 17th–20th place semifinals ====
15 August 2018; 11:45	Slovakia	23–29	Chile	Legionów Hall, Kielce; Attendance: 45; Referees: Al-Wattani, Qamber (BHR)
15 August 2018; 11:45	Mészáros 7	(11–13)	Sepúlveda 11	Legionów Hall, Kielce; Attendance: 45; Referees: Al-Wattani, Qamber (BHR)
15 August 2018; 11:45	2× (yellow card) 3× (suspension)	Report	2× (yellow card) 3× (suspension)	Legionów Hall, Kielce; Attendance: 45; Referees: Al-Wattani, Qamber (BHR)

15 August 2018; 11:45	Argentina	15–25	Montenegro	Kielce University of Technology, Kielce; Attendance: 130; Referees: Doychinov, Goretsov (BUL)
15 August 2018; 11:45	Bono 5	(8–10)	three players 5	Kielce University of Technology, Kielce; Attendance: 130; Referees: Doychinov, Goretsov (BUL)
15 August 2018; 11:45	1× (suspension)	Report	2× (yellow card) 6× (suspension)	Kielce University of Technology, Kielce; Attendance: 130; Referees: Doychinov, Goretsov (BUL)

==== 19th place game ====
16 August 2018
09:30
Slovakia
24–24
Argentina
Legionów Hall, Kielce
Attendance: 100
Referees: Al-Zayyat, Eial (JOR)
Mészáros, Trepáčová 7
(11–8)
Bono, Cavo 7
2× (yellow card) 5× (suspension)
Report
2× (yellow card) 5× (suspension) 1× (red card)

FT: 24–22 Pen: 5–4

==== 17th place game ====
16 August 2018; 11:45	Chile	16–30	Montenegro	Legionów Hall, Kielce; Attendance: 100; Referees: Bennani, Bennani (SWE)
16 August 2018; 11:45	Ramírez, Rebolledo 4	(7–15)	Raičević 6	Legionów Hall, Kielce; Attendance: 100; Referees: Bennani, Bennani (SWE)
16 August 2018; 11:45	1× (yellow card) 2× (suspension)	Report	2× (yellow card) 1× (suspension)	Legionów Hall, Kielce; Attendance: 100; Referees: Bennani, Bennani (SWE)

== 9–16th placement games ==
The eight losers of the round of 16 will be seeded according to their results in the preliminary round against teams ranked 1–4.

=== Ranking ===
Pos	Team	Pld	W	D	L	GF	GA	GD	Pts
1	Romania	3	3	0	0	85	55	+30	6
2	France	3	2	0	1	95	82	+13	4
3	Norway	3	1	0	2	85	83	+2	2
4	Croatia	3	1	0	2	66	73	−7	2
5	Poland	3	1	0	2	71	82	−11	2
6	Japan	3	0	0	3	70	93	−23	0
7	Austria	3	0	0	3	60	90	−30	0
8	Tunisia	3	0	0	3	61	101	−40	0

Source: IHF
Rules for classification: 1) points; 2) goal difference; 3) goals scored.

=== 15th place game ===
16 August 2018; 14:00	Austria	32–25	Tunisia	Kielce University of Technology, Kielce; Attendance: 74; Referees: Diop, Faye (SEN)
16 August 2018; 14:00	Neidhart 8	(19–12)	Aouij 8	Kielce University of Technology, Kielce; Attendance: 74; Referees: Diop, Faye (SEN)
16 August 2018; 14:00	1× (yellow card) 4× (suspension)	Report	1× (yellow card) 5× (suspension)	Kielce University of Technology, Kielce; Attendance: 74; Referees: Diop, Faye (SEN)

=== 13th place game ===
16 August 2018; 16:15	Poland	22–19	Japan	Legionów Hall, Kielce; Attendance: 500; Referees: Doychinov, Goretsov (BUL)
16 August 2018; 16:15	Sobecka 10	(12–10)	Abe, Okada 6	Legionów Hall, Kielce; Attendance: 500; Referees: Doychinov, Goretsov (BUL)
16 August 2018; 16:15	1× (yellow card) 6× (suspension)	Report	2× (yellow card)	Legionów Hall, Kielce; Attendance: 500; Referees: Doychinov, Goretsov (BUL)

=== Eleventh place game ===
16 August 2018; 14:00	Norway	27–20	Croatia	Legionów Hall, Kielce; Attendance: 110; Referees: Ota, Shimajiri (JPN)
16 August 2018; 14:00	Moen 5	(13–8)	Petika 5	Legionów Hall, Kielce; Attendance: 110; Referees: Ota, Shimajiri (JPN)
16 August 2018; 14:00	1× (yellow card) 3× (suspension)	Report	1× (suspension)	Legionów Hall, Kielce; Attendance: 110; Referees: Ota, Shimajiri (JPN)

=== Ninth place game ===
16 August 2018
16:15
Romania
26–26
France
Kielce University of Technology, Kielce
Attendance: 77
Referees: Bolic, Hurich (AUT)
Popa 9
(15–15)
Leblevec 7
1× (yellow card) 4× (suspension)
Report
2× (yellow card) 6× (suspension)

FT: 26–26 Pen: 4–3

== Knockout stage ==
=== Bracket ===
Round of 16
15 August
Hungary	36
Austria	22
15 August
Spain	20
Norway	18
15 August
Croatia	24
Germany	25
15 August
South Korea	36
Japan	30
15 August
Netherlands	24
France	23
15 August
Romania	20
Sweden	22
15 August
Poland	20
Denmark	30
15 August
Russia	36
Tunisia	16

Quarterfinals
16 August
Hungary	33
Spain	20
16 August
Germany	29
South Korea	30
16 August
Netherlands	17
Sweden	27
16 August
Denmark	25
Russia	29

Semifinals
18 August
Hungary	34
South Korea	29
18 August
Sweden	23
Russia	29

Final
19 August
Hungary	27
Russia	29
Third place
19 August
South Korea	34
Sweden	27

5th place bracket

5th–8th place semifinals
18 August
Spain	20
Germany	24
18 August
Netherlands	27 (2)
Denmark (p)	27 (4)

Fifth place
19 August
Germany	25 (3)
Denmark	25 (0)
Seventh place
19 August
Spain	26
Netherlands	33

=== Round of 16 ===
15 August 2018; 14:00	Hungary	36–22	Austria	Legionów Hall, Kielce; Attendance: 103; Referees: El-Saied, El-Saied (EGY)
15 August 2018; 14:00	Kellermann 6	(16–11)	Schlegel 6	Legionów Hall, Kielce; Attendance: 103; Referees: El-Saied, El-Saied (EGY)
15 August 2018; 14:00	1× (yellow card) 3× (suspension)	Report	1× (yellow card) 3× (suspension)	Legionów Hall, Kielce; Attendance: 103; Referees: El-Saied, El-Saied (EGY)

15 August 2018; 14:00	Netherlands	24–23	France	Kielce University of Technology, Kielce; Attendance: 400; Referees: Burgos, Delgado (ARG)
15 August 2018; 14:00	Van der Vliet 8	(12–16)	Foppa, Peillon 5	Kielce University of Technology, Kielce; Attendance: 400; Referees: Burgos, Delgado (ARG)
15 August 2018; 14:00	2× (yellow card) 1× (suspension)	Report	3× (yellow card) 3× (suspension)	Kielce University of Technology, Kielce; Attendance: 400; Referees: Burgos, Delgado (ARG)

15 August 2018; 16:15	Romania	20–22	Sweden	Legionów Hall, Kielce; Attendance: 147; Referees: Alpaidze, Berezkina (RUS)
15 August 2018; 16:15	Cace 7	(15–10)	Andersson 8	Legionów Hall, Kielce; Attendance: 147; Referees: Alpaidze, Berezkina (RUS)
15 August 2018; 16:15	2× (yellow card) 3× (suspension)	Report	1× (yellow card) 3× (suspension)	Legionów Hall, Kielce; Attendance: 147; Referees: Alpaidze, Berezkina (RUS)

15 August 2018; 16:15	Spain	20–18	Norway	Kielce University of Technology, Kielce; Referees: Leszczyński, Piechota (POL)
15 August 2018; 16:15	Sobrepera 6	(7–9)	three players 3	Kielce University of Technology, Kielce; Referees: Leszczyński, Piechota (POL)
15 August 2018; 16:15	2× (yellow card) 4× (suspension)	Report	2× (yellow card) 5× (suspension)	Kielce University of Technology, Kielce; Referees: Leszczyński, Piechota (POL)

15 August 2018; 18:30	Poland	20–30	Denmark	Legionów Hall, Kielce; Attendance: 2,800; Referees: Covalciuc, Covalciuc (MDA)
15 August 2018; 18:30	Cygan 6	(9–12)	Steffensen 8	Legionów Hall, Kielce; Attendance: 2,800; Referees: Covalciuc, Covalciuc (MDA)
15 August 2018; 18:30	3× (yellow card) 4× (suspension)	Report	2× (yellow card) 3× (suspension)	Legionów Hall, Kielce; Attendance: 2,800; Referees: Covalciuc, Covalciuc (MDA)

15 August 2018; 18:30	South Korea	36–30	Japan	Kielce University of Technology, Kielce; Attendance: 100; Referees: Reyes, Zúñiga (CUB)
15 August 2018; 18:30	Park So-y. 10	(20–15)	Abe 7	Kielce University of Technology, Kielce; Attendance: 100; Referees: Reyes, Zúñiga (CUB)
15 August 2018; 18:30	1× (yellow card) 3× (suspension)	Report	2× (yellow card) 1× (suspension)	Kielce University of Technology, Kielce; Attendance: 100; Referees: Reyes, Zúñiga (CUB)

15 August 2018; 20:45	Croatia	24–25	Germany	Legionów Hall, Kielce; Attendance: 300; Referees: Gasmi, Gasmi (FRA)
15 August 2018; 20:45	Guskić 7	(14–9)	three players 5	Legionów Hall, Kielce; Attendance: 300; Referees: Gasmi, Gasmi (FRA)
15 August 2018; 20:45	1× (yellow card) 6× (suspension)	Report	2× (yellow card) 3× (suspension)	Legionów Hall, Kielce; Attendance: 300; Referees: Gasmi, Gasmi (FRA)

15 August 2018; 20:45	Russia	36–16	Tunisia	Kielce University of Technology, Kielce; Referees: Bennani, Bennani (SWE)
15 August 2018; 20:45	Levchina 6	(18–10)	Zalfani 6	Kielce University of Technology, Kielce; Referees: Bennani, Bennani (SWE)
15 August 2018; 20:45	6× (suspension)	Report	3× (yellow card) 8× (suspension) 1× (red card)	Kielce University of Technology, Kielce; Referees: Bennani, Bennani (SWE)

=== Quarterfinals ===
16 August 2018; 18:30	Hungary	33–20	Spain	Legionów Hall, Kielce; Attendance: 250; Referees: Burgos, Delgado (ARG)
16 August 2018; 18:30	Bánfai 7	(14–11)	Sobrepera 6	Legionów Hall, Kielce; Attendance: 250; Referees: Burgos, Delgado (ARG)
16 August 2018; 18:30	3× (suspension)	Report	2× (yellow card) 2× (suspension)	Legionów Hall, Kielce; Attendance: 250; Referees: Burgos, Delgado (ARG)

16 August 2018; 18:30	Netherlands	17–27	Sweden	Kielce University of Technology, Kielce; Attendance: 600; Referees: Reyes, Zúñiga (CUB)
16 August 2018; 18:30	Krullaars 5	(9–13)	Andersson 7	Kielce University of Technology, Kielce; Attendance: 600; Referees: Reyes, Zúñiga (CUB)
16 August 2018; 18:30	3× (yellow card) 2× (suspension)	Report	2× (yellow card) 5× (suspension)	Kielce University of Technology, Kielce; Attendance: 600; Referees: Reyes, Zúñiga (CUB)

16 August 2018; 20:45	Germany	29–30	South Korea	Legionów Hall, Kielce; Referees: Alpaidze, Berezkina (RUS)
16 August 2018; 20:45	Von Pereira 7	(13–15)	Woo 10	Legionów Hall, Kielce; Referees: Alpaidze, Berezkina (RUS)
16 August 2018; 20:45	2× (yellow card) 3× (suspension) 1× (red card)	Report	2× (yellow card) 4× (suspension)	Legionów Hall, Kielce; Referees: Alpaidze, Berezkina (RUS)

16 August 2018; 20:45	Denmark	25–29	Russia	Kielce University of Technology, Kielce; Attendance: 400; Referees: Gasmi, Gasmi (FRA)
16 August 2018; 20:45	Steffensen 7	(12–14)	Mukhina 6	Kielce University of Technology, Kielce; Attendance: 400; Referees: Gasmi, Gasmi (FRA)
16 August 2018; 20:45	4× (yellow card) 5× (suspension)	Report	4× (suspension)	Kielce University of Technology, Kielce; Attendance: 400; Referees: Gasmi, Gasmi (FRA)

=== 5–8th place semifinals ===
18 August 2018; 12:30	Spain	20–24	Germany	Legionów Hall, Kielce; Attendance: 200; Referees: Reyes, Zúñiga (CUB)
18 August 2018; 12:30	Sobrepera 7	(9–11)	Weise 7	Legionów Hall, Kielce; Attendance: 200; Referees: Reyes, Zúñiga (CUB)
18 August 2018; 12:30	2× (yellow card) 2× (suspension)	Report	3× (yellow card) 2× (suspension)	Legionów Hall, Kielce; Attendance: 200; Referees: Reyes, Zúñiga (CUB)

18 August 2018
15:00
Netherlands
27–27
Denmark
Legionów Hall, Kielce
Attendance: 250
Referees: Burgos, Delgado (ARG)
Van der Vliet 9
(10–10)
Steffensen 9
1× (yellow card) 1× (suspension)
Report
2× (yellow card) 3× (suspension)

FT: 27–27 Pen: 2–4

=== Semifinals ===
18 August 2018; 17:30	Hungary	34–29	South Korea	Legionów Hall, Kielce; Attendance: 500; Referees: Covalciuc, Covalciuc (MDA)
18 August 2018; 17:30	three players 6	(19–12)	Woo, Yun 6	Legionów Hall, Kielce; Attendance: 500; Referees: Covalciuc, Covalciuc (MDA)
18 August 2018; 17:30	3× (yellow card) 1× (suspension)	Report	1× (yellow card) 4× (suspension)	Legionów Hall, Kielce; Attendance: 500; Referees: Covalciuc, Covalciuc (MDA)

18 August 2018; 20:00	Sweden	23–29	Russia	Legionów Hall, Kielce; Attendance: 500; Referees: Leszczyński, Piechota (POL)
18 August 2018; 20:00	Andersson 7	(13–17)	Kirdiasheva 14	Legionów Hall, Kielce; Attendance: 500; Referees: Leszczyński, Piechota (POL)
18 August 2018; 20:00	3× (yellow card) 4× (suspension)	Report	2× (yellow card) 4× (suspension)	Legionów Hall, Kielce; Attendance: 500; Referees: Leszczyński, Piechota (POL)

=== Seventh place game ===
19 August 2018; 10:30	Spain	26–33	Netherlands	Legionów Hall, Kielce; Attendance: 100; Referees: El-Saied, El-Saied (EGY)
19 August 2018; 10:30	Moles 7	(14–14)	Van der Vliet 12	Legionów Hall, Kielce; Attendance: 100; Referees: El-Saied, El-Saied (EGY)
19 August 2018; 10:30	1× (yellow card) 2× (suspension)	Report	1× (yellow card) 4× (suspension)	Legionów Hall, Kielce; Attendance: 100; Referees: El-Saied, El-Saied (EGY)

=== Fifth place game ===
19 August 2018
13:00
Germany
25–25
Denmark
Legionów Hall, Kielce
Attendance: 203
Referees: Bennani, Bennani (SWE)
Quist 6
(9–13)
Møller 8
2× (yellow card) 2× (suspension)
Report
2× (yellow card)

FT: 25–25 Pen: 3–0

=== Third place game ===
19 August 2018; 15:30	South Korea	34–27	Sweden	Legionów Hall, Kielce; Attendance: 250; Referees: Alpaidze, Berezkina (RUS)
19 August 2018; 15:30	Yun 9	(17–14)	Andersson 7	Legionów Hall, Kielce; Attendance: 250; Referees: Alpaidze, Berezkina (RUS)
19 August 2018; 15:30	2× (yellow card) 1× (suspension)	Report	3× (yellow card) 1× (suspension)	Legionów Hall, Kielce; Attendance: 250; Referees: Alpaidze, Berezkina (RUS)

=== Final ===
19 August 2018; 18:00	Hungary	27–29	Russia	Legionów Hall, Kielce; Attendance: 2,500; Referees: Gasmi, Gasmi (FRA)
19 August 2018; 18:00	Kuczora 8	(12–15)	Mikhaylichenko 10	Legionów Hall, Kielce; Attendance: 2,500; Referees: Gasmi, Gasmi (FRA)
19 August 2018; 18:00	2× (yellow card) 2× (suspension)	Report	2× (yellow card) 5× (suspension)	Legionów Hall, Kielce; Attendance: 2,500; Referees: Gasmi, Gasmi (FRA)

== Final ranking ==
Rank	Team
Gold medal	Russia
Silver medal	Hungary
Bronze medal	South Korea
4	Sweden
5	Germany
6	Denmark
7	Netherlands
8	Spain
9	Romania
10	France
11	Norway
12	Croatia
13	Poland
14	Japan
15	Austria
16	Tunisia
17	Montenegro
18	Chile
19	Slovakia
20	Argentina
21	Angola
22	China
23	Egypt
24	Kazakhstan

2018 Women's Youth World Champions

Russia
First title

Team roster: Mariia Cherniaeva, Nadezhda Kolesnikova, Elena Mikhaylichenko, Anna Vereshchak, Anna Sheina, Alina Sinelnikova, Sofia Krakhmaleva, Viktoriia Turushina, Ekaterina Skivko, Valeriia Maslova, Elina Sidnina, Valeriia Kirdiasheva, Ekaterina Levchina, Kristina Mukhina, Elena Smirnova, Ekaterina Karabutova.
Head coach: Liubov Sidoricheva.

== Awards ==
- MVP : (Russia) Elena Mikhaylichenko
- Top Goalscorer : (Netherlands) Nikita van der Vliet (64 goals)

=== All-Star Team ===
- Goalkeeper : (Russia) Anna Vereshchak
- Right wing : (Hungary) Kíra Bánfai
- Right back : (South Korea) Park So-youn
- Centre back : (Russia) Valeriia Kirdiasheva
- Left back : (Sweden) Isabelle Andersson
- Left wing : (South Korea) Yun Ye-jin
- Pivot : (Netherlands) Nikita van der Vliet
