= Kelce =

Kelce is a surname. Notable people with the surname include:

- Donna Kelce (born 1952), American former banker
- Jason Kelce (born 1987), American former football player
- Kylie Kelce (born 1992), American podcaster and media personality
- Travis Kelce (born 1989), American football player
- Merl C. Kelce (20th century), businessman and namesake of the Macdonald–Kelce Library, University of Tampa

== See also ==
- Kelce (film)
- Kelsey (surname)
- Kielce (disambiguation)
- Kelcey (disambiguation)
