= Kelsie =

Kelsie is a unisex given name. Notable people with the name include:

- Kelsie B. Harder (1922–2007), American onomastician
- Kelsie Ahbe (born 1991), Canadian-American pole vaulter
- Kelsie Gibson (born 1993), British rower
- Kelsie Hendry (born 1982), Canadian pole vaulter
- Kelsie Pelling, better known by the handle KayPea, Canadian content creator and streamer

== See also ==
- Kelsay (surname)
- Kelsay
- Kelsey (given name)
- Kelsey (surname)
