= Kielce University =

Kielce University can refer to:

- Kielce University of Technology
- Jan Kochanowski University in Kielce
