= Alexandra Stepanova (disambiguation) =

Alexandra Stepanova (born 1995) is a Russian ice dancer.

Alexandra or Aleksandra Stepanova may also refer to:

- Aleksandra Stepanova (handballer) (born 1989), Russian handball player
- Alexandra Stepanova (weightlifter) (born 1991), Lithuanian weightlifter in 2016 European Weightlifting Championships
