= Kielce (disambiguation) =

Kielce may refer to:

- Kielce, a city in central Poland and the capital city of the Świętokrzyskie Voivodeship
- Kielce County, a powiat (county) in Poland, in Świętokrzyskie Voivodeship
- Kielce Voivodeship, a former unit of administrative division and local government in Poland
- SS Kielce, Polish-operated cargo ship

== See also ==
- Korona Kielce, a football club
- Kielce pogrom, the events in 1946 in Kielce when 37 Polish Jews were murdered and 82 wounded
- Kielce cemetery massacre, an event in 1943, in which 45 Jewish children were murdered by German Nazis
- Kielce Synagogue, a former synagogue in Kielce
- Kielce University of Technology, a university in Poland
- Kielce City Stadium, a multi-use stadium in Kielce, Poland
- Kelce
- Kelcey (disambiguation)
