= Michał Sołowow =

Polish businessman and rally driver (born 1962)

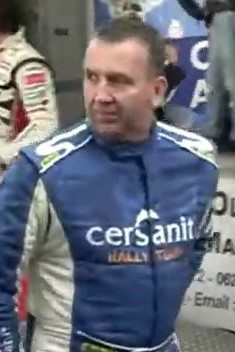
- Sołowow in 2010
- Born: 11 July 1962 (age 64); Kielce, Poland
- Citizenship: Poland
- Education: Kielce University of Technology
- Occupation: Businessman
- Known for: Richest person in Poland
- Spouse: Married
- Children: 1
World Rally Championship record
- Years active: 2003–2007, 2010, 2012–2015, 2020-present
- Co-driver: (Poland) Dariusz Burkat; (Poland) Maciej Baran; (United Kingdom) Chris Patterson
- Teams: M-Sport World Rally Team
- Rallies: 24
- Rally wins: 0
- Podiums: 0
- Stage wins: 0
- Total points: 0
- First rally: 2003 Swedish Rally
- Last rally: 2026 Rally Sweden

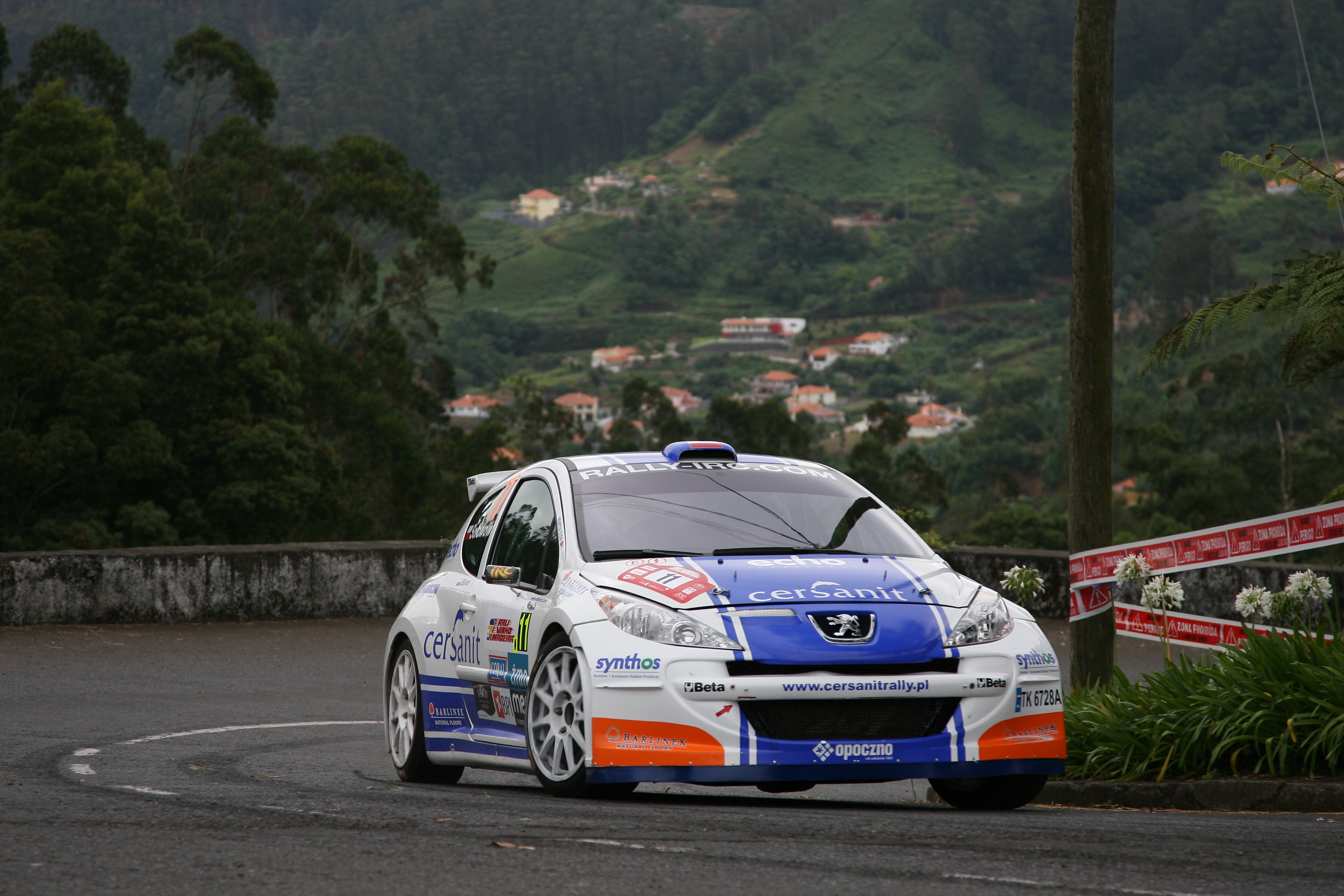
Sołowow driving a Peugeot 207 S2000

Michał Sołowow (born 11 July 1962) is a Polish billionaire businessman and rally driver. His industrial group has 18 production plants in eight countries and sells products in more than 60 countries on six continents and has over 16,000 employees.

Sołowow was one of the biggest Polish stock exchange investors (by 2018 he delisted all his companies) from Warsaw Stock Exchange but remains one of country's top private entrepreneurs and the largest Polish private investor abroad. He is the sole shareholder of the following companies: Synthos (chemical industry), Cersanit (sanitary ceramics and tiles) and Barlinek (producer of floorboards). The three companies remain at the core of Sołowow's capital group and are his main assets.

As of May 2025, Forbes estimated his net worth at US$13.5 billion making him 184th wealthiest person in the world.

== Business empire ==
Sołowow studied at Kielce University of Technology. In 1980s he earned money working in the West, so he was able to create Mitex construction enterprise in late 1980s in Kielce, when freedom of business was announced in still communist Polish People's Republic. After political and economical transformation in early 1990s, Mitex became one of bigger companies on regional construction market. Sołowow then became an active Warsaw Stock Exchange investor.

Sołowow bought shares in the chemical company Dwory (now Synthos) and funded its expansion with debt, taking advantage of low interest rates at the time. He then diversified into ceramic tiles, wood floors, real estate, new technologies and biotechnology sector. He gave up any direct management roles but is still an active investor (mostly on the private equity market).

In October 2019, Synthos Green Energy S.A., a Synthos Group company, entered into an agreement with US-Japanese consortium GE Vernova Hitachi Nuclear Energy to cooperate in the potential construction of a nuclear power plant in Poland based on small modular reactors (SMR) BWRX-300 technology. This is the first agreement of this type concluded by a Polish private company.

Sołowow manages his assets through several funds including Black Forest SICAV-SIF fund, FTF Columbus Fund, FTF Galleon, and Magellan Pro-Equity Fund I S.A. Sołowow also makes investments via IPOPEMA 112 FIZAN fund (e.g. Genicore, OncoArendi Therapeutics).

Sołowow is sole or key shareholder of the following companies:

- Synthos S.A. (chemical industry). One of the largest Polish chemical companies. It manufactures synthetic rubber and latex, styrene materials and vinyl dispersions;
- Cersanit S.A. – (sanitary ceramics and tiles). As of 2019 Cersanit is the largest ceramic tiles producer in Poland and second largest in Europe with 35% market share in Poland, 8% in Germany, 50% in Romania, and 40% in Ukraine. The company is the third largest ceramic products manufacturer in Europe and seventh in the world. In 2007 Sołowow merged Cersanit with Opoczno at the time the largest ceramic tiles manufacturer in Poland and second largest in Europe.
- Barlinek S.A. (producer of floorboards). One of the largest manufacturers of natural wooden flooring systems in the world, and the most recognizable brand of natural floors in Poland. Barlinek floorboards are exported to 75 countries on 6 continents. In 2012 the company had 60% of the Polish floorboard market;
- Komfort (carpets and linings retail chain);
- Homla (interior decoration retail chain);
- Nexterio (home decor);
- Corab (largest manufacturer and distributor of elements for photovoltaics installations in Poland);
- WP Systems (maintenance services for offshore wind farms);
- Synthos Green Energy (part of Synthos Group, responsible for new energy projects - offshore wind, nuclear, hydrogen);
- New Era Materials (composite materials from epoxy resins);
- 3DGence (manufacturer of 3D printers);
- Genicore (manufacturer of ovens for composite materials production);
- OncoArendi (R&D of particles for the production of drugs for the treatment of inflammatory diseases and cancer; WSE-listed);
- ExploRNA Therapeutics (R&D of mRNA modification technologies);
- Hemolens Diagnostics (medical devices manufacturer, R&D for non-invasive coronary artery assesment);
- Tikrow (online temporary work platform);
- GETCAR (car leasing);
- North Food – operator of restaurant chains in Poland and United Kingdom (North Food: fish and seafood; John Burg: New Zealand beef burgers; Veggie Hub);
- Yamly - a start-up company, producer and distributor of plant-based foods.

Sołowow's closed investments include:

- Max (food retail chain) - founded in 1992 and sold to Dutch group Ahold in 1996;
- NOMI (first DIY retail chain in Poland) - founded in 1994 and sold in 1999 to Kingfisher plc;
- Exbud (construction)- minority stake sold to Swedish Skanska in 2000;
- Viscoplast (manufacturer of medical dressings) - minority stake sold to 3M in 2001;
- Mitex (construction and real estate development) - Sołowow founded the company in 1980s and sold to French group Eiffage in 2002;
- Echo Dnia/Słowo Ludu (local daily newspapers) - both purchased in the 1990s and sold in 2005 to Norwegian Orkla;
- UltraPack S.A. (production of corrugated board packagings) – Sołowow bought the company in 2003 and sold in 2007 to British multinational packaging group Mondi;
- Echo Investment (real estate development) - Sołowow founded the company in 1994 and sold his shares in 2015 to Oaktree and PIMCO;

== Rally career ==
Sołowow was interested in amateur rally driving as a teenager. In 2001, thanks to sponsorship of his companies Synthos and Cersanit, he started professional rally career, aside from his business activities. After several years of training and starts, he began to obtain good results. He was the European vice-champion (2008, 2009, 2012), the vice-champion of Poland (2006, 2010), the European second vice-champion (2006, 2010), and second vice-champion of Poland (2004, 2005). He suspended his career in 2015 and resumed it in 2020.

== WRC results ==
Year	Entrant	Car	1	2	3	4	5	6	7	8	9	10	11	12	13	14	15	16	WDC	Points
2003	Cersanit Rally Team	Mitsubishi Lancer Evo VII	MON	SWE; 43	TUR	NZL	ARG	GRE	CYP	GER; 33	FIN	AUS	ITA	FRA	ESP	GBR			NC	0
2004	Cersanit Rally Team	Mitsubishi Lancer Evo VII	MON	SWE; 30	MEX	NZL	CYP	GRE	TUR	ARG	FIN	GER	JPN	GBR	ITA	FRA	ESP	AUS	NC	0
2005	Cersanit Rally Team	Mitsubishi Lancer Evo VII	MON	SWE; Ret	MEX	NZL	ITA	CYP	TUR	GRE	ARG	FIN	GER	GBR	JPN	FRA	ESP	AUS	NC	0
2006	Cersanit Rally Team	Subaru Impreza WRC 05	MON	SWE; 33	MEX	ESP	FRA	ARG	ITA	GRE	GER	FIN	JPN	CYP	TUR	AUS	NZL		NC	0
2006	Cersanit Rally Team	Mitsubishi Lancer Evo IX																GBR; 40	NC	0
2007	Cersanit Rally Team	Mitsubishi Lancer Evo IX	MON	SWE; 21	NOR	MEX	POR	ARG	ITA	GRE	FIN	GER	NZL	ESP	FRA	JPN	IRE		NC	0
2007	Errani Team Group	Fiat Abarth Grande Punto S2000																GBR; Ret	NC	0
2010	Michał Sołowow	Peugeot 207 S2000	SWE; 22	MEX	JOR	TUR	NZL	POR	BUL	FIN	GER	JPN	FRA	ESP	GBR				NC	0
2012	M-Sport Ford World Rally Team	Ford Fiesta RS WRC	MON	SWE; 20	MEX	POR	ARG	GRE	NZL	FIN	GER	GBR	FRA	ITA	ESP				NC	0
2013	Michał Sołowow	Peugeot 207 S2000	MON	SWE; 12	MEX	POR	ARG	GRE	ITA	FIN	GER	AUS	FRA	ESP					NC	0
2013	Qatar M-Sport World Rally Team	Ford Fiesta RS WRC													GBR; 14				NC	0
2014	M-Sport World Rally Team	Ford Fiesta RS WRC	MON	SWE; 17	MEX	POR	ARG	ITA		FIN; Ret	GER	AUS	FRA	ESP	GBR				NC	0
2014	Michał Sołowow	Ford Fiesta RS WRC							POL; Ret										NC	0
2015	Synthos Cersanit Rally Team	Ford Fiesta RS WRC	MON	SWE; Ret	MEX	POR	ARG	ITA	POL	FIN	GER	AUS	FRA	ESP	GBR				NC	0
2020	Barlinek Synthos RT	Škoda Fabia R5	MON	SWE; 24	MEX	EST	TUR	ITA	MNZ										NC	0
2021	Michał Sołowow	Citroën C3 Rally2	MON	ARC; 26	CRO	POR	ITA	KEN	EST	BEL	GRE	FIN	ESP	MNZ					NC	0
2022	Michał Sołowow	Volkswagen Polo GTI R5	MON	SWE; 16	CRO	POR	ITA	KEN	EST	FIN	BEL	GRE	NZL	ESP	JPN				NC	0
2023	Michał Sołowow	Škoda Fabia RS Rally2	MON	SWE; 21	MEX	CRO	POR	KEN	EST	FIN	GRE	CHL	EUR	JPN					NC	0
2024	Printsport	Škoda Fabia RS Rally2	MON	SWE; 14	KEN	CRO	POR	ITA	POL; 27	LAT	FIN	GRE	CHL	EUR	JPN				NC	0
2025	Printsport	Toyota GR Yaris Rally2	MON	SWE; 29	KEN	ESP	POR	ITA	GRE	EST	FIN	PAR	CHL	EUR	JPN	SAU			NC	0
2026	Printsport	Toyota GR Yaris Rally2	MON	SWE; 18	KEN	CRO	ESP	POR	JPN	GRE	EST	FIN	PAR	CHL	ITA	SAU			NC*	0*

* Season still in progress.

=== PWRC results ===
Year	Entrant	Car	1	2	3	4	5	6	7	8	PWRC	Points
2007	Errani Team Group	Fiat Abarth Grande Punto S2000	SWE	MEX	ARG	GRE	NZL	JPN	IRE	GBR; Ret	NC	0

== Personal life ==
Sołowow owns a residence in Masłów, a village on the borders of his hometown Kielce in Świętokrzyskie voivodship. His daughter, Karolina Sołowow (b. 1986), runs a charitable foundation "Fabryki Marzeń" ("Factories of Dreams") supporting disadvantaged youth.
