= Anna Vereshchak =

Russian handball player (born 2001)

Personal information
- Full name: Anna Andreevna Vereshchak
- Nationality: Russian
- Born: 18 July 2001 (age 25) Volgograd, Russia
- Height: 1.91 m (6 ft 3 in)

Sport
- Sport: Handball
- Position: Goalkeeper
- Current club: Dinamo Volgograd
- Number: 1

Senior clubs
- Years: Team
- 2019-: Dinamo Volgograd
Medal record
Youth World Championship
Gold medal – first place	2018 Poland

Anna Andreevna Vereshchak (born 18 July 2001) is a Russian handball player who plays for Dinamo Volgograd in the Russian Super League.

In September 2018, she was included by EHF in a list of the twenty best young handballers to watch for the future.

== Achievements ==
- Youth World Championship:
  - Gold Medalist: 2018

== Individual awards ==
- All-Star Goalkeeper of the Youth World Championship: 2018
- All-Star Goalkeeper of the Junior European Championship: 2019
