= Anna Sheina =

Russian handball player (born 2000)

Personal information
- Full name: Anna Igorevna Sheina
- Nationality: Russian
- Born: 13 May 2000 (age 26) Volgograd, Russia
- Height: 1.70 m (5 ft 7 in)

Sport
- Sport: Handball
- Position: Right wing
- Current club: Dinamo Volgograd
- Number: 33

Senior clubs
- Years: Team
- 2016-2020: Dinamo Volgograd 2nd
- 2018-: Dinamo Volgograd
National team
Years	Team	Apps	(Gls)
2018	Russia U18	6	(13)
2019	Russia U19	2	(5)
Medal record
Youth World Championship
Gold medal – first place	2018 Poland

Anna Sheina (Russian: Анна Игоревна Шеина) (born 13 May 2000) is a Russian handball player who plays for Dinamo Volgograd in the Russian Super League.

She also represented Russia at the 2019 Women's U-19 European Handball Championship in Hungary, placing 4th and at the 2018 Women's Youth World Handball Championship in Poland, where she received the gold medal.

At the end of 2019, she got injured.

== Achievements ==
- Youth World Championship:
  - Winner: 2018
- Student Championship of Russia
  - Winner: 2017
- Youth Championship of Russia
  - Winner: 2018-19
