= Emilie Steffensen =

Danish handball player (born 2001)

Personal information
- Full name: Emilie Bodholt Steffensen
- Nationality: Danish
- Born: 22 May 2001 (age 25) Ikast, Denmark
- Height: 1.80 m (5 ft 11 in)

Sport
- Sport: Handball
- Position: Left back
- Current club: Nykøbing Falster
- Number: 14

Youth career
- Years: Team
- 2016-2018: FC Midtjylland

Senior clubs
- Years: Team
- 2018-2020: Herning-Ikast
- 2020-: Nykøbing Falster
National team
Years	Team	Apps	(Gls)
2020–	Denmark	0	(0)

Emilie Steffensen (born 22 May 2001) is a Danish handball player who plays for Nykøbing Falster Håndboldklub and the Danish national team.

She represented Denmark in the 2017 European Women's U-17 Handball Championship, 2018 Women's Youth World Handball Championship, and in the 2019 Women's Junior European Handball Championship, placing 6th all three times.

== Achievements ==
- Danish Women's Handball League:
  - Silver Medalist: 2019
- Danish Cup:
  - Winner: 2019
