= Kelsey (surname) =

- Pronunciation: /ˈkɛlsi/
- Language: English

Origin
- Language: Old English
- Meaning: "Cēol's island or dry ground in a marsh"

Other names
- Variant forms: Kelce; Kelsay; Kelsie

Kelsey is an English surname. In modern times Kelsey has also become a given name for boys and girls in English-speaking countries. It may come from an Old English place name in Lincolnshire, from a word meaning "island of the ships" in Irish and Scots, or even a Norwegian one meaning "a dweller on the island, by the water".

Kelsey may refer to:

== Actors ==
- Edward Kelsey (1930–2019), English actor
- Greg Kelsey (1893–1967), stage name of British-born actor William Gregory Kelsall
- Ian Kelsey (born 1966), British actor
- Linda Kelsey (born 1946), American actress

== Athletes ==
- Arthur Kelsey (1871–1955), English football player
- Jack Kelsey (1929–1992), Welsh football player
- Lloyd Kelsey (1897–1948), American tug-of-war competitor

== Politicians and public servants ==
- Charles Kelsey (New York politician) (1821–1866), American politician
- Edwin B. Kelsey (1826–1861), American politician, lawyer, and businessman
- Niki Kelsey, American politician
- Thomas Kelsey (died c. 1680), important figure in the government of Oliver Cromwell
- Tim Kelsey director for patients and information in the National Health Service
- William H. Kelsey (1812–1879), American politician

== Other ==
- Andrew Kelsey (1819-1849), California pioneer
- Benjamin Kelsey (1813–1889), California pioneer, husband of Nancy
- Benjamin S. Kelsey (1906–1981), American Air Force test pilot and aeronautical engineer
- Carl Kelsey (1870–1953), American sociologist
- Frances Oldham Kelsey (1914–2015), American pharmacologist
- Henry Kelsey (c. 1667–1724), English fur trader, explorer, helped found Hudson's Bay Company
- Hugh Kelsey (1926–1995), Scottish bridge player and writer
- John Kelsey (cryptanalyst), cryptographer
- Nancy Kelsey, California pioneer, "the Betsy Ross of California" for sewing the Bear Flag

== See also ==
- Kelsay, Indian scout
- Kelsey (given name)
