= Kelcey =

Kelcey may refer to:

== People ==
Given name

- Kelcey Ayer, U.S. musician
- Kelcey Wetterberg, U.S. cheerleader for the Dallas Cowboys, featured in Dallas Cowboys Cheerleaders: Making the Team

Surname

- Herbert Kelcey (1856–1917), UK-born U.S. actor

=== Fictional characters ===
Given name

- Kelcey Barton, a character from the 1923 U.S. film Is Divorce a Failure?
- Kelcey Dale, a character from the 1927 U.S. film The Understanding Heart

Surname

- Detective Kelcey, a character from the 1930 U.S. film Alias French Gertie

== See also ==
- Rose Finn-Kelcey (1945–2014), UK artist
- Foord-Kelcey, a surname
- Kelsey (disambiguation)
- Kielce (disambiguation)
- Kelce (disambiguation)
