= Elena Mikhaylichenko =

Russian handball player

Personal information
- Full name: Elena Anatolyevna Mikhaylichenko
- Nationality: Russian
- Born: 14 September 2001 (age 25) Tolyatti, Russia
- Height: 1.79 m (5 ft 10 in)

Sport
- Sport: Handball
- Position: Left back
- Current club: CSKA Moscow
- Number: 8

Senior clubs
- Years: Team
- 2017–2020: HC Lada
- 2020–: CSKA Moscow
National team
Years	Team	Apps	(Gls)
2019–	Russia	18	(30)
Medal record
Representing ROC
Olympic Games
Silver medal – second place	2020 Tokyo	Team
Representing Russia
World Championship
Bronze medal – third place	2019 Japan	Team
World Youth Championship
Gold medal – first place	2018 Poland	Team

Elena Anatolyevna Mikhaylichenko (Russian: Елена Анатольевна Михайличенко, IPA: [ɪ̯ɪˈlʲenə mʲɪxəɪ̯lʲɪˈtɕenkə]; born 15 September 2001) is a Russian handball player for CSKA Moscow and the Russian national handball team.

Mikhaylichenko was top scorer for Russia at both Hungary 2018 (45 goals) and Poland 2018 (44), with almost all her goals scored from her preferred position of left back.

In September 2018, she was included by EHF in a list of the twenty best young handballers to watch for the future.

== Achievements ==
- Olympic Games:
  - Silver Medalist: 2020
- World Championship:
  - Bronze Medalist: 2019
- Youth World Championship:
  - Gold Medalist: 2018

== Individual awards ==
- Most Valuable Player of the Youth World Championship: 2018
- Most Valuable Player of the Junior European Championship: 2019
