= Nikita van der Vliet =

Dutch handball player (born 2000)

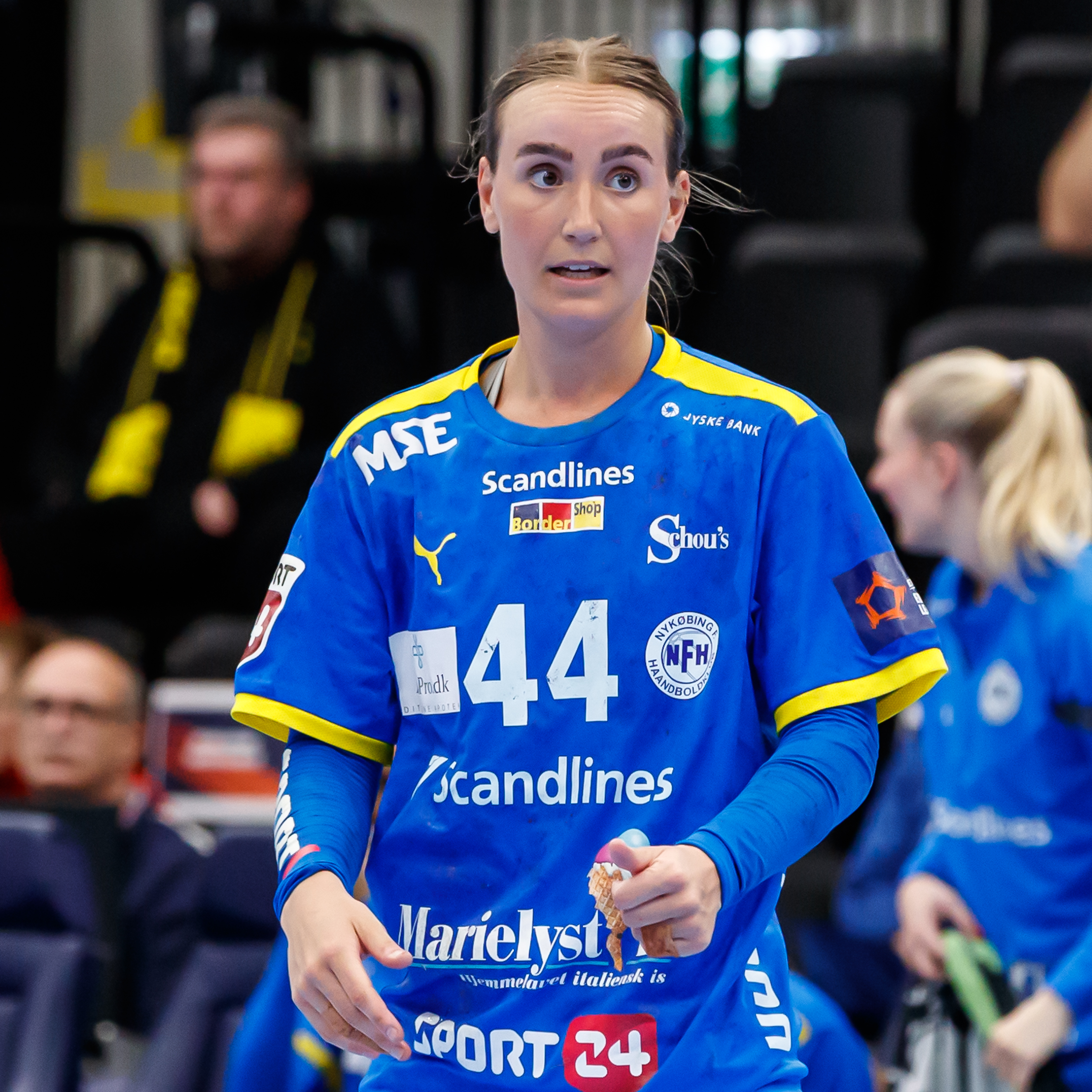

Personal information
- Nationality: Dutch
- Born: 14 March 2000 (age 26) Zaandam, Netherlands
- Height: 1.73 m (5 ft 8 in)

Sport
- Sport: Handball
- Position: Pivot
- Current club: Odense Håndbold
- Number: 44

Senior clubs
- Years: Team
- 2004–2009: HV Zaanstreek
- 2009–2020: VOC Amsterdam
- 2020–2023: NFH
- 2023–: Odense Håndbold
National team
Years	Team	Apps	(Gls)
2018–	Netherlands	72	(131)
- Updated on 14 December 2025

Nikita van der Vliet (born 14 March 2000) is a Dutch handball player for Odense Håndbold and the Dutch national team. In September 2018, she was included by the European Handball Federation in a list of the twenty best young handballers to watch for the future.

== National team ==
She debuted for the Dutch national team on the 28th of September 2018 in a match against Japan.

She represented the Netherlands at the 2020 European Women's Handball Championship. Two years later she played at the 2022 European Women's Handball Championship. At the 2023 World Women's Handball Championship he finished 5th with the Dutch team. She also represented Netherlands at the 2024 Olympics.

== Club career ==
Nikita van der Vliet started her career for VOC Amsterdam, where she played until 2020. Here she won the Dutch Women's Handball Championship in 2017, 2018 and 2019. In 2020 she joined Danish side Nykøbing-Falster. In the 2022-23 European League she reached the final with the club, where they lost to Danish rivals Ikast Håndbold.

In 2023 she joined Odense Håndbold. In the 2024-25 season, she achieved a perfect regular season with Odense Håndbold, winning 26 of 26 games. Later the same year she reached the final of the EHF Champions League where Odense lost the final to Hungarian Győri ETO KC 30–27. 11 days later she won the Danish Championship, when Odense beat Team Esbjerg in the final 2–1 in matches.

== Individual awards ==
- Youth World Championship Top Scorer: 2018
- All-Star Line Player of the Youth World Championship: 2018
