= Valeriia Kirdiasheva =

Russian handball player

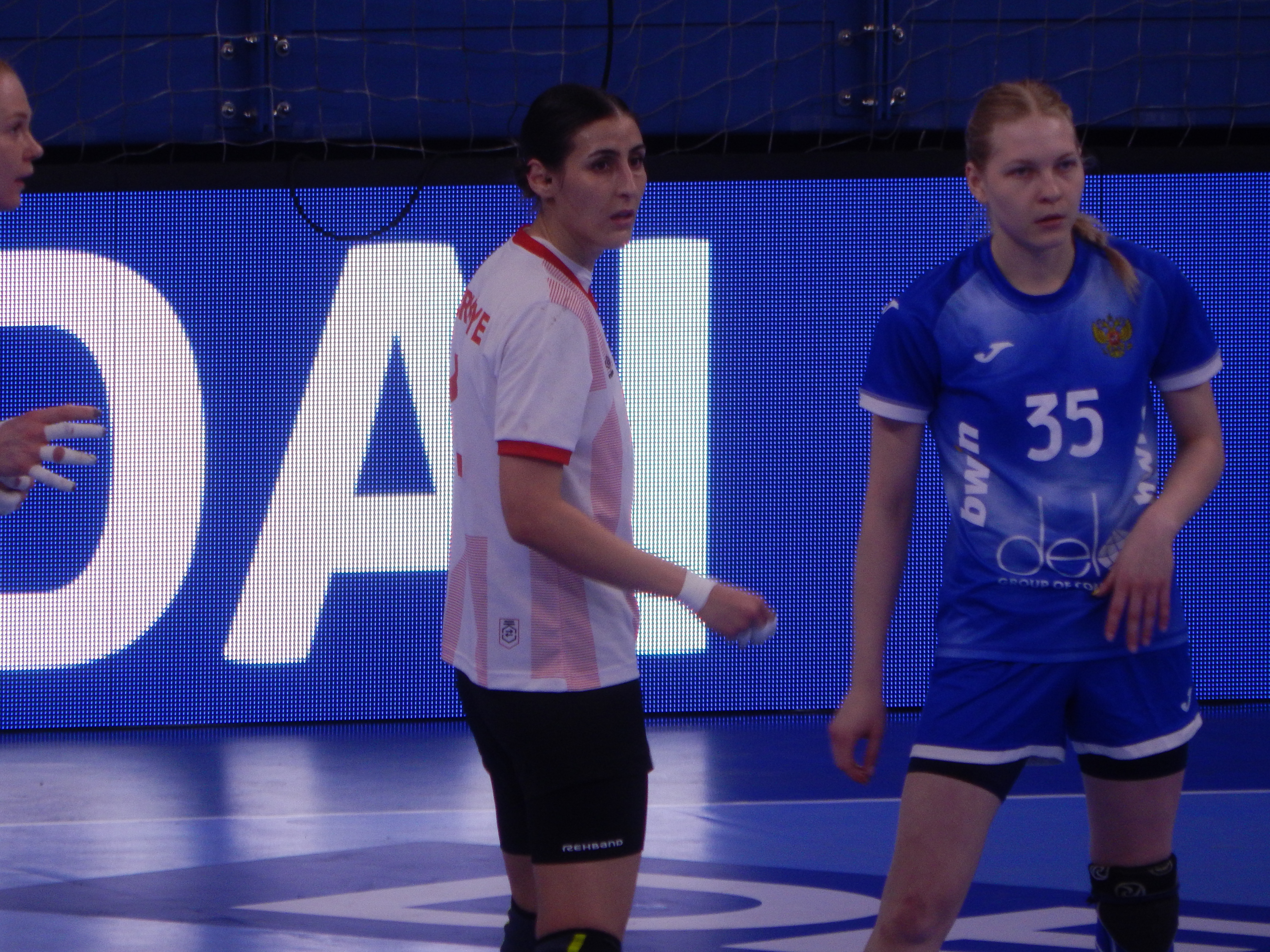
- Kirdiasheva (right)

Personal information
- Full name: Valeriia Kirdiasheva
- Nationality: Russian
- Born: 28 November 2000 (age 25) Buzuluk, Russia
- Height: 1.76 m (5 ft 9 in)

Sport
- Sport: Handball
- Position: Centre back
- Current club: CS Gloria Bistrița-Năsăud
- Number: 35

Youth career
- Years: Team
- 2016–2018: Handball Club Lada

Senior clubs
- Years: Team
- 2018–2023: Handball Club Lada
- 2023–2024: Rostov-Don
- 2024–: CS Gloria Bistrița-Năsăud
National team
Years	Team	Apps	(Gls)
2021–	Russia	2	(5)
Medal record
Youth World Championship
Gold medal – first place	2018 Poland

Valeriia Kirdiasheva (born 28 November 2000) is a Russian handball player who plays for CS Gloria Bistrița-Năsăud.

She also represented Russia at the 2019 Women's U-19 European Handball Championship in Hungary, placing 4th and at the 2018 Women's Youth World Handball Championship in Poland, were the Russian team won the final tournament.

On 15 January 2021, she extended her contract with Handball Club Lada, until the summer of 2022.

== Achievements ==
- Youth World Championship:
  - Gold Medalist: 2018

== Individual awards ==
- All-Star Centre back of the Youth World Championship: 2018
