= Michala Møller =

Danish handball player (born 2000)

Personal information
- Full name: Michala Elsberg Møller
- Nationality: Danish
- Born: 16 February 2000 (age 26) Aalborg, Denmark
- Height: 1.77 m (5 ft 10 in)

Sport
- Sport: Handball
- Position: Centre back
- Current club: Ferencvárosi TC
- Number: 44

Youth career
- Years: Team
- –: AIK Vejgaard
- 2015–2018: EH Aalborg
- 2018–2019: Herning-Ikast Håndbold

Senior clubs
- Years: Team
- 2018–2021: Herning-Ikast Håndbold
- 2021–2026: Team Esbjerg
- 2026–: Ferencvárosi TC
National team
Years	Team	Apps	(Gls)
2021–	Denmark	61	(125)
Medal record
Olympic Games
Bronze medal – third place	2024 Paris	Team
World Championship
Bronze medal – third place	2021 Spain
European Championship
Silver medal – second place	2022 Slovenia/North Macedonia/Montenegro
Silver medal – second place	2024 Austria/Hungary/Switzerland
- Updated on 12 April 2026

Michala Elsberg Møller (born 16 February 2000) is a Danish handball player for Ferencvárosi TC and the Danish national team.

== Career ==
Møller played youth handball at AIK Vejgaard and EH Aalborg. In 2018 she joined Herning-Ikast Håndbold. Here she played in the U18 team for one season, before being promoted to the first team. In her first season she won the Danish Cup.

In 2021 she joined league rivals Team Esbjerg. Here she won the Danish Championship in 2023 and 2024 and the Danish Cup in 2021 and 2022.

From the 2026–27 season she joined Hungarian Ferencvaros.

== National Team ==
She represented Denmark in the 2017 European Women's U-17 Handball Championship, 2018 Women's Youth World Handball Championship, and in the 2019 Women's Junior European Handball Championship, placing 6th all three times.

She represented Denmark at the 2021 World Women's Handball Championship in Spain and at the 2023 World Women's Handball Championship at home. At the 2024 Olympics she won a bronze medal. Later the same year, she won silver medals at the 2024 European Championship, losing to Norway in the final.

At the 2025 World Women's Handball Championship Denmark went out in the quarterfinal to France after winning all matches in the group stages. The Danish team was affected by a lot of players missing the tournament including goalkeepers Sandra Toft and Althea Reinhardt and pivots Sarah Iversen and Rikke Iversen. This was the first time since 2019 that Denmark left a major international tournament without any medals.

== Achievements ==
- Danish Women's Handball League:
  - Winner: 2023, 2024, 2026
  - Silver Medalist: 2019, 2025
- Danish Cup:
  - Winner: 2019, 2021, 2022
- EHF Champions League
  - Bronze Medalist: 2024-25
