= Dinamo Volgograd =

Russian women's handball club

- Full name: Handball Club Dinamo Volgograd
- Short name: HC Dinamo Volgograd
- Founded: 1972
- Arena: Dynamo Sports Hall
- Capacity: 1,500
- Head coach: Oleg Kuleshov
- League: Super League
- 2020-21: 9th
Home	Away

Dinamo Volgograd (Russian: Динамо Волгоград) is a Russian women's handball club from Volgograd. Founded in 1972 as Burevestnik Volgograd, it represented Rotor Volgograd following the collapse of the Soviet Union and was subsequently named Aqva before taking its current name in 2003.

Dynamo is the most successful team in the Russian Super League with nine titles, and in the 2001–02 season it set a record winning all the matches. It in international competitions won three titles: the 1995 Challenge Cup and Champions Trophy and the 2008 EHF Cup. In 2000 it became the first Russian team to reach the Champions League's semifinals since the USSR's break-up.

In reaction to the 2022 Russian invasion of Ukraine, the International Handball Federation banned Russian athletes, and the European Handball Federation suspended the Russian clubs from competing in European handball competitions.

== Honours ==
- Women's EHF Cup

Winners (1): 2008

- Women's EHF Challenge Cup

Winners (1): 1995

- EHF Women's Champions Trophy

Winners (1): 1995

- Russian League

Winners (12): 1993, 1995, 1996, 1999, 2000, 2001, 2009, 2010, 2011, 2012, 2013, 2014

== European record ==
Season	Competition	Round	Club	1st leg	2nd leg	Aggregate
2016–17	EHF Cup	R1	(Netherlands) SS/VOC Amsterdam	29–19	27–22	56–41
2016–17	EHF Cup	R2	(Switzerland) SPONO Eagles	35–23	38–28	73–51
2016–17	EHF Cup	R3	(Austria) Hypo Niederösterreich	29–23	32–26	61–49
2016–17	EHF Cup	Group B	(France) Brest Bretagne Handball	25–20	21–27	1st place
2016–17	EHF Cup	Group B	(Hungary) Alba Fehérvár KC	31–26	31–24	1st place
2016–17	EHF Cup	Group B	(Germany) HC Leipzig	32–24	33–27	1st place
2016–17	EHF Cup	1/4	(Germany) SG BBM Bietigheim	26–33	31–26	57–59

== Team ==
=== Current squad ===
Squad for the 2020-21 season.

Goalkeeper

- 1 (Russia) Anna Vereshchak
- 12 (Russia) Ekaterina Karabutova
- 26 (Russia) Maria Duvakina
- 50 (Russia) Nadezhda Kolesnikova

LW

- 2 (Russia) Ekaterina Litvnova
- 8 (Russia) Anzhelika Lebdeva

RW

- 3 (Russia) Ekaterina Mayorova
- 13 (Russia) Anastasia Starshova
- 33 (Russia) Anna Sheina

Line player

- 24 (Russia) Tatiana Medvedeva
- 33 (Russia) Elena Dukart
- 67 (Russia) Victoria Turushina
- 81 (Russia) Daria Stasenko

Back players
LB

- 7 (Russia) Olesya Goryachenko
- 11 (Russia) Ksenia Zubova
- 17 (Russia) Stefania Belolipetskaya
- 49 (Russia) Oksana Kolodyazhnaya

CB

- 9 (Russia) Sofia Krakhmaleva
- 36 (Russia) Ekaterina Dolmatova
- 56 (Russia) Ekaterina Skivko
- 77 (Russia) Elizaveta Dudkina

RB

- 24 (Russia) Elina Sidnina
- 99 (Russia) Sofia Lyzhina

=== Notable players ===
- (Ukraine) Viktoriya Borshchenko
- (Ukraine) Anastasiya Pidpalova
- (Ukraine) Viktoriya Tymoshenkova
- (Brazil) Jaqueline Anastácio
- (Brazil) Mayssa Pessoa
- (Tunisia) Asma Elghaoui
- (Belarus) Karyna Yezhykava
- (France) Katty Piejos
- (Russia) Nadezda Muravyeva
- (Russia) Elena Fomina
- (Russia) Liudmila Bodnieva
- (Russia) Yelena Avdekova
- (Russia) Maya Petrova
- (Russia) Daria Dmitrieva
- (Russia) Olga Levina
- (Russia) Ksenia Makeeva
- (Russia) Antonina Skorobogatchenko
- (Russia) Anna Sedoykina
- (Russia) Yelena Polenova
- (Russia) Anna Punko
- (Russia) Aleksandra Stepanova
- (Russia) Anastasia Suslova
- (Russia) Polina Vedekhina
- (Russia) Valentina Vernigorova
- (Russia) Polina Vyakhireva
- (Russia) Tatiana Khmyrova
- (Russia) Anna Kochetova
- (Russia) Yaroslava Frolova
