= Tamara Pál =

Hungarian handball player (born 2000)

Personal information
- Full name: Tamara Pál
- Nationality: Hungarian
- Born: 1 September 2000 (age 26) Debrecen, Hungary
- Height: 1.70 m (5 ft 7 in)

Sport
- Sport: Handball
- Position: Centre back
- Current club: CSM Slatina
- Number: 14

Senior clubs
- Years: Team
- 2016–2022: Győri ETO KC
- 2019–2022: → MTK Budapest (loan)
- 2022–2023: MTK Budapest
- 2023–2024: SCM Gloria Buzău
- 2024–: CSM Slatina
National team
Years	Team	Apps	(Gls)
2022–	Hungary	5	(2)
Medal record
Junior European Championship
Gold medal – first place	2019 Hungary
EYOF
Gold medal – first place	2017 Győr
Youth World Championship
Silver medal – second place	2018 Poland
Youth European Championship
Bronze medal – third place	2017 Slovakia

Tamara Pál (born 1 September 2000) is a Hungarian handballer who plays for CSM Slatina.

In September 2018, she was included by EHF in a list of the twenty best young handballers to watch for the future.

She made her international debut on 21 April 2022 against Portugal.

== Achievements ==
- Nemzeti Bajnokság I:
  - Winner: 2017, 2018, 2019
- Magyar Kupa:
  - Winner: 2018, 2019
- EHF Champions League:
  - Winner: 2017, 2018, 2019
- Junior European Championship:
  - Winner: 2019
- European Youth Olympic Festival:
  - Winner: 2017
- Youth World Championship:
  - Finalist: 2018
- Youth European Championship:
  - Bronze medalist: 2017
- ISF World Schools Championship:
  - Winner: 2016, 2018

== Awards and recognition ==
- All-Star Centre Back of the EHF Youth European Championship: 2017
- MVP of the ISF World Schools Championship: 2018
- Top Scorer of the Nemzeti Bajnokság I: 2021
