= Danish Handball Cup 2019 (women's handball) =

2019 Danish Handball Cup
Tournament details
- Country: Denmark

Final positions
- Champions: Herning-Ikast Håndbold
- Runners-up: Odense Håndbold

Awards
- Best player: Sabine Englert

The 2019 Danish Handball Cup (Danish: DHF's Landspokalturnering 2019), known as Santander Cup 2019 for sponsorship reasons, was the 56th edition of the national women's handball cup tournament. Nykøbing Falster Håndboldklub were the defending champions.

== Format ==
The initial 6 rounds are managed by the regional federations with the DHF taking over the tournament at the round of 16. It ultimately results in a final four event between Christmas and New Year. The winner of the tournament qualify for the Super Cup where they meet the season's league winner. If the same team wins both the league and the cup, the losing cup finalist will be participating in the Super Cup.

== Round of 32 ==
The round of 32 ties were scheduled through March to May 2019.

Team 1	Score	Team 2
3 April
HH Elite	27–24	Ringkøbing Håndbold
9 April
Gudme HK	24–25	Roskilde Håndbold
17 April
DHG Odense	22–36	København Håndbold
23 April
Oddense-Otting Håndbold	11–47	EH Aalborg
25 April
Fredericia HK	21–34	Skanderborg Håndbold
1 May
Farsø KFUM HK	19–42	Randers HK
2 May
Hadsten Håndbold	17–30	Aarhus United
7 May
Bjerringbro FH	23–39	Viborg HK
Vendsyssel Håndbold	25–33	TTH Holstebro
9 May
AGF Håndbold	25–24	SønderjyskE Håndbold
Lyngby HK	20–34	Nykøbing Falster Håndboldklub
Odder Håndbold	16–33	Silkeborg-Voel KFUM
TMS Ringsted	17–32	Ajax København
10 May
Tved G&I Håndbold	17–33	Odense Håndbold
14 May
Aalborg HK	12–35	Herning-Ikast Håndbold

== Round of 16 ==
The round of 16 ties were scheduled for August 2019.

Team 1	Score	Team 2
15 August
AGF Håndbold	19–40	Odense Håndbold
20 August
Roskilde Håndbold	20–30	København Håndbold
21 August
EH Aalborg	21–24	Nykøbing Falster Håndboldklub
Skanderborg Håndbold	23–23 (e.t.) (26–27)	TTH Holstebro
22 August
Randers HK	23–27	Team Esbjerg
Ajax København	25–31	Viborg HK
23 August
HH Elite	18–29	Herning-Ikast Håndbold
25 August
Silkeborg-Voel KFUM	26–30	Aarhus United

== Quarter-finals ==
The quarter-final ties were scheduled for 17–20 September 2018

Team 1	Score	Team 2
17 September
Nykøbing Falster Håndboldklub	23–27	København Håndbold
Odense Håndbold	24–24 (e.t.) (28–26)	Viborg HK
19 September
Team Esbjerg	25–26	Herning-Ikast Håndbold
Aarhus United	21–21	TTH Holstebro

== Final4 ==
The final four event is scheduled for 28–29 December 2019 in Gråkjær Arena, Holstebro.

Semi-finals
28 December
Odense Håndbold	26
København Håndbold	25
28 December
Herning-Ikast Håndbold	21
TTH Holstebro	18

Final
29 December
Odense Håndbold	25
Herning-Ikast Håndbold	33
Bronze medal match
29 December
København Håndbold	24
TTH Holstebro	28

=== Semi-finals ===
28 December 2019
13:30 (CEST)
Odense Håndbold
26-25 (ET)
København Håndbold
Gråkjær Arena, Holstebro
Attendance: 1,621
Referees: Hansen, Andersen
Groot 10
(14–10)
Rej 8
2× (yellow card) 2× (suspension)
Report
3× (suspension)

FT: 22–22 ET: 4–3

28 December 2019; 16:00 (CEST)	Herning-Ikast Håndbold	21–18	TTH Holstebro	Gråkjær Arena, Holstebro; Attendance: 1,810; Referees: Christiansen, Hesseldal
28 December 2019; 16:00 (CEST)	Fauske 8	(10–6)	Jensen 5	Gråkjær Arena, Holstebro; Attendance: 1,810; Referees: Christiansen, Hesseldal
28 December 2019; 16:00 (CEST)	1× (yellow card) 3× (suspension)	Report	4× (suspension)	Gråkjær Arena, Holstebro; Attendance: 1,810; Referees: Christiansen, Hesseldal

=== Bronze medal match ===
29 December 2019; 13:30 (CEST)	København Håndbold	24–28	TTH Holstebro	Gråkjær Arena, Holstebro; Attendance: 1,954; Referees: Søegaard, Kalisz Nielsen
29 December 2019; 13:30 (CEST)	Rej 11	(13–12)	Jensen 5	Gråkjær Arena, Holstebro; Attendance: 1,954; Referees: Søegaard, Kalisz Nielsen
29 December 2019; 13:30 (CEST)	3× (suspension)	Report	1× (yellow card) 1× (suspension)	Gråkjær Arena, Holstebro; Attendance: 1,954; Referees: Søegaard, Kalisz Nielsen

=== Final ===
29 December 2019; 16:00 (CEST)	Odense Håndbold	25–33	Herning-Ikast Håndbold	Gråkjær Arena, Holstebro; Attendance: 2,031; Referees: Albrechtsen, Trustrup
29 December 2019; 16:00 (CEST)	Groot 7	(9–20)	Løseth 7	Gråkjær Arena, Holstebro; Attendance: 2,031; Referees: Albrechtsen, Trustrup
29 December 2019; 16:00 (CEST)	2× (yellow card) 1× (suspension)	Report	2× (suspension)	Gråkjær Arena, Holstebro; Attendance: 2,031; Referees: Albrechtsen, Trustrup

== Final ranking ==
Danish Handball Cup 2019 winners

Herning-Ikast Håndbold
Eighth title

Team roster: Jessica Ryde, Michala Møller, Vilde Johansen, Cecilie Brandt, Stine Skogrand (captain), Helene Gigstad Fauske, Naja Nissen Kristensen, Sarah Iversen, Julie Gantzel Pedersen, Emilie Steffensen, Emma Friis, Sabine Englert, Annika Jakobsen, Jeanett Kristiansen, Tonje Løseth, Julie Jensen
Head coach: Mathias Madsen

=== Most valuable player ===
MVP was announced after the final on 29 December 2019.

Most valuable player: Sabine Englert (GER)
