= Denisa Vâlcan =

Romanian handball player (born 2000)

Personal information
- Full name: Denisa Andreea Vâlcan
- Nationality: Romanian
- Born: 19 September 2000 (age 26) Tulcea, Romania
- Height: 1.73 m (5 ft 8 in)

Sport
- Sport: Handball
- Position: Centre back
- Current club: SCM Craiova
- Number: 9

Senior clubs
- Years: Team
- 2019: SCM Râmnicu Vâlcea
- 2019–2022: CSM București
- 2022-: SCM Craiova
- Updated on 27 September 2019

Denisa Andreea Vâlcan (born 19 September 2000) is a Romanian handball player for SCM Craiova.

As a junior, she finished fifth in the 2019 Junior European Championship.

== International honours ==
- Youth European Olympic Festival:
  - Silver Medalist: 2017
