= Nyala Baijens =

Dutch handball player (born 2001)

Personal information
- Full name: Nyala Krullaars
- Nationality: Dutch
- Born: 25 September 2001 (age 25) Zoetermeer, Netherlands
- Height: 1.79 m (5 ft 10 in)

Sport
- Sport: Handball
- Position: Left back
- Current club: HSG Bensheim/Auerbach
- Number: 27

Senior clubs
- Years: Team
- 2017–2019: SV Dalfsen Handbal
- 2019–2024: København Håndbold
- 2021–2022: → EH Aalborg (loan)
- 2024: Buxtehuder SV
- 2024–2025: Stella Saint-Maur Handball
- 2025–: HSG Bensheim/Auerbach
Medal record
Junior European Championship
Silver medal – second place	2019 Hungary

Nyala Krullaars (born 25 September 2001) is a Dutch female handball player who plays for German club HSG Bensheim/Auerbach in the Frauen Handball-Bundesliga.

She also represented Netherlands in the 2019 Women's U-19 European Handball Championship, where she received silver.

She has been married to Dutch handballer Dani Baijens since June 2025. The very same month, she signed with German HSG Bensheim/Auerbach.

== Achievements ==
- Junior European Championship:
  - Silver Medalist: 2019
