= Kelsey (given name) =

- Pronunciation: /ˈkɛlsi/
- Gender: Unisex (male before became popular as a female name)

Origin
- Origin: Old English
- Meaning: "ship's island", "victory ship"

Other names
- Alternative spelling: Kelsie, Kelsi, Kelsy, Kelcie, Kelci, Kelcy, Kelcey, Kelsea
- Related names: Chelsea; Chelsey

Kelsey is a given name of English origin. The name most probably derives from an Old English given name Cēolsiġe, which meant "ship's victory", or it could be a place name meaning "Cenel's island". "Cenel's Island" is a combination of the Old English word "cenel", meaning "fierce", and "eg", meaning island.

Kelsey was the 201st most popular name for girls born in the United States in 2007, among the top 50 most popular names for girls in the 1990s, and last ranked among the top 1,000 most common names for boys in 1996. It was the 528th most common name for women in the United States in the 1990 census. Kelsey was ranked among the top 100 names for girls born in Scotland in 2007. It was also among the top 100 names for girls born in England and Wales in the late 1990s.

== People with the name ==
- Kelsey Asbille (born 1991), American actress
- Kelsey Bing (born 1997), American field hockey player
- Kelsey Bone (born 1991), American basketball player
- Kelsey Bulkin (born 1985), American singer and musician
- Kelsey Card (born 1992), American athlete
- Kelsey Cook (born 1989), American comedian
- Kelsey Davis (born 1987), American soccer player
- Kelsey Grammer (born 1955), American actor, director, and writer
- Kelsey Griffin (born 1987), American–Australian basketball player
- Kelsey Hightower (born 1981), American software engineer, developer advocate, and speaker
- Kelsey Impicciche, American YouTuber
- Kelsey Martin, American professor
- Kelsey McKinney, American journalist and author
- Kelsey Merritt (born 1996), Filipino-American model
- Kelsey Mitchell (basketball) (born 1995), American basketball player
- Kelsey Mitchell (cyclist) (born 1993), Canadian track cyclist
- Kelsey Piper, American journalist
- Kelsey Plum (born 1994), American basketball player
- Kelsey Reelick (born 1991), American rower
- Kelsey Scott (born 1976), American actress, screenwriter and director
- Kelsey Smith (1989–2007), American murder victim
- Kelsey Waldon, American country singer and songwriter
- Kelsey Wingert, American sports reporter

== See also ==
- Kelcy Warren (born 1955), American business executive and billionaire
- Kelcy Quarles (born 1992), American football player
- Kelcie Banks (born 1965), American boxer
- Kelsey Campbell (born 1985), American wrestler
- Kelsea Ballerini (born 1993), American country pop singer
- Kelsey (surname)
- Kelsie
- Kelsay
- Kelsay (surname)
