= Arthur Kelsey =

English footballer

Personal information
- Full name: Arthur George Kelsey
- Date of birth: 21 April 1871
- Place of birth: Dudley, England
- Date of death: 1955 (aged 83–84)
- Position: Inside forward

Senior career*
Years	Team	Apps	(Gls)
1892–1894	Reading		
1894–1895	29th Worcestershire Regiment		
1895–1896	West Bromwich Albion	11	(0)
1896–1897	Brierley Hill Alliance		
1897–1898	Wolverhampton Wanderers	0	(0)
Total		11	(0)
- * Club domestic league appearances and goals

Arthur George Kelsey (21 April 1871 – 1955) was an English footballer who played in the Football League for West Bromwich Albion
