= Macdonald–Kelce Library =

University of Tampa library named after John L. Macedonald and Merl C. Kelce

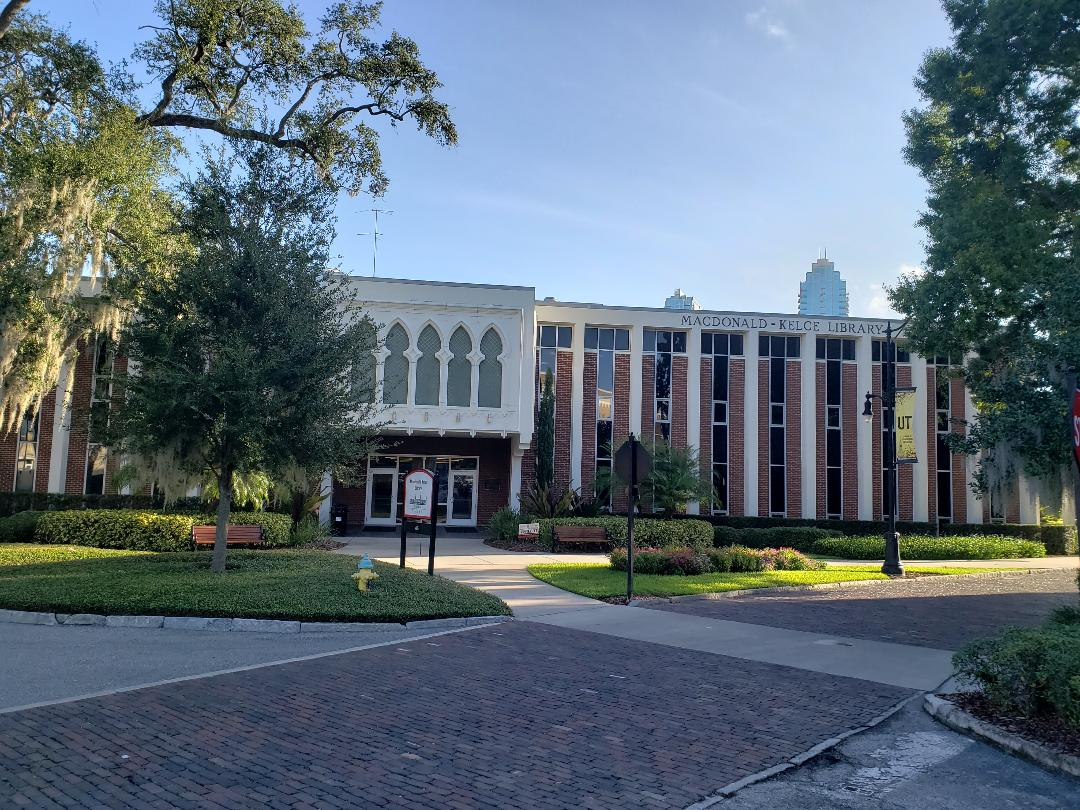

- Location within Florida

General information
- Type: Library
- Architectural style: Mid Century Modern
- Location: 401 W. Kennedy Blvd., Tampa, Florida, United States
- Coordinates: 27.9468°N 82.4670°W
- Groundbreaking: December 10, 1967
- Opening: October 19, 1969
- Cost: $1,519,108
- Owner: The University of Tampa

Technical details
- Floor count: 3
- Floor area: 49,000 square feet (4,600 m^{2})(public access)

Design and construction
- Architect: Fletcher-Valenti (of Tampa)

The Macdonald–Kelce Library is a library serving the University of Tampa. Named after John L. Macdonald and Merl C. Kelce, the library opened on October 19, 1969. The building was designed by the architectural firm Fletcher-Valenti of Tampa, Florida.

== History ==
The University of Tampa's main library was originally housed in early September 1933 in the old Tampa Bay Hotel's Grand Salon (i.e., ballroom). Its core collection consisted of donations from academic libraries such as Cornell University, Harvard University, and Carlisle Barracks. Local citizens also contributed to the fledgling library with sizable donations like those of Harry F. Barrell (5,000 books), Perry G. Wall, Mayor of Tampa (5,000 books), and James C. Alvord (4,000 books). When the University of Tampa was first opened in the 1931, it was Tampa Junior College. The first librarian of Tampa Junior College was Anna Regener. However, within a month it became evident that the Grand Salon would not be large enough to house this burgeoning collection, and the library was moved to the hotel's former main dining room at the northwest section of the building, into what is now known as Fletcher Lounge in Plant Hall.

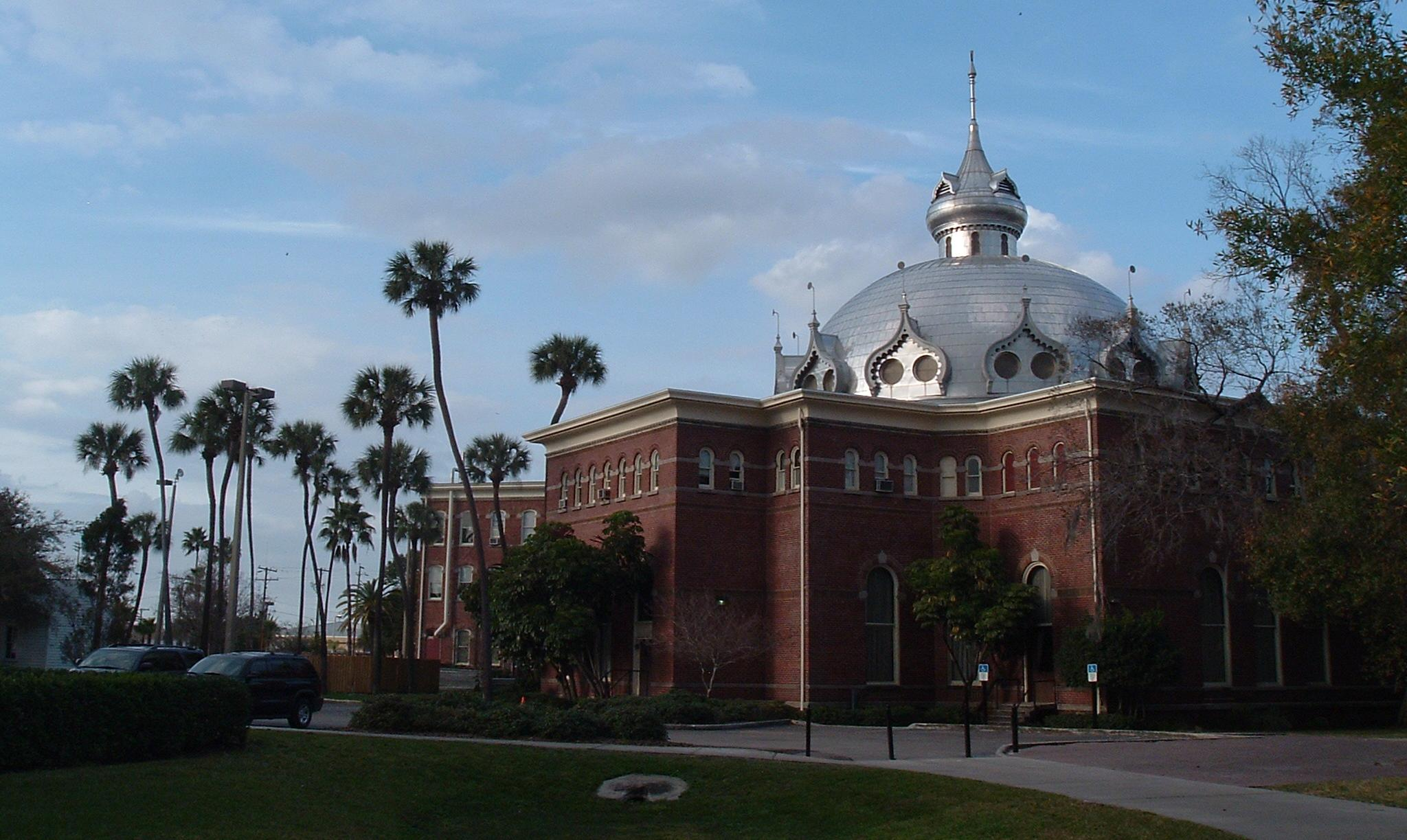
Dome of Plant Hall's Fletcher Lounge

It remained there until the summer of 1969, when student volunteers and library staff moved the books from Fletcher Lounge to the newly constructed building named after Merl C. Kelce, a St. Louis industrialist and benefactor of the University of Tampa. In 1999 the Merl Kelce Library was given its present name. Major and minor renovations of the Macdonald–Kelce Library have occurred in 2003 and 2016.

Throughout its history there have been seven library directors:

Anna Regener, 1933
Charlotte Anne Thompson, 1933–1969, 1974–1977: Thompson was the first Librarian Emeritus in the university's history.
Sandor Szilassy, 1969–1972
Barbara Ann Sugden, 1972–1974
Lydia Acosta, 1978–1996
Marlyn Cook Pethe, 1996–2022
Alisha Miles, 2022–Present.

== Building ==
=== Funding and opening ===
Funding for the construction of a new $1.3 million library was raised quietly by David M. Delo, University of Tampa President (1958–1971), in the late 1960s through the Tampa Library Fund campaign. Having fallen short of its goal, additional funding was sought and obtained in the amount of $427,661 through a federal construction grant under the Higher Education Facilities Act of 1965. In May 1968 Merl C. Kelce, chairman of the board of Peabody Coal Company of St. Louis and recipient of the 1961 Horatio Alger Award, donated an additional $250,000 to the Tampa Library Fund to cover the final expenditures. Up to that time Kelce's gift was the largest single contribution in the history of the University of Tampa. The library was dedicated on October 19, 1969, presided over by Delo. The total cost for the construction, repairs, remodeling and landscaping of the newly constructed Merl Kelce Library amounted to $1,519,108.

=== Design and purpose ===
The architectural design of the building broadly falls under Mid-century modern, but may have been regionally influenced by the Sarasota School of Architecture, also known as Sarasota Modern. It is an open-plan structure, with large planes of glass that imbue the interior spaces with natural illumination. A distinctive feature of the building is its facade, a series of five Moorish arches, placed over the entrance that echoes the Moorish style of architecture of its neighboring iconic building, Plant Hall.

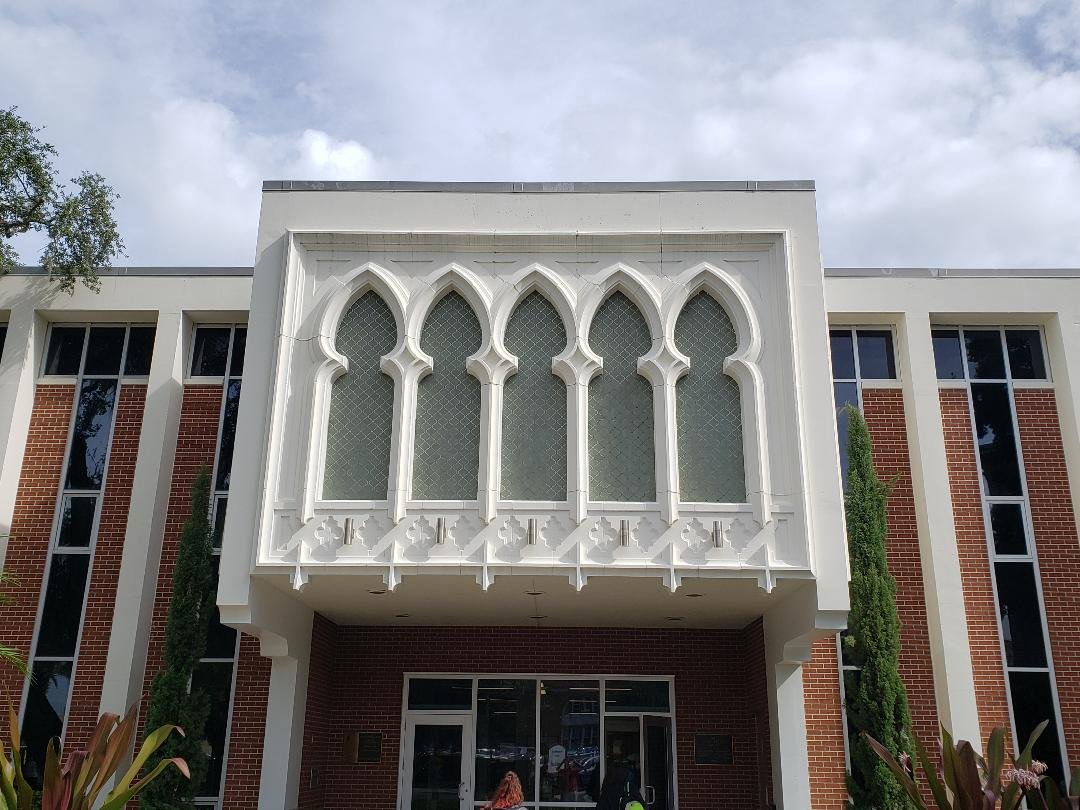
Macdonald–Kelce Library facade with Moorish arches

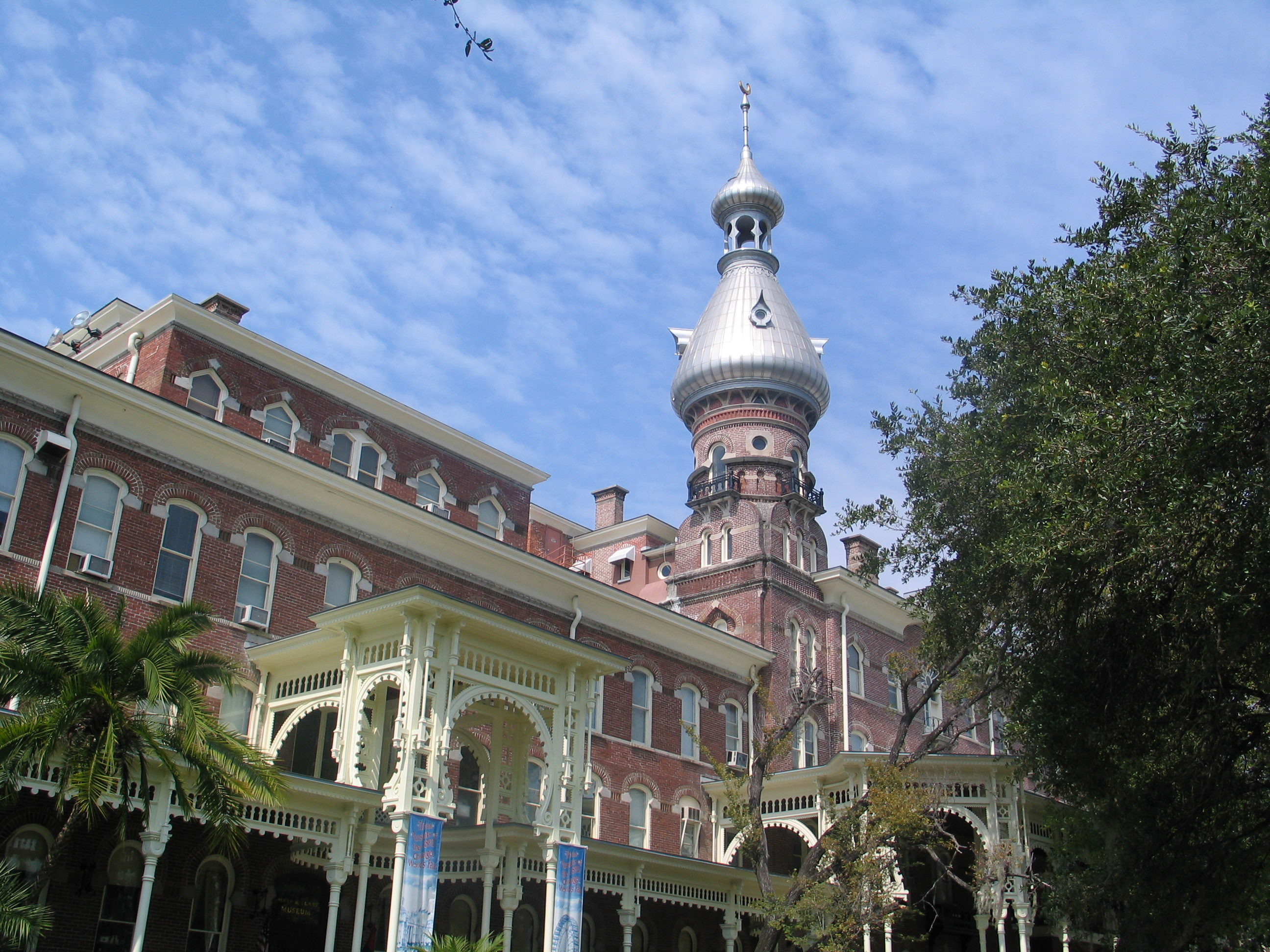
Plant Hall

The three-story, 49,000-square-foot facility was designed to house more than 200,000 volumes and provide seating capacity for patrons. The library has undergone two notable renovations. Under the direction of the President of the University of Tampa, Ronald L. Vaughn (1995–2024) a fundraising campaign called "Take UT to the Top" began in 1999. Its purpose was to raise enough funds to renovate structures on the University of Tampa's campus, which included $3.6 million for expansion and renovation of the Macdonald–Kelce Library. A 2003 donation by the Jaeb Family made interior design and technology upgrades possible, which were named in their honor, "The Robert and Lorena Jaeb Reference & Technology Center". In 2016 the library was closed for the summer while interior renovations took place, which included new lighting fixtures, interior upgrades and a new HVAC. The library currently features two computer labs, study carrels, collaborative study rooms, private study rooms, a classroom for faculty teaching, a library instruction room, a curriculum room that supports an educational teaching instruction program, and additional computers and scanning stations.

== Collections ==
=== Catalog ===
The majority of materials in the Macdonald–Kelce Library are housed in the bookstacks on the second floor and use the Library of Congress classification system. In order to create more space within the library for its escalating student population, most of the older print periodicals and microfilm are stored in an off-site storage facility. The library has roughly 172,300 titles with respect to its physical holdings. Beginning in the late 1970s Director Acosta moved the library into the direction of new technologies which included implementing an online catalog.

=== Archives and Special Collections ===
The archives and special collections are housed on the second floor of the Macdonald–Kelce Library. The collection holds the University of Tampa's archival documents (e.g., administrative, departmental, committee, institutional et al.) but also artifacts and information pertaining to the University of Tampa's and west-central Florida's history. Among the more salient items within its collections are scrapbooks and diaries of opera star and Broadway and Hollywood actress Blanche Yurka (1887–1974), and a large collection of papers from Florida's United States Representative, William C. Cramer (1922–2003).

=== Florida Military Collection ===
The collection began as a joint venture between the Suncoast Chapter Association of the United States Army and the University of Tampa. It was formally recognized by the Governor of Florida Reubin Askew on November 6, 1973 at the University of Tampa. The collection was dedicated on August 22, 1977. Established as a resource for scholars of American military history, it is "one of the largest private libraries of books and documents on military subjects in the Southeast United States." Contrary to its name, it "contains works that reflect military as well as semi-military topics (e.g., peace, medicine, fiction) in geographic areas other than Florida."

Originally, there were classrooms housed in the room located on the North end of the first floor, and the local public television station would periodically broadcast from there. It then became the room for Florida Military Collection until 2024, and is now the library's collaboration lab.

=== University of Tampa Institutional Repository (UoTIR) ===
The library also curates the University of Tampa's Institutional Repository, which is "a digital service that collects, preserves, and distributes the intellectual output of the UT community."

=== Selective Federal Depository Library ===
The Macdonald–Kelce Library is a selective Federal Depository Library. It has made a commitment to retain and make accessible to both the university community and to the general public at no fee selective resources of the United States government. In addition to the core collection of government documents, it retains roughly 30% of the resources of the United States Government Printing Office.

=== Digital Collections ===
The library offers a digitized archive of the university's history and scholarship. The Macdonald-Kelce Library Digital Collections includes the University Archives, Special Collections and Manuscripts, the Institutional Repository (UoTIR), Lectures, and Exhibits.

- The Digital Exhibits: One of the current Digital Exhibits is the “Historical Holiday Cards at the University of Tampa,” which houses a collection of cards from the 1950s through the 1980s. These cards are centered around the winter holidays from December to January and are card that were issued to the campus community by the UT Presidents.
- University of Tampa Institutional Repository: The repository is a digital service that collects, preserves, and promotes academic scholarship created by the university. The repository collections include faculty publications, graduate theses and dissertations, lectures and events, special collections, syllabi, undergraduate research, and university publications. One special collection from the repository is the “Tampa Book Arts Studio Blog,” which began in 2008. The collection has over 10,000 items emphasizing letterpress printing from private and independent presses. It is also tied to a few other collections related to books, art, and famous presses, including the Lee J. Harper Collection and the Dobkin Collection of 19th Century Letter Writing Manuals.
- UT Publications: The University of Tampa Publications is the digitized database for the student newspaper, yearbook, alumni magazine, and staff-faculty newsletter. The archives hold documents dating back to 1931 when the University of Tampa was still called Tampa Junior College.
