= Aleksandra Stepanova (handballer) =

Russian handball player

Personal information
- Nationality: Russian
- Born: 21 June 1989 (age 37) Izhevsk, Russia
- Height: 1.80 m (5 ft 11 in)

Sport
- Sport: Handball
- Position: Pivot
- Number: 17

Senior clubs
- Years: Team
- 2006-2014: Dinamo Volgograd
- 2014-2018: Rostov-Don
National team
Years	Team	Apps	(Gls)
–	Russia	7	(0)
- Updated on 4 December 2012

Aleksandra Sergeyevna Stepanova (Russian: Александра Сергеевна Степанова; born 21 June 1989) is a Russian handball player for the Russian national team.

With Dinamo Volgograd she won the Russian Championship in 2009, 2010, 2011, 2012, 2013 and 2014, and with Rostov-Don in 2015, 2017 and 2018.
