= Lunara Syzdykova =

Kazakhstani handball player

Personal information
- Nationality: Kazakhstani
- Born: 20 January 2000 (age 26)
- Height: 1.65 m (5 ft 5 in)

Sport
- Sport: Handball
- Position: Left back
- Current club: USC Dostyk
National team
Years	Team	Apps	(Gls)
–	Kazakhstan	47	(126)

Lunara Syzdykova (born 20 January 2000) is a Kazakhstani handball player for USC Dostyk and the Kazakhstani national team.

She represented Kazakhstan at the 2019 World Women's Handball Championship.
