= Kelsey, Ohio =

Town of Ohio

Coordinates: 39°57′52″N 80°54′54″W

Kelsey was a ghost town in Belmont County, in the U.S. state of Ohio.

== History ==
A post office was established at Kelsey in 1882, and remained in operation until 1930. The community was named after William J. Kelsey, the original owner of the town site.
