= Kelsey Peak =

Mountain in Utah, United States

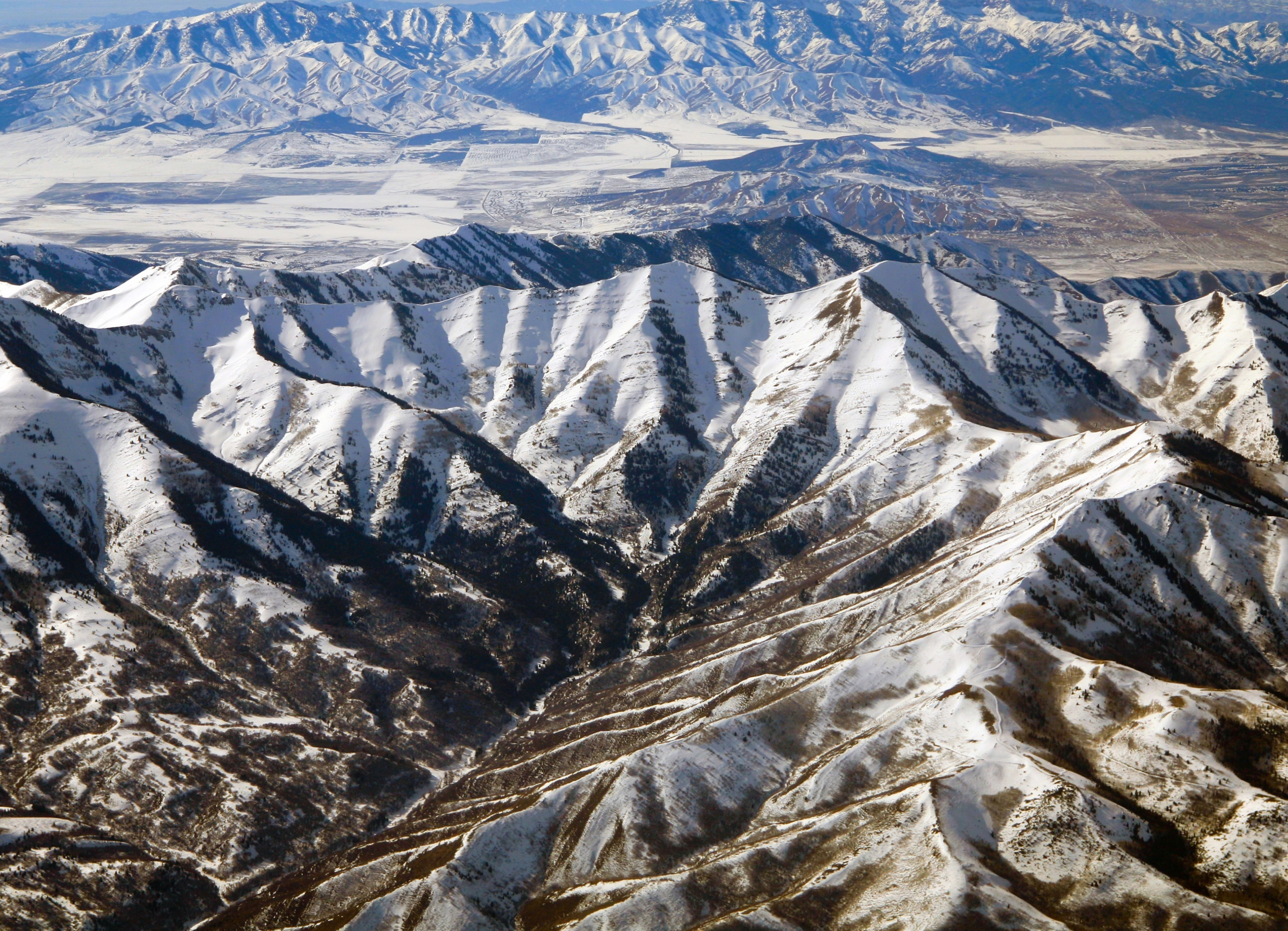
- Aerial view of East aspect, centered

Highest point
- Elevation: 10,373 ft (3,162 m)
- Prominence: 593 ft (181 m)
- Parent peak: Lowe Peak
- Isolation: 2 mi (3.2 km)
- Coordinates: 40°27′07″N 112°12′52″W

Naming
- Etymology: Eli Brazee Kelsey

Geography
- Location within Utah Location within the United States
- Country: United States
- State: Utah
- County: Tooele / Utah
- Parent range: Oquirrh Mountains; Great Basin Ranges
- Topo map: USGS Lowe Peak

Geology
- Rock age: Pennsylvanian
- Mountain type: Fault block
- Rock type: Oquirrh Formation

Climbing
- Easiest route: class 1 hiking

Kelsey Peak is a 10,373-foot-elevation (3,162-meter) mountain summit located on the common boundary that Tooele County shares with Utah County in Utah, United States.

== Description ==
Kelsey Peak is located 27 miles (43 km) southwest of downtown Salt Lake City and 6.5 miles (10.5 km) southeast of Tooele in the Oquirrh Mountains which are part of the Great Basin Ranges. It ranks as the fourth-highest summit in the Oquirrh Mountains, and eighth-highest in Tooele County. Precipitation runoff from the mountain's west slope drains to Settlement Canyon Reservoir near Tooele via Right Hand Fork Kelsey Canyon and Settlement Canyon, whereas the east slope drains to Utah Lake via West Canyon Wash. Topographic relief is significant as the summit rises 3,370 feet (1,027 meters) above West Canyon in 1.6 mile (2.6 km). This mountain's toponym was officially adopted in 1976 by the United States Board on Geographic Names to honor Eli B. Kelsey (1819–1885), Tooele County legislator, prosecuting attorney, real estate dealer, mining owner and developer.

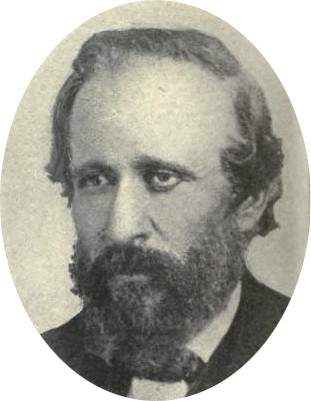
Eli B. Kelsey, namesake of Kelsey Peak

== Climate ==
Kelsey Peak is set within the Great Basin Desert which has hot summers and cold winters. The desert is an example of a cold desert climate as the desert's elevation makes temperatures cooler than lower elevation deserts. Due to the high elevation and aridity, temperatures drop sharply after sunset. Summer nights are comfortably cool. Winter highs are generally above freezing, and winter nights are bitterly cold, with temperatures often dropping well below freezing.

== See also ==
- List of mountains in Utah
- Great Basin
