= Kelsay (surname) =

Kelsay is a surname. Notable people with the surname include:

- Chad Kelsay (born 1977), American football player
- Chris Kelsay (born 1979), American football player
- John Kelsay, American academic
- John Kelsay (judge) (1819–1899), American politician
- Willie Kelsay (1892–1952), American jockey

== See also ==
- Kelsay, Indian scout
- Kelsey (given name)
- Kelsey (surname)
