= Kielce University of Technology =

Coordinates: 50°52′43″N 20°38′24″E

- Politechnika Świętokrzyska
- Motto: Develop the world together
- Established: 1965
- Rector: prof. dr hab. inż. Zbigniew Koruba
- Students: 4,465 (12.2023)
- Undergraduates: 12000
- Postgraduates: 5000
- Doctoral students: 1000
- Address: Al. 1000-lecia Państwa Polskiego 5, 25-541, Kielce, Poland
- Campus: Urban
- Affiliations: Socrates/Vine, Socrates/Adis, Socrates/Erasmus, Socrates/Minerva, Leonardo da Vinci, Polonium, Ceepus, Tempus
- Website: www.tu.kielce.pl/en/

The Kielce University of Technology (Polish: Politechnika Świętokrzyska) is a relatively young institution, although the traditions of higher education in Kielce go back to the beginning of the 19th century. It was here that Stanisław Staszic founded the Mining Academy, one of the first higher schools in Poland, which operated in the years 1816–1826 and provided qualified personnel to meet the needs of the Old Polish Industrial Basin. Higher education became available in Kielce again in 1965 when Kielce-Radom Evening Higher Engineering School was established. It was transformed into the Kielce University of Technology in 1974.

The University has five faculties:

- Faculty of Civil Engineering and Architecture,
- Faculty of Electrical Engineering, Automatic Control and Computer Science,
- Faculty of Environmental, Geomatic and Energy Engineering,
- Faculty of Mechatronics and Mechanical Engineering,
- Faculty of Management and Computer Modelling.

At present, over 9,400 students take courses in seven fields of studies: Civil Engineering, Environmental Engineering, Electrical Engineering, Computer Science, Mechanics and Machinery Design, Management and Marketing, Management and Production Engineering. The University is entitled to award a Doctor's degree in five academic disciplines: civil engineering, environmental engineering, electrical engineering, machine building and operation, mechanics, and a degree of Doctor Habilitated in machine building and operation. In the last discipline doctoral courses are also run.

Staff of 403 academic teachers, including 81 Professors and Doctors Habilitated and 153 PhDs together with laboratories (e.g. those of acoustic emission, laser technologies, soil mechanics, cracking mechanics, geometrical quantities measurement or materials strength) provide education in all fields of studies and specializations.

27 bilateral agreements provide basis for collaboration in research and teaching with 50 universities from 27 countries. The University is currently running 10 projects being a part of international programmes and also research tasks, one of which belongs to the Fifth EU Framework Programme.

== See also ==
- List of universities in Poland
