= Bangladesh women's national youth handball team =

National under-17 handball team

The Bangladesh

Information
- Association: Bangladesh Handball Federation (BHF)
- Coach: Md Kamal Ruhani

Colours
1st	2nd

Results

Youth Olympic Games
- Appearances: None

IHF U-18 World Championship
- Appearances: None

Asian Women's Youth Handball Championship
- Appearances: 2 (First in 2019)
- Best result: 2019, 2023 9th-place
- Last updated on 28 November 2025.

The Bangladesh women's youth national handball team is the national under–17 Handball team of the Bangladesh. Controlled by the Bangladesh Handball Federation BHF it represents the country in international matches.

== History ==
=== Youth Olympic Games ===
Champions Runners up Third place Fourth place

Youth Olympic Games records
Hosts	Result	Position	GP	W	D	L	GF	GA
(Singapore) 2010	Did not qualify							
(China) 2014	Did not qualify							
(Argentina) 2018	No Handball Event							
(Senegal) 2026	To be determined							
Total	0/2	0 Titles	0	0	0	0	0	0

=== IHF World Championship ===
Champions Runners up Third place Fourth place

IHF Youth World Championship records
Hosts	Result	Position	GP	W	D	L	GF	GA
(Canada) 2006	Did not qualify							
(Slovakia) 2008	Did not qualify							
(Dominican Republic) 2010	Did not qualify							
(Montenegro) 2012	Did not qualify							
(North Macedonia) 2014	Did not qualify							
(Slovakia) 2016	Did not qualify							
(Poland) 2018	Did not qualify							
(Croatia) 2020	Did not qualify							
(Georgia (country)) 2022	Did not qualify							
(China) 2024	Did not qualify							
Total	0/10	0 Titles	0	0	0	0	0	0

=== Asian Women's Youth Handball Championship ===
Champions Runners up Third place Fourth place

Asian Women's Youth Handball Championship records
Hosts	Result	Position	GP	W	D	L	GF	GA
(Thailand) 2005	Did not participate							
(Taiwan) 2007	Did not participate							
(Jordan) 2009	Did not participate							
(Japan) 2011	Did not participate							
(Thailand) 2013	Did not participate							
(India) 2015	Did not participate							
(Indonesia) 2017	Did not participate							
(India) 2019	Preliminary round	9th-place	4	0	0	4	57	176
(Kazakhstan) 2022	Did not participate							
(India) 2022	Group stage	9th-place	4	0	0	4	65	154
(China) 2025	Did not participate							
Total	2/11	0 Titles	8	0	0	8	330	176
