= 2019 Asian Women's Youth Handball Championship =

2019 handball championship in Asia

Tournament details
- Host country: India
- Venue(s): 1 (in 1 host city)
- Dates: 21–30 August
- Teams: 10 (from 1 confederation)

Final positions
- Champions: South Korea (8th title)
- Runner-up: China
- Third place: Japan
- Fourth place: Kazakhstan

Tournament statistics
- Top scorer(s): (Kazakhstan) Zhanerke Seitkassym (47 goals)

The 2019 Asian Women's Youth Handball Championship was the 8th edition of the championship held from 21 to 30 August 2019 at Jaipur, India under the aegis of Asian Handball Federation. It was the second time in history that championship was organised in India by the Handball Federation of India. It also acted as the qualification tournament for the 2020 Women's Youth World Handball Championship.

== Draw ==
The draw was held on 20 April 2019 in Jaipur, India.

Pot 1	Pot 2	Pot 3	Pot 4
India (H); South Korea	Japan; China	Kazakhstan; Uzbekistan	~~Iran~~; Bhutan; Chinese Taipei; Bangladesh; Nepal

Iran withdrew from the tournament before the draw and was substituted by Bhutan. Bhutan withdrew from the tournament after the draw, therefore AHF Executive Committee has decided to substitute Mongolia in Group B in place of Bhutan to balance the number of teams in each group.

== Preliminary round ==
All times are local (UTC+05:30).

=== Group A ===
Pos	Team	Pld	W	D	L	GF	GA	GD	Pts	Qualification
1	South Korea	4	4	0	0	168	77	+91	8	Semifinals
2	Japan	4	3	0	1	151	88	+63	6	Semifinals
3	Chinese Taipei	4	2	0	2	102	117	−15	4	5–8th place semifinals
4	Uzbekistan	4	1	0	3	106	126	−20	2	5–8th place semifinals
5	Bangladesh	4	0	0	4	57	176	−119	0	9th place game

Source: AHF
Rules for classification: 1) Points; 2) Head-to-head points; 3) Head-to-head goal difference; 4) Head-to-head goals scored; 5) Goal difference; 6) Goals scored; 7) Draw.

21 August 2019; 13:45	Chinese Taipei	22–37	Japan	Sawai Mansingh Indoor Stadium, Jaipur
21 August 2019; 13:45	Xin 5	(12–19)	Hagio 7	Sawai Mansingh Indoor Stadium, Jaipur

21 August 2019; 19:00	Bangladesh	16–55	South Korea	Sawai Mansingh Indoor Stadium, Jaipur
21 August 2019; 19:00	A. Akter, M. Akter 5	(9–23)	Kim S. 7	Sawai Mansingh Indoor Stadium, Jaipur

22 August 2019; 13:00	Uzbekistan	22–40	Japan	Sawai Mansingh Indoor Stadium, Jaipur
22 August 2019; 13:00		(13–20)		Sawai Mansingh Indoor Stadium, Jaipur

22 August 2019; 16:30	Chinese Taipei	17–38	South Korea	Sawai Mansingh Indoor Stadium, Jaipur
22 August 2019; 16:30		(11–16)		Sawai Mansingh Indoor Stadium, Jaipur

23 August 2019; 14:45	Chinese Taipei	30–26	Uzbekistan	Sawai Mansingh Indoor Stadium, Jaipur
23 August 2019; 14:45		(17–12)		Sawai Mansingh Indoor Stadium, Jaipur

23 August 2019; 16:30	Japan	45–9	Bangladesh	Sawai Mansingh Indoor Stadium, Jaipur
23 August 2019; 16:30		(29–5)		Sawai Mansingh Indoor Stadium, Jaipur

25 August 2019; 13:00	Bangladesh	16–33	Chinese Taipei	Sawai Mansingh Indoor Stadium, Jaipur
25 August 2019; 13:00		(7–17)		Sawai Mansingh Indoor Stadium, Jaipur

25 August 2019; 16:30	Uzbekistan	15–40	South Korea	Sawai Mansingh Indoor Stadium, Jaipur
25 August 2019; 16:30		(11–22)		Sawai Mansingh Indoor Stadium, Jaipur

26 August 2019; 13:00	Bangladesh	16–43	Uzbekistan	Sawai Mansingh Indoor Stadium, Jaipur
26 August 2019; 13:00		(5–22)		Sawai Mansingh Indoor Stadium, Jaipur

25 August 2019; 16:30	South Korea	35–29	Japan	Sawai Mansingh Indoor Stadium, Jaipur
25 August 2019; 16:30		(19–13)		Sawai Mansingh Indoor Stadium, Jaipur

=== Group B ===
Pos	Team	Pld	W	D	L	GF	GA	GD	Pts	Qualification
1	China	4	4	0	0	159	63	+96	8	Semifinals
2	Kazakhstan	4	3	0	1	159	87	+72	6	Semifinals
3	India (H)	4	2	0	2	148	104	+44	4	5–8th place semifinals
4	Nepal	4	1	0	3	51	151	−100	2	5–8th place semifinals
5	Mongolia	4	0	0	4	56	168	−112	0	9th place game

Source: AHF
Rules for classification: 1) Points; 2) Head-to-head points; 3) Head-to-head goal difference; 4) Head-to-head goals scored; 5) Goal difference; 6) Goals scored; 7) Draw.
(H) Hosts

21 August 2019; 12:00	Nepal	6–47	China	Sawai Mansingh Indoor Stadium, Jaipur
21 August 2019; 12:00	Gurung 3	(1–24)	Zhuang 8	Sawai Mansingh Indoor Stadium, Jaipur

21 August 2019; 17:15	Mongolia	16–58	India	Sawai Mansingh Indoor Stadium, Jaipur
21 August 2019; 17:15	Saikhantuya 7	(7–27)	Tanisha 12	Sawai Mansingh Indoor Stadium, Jaipur

22 August 2019; 14:45	Kazakhstan	25–32	China	Sawai Mansingh Indoor Stadium, Jaipur
22 August 2019; 14:45		(8–16)		Sawai Mansingh Indoor Stadium, Jaipur

22 August 2019; 18:15	Nepal	6–36	India	Sawai Mansingh Indoor Stadium, Jaipur
22 August 2019; 18:15		(5–16)		Sawai Mansingh Indoor Stadium, Jaipur

23 August 2019; 13:00	China	38–8	Mongolia	Sawai Mansingh Indoor Stadium, Jaipur
23 August 2019; 13:00		(23–5)		Sawai Mansingh Indoor Stadium, Jaipur

23 August 2019; 18:15	Nepal	15–46	Kazakhstan	Sawai Mansingh Indoor Stadium, Jaipur
23 August 2019; 18:15		(8–18)		Sawai Mansingh Indoor Stadium, Jaipur

25 August 2019; 14:45	Mongolia	22–24	Nepal	Sawai Mansingh Indoor Stadium, Jaipur
25 August 2019; 14:45		(7–12)		Sawai Mansingh Indoor Stadium, Jaipur

25 August 2019; 18:15	Kazakhstan	40–30	India	Sawai Mansingh Indoor Stadium, Jaipur
25 August 2019; 18:15		(16–13)		Sawai Mansingh Indoor Stadium, Jaipur

26 August 2019; 14:45	Mongolia	10–48	Kazakhstan	Sawai Mansingh Indoor Stadium, Jaipur
26 August 2019; 14:45		(3–28)		Sawai Mansingh Indoor Stadium, Jaipur

26 August 2019; 18:15	India	24–42	China	Sawai Mansingh Indoor Stadium, Jaipur
26 August 2019; 18:15		(12–22)		Sawai Mansingh Indoor Stadium, Jaipur

== Knockout stage ==
=== Bracket ===
Semifinals
28 August
South Korea	45
Kazakhstan	24
28 August
China	25
Japan	24

Final
30 August
South Korea	32
China	14
Third place
30 August
Kazakhstan	21
Japan	41

5–8th place bracket

5–8th place semifinals
28 August
Chinese Taipei	38
Nepal	4
28 August
India	34
Uzbekistan (pen.)	35

Fifth place
29 August
Chinese Taipei	32
Uzbekistan	33
Seventh place
29 August
Nepal
India	w/o

=== 5–8th place semifinals ===
28 August 2019; 11:00	Chinese Taipei	38–4	Nepal	Sawai Mansingh Indoor Stadium, Jaipur
28 August 2019; 11:00		(15–2)		Sawai Mansingh Indoor Stadium, Jaipur

28 August 2019
15:00
India
30–30 (4–5)
Uzbekistan
Sawai Mansingh Indoor Stadium, Jaipur

(18–15)

FT: 30–30 Pen: 4–5

=== Semifinals ===
28 August 2019; 17:00	South Korea	45–24	Kazakhstan	Sawai Mansingh Indoor Stadium, Jaipur
28 August 2019; 17:00		(24–10)		Sawai Mansingh Indoor Stadium, Jaipur

28 August 2019; 19:00	China	25–24	Japan	Sawai Mansingh Indoor Stadium, Jaipur
28 August 2019; 19:00		(11–14)		Sawai Mansingh Indoor Stadium, Jaipur

=== Ninth place game ===
28 August 2019; 13:00	Bangladesh	36–17	Mongolia	Sawai Mansingh Indoor Stadium, Jaipur
28 August 2019; 13:00		(17–8)		Sawai Mansingh Indoor Stadium, Jaipur

=== Seventh place game ===
29 August 2019; 15:00	Nepal	0–10 (Walkover)	India	Sawai Mansingh Indoor Stadium, Jaipur

=== Fifth place game ===
29 August 2019; 17:00	Chinese Taipei	32–33	Uzbekistan	Sawai Mansingh Indoor Stadium, Jaipur
29 August 2019; 17:00		(21–16)		Sawai Mansingh Indoor Stadium, Jaipur

=== Third place game ===
30 August 2019; 12:45	Kazakhstan	21–41	Japan	Sawai Mansingh Indoor Stadium, Jaipur
30 August 2019; 12:45		(13–16)		Sawai Mansingh Indoor Stadium, Jaipur

=== Final ===
30 August 2019; 17:00	South Korea	32–14	China	Sawai Mansingh Indoor Stadium, Jaipur
30 August 2019; 17:00		(15–5)		Sawai Mansingh Indoor Stadium, Jaipur

== Final standings ==
Rank	Team
1st place, gold medalist(s)	South Korea
2nd place, silver medalist(s)	China
3rd place, bronze medalist(s)	Japan
4	Kazakhstan
5	Uzbekistan
6	Chinese Taipei
7	India
8	Nepal
9	Bangladesh
10	Mongolia

Team qualified for the 2020 Youth World Championship
