= 2023 Asian Women's Youth Handball Championship =

10th edition of the championship

Tournament details
- Host country: India
- Venue(s): 1 (in 1 host city)
- Dates: 15–24 July
- Teams: 9 (from 1 confederation)

Final positions
- Champions: Japan (1st title)
- Runners-up: South Korea
- Third place: China
- Fourth place: Chinese Taipei

Tournament statistics
- Matches played: 22
- Goals scored: 1,166 (53 per match)

Awards
- Best player: (South Korea) Shin Chae-hyun

The 2023 Asian Women's Youth Handball Championship was the 10th edition of the championship held from 15 to 24 July 2023 at Noida Indoor Stadium, Noida, India under the aegis of Asian Handball Federation. It was the third time in history that championship was organised by the Handball Federation of India. It also acted as the qualification tournament for the 2024 Women's Youth World Handball Championship.

== Draw ==
The draw was held on 2 May 2023 at the Asian Handball Federation Headquarters, Surra, Kuwait.

=== Seeding ===
Teams were seeded according to the AHF COC regulations and rankings of the previous edition of the championship. Teams who did not participated in the previous edition were in Pot 3.

Pot 1	Pot 2	Pot 3
India; Kazakhstan	~~Uzbekistan~~	Bangladesh; China; Chinese Taipei; Hong Kong; Japan; Nepal; ~~Pakistan~~; South Korea

Pakistan and Uzbekistan withdrew from the tournament after the draw.

== Preliminary round ==
All times are local (UTC+5:30).

=== Group A ===
Pos	Team	Pld	W	D	L	GF	GA	GD	Pts	Qualification
1	South Korea	3	3	0	0	144	46	+98	6	Semifinals
2	China	3	2	0	1	116	66	+50	4	Semifinals
3	Kazakhstan	3	1	0	2	88	86	+2	2	5–8th place semifinals
4	Nepal	3	0	0	3	12	162	−150	0	5–8th place semifinals

Source: AHF
Rules for classification: 1) Points; 2) Head-to-head points; 3) Head-to-head goal difference; 4) Head-to-head goals scored; 5) Goal difference; 6) Goals scored; 7) Draw.

15 July 2023; 19:00	China	37–28	Kazakhstan	Noida Indoor Stadium, Noida
15 July 2023; 19:00		(21–10)		Noida Indoor Stadium, Noida
15 July 2023; 19:00		Report		Noida Indoor Stadium, Noida

16 July 2023; 16:00	China	28–33	South Korea	Noida Indoor Stadium, Noida
16 July 2023; 16:00		(13–18)		Noida Indoor Stadium, Noida
16 July 2023; 16:00		Report		Noida Indoor Stadium, Noida

17 July 2023; 14:00	Nepal	3–46	Kazakhstan	Noida Indoor Stadium, Noida
17 July 2023; 14:00		(1–25)		Noida Indoor Stadium, Noida
17 July 2023; 14:00		Report		Noida Indoor Stadium, Noida

19 July 2023; 12:00	Nepal	5–51	China	Noida Indoor Stadium, Noida
19 July 2023; 12:00		(2–27)		Noida Indoor Stadium, Noida
19 July 2023; 12:00		Report		Noida Indoor Stadium, Noida

19 July 2023; 16:00	South Korea	46–14	Kazakhstan	Noida Indoor Stadium, Noida
19 July 2023; 16:00		(23–6)		Noida Indoor Stadium, Noida
19 July 2023; 16:00		Report		Noida Indoor Stadium, Noida

20 July 2023; 14:00	Nepal	4–65	South Korea	Noida Indoor Stadium, Noida
20 July 2023; 14:00		(2–30)		Noida Indoor Stadium, Noida
20 July 2023; 14:00		Report		Noida Indoor Stadium, Noida

=== Group B ===
Pos	Team	Pld	W	D	L	GF	GA	GD	Pts	Qualification
1	Japan	4	4	0	0	171	38	+133	8	Semifinals
2	Chinese Taipei	4	3	0	1	101	80	+21	6	Semifinals
3	India (H)	4	2	0	2	97	98	−1	4	5–8th place semifinals
4	Hong Kong	4	1	0	3	59	123	−64	2	5–8th place semifinals
5	Bangladesh	4	0	0	4	65	154	−89	0	

Source: AHF
Rules for classification: 1) Points; 2) Head-to-head points; 3) Head-to-head goal difference; 4) Head-to-head goals scored; 5) Goal difference; 6) Goals scored; 7) Draw.
(H) Hosts

15 July 2023; 15:00	Bangladesh	28–33	India	Noida Indoor Stadium, Noida
15 July 2023; 15:00		(14–20)		Noida Indoor Stadium, Noida
15 July 2023; 15:00		Report		Noida Indoor Stadium, Noida

15 July 2023; 17:00	Chinese Taipei	9–37	Japan	Noida Indoor Stadium, Noida
15 July 2023; 17:00		(1–19)		Noida Indoor Stadium, Noida
15 July 2023; 17:00		Report		Noida Indoor Stadium, Noida

16 July 2023; 14:00	Japan	41–8	Hong Kong	Noida Indoor Stadium, Noida
16 July 2023; 14:00		(20–2)		Noida Indoor Stadium, Noida
16 July 2023; 14:00		Report		Noida Indoor Stadium, Noida

16 July 2023; 18:00	Bangladesh	14–41	Chinese Taipei	Noida Indoor Stadium, Noida
16 July 2023; 18:00		(6–21)		Noida Indoor Stadium, Noida
16 July 2023; 18:00		Report		Noida Indoor Stadium, Noida

17 July 2023; 16:00	Bangladesh	3–54	Japan	Noida Indoor Stadium, Noida
17 July 2023; 16:00		(2–25)		Noida Indoor Stadium, Noida
17 July 2023; 16:00		Report		Noida Indoor Stadium, Noida

17 July 2023; 18:00	Hong Kong	13–29	India	Noida Indoor Stadium, Noida
17 July 2023; 18:00		(5–12)		Noida Indoor Stadium, Noida
17 July 2023; 18:00		Report		Noida Indoor Stadium, Noida

19 July 2023; 14:00	Hong Kong	26–20	Bangladesh	Noida Indoor Stadium, Noida
19 July 2023; 14:00		(13–10)		Noida Indoor Stadium, Noida
19 July 2023; 14:00		Report		Noida Indoor Stadium, Noida

19 July 2023; 18:00	Chinese Taipei	18–17	India	Noida Indoor Stadium, Noida
19 July 2023; 18:00		(12–8)		Noida Indoor Stadium, Noida
19 July 2023; 18:00		Report		Noida Indoor Stadium, Noida

20 July 2023; 16:00	Hong Kong	12–33	Chinese Taipei	Noida Indoor Stadium, Noida
20 July 2023; 16:00		(5–18)		Noida Indoor Stadium, Noida
20 July 2023; 16:00		Report		Noida Indoor Stadium, Noida

20 July 2023; 18:00	India	18–39	Japan	Noida Indoor Stadium, Noida
20 July 2023; 18:00		(9–23)		Noida Indoor Stadium, Noida
20 July 2023; 18:00		Report		Noida Indoor Stadium, Noida

== Knockout stage ==
=== Bracket ===
Semifinals
22 July
South Korea	42
Chinese Taipei	22
22 July
Japan	34
China	22

Final
24 July
South Korea	23
Japan	24
Third place
24 July
Chinese Taipei	14
China	28

5–8th place semifinals
22 July
Kazakhstan	45
Hong Kong	12
22 July
India	10
Nepal	0

Fifth place
23 July
Kazakhstan	28
India	29
Seventh place
23 July
Hong Kong	10
Nepal	0

=== 5–8th place semifinals ===
22 July 2023; 12:00	Kazakhstan	45–12	Hong Kong	Noida Indoor Stadium, Noida
22 July 2023; 12:00		(24–7)		Noida Indoor Stadium, Noida
22 July 2023; 12:00		Report		Noida Indoor Stadium, Noida

22 July 2023	India	10–0; Walkover	Nepal	Noida Indoor Stadium, Noida
22 July 2023		Report		Noida Indoor Stadium, Noida

=== Semifinals ===
22 July 2023; 16:00	South Korea	42–22	Chinese Taipei	Noida Indoor Stadium, Noida
22 July 2023; 16:00		(22–9)		Noida Indoor Stadium, Noida
22 July 2023; 16:00		Report		Noida Indoor Stadium, Noida

22 July 2023; 18:00	Japan	34–22	China	Noida Indoor Stadium, Noida
22 July 2023; 18:00		(14–12)		Noida Indoor Stadium, Noida
22 July 2023; 18:00		Report		Noida Indoor Stadium, Noida

=== Seventh place game ===
23 July 2023	Hong Kong	10–0; Walkover	Nepal	Noida Indoor Stadium, Noida

=== Fifth place game ===
23 July 2023; 16:00	Kazakhstan	28–29	India	Noida Indoor Stadium, Noida
23 July 2023; 16:00		(13–16)		Noida Indoor Stadium, Noida
23 July 2023; 16:00		Report		Noida Indoor Stadium, Noida

=== Third place game ===
24 July 2023; 14:00	Chinese Taipei	14–28	China	Noida Indoor Stadium, Noida; Referees: Jullawong, Jullawong (THA)
24 July 2023; 14:00	Wang 4	(5–15)	Xing 10	Noida Indoor Stadium, Noida; Referees: Jullawong, Jullawong (THA)
24 July 2023; 14:00	1× (suspension)	Report		Noida Indoor Stadium, Noida; Referees: Jullawong, Jullawong (THA)

=== Final ===
24 July 2023; 15:00	South Korea	23–24	Japan	Noida Indoor Stadium, Noida; Referees: Ali, Al-Aradi (BHR)
24 July 2023; 15:00	Shin 9	(9–12)	Yasugahira 6	Noida Indoor Stadium, Noida; Referees: Ali, Al-Aradi (BHR)
24 July 2023; 15:00	1× (yellow card) 1× (suspension)	Report	2× (suspension)	Noida Indoor Stadium, Noida; Referees: Ali, Al-Aradi (BHR)

== Final standings ==
Rank	Team
1st place, gold medalist(s)	Japan
2nd place, silver medalist(s)	South Korea
3rd place, bronze medalist(s)	China^{[a]}
4	Chinese Taipei
5	India
6	Kazakhstan^{[a]}
7	Hong Kong
8	Nepal
9	Bangladesh

Team qualified for the 2024 Youth World Championship

^{a} China originally qualified after finishing third at the Asian championship, but would later qualify as the hosts of the World Championship. Their spot was therefore given to Kazakhstan.

== All Star Team ==
Position	Player
Goalkeeper	(China) Sun Yihan
Right wing	(Chinese Taipei) Chuan Heng-yi
Right back	(China) Xing Ziyan
Centre back	(Japan) Mami Nakamura
Left back	(South Korea) Beom Da-bin
Left wing	(Japan) Kio Jurina
Pivot	(South Korea) Yu Hui-bin
MVP	(South Korea) Shin Chae-hyun
