= 2015 Asian Women's Youth Handball Championship =

2015 handball championship in Asia

- Logo of 6th Asian Women's Youth Handball Championship

Tournament details
- Host country: India
- Venue: 1 (in 1 host city)
- Dates: 27 August - 3 September 2015
- Teams: 7 (from 1 confederation)

Final positions
- Champions: South Korea (6th title)
- Runners-up: Japan
- Third place: Kazakhstan
- Fourth place: China

Tournament statistics
- Matches played: 15
- Goals scored: 768 (51.2 per match)

The 2015 Asian Women's Youth Handball Championship is the 6th edition of the Asian Women's Youth Handball Championship organised by Handball Federation of India under the aegis of Asian Handball Federation. The championship was held from 27 August - 3 September 2015 at the Indira Gandhi Indoor Stadium in New Delhi, India.

== Draw ==
Group A	Group B
South Korea	Japan
China	Kazakhstan
Chinese Taipei	India
Uzbekistan	~~Iran~~

== Group A ==
Team	Pld	W	D	L	GF	GA	GD	Pts
South Korea	3	3	0	0	100	50	+50	6
China	3	2	0	1	94	76	+18	4
Chinese Taipei	3	1	0	2	58	78	−20	2
Uzbekistan	3	0	0	3	53	101	−48	0

27 August 2015; 15:00	Chinese Taipei	22 –17	Uzbekistan	Indira Gandhi Indoor Stadium, New Delhi
27 August 2015; 15:00		(9-8)		Indira Gandhi Indoor Stadium, New Delhi

27 August 2015; 16:45	China	20 – 34	South Korea	Indira Gandhi Indoor Stadium, New Delhi
27 August 2015; 16:45		(9-18)		Indira Gandhi Indoor Stadium, New Delhi

28 August 2015; 16:45	Chinese Taipei	15-28	South Korea	Indira Gandhi Indoor Stadium, New Delhi
28 August 2015; 16:45		(2-16)		Indira Gandhi Indoor Stadium, New Delhi

28 August 2015; 15:00	Uzbekistan	21-41	China	Indira Gandhi Indoor Stadium, New Delhi
28 August 2015; 15:00		(14-17)		Indira Gandhi Indoor Stadium, New Delhi

30 August 2015; 15:00	Chinese Taipei	21-33	China	Indira Gandhi Indoor Stadium, New Delhi
30 August 2015; 15:00		(14-12)		Indira Gandhi Indoor Stadium, New Delhi

30 August 2015; 16:45	Uzbekistan	15-38	South Korea	Indira Gandhi Indoor Stadium, New Delhi
30 August 2015; 16:45		(7-22)		Indira Gandhi Indoor Stadium, New Delhi

== Group B ==
Team	Pld	W	D	L	GF	GA	GD	Pts
Japan	2	2	0	0	71	44	+27	4
Kazakhstan	2	1	0	1	58	59	−1	2
India	2	0	0	2	42	68	−26	0

27 August 2015; 19:00	Kazakhstan	33-23	India	Indira Gandhi Indoor Stadium, New Delhi
27 August 2015; 19:00		(18-14)		Indira Gandhi Indoor Stadium, New Delhi

28 August 2015; 18:30	India	19-35	Japan	Indira Gandhi Indoor Stadium, New Delhi
28 August 2015; 18:30		(11-19)		Indira Gandhi Indoor Stadium, New Delhi

30 August 2015; 18:30	Kazakhstan	25-36	Japan	Indira Gandhi Indoor Stadium, New Delhi
30 August 2015; 18:30		(11-15)		Indira Gandhi Indoor Stadium, New Delhi

== 5th–7th placement matches ==
1 September 2015; 15:00	India	22-24	Uzbekistan	Indira Gandhi Indoor Stadium, New Delhi
1 September 2015; 15:00		(9-11)		Indira Gandhi Indoor Stadium, New Delhi

=== 5th/6th-place match ===
2 September 2015; 16:00	Chinese Taipei	20-22	Uzbekistan	Indira Gandhi Indoor Stadium, New Delhi
2 September 2015; 16:00		(11-10)		Indira Gandhi Indoor Stadium, New Delhi

== Knockout stage ==
=== Knockout round table ===
Semifinals
1 September
South Korea	35
Kazakhstan	18
1 September
Japan	23
China	22

Final
3 September
South Korea	27
Japan	22
Third-place game
3 September
Kazakhstan	25
China	32

=== Semifinal matches ===
1 September 2015; 17:00	South Korea	35-18	Kazakhstan	Indira Gandhi Indoor Stadium, New Delhi
1 September 2015; 17:00		(17-12)		Indira Gandhi Indoor Stadium, New Delhi

1 September 2015; 19:00	Japan	23-22	China	Indira Gandhi Indoor Stadium, New Delhi
1 September 2015; 19:00		(13-9)		Indira Gandhi Indoor Stadium, New Delhi

=== Bronze-medal match ===
3 September 2015; 15:30	Kazakhstan	25-32	China	Indira Gandhi Indoor Stadium, New Delhi
3 September 2015; 15:30		(13-14)		Indira Gandhi Indoor Stadium, New Delhi

=== Gold-medal match ===
3 September 2015; 17:30	South Korea	27-22	Japan	Indira Gandhi Indoor Stadium, New Delhi
3 September 2015; 17:30		(15-12)		Indira Gandhi Indoor Stadium, New Delhi

== Final standings ==
Rank	Team
1st place, gold medalist(s)	South Korea
2nd place, silver medalist(s)	Japan
3rd place, bronze medalist(s)	China
4	Kazakhstan
5	Uzbekistan
6	Chinese Taipei
7	India

Teams qualified for the 2016 Women's Youth World Handball Championship
