= Asian Women's Youth Handball Championship =

Handball championship in Asia

AHF Asian Women's Youth Handball Championship
- Current season, competition or edition: 2025 Asian Women's Youth Handball Championship
- Sport: Handball
- Founder: Asian Handball Federation (AHF)
- First season: 2005
- Confederation: Asia
- Most recent champion: China (1st title)
- Most titles: South Korea (8 titles)
- Related competitions: Asian Men's Youth Handball Championship

The Asian Women's Youth Handball Championship is the official competition for youth women's national handball teams of Asia, organised under the aegis of Asian Handball Federation. It takes place every two years. In addition to crowning the Asian champions, the tournament also serves as a qualifying tournament for the Women's Youth World Handball Championship.

== Summary ==
Year	Host	Final			Third place match		
Year	Host	Champion	Score	Runner-up	Third place	Score	Fourth place
2005; Details	(Thailand); Bangkok	South Korea	No playoffs	Japan	Thailand	No playoffs	Chinese Taipei
2007; Details	(Taiwan); Taipei	South Korea	No playoffs	Japan	Chinese Taipei	No playoffs	Hong Kong
2009; Details	(Jordan); Amman	South Korea	No playoffs	Japan	Kazakhstan	No playoffs	Thailand
2011; Details	(Japan); Yamaga	South Korea	No playoffs	Japan	Kazakhstan	No playoffs	Iran
2013; Details	(Thailand); Bangkok	South Korea	No playoffs	Japan	Kazakhstan	No playoffs	Uzbekistan
2015; Details	(India); New Delhi	South Korea	27–22	Japan	China	32–25	Kazakhstan
2017; Details	(Indonesia); Jakarta	South Korea	No playoffs	Japan	China	No playoffs	Kazakhstan
2019; Details	(India); Jaipur	South Korea	32–14	China	Japan	41–21	Kazakhstan
2022; Details	(Kazakhstan); Almaty	Iran	No playoffs	Kazakhstan	Uzbekistan	No playoffs	India
2023; Details	(India); Noida	Japan	24–23	South Korea	China	28–14	Chinese Taipei
2025; Details	(China); Jinggangshan	China	35–33	Japan	South Korea	30–21	Kazakhstan

== Medal table ==
Rank	Nation	Gold	Silver	Bronze	Total
1	South Korea	8	1	1	10
2	Japan	1	8	1	10
3	China	1	1	3	5
4	Iran	1	0	0	1
5	Kazakhstan	0	1	3	4
6	Chinese Taipei	0	0	1	1
6	Thailand	0	0	1	1
6	Uzbekistan	0	0	1	1
Totals (8 entries)		11	11	11	33

== Participating nations ==
Nation	(Thailand) 2005	(Taiwan) 2007	(Jordan) 2009	(Japan) 2011	(Thailand) 2013	(India) 2015	(Indonesia) 2017	(India) 2019	(Kazakhstan) 2022	(India) 2023	(China) 2025	Years
Bangladesh								9th		9th		2
China					5th	3rd	3rd	2nd		3rd	1st	6
Chinese Taipei	4th	3rd				6th		6th		4th	6th	6
Hong Kong		4th					6th			7th	8th	4
India	5th					7th		7th	4th	5th	7th	6
Indonesia							7th					1
Iran				4th	7th				1st		5th	4
Japan	2nd	2nd	2nd	2nd	2nd	2nd	2nd	3rd		1st	2nd	10
Jordan			5th									1
Kazakhstan			3rd	3rd	3rd	4th	4th	4th	2nd	6th	4th	9
Mongolia								10th				1
Nepal								8th		8th		2
Qatar		5th		5th								2
South Korea	1st	1st	1st	1st	1st	1st	1st	1st		2nd	3rd	10
Syria									5th			1
Thailand	3rd		4th		6th							3
Uzbekistan					4th	5th	5th	5th	3rd			5
Total	5	5	5	5	7	7	7	10	5	9	8	

== See also ==
- Asian Women's Handball Championship
- Asian Women's Junior Handball Championship
- Asian Men's Handball Championship
- Asian Men's Junior Handball Championship
- Asian Men's Youth Handball Championship
