= 2020 Women's Youth World Handball Championship =

8th Women's Youth World Handball Championship 2020
Tournament details
- Host country: Croatia
- Dates: Cancelled
- Teams: 24 (from 4 confederations)

The 2020 Women's Youth (U-18) World Handball Championship would have been the eighth edition of the championship to be held from 29 September to 11 October 2020 in Croatia under the aegis of International Handball Federation (IHF). It would have been the first time in history that the championship would have been organised by Croatian Handball Federation.

The championship was originally scheduled to be held in China from 18 to 30 August 2020. But on 7 February 2020, the IHF decided to move the tournament to another country due to concerns about the COVID-19 pandemic. Originally scheduled for 18 to 30 August 2020, the tournament was rescheduled to 29 September to 11 October 2020, due to the coronavirus pandemic. On 17 July 2020, the event was postponed.

On 22 February 2021, the tournament was cancelled.

== Qualification ==
Competition	Dates	Host	Vacancies	Qualified
			~~1~~	~~China~~
IHF Council Meeting (host nation)	27 February 2020	(Egypt) Cairo	1	Croatia
2019 European Women's U-17 Handball Championship	1–11 August 2019	(Slovenia) Celje	9	Hungary; Sweden; France; Denmark; Russia; Norway; Germany; Austria; Montenegro
2019 Women's U-17 EHF Championship	3–11 August 2019	(Italy) Lignano Sabbiadoro	1	Czech Republic
2019 Women's U-17 EHF Championship	3–11 August 2019	(Georgia (country)) Tbilisi	1	Switzerland
2019 Oceania Women's Youth Handball Championship	11–16 August 2019	(New Caledonia) Païta	1	New Zealand
2019 Asian Women's Youth Handball Championship	21–30 August 2019	(India) Jaipur	4	South Korea; Japan; Kazakhstan; Uzbekistan
2019 African Women's Youth Handball Championship	16–24 September 2019	(Niger) Niamey	3	Egypt; Angola; Tunisia
IHF Trophy – North America and Caribbean	15–20 October 2019	(Canada) Montreal	1	Canada
2020 South and Central American Women's Youth Handball Championship	Cancelled		3	Brazil; Chile; Argentina

New Zealand would have made their debut.

== Venues ==
- Split : Spaladium Arena
- Zagreb : Arena Zagreb
- Varaždin : Varaždin Arena
