= 2025 Asian Women's Youth Handball Championship =

Tournament details
- Host country: China
- Venue: 1 (in 1 host city)
- Dates: 18–26 July
- Teams: 8 (from 1 confederation)

Final positions
- Champions: China (1st title)
- Runners-up: Japan
- Third place: South Korea
- Fourth place: Kazakhstan

Tournament statistics
- Matches played: 20
- Goals scored: 1,180 (59 per match)
- Top scorer(s): (Kazakhstan) Nurdana Kyrgyzbay (49 goals)

Awards
- Best player: (China) Zhang Jingwen

The 2025 Asian Women's Youth Handball Championship was the 11th edition of the championship held from 18 to 26 July 2025 at the Gymnasium of Jiangxi University of Software Professional Technology (JXUSPT) in Jinggangshan, China under the aegis of Asian Handball Federation. It was the first time in history that championship was organised by the Chinese Handball Association. It also acted as the qualification tournament for the 2026 Women's Youth World Handball Championship.

== Draw ==
The draw was held on 16 June 2025 at the Conference Room of Jiangxi Software Vocational and Technical University in Jinggangshan, China.

== Preliminary round ==
All times are local (UTC+8).

=== Group A ===
Pos	Team	Pld	W	D	L	GF	GA	GD	Pts	Qualification
1	China (H)	3	3	0	0	104	62	+42	6	Semifinals
2	Kazakhstan	3	2	0	1	100	76	+24	4	Semifinals
3	Chinese Taipei	3	1	0	2	91	82	+9	2	5–8th place semifinals
4	Hong Kong	3	0	0	3	57	132	−75	0	5–8th place semifinals

Source: AHF
Rules for classification: 1) Points; 2) Head-to-head points; 3) Head-to-head goal difference; 4) Head-to-head goals scored; 5) Goal difference; 6) Goals scored; 7) Draw.
(H) Hosts

18 July 2025; 16:00	Chinese Taipei	24–31	Kazakhstan	Jinggangshan
18 July 2025; 16:00		(11–12)		Jinggangshan
18 July 2025; 16:00		Report		Jinggangshan

18 July 2025; 19:00	China	37–21	Hong Kong	Jinggangshan
18 July 2025; 19:00		(18–14)		Jinggangshan
18 July 2025; 19:00		Report		Jinggangshan

19 July 2025; 14:00	Hong Kong	18–51	Chinese Taipei	Jinggangshan
19 July 2025; 14:00		(11–24)		Jinggangshan
19 July 2025; 14:00		Report		Jinggangshan

19 July 2025; 18:00	Kazakhstan	25–34	China	Jinggangshan
19 July 2025; 18:00		(11–17)		Jinggangshan
19 July 2025; 18:00		Report		Jinggangshan

21 July 2025; 14:00	Kazakhstan	44–18	Hong Kong	Jinggangshan
21 July 2025; 14:00		(23–9)		Jinggangshan
21 July 2025; 14:00		Report		Jinggangshan

21 July 2025; 18:00	China	33–16	Chinese Taipei	Jinggangshan
21 July 2025; 18:00		(17–9)		Jinggangshan
21 July 2025; 18:00		Report		Jinggangshan

=== Group B ===
Pos	Team	Pld	W	D	L	GF	GA	GD	Pts	Qualification
1	Japan	3	3	0	0	107	74	+33	6	Semifinals
2	South Korea	3	2	0	1	108	67	+41	4	Semifinals
3	Iran	3	1	0	2	96	110	−14	2	5–8th place semifinals
4	India	3	0	0	3	63	123	−60	0	5–8th place semifinals

Source: AHF
Rules for classification: 1) Points; 2) Head-to-head points; 3) Head-to-head goal difference; 4) Head-to-head goals scored; 5) Goal difference; 6) Goals scored; 7) Draw.

18 July 2025; 14:00	South Korea	43–11	India	Jinggangshan
18 July 2025; 14:00		(20–5)		Jinggangshan
18 July 2025; 14:00		Report		Jinggangshan

18 July 2025; 21:00	Japan	40–27	Iran	Jinggangshan
18 July 2025; 21:00		(20–15)		Jinggangshan
18 July 2025; 21:00		Report		Jinggangshan

19 July 2025; 16:00	India	22–38	Japan	Jinggangshan
19 July 2025; 16:00		(11–22)		Jinggangshan
19 July 2025; 16:00		Report		Jinggangshan

19 July 2025; 20:00	Iran	27–40	South Korea	Jinggangshan
19 July 2025; 20:00		(10–21)		Jinggangshan
19 July 2025; 20:00		Report		Jinggangshan

21 July 2025; 12:00	India	30–42	Iran	Jinggangshan
21 July 2025; 12:00		(15–21)		Jinggangshan
21 July 2025; 12:00		Report		Jinggangshan

21 July 2025; 16:00	Japan	29–25	South Korea	Jinggangshan
21 July 2025; 16:00		(15–14)		Jinggangshan
21 July 2025; 16:00		Report		Jinggangshan

== Knockout stage ==
=== Bracket ===
Semifinals
23 July
Japan	39
Kazakhstan	24
23 July
China	28
South Korea	26

Final
26 July
Japan	33
China	35
Third place
26 July
Kazakhstan	21
South Korea	30

5–8th place semifinals
23 July
Chinese Taipei	29
India	24
23 July
Iran	32
Hong Kong	15

Fifth place
24 July
Chinese Taipei	33
Iran (pen)	34
Seventh place
24 July
India	36
Hong Kong	15

=== 5–8th place semifinals ===
23 July 2025; 12:00	Chinese Taipei	29–24	India	Jinggangshan
23 July 2025; 12:00		(14–13)		Jinggangshan
23 July 2025; 12:00		Report		Jinggangshan

23 July 2025; 14:00	Iran	32–15	Hong Kong	Jinggangshan
23 July 2025; 14:00		(16–8)		Jinggangshan
23 July 2025; 14:00		Report		Jinggangshan

=== Semifinals ===
23 July 2025; 16:00	Japan	39–24	Kazakhstan	Jinggangshan
23 July 2025; 16:00		(23–12)		Jinggangshan
23 July 2025; 16:00		Report		Jinggangshan

23 July 2025; 18:00	China	28–26	South Korea	Jinggangshan
23 July 2025; 18:00		(14–10)		Jinggangshan
23 July 2025; 18:00		Report		Jinggangshan

=== Seventh place game ===
24 July 2025; 16:00	India	36–15	Hong Kong	Jinggangshan
24 July 2025; 16:00		(17–6)		Jinggangshan
24 July 2025; 16:00		Report		Jinggangshan

=== Fifth place game ===
24 July 2025
18:00
Chinese Taipei
33–34
Iran
Jinggangshan

(15–16)

Report

FT: 30–30 Pen: 3–4

=== Third place game ===
26 July 2025; 16:00	Kazakhstan	21–30	South Korea	Jinggangshan
26 July 2025; 16:00		(11–16)		Jinggangshan
26 July 2025; 16:00		Report		Jinggangshan

=== Final ===
26 July 2025; 18:00	Japan	33–35	China	Jinggangshan
26 July 2025; 18:00		(15–18)		Jinggangshan
26 July 2025; 18:00		Report		Jinggangshan

== Final standings ==
Rank	Team
1st place, gold medalist(s)	China
2nd place, silver medalist(s)	Japan
3rd place, bronze medalist(s)	South Korea
4	Kazakhstan
5	Iran
6	Chinese Taipei
7	India
8	Hong Kong

Team qualified for the 2026 Youth World Championship

== All Star Team ==
Position	Player
Goalkeeper	(China) Wang Xiaoyan
Right wing	(South Korea) Lee Soo-ah
Right back	(Japan) Miina Nakasuji
Centre back	(South Korea) Cho Min-jin
Left back	(Japan) Hina Miura
Left wing	(Kazakhstan) Nurdana Kyrgyzbay
Pivot	(China) Liu Yutong
MVP	(China) Zhang Jingwen
