= 2025 IHF Trophy U17 – Asia =

Women's Youth Handball Championship qualifier

Tournament details
- Host country: Thailand
- Venue: 1 (in 1 host city)
- Dates: 17–22 November
- Teams: 9 (from 1 confederation)

Final positions
- Champions: Uzbekistan
- Runners-up: India
- Third place: Chinese Taipei
- Fourth place: Turkmenistan

Tournament statistics
- Matches played: 17

The 2025 IHF Trophy U17 – Asia took place in Suphan Buri, Thailand, from 17 to 22 November 2025. It acted as the Asian qualifying tournament for the 2026 IHF Inter-Continental Trophy. As the Asian Handball Federation had an extra spot at the 2026 IHF Women's U18 Handball World Championship, the champions will qualify.

Uzbekistan won the championship after beating India 55–53 in the final and qualified for the World Championship and Inter-Continental Trophy.

== Teams ==
- Chinese Taipei
- Hong Kong
- India
- Indonesia
- Malaysia
- Thailand
- Turkmenistan
- Vietnam
- Uzbekistan

== Group stage ==
=== Group A ===
Pos	Team	Pld	W	D	L	GF	GA	GD	Pts	Qualification
1	India	2	2	0	0	83	45	+38	4	Semifinals
2	Thailand (H)	2	1	0	1	49	67	−18	2	Fifth place game
3	Malaysia	2	0	0	2	46	66	−20	0	7–9 placement group

Source: 2025 IHF Trophy U17 – Asia
Rules for classification: 1) Points; 2) Head-to-head points; 3) Head-to-head goal difference; 4) Head-to-head goals scored; 5) Goal difference; 6) Goals scored; 7) Draw.
(H) Hosts

17 November 2025; 13:00	Thailand	26–24	Malaysia	Gymnasiun Pattaya 8 School, Suphan Buri
17 November 2025; 13:00		(14–10)		Gymnasiun Pattaya 8 School, Suphan Buri
17 November 2025; 13:00		Report		Gymnasiun Pattaya 8 School, Suphan Buri

18 November 2025; 13:00	India	40–22	Malaysia	Gymnasiun Pattaya 8 School, Suphan Buri
18 November 2025; 13:00		(21–9)		Gymnasiun Pattaya 8 School, Suphan Buri
18 November 2025; 13:00		Report		Gymnasiun Pattaya 8 School, Suphan Buri

19 November 2025; 13:00	Thailand	23–43	India	Gymnasiun Pattaya 8 School, Suphan Buri
19 November 2025; 13:00		(11–22)		Gymnasiun Pattaya 8 School, Suphan Buri
19 November 2025; 13:00		Report		Gymnasiun Pattaya 8 School, Suphan Buri

=== Group B ===
Pos	Team	Pld	W	D	L	GF	GA	GD	Pts	Qualification
1	Uzbekistan	2	2	0	0	99	34	+65	4	Semifinals
2	Hong Kong	2	1	0	1	41	69	−28	2	Fifth place game
3	Vietnam	2	0	0	2	39	76	−37	0	7–9 placement group

Source: 2025 IHF Trophy U17 – Asia
Rules for classification: 1) Points; 2) Head-to-head points; 3) Head-to-head goal difference; 4) Head-to-head goals scored; 5) Goal difference; 6) Goals scored; 7) Draw.

17 November 2025; 15:00	Hong Kong	16–48	Uzbekistan	Gymnasiun Pattaya 8 School, Suphan Buri
17 November 2025; 15:00		(7–23)		Gymnasiun Pattaya 8 School, Suphan Buri
17 November 2025; 15:00		Report		Gymnasiun Pattaya 8 School, Suphan Buri

18 November 2025; 15:00	Vietnam	21–25	Hong Kong	Gymnasiun Pattaya 8 School, Suphan Buri
18 November 2025; 15:00		(14–15)		Gymnasiun Pattaya 8 School, Suphan Buri
18 November 2025; 15:00		Report		Gymnasiun Pattaya 8 School, Suphan Buri

19 November 2025; 15:00	Uzbekistan	51–18	Vietnam	Gymnasiun Pattaya 8 School, Suphan Buri
19 November 2025; 15:00		(28–5)		Gymnasiun Pattaya 8 School, Suphan Buri
19 November 2025; 15:00		Report		Gymnasiun Pattaya 8 School, Suphan Buri

=== Group C ===
Pos	Team	Pld	W	D	L	GF	GA	GD	Pts	Qualification
1	Chinese Taipei	2	2	0	0	75	32	+43	4	Semifinals
2	Turkmenistan	2	1	0	1	58	63	−5	2	Semifinals
3	Indonesia	2	0	0	2	43	81	−38	0	7–9 placement group

Source: 2025 IHF Trophy U17 – Asia
Rules for classification: 1) Points; 2) Head-to-head points; 3) Head-to-head goal difference; 4) Head-to-head goals scored; 5) Goal difference; 6) Goals scored; 7) Draw.

17 November 2025; 17:00	Indonesia	12–43	Chinese Taipei	Gymnasiun Pattaya 8 School, Suphan Buri
17 November 2025; 17:00		(8–19)		Gymnasiun Pattaya 8 School, Suphan Buri
17 November 2025; 17:00		Report		Gymnasiun Pattaya 8 School, Suphan Buri

18 November 2025; 17:00	Turkmenistan	38–31	Indonesia	Gymnasiun Pattaya 8 School, Suphan Buri
18 November 2025; 17:00		(14–13)		Gymnasiun Pattaya 8 School, Suphan Buri
18 November 2025; 17:00		Report		Gymnasiun Pattaya 8 School, Suphan Buri

19 November 2025; 17:00	Chinese Taipei	32–20	Turkmenistan	Gymnasiun Pattaya 8 School, Suphan Buri
19 November 2025; 17:00		(17–10)		Gymnasiun Pattaya 8 School, Suphan Buri
19 November 2025; 17:00		Report		Gymnasiun Pattaya 8 School, Suphan Buri

== Placement round ==
=== 7–9 placement group ===
Pos	Team	Pld	W	D	L	GF	GA	GD	Pts
7	Indonesia	2	1	0	1	71	58	+13	2
8	Vietnam	2	1	0	1	57	59	−2	2
9	Malaysia	2	1	0	1	58	69	−11	2

Source: 2025 IHF Trophy U17 – Asia
Rules for classification: 1) Points; 2) Head-to-head points; 3) Head-to-head goal difference; 4) Head-to-head goals scored; 5) Goal difference; 6) Goals scored; 7) Draw.

20 November 2025; 15:00	Indonesia	43–27	Malaysia	Gymnasiun Pattaya 8 School, Suphan Buri
20 November 2025; 15:00		(23–13)		Gymnasiun Pattaya 8 School, Suphan Buri
20 November 2025; 15:00		Report		Gymnasiun Pattaya 8 School, Suphan Buri

21 November 2025; 11:00	Vietnam	31–28	Indonesia	Gymnasiun Pattaya 8 School, Suphan Buri
21 November 2025; 11:00		(17–14)		Gymnasiun Pattaya 8 School, Suphan Buri
21 November 2025; 11:00		Report		Gymnasiun Pattaya 8 School, Suphan Buri

22 November 2025; 13:00	Malaysia	31–26	Vietnam	Gymnasiun Pattaya 8 School, Suphan Buri
22 November 2025; 13:00		(13–13)		Gymnasiun Pattaya 8 School, Suphan Buri
22 November 2025; 13:00		Report		Gymnasiun Pattaya 8 School, Suphan Buri

=== Fifth place game ===
21 November 2025; 13:00	Thailand	33–24	Hong Kong	Gymnasiun Pattaya 8 School, Suphan Buri
21 November 2025; 13:00		(17–12)		Gymnasiun Pattaya 8 School, Suphan Buri
21 November 2025; 13:00		Report		Gymnasiun Pattaya 8 School, Suphan Buri

== Knockout stage ==
=== Bracket ===
Semi-finals
21 November
Uzbekistan	48
Turkmenistan	26
21 November
Chinese Taipei	26
India	32

Final
22 November
Uzbekistan (ET)	55
India	53
Third place
22 November
Turkmenistan	22
Chinese Taipei	43

=== Semifinals ===
21 November 2025; 15:00	Uzbekistan	48–26	Turkmenistan	Gymnasiun Pattaya 8 School, Suphan Buri
21 November 2025; 15:00		(22–14)		Gymnasiun Pattaya 8 School, Suphan Buri
21 November 2025; 15:00		Report		Gymnasiun Pattaya 8 School, Suphan Buri

21 November 2025; 17:00	Chinese Taipei	26–32	India	Gymnasiun Pattaya 8 School, Suphan Buri
21 November 2025; 17:00		(14–16)		Gymnasiun Pattaya 8 School, Suphan Buri
21 November 2025; 17:00		Report		Gymnasiun Pattaya 8 School, Suphan Buri

=== Third place game ===
22 November 2025; 15:00	Turkmenistan	22–43	Chinese Taipei	Gymnasiun Pattaya 8 School, Suphan Buri
22 November 2025; 15:00		(13–23)		Gymnasiun Pattaya 8 School, Suphan Buri
22 November 2025; 15:00		Report		Gymnasiun Pattaya 8 School, Suphan Buri

=== Final ===
22 November 2025
19:00
Uzbekistan
55–53 (ET)
India
Gymnasiun Pattaya 8 School, Suphan Buri

(19–17)

Report

FT: 47–47 ET: 8–6

== See also ==
- 2025 Asian Women's Youth Handball Championship
- 2026 IHF Women's U18 Handball World Championship
- 2026 IHF Inter-Continental Trophy
