= 2022 Asian Women's Youth Handball Championship =

2022 handball championship in Asia

9th Asian Women's Youth Handball Championship 2022
Tournament details
- Host country: Kazakhstan
- Venue(s): 1 (in 1 host city)
- Dates: 18–25 March
- Teams: 5 (from 1 confederation)

Final positions
- Champions: Iran (1st title)
- Runner-up: Kazakhstan
- Third place: Uzbekistan
- Fourth place: India

Tournament statistics
- Matches played: 10
- Goals scored: 592 (59.2 per match)

The 2022 Asian Women's Youth Handball Championship was 9th edition of the championship held from 18 to 25 March 2022 in Almaty, Kazakhstan under the aegis of Asian Handball Federation. It was the first time in history that the championship was organised by the Kazakhstan Handball Federation. It also acted as the qualification tournament for the 2022 Women's Youth World Handball Championship, with top two teams from the championship directly qualifying for the event to be held in Georgia.

Previously the championship was scheduled to be held from 20 to 29 November 2021, but was postponed due to the spread of COVID-19 pandemic. In January 2022, the championship was further postponed from scheduled dates of 13 to 20 February due to the 2022 Kazakh unrest.

== Draw ==
The draw was held on 28 December 2021 in Almaty, Kazakhstan.

=== Seeding ===
Teams were seeded according to the AHF COC regulations and rankings of the previous edition of the championship. Teams who did not participated in the previous edition were in Pot 4.

Pot 1	Pot 2	Pot 3	Pot 4
Kazakhstan; ~~South Korea~~	Uzbekistan; ~~Chinese Taipei~~	India	Iran; ~~Kuwait~~; Syria

Chinese Taipei, Kuwait and South Korea withdrew from the tournament after the draw.

== Results ==
All times are local (UTC+6).

Pos	Team	Pld	W	D	L	GF	GA	GD	Pts	Qualification
1st place, gold medalist(s)	Iran	4	4	0	0	125	99	+26	8	2022 Youth World Championship
2nd place, silver medalist(s)	Kazakhstan (H)	4	3	0	1	110	84	+26	6	2022 Youth World Championship
3rd place, bronze medalist(s)	Uzbekistan	4	2	0	2	145	144	+1	4	
4	India	4	1	0	3	123	123	0	2	
5	Syria	4	0	0	4	89	142	−53	0	

Source: AHF
Rules for classification: 1) points; 2) head-to-head points; 3) head-to-head goal difference; 4) head-to-head number of goals scored; 5) goal difference.
(H) Hosts

18 March 2022; 15:00	Iran	44–35	Uzbekistan	Universal sports complex Dostyk, Almaty
18 March 2022; 15:00		(20–15)		Universal sports complex Dostyk, Almaty

20 March 2022; 15:00	India	41–44	Uzbekistan	Universal sports complex Dostyk, Almaty
20 March 2022; 15:00		(19–23)		Universal sports complex Dostyk, Almaty

20 March 2022; 17:00	Iran	20–19	Kazakhstan	Universal sports complex Dostyk, Almaty
20 March 2022; 17:00		(10–10)		Universal sports complex Dostyk, Almaty

21 March 2022; 15:00	India	24–25	Iran	Universal sports complex Dostyk, Almaty
21 March 2022; 15:00		(15–13)		Universal sports complex Dostyk, Almaty

21 March 2022; 17:00	Uzbekistan	37–28	Syria	Universal sports complex Dostyk, Almaty
21 March 2022; 17:00		(17–16)		Universal sports complex Dostyk, Almaty

22 March 2022; 17:00	Syria	14–32	Kazakhstan	Universal sports complex Dostyk, Almaty
22 March 2022; 17:00		(6–14)		Universal sports complex Dostyk, Almaty

23 March 2022; 15:00	Syria	21–36	Iran	Universal sports complex Dostyk, Almaty
23 March 2022; 15:00		(8–17)		Universal sports complex Dostyk, Almaty

23 March 2022; 17:00	India	21–28	Kazakhstan	Universal sports complex Dostyk, Almaty
23 March 2022; 17:00		(9–17)		Universal sports complex Dostyk, Almaty

25 March 2022; 15:00	Syria	26–37	India	Universal sports complex Dostyk, Almaty
25 March 2022; 15:00		(8–18)		Universal sports complex Dostyk, Almaty

25 March 2022; 17:00	Kazakhstan	31–29	Uzbekistan	Universal sports complex Dostyk, Almaty
25 March 2022; 17:00		(17–14)		Universal sports complex Dostyk, Almaty
