= Jung Ji-in =

South Korean handball player (born 2000)

Personal information
- Nationality: South Korean
- Born: 18 July 2000 (age 26) Busan, South Korea
- Height: 1.80 m (5 ft 11 in)

Sport
- Sport: Handball
- Position: Right wing
- Current club: Colorful Daegu

Senior clubs
- Years: Team
- -2018: Baekyang HS
- 2019-2022: Korea National Sport University
- 2023-2024: Kumamoto Beaust Pindys
- 2024-: Colorful Daegu
National team
| Years | Team | Apps | (Gls) |
| – | South Korea | 14 | (17) |
Medal record
Junior World Championship
| Bronze medal – third place | 2018 Hungary |
Asian Championship
| Gold medal – first place | 2021 Jordan |
| Gold medal – first place | 2022 South Korea |
| Silver medal – second place | 2024 India |
Asian Youth Championship
| Gold medal – first place | 2017 Indonesia |

Jung Ji-in (Korean: 정지인; born 18 July 2000) is a South Korean handball player for the Colorful Daegu and the South Korean national team.

== Career ==
Jung began playing handball at the age of 10 and first garnered attention in 2017 when she was selected for the South Korean under-18 national team and won gold at the Asian Youth Championship. In December 2017 Jung participated in the 2017 IHF World Handball Championship at the age of 17, as the youngest member of the South Korean squad.

In 2018 Jung took part in the 2018 IHF Junior World Handball Championship and achieved bronze medal. South Korea beat Russia 29–27 and claimed the bronze medal in Hungary.

In 2019 Jung went on to enter Korea National Sport University without going directly to the club league. In December 2019 Jung got called-up to the South Korean national team again and competed in the 2019 IHF World Handball Championship.

In 2023 she joined Japanese team Kumamoto Beaust Pindys, where she played until 2024. She then returned to Korea and joined Colorful Daegu.
