= Basketball at the 2013 Canada Summer Games =

Basketball at the 2013 Canada Summer Games was held at the Palais de Sports, and Bishop's University John H. Price Sport Centre in Sherbrooke, Quebec.

The events will be held during the first week between August 4 and 17, 2013.

== Medal table ==
The following is the medal table for basketball at the 2013 Canada Summer Games.

* Host nation ( Quebec)

Rank	Nation	Gold	Silver	Bronze	Total
1	Ontario	2	0	0	2
2	Manitoba	0	1	1	2
3	British Columbia	0	1	0	1
4	Quebec*	0	0	1	1
Totals (4 entries)		2	2	2	6

== Medallists ==
Event	Gold	Silver	Bronze
Men's	Ontario	Manitoba	Quebec
Women's	Ontario	British Columbia	Manitoba

== Men's ==
=== Group A ===
Team	W	L	PF	PA
Ontario	2	0	211	94
Nova Scotia	1	1	172	127
Northwest Territories	0	2	54	216

=== Group B ===
Team	W	L
Manitoba	3	0
New Brunswick	2	1
Prince Edward Island	1	2
Alberta	0	3

=== Group C ===
Team	W	L
Quebec	3	0
Saskatchewan	2	1
Newfoundland and Labrador	1	2
British Columbia	0	3

=== Playoffs ===
Quarter-finals
August 7 — Palais des Sports
Manitoba	92
Newfoundland and Labrador	75
August 7 — Palais des Sports
Quebec	87
Nova Scotia	83
August 7 — Bishops University
New Brunswick	77
Saskatchewan	74
August 7 — Palais des Sports
Ontario	94
Prince Edward Island	45

Semi-finals
August 8 — Palais des Sports
Manitoba	82
Quebec	76
August 8 — Palais des Sports
New Brunswick	64
Ontario	75

Final
August 9 — Palais des Sports
Manitoba	49
Ontario	93
Third place
August 9 — Palais des Sports
Quebec	65
New Brunswick	57

== Women's ==
=== Group A ===
Team	W	L
Ontario	2	0
New Brunswick	1	1
Newfoundland and Labrador	0	2

=== Group B ===
Team	W	L
Saskatchewan	3	0
Manitoba	2	1
Nova Scotia	1	2
Prince Edward Island	0	3

=== Group C ===
Team	W	L
Alberta	2	0
Quebec	1	1
British Columbia	0	2

=== Playoffs ===
Quarter-finals
August 14 — Palais des Sports
Manitoba	71
Quebec	61
August 15 — Palais des Sports
Nova Scotia	33
Ontario	86
August 14 — Palais des Sports
Alberta	51
New Brunswick	46
August 15 — Palais des Sports
British Columbia	64
Saskatchewan	54

Semi-finals
August 16 — Palais des Sports
Manitoba	28
Ontario	62
August 16 — Palais des Sports
Alberta	41
British Columbia	56

Final
August 17 — Palais des Sports
Ontario	61
British Columbia	41
Third place
August 17 — Palais des Sports
Manitoba	62
Alberta	54
