= Chinese Taipei Handball Association =

Governing body of handball in Taiwan

Chinese Taipei Handball Association Chinese: 中華民國手球協會 CTHBA
- IOC nation: Chinese Taipei (TPE)
- Sport: Handball
- Other sports: Beach Handball
- Official website: www.handball.org.tw

AFFILIATIONS
- International federation: International Handball Federation (IHF)
- IHF member since: 1972
- Continental association: Asian Handball Federation
- National Olympic Committee: Chinese Taipei Olympic Committee

GOVERNING BODY
- President: Kuan Hsien-Ming (Chinese Taipei)

HEADQUARTERS
- Address: Room 710, 20, Chu-Lun Street, Taipei, Republic of China
- Country: Chinese Taipei
- Secretary General: Huang Chih-Tseng (Chinese Taipei)

The Chinese Taipei Handball Association (CTHBA; Chinese: 中華民國手球協會) is the administrative and controlling body for handball and beach handball in Republic of China. CTHBA is a member of the Asian Handball Federation (AHF) and member of the International Handball Federation (IHF) since 1972.

== National teams ==
- Chinese Taipei men's national handball team
- Chinese Taipei men's national junior handball team
- Chinese Taipei women's national handball team
- Chinese Taipei national beach handball team
- Chinese Taipei women's national beach handball team

== Competitions hosted ==
- 2009 World Games
- 2007 Asian Women's Youth Handball Championship
