= Korea Handball Federation =

South Korean handball governing body

Korea Handball Federation 대한핸드볼협회 (Korean) KHF
- IOC nation: South Korea
- Sport: Handball
- Other sports: Beach handball; Wheelchair handball
- Official website: www.handballkorea.com

HISTORY
- Year of formation: 27 July 1945; 81 years ago

AFFILIATIONS
- International federation: International Handball Federation (IHF)
- IHF member since: 1960; 66 years ago
- Continental association: Asian Handball Federation
- National Olympic Committee: Korean Sport & Olympic Committee
- Other affiliation(s): East Asian Handball Association

GOVERNING BODY
- President: Chey Tae-won
- Address: SK Olympic Handball Gymnasium, Bangi-dong, Songpa District, Seoul
- Country: South Korea

FINANCE
- Sponsors: SK Group; Naver; Molten Corporation

The Korea Handball Federation (KHF; Korean: 대한핸드볼협회) is the governing body of handball and beach handball in South Korea. KHF is affiliated to the Asian Handball Federation (AHF), Korean Sport & Olympic Committee and International Handball Federation (IHF) since 1960.

== Competitions ==
- H League

== National teams ==
- South Korea men's national handball team
- South Korea men's national junior handball team
- South Korea men's national youth handball team
- South Korea women's national handball team
- South Korea women's national junior handball team
- South Korea women's national youth handball team

== Competitions hosted ==
=== International ===
- 2010 Women's Junior World Handball Championship
- 1990 World Women's Handball Championship
- 1988 Summer Olympics
- 1985 Women's Junior World Handball Championship

=== Continental ===
- 2021 Asian Women's Handball Championship
- 2019 Asian Men's Club League Handball Championship
- 2018 Asian Men's Handball Championship
- 2017 Asian Women's Handball Championship
- 2014 Asian Games
- 2002 Asian Games
- 1995 Asian Women's Junior Handball Championship
- 1995 Asian Women's Handball Championship
- 1986 Asian Games
- 1983 Asian Men's Handball Championship
