= Indonesia Handball Association =

Governing body of handball in Indonesia

Indonesia Handball Association Indonesian: Asosiasi Bola Tangan Indonesia IHA
- IOC nation: Republic of Indonesia (INA)
- Sport: Handball
- Other sports: Beach handball
- Official website: www.indonesiahandball.or.id

HISTORY
- Year of formation: 16 August 2007; 17 years ago

AFFILIATIONS
- International federation: International Handball Federation (IHF)
- IHF member since: 2009
- Continental association: Asian Handball Federation (AHF)
- National Olympic Committee: Indonesian Olympic Committee

GOVERNING BODY
- President: Major General TNI Dody Usodo Hargosuseno

HEADQUARTERS
- Address: Hanggar Teras MBAU, JI Gatot Subroto, Kav.72, Pancoran Jakarta 10340
- Country: Indonesia
- Secretary General: Major General TNI Gadang Pambudi

The Indonesia Handball Association (Indonesian: Asosiasi Bola Tangan Indonesia) (IHA) is the administrative and controlling body for handball and beach handball in Republic of Indonesia. Founded in 2007, IHA is a member of Asian Handball Federation (AHF) and the International Handball Federation (IHF).

== National teams ==
- Indonesia men's national handball team
- Indonesia men's national junior handball team
- Indonesia women's national handball team

== Competitions hosted ==
IHA had hosted following international championships:

Championship	Venue
2018 Asian Games	Jakarta
2017 Asian Women's Youth Handball Championship	Jakarta
2015 Asian Women's Handball Championship	Jakarta
2012 Asian Women's Handball Championship	Yogyakarta
2008 Asian Beach Games	Bali
