= Ron Wilson (ice hockey, born 1956) =

Canadian ice hockey player and coach

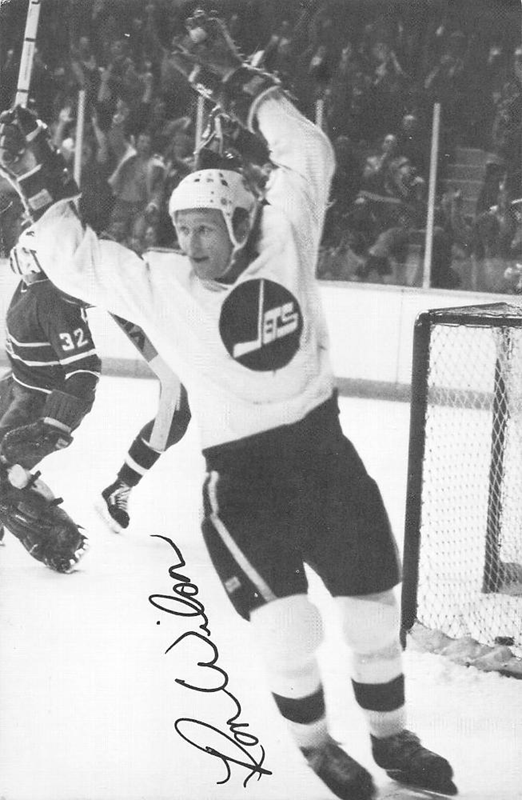
- Wilson in 1980 postcard
- Born: May 13, 1956 (age 70) Toronto, Ontario, Canada
- Height: 5 ft 9 in (175 cm)
- Weight: 180 lb (82 kg; 12 st 12 lb)
- Position: Centre
- Shot: Left
- Played for: Winnipeg Jets; St. Louis Blues; Montreal Canadiens
- NHL draft: 133rd overall, 1976; Montreal Canadiens
- Playing career: 1976–1996

Ronald Lee Wilson (born May 13, 1956) is a Canadian former professional ice hockey centreman and current assistant coach with the Hamilton Bulldogs of the Ontario Hockey League. Wilson's professional playing career spans twenty seasons, including fourteen in the National Hockey League. Following his retirement, he turned to coaching and held assistant and head coach positions for various American Hockey League teams. On August 9, 2011, the Montreal Canadiens announced that they had hired Wilson as the assistant to the Hamilton Bulldogs' coach Clément Jodoin.

== Early life ==
Wilson was born in Toronto and played junior hockey in the Ontario Hockey Association with the Toronto Marlboros, Hamilton Red Wings and St. Catharines Black Hawks. He also played three stints with the Markham Waxers during his time with the OHA.

== Career ==
=== Playing ===
Wilson was drafted 133rd overall by the Montreal Canadiens in the 1976 NHL Amateur Draft and started playing for the Canadiens' American Hockey League affiliate, the Nova Scotia Voyageurs. After three seasons with the team, Wilson was traded to the Winnipeg Jets who had just joined the National Hockey League following the NHL–WHA merger. He made the team and played nine seasons in Winnipeg with minor league stints with the Tulsa Oilers and Sherbrooke Jets. Wilson spent the entire 1988–89 season and part of the 1989–90 season with the Moncton Hawks (the Jets minor league affiliate) before being traded to the St. Louis Blues for Doug Evans. He spent four seasons with the Blues before signing as a free agent with the Montreal Canadiens. Wilson's season in Montreal was his last in the NHL but he played two more years in the International Hockey League (Detroit Vipers and San Diego Gulls) and the East Coast Hockey League (Wheeling Thunderbirds). In total, Wilson played 832 NHL games over fourteen seasons, scoring 110 goals and 216 assists for 326 points and amassing 415 penalty minutes.

=== Coaching ===
Wilson retired as a player after the 1995–96 season and took an assistant coach position with the AHL Springfield Falcons the following season. After four seasons with the Falcons, he joined the Saint John Flames as the assistant to Jim Playfair. During the 2002–03 season, Playfair was promoted to the assistant coach position for the Calgary Flames and Wilson became the Saint John Flames' head coach. The team disbanded at the end of the season and Wilson became an assistant coach with the Hamilton Bulldogs and coached for five seasons. In 2008–09, Wilson was named head coach when Don Lever promoted to the assistant coach position for the Montreal Canadiens after the firing of Guy Carbonneau. His contract was not renewed and Guy Boucher took over as head coach. Wilson accepted an assistant coaching position with the Chicago Wolves, after Don Lever obtained the head coaching position, at the early stages of the 2009–10 season. After two years with the Wolves, both Wilson and Lever lost their job following the relocation of the Atlanta Thrashers to Winnipeg. On August 9, 2011, the Canadiens announced that they had hired him as the assistant to new Bulldogs coach Clément Jodoin.

Over the course of his career, Wilson won three Calder Cups, one as a player with the Nova Scotia Voyageurs and two as a coach, one with the Saint John Flames and one with the Hamilton Bulldogs.

== Career statistics ==
=== Regular season and playoffs ===
| | | | Regular season | | | | | Playoffs |
| Season | Team | League | GP | G | A | Pts | PIM | GP | G | A | Pts | PIM |
|---|---|---|---|---|---|---|---|---|---|---|---|---|
| 1972–73 | Toronto Marlboros | OHA | 21 | 1 | 11 | 12 | 2 | — | — | — | — | — |
| 1972–73 | Markham Waxers | MTJHL | — | — | — | — | — | — | — | — | — | — |
| 1973–74 | Hamilton Red Wings | OHA | 6 | 1 | 0 | 1 | 2 | — | — | — | — | — |
| 1973–74 | Markham Waxers | OPJHL | — | — | — | — | — | — | — | — | — | — |
| 1974–75 | Markham Waxers | OPJHL | 43 | 26 | 28 | 54 | 24 | — | — | — | — | — |
| 1974–75 | Toronto Marlboros | OMJHL | 16 | 6 | 12 | 18 | 6 | 23 | 9 | 17 | 26 | 6 |
| 1974–75 | Toronto Marlboros | M-Cup | — | — | — | — | — | 4 | 0 | 3 | 3 | 2 |
| 1975–76 | St. Catharines Black Hawks | OMJHL | 64 | 37 | 62 | 99 | 44 | 4 | 1 | 6 | 7 | 7 |
| 1976–77 | Nova Scotia Voyageurs | AHL | 67 | 15 | 21 | 36 | 18 | 6 | 0 | 0 | 0 | 0 |
| 1977–78 | Nova Scotia Voyageurs | AHL | 59 | 15 | 25 | 40 | 17 | 11 | 4 | 4 | 8 | 9 |
| 1978–79 | Nova Scotia Voyageurs | AHL | 77 | 33 | 42 | 75 | 91 | 10 | 5 | 6 | 11 | 14 |
| 1979–80 | Winnipeg Jets | NHL | 79 | 21 | 36 | 57 | 28 | — | — | — | — | — |
| 1980–81 | Winnipeg Jets | NHL | 77 | 18 | 33 | 51 | 55 | — | — | — | — | — |
| 1981–82 | Winnipeg Jets | NHL | 39 | 3 | 13 | 16 | 49 | — | — | — | — | — |
| 1981–82 | Tulsa Oilers | CHL | 41 | 20 | 38 | 58 | 22 | 3 | 1 | 0 | 1 | 2 |
| 1982–83 | Winnipeg Jets | NHL | 12 | 6 | 3 | 9 | 4 | 3 | 2 | 2 | 4 | 2 |
| 1982–83 | Sherbrooke Jets | AHL | 65 | 30 | 55 | 85 | 71 | — | — | — | — | — |
| 1983–84 | Winnipeg Jets | NHL | 51 | 3 | 12 | 15 | 12 | — | — | — | — | — |
| 1983–84 | Sherbrooke Jets | AHL | 22 | 10 | 30 | 40 | 16 | — | — | — | — | — |
| 1984–85 | Winnipeg Jets | NHL | 75 | 10 | 9 | 19 | 31 | 8 | 4 | 2 | 6 | 2 |
| 1985–86 | Winnipeg Jets | NHL | 54 | 6 | 7 | 13 | 16 | 1 | 0 | 0 | 0 | 0 |
| 1985–86 | Sherbrooke Jets | AHL | 10 | 9 | 8 | 17 | 9 | — | — | — | — | — |
| 1986–87 | Winnipeg Jets | NHL | 80 | 3 | 13 | 16 | 13 | 10 | 1 | 2 | 3 | 0 |
| 1987–88 | Winnipeg Jets | NHL | 69 | 5 | 8 | 13 | 28 | 1 | 0 | 0 | 0 | 2 |
| 1988–89 | Moncton Hawks | AHL | 80 | 31 | 61 | 92 | 110 | 8 | 1 | 4 | 5 | 20 |
| 1989–90 | St. Louis Blues | NHL | 33 | 3 | 17 | 20 | 23 | 12 | 3 | 5 | 8 | 18 |
| 1989–90 | Moncton Hawks | AHL | 47 | 16 | 37 | 53 | 39 | — | — | — | — | — |
| 1990–91 | St. Louis Blues | NHL | 73 | 10 | 27 | 37 | 54 | 7 | 0 | 0 | 0 | 28 |
| 1991–92 | St. Louis Blues | NHL | 64 | 12 | 17 | 29 | 46 | 6 | 0 | 1 | 1 | 0 |
| 1992–93 | St. Louis Blues | NHL | 78 | 8 | 11 | 19 | 44 | 11 | 0 | 0 | 0 | 12 |
| 1993–94 | Montreal Canadiens | NHL | 48 | 2 | 10 | 12 | 12 | 4 | 0 | 0 | 0 | 0 |
| 1994–95 | Detroit Vipers | IHL | 12 | 6 | 9 | 15 | 10 | — | — | — | — | — |
| 1994–95 | San Diego Gulls | IHL | 58 | 8 | 25 | 33 | 60 | 5 | 2 | 0 | 2 | 8 |
| 1995–96 | Wheeling Thunderbirds | ECHL | 46 | 12 | 30 | 42 | 72 | 2 | 0 | 3 | 3 | 6 |
| NHL totals | | | 832 | 110 | 216 | 326 | 415 | 27 | 10 | 23 | 33 | 13 |
