= Sherbrooke Jets =

- City: Sherbrooke, Quebec
- League: American Hockey League
- Division: North
- Operated: 1982–1984
- Home arena: Palais des Sports
- Colours: Blue, red and white
- Affiliate: Winnipeg Jets

The Sherbrooke Jets were a minor professional ice hockey team in the American Hockey League (AHL), based in Sherbrooke, Quebec. They were a farm team of the National Hockey League's Winnipeg Jets. The team was coached by Rick Bowness in the 1982–83 AHL season and Ron Racette in 1983–84.

For their inaugural season, the team finished with a 22-54-4 record, good for only 48 points and last place in the North division. They finished a whopping 50 points behind the division-leading Fredericton Express. Dan Geoffrion, the son of Bernie Geoffrion and grandson to Howie Morenz, led the team with 37 goals, while Ron Wilson had a team-high 85 points. The team used a total of six goalies, one of which included future William M. Jennings award winner Bryan Hayward. Boston College alum Bob O'Conner would play a team-high 40 games for the team in net, winning 12 while sporting a GAA average of 4.79. The team finished second-last in the league in terms of average attendance, with a total of 2,688 fans per game. This total was only ahead of the St. Catharines Saints' total of 2,399.

Their second season was not much better, as they once again finished sixth in the North division, going 22-53-5 for 49 points. Attendance bottomed out completely with an average of 1,499 fans a game (13th out of 13 teams). Leading scorer Claude Larose returned to Sherbrooke to play pro hockey, having played there for half a season as a junior during the 1974–75 QMJHL season with the Sherbrooke Castors. He led the team with 53 goals and 120 points, won the John B. Sollenberger Trophy as the league's top point scorer, and the Fred T. Hunt Memorial Award for Sportsmanship/ Perseverance.

Major league baseball pitcher Kirk McCaskill played for the Jets in the 1983–84 season.

== Season-by-season results ==
| Season | Games | Won | Lost | Tied | Points | Goals for | Goals against | Standing | Playoffs |
|---|---|---|---|---|---|---|---|---|---|
| 1982–83 | 80 | 22 | 54 | 4 | 48 | 288 | 390 | 6th, North | Out of playoffs |
| 1983–84 | 80 | 22 | 53 | 5 | 49 | 301 | 419 | 6th, North | Out of playoffs |
