= United Arab Emirates Handball Federation =

United Arab Emirates Handball Federation UAEHF
- Sport: Handball
- Other sports: Beach handball
- Official website: www.uaehandball.net

AFFILIATIONS
- International federation: IHF
- IHF member since: 1975
- Continental association: AHF
- National Olympic Committee: United Arab Emirates National Olympic Committee

The United Arab Emirates Handball Federation (UAEHF) is an administrative body for handball and beach handball in United Arab Emirates. It is a member of the Asian Handball Federation (AHF) and the International Handball Federation (IHF) since 1975.
