= Chinese Handball Association =

Handball governing body in China

Chinese Handball Association CHA
- IOC nation: People's Republic of China (CHN)
- Sport: Handball
- Other sports: Beach handball; Wheelchair handball
- Official website: handball.sport.org.cn

HISTORY
- Year of formation: 1979; 47 years ago

AFFILIATIONS
- International federation: International Handball Federation (IHF)
- IHF member since: 1980
- Continental association: Asian Handball Federation
- National Olympic Committee: Chinese Olympic Committee
- Other affiliation(s): East Asian Handball Federation

GOVERNING BODY
- President: Mr. Lang Wei (China)

HEADQUARTERS
- Address: A39 Xingfu Street, Dongcheng District, Beijing
- Country: China
- Secretary General: Yang Chao (China)

Chinese Handball Association
- Simplified Chinese: 中国手球协会
- Traditional Chinese: 中國手球協會
Transcriptions
Standard Mandarin
- Hanyu Pinyin: Zhōngguó Shoǔqiú Xiéhuì

The Chinese Handball Association (CHA) is the governing body of handball and beach handball in the People's Republic of China. CHA is affiliated to the International Handball Federation and Asian Handball Federation. Founded in 1979, CHA is also affiliated to the Chinese Olympic Committee, East Asian Handball Federation. It is based in Beijing.

== National teams ==
- China men's national handball team
- China men's national junior handball team
- China men's national youth handball team
- China women's national handball team
- China women's national junior handball team
- China women's national youth handball team

== Competitions hosted ==
=== International ===
- 2020 Women's Youth World Handball Championship (Re-awarded to Croatia due to coronavirus pandemic)
- 2019 IHF Women's Super Globe
- 2014 Summer Youth Olympics
- 2009 World Women's Handball Championship
- 2008 Summer Olympics
- 1999 Women's Junior World Handball Championship

=== Continental ===
- 2022 Asian Games
- 2021 Asian Youth Games
- 2019 Asian Beach Handball Championship
- 2013 Asian Youth Games
- 2012 Asian Beach Games
- 2010 Asian Games
- 2006 Asian Women's Handball Championship
- 2000 Asian Women's Handball Championship
- 1996 Asian Women's Junior Handball Championship
- 1993 Asian Women's Handball Championship
- 1992 Asian Men's Junior Handball Championship
- 1992 Asian Women's Junior Handball Championship
- 1990 Asian Games
- 1990 Asian Women's Junior Handball Championship
- 1989 Asian Men's Handball Championship
- 1989 Asian Women's Handball Championship
- 1979 Asian Men's Handball Championship
