= Yang Chao (handballer) =

Chinese handball coach

Yang Chao is a Chinese handball coach and administrator.

He has previously coached the Chinese national team, where he led them at the 2015 World Women's Handball Championship.

Later he served as the General Secretary of the Chinese Handball Association.
