= Snezhana Kurgambaeva =

Kazakhstani handball player

Personal information
- Nationality: Kazakhstani
- Born: June 11, 1990 (age 36) Tolyatti, Russia
- Height: 167 cm (66 in)

Sport
- Sport: Handball
- Current club: Stavropol-SKFU

Senior clubs
- Years: Team
- 2007—2011: (Russia) HC Lada
- 2011—2012: (Kazakhstan) Akzhayik
- 2012—2014: (Kazakhstan) Astana
- 2014—2016: (Russia) Stavropol-SKFU
- 2016—2017: (Russia) HC Ufa-Alisa
- 2017—2018: (Russia) HC Kuban Krasnodar
- 2023—2025: (Russia) KSK Luch Moscow
- 2025—: (Russia) Stavropol-SKFU
National team
- Years: Team
- –: Russia (youth)
- –: Kazakhstan

Snezhana Kurgambaeva (born Snezhana Anatolyevna Makhneva on 11 June 1990) is a team handball player from Russia and Kazakhstan.

With Russia youth national team, she has won the 2008 Youth World Championship and has been awarded best right winger of the tournament.

She later plays with the Kazakhstan senior national team, and participated at the 2011 World Championship in Brazil.
