= Palais des Sports Léopold-Drolet =

Multi-purpose arena in Sherbrooke, Quebec

Coordinates: 45°24′38″N 71°53′00″W

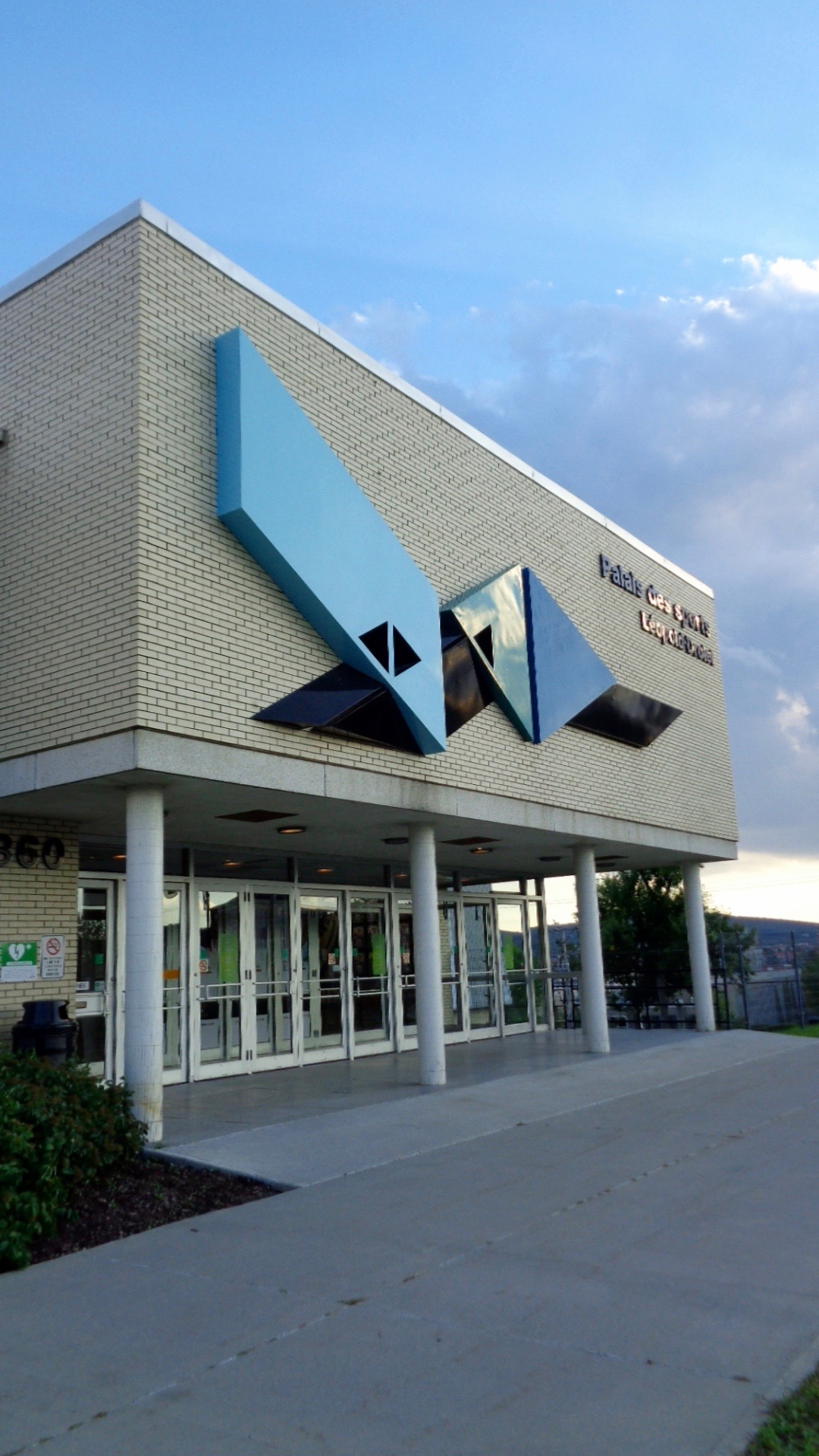
- Interactive map of Palais des Sports Léopold-Drolet
- Former names: Palais des Sports
- Location: 360, rue du Cégep; Sherbrooke, Quebec; J1E 2J9
- Owner: City of Sherbrooke
- Capacity: 3,646 (seated, hockey)
- Surface: 200' X 85'

Construction
- Opened: 1965
- Renovated: March 2012

Tenants
- Sherbrooke Castors/Faucons (QMJHL) (1969–1982; 1992–2003); Sherbrooke Jets (AHL) (1982–1984); Sherbrooke Canadiens (AHL) (1984–1990); Sherbrooke Saint-François (LNAH) (2003–2011); Sherbrooke Phoenix (QMJHL) (2012–present)

The Palais des Sports Léopold-Drolet is a 3,646-seat multi-purpose arena in Sherbrooke, Quebec, Canada. It was built in 1965. Starting in 2012, this arena was renovated and is now home to the Sherbrooke Phoenix of the QMJHL.

For the 1976 Summer Olympics in neighbouring Montreal, it hosted four women and five men's team handball matches.

It was home to the Sherbrooke Castors ice hockey team, before their move to Lewiston, Maine as the Lewiston Maineiacs in 2003. It was also home to two AHL hockey teams, the Sherbrooke Jets, and the Sherbrooke Canadiens who became the Fredericton Canadiens in 1990. With the recent folding of the Lewiston Maineiacs, Sherbrooke will be getting an expansion QMJHL team (Sherbrooke Phoenix) for the 2012–13 and the team will play at the renovated Palais De Sports. The team will be owned by a group led by former NHL goaltender Jocelyn Thibault.

It held the 2015 QMJHL Draft on June 7, 2015.
