= IHF Referee's Badge of Honour =

The Referee's Badge of Honour is awarded at three levels: bronze, silver and gold.

== Bronze Referee's Badge of Honour ==
The Referee's Badge of Honour in Bronze is awarded to all active referees who have passed an international referee course and are included in the IHF referee list.

== Silver Referee's Badge of Honour ==
The Referee's Badge of Honour in Silver is awarded to all active IHF referees who are included in the IHF list of elite referees and/or have taken part in a Men's or Women's Junior World Championship, a Men's or Women's Youth World Championship or a Beach Handball World Championship.

== Gold Referee's Badge of Honour ==
The Referee's Badge of Honour in Gold is awarded to all referees who have taken part in Olympic Games or Men's or Women's World Championships.

For all three levels, the referees, besides having the required technical qualifications, must serve as suitable role models as regards their strict neutrality and personal behaviour.

== Award ==
The award consists of the Referee's Badge of Honour in Bronze, Silver or Gold, plus a diploma and a cloth badge for the particular level.

The referee should wear the cloth badge on his/her clothing when refereeing international games.

The honouring is awarded by the Council at the recommendation of the IHF Playing Rules and Referees Commission. The Badge of Honour is presented by the PRC president or his representative.
