= 2013 Asian Women's Youth Handball Championship =

2013 handball championship in Asia

2013 Asian Youth Championship

Tournament details
- Host country: Thailand
- Venue(s): 1 (in 1 host city)
- Dates: 7–15 September 2013
- Teams: 7

Final positions
- Champions: South Korea (5th title)
- Runners-up: Japan
- Third place: Kazakhstan
- Fourth place: Uzbekistan

Tournament statistics
- Matches played: 21
- Goals scored: 1,242 (59.14 per match)

The 2013 Asian Women's Youth Handball Championship (5th tournament) took place in Bangkok, Thailand from 7 September–15 September. It acts as the Asian qualifying tournament for the 2014 Women's Youth World Handball Championship.

== Results ==
Team	Pld	W	D	L	GF	GA	GD	Pts
South Korea	6	6	0	0	253	108	+145	12
Japan	6	5	0	1	249	139	+110	10
Kazakhstan	6	4	0	2	193	178	+15	8
Uzbekistan	6	2	0	4	131	207	−76	4
China	6	2	0	4	154	195	−41	4
Thailand	6	2	0	4	131	191	−60	4
Iran	6	0	0	6	131	224	−93	0

7 September 2013; 13:00	Japan	49–15	Iran	Indoor Stadium Huamark, Bangkok
7 September 2013; 13:00		(23–8)		Indoor Stadium Huamark, Bangkok

7 September 2013; 15:00	Kazakhstan	19–41	South Korea	Indoor Stadium Huamark, Bangkok
7 September 2013; 15:00		(8–20)		Indoor Stadium Huamark, Bangkok

7 September 2013; 18:00	Thailand	24–21	Uzbekistan	Indoor Stadium Huamark, Bangkok
7 September 2013; 18:00		(15–9)		Indoor Stadium Huamark, Bangkok

8 September 2013; 13:00	Kazakhstan	34–21	Uzbekistan	Indoor Stadium Huamark, Bangkok
8 September 2013; 13:00		(14–10)		Indoor Stadium Huamark, Bangkok

8 September 2013; 15:00	Japan	42–22	Thailand	Indoor Stadium Huamark, Bangkok
8 September 2013; 15:00		(23–11)		Indoor Stadium Huamark, Bangkok

8 September 2013; 17:00	Iran	27–38	China	Indoor Stadium Huamark, Bangkok
8 September 2013; 17:00		(13–21)		Indoor Stadium Huamark, Bangkok

9 September 2013; 13:00	South Korea	49–16	Uzbekistan	Indoor Stadium Huamark, Bangkok
9 September 2013; 13:00		(15–7)		Indoor Stadium Huamark, Bangkok

9 September 2013; 15:00	Thailand	19–23	China	Indoor Stadium Huamark, Bangkok
9 September 2013; 15:00		(9–9)		Indoor Stadium Huamark, Bangkok

9 September 2013; 17:00	Japan	39–34	Kazakhstan	Indoor Stadium Huamark, Bangkok
9 September 2013; 17:00		(22–18)		Indoor Stadium Huamark, Bangkok

11 September 2013; 13:00	Thailand	22–32	Kazakhstan	Indoor Stadium Huamark, Bangkok
11 September 2013; 13:00		(10–14)		Indoor Stadium Huamark, Bangkok

11 September 2013; 15:00	China	15–35	South Korea	Indoor Stadium Huamark, Bangkok
11 September 2013; 15:00		(9–20)		Indoor Stadium Huamark, Bangkok

11 September 2013; 17:00	Uzbekistan	33–24	Iran	Indoor Stadium Huamark, Bangkok
11 September 2013; 17:00		(19–14)		Indoor Stadium Huamark, Bangkok

12 September 2013; 13:00	Iran	14–39	South Korea	Indoor Stadium Huamark, Bangkok
12 September 2013; 13:00		(6–17)		Indoor Stadium Huamark, Bangkok

12 September 2013; 15:00	Uzbekistan	7–47	Japan	Indoor Stadium Huamark, Bangkok
12 September 2013; 15:00		(5–21)		Indoor Stadium Huamark, Bangkok

12 September 2013; 17:00	China	27–38	Kazakhstan	Indoor Stadium Huamark, Bangkok
12 September 2013; 17:00		(10–16)		Indoor Stadium Huamark, Bangkok

14 September 2013; 13:00	China	22–43	Japan	Indoor Stadium Huamark, Bangkok
14 September 2013; 13:00		(12–25)		Indoor Stadium Huamark, Bangkok

14 September 2013; 15:00	Kazakhstan	36–28	Iran	Indoor Stadium Huamark, Bangkok
14 September 2013; 15:00		(20–14)		Indoor Stadium Huamark, Bangkok

14 September 2013; 17:00	South Korea	50–15	Thailand	Indoor Stadium Huamark, Bangkok
14 September 2013; 17:00		(28–7)		Indoor Stadium Huamark, Bangkok

15 September 2013; 13:00	Uzbekistan	33–29	China	Indoor Stadium Huamark, Bangkok
15 September 2013; 13:00		(20–13)		Indoor Stadium Huamark, Bangkok

15 September 2013; 15:00	Iran	23–29	Thailand	Indoor Stadium Huamark, Bangkok
15 September 2013; 15:00		(10–15)		Indoor Stadium Huamark, Bangkok

15 September 2013; 17:00	South Korea	39–29	Japan	Indoor Stadium Huamark, Bangkok
15 September 2013; 17:00		(22–14)		Indoor Stadium Huamark, Bangkok

== Final standing ==
Rank	Team
1st place, gold medalist(s)	South Korea
2nd place, silver medalist(s)	Japan
3rd place, bronze medalist(s)	Kazakhstan
4	Uzbekistan
5	China
6	Thailand
7	Iran

Team qualified for the 2014 Youth World Championship
