= 2005 Asian Women's Youth Handball Championship =

2005 handball championship in Asia

2005 Asian Youth Championship
Tournament details
- Host country: Thailand
- Venue: 1 (in 1 host city)
- Dates: 26 June – 1 July 2005
- Teams: 5

Final positions
- Champions: South Korea (1st title)
- Runners-up: Japan
- Third place: Thailand
- Fourth place: Chinese Taipei

Tournament statistics
- Matches played: 10
- Goals scored: 531 (53.1 per match)

The 2005 Asian Women's Youth Handball Championship (1st tournament) took place in Bangkok from 26 June–1 July. It acts as the Asian qualifying tournament for the 2006 Women's Youth World Handball Championship in Canada.

== Results ==
Team	Pld	W	D	L	GF	GA	GD	Pts
South Korea	4	4	0	0	144	88	+56	8
Japan	4	3	0	1	135	96	+39	6
Thailand	4	1	1	2	94	94	0	3
Chinese Taipei	4	1	1	2	86	105	−19	3
India	4	0	0	4	72	148	−76	0

26 June 2005; 10:20	Thailand	29–15	India	Nimibutr Stadium, Bangkok
26 June 2005; 10:20		(12–6)		Nimibutr Stadium, Bangkok

26 June 2005; 15:30	South Korea	30–20	Chinese Taipei	Nimibutr Stadium, Bangkok
26 June 2005; 15:30		(18–12)		Nimibutr Stadium, Bangkok

27 June 2005; 12:30	Japan	29–17	Chinese Taipei	Nimibutr Stadium, Bangkok
27 June 2005; 12:30		(15–11)		Nimibutr Stadium, Bangkok

27 June 2005; 15:30	South Korea	29–20	Thailand	Nimibutr Stadium, Bangkok
27 June 2005; 15:30		(12–8)		Nimibutr Stadium, Bangkok

28 June 2005; 12:30	Japan	43–14	India	Nimibutr Stadium, Bangkok
28 June 2005; 12:30		(21–7)		Nimibutr Stadium, Bangkok

29 June 2005; 15:00	South Korea	46–16	India	Nimibutr Stadium, Bangkok

29 June 2005; 16:30	Thailand	19–19	Chinese Taipei	Nimibutr Stadium, Bangkok

30 June 2005; 18:00	Japan	31–26	Thailand	Nimibutr Stadium, Bangkok
30 June 2005; 18:00		(19–10)		Nimibutr Stadium, Bangkok

1 July 2005; 14:00	Chinese Taipei	30–27	India	Nimibutr Stadium, Bangkok

1 July 2005; 15:30	Japan	32–39	South Korea	Nimibutr Stadium, Bangkok
1 July 2005; 15:30		(15–17)		Nimibutr Stadium, Bangkok

== Final standing ==
Rank	Team
1st place, gold medalist(s)	South Korea
2nd place, silver medalist(s)	Japan
3rd place, bronze medalist(s)	Thailand
4	Chinese Taipei
5	India

Team qualified for the 2006 Youth World Championship
