= Handball Federation of Uzbekistan =

Governing body of handball in Uzbekistan

Handball Federation of Uzbekistan Uzbek: O'zbekiston Gandbol Federatsiyasi HFU
- IOC nation: Republic of Uzbekistan (UZB)
- Sport: Handball
- Other sports: Beach handball

HISTORY
- Year of formation: 1991; 34 years ago

AFFILIATIONS
- International federation: International Handball Federation (IHF)
- IHF member since: 1992
- Continental association: Asian Handball Federation
- National Olympic Committee: National Olympic Committee of the Republic of Uzbekistan

GOVERNING BODY
- President: Musaev Omondjan M

HEADQUARTERS
- Address: Str. Mirabad 35, 100174 Tashkent
- Country: Uzbekistan
- Secretary General: Mathalikov Ismail Ikramovich

The Handball Federation of Uzbekistan (Uzbek: O'zbekiston Gandbol Federatsiyasi) (HFU) is the administrative and controlling body for handball and beach handball in the Republic of Uzbekistan. Founded in 1991, HFU is a member of Asian Handball Federation (AHF) and the International Handball Federation (IHF).

== National teams ==
- Uzbekistan men's national handball team
- Uzbekistan men's national junior handball team
- Uzbekistan women's national handball team
