= 2007 Asian Women's Youth Handball Championship =

2007 handball championship in Asia

2007 Asian Youth Championship
Tournament details
- Host country: Taiwan
- Venue(s): 1 (in 1 host city)
- Dates: 23–28 July 2007
- Teams: 5

Final positions
- Champions: South Korea (2nd title)
- Runners-up: Japan
- Third place: Chinese Taipei
- Fourth place: Hong Kong

Tournament statistics
- Matches played: 10
- Goals scored: 491 (49.1 per match)

The 2007 Asian Women's Youth Handball Championship (2nd tournament) took place in Taipei from 23 July–28 July. It acts as the Asian qualifying tournament for the 2008 Women's Youth World Handball Championship in Slovakia.

== Results ==
Team	Pld	W	D	L	GF	GA	GD	Pts
South Korea	4	4	0	0	175	59	+116	8
Japan	4	3	0	1	127	72	+55	6
Chinese Taipei	4	2	0	2	121	77	+44	4
Hong Kong	4	1	0	3	47	118	−71	2
Qatar	4	0	0	4	21	165	−144	0

23 July 2007; 15:00	South Korea	36–28	Japan	Ban Chao Gymnasium, Taipei
23 July 2007; 15:00		(16–18)		Ban Chao Gymnasium, Taipei

23 July 2007; 17:00	Chinese Taipei	32–11	Hong Kong	Ban Chao Gymnasium, Taipei
23 July 2007; 17:00		(18–5)		Ban Chao Gymnasium, Taipei

24 July 2007; 15:00	South Korea	45–9	Hong Kong	Ban Chao Gymnasium, Taipei
24 July 2007; 15:00		(18–5)		Ban Chao Gymnasium, Taipei

24 July 2007; 17:00	Japan	41–5	Qatar	Ban Chao Gymnasium, Taipei
24 July 2007; 17:00		(19–2)		Ban Chao Gymnasium, Taipei

25 July 2007; 17:00	Chinese Taipei	44–7	Qatar	Ban Chao Gymnasium, Taipei
25 July 2007; 17:00		(22–2)		Ban Chao Gymnasium, Taipei

26 July 2007; 15:00	South Korea	60–1	Qatar	Ban Chao Gymnasium, Taipei
26 July 2007; 15:00		(29–1)		Ban Chao Gymnasium, Taipei

26 July 2007; 17:00	Japan	33–7	Hong Kong	Ban Chao Gymnasium, Taipei
26 July 2007; 17:00		(18–2)		Ban Chao Gymnasium, Taipei

27 July 2007; 17:00	Chinese Taipei	24–25	Japan	Ban Chao Gymnasium, Taipei
27 July 2007; 17:00		(13–10)		Ban Chao Gymnasium, Taipei

28 July 2007; 14:30	Hong Kong	20–8	Qatar	Ban Chao Gymnasium, Taipei
28 July 2007; 14:30		(12–4)		Ban Chao Gymnasium, Taipei

28 July 2007; 16:30	South Korea	34–21	Chinese Taipei	Ban Chao Gymnasium, Taipei
28 July 2007; 16:30		(15–12)		Ban Chao Gymnasium, Taipei

== Final standing ==
Rank	Team
1st place, gold medalist(s)	South Korea
2nd place, silver medalist(s)	Japan
3rd place, bronze medalist(s)	Chinese Taipei
4	Hong Kong
5	Qatar

Team qualified for the 2008 Youth World Championship

== See also ==
- List of sporting events in Taiwan
