= 2011 Asian Women's Youth Handball Championship =

2011 handball championship in Asia

2011 Asian Youth Championship
Tournament details
- Host country: Japan
- Venue(s): 1 (in 1 host city)
- Dates: 23–28 September 2011
- Teams: 5

Final positions
- Champions: South Korea (4th title)
- Runners-up: Japan
- Third place: Kazakhstan
- Fourth place: Iran

Tournament statistics
- Matches played: 10
- Goals scored: 600 (60 per match)

The 2011 Asian Women's Youth Handball Championship (4th tournament) took place in Yamaga, Japan from 23 September–28 September. It acts as the Asian qualifying tournament for the 2012 Women's Youth World Handball Championship.

== Results ==
Team	Pld	W	D	L	GF	GA	GD	Pts
South Korea	4	4	0	0	157	75	+82	8
Japan	4	3	0	1	137	81	+56	6
Kazakhstan	4	2	0	2	144	134	+10	4
Iran	4	1	0	3	120	135	−15	2
Qatar	4	0	0	4	42	175	−133	0

23 September 2011; 14:00	Japan	41–10	Qatar	Yamaga
23 September 2011; 14:00		(21–2)		Yamaga

23 September 2011; 16:00	Kazakhstan	48–33	Iran	Yamaga
23 September 2011; 16:00		(25–15)		Yamaga

24 September 2011; 14:00	Japan	40–28	Kazakhstan	Yamaga
24 September 2011; 14:00		(19–18)		Yamaga

24 September 2011; 16:00	South Korea	40–19	Iran	Yamaga
24 September 2011; 16:00		(19–9)		Yamaga

25 September 2011; 16:00	South Korea	43–7	Qatar	Yamaga
25 September 2011; 16:00		(23–2)		Yamaga

26 September 2011; 14:00	Japan	36–16	Iran	Yamaga
26 September 2011; 14:00		(22–9)		Yamaga

26 September 2011; 16:00	Kazakhstan	39–14	Qatar	Yamaga
26 September 2011; 16:00		(20–5)		Yamaga

27 September 2011; 16:00	South Korea	47–29	Kazakhstan	Yamaga
27 September 2011; 16:00		(24–18)		Yamaga

28 September 2011; 14:00	Iran	52–11	Qatar	Yamaga
28 September 2011; 14:00		(21–4)		Yamaga

28 September 2011; 16:00	Japan	20–27	South Korea	Yamaga
28 September 2011; 16:00		(9–12)		Yamaga

== Final standing ==
Rank	Team
1st place, gold medalist(s)	South Korea
2nd place, silver medalist(s)	Japan
3rd place, bronze medalist(s)	Kazakhstan
4	Iran
5	Qatar

Team qualified for the 2012 Youth World Championship
