= 2017 Asian Women's Youth Handball Championship =

2017 handball championship in Asia

Tournament details
- Host country: Indonesia
- Venue: 1 (in 1 host city)
- Dates: 20–28 August 2017
- Teams: 7 (from 1 confederation)

Final positions
- Champions: South Korea (7th title)
- Runners-up: Japan
- Third place: China
- Fourth place: Kazakhstan

Tournament statistics
- Matches played: 21
- Goals scored: 1,155 (55 per match)

The 2017 Asian Women's Youth Handball Championship was the 7th edition of the championship organised by the Indonesia Handball Association under the auspices of the Asian Handball Federation. It was held in Jakarta (Indonesia) from 20 to 28 August 2017 and was played by under-17 years players. It was the first time that Indonesia staged the competition. It also acts as qualification tournament for the IHF Women's Youth World Handball Championship. Top four teams will qualify for the 2018 Women's Youth World Handball Championship to be held in Poland.

== Participating teams ==
1. Indonesia (Host)
2. South Korea (Defending Champion)
3. Japan
4. China
5. Kazakhstan
6. Uzbekistan
7. Hong Kong

== Round-robin ==
Team	Pld	W	D	L	GF	GA	GD	Pts
South Korea	6	6	0	0	274	88	+186	12
Japan	6	5	0	1	215	100	+115	10
China	6	4	0	2	182	143	+39	8
Kazakhstan	6	2	1	3	171	170	+1	5
Uzbekistan	6	2	1	3	170	186	−16	5
Hong Kong	6	1	0	5	71	179	−108	2
Indonesia	6	0	0	6	72	289	−217	0

== Match results ==
20 August 2017; 14:00	Indonesia	15–24	Hong Kong	POPKI Sports Hall, Jakarta, Indonesia
20 August 2017; 14:00		(9–14)		POPKI Sports Hall, Jakarta, Indonesia

20 August 2017; 16:00	Japan	31–21	China	POPKI Sports Hall, Jakarta, Indonesia
20 August 2017; 16:00		(16–10)		POPKI Sports Hall, Jakarta, Indonesia

20 August 2017; 19:00	Kazakhstan	16–49	South Korea	POPKI Sports Hall, Jakarta, Indonesia
20 August 2017; 19:00		(6–25)		POPKI Sports Hall, Jakarta, Indonesia
20 August 2017; 19:00		Report		POPKI Sports Hall, Jakarta, Indonesia

21 August 2017; 15:00	Uzbekistan	29–29	Kazakhstan	POPKI Sports Hall, Jakarta, Indonesia
21 August 2017; 15:00		(15–16)		POPKI Sports Hall, Jakarta, Indonesia

21 August 2017; 17:00	China	29–9	Hong Kong	POPKI Sports Hall, Jakarta, Indonesia
21 August 2017; 17:00		(11–6)		POPKI Sports Hall, Jakarta, Indonesia

21 August 2017; 19:00	Indonesia	11–60	South Korea	POPKI Sports Hall, Jakarta, Indonesia
21 August 2017; 19:00		(4–27)		POPKI Sports Hall, Jakarta, Indonesia
21 August 2017; 19:00		Report		POPKI Sports Hall, Jakarta, Indonesia

22 August 2017; 15:00	Japan	41–18	Uzbekistan	POPKI Sports Hall, Jakarta, Indonesia
22 August 2017; 15:00		(21–12)		POPKI Sports Hall, Jakarta, Indonesia

22 August 2017; 17:00	South Korea	40–7	Hong Kong	POPKI Sports Hall, Jakarta, Indonesia
22 August 2017; 17:00		(19–4)		POPKI Sports Hall, Jakarta, Indonesia
22 August 2017; 17:00		Report		POPKI Sports Hall, Jakarta, Indonesia

22 August 2017; 19:00	China	36–24	Kazakhstan	POPKI Sports Hall, Jakarta, Indonesia
22 August 2017; 19:00		(21–10)		POPKI Sports Hall, Jakarta, Indonesia

24 August 2017; 15:00	Uzbekistan	16–49	South Korea	POPKI Sports Hall, Jakarta, Indonesia
24 August 2017; 15:00		(10–24)		POPKI Sports Hall, Jakarta, Indonesia

24 August 2017; 17:00	China	42–12	Indonesia	POPKI Sports Hall, Jakarta, Indonesia
24 August 2017; 17:00		(21–5)		POPKI Sports Hall, Jakarta, Indonesia

24 August 2017; 19:00	Kazakhstan	19–30	Japan	POPKI Sports Hall, Jakarta, Indonesia
24 August 2017; 19:00		(10–12)		POPKI Sports Hall, Jakarta, Indonesia

25 August 2017; 15:00	Hong Kong	19–20	Uzbekistan	POPKI Sports Hall, Jakarta, Indonesia
25 August 2017; 15:00		(7–10)		POPKI Sports Hall, Jakarta, Indonesia

25 August 2017; 17:00	Japan	58–4	Indonesia	POPKI Sports Hall, Jakarta, Indonesia
25 August 2017; 17:00		(30–3)		POPKI Sports Hall, Jakarta, Indonesia

25 August 2017; 19:00	South Korea	42–18	China	POPKI Sports Hall, Jakarta, Indonesia
25 August 2017; 19:00		(19–9)		POPKI Sports Hall, Jakarta, Indonesia
25 August 2017; 19:00		Report		POPKI Sports Hall, Jakarta, Indonesia

27 August 2017; 15:00	Hong Kong	4–35	Japan	POPKI Sports Hall, Jakarta, Indonesia
27 August 2017; 15:00		(2–17)		POPKI Sports Hall, Jakarta, Indonesia

27 August 2017; 17:00	Kazakhstan	43–18	Indonesia	POPKI Sports Hall, Jakarta, Indonesia
27 August 2017; 17:00		(20–9)		POPKI Sports Hall, Jakarta, Indonesia

27 August 2017; 19:00	Uzbekistan	25–36	China	POPKI Sports Hall, Jakarta, Indonesia
27 August 2017; 19:00		(11–16)		POPKI Sports Hall, Jakarta, Indonesia

28 August 2017; 14:00	Indonesia	12–62	Uzbekistan	POPKI Sports Hall, Jakarta, Indonesia
28 August 2017; 14:00		(9–28)		POPKI Sports Hall, Jakarta, Indonesia

28 August 2017; 16:00	Hong Kong	8–40	Kazakhstan	POPKI Sports Hall, Jakarta, Indonesia
28 August 2017; 16:00		(4–22)		POPKI Sports Hall, Jakarta, Indonesia

28 August 2017; 18:00	South Korea	34–20	Japan	POPKI Sports Hall, Jakarta, Indonesia
28 August 2017; 18:00		(17–7)		POPKI Sports Hall, Jakarta, Indonesia
28 August 2017; 18:00		Report		POPKI Sports Hall, Jakarta, Indonesia

== Final standings ==
Rank	Team
1st place, gold medalist(s)	South Korea
2nd place, silver medalist(s)	Japan
3rd place, bronze medalist(s)	China
4	Kazakhstan
5	Uzbekistan
6	Hong Kong
7	Indonesia

Team qualified for the 2018 Women's Youth World Handball Championship
