= 2009 Asian Women's Youth Handball Championship =

2009 handball championship in Asia

2009 Asian Youth Championship
Tournament details
- Host country: Jordan
- Venue(s): 1 (in 1 host city)
- Dates: 4–9 July 2009
- Teams: 5

Final positions
- Champions: South Korea (3rd title)
- Runners-up: Japan
- Third place: Kazakhstan
- Fourth place: Thailand

Tournament statistics
- Matches played: 10
- Goals scored: 559 (55.9 per match)

The 2009 Asian Women's Youth Handball Championship (3rd tournament) took place in Amman from 4 July–9 July. It acts as the Asian qualifying tournament for the 2010 Youth Summer Olympics in Singapore and the 2010 Women's Youth World Handball Championship.

== Results ==
Team	Pld	W	D	L	GF	GA	GD	Pts
South Korea	4	4	0	0	157	87	+70	8
Japan	4	3	0	1	151	88	+63	6
Kazakhstan	4	2	0	2	110	105	+5	4
Thailand	4	1	0	3	90	135	−45	2
Jordan	4	0	0	4	51	144	−93	0

4 July 2009; 17:00	Thailand	31–16	Jordan	Prince Faisal Court, Amman
4 July 2009; 17:00		(19–7)		Prince Faisal Court, Amman

4 July 2009; 18:30	South Korea	35–27	Kazakhstan	Prince Faisal Court, Amman
4 July 2009; 18:30		(20–15)		Prince Faisal Court, Amman

5 July 2009; 17:00	Japan	45–13	Jordan	Prince Faisal Court, Amman
5 July 2009; 17:00		(19–5)		Prince Faisal Court, Amman

5 July 2009; 18:30	South Korea	46–17	Thailand	Prince Faisal Court, Amman
5 July 2009; 18:30		(22–10)		Prince Faisal Court, Amman

6 July 2009; 19:00	Japan	33–26	Kazakhstan	Prince Faisal Court, Amman
6 July 2009; 19:00		(15–13)		Prince Faisal Court, Amman

7 July 2009; 17:00	South Korea	43–11	Jordan	Prince Faisal Court, Amman
7 July 2009; 17:00		(19–4)		Prince Faisal Court, Amman

7 July 2009; 18:30	Thailand	26–32	Kazakhstan	Prince Faisal Court, Amman
7 July 2009; 18:30		(13–16)		Prince Faisal Court, Amman

8 July 2009; 18:30	Japan	41–16	Thailand	Prince Faisal Court, Amman
8 July 2009; 18:30		(18–7)		Prince Faisal Court, Amman

9 July 2009; 17:00	Jordan	11–25	Kazakhstan	Prince Faisal Court, Amman
9 July 2009; 17:00		(3–11)		Prince Faisal Court, Amman

9 July 2009; 18:30	South Korea	33–32	Japan	Prince Faisal Court, Amman
9 July 2009; 18:30		(14–18)		Prince Faisal Court, Amman

== Final standing ==
Rank	Team
1st place, gold medalist(s)	South Korea
2nd place, silver medalist(s)	Japan
3rd place, bronze medalist(s)	Kazakhstan
4	Thailand
5	Jordan

Team qualified for the 2010 Youth World Championship
