= 2008 Women's Youth World Handball Championship =

Tournament details
- Host country: Slovakia
- City: Bratislava
- Venues: 2 (in 1 host city)
- Dates: 11–20 July 2008
- Teams: 16 (from 4 confederations)

Final positions
- Champions: Russia (1st title)
- Runners-up: Serbia
- Third place: Denmark
- Fourth place: France

Tournament statistics
- Matches played: 50

The 2008 Women's Youth World Handball Championship was the 2nd edition of the tournament and took place in the Bratislava, Slovakia, from 11 to 20 July 2008.

The Russian Federation won the final against Serbia by 27–22.

== Draw ==
| Group A | Group B | Group C | Group D |
|---|---|---|---|
| Netherlands | Slovakia | Spain | France |
| Puerto Rico | Tunisia | Serbia | Angola |
| Denmark | South Korea | Japan | Brazil |
| Russia | Qatar | Argentina | Hong Kong |

== Group A ==
| Team | Pld | W | D | L | GF | GA | GD | Pts |
|---|---|---|---|---|---|---|---|---|
| Russia | 3 | 3 | 0 | 0 | 110 | 68 | +42 | 6 |
| Denmark | 3 | 2 | 0 | 1 | 102 | 73 | +29 | 4 |
| Netherlands | 3 | 1 | 0 | 2 | 81 | 78 | +3 | 2 |
| Puerto Rico | 3 | 0 | 0 | 3 | 53 | 127 | −74 | 0 |

| 11 July 2008; 14:00 | Netherlands | 35-17 | Puerto Rico | Sibamac Arena, Bratislava |
| 11 July 2008; 14:00 | | (19-8) | | Sibamac Arena, Bratislava |

| 11 July 2008; 16:00 | Russia | 33-26 | Denmark | Sibamac Arena, Bratislava |
| 11 July 2008; 16:00 | | (17-12) | | Sibamac Arena, Bratislava |

| 12 July 2008; 14:00 | Denmark | 28-23 | Netherlands | Sibamac Arena, Bratislava |
| 12 July 2008; 14:00 | | (14-14) | | Sibamac Arena, Bratislava |

| 12 July 2008; 16:00 | Puerto Rico | 19-44 | Russia | Sibamac Arena, Bratislava |
| 12 July 2008; 16:00 | | (13-14) | | Sibamac Arena, Bratislava |

| 13 July 2008; 14:00 | Netherlands | 23-33 | Russia | Sibamac Arena, Bratislava |
| 13 July 2008; 14:00 | | (11-17) | | Sibamac Arena, Bratislava |

| 13 July 2008; 16:00 | Puerto Rico | 17-48 | Denmark | Sibamac Arena, Bratislava |
| 13 July 2008; 16:00 | | (13-20) | | Sibamac Arena, Bratislava |

== Group B ==
| Team | Pld | W | D | L | GF | GA | GD | Pts |
|---|---|---|---|---|---|---|---|---|
| South Korea | 3 | 3 | 0 | 0 | 136 | 61 | +75 | 6 |
| Slovakia | 3 | 2 | 0 | 1 | 105 | 63 | +42 | 4 |
| Tunisia | 3 | 1 | 0 | 2 | 108 | 90 | +18 | 2 |
| Qatar | 3 | 0 | 0 | 3 | 33 | 168 | −135 | 0 |

| 11 July 2008; 18:00 | Slovakia | 32-23 | Tunisia | Sports Hall Pasienky, Bratislava |
| 11 July 2008; 18:00 | | (16-13) | | Sports Hall Pasienky, Bratislava |

| 11 July 2008; 20:00 | South Korea | 57-14 | Qatar | Sports Hall Pasienky, Bratislava |
| 11 July 2008; 20:00 | | (26-5) | | Sports Hall Pasienky, Bratislava |

| 12 July 2008; 18:00 | Qatar | 7-56 | Slovakia | Sports Hall Pasienky, Bratislava |
| 12 July 2008; 18:00 | | (3-25) | | Sports Hall Pasienky, Bratislava |

| 12 July 2008; 20:00 | Tunisia | 30-46 | South Korea | Sports Hall Pasienky, Bratislava |
| 12 July 2008; 20:00 | | (12-26) | | Sports Hall Pasienky, Bratislava |

| 13 July 2008; 18:00 | South Korea | 33-17 | Slovakia | Sports Hall Pasienky, Bratislava |
| 13 July 2008; 18:00 | | (23-9) | | Sports Hall Pasienky, Bratislava |

| 13 July 2008; 20:00 | Qatar | 12-55 | Tunisia | Sports Hall Pasienky, Bratislava |
| 13 July 2008; 20:00 | | (5-25) | | Sports Hall Pasienky, Bratislava |

== Group C ==
| Team | Pld | W | D | L | GF | GA | GD | Pts |
|---|---|---|---|---|---|---|---|---|
| Serbia | 3 | 3 | 0 | 0 | 93 | 67 | +26 | 6 |
| Spain | 3 | 2 | 0 | 1 | 73 | 72 | +1 | 4 |
| Argentina | 3 | 1 | 0 | 2 | 72 | 80 | −8 | 2 |
| Japan | 3 | 0 | 0 | 3 | 68 | 87 | −19 | 0 |

| 11 July 2008; 18:00 | Spain | 22-33 | Serbia | Sibamac Arena, Bratislava |
| 11 July 2008; 18:00 | | (14-12) | | Sibamac Arena, Bratislava |

| 11 July 2008; 20:00 | Japan | 26-30 | Argentina | Sibamac Arena, Bratislava |
| 11 July 2008; 20:00 | | (15-14) | | Sibamac Arena, Bratislava |

| 12 July 2008; 18:00 | Argentina | 20-28 | Spain | Sibamac Arena, Bratislava |
| 12 July 2008; 18:00 | | (10-14) | | Sibamac Arena, Bratislava |

| 12 July 2008; 20:00 | Serbia | 34-23 | Japan | Sibamac Arena, Bratislava |
| 12 July 2008; 20:00 | | (17-12) | | Sibamac Arena, Bratislava |

| 13 July 2008; 18:00 | Spain | 23-19 | Japan | Sibamac Arena, Bratislava |
| 13 July 2008; 18:00 | | (11-8) | | Sibamac Arena, Bratislava |

| 13 July 2008; 20:00 | Serbia | 26-22 | Argentina | Sibamac Arena, Bratislava |
| 13 July 2008; 20:00 | | (15-11) | | Sibamac Arena, Bratislava |

== Group D ==
| Team | Pld | W | D | L | GF | GA | GD | Pts |
|---|---|---|---|---|---|---|---|---|
| France | 3 | 3 | 0 | 0 | 110 | 34 | +76 | 6 |
| Angola | 3 | 2 | 0 | 1 | 64 | 59 | +5 | 4 |
| Brazil | 3 | 1 | 0 | 2 | 86 | 68 | +18 | 2 |
| Hong Kong | 3 | 0 | 0 | 3 | 19 | 118 | −99 | 0 |

| 11 July 2008; 14:00 | France | 27-11 | Angola | Sports Hall Pasienky, Bratislava |
| 11 July 2008; 14:00 | | (12-6) | | Sports Hall Pasienky, Bratislava |

| 11 July 2008; 16:00 | Brazil | 43-7 | Hong Kong | Sports Hall Pasienky, Bratislava |
| 11 July 2008; 16:00 | | (20-2) | | Sports Hall Pasienky, Bratislava |

| 12 July 2008; 14:00 | Hong Kong | 3-48 | France | Sports Hall Pasienky, Bratislava |
| 12 July 2008; 14:00 | | (1-23) | | Sports Hall Pasienky, Bratislava |

| 12 July 2008; 16:00 | Angola | 26-23 | Brazil | Sports Hall Pasienky, Bratislava |
| 12 July 2008; 16:00 | | (9-9) | | Sports Hall Pasienky, Bratislava |

| 13 July 2008; 14:00 | France | 35-20 | Brazil | Sports Hall Pasienky, Bratislava |
| 13 July 2008; 14:00 | | (15-9) | | Sports Hall Pasienky, Bratislava |

| 13 July 2008; 16:00 | Angola | 27-9 | Hong Kong | Sports Hall Pasienky, Bratislava |
| 13 July 2008; 16:00 | | (11-5) | | Sports Hall Pasienky, Bratislava |

== Main round ==
=== Group M I ===
| Team | Pld | W | D | L | GF | GA | GD | Pts |
|---|---|---|---|---|---|---|---|---|
| Russia | 2 | 2 | 0 | 0 | 52 | 45 | +7 | 4 |
| Denmark | 2 | 2 | 0 | 0 | 55 | 51 | +4 | 4 |
| South Korea | 2 | 0 | 0 | 2 | 51 | 59 | −8 | 0 |
| Slovakia | 2 | 0 | 0 | 2 | 37 | 48 | −11 | 0 |

| Date | Match | | | Score |
|---|---|---|---|---|
| 15 July 2008 | Russia | - | Slovakia | 23-20 |
| 15 July 2008 | South Korea | - | Denmark | 26-30 |
| 16 July 2008 | Denmark | - | Slovakia | 25-17 |
| 16 July 2008 | Russia | - | South Korea | 29-25 |

- In Sibamac Arena, Bratislava

=== Group M II ===
| Team | Pld | W | D | L | GF | GA | GD | Pts |
|---|---|---|---|---|---|---|---|---|
| Serbia | 2 | 2 | 0 | 0 | 63 | 41 | +22 | 4 |
| France | 2 | 1 | 0 | 1 | 37 | 45 | −8 | 2 |
| Spain | 2 | 1 | 0 | 1 | 40 | 37 | +3 | 2 |
| Angola | 2 | 0 | 0 | 2 | 41 | 58 | −17 | 0 |

| Date | Match | | | Score |
|---|---|---|---|---|
| 15 July 2008 | Serbia | - | Angola | 32-21 |
| 15 July 2008 | France | - | Spain | 17-14 |
| 16 July 2008 | Spain | - | Angola | 26-20 |
| 16 July 2008 | Serbia | - | France | 31-20 |

- In Sibamac Arena, Bratislava

== Placement round ==
=== Group P I ===
| Team | Pld | W | D | L | GF | GA | GD | Pts |
|---|---|---|---|---|---|---|---|---|
| Netherlands | 2 | 2 | 0 | 0 | 94 | 33 | +61 | 4 |
| Tunisia | 2 | 1 | 0 | 1 | 57 | 67 | −10 | 2 |
| Puerto Rico | 2 | 1 | 0 | 1 | 27 | 39 | −12 | 2 |
| Qatar | 2 | 0 | 0 | 2 | 15 | 99 | −84 | 0 |

| Date | Match | | | Score |
|---|---|---|---|---|
| 15 July 2008 | Netherlands | - | Qatar | 53-6 |
| 15 July 2008 | Tunisia | - | Puerto Rico | 30-26 |
| 16 July 2008 | Puerto Rico | - | Qatar | 46-9 |
| 16 July 2008 | Netherlands | - | Tunisia | 41-27 |

- In Sports Hall Pasienky, Bratislava

=== Group P II ===
| Team | Pld | W | D | L | GF | GA | GD | Pts |
|---|---|---|---|---|---|---|---|---|
| Brazil | 2 | 2 | 0 | 0 | 62 | 43 | +19 | 4 |
| Argentina | 2 | 1 | 0 | 1 | 61 | 41 | +20 | 2 |
| Japan | 2 | 1 | 0 | 1 | 62 | 41 | +21 | 2 |
| Hong Kong | 2 | 0 | 0 | 2 | 20 | 80 | −60 | 0 |

| Date | Match | | | Score |
|---|---|---|---|---|
| 15 July 2008 | Argentina | - | Hong Kong | 42-10 |
| 15 July 2008 | Brazil | - | Japan | 31-24 |
| 16 July 2008 | Japan | - | Hong Kong | 38-10 |
| 16 July 2008 | Argentina | - | Brazil | 19-31 |

- In Sports Hall Pasienky, Bratislava

== Placement matches ==
=== 15/16-place match ===
| 19 July 2008; 10:00 | Qatar | 18-34 | Hong Kong | SH Pasienky, Bratislava |

=== 13/14-place match ===
| 19 July 2008; 12:30 | Puerto Rico | 22-44 | Japan | SH Pasienky, Bratislava |

=== 11/12-place match ===
| 19 July 2008; 15:00 | Tunisia | 33-39 | Argentina | SH Pasienky, Bratislava |

=== 9/10-place match ===
| 19 July 2008; 20:00 | Netherlands | 31-26 | Brazil | SH Pasienky, Bratislava |

=== 7/8-place match ===
| 19 July 2008; 17:30 | Slovakia | 27-18 | Angola | SH Pasienky, Bratislava |

=== 5/6-place match ===
| 20 July 2008; 12:00 | South Korea | 28-31 | Spain | SH Pasienky, Bratislava |

== Semifinals / knockout stage ==
=== Semifinal matches ===
| 18 July 2008; 17:30 | Russia | 28-25 | France | Sibamac Arena, Bratislava |
| 18 July 2008; 17:30 | | (13-12) | | Sibamac Arena, Bratislava |

| 18 July 2008; 20:00 | Serbia | 28-17 | Denmark | Sibamac Arena, Bratislava |
| 18 July 2008; 20:00 | | (15-5) | | Sibamac Arena, Bratislava |

=== Bronze-medal match ===
| 20 July 2008; 14:30 | France | 21-24 | Denmark | Sibamac Arena, Bratislava; Referees: J. Ondogrecula, M. Badura (SVK) |
| 20 July 2008; 14:30 | C. Blard 12 | (10-12) | L. Grigel 9 | Sibamac Arena, Bratislava; Referees: J. Ondogrecula, M. Badura (SVK) |
| 20 July 2008; 14:30 | 2× (yellow card) 5× (suspension) | | 4× (yellow card) 2× (suspension) | Sibamac Arena, Bratislava; Referees: J. Ondogrecula, M. Badura (SVK) |

=== Gold-medal match ===
| 20 July 2008; 17:00 | Russia | 27-22 | Serbia | Sibamac Arena, Bratislava; Referees: S. Lenci, J. Grillo (ARG) |
| 20 July 2008; 17:00 | S. Makhneva 8 | (12-16) | J. Zivkovic & J. Trifunovic 6 | Sibamac Arena, Bratislava; Referees: S. Lenci, J. Grillo (ARG) |
| 20 July 2008; 17:00 | 3× (yellow card) 4× (suspension) | | 3× (yellow card) 4× (suspension) | Sibamac Arena, Bratislava; Referees: S. Lenci, J. Grillo (ARG) |

== Final standings ==
| Rank | Team |
|---|---|
| Gold medal | Russia |
| Silver medal | Serbia |
| Bronze medal | Denmark |
| 4 | France |
| 5 | Spain |
| 6 | South Korea |
| 7 | Slovakia |
| 8 | Angola |
| 9 | Netherlands |
| 10 | Brazil |
| 11 | Argentina |
| 12 | Tunisia |
| 13 | Japan |
| 14 | Puerto Rico |
| 15 | Hong Kong |
| 16 | Qatar |

== Awards ==
2008 Women's Youth World Champions

Russia
1st title

Team roster

Players - Tatiana Khmyrova, Ksenia Milova, Snezhana Makhneva, Irina Nikitina, Olga Luzinova, Anna Sen, Ksenia Makeeva, Nadezda Potapenko, Elena Konova, Irina Astashova, Ekaterina Yatsenko, Daria Mochalova, Polina Dikalo, Valentina Goncharova
Officials: A - Viacheslav Kirilenko B - Robert Minabutdinov C - Boris Krasnov D - Andrey Kalnoy
