= Asian Handball Federation =

Sports governing body in Asia

Asian Handball Federation AHF
- Sport: Handball
- Other sports: Beach handball
- Official website: www.asianhandball.org

History
- Year of formation: 26 August 1974; 52 years ago at Tehran, Imperial State of Iran

Demographics
- Membership size: 44 Members

Affiliations
- International federation: International Handball Federation (IHF)
- IHF member since: 1974
- Other affiliation(s): Olympic Council of Asia

Governance
- President: (Kuwait) Bader Mohammed Al-Theyab
- Vice-President: (Japan) Yoshihide Watanabe (First Vice President); (Jordan) Sari Hamdan Ghanima; (Bahrain) Ali Mohamed Isa Abdulla Eshaqi; (China) Wang Tao; (Iran) Alireza Pakdel

Secretariat
- Address: South Surrah, Al-Salam Area, Block 7, Street No. 705, Villa 508
- Country: Kuwait
- Secretary General: (Pakistan) Muhammad Shafiq
- Treasurer: (Kuwait) Faisal Baqer
- Official Language(s): English (Official); Arabic (Also used for correspondences)
- Number of staff: 8

Finance
- Sponsors: Al Kass Sports Channels; SK Group; Gerflor; Molten Corporation

Regions
- Western Asia; Central Asia; South Asia; Southeast Asia; East Asia

The Asian Handball Federation (AHF) is the governing body of handball and beach handball in Asia. It has 44 member countries, mostly located on the Asian continent, but excludes the transcontinental countries with territory in both Europe and Asia – Azerbaijan, Georgia, Russian Federation and Turkey – which are instead members of European Handball Federation (EHF). Three other states located along the western fringe of Asia – Cyprus, Armenia and Israel – are also EHF members. Hong Kong and Macau, although not independent countries (both are special regions of China), are also members of the AHF.

One of IHF's six continental confederations, the AHF was formed officially on 26 August 1974 in Tehran (Imperial State of Iran), on the sidelines of the 7th Asian Games 1974. The AHF headquarters is located in Kuwait City (Kuwait). Its current president is Sheikh Ahmed Al-Fahad Al-Ahmed Al-Sabah from Kuwait, who is a member of House of Al Sabah, the ruling family of Kuwait.

== History ==
When in 1976 the federation was officially founded and Sheikh Fahad Al-Ahmed Al-Jaber Al-Sabah was elected as president, the sheikh had already contributed significantly to efforts around the sport. In 1974, during the 7th Asian Games in Tehran (Iran), he applied as head of the Kuwaiti delegation at the executive committee for the inclusion of handball into the sports programme and the foundation of a continental handball federation. Handball was at that point already widely spread in Asia. The leaders of the Asian Games accepted handball as an official sport and asked the sheikh to act as interim president and to prepare the statutes of the federation. In this task he was supported by the Secretary General Syed Abul Hassan (Pakistan).

== Presidents ==
S. No.	Name	Tenure
1.	(Kuwait) Sheikh Fahad Al-Ahmed Al-Jaber Al-Sabah	26 August 1974 – 2 August 1990
Acting	(Bahrain) Mohammed Ali Abul	2 August 1990 – 1991
2.	(Kuwait) Sheikh Ahmed Al-Fahad Al-Ahmed Al-Sabah	1991 – 5 November 2021
Acting	(Japan) Yoshihide Watanabe	5 November 2021 – 20 December 2025
3.	(Kuwait) Bader Mohammed Al-Theyab	20 December 2025 – present

^1 Sheikh Fahad Al-Ahmed Al-Jaber Al-Sabah died on 2 August 1990 during the Iraqi invasion of Kuwait while defending Dasman Palace. Mohammed Ali Abul served as acting president until the war finished in 1991.
^2 Sheikh Ahmed stepped down from AHF presidency following a guilty verdict against him in a Swiss forgery trial. Therefore, 1st Vice-President Yoshihide Watanabe was appointed as acting president till further orders.

== Secretaries-general ==
S. No.	Name	Tenure
1.	(Pakistan) Syad Abul Hassan	26 August 1974 – 26 November 2000
2.	(India) Roshan Lal Anand	26 November 2000 – 25 October 2013
3.	(Pakistan) Muhammad Shafiq	25 October 2013 – present

== Executive committee ==
The following is the AHF Executive Committee for 2025 – 2029.

Designation	Name
President	(Kuwait) Bader Mohammed Al-Theyab
1st Vice-President	(Japan) Yoshihide Watanabe
Secretary General	(Pakistan) Muhammad Shafiq
Treasurer	(Kuwait) Faisal Baqer
Member	(Kazakhstan) Gulnara Turlykhanova
Member	(Qatar) Ahmed Mohamed Abdulrab Al-Shaabi

== Council ==
The following is the AHF Council for the term 2025 — 2029.

Designation	Name
President	(Kuwait) Bader Mohammed Al-Theyab
1st Vice-President	(Japan) Yoshihide Watanabe
Vice-President	(Bahrain) Ali Mohamed Isa Eshaqi
Vice-President	(Jordan) Sari Hamdan Ghanima
Vice-President	(China) Ms. Wang Tao
Vice-President	(Iran) Alireza Pakdel
Secretary General	(Pakistan) Muhammad Shafiq
Treasurer	(Kuwait) Faisal Baqer
Council Member	(Oman) Ameen Al-Barwani
Council Member	(United Arab Emirates) Mohammed Julfar
Council Member	(South Korea) Chung Hyun-kyung
Council Member	(India) Anandeshwar Panday
Council Member	(Iraq) Ahmed Riyadh Taleb
Female Council Member	(Kazakhstan) Gulnara Turlykhanova
Chairman of AHF COC	(South Korea) Kang Jae-won
Chairman of AHF PRC	(United Arab Emirates) Saleh bin Ashour
Chairman of AHF CCM	(Jordan) Taiysir Mansi
Chairman of AHF MC	(Japan) Katsuhiko Sakuma
Chairman of AHF CPP	(Saudi Arabia) Hassan bin Nasr Hilal
Chairman of AHF MKC	(Qatar) Mohammad Jaber Al-Mulla
Chairman of AHF UDC	(Uzbekistan) Ismoiljon Matkhalikov
Chairman of AHF CYSH	(Thailand) Sombat Kuruphan
Chairman of AHF AC	(Pakistan) Muhammad Amir Yousaf
Chairman of AHF EC	(Iran) Mitra Noori

== Commissions ==
The following are the AHF Commission members for the term 2025—2029.

Commission	Chairman	Members
AHF Commission of Organizing and Competition (COC)	(South Korea) Kang Jae-won	COC Members: (Oman) Issa Abdullah Al-Jabri; (Lebanon) Ahmad Darwich; (Kuwait) Faisal Baqer; (India) Anandeshwar Panday; (Japan) Noboru Goto; (China) Qiao Cheng; (South Korea) Ms. Hong Jeong-ho
AHF Playing Rules and Referees Commission (PRC)	(United Arab Emirates) Saleh bin Ashour	PRC Members: (Kuwait) Khalaf Al-Enezi; (Syria) Zuhir Samha; (Jordan) Zain Al-Abedin Bani Hani; (China) Wu Ruiting; (Japan) Minoru Nakada; (Thailand) Chatchai Sangsukeelux
AHF Commission of Coaching and Methods (CCM)	(Jordan) Taiysir Mansi	CCM Members: (Iran) Alireza Habibi; (Syria) Amjad Karwani; (Bahrain) Nabeel Taha Al-Shehab; (Jordan) Taiysir Mansi; (Iraq) Dhafer Sahib Mohammed
AHF Medical Commission (MC)	(Japan) Katsuhiko Sakuma	MC Members: (Iran) Mohammad Saeid Rajaei; (Bahrain) Hussein Al-Haddad
AHF Promotion and Public Relations Commission (CPP)	(Saudi Arabia) Hassan bin Nasr Hilal	CPP Members: (Lebanon) Helmi Cheaib; (Bahrain) Husain Al-Asfoor; (Oman) Othman Al-Qasmi; (Yemen) Ameen Al-Muddaeai; TBA; (Qatar) Matar Al-Zarraa; (Iraq) Kareem Abdullah Al-Rammahi
AHF Marketing Commission (MKC)	(Qatar) Mohammad Jaber Al-Mulla	MKC Members: (Kazakhstan) Daulet Turlykhanov; (Lebanon) Tamim Sulaiman; (Iraq) Abed Naji Oudah; (Saudi Arabia) Nasser Saab Al-Shammari; (United Arab Emirates) Nasir Al-Hammadi; (Indonesia) Ms. Vivin Cahyani
AHF Under Development Countries Commission (UDC)	(Uzbekistan) Ismoiljon Matkhalikov	UDC Members: (Yemen) Hamza Saleh Hamza; (Palestine) Jamal Abuyousef; (Jordan) Ms. Nour Obeidat; (Nepal) Tej Bahadur Gurung; (Sri Lanka) Francis Gihan Dalpethado; (Uzbekistan) Ms. Mavjuda Matkhalikova; (North Korea) Kim Kwang-su
AHF Commission of Youth and School Handball (CYSH)	(Thailand) Sombat Kuruphan	CYSH Members: (Oman) Moosa Al-Bulushi; (Philippines) Ms. Joanna Franquelli; (Kuwait) Ms. Samha Salem Al-Ajmi; (Oman) Ms. Abeer Ali Al-Zadjali; (Indonesia) Mustafa Masyhur; (China) Ms. Yang Li
AHF Arbitration Commission (AC)	(Pakistan) Muhammad Amir Yousaf	AC Members: (Iran) Rouzbeh Ahmadi; (Jordan) Ahmad Rawashdeh; (Hong Kong) Ms. Elizabeth Ling Yang; (Kuwait) Fahad Al-Hajri; (Qatar) Khalfan Al-Mohannadi; (Chinese Taipei) Lin Chia-Ho
AHF Ethics Commission (EC)	(Iran) Ms. Mitra Noori	EC Members: (Jordan) Mahmoud Yaghi; (United Arab Emirates) Abdulsalam Al-Mehairbi; (Yemen) Halah Hassan Al-Hadi
AHF Women's Commission (WC)	NA	WC Members: (Kazakhstan) Mrs. Gulnara Turlykhanova; (Vietnam) Ms. Nguyễn Thị Như Quỳnh; (Kazakhstan) Ms. Valentina Degtyareva; (Kuwait) Ms. Mona Khalil Kamal; (Kuwait) Ms. Dalal Mohammad
AHF Beach Handball Working Group (BHWG)	NA	BHWG Members: (United Arab Emirates) Ismail Salem Mohammad; (United Arab Emirates) Fadhil Ahmed Baqer; (Pakistan) Muhammad Imran; (Jordan) Mutasem Ahmad Khatatbeh; (China) Ms. Long Peili; (Thailand) Ms. Sirintra Poburipanich

== Tournaments ==
=== AHF ===
- Asian Men's Handball Championship
- Asian Women's Handball Championship
- Asian Men's Junior Handball Championship
- Asian Women's Junior Handball Championship
- Asian Men's Youth Handball Championship
- Asian Women's Youth Handball Championship
- Asian Games
- Asian Youth Games
- Asian Men's U-17 Handball Championship
- Asian Women's U-17 Handball Championship

=== Club ===
- Asian Club League Handball Championship
- Asian Women's Club League Handball Championship

=== Beach ===
- Asian Beach Handball Championship
- Asian Youth Beach Handball Championship
- Asian Beach Games

=== Zones ===
West Asia

- West Asian Women's Handball Championship
- West Asian Games

South Asia

- South Asian Men's Handball Championship
- South Asian Women's Handball Championship
- South Asian Games

Southeast Asia

- Southeast Asian Games

East Asia

- East Asian Games

== Current champions ==
Category	Men's	Women's
Senior Handball Championship	Bahrain (2026) (1)	Japan (2024) (2)
Asian Games	Qatar (2022) (3)	Japan (2022) (1)
Junior Handball Championship	Japan (2024) (2)	Japan (2025) (1)
Asian Youth Games	Saudi Arabia (2025) (1*)	Iran (2025) (1*)
Youth Handball Championship	Japan (2024) (1)	China (2025) (1)
Beach Handball Championship	Oman (2025) (2)	Vietnam (2025) (3*)
Asian Beach Games	Qatar (2016) (3*)	Vietnam (2016) (1)
Youth Beach Handball Championship	Iran (2022) (1*)	Thailand (2022) (1*)
Club Handball Championship	(Saudi Arabia) Sharjah SC (2025) (1)	(Kazakhstan) Kaysar Club (2024) (3*)

(Titles) (*) Record titles

== Disputes ==
A dispute arises between the International Handball Federation (IHF) and the AHF following a controversial decision to replace referees of opening match of Asian Men's Handball Qualification Tournament for the 2008 Summer Olympics between Kuwait and South Korea played on 1 September 2007 in Toyota (Japan). AHF replaced experienced and IHF nominated German referees Lemme and Ulrich with Jordanian referees Al-Shoubaki and Hirzallah, neither of whom stood on the list of IHF-qualified referees having "IHF Status", meaning that they had not completed the Global Referees Training Programme (GRTP), a program established by the IHF for the development of IHF-level referees. The Jordanian referee pair completely destroyed the South Korean team with more than 20 wrong decisions only in first half of the match which favoured the Kuwaiti team. IHF COC Chairman Aleksandr Kozhukhov (Russia) who was appointed by IHF as supervisor for the event and member of AHF Technical Committee Khalaf Al-Enezi (Kuwait) intervened into the matter at half-time of the match and asked the referees to be fair but the South Korean team nevertheless could not get the result in their own favour losing the match by 28–20.

Later, on 17 December 2007, in an IHF Council meeting held in Paris (France), IHF decided not to approve the results of the event conduct by AHF and decided to replay both men's and women's events due to biased referee allegations. AHF objected against this decision and warned all the AHF member federations not to participate in the replay organised by IHF. Only South Korea and Japan participated in the IHF replay and South Korea won both men's and women's matches. On February 5, 2008, AHF imposed a fine of $1000 on both the Japan and South Korea and banned them from participating in any event organised by AHF until the fine is paid.

When the matter becomes that complicated, both AHF and IHF mutually decided to took the case to Court of Arbitration for Sport (CAS) for decision. The Kazakhstan Handball Federation and Kuwait Handball Association also want to become a party in the case but CAS refused their appeal. On 20 May 2008, after hearing all the parties, CAS decided to approve the result of IHF men's replay and also approved the AHF organised women's event results.

== Members ==
First level

- Bahrain
- China
- Iran
- Iraq
- Japan
- Kuwait
- Qatar
- Saudi Arabia
- South Korea
- United Arab Emirates
- Oman

Second level

- Chinese Taipei
- Jordan
- Kazakhstan
- Lebanon
- North Korea
- Syria
- Thailand

Third level

- Afghanistan
- Bangladesh
- Bhutan ✝
- Brunei
- Cambodia
- (Timor-Leste) East Timor
- Hong Kong, China
- India
- Indonesia
- Kyrgyzstan
- Laos ✝
- Macau China
- Malaysia
- Maldives
- Mongolia
- Nepal
- Pakistan
- Palestine
- Philippines
- Singapore
- Sri Lanka
- Tajikistan
- Turkmenistan
- Uzbekistan
- Vietnam
- Yemen
- ✝ non-active member

== Sponsors ==
- Al-Kass Sports Channel
- SK Group
- Molten Corporation
- Gerflor
