= Japan women's national youth handball team =

Japan

Information
- Association: Japan Handball Association
- Coach: Jang So-hee

Colours
1st	2nd

Results

IHF U-18 World Championship
- Appearances: 9 (First in 2006)
- Best result: 7th (2006)
- Last updated on Unknown.

The Japan women's youth national handball team is the national under-17 handball team of Japan. Controlled by the Japan Handball Association it represents the country in international matches.

== World Championship record ==
- 2006 – 7th place
- 2008 – 13th place
- 2010 – 15th place
- 2012 – 8th place
- 2014 – 14th place
- 2016 – 17th place
- 2018 – 14th place
- 2024 – 8th place
- 2026 – 9th place
