= Uzbekistan women's national youth handball team =

Uzbekistan

Information
- Association: Handball Federation of Uzbekistan
- Coach: Ulugbek Ikromov

Colours
1st	2nd

Results

IHF U-18 World Championship
- Appearances: 4 (First in 2014)
- Best result: 24th (2014, 2016, 2022)
- Last updated on Unknown.

The Uzbekistan women's youth national handball team is the national under-17 handball team of Uzbekistan. Controlled by the Handball Federation of Uzbekistan it represents the country in international matches.

== World Championship record ==
- 2014 – 24th place
- 2016 – 24th place
- 2022 – 24th place
- 2026 – 30th place
