= Kazakhstan women's national youth handball team =

Kazakhstan

Information
- Association: Kazakhstan Handball Federation
- Coach: Almaz Kozhamuratov

Colours
1st	2nd

Results

IHF U-18 World Championship
- Appearances: 8 (First in 2010)
- Best result: 16th (2010, 2012)
- Last updated on Unknown.

The Kazakhstan women's youth national handball team is the national under-17 handball team of Kazakhstan. Controlled by the Kazakhstan Handball Federation it represents the country in international matches.

== World Championship record ==
- 2010 – 16th place
- 2012 – 16th place
- 2014 – 21st place
- 2016 – 19th place
- 2018 – 24th place
- 2022 – 27th place
- 2024 – 27th place
- 2026 – 24th place
