= South Korea women's national youth handball team =

South Korea

Information
- Association: Korea Handball Federation
- Coach: Park Jung-jin

Colours
1st	2nd

Results

IHF U-18 World Championship
- Appearances: 10 (First in 2006)
- Best result: 1st (2022)
- Last updated on Unknown.

The South Korea women's youth national handball team is the national under-17 handball team of South Korea. Controlled by the Korea Handball Federation it represents the country in international matches.

== World Championship record ==
- 2006 – 2nd place
- 2008 – 6th place
- 2010 – 9th place
- 2012 – 9th place
- 2014 – 5th place
- 2016 – 3rd place
- 2018 – 3rd place
- 2022 – 1st place
- 2024 – 19th place
- 2026 – 14th place
