= China women's national youth handball team =

China

Information
- Association: Chinese Handball Association
- Coach: Shen Qiang

Colours
1st	2nd

Results

IHF U-18 World Championship
- Appearances: 5 (First in 2014)
- Best result: 7th (2026)
- Last updated on Unknown.

The China women's youth national handball team is the national under-17 handball team of China. Controlled by the Chinese Handball Association it represents the country in international matches.

== World Championship record ==
- 2012 – 22nd place
- 2014 – 20th place
- 2016 – 22nd place
- 2024 – 15th place
- 2026 – 7th place
