= Bangladesh women's national junior handball team =

Bangladeshi handball team

Bangladesh

Information
- Association: Bangladesh Handball Federation (BHF)
- Coach: Md Shamsul Islam Khan

Colours
1st	2nd

Results

IHF U-20 World Championship
- Appearances: None

Asian Women's Junior Handball Championship
- Appearances: 1 (First in 2000)
- Best result: Group stage (2000)
- Last updated on 29 November 2025.

The Bangladesh women's junior national handball team is the national under-19 handball team of Bangladesh. It is controlled by the Bangladesh Handball Federation (BHF) and is an affiliate of the International Handball Federation (IHF) as well as a member of the Asian Handball Federation (AHF). The team represents Bangladesh in international matches.

== Competitions history ==
=== IHF Women's U-20 World Championship ===
Champions Runners up Third place Fourth place

IHF Women's U20 Handball World Championship records
Hosts	Result	Position	GP	W	D	L	GF	GA
(Romania) 1977	Did not qualify							
(Socialist Federal Republic of Yugoslavia) 1979	Did not qualify							
(Canada) 1981	Did not qualify							
(France) 1983	Did not qualify							
(South Korea) 1985	Did not qualify							
(Denmark) 1987	Did not qualify							
(Nigeria) 1989	Did not qualify							
(France) 1991	Did not qualify							
(Bulgaria) 1993	Did not qualify							
(Brazil) 1995	Did not qualify							
(Ivory Coast) 1997	Did not qualify							
(China) 1999	Did not qualify							
(Hungary) 2001	Did not qualify							
(North Macedonia) 2003	Did not qualify							
(Czech Republic) 2005	Did not qualify							
(North Macedonia) 2008	Did not qualify							
(South Korea) 2010	Did not qualify							
(Czech Republic) 2012	Did not qualify							
(Croatia) 2014	Did not qualify							
(Russia) 2016	Did not qualify							
(Hungary) 2018	Did not qualify							
(Slovenia) 2022	Did not qualify							
(North Macedonia) 2024	Did not qualify							
Total	0/23	0 Titles	0	0	0	0	0	0

=== Asian Women's Junior Handball Championship ===
Champions Runners up Third place Fourth place

Asian Women's Junior Handball Championship records
Hosts	Result	Position	GP	W	D	L	GF	GA
(China) 1990	Did not participate							
(China) 1992	Did not participate							
(South Korea) 1995	Did not participate							
(China) 1996	Did not participate							
(Japan) 1998	Did not participate							
(Bangladesh) 2000	Group stage	6/7	2	0	0	2	22	73
(Jordan) 2002	Did not participate							
(Thailand) 2004	Did not participate							
(Kazakhstan) 2007	Did not participate							
(Thailand) 2009	Did not participate							
(Kazakhstan) 2011	Did not participate							
(Kazakhstan) 2013	Did not participate							
(Kazakhstan) 2015	Did not participate							
(Hong Kong) 2017	Did not participate							
(Lebanon) 2019	Did not participate							
(Kazakhstan) 2022	Did not participate							
(Hong Kong) 2023	Did not participate							
(Uzbekistan) 2025	Did not participate							
Total	1/18	0 Titles	2	0	0	2	22	73
