= 2022 Asian Women's Club League Handball Championship =

5th Asian Women's Club League Handball Championship 2022
Tournament details
- Host country: Kazakhstan
- Venue(s): 1 (in 1 host city)
- Dates: 1–9 October 2022
- Teams: 7 (from 1 confederation)

Final positions
- Champions: (South Korea) SK Sugar Gliders
- Runners-up: (Kazakhstan) HC Dostyk
- Third place: (Kazakhstan) Alatau Arulary HC
- Fourth place: (Uzbekistan) Uzbechka Club

Tournament statistics
- Matches played: 21

The 2022 Asian Women's Club League Handball Championship was the 5th edition of the Asian Women's Club League Handball Championship held from 1 to 9 October 2022 at Almaty, Kazakhstan under the aegis of Asian Handball Federation. It was fourth time in history that championship was organised in Kazakhstan by the Kazakhstan Handball Federation. SK Sugargliders won the tournament and qualified for the 2023 IHF Women's Super Globe.

== Participating clubs ==
Seven clubs from five countries participated in the championship.

| Country | Previous appearances |
|---|---|
| (Kazakhstan) Alatau Arulary HC | 0 (debut) |
| (Iran) Foolad Mobarakeh SSC | 0 (debut) |
| (South Korea) SK Sugar Gliders | 0 (debut) |
| (Uzbekistan) Uzbechka Club | 3 (2016, 2017, 2018) |
| (India) T-Sports Club | 1 (2018) |
| (Kuwait) Al-Qurain SC | 0 (debut) |
| (Kazakhstan) HC Dostyk | 4 (2016, 2017, **2018, 2019**) |

^{1} Bold indicates champion for that year.

== Results ==
All times are local (UTC+6).

| Pos | Team | Pld | W | D | L | GF | GA | GD | Pts |
|---|---|---|---|---|---|---|---|---|---|
| 1 | (South Korea) SK Sugar Gliders (H) | 6 | 6 | 0 | 0 | 233 | 133 | +100 | 12 |
| 2 | (Kazakhstan) HC Dostyk | 6 | 5 | 0 | 1 | 239 | 159 | +80 | 10 |
| 3 | (Kazakhstan) Alatau Arulary HC | 6 | 4 | 0 | 2 | 178 | 90 | +88 | 8 |
| 4 | (Kuwait) Al-Qurain SC | 6 | 3 | 0 | 3 | 205 | 181 | +24 | 6 |
| 5 | (Uzbekistan) Uzbechka Club | 6 | 2 | 0 | 4 | 185 | 187 | −2 | 4 |
| 6 | (Iran) Foolad Mobarakeh SSC | 6 | 1 | 0 | 5 | 101 | 163 | −62 | 2 |
| 7 | (India) T-Sports Club | 6 | 0 | 0 | 6 | 79 | 309 | −230 | 0 |

Source: AHF
(H) Hosts

== Awards ==
- Most Valuable Player (MVP): Veronika Khardina (HC Dostyk)
- Goalkeeper: Lee Min-ji (SK Sugargliders HC)
- Right Back: Yu So-jeong (SK Sugargliders HC)
- Centre Back: Yelena Berenda (HC Dostyk)
- Left Back: Natalya Ilina (Alatau Arulary HC)
- Right Wing: Maryam Yousefi (Foolad Mobarakeh SSC)
- Pivot: Aruzhan Khamitova (Alatau Arulary HC)
- Left Wing: Haniyeh Karimi (Foolad Mobarakeh SSC)
