= 2020 Asian Women's Club League Handball Championship =

5th Asian Women's Club League Handball Championship 2020
Tournament details
- Host country: Kazakhstan
- Venue(s): 1 (in 1 host city)
- Dates: 27 June – 4 July 2021
- Teams: 5 (from 1 confederation)

The 2020 Asian Women's Club League Handball Championship will be the 5th edition of the championship, which will be held from 27 June to 4 July 2021 at Almaty, Kazakhstan under the aegis of Asian Handball Federation (AHF). It will be the fourth time in history that the championship will be organised by Kazakhstan Handball Federation. It also acts as a qualification tournament for the 2021 IHF Women's Super Globe with 1 quota place.

The championship was previously scheduled to take place from 6 to 14 November 2020 and then from 3 to 11 March 2021, but was postponed both times due to COVID-19 pandemic.

== Participating clubs ==
Four clubs from three countries participated in the championship.

Club	Previous appearances
(Kazakhstan) Astana Club	1 (2018)
(Kazakhstan) Kaysar Club	3 (**2016**, 2018, **2019**)
(Uzbekistan) Uzbechka Club	3 (2016, 2017, 2018)
(Kuwait) Al-Qurain SC	0 (debut)
(India) T-Sports Club	1 (2018)

^{1} Bold indicates champion for that year.
