= Kazakhstan Handball Federation =

Governing body of handball in Kazakhstan

Kazakhstan Handball Federation KHF
- IOC nation: Kazakhstan (KAZ)
- Sport: Handball
- Other sports: Beach Handball

HISTORY
- Year of formation: 1957; 68 years ago

AFFILIATIONS
- International federation: International Handball Federation (IHF)
- IHF member since: 1992
- Continental association: Asian Handball Federation
- National Olympic Committee: National Olympic Committee of the Republic of Kazakhstan

GOVERNING BODY
- President: Gulnara Turlykhanova

HEADQUARTERS
- Address: 48A, Abaya Street, Almaty
- Country: Kazakhstan
- Secretary General: Shyngys Abynayev

The Kazakhstan Handball Federation (Kazakh: Қазақстандық гандбол федерациясы; KHF) is the administrative and controlling body for handball and beach handball in Republic of Kazakhstan. KHF is a member of the Asian Handball Federation (AHF) and member of the International Handball Federation (IHF) since 1992.

== National teams ==
- Kazakhstan men's national handball team
- Kazakhstan men's national junior handball team
- Kazakhstan women's national handball team

== Competitions hosted ==
- 2021 Asian Women's Youth Handball Championship
- ~~2020 Asian Women's Club League Handball Championship~~ (Note: Cancelled due to COVID-19 pandemic)
- ~~2020 Asian Men's Youth Handball Championship~~
- 2019 Asian Women's Club League Handball Championship
- 2018 Asian Women's Club League Handball Championship
- 2016 Asian Women's Club League Handball Championship
- 2015 Asian Women's Junior Handball Championship
- 2013 Asian Women's Junior Handball Championship
- 2011 Asian Women's Junior Handball Championship
- 2010 Asian Women's Handball Championship
- 2007 Asian Women's Junior Handball Championship
- 2002 Asian Women's Handball Championship
