= Choi Su-ji (handballer) =

South Korean handball player (born 1995)

Personal information
- Nationality: South Korean
- Born: 10 April 1995 (age 31)
- Height: 1.62 m (5 ft 4 in)

Sport
- Sport: Handball
- Position: Left wing
- Current club: SK Sugar Gliders
- Number: 6
National team
Years	Team	Apps
–	South Korea	18
Medal record
Asian Championship
Gold medal – first place	2018 Japan
Junior World Championship
Gold medal – first place	2014 Croatia
Asian Junior Championship
Gold medal – first place	2013 Kazakhstan
Asian Youth Championship
Gold medal – first place	2011 Japan

Choi Su-ji (Korean: 최수지; born 10 April 1995) is a South Korean handball player for SK Sugar Gliders and the South Korean national team.

== Career ==
Choi first garnered attention at the 2013 Asian Junior Handball Championship where she led South Korea to their 12th title. Next year Choi participated in the 2014 IHF Junior World Handball Championship where she helped her team to win gold by beating Russia 34–27 in the final match on 13 July 2014.

Choi was selected by Colorful Daegu with the first overall pick in the 2014 KHL draft. While playing in Colorful Daegu, Choi converted her position from center back to left wing and became a regular fixture in the Daegu lineup. After playing in Daegu for three years Choi moved to SK Sugar Gliders prior to the 2017 season. In 2017 She led Sugar Gliders to the Handball Korea League title for the first time in the club's history.

In December 2019 Choi was called up to the South Korean national team and competed in the 2019 World Handball Championship.
