= Handball Association of Thailand =

Administrative body for handball in Thailand

Handball Association of Thailand Thai: สมาคมกีฬาแฮนด์บอลแห่งประเทศไทย HAT
- IOC nation: Kingdom of Thailand (THA)
- Sport: Handball
- Other sports: Beach Handball
- Official website: www.handballthailand.com

HISTORY
- Year of formation: 1995; 30 years ago
- Former names: Amateur Handball Association of Thailand

AFFILIATIONS
- International federation: International Handball Federation (IHF)
- IHF member since: 1998
- Continental association: Asian Handball Federation
- National Olympic Committee: National Olympic Committee of Thailand

GOVERNING BODY
- President: Sombat Kuruphan

HEADQUARTERS
- Address: Nimibutr Stadium National Stadium, Gate 19 Rama 1 Street, Bangkok
- Country: Thailand
- Secretary General: Police Colonel Norasak Heimnithi

The Handball Association of Thailand (Thai: สมาคมกีฬาแฮนด์บอลแห่งประเทศไทย) (HAT) is the administrative and controlling body for handball and beach handball in Thailand. HAT is a member of the Asian Handball Federation (AHF) and member of the International Handball Federation (IHF) since 1998.

== National teams ==
- Thailand men's national handball team
- Thailand men's national junior handball team
- Thailand women's national handball team
- Thailand national beach handball team
- Thailand women's national beach handball team

== Competitions hosted ==
- 2020 Asian Youth Beach Handball Championship
- 2017 Asian Beach Handball Championship
- 2014 Asian Beach Games
- 2013 Asian Women's Youth Handball Championship
- 2016 Asian Youth Beach Handball Championship
- 2009 Asian Women's Junior Handball Championship
- 2008 Asian Women's Handball Championship
- 2006 Asian Men's Handball Championship
- 2005 Asian Women's Youth Handball Championship
- 2005 Asian Men's Youth Handball Championship
- 2004 Asian Women's Junior Handball Championship
- 2002 Asian Men's Junior Handball Championship
- 1998 Asian Games
