= 2019 Asian Women's Club League Handball Championship =

4th Asian Women's Club League Handball Championship 2019
Tournament details
- Host country: Kazakhstan
- Venue(s): 1 (in 1 host city)
- Dates: 16–22 June 2019
- Teams: 4 (from 1 confederation)

Final positions
- Champions: (Kazakhstan) Kaysar Club
- Runners-up: (North Korea) 4.25 Club
- Third place: (Kazakhstan) Almaty Club
- Fourth place: (Uzbekistan) AGMK Club

Tournament statistics
- Matches played: 12
- Goals scored: 734 (61.17 per match)

The 2019 Asian Women's Club League Handball Championship was the 4th edition of the Asian Women's Club League Handball Championship held from 16 to 22 June 2019 at Almaty, Kazakhstan under the aegis of Asian Handball Federation. It was third time in history that championship was organised in Kazakhstan by the Kazakhstan Handball Federation. It also acts as the qualification tournament for the 2019 IHF Women's Super Globe with one quota place.

== Participating clubs ==
Four clubs from three countries participated in the championship.

Country	Previous appearances
(North Korea) 4.25 Club	0 (debut)
(Uzbekistan) AGMK Club	1 (**2017**)
(Kazakhstan) Almaty Club	3 (2016, 2017, **2018**)
(Kazakhstan) Kaysar Club	2 (**2016**, 2018)

^{1} Bold indicates champion for that year.

== Results ==
All times are local (UTC+6).

Pos	Team	Pld	W	D	L	GF	GA	GD	Pts
1	(Kazakhstan) Kaysar Club	6	6	0	0	213	175	+38	**12**
2	(North Korea) 4.25 Club	6	4	0	2	200	157	+43	**8**
3	(Kazakhstan) Almaty Club (H)	6	2	0	4	168	158	+10	**4**
4	(Uzbekistan) AGMK Club	6	0	0	6	153	244	−91	**0**

Source: AHF
(H) Hosts

16 June 2019; 15:00	**AGMK Club (Uzbekistan)**	**28–44**	**(Kazakhstan) Kaysar Club**	Universal Sports Complex Dostyk, Almaty

16 June 2019; 17:00	**4.25 Club (North Korea)**	**26–19**	**(Kazakhstan) Almaty Club**	Universal Sports Complex Dostyk, Almaty

17 June 2019; 15:00	**4.25 Club (North Korea)**	**30–33**	**(Kazakhstan) Kaysar Club**	Universal Sports Complex Dostyk, Almaty

17 June 2019; 17:00	**AGMK Club (Uzbekistan)**	**22–35**	**(Kazakhstan) Almaty Club**	Universal Sports Complex Dostyk, Almaty

18 June 2019; 15:00	**AGMK Club (Uzbekistan)**	**27–49**	**(North Korea) 4.25 Club**	Universal Sports Complex Dostyk, Almaty

18 June 2019; 17:00	**Almaty Club (Kazakhstan)**	**26–27**	**(Kazakhstan) Kaysar Club**	Universal Sports Complex Dostyk, Almaty

20 June 2019; 15:00	**Kaysar Club (Kazakhstan)**	**43–33**	**(Uzbekistan) AGMK Club**	Universal Sports Complex Dostyk, Almaty

20 June 2019; 17:00	**Almaty Club (Kazakhstan)**	**20–32**	**(North Korea) 4.25 Club**	Universal Sports Complex Dostyk, Almaty

21 June 2019; 15:00	**Kaysar Club (Kazakhstan)**	**34–28**	**(North Korea) 4.25 Club**	Universal Sports Complex Dostyk, Almaty

21 June 2019; 17:00	**Almaty Club (Kazakhstan)**	**38–19**	**(Uzbekistan) AGMK Club**	Universal Sports Complex Dostyk, Almaty

22 June 2019; 13:00	**4.25 Club (North Korea)**	**35–24**	**(Uzbekistan) AGMK Club**	Universal Sports Complex Dostyk, Almaty

22 June 2019; 15:00	**Kaysar Club (Kazakhstan)**	**32–30**	**(Kazakhstan) Almaty Club**	Universal Sports Complex Dostyk, Almaty
