= Bangladesh Handball Federation =

Governing body of handball in Bangladesh

Bangladesh Handball Federation BHF
- IOC nation: People's Republic of Bangladesh (BAN)
- Sport: Handball
- Other sports: Beach Handball; Wheelchair Handball
- Official website: www.bdhandball.org

History
- Year of formation: 30 September 1983; 43 years ago

Affiliation
- International federation: International Handball Federation (IHF)
- IHF member since: 1986
- Continental association: Asian Handball Federation
- National Olympic Committee: Bangladesh Olympic Association
- Other affiliation(s): South Asian Handball Federation; Commonwealth Handball Association; National Sports Council

Governing body
- Patron: Lt. Col. M. A. Hamid
- President: Nurul Fazal Bulbul

Headquarters
- Address: Bangabandhu National Stadium, Dhaka
- Country: Bangladesh
- Secretary General: Assaduzzaman Kohinoor

The Bangladesh Handball Federation (BHF) (Bengali: বাংলাদেশ হ্যান্ডবল ফেডারেশন) is the governing body of handball and beach handball in the People's Republic of Bangladesh. Founded in 1983, BHF is affiliated to the International Handball Federation and Asian Handball Federation. BHF is also affiliated to the Bangladesh Olympic Association and South Asian Handball Federation. It is based in Dhaka.

== History ==
Handball game was launched in Bangladesh in 1982 under the leadership of the then vice-president of National Sports Control Board MA Hamid. The then assistant director of National Sports Council, Siddiqur Rahman Munshi, and the general secretary, Asaduzzaman Kohinoor, were the facilitators for the overall management.

Hamid, organized a founding congress of BHF on 30 September 1983 along with some of the most prominent sports organizer and benevolent. The meeting was held at the office of the then DCMLA Secretariat (Present Prime Minister's Office) and was chaired by the Chief of Naval Staff Rear Admiral Mahbub Ali Khan. Under the leadership of Rear Admiral Mahbub Ali Khan an ad-hock committee was formed with him as chief patron, Hamid as president, General Secretary Ali Akbar, Joint Secretary Asaduzzaman Kohinoor.

On 1 May 1984, BHF received formal recognition by the then National Sports Control Board. BHF being incorporated with Asian Handball Federation, by their affiliation in 1985. The International Handball Federation (IHF), also given the affiliation in 1986, Commonwealth Handball Association in 1990 and South Asian Handball Federation incorporated as an affiliate member in 1995.

== National teams ==
- Bangladesh men's national handball team
- Bangladesh men's national junior handball team
- Bangladesh men's national youth handball team
- Bangladesh women's national handball team
- Bangladesh women's national junior handball team
- Bangladesh women's national youth handball team

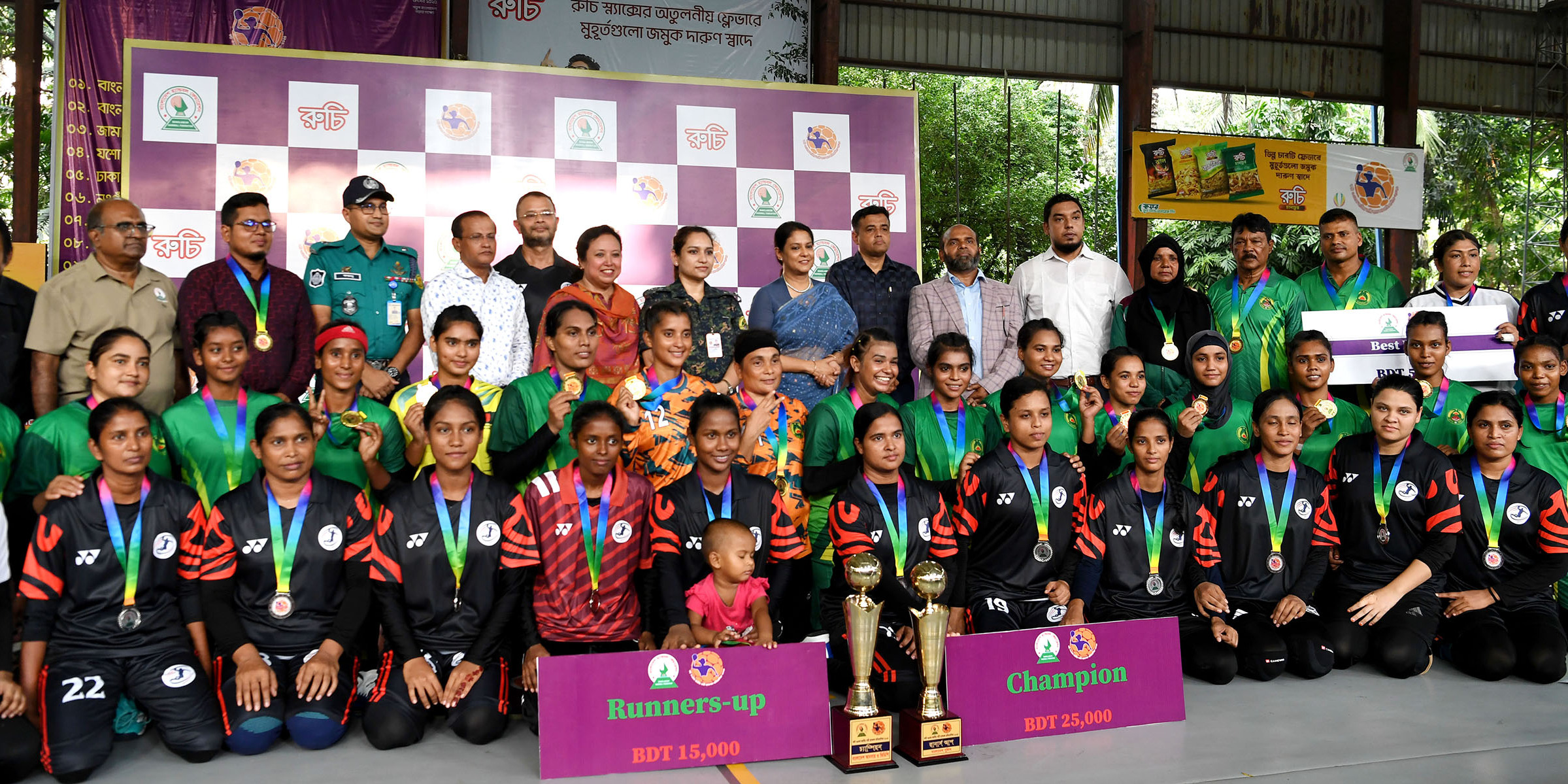
Syeda Rizwana Hasan, Advisor on Environment, Forests, Climate Change, and Water Resources, participated in a photo session with players of the 36th National Women's Handball Championship at the Shaheed (Captain) M. Mansur Ali National Handball Stadium on 25 August 2025.

== Competitions hosted ==
- 2000 Asian Women's Junior Handball Championship
- 2010 South Asian Games
