= 1998 Asian Women's Junior Handball Championship =

1998 handball championship in Asia

1998 Asian Junior Championship
Tournament details
- Host country: Japan
- Venue(s): 1 (in 1 host city)
- Dates: 31 August – 4 September 1998
- Teams: 5

Final positions
- Champions: South Korea (5th title)
- Runners-up: China
- Third place: Kazakhstan
- Fourth place: Japan

Tournament statistics
- Matches played: 10
- Goals scored: 463 (46.3 per match)
- Top scorer(s): (South Korea) Kim Hyang-ki (30)

The 1998 Asian Women's Junior Handball Championship (5th tournament) took place in Osaka from 31 August–4 September. It acts as the Asian qualifying tournament for the 1999 Women's Junior World Handball Championship.

== Results ==
Team	Pld	W	D	L	GF	GA	GD	Pts
South Korea	4	4	0	0	122	89	+33	8
China	4	3	0	1	92	86	+6	6
Kazakhstan	4	2	0	2	80	89	−9	4
Japan	4	1	0	3	89	92	−3	2
Chinese Taipei	4	0	0	4	80	107	−27	0

31 August 1998; 14:30	Japan	20–21	Kazakhstan	Maishima Arena, Osaka
31 August 1998; 14:30	six players 3	(8–12)	Kubassova, Sidorenko 6	Maishima Arena, Osaka
31 August 1998; 14:30	2× (yellow card) 2× (suspension)	Report	2× (yellow card) 3× (suspension)	Maishima Arena, Osaka

31 August 1998; 16:30	South Korea	25–19	China	Maishima Arena, Osaka
31 August 1998; 16:30	Kim H.K. 10	(12–7)	Li Y. 7	Maishima Arena, Osaka
31 August 1998; 16:30	3× (yellow card) 2× (suspension)	Report	2× (yellow card) 3× (suspension)	Maishima Arena, Osaka

1 September 1998; 14:30	South Korea	30–22	Chinese Taipei	Maishima Arena, Osaka
1 September 1998; 14:30	Myoung B.H. 5	(13–11)	Tu H.Y. 6	Maishima Arena, Osaka
1 September 1998; 14:30	2× (yellow card) 1× (suspension)	Report	1× (yellow card) 3× (suspension)	Maishima Arena, Osaka

1 September 1998; 16:30	China	22–15	Kazakhstan	Maishima Arena, Osaka
1 September 1998; 16:30	Li Y., Li Y.L. 6	(12–8)	Kubassova, Sidorenko 4	Maishima Arena, Osaka
1 September 1998; 16:30	3× (yellow card) 4× (suspension)	Report	2× (yellow card) 1× (suspension)	Maishima Arena, Osaka

2 September 1998; 14:30	Japan	19–20	China	Maishima Arena, Osaka
2 September 1998; 14:30	Sugaya 7	(8–9)	Li Y. 7	Maishima Arena, Osaka
2 September 1998; 14:30	4× (yellow card) 4× (suspension) 1× (red card)	Report	3× (yellow card) 2× (suspension) 1× (red card)	Maishima Arena, Osaka

2 September 1998; 16:30	Kazakhstan	24–16	Chinese Taipei	Maishima Arena, Osaka
2 September 1998; 16:30	Yegunova 6	(12–5)	Liang Y.P. 5	Maishima Arena, Osaka
2 September 1998; 16:30	1× (yellow card) 6× (suspension) 1× (red card)	Report	2× (yellow card) 5× (suspension)	Maishima Arena, Osaka

3 September 1998; 14:30	South Korea	31–20	Kazakhstan	Maishima Arena, Osaka
3 September 1998; 14:30	Lee H.Y. 9	(20–7)	Shapovalova 6	Maishima Arena, Osaka
3 September 1998; 14:30	2× (yellow card) 6× (suspension) 1× (red card)	Report	3× (suspension)	Maishima Arena, Osaka

3 September 1998; 16:30	Japan	22–15	Chinese Taipei	Maishima Arena, Osaka
3 September 1998; 16:30	Sugaya 6	(9–7)	Tu H.Y., Su C.L. 3	Maishima Arena, Osaka
3 September 1998; 16:30	3× (yellow card) 11× (suspension) 3× (red card)	Report	3× (yellow card) 6× (suspension) 1× (red card)	Maishima Arena, Osaka

4 September 1998; 14:30	China	31–27	Chinese Taipei	Maishima Arena, Osaka
4 September 1998; 14:30	Li Y.L. 8	(16–11)	Tsai P.L. 7	Maishima Arena, Osaka
4 September 1998; 14:30	2× (yellow card) 5× (suspension) 1× (red card)	Report	2× (yellow card) 6× (suspension) 1× (red card)	Maishima Arena, Osaka

4 September 1998; 16:30	South Korea	36–28	Japan	Maishima Arena, Osaka
4 September 1998; 16:30	Kim H.K. 13	(19–15)	Watanabe 8	Maishima Arena, Osaka
4 September 1998; 16:30	3× (yellow card) 6× (suspension) 1× (red card)	Report	3× (yellow card) 1× (suspension)	Maishima Arena, Osaka

== Final standing ==
Rank	Team
1st place, gold medalist(s)	South Korea
2nd place, silver medalist(s)	China
3rd place, bronze medalist(s)	Kazakhstan
4	Japan
5	Chinese Taipei

Team qualified for the 1999 Junior World Championship

== All-star team ==
- Kim Hyang-ki (KOR)
- Myoung Bok-hee (KOR)
- Li Yang (CHN)
- Li Yuling (CHN)
- Olessya Kubassova (KAZ)
- Yukari Asai (JPN)
- Liang Ya-ping (TPE)
