= 2022 Asian Women's Junior Handball Championship =

2022 handball championship in Asia

16th Asian Women's Junior Handball Championship 2022
Tournament details
- Host country: Kazakhstan
- Venue(s): 1 (in 1 host city)
- Dates: 7–14 March 2022
- Teams: 5 (from 1 confederation)

Final positions
- Champions: India (1st title)
- Runner-up: Iran
- Third place: Kazakhstan
- Fourth place: Uzbekistan

Tournament statistics
- Matches played: 10
- Goals scored: 552 (55.2 per match)

Awards
- Best player: (India) Bhawana Sharma

The 2022 Asian Women's Junior Handball Championship was 16th edition of the championship held from 7 to 14 March 2022 in Almaty, Kazakhstan under the aegis of Asian Handball Federation. It was the fifth time in history that the championship was organised by the Kazakhstan Handball Federation. It also acted as the qualification tournament for the 2022 Women's Junior World Handball Championship, with top tree teams from the championship directly qualifying for the event to be held in Slovenia.

Previously, the championship was supposed to be held in Uzbekistan, but in December 2021, AHF decided to move the event to Kazakhstan due to unavoidable circumstances. In January 2022, the championship was further postponed from the planned dates of February 13–20 due to the 2022 Kazakh unrest.

== Draw ==
The draw was held on 28 December 2021 in Almaty, Kazakhstan.

=== Seeding ===
Teams were seeded according to the AHF COC regulations and rankings of the previous edition of the championship. Teams who did not participated in the previous edition were in Pot 3.

Pot 1	Pot 2	Pot 3
Kazakhstan; ~~South Korea~~	Uzbekistan; India	Iran; Thailand

South Korea withdrew from the tournament after the draw.

== Results ==
All times are local (UTC+6).

Pos	Team	Pld	W	D	L	GF	GA	GD	Pts	Qualification
1st place, gold medalist(s)	India	4	3	0	1	139	112	+27	6 (Note: India 2 Pts, +3 GD; Iran 2 Pts, –1 GD; Kazakhstan 2 Pts, –2 GD)	2022 Junior World Championship
2nd place, silver medalist(s)	Iran	4	3	0	1	119	109	+10	6	2022 Junior World Championship
3rd place, bronze medalist(s)	Kazakhstan (H)	4	3	0	1	108	95	+13	6	2022 Junior World Championship
4	Uzbekistan	4	1	0	3	104	109	−5	2	
5	Thailand	4	0	0	4	82	127	−45	0	

Source: AHF
Rules for classification: 1) points; 2) head-to-head points; 3) head-to-head goal difference; 4) head-to-head number of goals scored; 5) goal difference.
(H) Hosts
Notes:

7 March 2022; 17:00	Thailand	20–28	Kazakhstan	Universal sports complex Dostyk, Almaty
7 March 2022; 17:00		(7–14)		Universal sports complex Dostyk, Almaty

8 March 2022; 15:00	India	32–31	Uzbekistan	Universal sports complex Dostyk, Almaty
8 March 2022; 15:00		(18–14)		Universal sports complex Dostyk, Almaty

8 March 2022; 17:00	Iran	24–30	Kazakhstan	Universal sports complex Dostyk, Almaty
8 March 2022; 17:00		(9–16)		Universal sports complex Dostyk, Almaty

10 March 2022; 15:00	India	37–42	Iran	Universal sports complex Dostyk, Almaty
10 March 2022; 15:00		(17–21)		Universal sports complex Dostyk, Almaty

10 March 2022; 17:00	Uzbekistan	30–23	Thailand	Universal sports complex Dostyk, Almaty
10 March 2022; 17:00		(14–11)		Universal sports complex Dostyk, Almaty

12 March 2022; 15:00	Thailand	21–28	Iran	Universal sports complex Dostyk, Almaty
12 March 2022; 15:00		(10–8)		Universal sports complex Dostyk, Almaty

12 March 2022; 17:00	India	29–21	Kazakhstan	Universal sports complex Dostyk, Almaty
12 March 2022; 17:00		(15–9)		Universal sports complex Dostyk, Almaty

13 March 2022; 15:00	Iran	25–21	Uzbekistan	Universal sports complex Dostyk, Almaty
13 March 2022; 15:00		(16–12)		Universal sports complex Dostyk, Almaty

14 March 2022; 15:00	Thailand	18–41	India	Universal sports complex Dostyk, Almaty
14 March 2022; 15:00		(9–20)		Universal sports complex Dostyk, Almaty

14 March 2022; 17:00	Kazakhstan	29–22	Uzbekistan	Universal sports complex Dostyk, Almaty
14 March 2022; 17:00		(16–9)		Universal sports complex Dostyk, Almaty

== All-Star Team ==
The all-star team was announced on 14 March 2022.

Position	Player
Goalkeeper	(India) Chetna Sharma
Centre back	(Hungary) Hedieh Veisi
Right back	(Japan) Bhawana Sharma
MVP	(India) Bhawana Sharma
