= 2017 Asian Women's Junior Handball Championship =

2017 handball championship in Asia

- Logo of 14th Asian Women's Junior Handball Championship

Tournament details
- Host country: Hong Kong
- Venue: 1 (in 1 host city)
- Dates: 15–23 July
- Teams: 7 (from 1 confederation)

Final positions
- Champions: South Korea (14th title)
- Runners-up: China
- Third place: Japan
- Fourth place: Kazakhstan

Tournament statistics
- Matches played: 21
- Goals scored: 1,162 (55.33 per match)

The 2017 Asian Women's Junior Handball Championship was the 14th edition of the championship organised by the Handball Association of Hong Kong China under the auspices of the Asian Handball Federation. It was held in Tsim Sha Tsui, Hong Kong from 15 to 23 July 2017. It was played in under-19 years category. It was the first time that Hong Kong staged the competition. It also acts as qualification tournament for the IHF Women's Junior World Handball Championship. Top three teams i.e. South Korea, China and Japan qualified for the 2018 Women's Junior World Handball Championship to be held in Hungary.

== Participating teams ==
1. Hong Kong (Host)
2. South Korea (Defending Champion)
3. Japan
4. Kazakhstan
5. China
6. Uzbekistan
7. India

== Round-robin ==
Team	Pld	W	D	L	GF	GA	GD	Pts
South Korea	6	5	1	0	230	117	+113	11
China	6	5	0	1	193	144	+49	10
Japan	6	4	1	1	197	99	+98	9
Kazakhstan	6	3	0	3	182	167	+15	6
Uzbekistan	6	2	0	4	150	200	−50	4
Hong Kong	6	1	0	5	83	197	−114	2
India	6	0	0	6	127	238	−111	0

== Match results ==
15 July 2017; 15:30	China	25–41	South Korea	Kowloon Park Sports Centre, Hong Kong
15 July 2017; 15:30		(10–21)		Kowloon Park Sports Centre, Hong Kong

15 July 2017; 17:00	Japan	32–19	Kazakhstan	Kowloon Park Sports Centre, Hong Kong
15 July 2017; 17:00		(17–9)		Kowloon Park Sports Centre, Hong Kong

15 July 2017; 18:30	Hong Kong	29–27	India	Kowloon Park Sports Centre, Hong Kong
15 July 2017; 18:30		(14–14)		Kowloon Park Sports Centre, Hong Kong

16 July 2017; 16:00	Uzbekistan	26–36	China	Kowloon Park Sports Centre, Hong Kong
16 July 2017; 16:00		(11–20)		Kowloon Park Sports Centre, Hong Kong

16 July 2017; 17:30	Kazakhstan	49–18	India	Kowloon Park Sports Centre, Hong Kong
16 July 2017; 17:30		(23–9)		Kowloon Park Sports Centre, Hong Kong

16 July 2017; 19:00	Hong Kong	8–35	South Korea	Kowloon Park Sports Centre, Hong Kong
16 July 2017; 19:00		(4–19)		Kowloon Park Sports Centre, Hong Kong

17 July 2017; 16:00	India	9–42	Japan	Kowloon Park Sports Centre, Hong Kong
17 July 2017; 16:00		(5–20)		Kowloon Park Sports Centre, Hong Kong

17 July 2017; 17:30	Uzbekistan	28–36	Kazakhstan	Kowloon Park Sports Centre, Hong Kong
17 July 2017; 17:30		(14–17)		Kowloon Park Sports Centre, Hong Kong

17 July 2017; 19:00	China	35–7	Hong Kong	Kowloon Park Sports Centre, Hong Kong
17 July 2017; 19:00		(21–6)		Kowloon Park Sports Centre, Hong Kong

19 July 2017; 16:00	China	26–24	Japan	Kowloon Park Sports Centre, Hong Kong
19 July 2017; 16:00		(12–12)		Kowloon Park Sports Centre, Hong Kong

19 July 2017; 17:30	Uzbekistan	23–37	South Korea	Kowloon Park Sports Centre, Hong Kong
19 July 2017; 17:30		(7–22)		Kowloon Park Sports Centre, Hong Kong

19 July 2017; 19:00	Kazakhstan	37–11	Hong Kong	Kowloon Park Sports Centre, Hong Kong
19 July 2017; 19:00		(17–8)		Kowloon Park Sports Centre, Hong Kong

20 July 2017; 16:00	India	28–29	Uzbekistan	Kowloon Park Sports Centre, Hong Kong
20 July 2017; 16:00		(15–16)		Kowloon Park Sports Centre, Hong Kong

20 July 2017; 17:30	South Korea	43–20	Kazakhstan	Kowloon Park Sports Centre, Hong Kong
20 July 2017; 17:30		(25–7)		Kowloon Park Sports Centre, Hong Kong

20 July 2017; 19:00	Japan	37–6	Hong Kong	Kowloon Park Sports Centre, Hong Kong
20 July 2017; 19:00		(20–4)		Kowloon Park Sports Centre, Hong Kong

22 July 2017; 16:00	Japan	41–18	Uzbekistan	Kowloon Park Sports Centre, Hong Kong
22 July 2017; 16:00		(21–9)		Kowloon Park Sports Centre, Hong Kong

22 July 2017; 17:30	South Korea	53–20	India	Kowloon Park Sports Centre, Hong Kong
22 July 2017; 17:30		(27–6)		Kowloon Park Sports Centre, Hong Kong

22 July 2017; 19:00	Kazakhstan	21–35	China	Kowloon Park Sports Centre, Hong Kong
22 July 2017; 19:00		(12–15)		Kowloon Park Sports Centre, Hong Kong

23 July 2017; 14:30	India	25–36	China	Kowloon Park Sports Centre, Hong Kong
23 July 2017; 14:30		(16–20)		Kowloon Park Sports Centre, Hong Kong

23 July 2017; 16:00	Hong Kong	22–26	Uzbekistan	Kowloon Park Sports Centre, Hong Kong
23 July 2017; 16:00		(11–10)		Kowloon Park Sports Centre, Hong Kong

23 July 2017; 17:30	South Korea	21–21	Japan	Kowloon Park Sports Centre, Hong Kong
23 July 2017; 17:30		(13–12)		Kowloon Park Sports Centre, Hong Kong

== Final standings ==
Rank	Team
1st place, gold medalist(s)	South Korea
2nd place, silver medalist(s)	China
3rd place, bronze medalist(s)	Japan
4	Kazakhstan
5	Uzbekistan
6	Hong Kong
7	India

Team qualified for the 2018 Women's Junior World Handball Championship
