= Asian Women's Club League Handball Championship =

AHF Asian Women's Club League Handball Championship
- Founded: 2016; 10 years ago
- Founder: Asian Handball Federation
- First season: 2016
- Countries: AHF members
- Most recent champion: (Kazakhstan) Kaysar Club (3rd title)
- Most titles: (Kazakhstan) Kaysar Club (3 titles)
- Website: asianhandball.org/awclhc/

The Asian Women's Club League Handball Championship, organized by the Asian Handball Federation, is the official competition for women's handball clubs of Asia crowning the Asian champions.

== Summary ==
Year	Host				
Year	Host	Winners	Runners-up	Third place	Fourth place
2016; Details	(Kazakhstan); Kyzylorda	(Kazakhstan); Kaysar Club	(Kazakhstan); Almaty Club	(Kazakhstan); Ile Club	(Uzbekistan); Uzbechka Club
2017; Details	(Uzbekistan); Tashkent	(Uzbekistan); AGMK Club	(Kazakhstan); Ile Club	(Kazakhstan); Almaty Club	(Iran); Larestan Club
2018; Details	(Kazakhstan); Almaty	(Kazakhstan); Almaty Club	(Kazakhstan); Kaysar Club	(Kazakhstan); Astana Club	(Uzbekistan); Uzbechka Club
2019; Details	(Kazakhstan); Almaty	(Kazakhstan); Kaysar Club	(North Korea); 4.25 Club	(Kazakhstan); Almaty Club	(Uzbekistan); AGMK Club
2022; Details	(Kazakhstan); Almaty	(South Korea); SK Sugar Gliders	(Kazakhstan); HC Dostyk	(Kazakhstan); Alatau Arulary HC	(Uzbekistan); Uzbechka Club
2023; Details	(Kazakhstan); Almaty	(South Korea); SK Sugar Gliders	(Kazakhstan); Kaysar Club	(India); T-Sports Club	(Uzbekistan); Uzbechka Club
2024; Details	(Kazakhstan); Almaty	(Kazakhstan); Kaysar Club	(Kazakhstan); HC Dostyk	(India); Golden Eagles Bharat	(Uzbekistan); Uzbechka Club

== Performances ==
=== By club ===
Rank	Club	Gold	Silver	Bronze	Total
1	(Kazakhstan) Kaysar Club	3	2	0	5
2	(South Korea) SK Sugar Gliders	2	0	0	2
3	(Kazakhstan) Almaty Club	1	1	2	4
4	(Uzbekistan) AGMK Club	1	0	0	1
5	(Kazakhstan) HC Dostyk	0	2	0	2
6	(Kazakhstan) Ile Club	0	1	1	2
7	(North Korea) 4.25 Club	0	1	0	1
8	(Kazakhstan) Alatau Arulary HC	0	0	1	1
8	(Kazakhstan) Astana Club	0	0	1	1
8	(India) Golden Eagles Bharat	0	0	1	1
8	(India) T-Sports Club	0	0	1	1
Totals (11 entries)		7	7	7	21

=== By nation ===
Rank	Nation	Gold	Silver	Bronze	Total
1	Kazakhstan	4	6	5	15
2	South Korea	2	0	0	2
3	Uzbekistan	1	0	0	1
4	North Korea	0	1	0	1
5	India	0	0	2	2
Totals (5 entries)		7	7	7	21
