= Chiang Mai Rajabhat University =

University in Thailand

Coordinates: 18°48′26″N 98°59′12″E

Chiang Mai Rajabhat University (CMRU; Thai: มหาวิทยาลัยราชภัฏเชียงใหม่) is a university in the north of Thailand under the Royal Thai Ministry of Education. The university was founded in 1924 as an agricultural teacher training college. In 1948, it became Chiang Mai Teachers College and offered majors in a variety of subjects. On 14 February 1982, the year of King Rama IX's sixtieth birthday, the king proclaimed Thailand's 36 teacher's colleges to be Rajabhat Institutes. They then began offering majors and degree programmes in non-teaching fields.

On 6 March 1985, the king granted the use of his royal crest as the Rajabhat Institute emblem. Rajabhat Institute Chiang Mai became Chiang Mai Rajabhat University in 2004.

Enrolment is about 30,000. There are five faculties, one graduate school, one international college and one autonomous institute, employing about 500 faculty members.

== Campus ==
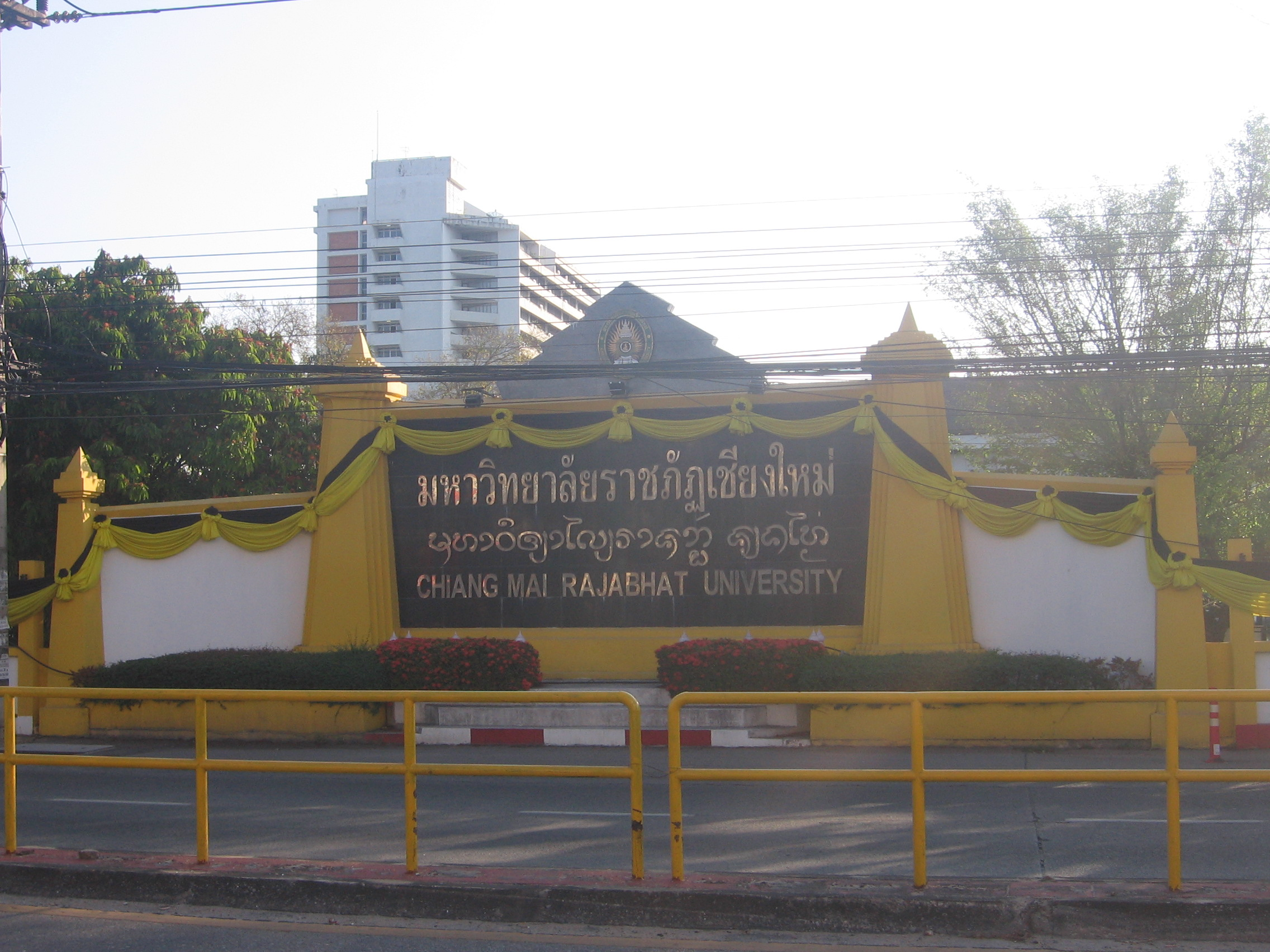
Chiang Mai Rajabhat University

There are four campuses:

- Wiang Bua Campus, is the main campus on Chang Phueak Road, in the center of Chiang Mai.
- Mae Sa Campus, the former campus of Faculty of Management Science, is in Mae Rim District, 10 kilometers from Chiang Mai.
- Mae Rim Campus (2,320 acres), campus of Faculty of Education and Faculty of Agricultural Technology, is in Mae Rim District, 27 kilometers from Chiang Mai.
- Mae Hong Son Campus, in Mae Hong Son, is the center for external services in education.

== Faculties ==
=== Faculty of Education ===
This faculty includes the Teaching Practicum Center, a Special Education Center and a Demonstration School for research and teaching. This faculty is moved from main campus to Mae Rim Campus since 2018.

=== Faculty of Humanities and Social Science ===
Chinese, Japanese, Korean, and Vietnamese language programs under the cooperation with international universities are offered, including student and teacher exchange programs.

=== Faculty of Science and Technology ===
The faculty trains graduates in sciences and applied sciences. The Science Center is a study center for local communities.

=== Faculty of Management Science ===
The Science faculty trains students in business management, economics, accounting, management science and public relations.

=== Faculty of Agricultural Technology ===
The faculty provides education in agriculture sciences.

== Graduate school ==
The graduate programs were established in 1995.

== International College ==
The CMRU International College is an academic institute that produces graduates in BA - Business English; BA - English; and BBA - International Business.

== Asian Institute for Community Economy and Technology ==
adiCET is a research and development institution for the well-being of the society by using green technologies. The institution offers MS and PhD degrees in community economy and technology development as well as a post-doctoral research program. The adiCET campus is on Chiang Mai Green City (CMGC). Chiang Mai Green City will be the first community in the world that uses only renewable energy and green technology while striving to be 100% sustainable.
