= Baluan Sholak Sports Palace =

Sport arena

- Балуан Шолақ атындағы спорт сарайы
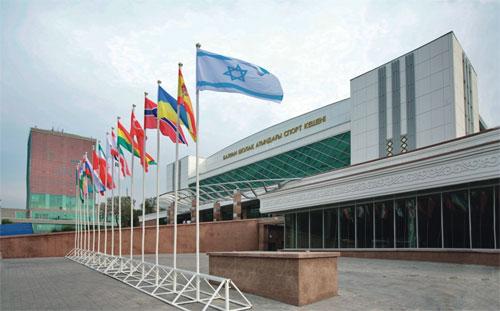
- Interactive map of Baluan Sholak Sports Palace
- Location: Almaty, Kazakhstan
- Capacity: 5,000

Construction
- Opened: 1967
- Renovated: 2009–2011

Tenants
- Aisulu Almaty; HC Almaty

The Baluan Sholak Sports Palace (Kazakh: Балуан Шолақ атындағы спорт сарайы, romanized: Baluan Şolaq atyndağy sport saraiy; Russian: Дворец спорта Балуана Шолака, romanized: Dvorets sporta Baluana Sholaka) or Bolyan Sholak Sports Palace is a Palace of Sports in Almaty, the former capital of Kazakhstan. It was built in 1967 and extensively renovated in 2009–2011. It is named after Baluan Sholak, a celebrated Kazakh composer, singer, poet, dombra player, dzhigit and wrestler.

It is the home arena for Aisulu Almaty, a women's ice hockey team based in Almaty, and HC Almaty, an ice hockey team playing in the Kazakhstan Hockey Championship.

== History ==
Built in 1967 by order of the State Committee for Physical Culture and Sports under the Council of Ministers of the Kazakh SSR. At the time of construction it had the main hall with 4 stands for 6 thousand seats, machine room for preparation of artificial ice, medical and methodological rooms. In the courtyard of the Palace of Sports international, all-Union and republican competitions in boxing, basketball and karate were held. Variety and ballet performances on ice, international exhibitions and national fairs were organized. The building has an extended first floor. On the main facade there is a loggia with solid stained glass window and a blind fence on the sides. In the middle section a long ramp is located in front of the entrance doors. The courtyard facade has large stained glass windows and a gate in the middle instead of the loggia. The first floors of the side facades are decided on a combination of blank wide smooth corner partitions and a frieze with solid stained glass. In the middle part between the doors are wide blank partitions with a low, polychrome two-colour relief of sports themes. On the main and courtyard facades the high blank wall has an arched gable and its surface is covered with large triangular prisms, which are symmetrically offset to each other and alternate in vertical rows. On the main facade on the upper left side of the shield is an applied flat-relief metal composition depicting runners with a torch; it is balanced by a parapet inscription of the full name of the structure on the right side of the entrance loggia. The upper part of the wall of the courtyard facade has a ribbon aperture. The upper stained glass windows of the side facades are covered with a four-row grid of flat rectangular plates placed obliquely. They are in pairs and are offset in relation to each other in adjacent rows. The western facade has a small loggia with a blank fence at the top. The team of architects: V. Katsev, I. Slonov, O. Naumova, V. Tolmachev and I. Tsitrin. On the eastern side of the building placed a sgraffito of graphic artist Yevgeny Sidorkin.

== Location ==
Situated in the central area of Almaty, close to the metro station Baikonur, the place adjoins the Central Stadium, Promenade Shopping Center, and Astana Hotel, and is accessible through Abai Avenue and Baitursynov Street. The Baluan Sholak Palace of Sport and Culture is a sports facility which accommodates up to 5,000 visitors.

== Renovation ==
The renovation was undertaken in preparation for the 2011 Asian Winter Games, for staging the hockey, short track and figure skating events. The closing ceremony of the Games was also held in the Palace. The number of seats was increased to 5000, and support facilities such as gyms, locker rooms and a press centre were added, as well as a medical and rehabilitation complex, commentator booths and electronic displays. The plan also included multi-storey parking for 850 cars.

== Events ==
Events held in the Palace of Culture and Sports have included:

- 15–16 May 2004 – 2004 Asian Judo Championships
- 1–7 July 2007 – 2007 Asian Women's Junior Handball Championship
- 19–25 December 2010 – 2010 Asian Women's Handball Championship
- 30 January – 6 February 2011 – 2011 Asian Winter Games ice hockey and closing ceremony
- 29 April – 1 May 2011 – semifinal and final of the 2010–11 UEFA Futsal Cup
- 14–20 September 2011 – 2011 Asian Women's Junior Handball Championship
- 14–15 January 2012 – 2012 World Judo Masters Championship
- 10–16 September 2012 – 2012 Asian Women's Cup Volleyball Championship
- 14–26 October 2013 – 2013 AIBA World Boxing Championships
- 28–29 September 2013 – Judo Grand Prix Almaty 2013
- 5–9 March 2014 – I Futsal Eremenko Cup final tournament
- 8–16 November 2014 – 2014 World Weightlifting Championships
- 8–14 November 2015 – 2015 Pacific-Asia Curling Championships
- 2–6 March 2016 – III Futsal Eremenko Cup final tournament
- 13–15 May 2016 – Judo Grand Prix Almaty 2016
- 5–7 February 2017 – Short track speed skating at the 2017 Winter Universiade
- 9–11 April 2021 – 2021 Asian Wrestling Olympic Qualification Tournament
- 13–18 April 2021 – 2021 Asian Wrestling Championships
- 19–22 December 2021 – 2021 Asian Karate Championships
- 25–30 December 2022 – World Rapid and Blitz Championships 2022
- 23 October 2024 – Thirty Seconds to Mars: Seasons Tour
- 4 July 2025 – Almaty Cadets Asian Cups 2025 judo tournament
- 19–30 September 2025 – World Cadet Chess Championship 2025

The building is also a venue for live concerts and entertainment.

== See also ==
- List of indoor arenas in Kazakhstan
