= 2002 Asian Women's Junior Handball Championship =

2002 handball championship in Asia

2002 Asian Junior Championship
Tournament details
- Host country: Jordan
- Venue(s): 1 (in 1 host city)
- Dates: 10–15 July 2002
- Teams: 5

Final positions
- Champions: South Korea (7th title)
- Runners-up: China
- Third place: Japan
- Fourth place: Chinese Taipei

Tournament statistics
- Matches played: 10
- Goals scored: 485 (48.5 per match)

The 2002 Asian Women's Junior Handball Championship (7th tournament) took place in Amman from 10 July–15 July. It acts as the Asian qualifying tournament for the 2003 Women's Junior World Handball Championship.

== Results ==
Team	Pld	W	D	L	GF	GA	GD	Pts
South Korea	4	4	0	0	123	78	+45	8
China	4	3	0	1	128	69	+59	6
Japan	4	1	1	2	108	85	+23	3
Chinese Taipei	4	1	1	2	85	91	−6	3
Jordan	4	0	0	4	41	162	−121	0

10 July 2002; 17:30	South Korea	28–23	Japan	King Hussain Sports Palace, Amman
10 July 2002; 17:30		(12–9)		King Hussain Sports Palace, Amman

10 July 2002; 19:30	Chinese Taipei	14–39	China	King Hussain Sports Palace, Amman
10 July 2002; 19:30		(5–18)		King Hussain Sports Palace, Amman

11 July 2002; 17:30	South Korea	22–20	China	King Hussain Sports Palace, Amman
11 July 2002; 17:30		(17–11)		King Hussain Sports Palace, Amman

11 July 2002; 19:30	Japan	45–10	Jordan	King Hussain Sports Palace, Amman
11 July 2002; 19:30		(23–7)		King Hussain Sports Palace, Amman

12 July 2002; 19:30	Chinese Taipei	37–7	Jordan	King Hussain Sports Palace, Amman
12 July 2002; 19:30		(16–4)		King Hussain Sports Palace, Amman

13 July 2002; 17:30	South Korea	30–19	Chinese Taipei	King Hussain Sports Palace, Amman
13 July 2002; 17:30		(16–6)		King Hussain Sports Palace, Amman

13 July 2002; 19:30	China	37–8	Jordan	King Hussain Sports Palace, Amman
13 July 2002; 19:30		(19–3)		King Hussain Sports Palace, Amman

14 July 2002; 19:30	Chinese Taipei	15–15	Japan	King Hussain Sports Palace, Amman
14 July 2002; 19:30		(7–8)		King Hussain Sports Palace, Amman

15 July 2002; 17:30	Japan	25–32	China	King Hussain Sports Palace, Amman
15 July 2002; 17:30		(8–18)		King Hussain Sports Palace, Amman

15 July 2002; 19:30	South Korea	43–16	Jordan	King Hussain Sports Palace, Amman
15 July 2002; 19:30		(22–6)		King Hussain Sports Palace, Amman

== Final standing ==
Rank	Team
1st place, gold medalist(s)	South Korea
2nd place, silver medalist(s)	China
3rd place, bronze medalist(s)	Japan
4	Chinese Taipei
5	Jordan

Team qualified for the 2003 Junior World Championship
