= 2015 Asian Women's Junior Handball Championship =

2015 handball championship in Asia

2015 Asian Women's Junior Championship
- Logo of 13th Asian Women's Junior Handball Championship

Tournament details
- Host country: Kazakhstan
- Venue: 1 (in 1 host city)
- Dates: 6–14 August 2015
- Teams: 6 (from 1 confederation)

Final positions
- Champions: South Korea (13th title)
- Runners-up: Japan
- Third place: Kazakhstan
- Fourth place: China

Tournament statistics
- Matches played: 15
- Goals scored: 916 (61.07 per match)

The 2015 Asian Women's Junior Handball Championship is the 13th edition of the Asian Women's Junior Handball Championship which took place from 6–14 August 2015 at Almaty, Kazakhstan. The tournament was held under the aegis of Asian Handball Federation. It also acts as the Asian qualifying tournament for the 2016 Women's Junior World Handball Championship.

== Participating teams ==
1. South Korea
2. Kazakhstan
3. China
4. Uzbekistan
5. Iran
6. Japan

== Results of Matches ==
=== Points table ===
Team	Pld	W	D	L	GF	GA	GD	Pts
South Korea	5	5	0	0	205	116	+89	10
Japan	5	4	0	1	167	121	+46	8
Kazakhstan	5	3	0	2	159	159	0	6
China	5	2	0	3	141	159	−18	4
Uzbekistan	5	1	0	4	125	191	−66	2
Iran	5	0	0	5	119	170	−51	0

=== Result of matches on 6th ===
6 August 2015	Iran	25-32	China	Almaty, Kazakhstan
6 August 2015		(8-12)		Almaty, Kazakhstan

6 August 2015	Kazakhstan	41-30	Uzbekistan	Almaty, Kazakhstan
6 August 2015		(18-12)		Almaty, Kazakhstan

=== Result of matches on 7th ===
7 August 2015	Japan	35-21	Iran	Almaty, Kazakhstan
7 August 2015		(15-12)		Almaty, Kazakhstan

7 August 2015	Uzbekistan	19-51	South Korea	Almaty, Kazakhstan
7 August 2015		(9-27)		Almaty, Kazakhstan

=== Result of matches on 8th ===
8 August 2015	Iran	25-26	Uzbekistan	Almaty, Kazakhstan
8 August 2015		(7-15)		Almaty, Kazakhstan

8 August 2015	Japan	33-25	China	Almaty, Kazakhstan
8 August 2015		(17-12)		Almaty, Kazakhstan

=== Result of matches on 10th ===
10 August 2015	Japan	31-26	Kazakhstan	Almaty, Kazakhstan
10 August 2015		(15-16)		Almaty, Kazakhstan

10 August 2015	China	21-41	South Korea	Almaty, Kazakhstan
10 August 2015		(6-22)		Almaty, Kazakhstan

11 August 2015	Kazakhstan	28-41	South Korea	Almaty, Kazakhstan
11 August 2015		(10-22)		Almaty, Kazakhstan

11 August 2015	Uzbekistan	31-35	China	Almaty, Kazakhstan
11 August 2015		(12-20)		Almaty, Kazakhstan

=== Result of matches on 13th ===
13 August 2015	Uzbekistan	19-39	Japan	Almaty, Kazakhstan
13 August 2015		(13-25)		Almaty, Kazakhstan

13 August 2015	China	28-29	Kazakhstan	Almaty, Kazakhstan
13 August 2015		(12-16)		Almaty, Kazakhstan

13 August 2015	South Korea	42-19	Iran	Almaty, Kazakhstan
13 August 2015		(22-6)		Almaty, Kazakhstan

14 August 2015	Kazakhstan	35-29	Iran	Almaty, Kazakhstan
14 August 2015		(15-11)		Almaty, Kazakhstan

14 August 2015	South Korea	30-29	Japan	Almaty, Kazakhstan
14 August 2015		(14-17)		Almaty, Kazakhstan

== Final standings ==
Rank	Team
1st place, gold medalist(s)	South Korea
2nd place, silver medalist(s)	Japan
3rd place, bronze medalist(s)	Kazakhstan
4	China
5	Uzbekistan
6	Iran

Team qualified for the 2016 Junior World Championship

== See also ==
- 2015 Asian Women's Youth Handball Championship
