= 2011 Asian Women's Junior Handball Championship =

2011 handball championship in Asia

2011 Asian Junior Championship
Tournament details
- Host country: Kazakhstan
- Venue(s): 1 (in 1 host city)
- Dates: 14–20 September 2011
- Teams: 8

Final positions
- Champions: South Korea (11th title)
- Runners-up: China
- Third place: Kazakhstan
- Fourth place: Japan

Tournament statistics
- Matches played: 18
- Goals scored: 1,050 (58.33 per match)

The 2011 Asian Women's Junior Handball Championship (11th tournament) took place in Almaty from September 14–20. It acts as the Asian qualifying tournament for the 2012 Women's Junior World Handball Championship.

== Draw ==
Group A	Group B
Japan; Kazakhstan; Chinese Taipei; Uzbekistan; Iran *	South Korea; China; Hong Kong; ~~Malaysia~~ *

* Malaysia withdrew, Following this Iran replaced Malaysia in Group B to balance the number of teams in each group.

== Preliminary round ==
=== Group A ===
Team	Pld	W	D	L	GF	GA	GD	Pts
Japan	3	3	0	0	113	71	+42	6
Kazakhstan	3	2	0	1	100	73	+27	4
Chinese Taipei	3	1	0	2	77	85	−8	2
Uzbekistan	3	0	0	3	78	139	−61	0

14 September 2011; 14:00	Japan	27–22	Chinese Taipei	Baluan Sholak Palace of Culture and Sports, Almaty
14 September 2011; 14:00		(11–10)		Baluan Sholak Palace of Culture and Sports, Almaty

14 September 2011; 18:00	Kazakhstan	43–28	Uzbekistan	Baluan Sholak Palace of Culture and Sports, Almaty
14 September 2011; 18:00		(18–12)		Baluan Sholak Palace of Culture and Sports, Almaty

15 September 2011; 14:00	Japan	56–20	Uzbekistan	Baluan Sholak Palace of Culture and Sports, Almaty
15 September 2011; 14:00		(31–11)		Baluan Sholak Palace of Culture and Sports, Almaty

15 September 2011; 18:00	Kazakhstan	28–25	Chinese Taipei	Baluan Sholak Palace of Culture and Sports, Almaty
15 September 2011; 18:00		(15–12)		Baluan Sholak Palace of Culture and Sports, Almaty

16 September 2011; 13:00	Chinese Taipei	40–30	Uzbekistan	Baluan Sholak Palace of Culture and Sports, Almaty
16 September 2011; 13:00		(21–11)		Baluan Sholak Palace of Culture and Sports, Almaty

16 September 2011; 18:00	Japan	30–29	Kazakhstan	Baluan Sholak Palace of Culture and Sports, Almaty
16 September 2011; 18:00		(16–15)		Baluan Sholak Palace of Culture and Sports, Almaty

=== Group B ===
Team	Pld	W	D	L	GF	GA	GD	Pts
South Korea	3	3	0	0	147	51	+96	6
China	3	2	0	1	80	69	+11	4
Iran	3	1	0	2	71	108	−37	2
Hong Kong	3	0	0	3	40	110	−70	0

14 September 2011; 16:00	South Korea	51–7	Hong Kong	Baluan Sholak Palace of Culture and Sports, Almaty
14 September 2011; 16:00		(27–4)		Baluan Sholak Palace of Culture and Sports, Almaty

14 September 2011; 20:00	China	29–19	Iran	Baluan Sholak Palace of Culture and Sports, Almaty
14 September 2011; 20:00		(14–10)		Baluan Sholak Palace of Culture and Sports, Almaty

15 September 2011; 16:00	South Korea	61–19	Iran	Baluan Sholak Palace of Culture and Sports, Almaty
15 September 2011; 16:00		(34–11)		Baluan Sholak Palace of Culture and Sports, Almaty

15 September 2011; 20:00	China	26–15	Hong Kong	Baluan Sholak Palace of Culture and Sports, Almaty
15 September 2011; 20:00		(13–7)		Baluan Sholak Palace of Culture and Sports, Almaty

16 September 2011; 15:00	South Korea	35–25	China	Baluan Sholak Palace of Culture and Sports, Almaty
16 September 2011; 15:00		(19–18)		Baluan Sholak Palace of Culture and Sports, Almaty

16 September 2011; 20:00	Hong Kong	18–33	Iran	Baluan Sholak Palace of Culture and Sports, Almaty
16 September 2011; 20:00		(10–17)		Baluan Sholak Palace of Culture and Sports, Almaty

== Placement 5th–8th ==
=== 7th/8th ===
18 September 2011; 14:00	Uzbekistan	28–26	Hong Kong	Baluan Sholak Palace of Culture and Sports, Almaty
18 September 2011; 14:00		(15–14)		Baluan Sholak Palace of Culture and Sports, Almaty

=== 5th/6th ===
18 September 2011; 16:00	Chinese Taipei	29–21	Iran	Baluan Sholak Palace of Culture and Sports, Almaty

== Final round ==
Semifinals
18 September – Almaty
Japan	19
China	27
18 September – Almaty
South Korea	44
Kazakhstan	33

Gold medal match
20 September – Almaty
China	15
South Korea	32
Bronze medal match
20 September – Almaty
Japan	31
Kazakhstan	39

=== Semifinals ===
18 September 2011; 18:00	Japan	19–27	China	Baluan Sholak Palace of Culture and Sports, Almaty
18 September 2011; 18:00		(9–13)		Baluan Sholak Palace of Culture and Sports, Almaty

18 September 2011; 20:00	South Korea	44–33	Kazakhstan	Baluan Sholak Palace of Culture and Sports, Almaty
18 September 2011; 20:00		(21–19)		Baluan Sholak Palace of Culture and Sports, Almaty

=== Bronze medal match ===
20 September 2011; 14:00	Japan	31–39	Kazakhstan	Baluan Sholak Palace of Culture and Sports, Almaty
20 September 2011; 14:00		(13–22)		Baluan Sholak Palace of Culture and Sports, Almaty

=== Gold medal match ===
20 September 2011; 16:30	China	15–32	South Korea	Baluan Sholak Palace of Culture and Sports, Almaty
20 September 2011; 16:30		(8–15)		Baluan Sholak Palace of Culture and Sports, Almaty

== Final standing ==
Rank	Team
1st place, gold medalist(s)	South Korea
2nd place, silver medalist(s)	China
3rd place, bronze medalist(s)	Kazakhstan
4	Japan
5	Chinese Taipei
6	Iran
7	Uzbekistan
8	Hong Kong

Team qualified for the 2012 Junior World Championship
