= 2004 Asian Women's Junior Handball Championship =

2004 handball championship in Asia

2004 Asian Junior Championship
Tournament details
- Host country: Thailand
- Venue: 1 (in 1 host city)
- Dates: 1–8 July 2004
- Teams: 6

Final positions
- Champions: South Korea (8th title)
- Runners-up: Japan
- Third place: China
- Fourth place: Chinese Taipei

Tournament statistics
- Matches played: 15
- Goals scored: 897 (59.8 per match)

The 2004 Asian Women's Junior Handball Championship (8th tournament) took place in Bangkok from 1 July–8 July. It acts as the Asian qualifying tournament for the 2005 Women's Junior World Handball Championship.

== Results ==
Team	Pld	W	D	L	GF	GA	GD	Pts
South Korea	5	5	0	0	192	118	+74	10
Japan	5	4	0	1	146	121	+25	8
China	5	3	0	2	159	133	+26	6
Chinese Taipei	5	2	0	3	163	153	+10	4
Thailand	5	1	0	4	99	194	−95	2
Kazakhstan	5	0	0	5	138	178	−40	0

1 July 2004; 15:30	Japan	34–9	Thailand	Bangkok
1 July 2004; 15:30		(20–5)		Bangkok

1 July 2004; 17:00	South Korea	34–29	Chinese Taipei	Bangkok
1 July 2004; 17:00		(18–10)		Bangkok

2 July 2004; 15:00	China	35–23	Kazakhstan	Bangkok
2 July 2004; 15:00		(16–10)		Bangkok

2 July 2004; 16:30	Thailand	16–51	South Korea	Bangkok
2 July 2004; 16:30		(10–24)		Bangkok

3 July 2004; 15:00	Japan	28–26	Kazakhstan	Bangkok
3 July 2004; 15:00		(15–12)		Bangkok

3 July 2004; 16:30	Chinese Taipei	23–35	China	Bangkok
3 July 2004; 16:30		(10–16)		Bangkok

5 July 2004; 14:00	Chinese Taipei	38–22	Thailand	Bangkok
5 July 2004; 14:00		(18–12)		Bangkok

5 July 2004; 15:30	Japan	31–25	China	Bangkok
5 July 2004; 15:30		(12–15)		Bangkok

5 July 2004; 17:00	South Korea	45–28	Kazakhstan	Bangkok
5 July 2004; 17:00		(22–12)		Bangkok

6 July 2004; 14:00	Kazakhstan	32–40	Chinese Taipei	Bangkok
6 July 2004; 14:00		(17–23)		Bangkok

6 July 2004; 15:30	China	42–22	Thailand	Bangkok
6 July 2004; 15:30		(15–10)		Bangkok

6 July 2004; 17:00	Japan	18–32	South Korea	Bangkok
6 July 2004; 17:00		(6–14)		Bangkok

7 July 2004; 14:00	Japan	35–29	Chinese Taipei	Bangkok
7 July 2004; 14:00		(18–17)		Bangkok

7 July 2004; 15:30	Thailand	30–29	Kazakhstan	Bangkok
7 July 2004; 15:30		(14–18)		Bangkok

7 July 2004; 17:00	South Korea	30–27	China	Bangkok
7 July 2004; 17:00		(15–13)		Bangkok

== Final standing ==
Rank	Team
1st place, gold medalist(s)	South Korea
2nd place, silver medalist(s)	Japan
3rd place, bronze medalist(s)	China
4	Chinese Taipei
5	Thailand
6	Kazakhstan

Team qualified for the 2005 Junior World Championship
