= 2009 Asian Women's Junior Handball Championship =

2009 handball championship in Asia

2009 Asian Junior Championship

Tournament details
- Host country: Thailand
- Venue(s): 1 (in 1 host city)
- Dates: 13–18 August 2009
- Teams: 5

Final positions
- Champions: South Korea (10th title)
- Runners-up: Japan
- Third place: China
- Fourth place: Thailand

Tournament statistics
- Matches played: 10
- Goals scored: 583 (58.3 per match)

The 2009 Asian Women's Junior Handball Championship (10th tournament) took place in Bangkok from 13 August–18 August. It acts as the Asian qualifying tournament for the 2010 Women's Junior World Handball Championship.

== Results ==
Team	Pld	W	D	L	GF	GA	GD	Pts
South Korea	4	4	0	0	144	110	+34	8
Japan	4	3	0	1	154	95	+59	6
China	4	2	0	2	125	108	+17	4
Thailand	4	1	0	3	95	132	−37	2
Hong Kong	4	0	0	4	65	138	−73	0

13 August 2009; 17:00	Thailand	28–19	Hong Kong	Bangkok
13 August 2009; 17:00		(12–10)		Bangkok

13 August 2009; 18:30	South Korea	41–25	China	Bangkok
13 August 2009; 18:30		(18–13)		Bangkok

14 August 2009; 17:00	Japan	41–20	Thailand	Bangkok
14 August 2009; 17:00		(20–9)		Bangkok

14 August 2009; 18:30	China	35–12	Hong Kong	Bangkok
14 August 2009; 18:30		(18–4)		Bangkok

15 August 2009; 18:30	South Korea	33–31	Japan	Bangkok
15 August 2009; 18:30		(13–19)		Bangkok

16 August 2009; 17:00	China	33–17	Thailand	Bangkok
16 August 2009; 17:00		(15–11)		Bangkok

16 August 2009; 18:30	South Korea	31–24	Hong Kong	Bangkok
16 August 2009; 18:30		(13–8)		Bangkok

17 August 2009; 15:00	Japan	44–10	Hong Kong	Bangkok
17 August 2009; 15:00		(22–4)		Bangkok

18 August 2009; 17:00	South Korea	39–30	Thailand	Bangkok
18 August 2009; 17:00		(19–13)		Bangkok

18 August 2009; 18:30	Japan	38–32	China	Bangkok
18 August 2009; 18:30		(20–18)		Bangkok

== Final standing ==
Rank	Team
1st place, gold medalist(s)	South Korea
2nd place, silver medalist(s)	Japan
3rd place, bronze medalist(s)	China
4	Thailand
5	Hong Kong

Team qualified for the 2010 Junior World Championship
