= Thailand women's national handball team =

Thailand

Information
- Association: Handball Association of Thailand
- Coach: (Thailand) SANIT IAMPHUCHUAI
- Assistant coach: (Thailand) Khajorn Treesopanakorn (Thailand) Krissnat Chalermpong (Thailand) Bubpha Srikate
- Captain: Natthawan Khropbuaban

Colours
1st	2nd

Results

World Championship
- Appearances: 1 (First in 2009)
- Best result: 21st (2009)

Asian Championship
- Appearances: 3 (First in 2008)
- Best result: 4th (2008)
- Last updated on Unknown.

The Thailand women's national handball team is the national handball team of Thailand and takes part in international team handball competitions.

The team has participated in a single World Championship. They played in the 2009 World Women's Handball Championship in China, finishing 21st of 24.

Their best position at the Asian Championship is a 4th place at the 2008 Asian Women's Handball Championship. At the 2010 Asian Women's Handball Championship they finished in 7th place.

== Results ==
=== World Championship ===
- 2009 – 21st place

=== Asian Games ===
- 1998 – 6th place
- 2006 – 7th place
- 2010 – 7th place
- 2014 – 7th place
- 2018 – 4th place
- 2022 – 8th place

=== Asian Championship ===
- 2008 – 4th place
- 2010 – 7th place
- 2022 – 7th place
- 2026 – Qualified

=== SEA Games ===
- 2007 – 1st place
- 2021 – 2nd place
- 2025 – 2nd place

== Current squad ==
Squad for the 2025 SEA Games (33rd SEA Games).
Head coach: (Thailand) SANIT IAMPHUCHUAI
Assistant coaches: (Thailand) KHAJORN TREESOPANAKORN, (Thailand) KRISSANAT CHALERMPONG, (Thailand) BUPPHA SRIKET

No.	Pos.	Name	Date of birth (age)	Height	App.	Goals	Club
1	GK	Tanaphorn Jantawong	19 June 2006 (age 20)	1.63 m			(Thailand) THAILAND NATIONNAL SPORT UNIVERSITY
4	RW	Sasikorn Phanthonglo	11 December 2006 (age 19)	1.57 m			(Thailand) Kasetsart University
5	CB	Natthawan Khropbuaban	22 June 1999 (age 27)	1.70 m			(Thailand) Kasetsart University
7	LB	Nattawan Polphon	6 August 2007 (age 19)	1.68 m			(Thailand) Nonthaburi
9	GK	Paradee Namthong	14 August 2007 (age 19)	1.72 m			(Thailand)
12	GK	Thanawadee Buaban	12 February 2005 (age 21)	1.67 m			(Thailand) Chiang Mai Rajabhat University
14		Supanya Saohong	2 September 2006 (age 20)	1.66 m			(Thailand) THAILAND NATIONNAL SPORT UNIVERSITY
15	CB	Siraprapa Pakkavesa	18 February 2000 (age 26)	1.58 m			(Thailand) Nonthaburi
16	LW	Thamonwan Thongthirat	26 July 2004 (age 22)	1.61 m			(Thailand) Chiang Mai Rajabhat University
18		Wisitsiri Mokkharak	6 June 2005 (age 21)	1.62 m			(Thailand)
19	RB	Kittima Kongkul	10 February 2006 (age 20)	1.75 m			(Thailand)
20	P	Preechaya Junmanee	26 January 1999 (age 27)	1.73 m			(Thailand) Bangkok
22	RB	Wantanee Wichaisang	7 November 2000 (age 26)	1.67 m			(Thailand) Nonthaburi
24	LW	Natthida Rattanapirom	6 April 2004 (age 22)	1.66 m			(Thailand) Kasetsart University
27	RW	Pimpatcha Seethong	29 July 2006 (age 20)	1.64 m			(Thailand) Chiang Mai Rajabhat University
28	LB	Rotsukhon Bunrueang	28 March 2005 (age 21)	1.66 m			(Thailand) Chiang Mai Rajabhat University
69	P	Krittiya Khamwongsa	2 January 2005 (age 21)	1.63 m			(Thailand) Chiang Mai Rajabhat University
71		Yupadee Sainoiyao	25 June 2003 (age 23)	1.57 m			(Thailand) THAILAND NATIONNAL SPORT UNIVERSITY

== Previous squads ==
=== 2022 Asian Games ===
Squad for the 2022 Asian Games.
Head coach: (Thailand) Khajorn Treesopanakorn
Assistant coaches: (Thailand) Komol Rattanadee, (Thailand) Krissanat Chalermpong, (Thailand) Buppha Sriket

No.	Pos.	Name	Date of birth (age)	Height	App.	Goals	Club
3	LB	Patcharamai Laophila	8 September 2005 (aged 18)	1.62 m	3	0	(Thailand) Srisaket
5	CB	Natthawan Khropbuaban	22 June 1999 (aged 24)	1.70 m	11	24	(Thailand) Chaiyaphum
6	LW	Natthida Rattanapirom	6 April 2004 (aged 19)	1.66 m	3	0	(Thailand) Kasetsart University
7	LB	Jirarat Maiman	1 July 1999 (aged 24)	1.66 m	7	11	(Thailand) Kasetsart University
8	RW	Sakonsupa Kahan	23 February 2006 (aged 17)	1.70 m	3	0	(Thailand) Khonkaen
11	LB	Rotsukhon Bunrueang	28 March 2005 (aged 18)	1.68 m	3	0	(Thailand) Chiang Mai Rajabhat University
12	GK	Thanawadee Buaban	12 February 2005 (aged 18)	1.68 m	3	0	(Thailand) Chiang Mai Rajabhat University
18	RW	Pornsawan Klangsuwan	11 October 2000 (aged 22)	1.72 m	3	2	(Thailand) -
20	P	Preechaya Junmanee	26 January 1999 (aged 24)	1.72 m	13	39	(Thailand) Bangkok
22	RB	Wantanee Wichaisang	7 November 2000 (aged 22)	1.67 m	13	101	(Thailand) Nonthaburi
24	GK	Waruephat Supakorn	22 July 2002 (aged 21)	1.72 m	3	0	(Thailand) Nonthaburi
27	RW	Pimpatcha Seethong	29 July 2006 (aged 17)	1.63 m	3	0	(Thailand) Nonthaburi
33	LW	Sainam Champathong	14 September 2003 (aged 20)	1.63 m	3	3	(Thailand) Srisaket
35	RB	Wanna Butchan	26 February 2003 (aged 20)	1.76 m	3	0	(Thailand) Srisaket
88	LW	Petcharat Kraiwisettham	28 June 2005 (aged 18)	1.61 m	3	2	(Thailand) Srisaket
