= 2013 Asian Women's Junior Handball Championship =

2013 handball championship in Asia

2013 Asian Junior Championship
Tournament details
- Host country: Kazakhstan
- Venue(s): 1 (in 1 host city)
- Dates: 23–29 June 2013
- Teams: 5

Final positions
- Champions: South Korea (12th title)
- Runners-up: Japan
- Third place: China
- Fourth place: Kazakhstan

Tournament statistics
- Matches played: 10
- Goals scored: 572 (57.2 per match)

The 2013 Asian Women's Junior Handball Championship (12th tournament) took place in Almaty from June 23–29. It acts as the Asian qualifying tournament for the 2014 Women's Junior World Handball Championship.

== Results ==
| Team | Pld | W | D | L | GF | GA | GD | Pts |
|---|---|---|---|---|---|---|---|---|
| South Korea | 4 | 4 | 0 | 0 | 143 | 75 | +68 | 8 |
| Japan | 4 | 3 | 0 | 1 | 153 | 99 | +54 | 6 |
| China | 4 | 2 | 0 | 2 | 109 | 108 | +1 | 4 |
| Kazakhstan | 4 | 1 | 0 | 3 | 99 | 113 | −14 | 2 |
| Uzbekistan | 4 | 0 | 0 | 4 | 68 | 177 | −109 | 0 |

| 23 June 2013; 15:00 | Japan | 18–27 | South Korea | Baluan Sholak Palace of Culture and Sports, Almaty |
| 23 June 2013; 15:00 | | (11–13) | | Baluan Sholak Palace of Culture and Sports, Almaty |

| 23 June 2013; 18:00 | Kazakhstan | 33–22 | Uzbekistan | Baluan Sholak Palace of Culture and Sports, Almaty |
| 23 June 2013; 18:00 | | (17–8) | | Baluan Sholak Palace of Culture and Sports, Almaty |

| 24 June 2013; 16:30 | South Korea | 48–14 | Uzbekistan | Baluan Sholak Palace of Culture and Sports, Almaty |
| 24 June 2013; 16:30 | | (24–4) | | Baluan Sholak Palace of Culture and Sports, Almaty |

| 24 June 2013; 18:30 | Japan | 35–24 | China | Baluan Sholak Palace of Culture and Sports, Almaty |
| 24 June 2013; 18:30 | | (13–12) | | Baluan Sholak Palace of Culture and Sports, Almaty |

| 26 June 2013; 16:30 | Uzbekistan | 14–60 | Japan | Baluan Sholak Palace of Culture and Sports, Almaty |
| 26 June 2013; 16:30 | | (5–30) | | Baluan Sholak Palace of Culture and Sports, Almaty |

| 26 June 2013; 18:30 | China | 20–18 | Kazakhstan | Baluan Sholak Palace of Culture and Sports, Almaty |
| 26 June 2013; 18:30 | | (8–11) | | Baluan Sholak Palace of Culture and Sports, Almaty |

| 27 June 2013; 16:30 | China | 37–18 | Uzbekistan | Baluan Sholak Palace of Culture and Sports, Almaty |
| 27 June 2013; 16:30 | | (17–7) | | Baluan Sholak Palace of Culture and Sports, Almaty |

| 27 June 2013; 18:30 | Kazakhstan | 15–31 | South Korea | Baluan Sholak Palace of Culture and Sports, Almaty |
| 27 June 2013; 18:30 | | (4–16) | | Baluan Sholak Palace of Culture and Sports, Almaty |

| 29 June 2013; 16:30 | South Korea | 37–28 | China | Baluan Sholak Palace of Culture and Sports, Almaty |
| 29 June 2013; 16:30 | | (19–15) | | Baluan Sholak Palace of Culture and Sports, Almaty |

| 29 June 2013; 18:30 | Kazakhstan | 34–40 | Japan | Baluan Sholak Palace of Culture and Sports, Almaty |
| 29 June 2013; 18:30 | | (15–21) | | Baluan Sholak Palace of Culture and Sports, Almaty |

== Final standing ==
| Rank | Team |
|---|---|
| 1st place, gold medalist(s) | South Korea |
| 2nd place, silver medalist(s) | Japan |
| 3rd place, bronze medalist(s) | China |
| 4 | Kazakhstan |
| 5 | Uzbekistan |

| Team qualified for the 2014 Junior World Championship |
