= 2007 Asian Women's Junior Handball Championship =

2007 handball championship in Asia

2007 Asian Junior Championship
Tournament details
- Host country: Kazakhstan
- Venue(s): 1 (in 1 host city)
- Dates: 1–7 July 2007
- Teams: 7

Final positions
- Champions: South Korea (9th title)
- Runners-up: Kazakhstan
- Third place: Chinese Taipei
- Fourth place: Japan

Tournament statistics
- Matches played: 14
- Goals scored: 777 (55.5 per match)

The 2007 Asian Women's Junior Handball Championship (9th tournament) took place in Almaty from 1 July–7 July. It acts as the Asian qualifying tournament for the 2008 Women's Junior World Handball Championship.

== Draw ==
Group A	Group B
South Korea; China; Chinese Taipei; Iran	Japan; Kazakhstan; Qatar

== Preliminary round ==
=== Group A ===
Team	Pld	W	D	L	GF	GA	GD	Pts
South Korea	3	3	0	0	130	70	+60	6
Chinese Taipei	3	1	1	1	90	89	+1	3
China	3	1	1	1	87	94	−7	3
Iran	3	0	0	3	66	120	−54	0

1 July 2007; 17:00	China	32–27	Iran	Baluan Sholak Palace of Culture and Sports, Almaty

1 July 2007; 18:30	South Korea	42–23	Chinese Taipei	Baluan Sholak Palace of Culture and Sports, Almaty

2 July 2007; 15:30	South Korea	46–17	Iran	Baluan Sholak Palace of Culture and Sports, Almaty

2 July 2007; 17:00	China	25–25	Chinese Taipei	Baluan Sholak Palace of Culture and Sports, Almaty
2 July 2007; 17:00		(13–12)		Baluan Sholak Palace of Culture and Sports, Almaty

3 July 2007; 15:30	South Korea	42–30	China	Baluan Sholak Palace of Culture and Sports, Almaty
3 July 2007; 15:30		(20–13)		Baluan Sholak Palace of Culture and Sports, Almaty

3 July 2007; 17:00	Chinese Taipei	42–22	Iran	Baluan Sholak Palace of Culture and Sports, Almaty
3 July 2007; 17:00		(19–10)		Baluan Sholak Palace of Culture and Sports, Almaty

=== Group B ===
Team	Pld	W	D	L	GF	GA	GD	Pts
Kazakhstan	2	2	0	0	68	30	+38	4
Japan	2	1	0	1	58	35	+23	2
Qatar	2	0	0	2	18	79	−61	0

1 July 2007; 15:30	Qatar	10–41	Kazakhstan	Baluan Sholak Palace of Culture and Sports, Almaty
1 July 2007; 15:30		(4–18)		Baluan Sholak Palace of Culture and Sports, Almaty

2 July 2007; 18:30	Japan	38–8	Qatar	Baluan Sholak Palace of Culture and Sports, Almaty
2 July 2007; 18:30		(21–3)		Baluan Sholak Palace of Culture and Sports, Almaty

3 July 2007; 18:30	Japan	20–27	Kazakhstan	Baluan Sholak Palace of Culture and Sports, Almaty
3 July 2007; 18:30		(11–15)		Baluan Sholak Palace of Culture and Sports, Almaty

== Placement 5th/6th ==
6 July 2007; 16:30	China	10–0	Qatar	Baluan Sholak Palace of Culture and Sports, Almaty
6 July 2007; 16:30		(Walkover)		Baluan Sholak Palace of Culture and Sports, Almaty

== Final round ==
Semifinals
5 July – Almaty
South Korea	33
Japan	27
5 July – Almaty
Kazakhstan	31
Chinese Taipei	25

Gold medal match
7 July – Almaty
South Korea	40
Kazakhstan	27
Bronze medal match
7 July – Almaty
Japan	33
Chinese Taipei	34

=== Semifinals ===
5 July 2007; 16:30	South Korea	33–27	Japan	Baluan Sholak Palace of Culture and Sports, Almaty
5 July 2007; 16:30		(18–11)		Baluan Sholak Palace of Culture and Sports, Almaty

5 July 2007; 18:30	Kazakhstan	31–25	Chinese Taipei	Baluan Sholak Palace of Culture and Sports, Almaty

=== Bronze medal match ===
7 July 2007; 16:30	Japan	33–34	Chinese Taipei	Baluan Sholak Palace of Culture and Sports, Almaty
7 July 2007; 16:30		(15–18)		Baluan Sholak Palace of Culture and Sports, Almaty

=== Gold medal match ===
7 July 2007; 18:30	South Korea	40–27	Kazakhstan	Baluan Sholak Palace of Culture and Sports, Almaty
7 July 2007; 18:30		(24–14)		Baluan Sholak Palace of Culture and Sports, Almaty

== Final standing ==
Rank	Team
1st place, gold medalist(s)	South Korea
2nd place, silver medalist(s)	Kazakhstan
3rd place, bronze medalist(s)	Chinese Taipei
4	Japan
5	China
6	Qatar
7	Iran

Team qualified for the 2008 Junior World Championship
