= Ookini Arena Maishima =

Sporting arena located in Osaka, Japan

Coordinates: 34°39′56.26″N 135°23′51.36″E

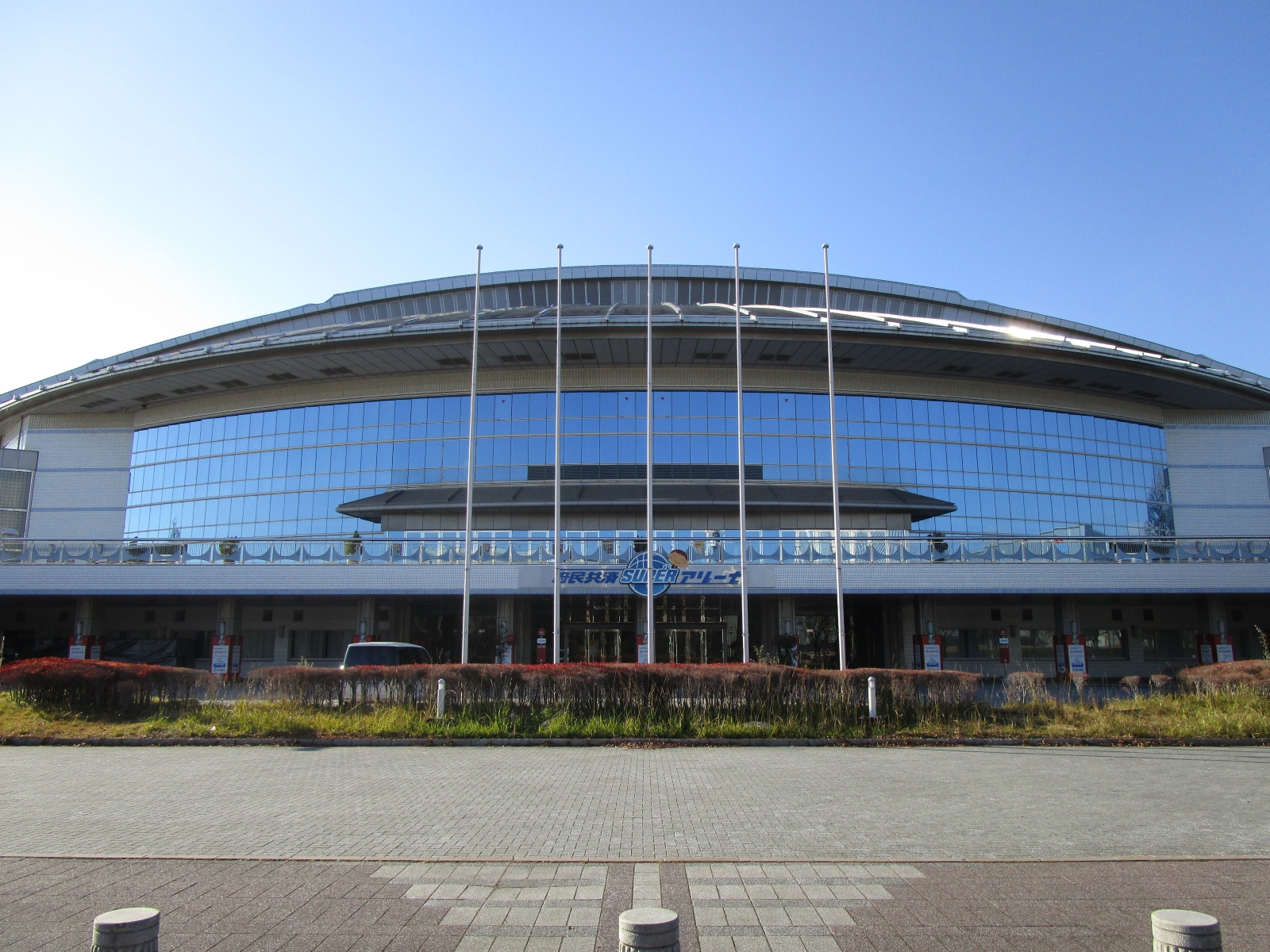
- Interactive map of Ookini Arena Maishima
- Former names: Maishima Arena; Fumin Kyosai Super Arena
- Location: Konohana-ku, Osaka
- Owner: City of Osaka
- Operator: Human Planning
- Capacity: 7,056

Construction
- Opened: 1996
- Main contractor: Kajima

Tenant
- Osaka Evessa (B.League)(2004–present)

Website
- https://human-arena.com/

Ookini Arena Maishima is an indoor sporting arena located in Osaka, Japan. The capacity of the arena is 7,000 people.

Since 2004, it has been the home arena and the practice facilities for the Osaka Evessa, a professional basketball team of the B.League.

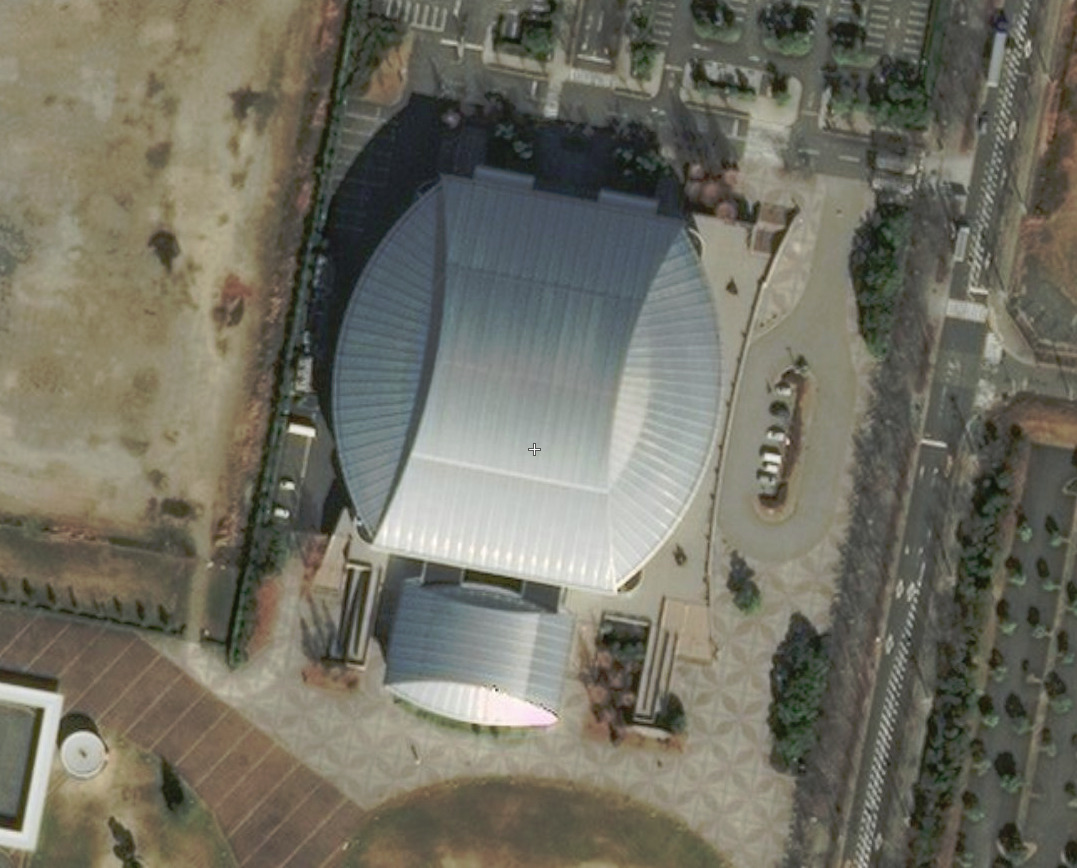
Satellite view
