= SK Sugar Gliders =

Handball club in Gwangmyeong, South Korea

- Full name: SK Sugar Gliders Women's Handball Club
- Founded: 2012; 14 years ago
- League: H League
- 2025–26: Regular season: 1st Playoffs: Champions

SK Sugar Gliders is a South Korean women's handball club based in Gwangmyeong. The club was established in 2012.

== Honours ==
- H League

Winners (5): 2017, 2019–20, 2023–24, 2024–25, 2025–26
Runners-up (1): 2018–19

- Asian Women's Club League Handball Championship

Winners (2): 2022, 2023

- Korea-Japan Handball Club Super Match

Winners (1): 2026
