= 2000 Asian Women's Junior Handball Championship =

2000 handball championship in Asia

2000 Asian Junior Championship
Tournament details
- Host country: Bangladesh
- Venue(s): 1 (in 1 host city)
- Dates: 25–31 July 2000
- Teams: 7

Final positions
- Champions: South Korea (6th title)
- Runners-up: Chinese Taipei
- Third place: Japan
- Fourth place: China

Tournament statistics
- Matches played: 14

The 2000 Asian Women's Junior Handball Championship (6th tournament) took place in Dhaka from 25 July–31 July. It acts as the Asian qualifying tournament for the 2001 Women's Junior World Handball Championship.

== Draw ==
Group A	Group B
South Korea; Chinese Taipei; India; Nepal	Japan; China; Bangladesh

== Preliminary round ==
=== Group A ===
Team	Pld	W	D	L	GF	GA	GD	Pts
South Korea	3	3	0	0	101	41	+60	6
Chinese Taipei	3	2	0	1	102	61	+41	4
India	3	1	0	2	65	76	−11	2
Nepal	3	0	0	3	26	116	−90	0

25 July 2000	South Korea	32–26	Chinese Taipei	Shaheed Suhrawardy Indoor Stadium, Dhaka

25 July 2000	Nepal	8–39	India	Shaheed Suhrawardy Indoor Stadium, Dhaka

26 July 2000	Nepal	12–37	Chinese Taipei	Shaheed Suhrawardy Indoor Stadium, Dhaka

26 July 2000	South Korea	29–9	India	Shaheed Suhrawardy Indoor Stadium, Dhaka

27 July 2000	South Korea	40–6	Nepal	Shaheed Suhrawardy Indoor Stadium, Dhaka

27 July 2000	Chinese Taipei	39–17	India	Shaheed Suhrawardy Indoor Stadium, Dhaka

=== Group B ===
Team	Pld	W	D	L	GF	GA	GD	Pts
China	2	2	0	0	48	30	+18	4
Japan	2	1	0	1	62	29	+33	2
Bangladesh	2	0	0	2	22	73	−51	0

25 July 2000	China	29–12	Bangladesh	Shaheed Suhrawardy Indoor Stadium, Dhaka

26 July 2000	Bangladesh	10–44	Japan	Shaheed Suhrawardy Indoor Stadium, Dhaka

27 July 2000	China	19–18	Japan	Shaheed Suhrawardy Indoor Stadium, Dhaka

== Placement 5th/6th ==
30 July 2000	India	–	Bangladesh	Shaheed Suhrawardy Indoor Stadium, Dhaka

== Final round ==
Semifinals
29 July – Dhaka
South Korea	33
Japan	14
29 July – Dhaka
China	22
Chinese Taipei	25

Gold medal match
31 July – Dhaka
South Korea	37
Chinese Taipei	23
Bronze medal match
31 July – Dhaka
Japan	25
China	16

=== Semifinals ===
29 July 2000	South Korea	33–14	Japan	Shaheed Suhrawardy Indoor Stadium, Dhaka
29 July 2000		(17–6)		Shaheed Suhrawardy Indoor Stadium, Dhaka

29 July 2000	China	22–25	Chinese Taipei	Shaheed Suhrawardy Indoor Stadium, Dhaka
29 July 2000		(11–9)		Shaheed Suhrawardy Indoor Stadium, Dhaka

=== Bronze medal match ===
31 July 2000	Japan	25–16	China	Shaheed Suhrawardy Indoor Stadium, Dhaka
31 July 2000		(9–12)		Shaheed Suhrawardy Indoor Stadium, Dhaka

=== Gold medal match ===
31 July 2000	South Korea	37–23	Chinese Taipei	Shaheed Suhrawardy Indoor Stadium, Dhaka

== Final standing ==
Rank	Team
1st place, gold medalist(s)	South Korea
2nd place, silver medalist(s)	Chinese Taipei
3rd place, bronze medalist(s)	Japan
4	China
5	India
6	Bangladesh
7	Nepal

Team qualified for the 2001 Junior World Championship
