= Asian Women's Junior Handball Championship =

Handball championship in Asia

AHF Asian Women's Junior Handball Championship
- Current season, competition or edition: 2025 Asian Women's Junior Handball Championship
- Sport: Handball
- Founder: Asian Handball Federation
- First season: 1990
- Confederation: Asia
- Most recent champion: Japan (1st title)
- Most titles: South Korea (16 titles)
- Related competitions: Asian Men's Junior Handball Championship

The Asian Women's Junior Handball Championship is the official competition for junior women's national handball teams of Asia, and takes place every two years. In addition to crowning the Asian champions, the tournament also serves as a qualifying tournament for the IHF Women's Junior World Championship.

== Summary ==
Year	Host	Final			Third place match		
Year	Host	Champion	Score	Runner-up	Third place	Score	Fourth place
1990; Details	(China); Hefei	South Korea	No playoffs	Chinese Taipei	China	No playoffs	Japan
1992; Details	(China); Beijing	South Korea	No playoffs	North Korea	China	No playoffs	Japan
1995; Details	(South Korea); Seoul	South Korea	No playoffs	China	Japan	No playoffs	Chinese Taipei
1996; Details	(China); Chengdu	South Korea	No playoffs	China	Japan	No playoffs	None awarded
1998; Details	(Japan); Osaka	South Korea	No playoffs	China	Kazakhstan	No playoffs	Japan
2000; Details	(Bangladesh); Dhaka	South Korea	37–23	Chinese Taipei	Japan	25–16	China
2002; Details	(Jordan); Amman	South Korea	No playoffs	China	Japan	No playoffs	Chinese Taipei
2004; Details	(Thailand); Bangkok	South Korea	No playoffs	Japan	China	No playoffs	Chinese Taipei
2007; Details	(Kazakhstan); Almaty	South Korea	40–27	Kazakhstan	Chinese Taipei	34–33	Japan
2009; Details	(Thailand); Bangkok	South Korea	No playoffs	Japan	China	No playoffs	Thailand
2011; Details	(Kazakhstan); Almaty	South Korea	32–15	China	Kazakhstan	39–31	Japan
2013; Details	(Kazakhstan); Almaty	South Korea	No playoffs	Japan	China	No playoffs	Kazakhstan
2015; Details	(Kazakhstan); Almaty	South Korea	No playoffs	Japan	Kazakhstan	No playoffs	China
2017; Details	(Hong Kong); Tsim Sha Tsui	South Korea	No playoffs	China	Japan	No playoffs	Kazakhstan
2019; Details	(Lebanon); Beirut	South Korea	26–19	Japan	China	34–17	Lebanon
2022; Details	(Kazakhstan); Almaty	India	No playoffs	Iran	Kazakhstan	No playoffs	Uzbekistan
2023; Details	(Hong Kong); Tsim Sha Tsui	South Korea	34–15	China	Japan	43–23	Chinese Taipei
2025; Details	(Uzbekistan); Tashkent	Japan	20–18	South Korea	China	22–17	Chinese Taipei

== Medal table ==
Rank	Nation	Gold	Silver	Bronze	Total
1	South Korea	16	1	0	17
2	Japan	1	5	6	12
3	India	1	0	0	1
4	China	0	7	7	14
5	Chinese Taipei	0	2	1	3
6	Kazakhstan	0	1	4	5
7	Iran	0	1	0	1
7	North Korea	0	1	0	1
Totals (8 entries)		18	18	18	54

== Participating nations ==
Nation	(China) 1990	(China) 1992	(South Korea) 1995	(China) 1996	(Japan) 1998	(Bangladesh) 2000	(Jordan) 2002	(Thailand) 2004	(Kazakhstan) 2007	(Thailand) 2009	(Kazakhstan) 2011	(Kazakhstan) 2013	(Kazakhstan) 2015	(Hong Kong) 2017	(Lebanon) 2019	(Kazakhstan) 2022	(Hong Kong) 2023	(Uzbekistan) 2025	Years
Bangladesh						6th													1
China	3rd	3rd	2nd	2nd	2nd	4th	2nd	3rd	5th	3rd	2nd	3rd	4th	2nd	3rd		2nd	3rd	17
Chinese Taipei	2nd	5th	4th		5th	2nd	4th	4th	3rd		5th				5th		4th	4th	12
Hong Kong										5th	8th			6th			8th	8th	5
India	5th					5th								7th	8th	1st	9th	5th	7
Iran									7th		6th		6th			2nd	5th	6th	6
Japan	4th	4th	3rd	3rd	4th	3rd	3rd	2nd	4th	2nd	4th	2nd	2nd	3rd	2nd		3rd	1st	17
Jordan							5th												1
Kazakhstan					3rd			6th	2nd		3rd	4th	3rd	4th	6th	3rd	6th	7th	11
Kuwait																	10th		1
Kyrgyzstan																		9th	1
Lebanon															4th				1
Nepal						7th													1
North Korea		2nd																	1
Qatar									6th										1
South Korea	1st	1st	1st	1st	1st	1st	1st	1st	1st	1st	1st	1st	1st	1st	1st		1st	2nd	17
Thailand								5th		4th						5th			3
Uzbekistan											7th	5th	5th	5th	7th	4th	7th	DSQ	8
Total	5	5	4	3	5	7	5	6	7	5	8	5	6	7	8	5	10	10	

== See also ==
- Asian Women's Handball Championship
- Asian Women's Youth Handball Championship
- Asian Men's Handball Championship
- Asian Men's Junior Handball Championship
- Asian Men's Youth Handball Championship
