= 2017 Asian Women's Club League Handball Championship =

- Logo of 2nd Asian Women's Club League Handball Championship

Tournament details
- Host country: Uzbekistan
- Venue: 1 (in 1 host city)
- Dates: 23 – 29 September 2017
- Teams: 6 (from 1 confederation)

Final positions
- Champions: (Uzbekistan) AGMK Club (1st title)
- Runners-up: (Kazakhstan) Ile Club
- Third place: (Kazakhstan) Almaty Club
- Fourth place: (Iran) Larestan Club

Tournament statistics
- Matches played: 15
- Goals scored: 906 (60.4 per match)

The 2017 Asian Women's Club League Handball Championship was the second edition of the competition held from 23 to 29 September 2017 at Uzbekistan Sports Complex in Tashkent (Uzbekistan). It was organised by the Handball Federation of Uzbekistan under the aegis of Asian Handball Federation. It was the official competition for women's handball clubs of Asia crowning the Asian champions.

== Participating teams ==
Country	Previous appearances
(Kazakhstan) Ile Club	1 (2016)
(Uzbekistan) Uzbechka Club	1 (2016)
(Kazakhstan) Almaty Club	1 (2016)
(Uzbekistan) AGMK Club	0 (debut)
(Iran) Larestan Club	0 (debut)
India Club	0 (debut)

^{1} Bold indicates champion for that year. Italics indicates host.

== Round-Robin ==
Team	Pld	W	D	L	GF	GA	GD	Pts
(Uzbekistan) AGMK Club	5	4	1	0	178	132	+46	9
(Kazakhstan) Ile Club	5	4	1	0	192	152	+40	9
(Kazakhstan) Almaty Club	5	3	0	2	138	120	+18	6
(Iran) Larestan Club	5	2	0	3	124	127	−3	4
(Uzbekistan) Uzbechka Club	5	1	0	4	145	177	−32	2
India Club	5	0	0	5	129	198	−69	0

== Match Results ==
23 September 2017; 14:00	**Ile Club (Kazakhstan)**	**36 – 36**	**(Uzbekistan) AGMK Club**	Uzbekistan Sports Complex, Tashkent
23 September 2017; 14:00		(16 – 16)		Uzbekistan Sports Complex, Tashkent

23 September 2017; 16:00	**Almaty Club (Kazakhstan)**	**23 – 19**	**(Iran) Larestan Club**	Uzbekistan Sports Complex, Tashkent
23 September 2017; 16:00		(9 – 10)		Uzbekistan Sports Complex, Tashkent

23 September 2017; 19:00	**Uzbechka Club (Uzbekistan)**	**37 – 31**	**India Club**	Uzbekistan Sports Complex, Tashkent
23 September 2017; 19:00		(20 – 12)		Uzbekistan Sports Complex, Tashkent

24 September 2017; 14:00	**Almaty Club (Kazakhstan)**	**27 – 32**	**(Kazakhstan) Ile Club**	Uzbekistan Sports Complex, Tashkent
24 September 2017; 14:00		(16 – 16)		Uzbekistan Sports Complex, Tashkent

24 September 2017; 16:00	**Larestan Club (Iran)**	**23 – 20**	**(Uzbekistan) Uzbechka Club**	Uzbekistan Sports Complex, Tashkent
24 September 2017; 16:00		(12 – 8)		Uzbekistan Sports Complex, Tashkent

24 September 2017; 18:00	**AGMK Club (Uzbekistan)**	**45 – 27**	**India Club**	Uzbekistan Sports Complex, Tashkent
24 September 2017; 18:00		(23 – 14)		Uzbekistan Sports Complex, Tashkent

26 September 2017; 14:00	**India Club**	**19 – 32**	**(Kazakhstan) Almaty Club**	Uzbekistan Sports Complex, Tashkent
26 September 2017; 14:00		(9 – 10)		Uzbekistan Sports Complex, Tashkent

26 September 2017; 16:00	**Ile Club (Kazakhstan)**	**30 – 27**	**(Iran) Larestan Club**	Uzbekistan Sports Complex, Tashkent
26 September 2017; 16:00		(11 – 11)		Uzbekistan Sports Complex, Tashkent

26 September 2017; 18:00	**Uzbechka Club (Uzbekistan)**	**27 – 44**	**(Uzbekistan) AGMK Club**	Uzbekistan Sports Complex, Tashkent
26 September 2017; 18:00		(13 – 17)		Uzbekistan Sports Complex, Tashkent

27 September 2017; 14:00	**Larestan Club (Iran)**	**35 – 24**	**India Club**	Uzbekistan Sports Complex, Tashkent
27 September 2017; 14:00		(18 – 9)		Uzbekistan Sports Complex, Tashkent

27 September 2017; 16:00	**Ile Club (Kazakhstan)**	**45 – 34**	**(Uzbekistan) Uzbechka Club**	Uzbekistan Sports Complex, Tashkent
27 September 2017; 16:00		(19 – 16)		Uzbekistan Sports Complex, Tashkent

27 September 2017; 18:00	**AGMK Club (Uzbekistan)**	**23 – 22**	**(Kazakhstan) Almaty Club**	Uzbekistan Sports Complex, Tashkent
27 September 2017; 18:00		(9 – 9)		Uzbekistan Sports Complex, Tashkent

29 September 2017; 14:00	**India Club**	**28 — 49**	**(Kazakhstan) Ile Club**	Uzbekistan Sports Complex, Tashkent
29 September 2017; 14:00		(14 — 25)		Uzbekistan Sports Complex, Tashkent

29 September 2017; 16:00	**AGMK Club (Uzbekistan)**	**30 — 20**	**(Iran) Larestan Club**	Uzbekistan Sports Complex, Tashkent
29 September 2017; 16:00		(13 — 13)		Uzbekistan Sports Complex, Tashkent

29 September 2017; 18:00	**Uzbechka Club (Uzbekistan)**	**27 — 34**	**(Kazakhstan) Almaty Club**	Uzbekistan Sports Complex, Tashkent
29 September 2017; 18:00		(14 — 16)		Uzbekistan Sports Complex, Tashkent

== Final standings ==
Rank	Team
1st place, gold medalist(s)	(Uzbekistan) AGMK Club
2nd place, silver medalist(s)	(Kazakhstan) Ile Club
3rd place, bronze medalist(s)	(Kazakhstan) Almaty Club
4	(Iran) Larestan Club
5	(Uzbekistan) Uzbechka Club
6	India Club
