= 2018 Asian Women's Club League Handball Championship =

Tournament details
- Host country: Kazakhstan
- Venue(s): 1 (in 1 host city)
- Dates: 3–9 October
- Teams: 6 (from 1 confederation)

Final positions
- Champions: (Kazakhstan) Almaty Club (1st title)
- Runner-up: (Kazakhstan) Kaysar Club
- Third place: (Kazakhstan) Astana Club
- Fourth place: (Uzbekistan) Uzbechka Club

Tournament statistics
- Matches played: 15
- Goals scored: 910 (60.67 per match)

Awards
- Best player: Irina Alexandrova (Almaty Club)

The 2018 Asian Women's Club League Handball Championship was an international handball tournament held between 3 and 9 October 2018 in Almaty, Kazakhstan. It was organized by the Asian Handball Federation.

== Participating teams ==
Country	Previous appearances
(Kazakhstan) Almaty Club	2 (2016, 2017)
(Uzbekistan) Uzbechka Club	2 (2016, 2017)
(Kazakhstan) Kaysar Club	1 (**2016**)
(Iran) Larestan Club	1 (2017)
(Kazakhstan) Astana Club	0 (debut)
(India) T-Sports Club	0 (debut)

^{1} Bold indicates champion for that year. Italics indicates host.

== Results ==
All times are local (UTC+6).

Pos	Team	Pld	W	D	L	GF	GA	GD	Pts
1	(Kazakhstan) Almaty Club (H)	5	5	0	0	175	113	+62	10
2	(Kazakhstan) Kaysar Club	5	4	0	1	175	135	+40	8
3	(Kazakhstan) Astana Club	5	3	0	2	189	160	+29	6
4	(Uzbekistan) Uzbechka Club	5	2	0	3	150	163	−13	4
5	(Iran) Larestan Club	5	1	0	4	128	153	−25	2
6	(India) T-Sports Club	5	0	0	5	93	186	−93	0

Source: AHF
(H) Hosts

3 October 2018; 14:00	**Kaysar Club (Kazakhstan)**	**42–25**	**(Iran) Larestan Club**	Universal Sports Complex Dostyk, Almaty; Referees: Liu, Xu (CHN)
3 October 2018; 14:00	Abilda, Isachenko 9	(20–14)	Janbaz, Rajabi 6	Universal Sports Complex Dostyk, Almaty; Referees: Liu, Xu (CHN)

3 October 2018; 16:00	**Uzbechka Club (Uzbekistan)**	**31–48**	**(Kazakhstan) Astana Club**	Universal Sports Complex Dostyk, Almaty; Referees: Lee, Lee (KOR)
3 October 2018; 16:00	Khalmuratova 9	(13–25)	Ilyina, Zhaparova 12	Universal Sports Complex Dostyk, Almaty; Referees: Lee, Lee (KOR)

3 October 2018; 19:00	**Almaty Club (Kazakhstan)**	**47–12**	**(India) T-Sports Club**	Universal Sports Complex Dostyk, Almaty; Referees: Mohamed, Al-Muhafdeh (BHR)
3 October 2018; 19:00	Karavayeva 10	(27–4)	Pathak 5	Universal Sports Complex Dostyk, Almaty; Referees: Mohamed, Al-Muhafdeh (BHR)

4 October 2018; 14:00	**Uzbechka Club (Uzbekistan)**	**30–38**	**(Kazakhstan) Kaysar Club**	Universal Sports Complex Dostyk, Almaty; Referees: Mohamed, Al-Muhafdeh (BHR)
4 October 2018; 14:00	Bahromova 8	(12–17)	Pupchenkova 9	Universal Sports Complex Dostyk, Almaty; Referees: Mohamed, Al-Muhafdeh (BHR)

4 October 2018; 16:00	**Astana Club (Kazakhstan)**	**25–35**	**(Kazakhstan) Almaty Club**	Universal Sports Complex Dostyk, Almaty; Referees: Lee, Lee (KOR)
4 October 2018; 16:00	Ilyina 7	(9–16)	Alexandrova 13	Universal Sports Complex Dostyk, Almaty; Referees: Lee, Lee (KOR)

4 October 2018; 18:00	**Larestan Club (Iran)**	**31–14**	**(India) T-Sports Club**	Universal Sports Complex Dostyk, Almaty; Referees: Yuldashev, Artyom (KAZ)
4 October 2018; 18:00	Tootoonsiz 6	(19–8)	Kaur 6	Universal Sports Complex Dostyk, Almaty; Referees: Yuldashev, Artyom (KAZ)

6 October 2018; 14:00	**T-Sports Club (India)**	**20–34**	**(Uzbekistan) Uzbechka Club**	Universal Sports Complex Dostyk, Almaty; Referees: Yuldashev, Artyom (KAZ)
6 October 2018; 14:00	Kaur 8	(10–19)	Abdumannonova 8	Universal Sports Complex Dostyk, Almaty; Referees: Yuldashev, Artyom (KAZ)

6 October 2018; 16:00	**Kaysar Club (Kazakhstan)**	**38–33**	**(Kazakhstan) Astana Club**	Universal Sports Complex Dostyk, Almaty; Referees: Lee, Lee (KOR)
6 October 2018; 16:00	Isachenko 13	(20–17)	Kapralova 8	Universal Sports Complex Dostyk, Almaty; Referees: Lee, Lee (KOR)

6 October 2018; 18:00	**Almaty Club (Kazakhstan)**	**31–21**	**(Iran) Larestan Club**	Universal Sports Complex Dostyk, Almaty; Referees: Liu, Xu (CHN)
6 October 2018; 18:00	Khardina 8	(17–11)	Rajabi, Tootoonsiz 5	Universal Sports Complex Dostyk, Almaty; Referees: Liu, Xu (CHN)

7 October 2018; 14:00	**Astana Club (Kazakhstan)**	**43–27**	**(India) T-Sports Club**	Universal Sports Complex Dostyk, Almaty; Referees: Liu, Xu (CHN)
7 October 2018; 14:00	Serikbayeva 12	(27–14)	Gupta 9	Universal Sports Complex Dostyk, Almaty; Referees: Liu, Xu (CHN)

7 October 2018; 16:00	**Larestan Club (Iran)**	**22–26**	**(Uzbekistan) Uzbechka Club**	Universal Sports Complex Dostyk, Almaty; Referees: Lee, Lee (KOR)
7 October 2018; 16:00	six players 3	(10–12)	Khalmuratova 11	Universal Sports Complex Dostyk, Almaty; Referees: Lee, Lee (KOR)

7 October 2018; 18:00	**Kaysar Club (Kazakhstan)**	**26–27**	**(Kazakhstan) Almaty Club**	Universal Sports Complex Dostyk, Almaty; Referees: Mohamed, Al-Muhafdeh (BHR)
7 October 2018; 18:00	Abilda, Poluyanko 8	(16–14)	Yakuba 8	Universal Sports Complex Dostyk, Almaty; Referees: Mohamed, Al-Muhafdeh (BHR)

9 October 2018; 12:00	**T-Sports Club (India)**	**20–31**	**(Kazakhstan) Kaysar Club**	Universal Sports Complex Dostyk, Almaty; Referees: Yuldashev, Artyom (KAZ)
9 October 2018; 12:00	Shukla 5	(13–15)	Malysheva 13	Universal Sports Complex Dostyk, Almaty; Referees: Yuldashev, Artyom (KAZ)

9 October 2018; 14:00	**Larestan Club (Iran)**	**29–40**	**(Kazakhstan) Astana Club**	Universal Sports Complex Dostyk, Almaty; Referees: Lee, Lee (KOR)
9 October 2018; 14:00	Tootoonsiz 7	(14–23)	Kazachenko 7	Universal Sports Complex Dostyk, Almaty; Referees: Lee, Lee (KOR)

9 October 2018; 16:00	**Almaty Club (Kazakhstan)**	**35–29**	**(Uzbekistan) Uzbechka Club**	Universal Sports Complex Dostyk, Almaty; Referees: Mohamed, Al-Muhafdeh (BHR)
9 October 2018; 16:00	Tankina 10	(20–14)	Khalmuratova 12	Universal Sports Complex Dostyk, Almaty; Referees: Mohamed, Al-Muhafdeh (BHR)
