= Uzbekistan women's national handball team =

Uzbekistan

Information
- Association: Handball Federation of Uzbekistan
- Coach: Zafar Azimov
- Assistant coach: Ismoiljon Ahmedov; Zinaida Penkova
- Captain: Anastasiya Mustafaeva

Colours
1st	2nd

Results

World Championship
- Appearances: 2 (First in 1997)
- Best result: 21st (1997)

Asian Championship
- Appearances: 9 (First in 1997)
- Best result: 4th (1997)
- Last updated on Unknown.

The Uzbekistan women's national handball team is the national team of Uzbekistan. It takes part in international handball competitions.

The team participated in the 1997 World Women's Handball Championship, placing 21st.

== Results ==
=== Olympic Games ===
Handball at the 2016 Summer Olympics – Asian women's qualification tournament

=== World Championship ===
- 1997 – 21st
- 2021 – 30th

=== Asian Championship ===
- 1997 – 4th
- 2002 – 7th
- 2008 – 9th
- 2010 – 6th
- 2012 – 6th
- 2015 – 5th
- 2017 – 5th
- 2021 – 5th
- 2022 – 8th
- 2024 – Withdrawn
- 2026 – Qualified

=== Asian Games ===
Handball at the Asian Games

1. Handball at the 2006 Asian Games
2. Handball at the 2014 Asian Games
3. Handball at the 2022 Asian Games
4. Handball at the 2026 Asian Games

== Current squad ==
Squad for the 2021 World Women's Handball Championship.

Head coach: Zafar Azimov

No.	Pos.	Name	Date of birth (age)	Height	App.	Goals	Club
1	GK	Sarvinoz Sultonova	2 March 1998 (age 28)	1.78 m	12	20
2	CB	Madina Khudoykulova	26 December 2001 (age 24)	1.58 m	8	200
3	LW	Mekhriniso Mukhamadova	27 May 2001 (age 25)	1.65 m	8	40
4	RB	Khusniya Safarova	1 January 1999 (age 27)	1.70 m	5	25
5	P	Zukhra Botirova	20 July 2002 (age 24)	1.68 m	4	16
6	CB	Zilola Mirzaeva	21 April 2002 (age 24)	1.57 m	9	64
7	P	Nargiza Yusupova	12 July 2000 (age 26)	1.75 m	6	35
8	RB	Anastasiya Mustafaeva	23 October 1986 (age 40)	1.67 m	16	200
9	LB	Zakhro Allayarova	27 July 1997 (age 29)	1.57 m	12	100
10	CB	Dilnoza Sultanova	23 April 2001 (age 25)	1.70 m	7	35
11	CB	Sevara Razakbergenova	26 March 1998 (age 28)	1.72 m	10	60
12	GK	Tuoryim Mamirova	3 September 2002 (age 24)	1.76 m	3	15
13	LB	Charos Obidjonova	13 November 2002 (age 23)	1.68 m	6	25
14	CB	Dilbarhon Bahromova	6 October 1993 (age 33)	1.63 m	20	400
15	LB	Oyazimkhon Abdumannonova	12 January 2000 (age 26)	1.66 m	12	192
17	RB	Maftunakhon Vosiljonova	1 January 2000 (age 26)	1.59 m	10	60
