= 2016 Asian Women's Club League Handball Championship =

- Logo of 1st Asian Women's Club League Handball Championship

Tournament details
- Host country: Kazakhstan
- Venue: 1 (in 1 host city)
- Dates: 26 October - 1 November 2016
- Teams: 6 (from 1 confederation)

Final positions
- Champions: (Kazakhstan) Kaysar Club (1st title)
- Runners-up: (Kazakhstan) Almaty Club
- Third place: (Kazakhstan) Ile Club
- Fourth place: (Uzbekistan) Uzbechka Club

Tournament statistics
- Matches played: 15
- Goals scored: 861 (57.4 per match)

The 2016 Asian Women's Club League Handball Championship was the first edition of the Asian Women's Club League Handball Championship held from 26 October to 1 November 2016 at Kyzylorda, Kazakhstan under the aegis of Asian Handball Federation. It is the official competition for women's handball clubs of Asia crowning the Asian champions.

== Participating teams ==
1. (Kazakhstan) Ile Club
2. (Uzbekistan) Uzbechka Club
3. (Kazakhstan) Almaty Club
4. (Kazakhstan) Kaysar Club
5. Qatar
6. (Iran) Shahrdari Sanandaj Club

== Round-Robin ==
Team	Pld	W	D	L	GF	GA	GD	Pts
(Kazakhstan) Kaysar Club	5	5	0	0	172	117	+55	10
(Kazakhstan) Almaty Club	5	4	0	1	140	113	+27	8
(Kazakhstan) Ile Club	5	3	0	2	172	142	+30	6
(Uzbekistan) Uzbechka Club	5	2	0	3	140	167	−27	4
(Iran) Shahrdari Sanandaj Club	5	1	0	4	125	157	−32	2
Qatar SC	5	0	0	5	112	165	−53	0

== Match results ==
26 October 2016; 14:00	Uzbechka (Uzbekistan)	32-22	Qatar SC	Kyzylorda, Kazakhstan
26 October 2016; 14:00		(19-12)		Kyzylorda, Kazakhstan

26 October 2016; 16:00	Ile Club (Kazakhstan)	41-23	(Iran) Sanandaj Club	Kyzylorda, Kazakhstan
26 October 2016; 16:00		(22-11)		Kyzylorda, Kazakhstan

26 October 2016; 19:00	Almaty Club (Kazakhstan)	20-23	(Kazakhstan) Kaysar	Kyzylorda, Kazakhstan
26 October 2016; 19:00		(9-11)		Kyzylorda, Kazakhstan

27 October 2016; 14:00	Uzbechka (Uzbekistan)	22-31	(Kazakhstan) Almaty Club	Kyzylorda, Kazakhstan
27 October 2016; 14:00		(15-13)		Kyzylorda, Kazakhstan

27 October 2016; 16:00	Qatar SC	19-35	(Kazakhstan) Ile Club	Kyzylorda, Kazakhstan
27 October 2016; 16:00		(7-18)		Kyzylorda, Kazakhstan

27 October 2016; 18:00	Kaysar (Kazakhstan)	28-24	(Iran) Sanandaj Club	Kyzylorda, Kazakhstan
27 October 2016; 18:00		(20-10)		Kyzylorda, Kazakhstan

29 October 2016; 14:00	Almaty Club (Kazakhstan)	30-23	Qatar SC	Kyzylorda, Kazakhstan
29 October 2016; 14:00		(17-15)		Kyzylorda, Kazakhstan

29 October 2016; 16:00	Sanandaj Club (Iran)	28-32	(Uzbekistan) Uzbechka	Kyzylorda, Kazakhstan
29 October 2016; 16:00		(11-15)		Kyzylorda, Kazakhstan

29 October 2016; 18:00	Ile Club (Kazakhstan)	25-43	(Kazakhstan) Kaysar	Kyzylorda, Kazakhstan
29 October 2016; 18:00		(13-22)		Kyzylorda, Kazakhstan

30 October 2016; 14:00	Almaty Club (Kazakhstan)	30-26	(Kazakhstan) Ile Club	Kyzylorda, Kazakhstan
30 October 2016; 14:00		(15-12)		Kyzylorda, Kazakhstan

30 October 2016; 16:00	Qatar SC	27-31	(Iran) Sanandaj Club	Kyzylorda, Kazakhstan
30 October 2016; 16:00		(11-12)		Kyzylorda, Kazakhstan

30 October 2016; 18:00	Kaysar (Kazakhstan)	41-27	(Uzbekistan) Uzbechka	Kyzylorda, Kazakhstan
30 October 2016; 18:00		(19-16)		Kyzylorda, Kazakhstan

1 November 2016; 14:00	Sanandaj Club (Iran)	19-29	(Kazakhstan) Almaty Club	Kyzylorda, Kazakhstan
1 November 2016; 14:00		(8-17)		Kyzylorda, Kazakhstan

1 November 2016; 16:00	Ile Club (Kazakhstan)	45-27	(Uzbekistan) Uzbechka	Kyzylorda, Kazakhstan
1 November 2016; 16:00		(21-12)		Kyzylorda, Kazakhstan

1 November 2016; 18:00	Kaysar (Kazakhstan)	37-21	Qatar SC	Kyzylorda, Kazakhstan
1 November 2016; 18:00		(19-10)		Kyzylorda, Kazakhstan

== Final standings ==
Rank	Team
1st place, gold medalist(s)	(Kazakhstan) Kaysar Club (1st title)
2nd place, silver medalist(s)	(Kazakhstan) Almaty Club
3rd place, bronze medalist(s)	(Kazakhstan) Ile Club
4	(Uzbekistan) Uzbechka Club
5	(Iran) Shahrdari Sanandaj Club
6	Qatar SC
