= List of Australian national handball team games =

List of International games played by the Australia Men's national handball team since 1994.

== Games 1-50 ==
No.	Date	Venue	Place	Opponent	Goals for	Goals against	Competition
1	20/05/1994		Luxembourg	Luxembourg	23	21	Friendly
2	20/08/1994	AIS Arena	Canberra, Australia	New Zealand	36	12	1994 Oceania Handball Championship
3	21/08/1994	AIS Arena	Canberra, Australia	New Zealand	23	10	1994 Oceania Handball Championship
4	20/12/1994		Bucharest, Romania	Romania	5	43	HWC Qualifications - Iceland 1995
5	21/12/1994		Bucharest, Romania	Romania	18	25	HWC Qualifications - Iceland 1995
6	1/06/1995		Liege, Belgium	Belgium			Friendly
7	1/06/1995		Liege, Belgium	Belgium			Friendly
8	1/05/1996		Kumamoto, Japan	Iceland	19	29	Japan Cup - Kumamoto 1996
9	2/05/1996		Kumamoto, Japan	Japan	13	19	Japan Cup - Kumamoto 1996
10	3/05/1996		Kumamoto, Japan	United States	16	26	Japan Cup - Kumamoto 1996
11	5/05/1996		Kumamoto, Japan	China	20	27	Japan Cup - Kumamoto 1996
12	8/12/1996	Te Rauparana Arena	Porirua, New Zealand	New Zealand	19	13	1996 Oceania Handball Championship
13	9/12/1996	Te Rauparana Arena	Porirua, New Zealand	New Zealand	29	20	1996 Oceania Handball Championship
14	31/01/1997	State Sports Centre	Sydney, Australia	Lithuania	13	27	HWC Qualifications - Japan 1997
15	2/02/1997	State Sports Centre	Sydney, Australia	Lithuania	15	30	HWC Qualifications - Japan 1997
16	1/05/1998	Százhalombatta Hall	Százhalombatta, Hungary	Hungary			Friendly
17	1/10/1998		Nagoya, Japan	Japan			Japan Cup 1998
18	1/06/1999		Cairo, Egypt	Argentina			Friendly
19	2/06/1999	Mubarak Hall	Port Said, Egypt	France	15	32	1999 World Men's Handball Championship
20	3/06/1999	Mubarak Hall	Port Said, Egypt	Yugoslavia	22	40	1999 World Men's Handball Championship
21	4/06/1999	Mubarak Hall	Port Said, Egypt	Sweden	17	49	1999 World Men's Handball Championship
22	6/06/1999	Mubarak Hall	Port Said, Egypt	China	29	33	1999 World Men's Handball Championship
23	7/06/1999	Mubarak Hall	Port Said, Egypt	South Korea	18	38	1999 World Men's Handball Championship
24	11/09/1999	Olympic Park	Sydney, Australia	Sweden	21	39	Olympic Test Event - Sydney 1999
25	12/09/1999	Olympic Park	Sydney, Australia	Japan	21	23	Olympic Test Event - Sydney 1999
26	13/09/1999	Olympic Park	Sydney, Australia	Belarus	25	37	Olympic Test Event - Sydney 1999
27	15/05/2000	Olympic Park	Sydney, Australia	Saudi Arabia			Friendly
28	1/09/2000	Olympic Park	Sydney, Australia	Cuba			Friendly
29	2/09/2000	Olympic Park	Sydney, Australia	Cuba			Friendly
30	16/09/2000	Sydney Olympic Park	Sydney, Australia	Sweden	23	44	Sydney 2000 Olympic Games
31	18/09/2000	Sydney Olympic Park	Sydney, Australia	Spain	23	39	Sydney 2000 Olympic Games
32	20/09/2000	Sydney Olympic Park	Sydney, Australia	Slovenia	20	33	Sydney 2000 Olympic Games
33	22/09/2000	Sydney Olympic Park	Sydney, Australia	Tunisia	24	34	Sydney 2000 Olympic Games
34	24/09/2000	Sydney Olympic Park	Sydney, Australia	France	16	28	Sydney 2000 Olympic Games
35	26/09/2000	Sydney Olympic Park	Sydney, Australia	Cuba	24	26	Sydney 2000 Olympic Games
36	1/05/2001		Kyoto, Japan	South Korea			Japan Cup 2001
37	2/05/2001		Kyoto, Japan	Japan			Japan Cup 2001
38	3/05/2001		Kyoto, Japan	Saudi Arabia			Japan Cup 2001
39	4/05/2001		Kyoto, Japan	China			Japan Cup 2001
40	21/05/2001	Sumiyoshi Sports Center	Osaka, Japan	China	16	28	2001 East Asian Games
41	22/05/2001	Sumiyoshi Sports Center	Osaka, Japan	Chinese Taipei	18	29	2001 East Asian Games
42	23/05/2001	Sumiyoshi Sports Center	Osaka, Japan	South Korea	16	36	2001 East Asian Games
43	25/05/2001	Sumiyoshi Sports Center	Osaka, Japan	Japan	10	26	2001 East Asian Games
44	26/05/2001	Sumiyoshi Sports Center	Osaka, Japan	Hong Kong	40	17	2001 East Asian Games
45	1/12/2001		Hong Kong, China	China			Friendly
46	1/12/2001		Hong Kong, China	Taiwan			Friendly
47	1/12/2001		Hong Kong, China	Singapore			Friendly
48	6/07/2002	Sleeman Centre	Brisbane, Australia	Cook Islands	35	7	2002 Oceania Handball Championship
49	7/07/2002	Sleeman Centre	Brisbane, Australia	Vanuatu	51	14	2002 Oceania Handball Championship
50	20/01/2003	Pavilhao Multiusos	Viseu, Portugal	Iceland	15	55	2003 World Men's Handball Championship

== Games 51-100 ==
No.	Date	Venue	Place	Opponent	Goals for	Goals against	Competition
51	21/01/2003	Pavilhao Multiusos	Viseu, Portugal	Germany	16	46	2003 World Men's Handball Championship
52	23/01/2003	Pavilhao Multiusos	Viseu, Portugal	Qatar	23	28	2003 World Men's Handball Championship
53	25/01/2003	Pavilhao Multiusos	Viseu, Portugal	Greenland	26	21	2003 World Men's Handball Championship
54	26/01/2003	Pavilhao Multiusos	Viseu, Portugal	Portugal	20	42	2003 World Men's Handball Championship
55	7/06/2004	State Sports Centre	Sydney, Australia	New Zealand	26	13	2004 Oceania Handball Championship
56	8/06/2004	State Sports Centre	Sydney, Australia	Cook Islands	48	13	2004 Oceania Handball Championship
57	9/06/2004	State Sports Centre	Sydney, Australia	New Caledonia	27	22	Friendly
58	10/06/2004	State Sports Centre	Sydney, Australia	French Polynesia	33	28	2004 Pacific Handball Cup
59	11/06/2004	State Sports Centre	Sydney, Australia	New Caledonia	24	18	Friendly
60	12/06/2004	State Sports Centre	Sydney, Australia	French Polynesia	29	19	2004 Pacific Handball Cup
61	13/06/2004	State Sports Centre	Sydney, Australia	New Caledonia	28	19	2004 Pacific Handball Cup
62	19/01/2005		Cairo, Egypt	Kuwait	20	22	Friendly
63	23/01/2005	Sports Hall "7 November"	Sfax, Tunisia	Sweden	16	49	2005 World Men's Handball Championship
64	24/01/2005	Sports Hall "7 November"	Sfax, Tunisia	Spain	19	51	2005 World Men's Handball Championship
65	26/01/2005	Sports Hall "7 November"	Sfax, Tunisia	Croatia	18	38	2005 World Men's Handball Championship
66	27/01/2005	Sports Hall "7 November"	Sfax, Tunisia	Argentina	13	34	2005 World Men's Handball Championship
67	28/01/2005	Sports Hall "7 November"	Sfax, Tunisia	Japan	19	29	2005 World Men's Handball Championship
68	22/05/2006	Dural Sports Centre	Sydney, Australia	New Zealand	41	14	2006 Oceania Handball Championship
69	23/05/2006	Dural Sports Centre	Sydney, Australia	Cook Islands	63	5	2006 Oceania Handball Championship
70	24/05/2006	Dural Sports Centre	Sydney, Australia	New Caledonia	30	19	Friendly
71	25/05/2006	Dural Sports Centre	Sydney, Australia	New Zealand	32	15	2006 Pacific Handball Cup
72	26/05/2006	Dural Sports Centre	Sydney, Australia	Cook Islands	52	6	2006 Pacific Handball Cup
73	27/05/2006	Dural Sports Centre	Sydney, Australia	New Caledonia	24	17	2006 Pacific Handball Cup
74	10/01/2007		Rødding, Denmark	Greenland	25	34	Friendly
75	11/01/2007		Rødding, Denmark	Great Britain	37	14	Friendly
76	12/01/2007		Rødding, Denmark	Great Britain	33	15	Friendly
77	13/01/2007		Rødding, Denmark	Iceland	19	35	Friendly
78	20/01/2007	Bördelandhalle	Magdeburg, Germany	Iceland	20	45	2007 World Men's Handball Championship
79	21/01/2007	Bördelandhalle	Magdeburg, Germany	France	10	47	2007 World Men's Handball Championship
80	22/01/2007	Bördelandhalle	Magdeburg, Germany	Ukraine	18	37	2007 World Men's Handball Championship
81	24/01/2007	Gerry Weber Stadion	Halle, Germany	Greenland	25	34	2007 World Men's Handball Championship
82	27/01/2007	Westfalenhalle	Dortmund, Germany	Brazil	23	30	2007 World Men's Handball Championship
83	28/01/2007	Westfalenhalle	Dortmund, Germany	Qatar	22	36	2007 World Men's Handball Championship
84	7/04/2008	TSB Arena	Wellington, New Zealand	New Caledonia	15	20	2008 Oceania Handball Championship
85	8/04/2008	TSB Arena	Wellington, New Zealand	Cook Islands	32	11	2008 Oceania Handball Championship
86	10/04/2008	TSB Arena	Wellington, New Zealand	New Zealand	38	17	2008 Oceania Handball Championship
87	07/11/2008		Noumea, New Caledonia	New Caledonia			Friendly
88	08/11/2008		Noumea, New Caledonia	New Caledonia			Friendly
89	09/11/2008		Noumea, New Caledonia	New Caledonia			Friendly
90	17/01/2009	Gradski Vrt	Osijek, Croatia	Hungary	17	41	2009 World Men's Handball Championship
91	18/01/2009	Gradski Vrt	Osijek, Croatia	Slovakia	12	47	2009 World Men's Handball Championship
92	19/01/2009	Gradski Vrt	Osijek, Croatia	France	11	42	2009 World Men's Handball Championship
93	21/01/2009	Gradski Vrt	Osijek, Croatia	Romania	20	40	2009 World Men's Handball Championship
94	22/01/2009	Gradski Vrt	Osijek, Croatia	Argentina	16	36	2009 World Men's Handball Championship
95	24/01/2009	Sport Centre Mate Parlov	Pula, Croatia	Spain	10	42	2009 World Men's Handball Championship
96	25/01/2009	Sport Centre Mate Parlov	Pula, Croatia	Cuba	17	27	2009 World Men's Handball Championship
97	26/01/2009	Sport Centre Mate Parlov	Pula, Croatia	Kuwait	24	27	2009 World Men's Handball Championship
98	27/01/2009	Sport Centre Mate Parlov	Pula, Croatia	Saudi Arabia	19	23	2009 World Men's Handball Championship
99	21/04/2010	Çanakkale Sports Centre	Çanakkale, Turkey	Turkey	17	37	Tri Nations Tournament
100	22/04/2010	Çanakkale Sports Centre	Çanakkale, Turkey	Turkey	21	39	Tri Nations Tournament

== Games 100 onwards ==
No.	Date	Venue	Place	Opponent	Goals for	Goals against	Competition
101	24/04/2010	Çanakkale Sports Centre	Çanakkale, Turkey	Turkey	18	30	Tri Nations Tournament
102	8/05/2010	Te Rauparana Arena	Porirua, New Zealand	Cook Islands	41	13	2010 Oceania Handball Championship
103	8/05/2010	Te Rauparana Arena	Porirua, New Zealand	New Zealand	30	17	2010 Oceania Handball Championship
104	9/05/2010	Te Rauparana Arena	Porirua, New Zealand	New Zealand	30	16	2010 Oceania Handball Championship
105	10/05/2010	Te Rauparana Arena	Porirua, New Zealand	Cook Islands	46	7	2010 Oceania Handball Championship
106	14/01/2011	Malmö Arena	Malmö, Sweden	Denmark	12	47	2011 World Men's Handball Championship
107	16/01/2011	Malmö Arena	Malmö, Sweden	Serbia	18	35	2011 World Men's Handball Championship
108	17/01/2011	Malmö Arena	Malmö, Sweden	Croatia	15	42	2011 World Men's Handball Championship
109	19/01/2011	Färs & Frosta Arena	Lund, Sweden	Romania	14	29	2011 World Men's Handball Championship
110	20/01/2011	Malmö Arena	Malmö, Sweden	Algeria	18	27	2011 World Men's Handball Championship
111	22/01/2011	Malmö Arena	Malmö, Sweden	Chile	21	29	2011 World Men's Handball Championship
112	23/01/2011	Malmö Arena	Malmö, Sweden	Bahrain	23	33	2011 World Men's Handball Championship
113	22/06/2012	Dural Sports Centre	Sydney, Australia	New Zealand	31	10	2012 Oceania Handball Championship
114	23/06/2012	Dural Sports Centre	Sydney, Australia	New Zealand	31	10	2012 Oceania Handball Championship
115	12/01/2013	Caja Magica	Madrid, Spain	Croatia	13	36	2013 World Men's Handball Championship
116	13/01/2013	Caja Magica	Madrid, Spain	Hungary	13	43	2013 World Men's Handball Championship
117	15/01/2013	Caja Magica	Madrid, Spain	Spain	11	51	2013 World Men's Handball Championship
118	17/01/2013	Caja Magica	Madrid, Spain	Algeria	15	39	2013 World Men's Handball Championship
119	19/01/2013	Caja Magica	Madrid, Spain	Egypt	14	39	2013 World Men's Handball Championship
120	21/01/2013	Palacio De Guadalajara	Guadalajara, Spain	South Korea	14	36	2013 World Men's Handball Championship
121	22/01/2013	Palacio De Guadalajara	Guadalajara, Spain	Chile	23	32	2013 World Men's Handball Championship
122	25/04/2014	ASB Stadium	Auckland, New Zealand	New Zealand	22	18	2014 Oceania Handball Championship
123	26/04/2014	ASB Stadium	Auckland, New Zealand	New Zealand	32	18	2014 Oceania Handball Championship
124	20/06/2015	Pallati i Rinisë, Pristina	Pristina, Kosovo	Faroe Islands	34	34	2015 IHF Emerging Nations Championship
125	21/06/2015	Pallati i Rinisë, Pristina	Pristina, Kosovo	Kosovo	24	31	2015 IHF Emerging Nations Championship
126	22/06/2015	Pallati i Rinisë, Pristina	Pristina, Kosovo	Armenia	61	20	2015 IHF Emerging Nations Championship
127	23/06/2015	Pallati i Rinisë, Pristina	Pristina, Kosovo	Albania	30	22	2015 IHF Emerging Nations Championship
128	24/06/2015	Pallati i Rinisë, Pristina	Pristina, Kosovo	Great Britain	26	32	2015 IHF Emerging Nations Championship
129	24/06/2015	Pallati i Rinisë, Pristina	Pristina, Kosovo	Bulgaria	35	36	2015 IHF Emerging Nations Championship
130	15/11/2015	Duhail Handball Sports Hall	Doha, Qatar	China	24	29	2016 Rio Olympic Qualifiers
131	17/11/2015	Duhail Handball Sports Hall	Doha, Qatar	Iraq	19	32	2016 Rio Olympic Qualifiers
132	19/11/2015	Duhail Handball Sports Hall	Doha, Qatar	South Korea	16	35	2016 Rio Olympic Qualifiers
133	21/11/2015	Duhail Handball Sports Hall	Doha, Qatar	Bahrain	11	33	2016 Rio Olympic Qualifiers
134	25/11/2015	Duhail Handball Sports Hall	Doha, Qatar	Uzbekistan	30	25	2016 Rio Olympic Qualifiers
135	26/11/2015	Duhail Handball Sports Hall	Doha, Qatar	Oman	24	30	2016 Rio Olympic Qualifiers
136	18/01/2018	Suwon Gymnasium	Suwon, South Korea	Bahrain	10	33	2018 Asian Men's Handball Championship
137	19/01/2018	Seo-Suwon Chilbo Gymnasium	Suwon, South Korea	Oman	19	33	2018 Asian Men's Handball Championship
138	22/01/2018	Seo-Suwon Chilbo Gymnasium	Suwon, South Korea	Bangladesh	35	22	2018 Asian Men's Handball Championship
139	23/01/2018	Seo-Suwon Chilbo Gymnasium	Suwon, South Korea	China	16	26	2018 Asian Men's Handball Championship
140	26/01/2018	Seo-Suwon Chilbo Gymnasium	Suwon, South Korea	India	27	24	2018 Asian Men's Handball Championship
141	13/01/2020		Kuwait City, Kuwait	United Arab Emirates	17	33	Friendly
142	16/01/2020	Shaikh Saad Al-Abdullah Sports Hall Complex	Kuwait City, Kuwait	South Korea	20	40	2020 Asian Men's Handball Championship
143	17/01/2020	Shaikh Saad Al-Abdullah Sports Hall Complex	Kuwait City, Kuwait	Saudi Arabia	15	37	2020 Asian Men's Handball Championship
144	21/01/2020	Shaikh Saad Al-Abdullah Sports Hall Complex	Kuwait City, Kuwait	Iraq	26	31	2020 Asian Men's Handball Championship
145	23/01/2020	Shaikh Saad Al-Abdullah Sports Hall Complex	Kuwait City, Kuwait	China	25	28	2020 Asian Men's Handball Championship
146	25/01/2020	Shaikh Saad Al-Abdullah Sports Hall Complex	Kuwait City, Kuwait	New Zealand	37	24	2020 Asian Men's Handball Championship; 2020 Oceania Men's Handball Championship
147	26/01/2020	Shaikh Saad Al-Abdullah Sports Hall Complex	Kuwait City, Kuwait	Hong Kong	17	23	2020 Asian Men's Handball Championship
148	13/01/2021		Maleha, UAE	United Arab Emirates	20	34	Friendly
149	15/01/2021		Maleha, UAE	United Arab Emirates	17	29	Friendly

== Games 150 onwards ==
No.	Date	Venue	Place	Opponent	Goals for	Goals against	Competition
150	18/01/2021	Prince Nayef Sports Hall	Al-Qatif, Saudi Arabia	Iran	10	32	2022 Asian Men's Handball Championship
151	19/01/2021	Dammam Sports Hall	Dammam, Saudi Arabia	Saudi Arabia	13	30	2022 Asian Men's Handball Championship
152	20/01/2021	Dammam Sports Hall	Dammam, Saudi Arabia	India	27	26	2022 Asian Men's Handball Championship
-	22/01/2021	Prince Nayef Sports City Hall	Al-Qatif, Saudi Arabia	Oman	Forfeit due to COVID-19		2022 Asian Men's Handball Championship
-	23/01/2021	Ministry of Sports Hall	Dammam, Saudi Arabia	Hong Kong	Forfeit due to COVID-19		2022 Asian Men's Handball Championship
-	23/01/2021	Ministry of Sports Hall	Dammam, Saudi Arabia	Singapore	Forfeit due to COVID-19		2022 Asian Men's Handball Championship
153	28/01/2021	Prince Nayef Sports Hall	Al-Qatif, Saudi Arabia	India	21	25	2022 Asian Men's Handball Championship
154	26 April 2023	Palace of Culture and Sports	Varna, Bulgaria	Moldova	22	25	2023 IHF Emerging Nations Championship
155	27 April 2023	Palace of Culture and Sports	Varna, Bulgaria	Cyprus	24	21	2023 IHF Emerging Nations Championship
156	29 April 2023	Palace of Culture and Sports	Varna, Bulgaria	Andorra	32	19	2023 IHF Emerging Nations Championship
157	30 April 2023	Palace of Culture and Sports	Varna, Bulgaria	Great Britain	22	34	2023 IHF Emerging Nations Championship
158	15 January 2026		Kuwait	Japan	23	45	2026 Asian Men's Handball Championship
