= 2018 Pacific Handball Cup =

The 2018 Pacific Handball Cup is a multi venue Handball tournament featuring countries based on the Pacific Ocean from April to December 2018. This will be the first tournament since 2006 and the first to feature countries from the American continent.

The first leg was carried out in Mexico during April. The other legs will be completed by October with the finals to be held on Hawaii in December.

The championships were abandoned, as the Oceania teams concentrated on the 2018 Oceania Men's Handball Challenge Trophy and both the Australian Women's and New Zealand women's team's playing in the 2018 Asian Women's Handball Championship. The Vanuatu Handball Association was also recovering from the October 2015 earthquake.

== Fixtures ==
=== Pool A - America's ===
Team	Pld	W	D	L	GF	GA	GD	Pts
Canada	2	1	1	0	59	57	+2	3
Mexico	2	0	2	0	56	56	0	2
United States	2	0	1	1	61	59	+2	1

All times are local (UTC−05:00).

4 April 2018; 18:00	Canada	26–26	Mexico	Centro deportivo Olimpico Mexicano, Mexico City

5 April 2018; 18:00	Mexico	30–30	United States	Centro deportivo Olimpico Mexicano, Mexico City

8 April 2018; 12:00	United States	31–33	Canada	Centro deportivo Olimpico Mexicano, Mexico City

=== Pool B - Oceania ===
Team	Pld	W	D	L	GF	GA	GD	Pts
Australia	0	0	0	0	0	0	0	0
Cook Islands	0	0	0	0	0	0	0	0
New Zealand	0	0	0	0	0	0	0	0

TBA	Cook Islands	v	New Zealand	Cook Islands

TBA	Australia	v	Cook Islands	Cook Islands

TBA	New Zealand	v	Australia	Cook Islands

=== Pool C - French Pacific ===
Team	Pld	W	D	L	GF	GA	GD	Pts
French Polynesia	0	0	0	0	0	0	0	0
New Caledonia	0	0	0	0	0	0	0	0
Vanuatu	0	0	0	0	0	0	0	0

TBA	Vanuatu	v	New Caledonia	Vanuatu

TBA	French Polynesia	v	Vanuatu	Vanuatu

TBA	New Caledonia	v	French Polynesia	Vanuatu

== Playoffs ==
=== Finals ===
Team	Pld	W	D	L	GF	GA	GD	Pts
Canada	0	0	0	0	0	0	0	0
B1	0	0	0	0	0	0	0	0
C1	0	0	0	0	0	0	0	0

TBA	Canada	v	B1	Hawaii

TBA	C1	v	Canada	Hawaii

TBA	B1	v	C1	Hawaii

=== 4th - 6th playoff ===
Team	Pld	W	D	L	GF	GA	GD	Pts
Mexico	0	0	0	0	0	0	0	0
B2	0	0	0	0	0	0	0	0
C2	0	0	0	0	0	0	0	0

TBA	Mexico	v	B2	Hawaii

TBA	C2	v	Mexico	Hawaii

TBA	B2	v	C2	Hawaii

=== 7th - 9th playoff ===
Team	Pld	W	D	L	GF	GA	GD	Pts
United States	0	0	0	0	0	0	0	0
B3	0	0	0	0	0	0	0	0
C3	0	0	0	0	0	0	0	0

TBA	United States	v	B3	Hawaii

TBA	C3	v	United States	Hawaii

TBA	B3	v	C3	Hawaii

== See also ==
- Pacific Handball Cup
- Oceania Continent Handball Federation
- Pan-American Team Handball Federation
