= Hannah Mouncey =

Australian handball player

Personal information
- Born: 21 October 1989 (age 37) Sydney
- Height: 188 cm (6 ft 2 in)

Sport
- Sport: Handball
- Position: Pivot
- Current club: Canberra Handball Club
- Number: 23

Senior clubs
- Years: Team
- 2009–2019, 2021–present: Canberra Handball Club
- 2018–2019: Melbourne Handball Club
National team
| Years | Team | Apps | |
| 2012–2015 | Australia men's team | 22 | |
| 2018–present | Australia women's team | 11 | (51) |
- Updated on 11 February 2023

Hannah Mouncey (born 21 October 1989) is an Australian national squad handball player who also plays Australian rules football. Mouncey represented Australia in men's handball before transitioning. She has been the subject of controversy over her eligibility to participate in women's competitions. Mouncey debuted with the Australia women's national handball team at the 2018 Asian Women's Handball Championship and competed again at the 2022 Asian Women’s Championships held in Incheon and Seoul, South Korea.

== Men's handball ==
Mouncey commenced her handball career after moving to Canberra in 2009, playing handball for the Canberra Handball Club in the Australian Capital Territory. She is a past president of Handball ACT.

Mouncey played 22 games with the Australian men's national handball team, debuting in the 2012 Oceania Handball Championship against New Zealand. Mouncey continued to represent Australia at the 2013 World Men's Handball Championship, where she top scored for Australia with four goals against the eventual 2013 World Champions, Spain, and despite her youth and relative inexperience was an integral of the Australian side, starting most games and playing a central role in defence.

Mouncey was known for playing through injury during her time with the Australian men’s team. She competed at the World Championships with a broken wrist suffered before the tournament, a torn meniscus and posterior cruciate ligament at the Emerging Nations tournament in Kosovo, and fractured an eye socket in Australia’s second match at the 2015 Olympic Qualifying Tournament against Iraq. Mouncey never missed a game due to injury.

== Transition ==
Mouncey decided to transition while in Qatar to compete in a 2016 Summer Olympics qualifying tournament, and began hormone therapy in November 2015. She provided news of her decision to her mother while still in Qatar, prior to informing other friends and family, and publicly identified as female in May 2016.

== Women's handball ==
International Olympic Committee's guidelines are for 12 months of hormone therapy before a trans woman can compete in women's competition, but Mouncey's testosterone levels were well below the required levels of 10 nmol/L by July 2016. Mouncey hoped to play in women's competition in October 2016, and to be selected in Australia women's national handball team. Her request to play for the ACT representative team in October 2016 was refused by the Australian Handball Federation, citing insurance concerns because she was still three weeks short of the IOC guideline of 12 months of hormone therapy.

On 27 May 2018, Mouncey scored three goals for Melbourne Handball Club in their win over University of Queensland Handball Club for the 2018 Oceanian Open Club Championship.

In April 2018, Mouncey began training with the Australia women's national handball team in anticipation of the International Handball Federation clearing her to play in the 2018 Asian Women's Handball Championship in Kumamoto, Japan. Mouncey scored four goals in her first international game with the Australia women's team, a 24–32 loss to Kazakhstan on 30 November 2018. She played all six games and scored 23 goals as the Australians finished fifth, qualifying for the 2019 World Women's Handball Championship. Mouncey was not selected to play at World Championships. She stated that this was due to some of the team being uncomfortable sharing the showers and change room with her, but this was denied by Handball Australia.

For the Australian Open Club Championships in beach handball, Mouncey strengthened the women's national team of American Samoa, which competed in the tournament as a club team, and took second place with them.

== Australian football ==
Although the 2018 AFL Women's season did not start until well beyond the 12 month IOC guideline, Mouncey's nomination for the 2017 AFL Women's draft was declined based on the Victorian Equal Opportunity Act allowing gender discrimination "if strength, stamina or physique is relevant". Mouncey's testosterone levels had remained far below the IOC limit, and the Australian Football League (AFL) had indicated they would use IOC guidelines on transgender players. The AFL indicated that she could play for Ainslie in 2018, and could nominate for the 2018 AFL Women's draft. In response, the Ainslie Football Club coach and president both stated to the media that there had been no concerns about Mouncey's strength, stamina and physique in the 2017 AFL Canberra women's competition.

The late decision to exclude Mouncey left the AFL open to criticism from the public and the media, and the AFL Players Association called for clarification from the AFL on the eligibility of transgender players. There was confusion about whether the AFL had authority to approve Mouncey to play in other Australian football leagues in 2018, or whether their approval was necessary, contrasting with both the earlier indication that this would be acceptable and Mouncey's participation in 2017. In December 2017, Mouncey decided to move to Melbourne to advance her football career. At the time, Mouncey had been homeless for almost a year due to mental health issues, and saw football as her most probably avenue for stable accommodation and employment. Fairfax Media listed the denial of Mouncey's nomination as one of year's top 10 sports stories in Canberra.

Mouncey has stated that she knew ahead of the draft that she was going to be selected by either Collingwood or the Western Bulldogs had she been allowed to nominate. Mouncey said she believed the Western Bulldogs would have taken her earlier in the draft than Collingwood. Mouncey had also trialled with the Melbourne Demons, however they were to pass on Mouncey in the draft as they deemed her too slow and lacking in endurance for their game style. AFL Victoria later confirmed, after she began training with Darebin Falcons, that Mouncey would play in the 2018 VFL Women's season. This was the first time that the AFL had agreed for an openly transgender woman to play at that level.

Mouncey debuted for Darebin in round 1 of the 2018 VFLW season, kicking a goal while playing in the ruck and at full-forward in a lop-sided loss against the Northern Territory Football Club.

Mouncey ended the season second in VFLW goal-kicking behind Darcy Vescio. After playing primarily at full forward for the early part of the season, Mouncey moved to centre half forward for the majority of the VFLW season because of her mobility in that position. Mouncey was controversially left out of the VFLW team of the year despite leading the competition's goal-kicking from the second round to the final round of the season, and being in the Darebin Falcons best players seven times in fourteen games. On 9 September 2018, Mouncey announced that she would not nominate for the 2018 AFL Women's draft, while publicly releasing health and fitness records as evidence that she was eligible under the AFL's policies for nomination of trans women.
