= Kristofer Karlsson =

Australian handball player (born 1992)

Personal information
- Born: 26 October 1992 (age 33) Bondi, New South Wales, Australia
- Height: 1.89 m (6 ft 2 1/2 in)

Sport
- Sport: Handball
- Position: Goalkeeper
- Current club: HIFK
- Number: 12

Senior clubs
- Years: Team
- 1998–2004: Westermalm IF
- 2005–2008: HK Cliff
- 2009, 2012–2013: AIK Handboll
- 2010–2011: IF Swithiod
- 2014–2015: KÍF - Kollafjarðar Ítróttarfelag
- 2016–2018: Kungsängens SK
National team
Years	Team	Apps
2011–2013	Australia U21	8
2010	Southern Stars	4
2010–current	Australia	28

Kristofer Karlsson (born 26 October 1992) is an Australian team handball player.

He grew up in Stockholm, Sweden, the child of a Swedish father and an Australian mother. Karlsson was born in Australia, but moved to Sweden when he was four. He is a dual citizen of Sweden and Australia.

== Career ==
Karlsson lives in Stockholm. He plays for Helsingfors IFK in the Finnish top league, after one year in Finnish HC HIK from Hanko, Finland.

In 2010, he joined the Australian team Australian national team (under the name of "The Southern Stars") and participated in the IHF Super Globe. In 2011 Karlsson participated in the Intercontinental Trophy Cup where he was awarded "Best Goalkeeper". In 2013 Karlsson was picked to play the 23rd World Championship in Spain, the youngest goalkeeper and second youngest player in the tournament.

He has since represented Australia at the 2014 Oceania Handball Championship, 2015 IHF Emerging Nations Championship, 2016 Rio Olympic Qualifiers and World Cup Qualifiers in Qatar and South Korea.
