= American Samoa men's national handball team =

American Samoa

Information
- Association: America Samoa Handball Association
- Coach: Carl Sagapolutele Floor

Colours
1st	2nd

Results

Summer Olympics
- Appearances: None

World Championship
- Appearances: None

Oceania Handball Nations Cup
- Appearances: None
- Last updated on Unknown.

The American Samoa national handball team is the national men's handball team of American Samoa. Controlled by the American Samoa Handball Association it represents American Samoa in international matches.

In 2019 the team came 4th in the Oceania Championships.

== Oceania Nations Cup record ==
=== Competitive record at the Oceania Nations Cup ===
Year	Round	Position
(New Zealand) 2014	Did not Enter	
