= 2007 French Pacific Women's Handball Cup =

The 2007 Women's French Pacific Handball Championship was held in Auckland, New Zealand from 25–26 May 2005, as part of the Women's Pacific Handball Cup.

The competition participants Tahiti, and New Caledonia. Wallis and Futuna did not send a team.

The winners were New Caledonia over Tahiti.

== Rankings ==
Classification
1st place, gold medalist(s)	New Caledonia
2nd place, silver medalist(s)	French Polynesia
DNS	Wallis and Futuna
