= Shahoo Nosrati =

Iranian handball player (born 1989)

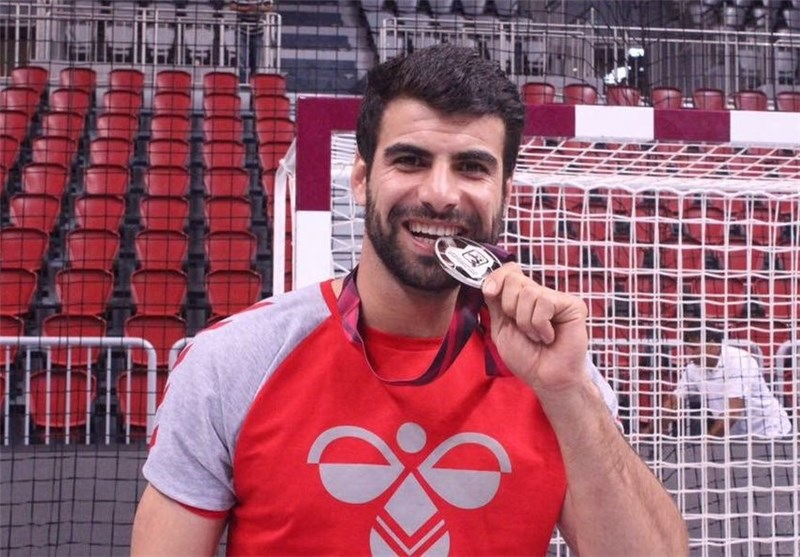
- Shahoo Nosrati in 2023

Personal information
- Nationality: Iranian
- Born: 16 January 1989 (age 37) Sanandaj, Iran
- Height: 1.87 m (6 ft 2 in)

Sport
- Sport: Handball
- Position: Right Back
- Current club: CSA Steaua București
- Number: 5

Senior clubs
- Years: Team
- 2006–2007: Azad University
- 2007–2009: Shardari Kerman
- 2009–2011: Mes Kerman (handball)
- 2011–2012: Nirozamini Tehran
- 2012–2014: Mes Kerman (handball)
- 2014–2015: Sang Ahan Bafgh
- 2015–2016: Ahli Sidab Club (handball)
- 2016–2017: CSA Steaua București
- 2017–2018: Lekhwiya
- 2017–2018: AHC Dunărea Călărași
- 2019–2023: HC Buzău
- 2023-2024: U Cluj
- 2024-2026: CSA Steaua București
National team
| Years | Team | Apps | (Gls) |
| – | Iran | 200 | (250) |
Medal record
Men's Handball
Representing Iran
Asian Men's Handball Championship
| Bronze medal – third place | Bahrain 2014 |
Islamic Solidarity Games
| Bronze medal – third place | Konya 2021 |
Summer Olympics Qualification
| Silver medal – second place | Doha 2016 |

Shahoo Nosrati is an Iranian professional handball player currently playing for CSA Steaua București in Romania. In December 2019, the Islamic Republic of Iran's Handball Federation announced that, according to the Public Relations department of the federation, he wished to opt out of being in the national team, through a post on his personal page. He later came back where he participated in the 2021 Islamic Solidarity Games, where Iran won the bronze medal. Furthermore, he was featured in Iran's handball national team provisional roster of the 2023 IHF World Men's Handball Championship. In 2025, he promoted to the first division of Romanian handball with CSA Steaua București (handbal).

== Collective achievements ==
| Season / year | Competition | Club / national team | Result | Ref(s) |
|---|---|---|---|---|
| 2014 | Handball at the 2014 Asian Games | Iran | 4th | |
| 2015 | 2015 World Men's Handball Championship | Iran | 21st | |
| 2016 | 2016 Asian Men's Handball Championship | Iran | 5th | |
| 2017-18 | Qatar Handball League | Lekhwiya | 1st | |
| 2018 | Handball at the 2018 Asian Games | Iran | 5th | |
| 2018 | 2018 Asian Men's Handball Championship | Iran | 5th | |
| 2020 | 2020 Asian Men's Handball Championship | Iran | 6th | |
| 2020 | Handball at the 2020 Summer Olympics – Men's qualification | Iran | 5th | |
