= Šestić =

Šestić is a surname. Notable people with the surname include:

- Dragi Šestić (born 1966), Bosnian music producer
- Dušan Šestić (born 1946), Bosnian Serb musician
- Marija Šestić (born 1987), Bosnian Serb singer
- Miloš Šestić (born 1956), Serbian footballer
- Sasa Sestic (born 1978), Bosnian-Australian barista
