= Pacific Handball Cup =

Sports competition

The Pacific Handball Cup is the official competition for senior national handball teams of Oceania, where dependent territories of other countries such as New Caledonia, Tahiti and Wallis and Futuna (France); American Samoa and Guam (United States); and the Marshall Islands, who are ineligible for International Handball Federation (IHF) world championship events, compete against Oceania nations. This is organised by the Oceania Continent Handball Federation (OCHF).

== Men's tournament ==
Year	Final			Third Place Match
Year	Champions	Score	Runners-up	Third Place	Score	Fourth Place
2004	Australia	28 - 19	New Caledonia	French Polynesia	34 - 29	New Zealand
2006	Australia	Round robin	New Caledonia	New Zealand	Round robin	Cook Islands
2018	cancelled			cancelled

== Women's tournament ==
Year	Final			Third Place Match
Year	Champions	Score	Runners-up	Third Place	Score	Fourth Place
2003	Unknown	Unknown	Unknown	Unknown	Unknown	Unknown
2005	Australia	Round robin	New Caledonia	French Polynesia	Round robin	New Zealand
2007	New Caledonia	Round robin	New Zealand	French Polynesia	Round robin	Vanuatu

== See also ==
- French Pacific Handball Championship
