= 2005 French Pacific Women's Handball Cup =

The 2005 Women's French Pacific Handball Championship was held in Sydney, Australia between May 25 and 27, 2005, as part of the Women's Pacific Handball Cup.

The competition participants Tahiti, and New Caledonia. Wallis and Futuna did not send a team.

The winners were New Caledonia over Tahiti.

== Results ==
| Team 1 | Agg. | Team 2 | 1st leg | 2nd leg |
|---|---|---|---|---|
| New Caledonia | 38–34 | French Polynesia | 21–15 | 17–19 |

== Rankings ==
Classification
| 1st place, gold medalist(s) | New Caledonia |
| 2nd place, silver medalist(s) | French Polynesia |
| DNS | Wallis and Futuna |
