= French Pacific Handball Championship =

Sporting competition

The French Pacific Handball Cup is the official competition for the senior national handball teams of the overseas departments and territories of France based in the Oceania region, namely New Caledonia, Tahiti and Wallis and Futuna. This competition is organised by the Oceania Continent Handball Federation (OCHF).

== Women's tournament ==
Year	Final
Year	Champions	Score	Runners-up
2005	New Caledonia	38 - 34; Two legs	French Polynesia
2007	New Caledonia	Unknown	French Polynesia

== Junior Men's tournament ==
Year	Final
Year	Champions	Score	Runners-up
2017	French Polynesia	34 - 19	New Caledonia
2018	French Polynesia	38 - 32	New Caledonia

== Junior Women's tournament ==
Year	Final
Year	Champions	Score	Runners-up
2023	New Caledonia	23 - 22	French Polynesia

== Youth Men's tournament ==
Year	Final
Year	Champions	Score	Runners-up
2022	French Polynesia	38 - 29	New Caledonia

== Women's Youth tournament ==
Year	Final
Year	Champions	Score	Runners-up
2019	New Caledonia	34 - 19	French Polynesia
2023	New Caledonia	44 - 10	French Polynesia
2023	New Caledonia	33 - 15	French Polynesia
