= Handball at the 2016 Summer Olympics – Men's qualification =

The qualification for the 2016 Men's Olympic Handball Tournament was held from January 2015 to April 2016. Twelve teams qualified, the hosts, the world champion, four continental event winners and six teams from the World Olympic qualification tournaments respectively.

== Qualification summary ==
Mean of qualification	Date	Host	Vacancies	Qualified
Host nation	2 October 2009	(Denmark) Copenhagen	1	Brazil
2015 World Championship	15 January – 1 February 2015	Qatar	1	France
2015 Pan American Games	16–25 July 2015	(Canada) Toronto	1	Argentina
2015 Asian Qualification Tournament	14–27 November 2015	(Qatar) Doha	1	Qatar
2016 European Championship	15–31 January 2016	Poland	1	Germany
2016 African Championship	21–30 January 2016	(Egypt) Cairo	1	Egypt
2016 Olympic Qualification Tournaments	8–10 April 2016	(Poland) Gdańsk	2	Poland
2016 Olympic Qualification Tournaments	8–10 April 2016	(Poland) Gdańsk	2	Tunisia
2016 Olympic Qualification Tournaments	8–10 April 2016	(Sweden) Malmö	2	Slovenia
2016 Olympic Qualification Tournaments	8–10 April 2016	(Sweden) Malmö	2	Sweden
2016 Olympic Qualification Tournaments	8–10 April 2016	(Denmark) Herning	2	Denmark
2016 Olympic Qualification Tournaments	8–10 April 2016	(Denmark) Herning	2	Croatia
Total			12	

== Legend for qualification type ==
Legend for qualification type
Team qualified from the World Championship directly to the 2016 Olympic Tournament
Team qualified from Continental Events directly to the 2016 Olympic Tournament
Team qualified from the World Championship to the Olympic Qualification Tournaments
Team qualified from Continental Events to the Olympic Qualification Tournaments

== Host country ==
- Brazil

== World Championship ==
Rank	Team
1st place, gold medalist(s)	France
2nd place, silver medalist(s)	Qatar
3rd place, bronze medalist(s)	Poland
4	Spain
5	Denmark
6	Croatia
7	Germany
8	Slovenia
9	North Macedonia
10	Sweden
11	Iceland
12	Argentina
13	Austria
14	Egypt
15	Tunisia
16	Brazil
17	Czech Republic
18	Belarus
19	Russia
20	Bosnia and Herzegovina
21	Iran
22	Saudi Arabia
23	Chile
24	Algeria

== Continental qualification ==
=== Europe (1st ranking continent) ===
Rank	Team
1st place, gold medalist(s)	Germany
2nd place, silver medalist(s)	Spain
3rd place, bronze medalist(s)	Croatia
4	Norway
5	France
6	Denmark
7	Poland
8	Sweden
9	Russia
10	Belarus
11	North Macedonia
12	Hungary
13	Iceland
14	Slovenia
15	Serbia
16	Montenegro

=== Asia (2nd ranking continent) ===
The tournament was held from 14 to 27 November 2015 in Doha, Qatar. It included Oceania champion's Australia.

All times are local (UTC+3).

==== Preliminary round ====
===== Group A =====
Pos	Team	Pld	W	D	L	GF	GA	GD	Pts	Qualification
1	Bahrain	4	4	0	0	142	81	+61	8	Advance to semifinals
2	South Korea	4	3	0	1	124	90	+34	6	Advance to semifinals
3	Iraq	4	2	0	2	103	105	−2	4	
4	China	4	1	0	3	101	135	−34	2	
5	Australia	4	0	0	4	70	129	−59	0	

Source: Asianhandball
Rules for classification: 1) points; 2) head-to-head points; 3) head-to-head goal difference; 4) head-to-head number of goals scored; 5) goal difference.

15 November 2015; 17:00	Iraq	20–26	South Korea	Duhail Handball Sports Hall, Doha
15 November 2015; 17:00		(8–11)		Duhail Handball Sports Hall, Doha

15 November 2015; 19:00	China	29–24	Australia	Duhail Handball Sports Hall, Doha
15 November 2015; 19:00		(17–8)		Duhail Handball Sports Hall, Doha

17 November 2015; 17:00	China	24–43	Bahrain	Duhail Handball Sports Hall, Doha
17 November 2015; 17:00		(11–20)		Duhail Handball Sports Hall, Doha

17 November 2015; 19:00	Iraq	32–19	Australia	Duhail Handball Sports Hall, Doha
17 November 2015; 19:00		(17–7)		Duhail Handball Sports Hall, Doha

19 November 2015; 17:00	Bahrain	35–16	Iraq	Duhail Handball Sports Hall, Doha
19 November 2015; 17:00		(18–5)		Duhail Handball Sports Hall, Doha

19 November 2015; 19:00	Australia	16–35	South Korea	Duhail Handball Sports Hall, Doha
19 November 2015; 19:00		(7–18)		Duhail Handball Sports Hall, Doha

21 November 2015; 17:00	South Korea	33–23	China	Duhail Handball Sports Hall, Doha
21 November 2015; 17:00		(17–8)		Duhail Handball Sports Hall, Doha

21 November 2015; 19:00	Bahrain	33–11	Australia	Duhail Handball Sports Hall, Doha
21 November 2015; 19:00		(21–3)		Duhail Handball Sports Hall, Doha

23 November 2015; 17:00	Iraq	35–25	China	Duhail Handball Sports Hall, Doha
23 November 2015; 17:00		(17–13)		Duhail Handball Sports Hall, Doha

23 November 2015; 19:00	Bahrain	31–30	South Korea	Duhail Handball Sports Hall, Doha
23 November 2015; 19:00		(12–19)		Duhail Handball Sports Hall, Doha

===== Group B =====
Pos	Team	Pld	W	D	L	GF	GA	GD	Pts	Qualification
1	Qatar	5	5	0	0	177	88	+89	10	Advance to semifinals
2	Iran	5	4	0	1	150	132	+18	8	Advance to semifinals
3	Japan	5	3	0	2	150	128	+22	6	
4	Saudi Arabia	5	2	0	3	126	135	−9	4	
5	Oman	5	1	0	4	140	167	−27	2	
6	Uzbekistan	5	0	0	5	101	194	−93	0	

Source: Asianhandball
Rules for classification: 1) points; 2) head-to-head points; 3) head-to-head goal difference; 4) head-to-head number of goals scored; 5) goal difference.

14 November 2015; 15:00	Japan	27–19	Saudi Arabia	Duhail Handball Sports Hall, Doha
14 November 2015; 15:00		(16–13)		Duhail Handball Sports Hall, Doha

14 November 2015; 17:00	Oman	31–39	Iran	Duhail Handball Sports Hall, Doha
14 November 2015; 17:00		(14–18)		Duhail Handball Sports Hall, Doha

14 November 2015; 19:00	Uzbekistan	9–49	Qatar	Duhail Handball Sports Hall, Doha
14 November 2015; 19:00		(4–24)		Duhail Handball Sports Hall, Doha

16 November 2015; 15:00	Saudi Arabia	29–23	Oman	Duhail Handball Sports Hall, Doha
16 November 2015; 15:00		(17–12)		Duhail Handball Sports Hall, Doha

16 November 2015; 17:00	Uzbekistan	18–33	Iran	Duhail Handball Sports Hall, Doha
16 November 2015; 17:00		(8–17)		Duhail Handball Sports Hall, Doha

16 November 2015; 19:00	Japan	19–36	Qatar	Duhail Handball Sports Hall, Doha
16 November 2015; 19:00		(9–16)		Duhail Handball Sports Hall, Doha

18 November 2015; 15:00	Iran	31–27	Japan	Duhail Handball Sports Hall, Doha
18 November 2015; 15:00		(14–15)		Duhail Handball Sports Hall, Doha

18 November 2015; 17:00	Qatar	29–23	Saudi Arabia	Duhail Handball Sports Hall, Doha
18 November 2015; 17:00		(16–15)		Duhail Handball Sports Hall, Doha

18 November 2015; 19:00	Oman	39–33	Uzbekistan	Duhail Handball Sports Hall, Doha
18 November 2015; 19:00		(22–14)		Duhail Handball Sports Hall, Doha

20 November 2015; 15:00	Oman	27–35	Japan	Duhail Handball Sports Hall, Doha
20 November 2015; 15:00		(15–18)		Duhail Handball Sports Hall, Doha

20 November 2015; 17:00	Saudi Arabia	31–26	Uzbekistan	Duhail Handball Sports Hall, Doha
20 November 2015; 17:00		(19–13)		Duhail Handball Sports Hall, Doha

20 November 2015; 19:00	Iran	17–32	Qatar	Duhail Handball Sports Hall, Doha
20 November 2015; 19:00		(8–16)		Duhail Handball Sports Hall, Doha

22 November 2015; 15:00	Qatar	31–20	Oman	Duhail Handball Sports Hall, Doha
22 November 2015; 15:00		(14–8)		Duhail Handball Sports Hall, Doha

22 November 2015; 17:00	Japan	42–15	Uzbekistan	Duhail Handball Sports Hall, Doha
22 November 2015; 17:00		(19–9)		Duhail Handball Sports Hall, Doha

22 November 2015; 19:00	Iran	30–24	Saudi Arabia	Duhail Handball Sports Hall, Doha
22 November 2015; 19:00		(14–11)		Duhail Handball Sports Hall, Doha

==== Knockout stage ====
Semi-finals
25 November
Bahrain	30
Iran	35
25 November
Qatar	30
South Korea	26

Final
27 November
Iran	19
Qatar	28
Third place
27 November
Bahrain	34
South Korea	21

5th place bracket

Semi-finals
25 November
Iraq	31
Saudi Arabia	33
25 November
Japan	40
China	24

Fifth Place
26 November
Saudi Arabia	27
Japan	38
Seventh Place
26 November
Iraq	38
China	27

===== 9–11th place semifinal =====
25 November 2015; 10:00	Australia	30–25	Uzbekistan	Duhail Handball Sports Hall, Doha
25 November 2015; 10:00		(17–14)		Duhail Handball Sports Hall, Doha

===== 5–8th place semifinals =====
25 November 2015; 12:00	Iraq	31–33	Saudi Arabia	Duhail Handball Sports Hall, Doha
25 November 2015; 12:00		(17–19)		Duhail Handball Sports Hall, Doha

25 November 2015; 14:00	Japan	40–24	China	Duhail Handball Sports Hall, Doha
25 November 2015; 14:00		(17–10)		Duhail Handball Sports Hall, Doha

===== Semifinals =====
25 November 2015; 16:00	Bahrain	30–35	Iran	Duhail Handball Sports Hall, Doha
25 November 2015; 16:00		(12–16)		Duhail Handball Sports Hall, Doha

25 November 2015; 18:00	Qatar	30–26	South Korea	Duhail Handball Sports Hall, Doha
25 November 2015; 18:00		(14–9)		Duhail Handball Sports Hall, Doha

===== Ninth place game =====
26 November 2015; 14:00	Australia	24–30	Oman	Duhail Handball Sports Hall, Doha
26 November 2015; 14:00		(11–11)		Duhail Handball Sports Hall, Doha

===== Seventh place game =====
26 November 2015; 16:00	Iraq	38–27	China	Duhail Handball Sports Hall, Doha
26 November 2015; 16:00		(15–11)		Duhail Handball Sports Hall, Doha

===== Fifth place game =====
26 November 2015; 18:00	Saudi Arabia	27–38	Japan	Duhail Handball Sports Hall, Doha
26 November 2015; 18:00		(17–14)		Duhail Handball Sports Hall, Doha

===== Third place game =====
27 November 2015; 16:00	Bahrain	34–21	South Korea	Duhail Handball Sports Hall, Doha
27 November 2015; 16:00		(17–10)		Duhail Handball Sports Hall, Doha

===== Final =====
27 November 2015; 18:00	Iran	19–28	Qatar	Duhail Handball Sports Hall, Doha
27 November 2015; 18:00		(11–15)		Duhail Handball Sports Hall, Doha

==== Final ranking ====
Rank	Team
1st place, gold medalist(s)	Qatar
2nd place, silver medalist(s)	Iran
3rd place, bronze medalist(s)	Bahrain
4	South Korea
5	Japan
6	Saudi Arabia
7	Iraq
8	China
9	Oman
10	Australia
11	Uzbekistan

=== America (3rd ranking continent) ===
Rank	Team
1st place, gold medalist(s)	Brazil
2nd place, silver medalist(s)	Argentina
3rd place, bronze medalist(s)	Chile
4	Uruguay
5	Puerto Rico
6	Cuba
7	Canada
8	Dominican Republic

=== Africa (4th ranking continent) ===
Rank	Team
1st place, gold medalist(s)	Egypt
2nd place, silver medalist(s)	Tunisia
3rd place, bronze medalist(s)	Angola
4	Algeria
5	Cameroon
6	Morocco
7	DR Congo
8	Congo
9	Libya
10	Nigeria
11	Gabon
12	Kenya

== Olympic Qualification Tournaments ==
The Olympic Qualification Tournaments were held on 8–10 April 2016. Only twelve teams that have not yet qualified through the five events mentioned above could play in the tournament:

- The top six teams from the World championship that did not already qualify through their continental championships were eligible to participate in the tournament.
- The best ranked teams of each continent in the World championship represented the continent in order to determine the continental ranking. The first ranked continent received two more places for the tournament. The second, third and fourth ranked continent received one place each. The last place belongs to a team from Oceania, if one was ranked between 8th–12th at the World Championship. As no team from Oceania met this condition, the second ranked continent received an extra place instead. The teams that already earned their places through their World championship ranking will not be considered for receiving places through the continental criterion.
- The twelve teams were allocated in three pools of four teams according to the table below. The top two teams from each pool qualified for the 2016 Olympic Games.

2016 Olympic Qualification Tournament #1	2016 Olympic Qualification Tournament #2	2016 Olympic Qualification Tournament #3
3rd from World: Poland; 9th from World: Macedonia; 3rd from Americas: Chile; 2nd from Africa: Tunisia	4th from World: Spain; 8th from World: Slovenia; 2nd from Asia: Iran; 8th from Europe: Sweden	5th from World: Denmark; 6th from World: Croatia; 4th from Europe: Norway; 3rd from Asia: Bahrain

=== 2016 Olympic Qualification Tournament #1 ===
Pos	Team	Pld	W	D	L	GF	GA	GD	Pts	Qualification
1	Poland (H)	3	3	0	0	88	71	+17	6	Qualification to 2016 Summer Olympics
2	Tunisia	3	2	0	1	91	83	+8	4	Qualification to 2016 Summer Olympics
3	Macedonia	3	1	0	2	76	84	−8	2	
4	Chile	3	0	0	3	83	100	−17	0	

Source: IHF
Rules for classification: 1) Points; 2) Head-to-head points; 3) Head-to-head goal difference; 4) Head-to-head goals scored; 5) Goal difference; 6) Goals scored; 7) Draw.
(H) Hosts

All times are local (UTC+2).

8 April 2016; 18:00	Chile	29–35	Tunisia	Ergo Arena, Gdańsk / Sopot; Attendance: 2,000; Referees: Kolahdouzan, Mousavian (IRN)
8 April 2016; 18:00	Salinas 11	(12–17)	Boughanmi 11	Ergo Arena, Gdańsk / Sopot; Attendance: 2,000; Referees: Kolahdouzan, Mousavian (IRN)
8 April 2016; 18:00	4× (yellow card) 6× (suspension) 1× (red card)	Report	2× (yellow card) 8× (suspension)	Ergo Arena, Gdańsk / Sopot; Attendance: 2,000; Referees: Kolahdouzan, Mousavian (IRN)

8 April 2016; 20:30	Poland	25–20	Macedonia	Ergo Arena, Gdańsk / Sopot; Attendance: 10,000; Referees: Pálsson, Eliasson (ISL)
8 April 2016; 20:30	Bielecki 7	(13–9)	Lazarov 8	Ergo Arena, Gdańsk / Sopot; Attendance: 10,000; Referees: Pálsson, Eliasson (ISL)
8 April 2016; 20:30	3× (yellow card) 4× (suspension)	Report	4× (yellow card) 5× (suspension)	Ergo Arena, Gdańsk / Sopot; Attendance: 10,000; Referees: Pálsson, Eliasson (ISL)

9 April 2016; 18:30	Macedonia	26–32	Tunisia	Ergo Arena, Gdańsk / Sopot; Attendance: 4,500; Referees: Hansen, Gjeding (DEN)
9 April 2016; 18:30	Lazarov 8	(10–17)	Boughanmi 7	Ergo Arena, Gdańsk / Sopot; Attendance: 4,500; Referees: Hansen, Gjeding (DEN)
9 April 2016; 18:30	3× (yellow card) 6× (suspension)	Report	2× (yellow card) 8× (suspension)	Ergo Arena, Gdańsk / Sopot; Attendance: 4,500; Referees: Hansen, Gjeding (DEN)

9 April 2016; 20:30	Poland	35–27	Chile	Ergo Arena, Gdańsk / Sopot; Attendance: 9,500; Referees: Pálsson, Eliasson (ISL)
9 April 2016; 20:30	Daszek, Szyba 5	(19–13)	Erw. Feuchtmann, Maurin 6	Ergo Arena, Gdańsk / Sopot; Attendance: 9,500; Referees: Pálsson, Eliasson (ISL)
9 April 2016; 20:30	3× (yellow card) 7× (suspension)	Report	3× (yellow card) 9× (suspension)	Ergo Arena, Gdańsk / Sopot; Attendance: 9,500; Referees: Pálsson, Eliasson (ISL)

10 April 2016; 18:00	Macedonia	30–27	Chile	Ergo Arena, Gdańsk / Sopot; Attendance: 2,500; Referees: Hansen, Gjeding (DEN)
10 April 2016; 18:00	Kosteski 6	(17–14)	Erw. Feuchtmann 10	Ergo Arena, Gdańsk / Sopot; Attendance: 2,500; Referees: Hansen, Gjeding (DEN)
10 April 2016; 18:00	3× (yellow card) 5× (suspension)	Report	3× (yellow card) 7× (suspension)	Ergo Arena, Gdańsk / Sopot; Attendance: 2,500; Referees: Hansen, Gjeding (DEN)

10 April 2016; 20:30	Tunisia	24–28	Poland	Ergo Arena, Gdańsk / Sopot; Attendance: 6,500; Referees: Kolahdouzan, Mousavian (IRN)
10 April 2016; 20:30	Bannour 5	(13–15)	Bielecki 7	Ergo Arena, Gdańsk / Sopot; Attendance: 6,500; Referees: Kolahdouzan, Mousavian (IRN)
10 April 2016; 20:30	4× (yellow card) 5× (suspension)	Report	3× (yellow card) 6× (suspension)	Ergo Arena, Gdańsk / Sopot; Attendance: 6,500; Referees: Kolahdouzan, Mousavian (IRN)

=== 2016 Olympic Qualification Tournament #2 ===
Pos	Team	Pld	W	D	L	GF	GA	GD	Pts	Qualification
1	Slovenia	3	2	0	1	80	62	+18	4 (Note: Slovenia 2 Pts, 47–45 GD; Sweden 2 Pts, 47–48 GD; Spain 2 Pts, 46–47 GD)	Qualification to 2016 Summer Olympics
2	Sweden (H)	3	2	0	1	81	67	+14	4	Qualification to 2016 Summer Olympics
3	Spain	3	2	0	1	83	70	+13	4	
4	Iran	3	0	0	3	59	104	−45	0	

Source: IHF
Rules for classification: 1) Points; 2) Head-to-head points; 3) Head-to-head goal difference; 4) Head-to-head goals scored; 5) Goal difference; 6) Goals scored; 7) Draw.
(H) Hosts
Notes:

Head-to-head table
Pos	Team	Pld	W	D	L	GF	GA	GD	Pts	Qualification
1	Slovenia	2	1	0	1	47	45	+2	2	Qualified
2	Sweden	2	1	0	1	47	48	−1	2	Qualified
3	Spain	2	1	0	1	46	47	−1	2	Missed

All times are local (UTC+2).

8 April 2016; 17:00	Spain	21–24	Slovenia	Malmö Arena, Malmö; Attendance: 2,264; Referees: Horáček, Novotný (CZE)
8 April 2016; 17:00	Rivera 6	(16–12)	Dolenec 6	Malmö Arena, Malmö; Attendance: 2,264; Referees: Horáček, Novotný (CZE)
8 April 2016; 17:00	3× (yellow card) 4× (suspension)	Report	3× (yellow card) 7× (suspension)	Malmö Arena, Malmö; Attendance: 2,264; Referees: Horáček, Novotný (CZE)

8 April 2016; 19:15	Iran	19–34	Sweden	Malmö Arena, Malmö; Attendance: 4,328; Referees: Nachevski, Nikolov (MKD)
8 April 2016; 19:15	Nosrati 4	(9–16)	three players 6	Malmö Arena, Malmö; Attendance: 4,328; Referees: Nachevski, Nikolov (MKD)
8 April 2016; 19:15	3× (yellow card) 3× (suspension)	Report	3× (yellow card) 1× (suspension)	Malmö Arena, Malmö; Attendance: 4,328; Referees: Nachevski, Nikolov (MKD)

9 April 2016; 16:15	Spain	37–23	Iran	Malmö Arena, Malmö; Attendance: 4,288; Referees: Menezes, Pinto (BRA)
9 April 2016; 16:15	Ugalde 9	(18–12)	Norouzinejad 6	Malmö Arena, Malmö; Attendance: 4,288; Referees: Menezes, Pinto (BRA)
9 April 2016; 16:15	4× (yellow card)	Report	3× (yellow card) 3× (suspension)	Malmö Arena, Malmö; Attendance: 4,288; Referees: Menezes, Pinto (BRA)

9 April 2016; 18:30	Slovenia	23–24	Sweden	Malmö Arena, Malmö; Attendance: 8,653; Referees: Horáček, Novotný (CZE)
9 April 2016; 18:30	Kavtičnik 8	(9–12)	Andersson, Gottfridsson 5	Malmö Arena, Malmö; Attendance: 8,653; Referees: Horáček, Novotný (CZE)
9 April 2016; 18:30	4× (yellow card) 5× (suspension)	Report	4× (yellow card) 5× (suspension)	Malmö Arena, Malmö; Attendance: 8,653; Referees: Horáček, Novotný (CZE)

10 April 2016; 16:30	Sweden	23–25	Spain	Malmö Arena, Malmö; Attendance: 8,253; Referees: Nachevski, Nikolov (MKD)
10 April 2016; 16:30	Nilsson 6	(11–12)	Rivera 9	Malmö Arena, Malmö; Attendance: 8,253; Referees: Nachevski, Nikolov (MKD)
10 April 2016; 16:30	3× (yellow card) 6× (suspension)	Report	4× (yellow card) 4× (suspension)	Malmö Arena, Malmö; Attendance: 8,253; Referees: Nachevski, Nikolov (MKD)

10 April 2016; 18:45	Slovenia	33–17	Iran	Malmö Arena, Malmö; Attendance: 655; Referees: Menezes, Pinto (BRA)
10 April 2016; 18:45	Marguč 8	(17–8)	Norouzinejad 4	Malmö Arena, Malmö; Attendance: 655; Referees: Menezes, Pinto (BRA)
10 April 2016; 18:45	3× (yellow card) 3× (suspension)	Report	2× (yellow card) 2× (suspension)	Malmö Arena, Malmö; Attendance: 655; Referees: Menezes, Pinto (BRA)

=== 2016 Olympic Qualification Tournament #3 ===
Pos	Team	Pld	W	D	L	GF	GA	GD	Pts	Qualification
1	Denmark (H)	3	2	1	0	79	73	+6	5	Qualification to 2016 Summer Olympics
2	Croatia	3	2	0	1	84	71	+13	4	Qualification to 2016 Summer Olympics
3	Norway	3	1	1	1	81	81	0	3	
4	Bahrain	3	0	0	3	75	94	−19	0	

Source: IHF
Rules for classification: 1) Points; 2) Head-to-head points; 3) Head-to-head goal difference; 4) Head-to-head goals scored; 5) Goal difference; 6) Goals scored; 7) Draw.
(H) Hosts

All times are local (UTC+2).

8 April 2016; 18:00	Norway	35–29	Bahrain	Jyske Bank Boxen, Herning; Attendance: 8,700; Referees: Rashed, El-Sayed (EGY)
8 April 2016; 18:00	Bjørnsen 10	(16–15)	M. Al-Maqabi 6	Jyske Bank Boxen, Herning; Attendance: 8,700; Referees: Rashed, El-Sayed (EGY)
8 April 2016; 18:00	3× (yellow card) 2× (suspension)	Report	3× (yellow card) 1× (suspension) 1× (red card)	Jyske Bank Boxen, Herning; Attendance: 8,700; Referees: Rashed, El-Sayed (EGY)

8 April 2016; 20:30	Denmark	28–24	Croatia	Jyske Bank Boxen, Herning; Attendance: 12,000; Referees: López, Ramírez (ESP)
8 April 2016; 20:30	Hansen 8	(11–9)	Štrlek 7	Jyske Bank Boxen, Herning; Attendance: 12,000; Referees: López, Ramírez (ESP)
8 April 2016; 20:30	3× (yellow card) 3× (suspension)	Report	4× (yellow card) 3× (suspension)	Jyske Bank Boxen, Herning; Attendance: 12,000; Referees: López, Ramírez (ESP)

9 April 2016; 18:00	Croatia	33–22	Bahrain	Jyske Bank Boxen, Herning; Attendance: 4,000; Referees: Rashed, El-Sayed (EGY)
9 April 2016; 18:00	Štrlek 8	(14–14)	Al-Fardan 5	Jyske Bank Boxen, Herning; Attendance: 4,000; Referees: Rashed, El-Sayed (EGY)
9 April 2016; 18:00	3× (yellow card) 6× (suspension)	Report	3× (yellow card) 2× (suspension)	Jyske Bank Boxen, Herning; Attendance: 4,000; Referees: Rashed, El-Sayed (EGY)

9 April 2016; 20:30	Denmark	25–25	Norway	Jyske Bank Boxen, Herning; Attendance: 12,000; Referees: Ștefan, Stark (ROU)
9 April 2016; 20:30	Hansen 5	(12–13)	three players 5	Jyske Bank Boxen, Herning; Attendance: 12,000; Referees: Ștefan, Stark (ROU)
9 April 2016; 20:30	3× (yellow card) 3× (suspension)	Report	4× (yellow card) 3× (suspension)	Jyske Bank Boxen, Herning; Attendance: 12,000; Referees: Ștefan, Stark (ROU)

10 April 2016; 18:00	Croatia	27–21	Norway	Jyske Bank Boxen, Herning; Attendance: 4,000; Referees: López, Ramírez (ESP)
10 April 2016; 18:00	Duvnjak 6	(14–7)	Jøndal 6	Jyske Bank Boxen, Herning; Attendance: 4,000; Referees: López, Ramírez (ESP)
10 April 2016; 18:00	2× (yellow card) 4× (suspension)	Report	3× (yellow card) 5× (suspension)	Jyske Bank Boxen, Herning; Attendance: 4,000; Referees: López, Ramírez (ESP)

10 April 2016; 20:30	Bahrain	24–26	Denmark	Jyske Bank Boxen, Herning; Attendance: 5,500; Referees: Ștefan, Stark (ROU)
10 April 2016; 20:30	Al-Salatna, Habib 4	(12–12)	Mortensen, Svan 5	Jyske Bank Boxen, Herning; Attendance: 5,500; Referees: Ștefan, Stark (ROU)
10 April 2016; 20:30	2× (yellow card) 6× (suspension)	Report	2× (yellow card) 3× (suspension)	Jyske Bank Boxen, Herning; Attendance: 5,500; Referees: Ștefan, Stark (ROU)
