= 2018 French Pacific Junior Men's Handball Cup =

The 2018 Junior Men's French Pacific Handball Championship was held in L'Arene du Sud, New Caledonia, New Caledonia on 14 June 2018 during the 2018 Oceania Men's Handball Challenge Trophy.

The competition participants Tahiti, and New Caledonia. Wallis and Futuna did not send a team.

The winners were Tahiti over New Caledonia.

== Results ==
14 June 2018; 20:00	French Polynesia	38 - 32	New Caledonia	L'Arene du Sud, New Caledonia

== Rankings ==
Classification
1st place, gold medalist(s)	French Polynesia
2nd place, silver medalist(s)	New Caledonia
DNS	Wallis and Futuna
