= Taip Ramadani =

Australian handball player

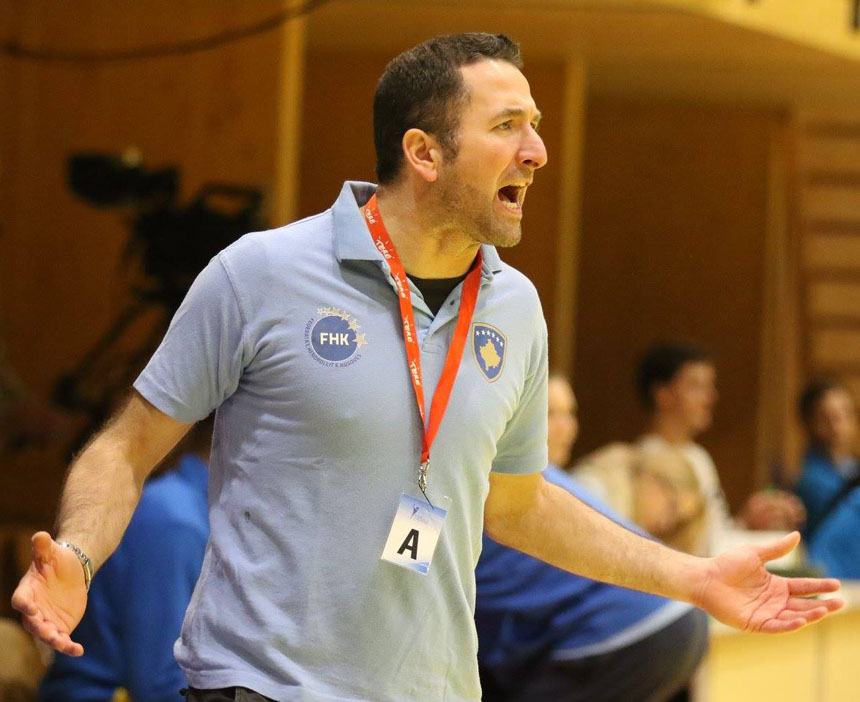
- Taip Ramadani

Personal information
- Nationality: Australian
- Born: 1 January 1972 (age 54) Sydney, Australia
- Height: 1.85 m (6 ft 1 in)

Sport
- Sport: Handball
- Position: Pivot
- Current club: Australia

Senior clubs
- Years: Team
- 1987–1992: UNSW HC
- 1992–1995: Bankstown HC
- 1995–1998: Harbourside HC
- 1998-1999: Csömör KSK (HUN)
- 1999–2001: Sydney University Handball Club
- 2001–2003: Drammen HK
- 2003–2005: Kjelsås IL
- 2005–2006: Al-Gharafa SC
- 2006–2010: Canberra Handball
National team
Years	Team	Apps	(Gls)
1994–2009	Australia	68	(191)

Teams managed
- 2006 – 2010: Canberra Handball Club
- 2010 – 2011: Southern Stars
- 2009 – 2013: Australia (Head coach)
- 2007 – 2016: Canberra Handball Club
- 2016 – 2021: Kosovo (Head coach)
- 2021 –: Australia (Head coach)

Taip Ramadani (born 1 January 1972) is an Australian handball coach, former Australian national team player who played in the Sydney 2000 Olympics.

== Playing career ==
Ramadani played with various Sydney clubs before transferring to Hungarian club Csömör KSK in 1998. In 2001, Ramadani joined Norwegian club Drammen HK and in 2005 he transferred to Qatar's Al Gharrafa club. In 2006, Ramadani founded the Canberra Handball Club which, in its inaugural season, and in 2010, won the New South Wales League.

Ramadani played 68 international matches for Australia, scoring 191 goals, between 1993 and 2009. He competed at the Sydney 2000 Olympic Games and four IHF World Championships: Egypt 1999, Portugal 2003, Tunisia 2005 and Croatia 2009. In 2009, he made a return to International Handball with four appearances for Australia at the Croatia 2009, where he was also the assistant coach of the team.

== Coaching career ==
Handball Australia appointed Ramadani as the head coach of the national men's program in September 2021, for a second term with the Australian men's team. He previously led Australia between 2009 and 2013. A period that included the 2011 Handball World Championships in Sweden, and the 2013 Handball World Championships in Spain.

Between 2016 and 2021, Ramadani was the head coach of the Kosovo men's national team. Ramadani led the team to bronze medal at the 2017 IHF Trophy, and to their first international points in European Championship and World Championship qualification tournaments.

== Personal life ==
Ramadani was born in Sydney, Australia on 1 January 1972. He is of Albanian origin.
