= Vanuatu women's national handball team =

Vanuatu

Information

Colours
1st	2nd

Results

Summer Olympics
- Appearances: None

World Championship
- Appearances: None

Pacific Handball Cup
- Appearances: 1 (First in 2007)
- Best result: 4th
- Last updated on 9 January 2016.

The Vanuatu women's national handball team is the national handball team of Vanuatu.

== Oceania Handball Nations Cup record ==
Year	Position
Auckland 2007	4th
Total	1/2
