= 2005 Pacific Women's Handball Cup =

The 2005 Women's Pacific Handball Cup was held in Sydney, Australia between May 25 and 27, 2005.

The competition participants host Australia, New Zealand, Tahiti, and New Caledonia.

Hosts Australia were the winners and undefeated all tournament. The next three teams were separated by goal difference only with New Caledonia claiming second Tahiti third and New Zealand fourth.

== Results ==
Team	Pld	W	D	L	GF	GA	GD	Pts
Australia	3	3	0	0	66	48	+18	6
New Caledonia	3	1	0	2	52	61	−9	2
French Polynesia	3	1	0	2	47	60	−13	2
New Zealand	3	1	0	2	47	63	−16	2

25 May; 18:00	New Zealand	14 - 13	French Polynesia	Sydney, Australia
25 May; 18:00		(6 - 6)		Sydney, Australia

20:00	Australia	26 – 16	New Caledonia	Sydney, Australia
20:00		(9 - 10)		Sydney, Australia

27 May; 16:00	French Polynesia	19 – 17	New Caledonia	Sydney, Australia
27 May; 16:00		(9 - 8)		Sydney, Australia

20:00	Australia	31 – 17	New Zealand	Sydney, Australia
20:00		(17 - 12)		Sydney, Australia

28 May; 16:00	French Polynesia	28 – 21	New Zealand	Sydney, Australia
28 May; 16:00		(15 - 9)		Sydney, Australia

20:00	Australia	26 - 19	New Caledonia	Sydney, Australia
20:00		(14 - 7)		Sydney, Australia

== Rankings ==
Classification
1st place, gold medalist(s)	Australia
2nd place, silver medalist(s)	New Caledonia
3rd place, bronze medalist(s)	French Polynesia
4	New Zealand
