= 2017 French Pacific Junior Men's Handball Cup =

The 2017 Junior Men's French Pacific Handball Championship was held in Bluesky Sports Arena, Rarotonga, Cook Islands on 3 August, 2017 during the 2017 Oceania Men's Handball Challenge Trophy.

The competition participants Tahiti, and New Caledonia. Wallis and Futuna did not send a team.

The winners were Tahiti over New Caledonia.

== Results ==
3 August, 2017; 13:00	New Caledonia	19 - 34	French Polynesia	Bluesky Sports Arena, Cook Islands

== Rankings ==
Classification
1st place, gold medalist(s)	French Polynesia
2nd place, silver medalist(s)	New Caledonia
DNS	Wallis and Futuna
