= 1994 Oceania Handball Championship =

Tournament details
- Host country: Australia
- Venue: 1 (in 1 host city)
- Dates: 20–21 August
- Teams: 2 (from 1 confederation)

Final positions
- Champions: Australia (1st title)
- Runners-up: New Zealand

Tournament statistics
- Matches played: 2
- Goals scored: 71 (35.5 per match)

The 1994 Oceania Handball Championship was the first edition of the Oceania Handball Nations Cup, which took place in Canberra, Australia from 20 to 21 August 1994. Entered nations were Australia, Vanuatu and New Zealand, but Vanuatu did not compete. Australia won the right to play Romania for a spot in the World Cup.

== Table ==
Team	Pld	W	D	L	GF	GA	GD	Pts
Australia (H)	2	2	0	0	49	22	+27	4
New Zealand	2	0	0	2	22	49	−27	0
Vanuatu	0	0	0	0	0	0	0	0

(H) Hosts

== Results ==
20 August 1994	Australia	36–12	New Zealand	Australian Institute of Sport

21 August 1994	New Zealand	10–23	Australia	Australian Institute of Sport
