= Oceania Handball Nations Cup =

Oceania national handball teams competition (1994–2018)

- Sport: Handball
- Founded: 1994
- First season: 1994
- Folded: 2018
- No. of teams: Various
- Continent: OCHF (Oceania)
- Most titles: Men: Australia (8 titles); Women: Australia (7 titles)

The Oceania Handball Nations Championship was the official competition for senior national handball teams of Oceania, and took place every two years. In addition to crowning the Oceania champions, the tournament also served as a qualifying tournament for the World Handball Championship. Also played is the Pacific Handball Cup where states of other countries such as New Caledonia, Tahiti and Wallis and Futuna (France) and Marshall Islands, Guam and American Samoa (USA) who are ineligible for International Handball Federation world championship events, compete against member nations.

== Men's tournament ==
=== Summary ===
Year	Hosts	Final			Third place match		
Year	Hosts	Champions	Score	Runners-up	Third place	Score	Fourth place
1994; Details	(Australia) Canberra	Australia	59–22; 2 legs	New Zealand	Two teams only		
1996; Details	(New Zealand) Porirua	Australia	48–33; 2 legs	New Zealand	Two teams only		
2002; Details	(Australia) Sydney	Australia	Round robin	Vanuatu	Cook Islands	Three teams only	
2004; Details	(Australia) Sydney	Australia	Round robin	New Zealand	Cook Islands	Three teams only	
2006; Details	(Australia) Sydney	Australia	Round robin	New Zealand	Cook Islands	Three teams only	
2008; Details	(New Zealand) Wellington	New Caledonia	Round robin	Australia	Cook Islands	Round robin	New Zealand
2010; Details	(New Zealand) Porirua	Australia	Round robin	New Zealand	Cook Islands	Three teams only	
2012; Details	(Australia) Sydney	Australia	62–20; 2 legs	New Zealand	Two teams only		
2014; Details	(New Zealand) Auckland	Australia	54–36; 2 legs	New Zealand	Two teams only		
See Asian Handball Championship

=== Medal table ===
Rank	Nation	Gold	Silver	Bronze	Total
1	Australia	8	1	0	9
2	New Caledonia	1	0	0	1
3	New Zealand	0	7	0	7
4	Vanuatu	0	1	0	1
5	Cook Islands	0	0	5	5
Totals (5 entries)		9	9	5	23

=== Participating nations ===
Nation	(Australia) 1994	(New Zealand) 1996	(Australia) 2002	(Australia) 2004	(Australia) 2006	(New Zealand) 2008	(New Zealand) 2010	(Australia) 2012	(Australia) 2014	Years
Australia	1st	1st	1st	1st	1st	2nd	1st	1st	1st	9
Cook Islands	–	–	3rd	3rd	3rd	3rd	3rd	–	–	5
New Caledonia	–	–	–	–	–	1st	–	–	–	1
New Zealand	2nd	2nd	–	2nd	2nd	4th	2nd	2nd	2nd	8
Vanuatu	–	–	2nd	–	–	–	–	–	–	1
Teams	2	2	3	3	3	4	3	2	2	

== Women's tournament ==
=== Summary ===
Year	Hosts	Final			Third place match		
Year	Hosts	Champions	Score	Runners-up	Third place	Score	Fourth place
1997; Details	(Australia) Melbourne	Australia	49–22; 2 legs	New Zealand	Two teams only		
2005; Details	(Australia) Sydney	Australia	69–29; 2 legs	New Zealand	Two teams only		
2007; Details	(Australia) Sydney	Australia	Round robin	NZ Handball Federation (Note: There were two NGOs for handball in New Zealand. The Handball New Zealand (HNZ) and New Zealand Handball Federation (NZHF). The HNZ was suspended by New Zealand Olympic Committee in 2006. Both NGOs sent teams to the qualification.)	Handball New Zealand	Round robin	Three teams only
2009; Details	(Australia) Brisbane	Australia	Round robin	Queensland	NZ Handball Federation	Round robin	Handball New Zealand
2011; Details	(New Zealand) Wellington	Australia	47–28; 2 legs	New Zealand	Two teams only		
2013; Details	(New Zealand) Wellington	Australia	50–35; 2 legs	New Zealand	Two teams only		
2016; Details	(Australia) Sydney	Australia	57–21; 2 legs	New Zealand	Two teams only		
See Asian Handball Championship

=== Medal table ===
Rank	Nation	Gold	Silver	Bronze	Total
1	Australia	7	0	0	7
2	New Zealand	0	6	2	8
3	Queensland	0	1	0	1
Totals (3 entries)		7	7	2	16

=== Participating nations ===
Nation	(Australia) 1997	(Australia) 2005	(Australia) 2007	(Australia) 2009	(New Zealand) 2011	(New Zealand) 2013	(Australia) 2016	Years
Australia	1st	1st	1st	1st	1st	1st	1st	7
NZ Handball Federation			2nd	3rd	2nd	2nd	2nd	5
Handball New Zealand	2nd	2nd	3rd	4th				4
Queensland				2nd				1
Teams	2	2	3	4	2	2	2	
