= 2007 Pacific Women's Handball Cup =

The 2007 Women's Pacific Handball Cup was held in Auckland, New Zealand from 25–26 May 2007. It featured participants New Zealand, Tahiti, Vanuatu and New Caledonia.

New Caledonia were the winners and undefeated all tournament. Next was New Zealand claiming second Tahiti third and Vanuatu fourth.

== Results ==
Team	Pld	W	D	L	GF	GA	GD	Pts
New Caledonia	3	3	0	0	78	52	+26	6
New Zealand	3	2	0	1	69	60	+9	4
French Polynesia	3	1	0	2	50	52	−2	2
Vanuatu	3	0	0	3	35	68	−33	0

25 May 2007; 18:30	Tahiti	bt	Vanuatu

25 May 2007; 20:30	New Caledonia	19–18	New Zealand

26 May 2007; 9:30	New Zealand	27–25	Tahiti

26 May 2007; 11:30	New Caledonia	34–19	Vanuatu

26 May 2007; 15:30	New Caledonia	25–15	Tahiti

26 May 2007; 16:30	New Zealand	24–16	Vanuatu

== Rankings ==
Classification
1st place, gold medalist(s)	New Caledonia
2nd place, silver medalist(s)	New Zealand
3rd place, bronze medalist(s)	French Polynesia
4	Vanuatu
