= Bevan Calvert =

Australian handball player

Bevan Calvert (born in Sydney on 4 April 1986) is an Australian handball player who formerly played for THW Kiel.

== Career ==
He debuted on an international level in January 2005 and played for THW Kiel of Germany. In the past he has served as team captain of the Australia men's national handball team.

== Honours ==
- Handball-Bundesliga: 2020-21
- DHB-Supercup: 2020

== Personal life ==
He is of Filipino Australian ancestry.
