= 2004 Pacific Handball Cup =

Tournament details
- Host country: Australia
- Venue: 1 (in 1 host city)
- Dates: 7–13 June
- Teams: 3 (from 1 confederation)

Final positions
- Champions: Australia (1st title)
- Runners-up: New Caledonia
- Third place: French Polynesia

Tournament statistics
- Matches played: 7
- Goals scored: 373 (53.29 per match)

The 2004 Men's Pacific Handball Cup was held in Sydney, Australia between 7 and 13 June 2004. It was simultaneously hold with the 2004 Oceania Handball Championship.

The competition participants host Australia, New Zealand, Tahiti, Cook Islands and New Caledonia.

Hosts Australia were the winners and undefeated all tournament. New Caledonia in the final were runners up followed by Tahiti, New Zealand and Cook Islands.

== Results ==
=== Group A ===
Team	Pld	W	D	L	GF	GA	GD	Pts
Australia	2	2	0	0	62	47	+15	4
French Polynesia	2	0	0	2	47	62	−15	0

Source: Results

10 June; 19:00	Australia	33 - 28	French Polynesia	State Sports Centre, Sydney; Referees: Josic, Rudic
10 June; 19:00	McCormack 10	(21 - 13)	Haatani 9	State Sports Centre, Sydney; Referees: Josic, Rudic
10 June; 19:00	2× (yellow card) 7× (suspension)	Report	3× (yellow card) 7× (suspension)	State Sports Centre, Sydney; Referees: Josic, Rudic

12 June; 19:00	Australia	29 – 19	French Polynesia	State Sports Centre, Sydney; Referees: Josic, Rudic
12 June; 19:00	McCormack 12	(12 - 11)	Farahei 8	State Sports Centre, Sydney; Referees: Josic, Rudic
12 June; 19:00	3× (yellow card) 5× (suspension) 1× (red card)	Report	3× (yellow card) 5× (suspension) 1× (red card)	State Sports Centre, Sydney; Referees: Josic, Rudic

=== Group B ===
Team	Pld	W	D	L	GF	GA	GD	Pts
New Caledonia	2	2	0	0	78	26	+52	4
New Zealand	2	1	0	1	59	54	+5	2
Cook Islands	2	0	0	2	27	84	−57	0

Source: Results

10 June; 13:00	New Zealand	21 – 32	New Caledonia	State Sports Centre, Sydney; Referees: Geibel, Vujaktija
10 June; 13:00	Vögele 10	(9 - 13)	Malarde 9	State Sports Centre, Sydney; Referees: Geibel, Vujaktija
10 June; 13:00	3× (yellow card) 3× (suspension)	Report	3× (yellow card) 5× (suspension)	State Sports Centre, Sydney; Referees: Geibel, Vujaktija

11 June; 13:00	New Zealand	38 – 22	Cook Islands	State Sports Centre, Sydney; Referees: Adams, Geipel
11 June; 13:00	Vögele 9	(21 - 9)	Hoskings 12	State Sports Centre, Sydney; Referees: Adams, Geipel
11 June; 13:00	2× (yellow card)	Report	3× (yellow card) 5× (suspension)	State Sports Centre, Sydney; Referees: Adams, Geipel

12 June; 13:00	New Caledonia	48 – 5	Cook Islands	State Sports Centre, Sydney; Referees: Josic, Paçasovic
12 June; 13:00	Trocas 15	(22 - 4)	Hoskings 2	State Sports Centre, Sydney; Referees: Josic, Paçasovic
12 June; 13:00	1× (yellow card)	Report		State Sports Centre, Sydney; Referees: Josic, Paçasovic

=== Third place game ===
13 June; 13:00	French Polynesia	34 - 29	New Zealand	State Sports Centre, Sydney; Referees: Adams, Gavrilovic
13 June; 13:00	Haatani 9	(20 - 15)	Vögele 16	State Sports Centre, Sydney; Referees: Adams, Gavrilovic
13 June; 13:00	3× (yellow card) 4× (suspension)	Report	2× (yellow card) 3× (suspension)	State Sports Centre, Sydney; Referees: Adams, Gavrilovic

=== Final ===
13 June; 19:00	Australia	28 - 19	New Caledonia	State Sports Centre, Sydney; Referees: Josic, Rudic
13 June; 19:00	McCormack 10	(16 - 10)	Doui 4	State Sports Centre, Sydney; Referees: Josic, Rudic
13 June; 19:00	3× (yellow card) 3× (suspension)	Report	3× (yellow card) 2× (suspension)	State Sports Centre, Sydney; Referees: Josic, Rudic

== Rankings ==
Classification
1st place, gold medalist(s)	Australia
2nd place, silver medalist(s)	New Caledonia
3rd place, bronze medalist(s)	French Polynesia
4	New Zealand
5	Cook Islands

== Friendly matches ==
7 June; 19:00	French Polynesia	38 - 12	Cook Islands	State Sports Centre, Sydney; Referees: Josic, Rudic
7 June; 19:00	Farahei 8	(17 - 3)	Ford 5	State Sports Centre, Sydney; Referees: Josic, Rudic
7 June; 19:00	2× (yellow card) 4× (suspension)	Report	1× (yellow card) 5× (suspension)	State Sports Centre, Sydney; Referees: Josic, Rudic

8 June; 13:00	New Zealand	21 - 25	French Polynesia	State Sports Centre, Sydney; Referees: Geibel, Vujaktija
8 June; 13:00	Vögele 13	(7 - 13)	Farahei 5	State Sports Centre, Sydney; Referees: Geibel, Vujaktija
8 June; 13:00	3× (yellow card) 1× (suspension)	Report	3× (yellow card) 4× (suspension)	State Sports Centre, Sydney; Referees: Geibel, Vujaktija

9 June; 19:00	Australia	27 - 22	New Caledonia	State Sports Centre, Sydney; Referees: Josic, Rudic
9 June; 19:00	McCormack 9	(14 - 13)	Malarde 6	State Sports Centre, Sydney; Referees: Josic, Rudic
9 June; 19:00	3× (yellow card) 6× (suspension) 1× (red card)	Report	4× (yellow card) 4× (suspension) 1× (red card)	State Sports Centre, Sydney; Referees: Josic, Rudic

9 June; 19:00	Australia	24 - 18	New Caledonia	State Sports Centre, Sydney; Referees: Josic, Rudic
9 June; 19:00	Lucas 6	(13 - 12)	Malarde 5	State Sports Centre, Sydney; Referees: Josic, Rudic
9 June; 19:00	3× (yellow card) 3× (suspension)	Report	3× (yellow card) 2× (suspension)	State Sports Centre, Sydney; Referees: Josic, Rudic
