= 2004 Oceania Handball Championship =

Tournament details
- Host country: Australia
- Venue: 1 (in 1 host city)
- Dates: 7–9 June
- Teams: 3 (from 1 confederation)

Final positions
- Champions: Australia (4th title)
- Runners-up: New Zealand
- Third place: Cook Islands

Tournament statistics
- Matches played: 3
- Goals scored: 136 (45.33 per match)

The 2004 Oceania Handball Championship was the fourth edition of the Oceania Handball Nations Cup, which took place in Sydney, Australia from 7 to 9 June 2004. Entered nations were Australia, Cook Islands and the New Zealand. Australia won the right to play in the 2005 World Men's Handball Championship in Tunisia. It was simultaneously hold with the 2004 Pacific Handball Cup.

== Table ==
Team	Pld	W	D	L	GF	GA	GD	Pts
Australia (H)	2	2	0	0	74	26	+48	4
New Zealand	2	1	0	1	40	35	+5	2
Cook Islands	2	0	0	2	22	75	−53	0

Source: Results
(H) Hosts

== Results ==
All times are local (UTC+10).

7 June 2004; 13:00	Australia	26–13	New Zealand	State Sports Centre, Sydney; Referees: Adams, Geipel
7 June 2004; 13:00	McCormack 10	(11–8)	3 players 3	State Sports Centre, Sydney; Referees: Adams, Geipel
7 June 2004; 13:00	3× (yellow card) 3× (suspension)	Report	3× (yellow card) 1× (suspension)	State Sports Centre, Sydney; Referees: Adams, Geipel

8 June 2004; 19:00	Australia	48–13	Cook Islands	State Sports Centre, Sydney; Referees: Josic, Rudic
8 June 2004; 19:00	Schofield 10	(20–8)	Titaa 5	State Sports Centre, Sydney; Referees: Josic, Rudic
8 June 2004; 19:00	1× (yellow card) 4× (suspension)	Report	3× (yellow card) 6× (suspension)	State Sports Centre, Sydney; Referees: Josic, Rudic

9 June 2004; 17:00	New Zealand	27–9	Cook Islands	State Sports Centre, Sydney; Referees: Adams, Geipel
9 June 2004; 17:00	Kocsis 7	(10–6)	Vati 4	State Sports Centre, Sydney; Referees: Adams, Geipel
9 June 2004; 17:00	2× (yellow card) 2× (suspension)	Report	3× (yellow card) 2× (suspension)	State Sports Centre, Sydney; Referees: Adams, Geipel
