= 2008 Oceania Handball Championship =

Tournament details
- Host country: New Zealand
- Venue: 1 (in 1 host city)
- Dates: 7–10 April
- Teams: 4 (from 1 confederation)

Final positions
- Champions: New Caledonia (1st title)
- Runners-up: Australia
- Third place: Cook Islands
- Fourth place: New Zealand

Tournament statistics
- Matches played: 6
- Goals scored: 286 (47.67 per match)

The 2008 Oceania Handball Championship was the sixth edition of the Oceania Handball Nations Cup, which took place in Wellington, New Zealand from 7 to 10 April 2008. Entered nations were Australia, Cook Islands, New Caledonia and New Zealand. Although New Caledonia won the tournament, they are ineligible to go to the 2009 World Men's Handball Championship as they are a French colony. Australia won the right to represent Oceania by coming second.

== Table ==
Team	Pld	W	D	L	GF	GA	GD	Pts
New Caledonia	3	3	0	0	103	35	+68	6
Australia	3	2	0	1	85	48	+37	4
Cook Islands	3	1	0	2	50	98	−48	2
New Zealand (H)	3	0	0	3	48	105	−57	0

(H) Hosts

== Results ==
All times are local (UTC+12).

7 April 2008	Australia	15–20	New Caledonia	TSB Bank Arena, Wellington
7 April 2008		(7–10)		TSB Bank Arena, Wellington

7 April 2008	Cook Islands	27–23	New Zealand	TSB Bank Arena, Wellington
7 April 2008		(11–9)		TSB Bank Arena, Wellington

8 April 2008	Cook Islands	11–32	Australia	TSB Bank Arena, Wellington
8 April 2008		(6–15)		TSB Bank Arena, Wellington

8 April 2008	New Zealand	8–40	New Caledonia	TSB Bank Arena, Wellington
8 April 2008		(5–21)		TSB Bank Arena, Wellington

10 April 2008	Cook Islands	12–43	New Caledonia	TSB Bank Arena, Wellington
10 April 2008		(9–20)		TSB Bank Arena, Wellington

10 April 2008	New Zealand	17–38	Australia	TSB Bank Arena, Wellington
10 April 2008		(8–23)		TSB Bank Arena, Wellington
