= New Caledonia women's national handball team =

New Caledonia

Information
- Association: FFHB Ligue De Handball Nouvelle Caledonie

Colours
1st	2nd

Results

Summer Olympics
- Appearances: Not eligible

World Championship
- Appearances: Not eligible

Pacific Handball Cup
- Appearances: 2 (First in 2005)
- Best result: Winner, 2007
- Last updated on 7 January, 2016.

The New Caledonia women's national handball team is the national female handball team of New Caledonia.

== Pacific Handball Cup record ==
Year	Position
Sydney 2005	2nd
Sydney 2007	1st
Total	2/2

== French Pacific Handball Cup record ==
Year	Position
Sydney 2005	1st
Sydney 2007	1st
Total	2/2
