= French Polynesia women's national handball team =

(French Polynesia) Tahiti

Information
- Association: Federation Tahitienne de Handball

Colours
1st	2nd

Results

Summer Olympics
- Appearances: Not eligible

World Championship
- Appearances: Not eligible

Pacific Handball Cup
- Appearances: 2 (First in 2005)
- Best result: (bronze) twice
- Last updated on 7 January 2016.

The French Polynesia women's national handball team is the national women's handball team of Tahiti.

== Pacific Handball Cup record ==
Year	Position
Sydney 2005	3rd
Auckland 2007	3rd
Total	2/2

== French Pacific Handball Cup record ==
Year	Position
Sydney 2005	2nd
Auckland 2007	2nd
Total	2/2
