= 2012 Oceania Handball Championship =

Eighth edition of the Oceania Handball Nations Cup

Tournament details
- Host country: Australia
- Venue: 1 (in 1 host city)
- Dates: 22–23 June
- Teams: 2 (from 1 confederation)

Final positions
- Champions: Australia (7th title)
- Runners-up: New Zealand

Tournament statistics
- Matches played: 2
- Goals scored: 82 (41 per match)
- Top scorers: (Australia) Bevan Calvert (13 goals)

The 2012 Oceania Handball Nations Cup was the eighth edition of the Oceania Handball Nations Cup, held from 22 to 23 June 2012 in Australia. It also acted as the qualifying competition for the 2013 World Men's Handball Championship, securing one vacancy for the World Championship.

Australia and New Zealand played a two-game series to determine the winner.

== Overview ==
Team 1	Agg.	Team 2	1st leg	2nd leg
Australia	62–20	New Zealand	31–10	31–10

All times are local (UTC+10).

== Game 1 ==
22 June 2012; 20:00	Australia	31–10	New Zealand	Dural Sport And Leisure Centre, Sydney; Attendance: 200; Referees: Banatraf, Al-Suwaidi (QAT)
22 June 2012; 20:00	Calvert, Krajnc 5	(15–6)	Palmer 3	Dural Sport And Leisure Centre, Sydney; Attendance: 200; Referees: Banatraf, Al-Suwaidi (QAT)
22 June 2012; 20:00		Report		Dural Sport And Leisure Centre, Sydney; Attendance: 200; Referees: Banatraf, Al-Suwaidi (QAT)

== Game 2 ==
23 June 2012; 16:00	Australia	31–10	New Zealand	Dural Sport And Leisure Centre, Sydney; Referees: Banatraf, Al-Suwaidi (QAT)
23 June 2012; 16:00	Calvert 8	(16–6)	Bradley, McKay 2	Dural Sport And Leisure Centre, Sydney; Referees: Banatraf, Al-Suwaidi (QAT)
23 June 2012; 16:00		Report		Dural Sport And Leisure Centre, Sydney; Referees: Banatraf, Al-Suwaidi (QAT)
