= 2002 Oceania Handball Championship =

Third Oceania Handball Nations Cup

Tournament details
- Host country: Australia
- Venue: 1 (in 1 host city)
- Dates: 5–7 July
- Teams: 3 (from 1 confederation)

Final positions
- Champions: Australia (3rd title)
- Runners-up: Vanuatu
- Third place: Cook Islands

Tournament statistics
- Matches played: 3
- Goals scored: 158 (52.67 per match)

The 2002 Handball Championship was the third edition of the Oceania Handball Nations Cup, which took place at the Sleeman Centre in Brisbane, Australia from 5 to 7 July 2002. By winning, Australia secured the Oceania bid for the 2003 World Men's Handball Championship in Portugal. Participating nations were Australia, Vanuatu and the Cook Islands.

== Standings ==
Team	Pld	W	D	L	GF	GA	GD	Pts
Australia (H)	2	2	0	0	86	21	+65	4
Vanuatu	2	1	0	1	48	68	−20	2
Cook Islands	2	0	0	2	24	69	−45	0

(H) Hosts

== Results ==
All times are local (UTC+10).

5 July 2002; 19:30	Vanuatu	34–17	Cook Islands	Sydney, Australia
5 July 2002; 19:30		(14–7)		Sydney, Australia

6 July 2002; 19:30	Australia	35–7	Cook Islands	Sydney, Australia
6 July 2002; 19:30		(17–2)		Sydney, Australia

7 July 2002; 10:30	Australia	51–14	Vanuatu	Sydney, Australia
7 July 2002; 10:30		(24–7)		Sydney, Australia
