= 2006 Oceania Handball Championship =

Tournament details
- Host country: Australia
- Venue: 1 (in 1 host city)
- Dates: 22–24 May
- Teams: 3 (from 1 confederation)

Final positions
- Champions: Australia (5th title)
- Runners-up: New Zealand
- Third place: Cook Islands

Tournament statistics
- Matches played: 3
- Goals scored: 171 (57 per match)

The 2006 Oceania Handball Championship was the fifth edition of the Oceania Handball Nations Cup, which took place in Sydney, Australia from 22 to 24 May 2006. Entered nations were Australia, Cook Islands and New Zealand. Australia won the right to play in the 2007 World Men's Handball Championship in Germany.

== Table ==
Team	Pld	W	D	L	GF	GA	GD	Pts
Australia (H)	2	2	0	0	104	19	+85	4
New Zealand	2	1	0	1	50	53	−3	2
Cook Islands	2	0	0	2	17	99	−82	0

(H) Hosts

== Results ==
All times are local (UTC+10).

22 May 2006; 18:30	Australia	41–14	New Zealand	Dural Sports Centre, Sydney
22 May 2006; 18:30		(16–5)		Dural Sports Centre, Sydney

23 May 2006; 18:00	Cook Islands	5–63	Australia	Dural Sports Centre, Sydney
23 May 2006; 18:00		(31–1)		Dural Sports Centre, Sydney

24 May 2006; 18:00	Cook Islands	12–36	New Zealand	Dural Sports Centre, Sydney
24 May 2006; 18:00		(4–17)		Dural Sports Centre, Sydney
