= 1996 Oceania Handball Championship =

Tournament details
- Host country: New Zealand
- Venue(s): 1 (in 1 host city)
- Dates: 8–9 December
- Teams: 2 (from 1 confederation)

Final positions
- Champions: Australia (2nd title)
- Runners-up: New Zealand

Tournament statistics
- Matches played: 2
- Goals scored: 81 (40.5 per match)

The 1996 Oceania Handball Nations Cup was the second edition of the Oceania Handball Nations Cup, held from 8 to 9 December 1996 in Porirua, New Zealand. The winner would play Lithuania in the qualifying competition for the 1997 World Men's Handball Championship.

Australia and New Zealand played a two-game series to determine the winner.

== Overview ==
Team 1	Agg.	Team 2	1st leg	2nd leg
Australia	48–23	New Zealand	19–13	29–20

== Game 1 ==
8 December 1996	Australia	19–13	New Zealand	Te Rauparana Arena

== Game 2 ==
9 December 1996	New Zealand	20–29	Australia	Te Rauparana Arena
