= 2010 Oceania Handball Championship =

Tournament details
- Host country: New Zealand
- Venue(s): 1 (in 1 host city)
- Dates: 8–10 May
- Teams: 3 (from 1 confederation)

Final positions
- Champions: Australia (6th title)
- Runners-up: New Zealand
- Third place: Cook Islands

Tournament statistics
- Matches played: 6
- Goals scored: 300 (50 per match)

The 2010 Oceania Handball Championship was the seventh edition of the Oceania Handball Nations Cup, which took place in Porirua, New Zealand from 8 to 10 May 2010. By winning, Australia secured the Oceania bid for the 2011 World Men's Handball Championship in Sweden. The tournament was held as a double round robin. Participating nations were Australia, New Zealand and the Cook Islands.

== Table ==
Team	Pld	W	D	L	GF	GA	GD	Pts
Australia	4	4	0	0	147	53	+94	8
New Zealand (H)	4	2	0	2	100	93	+7	4
Cook Islands	4	0	0	4	53	154	−101	0

(H) Hosts

== Results ==
All times are local (UTC+12).

8 May 2010; 10:30	Australia	41–13	Cook Islands	Te Rauparaha Arena
8 May 2010; 10:30		(16–3)		Te Rauparaha Arena
8 May 2010; 10:30		Report		Te Rauparaha Arena

8 May 2010; 19:00	Australia	30–17	New Zealand	Te Rauparaha Arena
8 May 2010; 19:00		(17–7)		Te Rauparaha Arena
8 May 2010; 19:00		Report		Te Rauparaha Arena

9 May 2010; 10:30	New Zealand	16–30	Australia	Te Rauparaha Arena
9 May 2010; 10:30		(6–15)		Te Rauparaha Arena
9 May 2010; 10:30		Report		Te Rauparaha Arena

9 May 2010; 19:00	Cook Islands	21–36	New Zealand	Te Rauparaha Arena
9 May 2010; 19:00		(7–23)		Te Rauparaha Arena
9 May 2010; 19:00		Report		Te Rauparaha Arena

10 May 2010; 10:30	Cook Islands	7–46	Australia	Te Rauparaha Arena
10 May 2010; 10:30		(4–22)		Te Rauparaha Arena
10 May 2010; 10:30		Report		Te Rauparaha Arena

10 May 2010; 19:00	New Zealand	31–12	Cook Islands	Te Rauparaha Arena
10 May 2010; 19:00		(17–5)		Te Rauparaha Arena
10 May 2010; 19:00		Report		Te Rauparaha Arena
