= New Caledonia men's national handball team =

New Caledonia

Information
- Association: FFHB Ligue De Handball Nouvelle Caledonie

Colours
| 1st | 2nd |

Results

Oceania Nations Cup
- Appearances: 1 (First in 2008)
- Best result: Winner (2008)
- Last updated on 6 January 2016.

The New Caledonia national handball team is the national handball team of New Caledonia. They have won the Oceania Handball Nations Cup in 2008 and have finished second in the Pacific Handball Cup twice.

== Results ==
=== Oceania Nations Cup ===
| Year | Position |
|---|---|
| New Zealand 2008 | 1st |
| Total | 1/9 |

=== Pacific Handball Cup ===
| Year | Position |
|---|---|
| Sydney 2004 | 2nd |
| Sydney 2006 | 2nd |
| Total | 2/2 |
