= 2006 Pacific Handball Cup =

The 2006 Men's Pacific Handball Cup was held in Sydney, Australia between May 25 and 27, 2006.

The competition participants host Australia, New Zealand, Cook Islands and New Caledonia.

Hosts Australia were the winners and undefeated all tournament. New Caledonia in the final were runners up followed by New Zealand and Cook Islands.

== Results ==
=== Group results ===
Team	Pld	W	D	L	GF	GA	GD	Pts
Australia	3	3	0	0	108	38	+70	6
New Caledonia	3	2	0	1	86	47	+39	4
New Zealand	3	1	0	2	61	78	−17	2
Cook Islands	3	0	0	3	31	123	−92	0

25 May; 18:00	New Caledonia	37 – 11	Cook Islands	Sydney, Australia
25 May; 18:00		(17 - 5)		Sydney, Australia

20:00	Australia	32 – 15	New Zealand	Sydney, Australia
20:00		(17 - 8)		Sydney, Australia

26 May; 18:00	New Caledonia	32 - 12	New Zealand	Sydney, Australia
26 May; 18:00		(19 - 7)		Sydney, Australia

20:00	Australia	52 - 6	Cook Islands	Sydney, Australia
20:00		(22 - 2)		Sydney, Australia

27 May; 18:00	New Zealand	34 - 14	Cook Islands	Sydney, Australia
27 May; 18:00		(17 - 6)		Sydney, Australia

20:00	Australia	24 - 17	New Caledonia	Sydney, Australia
20:00		(7 - 8)		Sydney, Australia

== Rankings ==
Classification
1st place, gold medalist(s)	Australia
2nd place, silver medalist(s)	New Caledonia
3rd place, bronze medalist(s)	New Zealand
4	Cook Islands
