= Oceania Continent Handball Federation =

Governing body for the Olympic sport of Handball in Oceania

Oceania Continent Handball Federation (OCHF)
- Logo of Oceania Continent Handball Federation
- Predecessor: Oceania Handball Federation (1993 — 2011)
- Formation: 23 October 2014; 11 years ago
- Founded at: Guam
- Type: Continental Sport Federation
- Headquarters: Guam
- Region served: Oceania
- Members: 17 Full Members; 3 Associated Members
- Official language: English
- President: Ricardo Blas
- Secretary General: Makiroa Mitchell-John
- Vice-President: Carl Sagapolutele Floor
- Affiliations: International Handball Federation; Oceania National Olympic Committees

The Oceania Continent Handball Federation (OCHF) is the governing body for the Olympic sport of Handball in Oceania. It was founded in 2014 and is affiliated to the International Handball Federation (IHF) and Asian Handball Federation (AHF).

The OCHF is administered by an executive committee elected annually by its members. The OCHF members are the local governing Handball federations in countries within the Oceania region that are also members of the IHF and AHF.

== History ==
The first Oceania Handball Federation (OHF) was founded on 9 July 1993, by Mr. Alexander Dimitric in Sydney, Australia. In 2009, the Oceania Handball Federation was disbanded.

== OCHF Presidents ==
S. No.	Name	Country	Term
1.	Ricardo Blas	Guam	23 October 2014 – present

== OCHF Members ==
Full Members

- American Samoa
- Australia
- Cook Islands
- Federated States of Micronesia
- Fiji
- Guam
- Kiribati
- Marshall Islands
- Nauru ✝
- New Zealand
- Palau ✝
- Papua New Guinea
- Samoa
- Solomon Islands
- Tonga
- Tuvalu ✝
- Vanuatu

✝ means non-active member

Associated Members

- New Caledonia
- Northern Mariana Islands
- (French Polynesia) Tahiti

== Tournaments ==
=== Nations ===
Indoor

- Oceania Men's Handball Nations Cup
- Oceania Women's Handball Nations Cup
- Oceania Handball Challenge Trophy - Under 21s
- Oceania Youth Handball Championship - Under 19s
- Pacific Handball Cup
- French Pacific Handball Championship

Beach

- Oceania Beach Handball Championship
- Oceania Junior Beach Handball Championship - Under 19's
- Oceania Youth Beach Handball Championship - Under 17's

=== Clubs ===
- Oceania Handball Champions Cup
- Oceania Women's Handball Champions Cup
