= 2020 Asian Men's Handball Championship =

Asian Sports Championship

Tournament details
- Host country: Kuwait
- Venue: 1 (in 1 host city)
- Dates: 16–27 January
- Teams: 13 (from 1 confederation)

Final positions
- Champions: Qatar (4th title)
- Runners-up: South Korea
- Third place: Japan
- Fourth place: Bahrain

Tournament statistics
- Matches played: 43
- Goals scored: 2,372 (55.16 per match)
- Top scorer(s): (New Zealand) Luke Ireland (40 goals)

Awards
- Best player: (Japan) Yuto Agarie

The 2020 Asian Men's Handball Championship was the 19th edition of the championship held under the aegis of Asian Handball Federation in Kuwait City, Kuwait from 16 to 27 January 2020. It acted as the Asian qualifying tournament for the 2021 World Men's Handball Championship.

Qatar won their fourth consecutive title by defeating South Korea 33–21 in the final. Japan defeated Bahrain 27–26 to secure the third place.

== Venues ==
Kuwait City	Kuwait City is located in Kuwait
Shaikh Saad Al-Abdullah Sports Hall Complex	Kuwait City is located in Kuwait
Capacity: 6,000	Kuwait City is located in Kuwait

== Draw ==
The draw was held on 2 November 2019 in the Millennium Hotel & Convention Centre, Salmiya, Kuwait.

=== Seeding ===
Teams were seeded according to the AHF COC regulations and rankings of the previous edition of the championship. Teams who had not participate in the previous edition were in Pot 4.

Pot 1	Pot 2	Pot 3	Pot 4
Qatar; Bahrain; South Korea; Kuwait	Saudi Arabia; Iran; Japan; United Arab Emirates	China; Australia; New Zealand	Iraq; Hong Kong

== Referees ==
The following nine referee pairs were selected by Asian Handball Federation and International Handball Federation for the championship.

Referees
Bahrain	Hussain Al-Mawt; Samir Marhoon
Iran	Alireza Mousavian; Majid Kolahduzan
Japan	Kiyoshi Hizaki; Tomokazu Ikebuchi
Jordan	Akram Al-Zayat; Yasser Awad
Kuwait	Ahmad Abdullah Al-Jaimaz; Abdulrahman Ali Al-Mulla

Referees
Norway	Lars Jørum; Håvard Kleven
Oman	Khamis Al-Wahibi; Omer Al-Shahi
Slovenia	Bojan Lah; David Sok
South Korea	Koo Bon-ok; Lee Seok

== Preliminary round ==
All times are local (UTC+3).

=== Group A ===
Pos	Team	Pld	W	D	L	GF	GA	GD	Pts	Qualification
1	Bahrain	2	2	0	0	67	36	+31	4	Main round
2	Iran	2	1	0	1	73	43	+30	2	Main round
3	New Zealand	2	0	0	2	37	98	−61	0	Placement round

Source: AHF
Rules for classification: 1) points; 2) head-to-head points; 3) head-to-head goal difference; 4) head-to-head number of goals scored; 5) goal difference.

16 January 2020; 13:00	New Zealand	16–45	Bahrain	Shaikh Saad Al-Abdullah Sports Hall Complex, Kuwait City
16 January 2020; 13:00		(8–21)		Shaikh Saad Al-Abdullah Sports Hall Complex, Kuwait City

17 January 2020; 10:00	Iran	53–21	New Zealand	Shaikh Saad Al-Abdullah Sports Hall Complex, Kuwait City
17 January 2020; 10:00		(22–11)		Shaikh Saad Al-Abdullah Sports Hall Complex, Kuwait City

18 January 2020; 13:00	Bahrain	22–20	Iran	Shaikh Saad Al-Abdullah Sports Hall Complex, Kuwait City
18 January 2020; 13:00		(14–11)		Shaikh Saad Al-Abdullah Sports Hall Complex, Kuwait City

=== Group B ===
Pos	Team	Pld	W	D	L	GF	GA	GD	Pts	Qualification
1	Qatar	2	2	0	0	85	46	+39	4	Main round
2	Japan	2	1	0	1	67	52	+15	2	Main round
3	China	2	0	0	2	34	88	−54	0	Placement round

Source: AHF
Rules for classification: 1) points; 2) head-to-head points; 3) head-to-head goal difference; 4) head-to-head number of goals scored; 5) goal difference.

16 January 2020; 15:00	China	18–49	Qatar	Shaikh Saad Al-Abdullah Sports Hall Complex, Kuwait City
16 January 2020; 15:00		(8–23)		Shaikh Saad Al-Abdullah Sports Hall Complex, Kuwait City

17 January 2020; 17:00	Japan	39–16	China	Shaikh Saad Al-Abdullah Sports Hall Complex, Kuwait City
17 January 2020; 17:00		(17–9)		Shaikh Saad Al-Abdullah Sports Hall Complex, Kuwait City

18 January 2020; 17:00	Qatar	36–28	Japan	Shaikh Saad Al-Abdullah Sports Hall Complex, Kuwait City
18 January 2020; 17:00		(16–17)		Shaikh Saad Al-Abdullah Sports Hall Complex, Kuwait City

=== Group C ===
Pos	Team	Pld	W	D	L	GF	GA	GD	Pts	Qualification
1	Saudi Arabia	2	2	0	0	66	42	+24	4	Main round
2	South Korea	2	1	0	1	67	49	+18	2	Main round
3	Australia	2	0	0	2	35	77	−42	0	Placement round

Source: AHF
Rules for classification: 1) points; 2) head-to-head points; 3) head-to-head goal difference; 4) head-to-head number of goals scored; 5) goal difference.

16 January 2020; 17:00	Australia	20–40	South Korea	Shaikh Saad Al-Abdullah Sports Hall Complex, Kuwait City; Referees: Mousavian, Kolahdouzan (IRN)
16 January 2020; 17:00	Gahan, Warrener 5	(7–24)	Kim G. 6	Shaikh Saad Al-Abdullah Sports Hall Complex, Kuwait City; Referees: Mousavian, Kolahdouzan (IRN)
16 January 2020; 17:00	2× (yellow card) 3× (suspension)	Report	1× (suspension)	Shaikh Saad Al-Abdullah Sports Hall Complex, Kuwait City; Referees: Mousavian, Kolahdouzan (IRN)

17 January 2020; 15:00	Saudi Arabia	37–15	Australia	Shaikh Saad Al-Abdullah Sports Hall Complex, Kuwait City
17 January 2020; 15:00		(19–8)		Shaikh Saad Al-Abdullah Sports Hall Complex, Kuwait City

18 January 2020; 11:00	South Korea	27–29	Saudi Arabia	Shaikh Saad Al-Abdullah Sports Hall Complex, Kuwait City; Referees: Al-Mawt, Marhoon (BHR)
18 January 2020; 11:00	Kim J. 9	(15–13)	three players 5	Shaikh Saad Al-Abdullah Sports Hall Complex, Kuwait City; Referees: Al-Mawt, Marhoon (BHR)
18 January 2020; 11:00	1× (yellow card) 5× (suspension)	Report	2× (yellow card) 7× (suspension)	Shaikh Saad Al-Abdullah Sports Hall Complex, Kuwait City; Referees: Al-Mawt, Marhoon (BHR)

=== Group D ===
Pos	Team	Pld	W	D	L	GF	GA	GD	Pts	Qualification
1	Kuwait (H)	3	3	0	0	87	57	+30	6	Main round
2	United Arab Emirates	3	2	0	1	75	50	+25	4	Main round
3	Iraq	3	1	0	2	84	67	+17	2	Placement round
4	Hong Kong	3	0	0	3	51	123	−72	0	Placement round

Source: AHF
Rules for classification: 1) points; 2) head-to-head points; 3) head-to-head goal difference; 4) head-to-head number of goals scored; 5) goal difference.
(H) Hosts

16 January 2020; 11:00	Hong Kong	11–38	United Arab Emirates	Shaikh Saad Al-Abdullah Sports Hall Complex, Kuwait City
16 January 2020; 11:00		(4–21)		Shaikh Saad Al-Abdullah Sports Hall Complex, Kuwait City

16 January 2020; 20:00	Iraq	22–25	Kuwait	Shaikh Saad Al-Abdullah Sports Hall Complex, Kuwait City
16 January 2020; 20:00		(11–13)		Shaikh Saad Al-Abdullah Sports Hall Complex, Kuwait City

17 January 2020; 17:00	Iraq	19–20	United Arab Emirates	Shaikh Saad Al-Abdullah Sports Hall Complex, Kuwait City
17 January 2020; 17:00		(8–10)		Shaikh Saad Al-Abdullah Sports Hall Complex, Kuwait City

17 January 2020; 19:00	Hong Kong	18–42	Kuwait	Shaikh Saad Al-Abdullah Sports Hall Complex, Kuwait City
17 January 2020; 19:00		(11–18)		Shaikh Saad Al-Abdullah Sports Hall Complex, Kuwait City

18 January 2020; 15:00	Hong Kong	22–43	Iraq	Shaikh Saad Al-Abdullah Sports Hall Complex, Kuwait City
18 January 2020; 15:00		(9–24)		Shaikh Saad Al-Abdullah Sports Hall Complex, Kuwait City

18 January 2020; 19:00	Kuwait	20–17	United Arab Emirates	Shaikh Saad Al-Abdullah Sports Hall Complex, Kuwait City; Referees: Koo, Lee (KOR)
18 January 2020; 19:00		(11–10)		Shaikh Saad Al-Abdullah Sports Hall Complex, Kuwait City; Referees: Koo, Lee (KOR)

== Placement round ==
=== Group 3 ===
Pos	Team	Pld	W	D	L	GF	GA	GD	Pts
9	Iraq	4	4	0	0	153	111	+42	8
10	Hong Kong	4	3	0	1	114	116	−2	6
11	China	4	2	0	2	127	123	+4	4
12	Australia	4	1	0	3	105	106	−1	2
13	New Zealand	4	0	0	4	111	154	−43	0

Source: AHF
Rules for classification: 1) points; 2) head-to-head points; 3) head-to-head goal difference; 4) head-to-head number of goals scored; 5) goal difference.

20 January 2020; 10:00	Iraq	38–31	China	Shaikh Saad Al-Abdullah Sports Hall Complex, Kuwait City
20 January 2020; 10:00		(17–13)		Shaikh Saad Al-Abdullah Sports Hall Complex, Kuwait City

20 January 2020; 12:00	Hong Kong	34–30	New Zealand	Shaikh Saad Al-Abdullah Sports Hall Complex, Kuwait City
20 January 2020; 12:00		(17–9)		Shaikh Saad Al-Abdullah Sports Hall Complex, Kuwait City

21 January 2020; 10:00	Australia	26–31	Iraq	Shaikh Saad Al-Abdullah Sports Hall Complex, Kuwait City
21 January 2020; 10:00		(15–18)		Shaikh Saad Al-Abdullah Sports Hall Complex, Kuwait City

21 January 2020; 12:00	China	27–32	Hong Kong	Shaikh Saad Al-Abdullah Sports Hall Complex, Kuwait City
21 January 2020; 12:00		(16–15)		Shaikh Saad Al-Abdullah Sports Hall Complex, Kuwait City

23 January 2020; 10:00	Australia	25–28	China	Shaikh Saad Al-Abdullah Sports Hall Complex, Kuwait City; Referees: Al-Wahibi, Al-Shahi (OMA)
23 January 2020; 10:00		(13–14)		Shaikh Saad Al-Abdullah Sports Hall Complex, Kuwait City; Referees: Al-Wahibi, Al-Shahi (OMA)

23 January 2020; 12:00	Iraq	42–29	New Zealand	Shaikh Saad Al-Abdullah Sports Hall Complex, Kuwait City; Referees: Al-Jaimaz, Al-Mulla (KUW)
23 January 2020; 12:00		(22–13)		Shaikh Saad Al-Abdullah Sports Hall Complex, Kuwait City; Referees: Al-Jaimaz, Al-Mulla (KUW)

25 January 2020; 10:00	Hong Kong	25–42	Iraq	Shaikh Saad Al-Abdullah Sports Hall Complex, Kuwait City
25 January 2020; 10:00		(13–25)		Shaikh Saad Al-Abdullah Sports Hall Complex, Kuwait City

25 January 2020; 12:00	Australia	37–24	New Zealand	Shaikh Saad Al-Abdullah Sports Hall Complex, Kuwait City
25 January 2020; 12:00		(19–10)		Shaikh Saad Al-Abdullah Sports Hall Complex, Kuwait City

26 January 2020; 15:00	Hong Kong	23–17	Australia	Shaikh Saad Al-Abdullah Sports Hall Complex, Kuwait City; Referees: Al-Jaimaz, Al-Mulla (KUW)
26 January 2020; 15:00		(11–9)		Shaikh Saad Al-Abdullah Sports Hall Complex, Kuwait City; Referees: Al-Jaimaz, Al-Mulla (KUW)

26 January 2020; 17:00	New Zealand	28–41	China	Shaikh Saad Al-Abdullah Sports Hall Complex, Kuwait City; Referees: Al-Wahibi, Al-Shahi (OMA)
26 January 2020; 17:00		(15–18)		Shaikh Saad Al-Abdullah Sports Hall Complex, Kuwait City; Referees: Al-Wahibi, Al-Shahi (OMA)

== Main round ==
=== Group 1 ===
Pos	Team	Pld	W	D	L	GF	GA	GD	Pts	Qualification
1	Japan	3	3	0	0	86	64	+22	6	Semifinals
2	Bahrain	3	2	0	1	70	60	+10	4	Semifinals
3	United Arab Emirates	3	1	0	2	60	80	−20	2	Fifth place game
4	Saudi Arabia	3	0	0	3	59	71	−12	0	Seventh place game

Source: AHF
Rules for classification: 1) points; 2) head-to-head points; 3) head-to-head goal difference; 4) head-to-head number of goals scored; 5) goal difference.

20 January 2020; 14:00	United Arab Emirates	18–29	Bahrain	Shaikh Saad Al-Abdullah Sports Hall Complex, Kuwait City
20 January 2020; 14:00		(9–15)		Shaikh Saad Al-Abdullah Sports Hall Complex, Kuwait City

20 January 2020; 16:00	Saudi Arabia	22–30	Japan	Shaikh Saad Al-Abdullah Sports Hall Complex, Kuwait City
20 January 2020; 16:00		(10–16)		Shaikh Saad Al-Abdullah Sports Hall Complex, Kuwait City

21 January 2020; 14:00	Bahrain	23–25	Japan	Shaikh Saad Al-Abdullah Sports Hall Complex, Kuwait City
21 January 2020; 14:00		(11–10)		Shaikh Saad Al-Abdullah Sports Hall Complex, Kuwait City

21 January 2020; 16:00	United Arab Emirates	23–20	Saudi Arabia	Shaikh Saad Al-Abdullah Sports Hall Complex, Kuwait City
21 January 2020; 16:00		(14–10)		Shaikh Saad Al-Abdullah Sports Hall Complex, Kuwait City

23 January 2020; 14:00	Japan	31–19	United Arab Emirates	Shaikh Saad Al-Abdullah Sports Hall Complex, Kuwait City; Referees: Al-Mawt, Marhoon (BHR)
23 January 2020; 14:00		(18–13)		Shaikh Saad Al-Abdullah Sports Hall Complex, Kuwait City; Referees: Al-Mawt, Marhoon (BHR)

23 January 2020; 16:00	Bahrain	18–17	Saudi Arabia	Shaikh Saad Al-Abdullah Sports Hall Complex, Kuwait City; Referees: Kleven, Jørum (NOR)
23 January 2020; 16:00		(10–6)		Shaikh Saad Al-Abdullah Sports Hall Complex, Kuwait City; Referees: Kleven, Jørum (NOR)

=== Group 2 ===
Pos	Team	Pld	W	D	L	GF	GA	GD	Pts	Qualification
1	Qatar	3	3	0	0	94	75	+19	6	Semifinals
2	South Korea	3	1	1	1	85	85	0	3 (Note: Iran 24–24 South Korea)	Semifinals
3	Iran	3	1	1	1	77	79	−2	3	Fifth place game
4	Kuwait (H)	3	0	0	3	74	91	−17	0	Seventh place game

Source: AHF
Rules for classification: 1) points; 2) head-to-head points; 3) head-to-head goal difference; 4) head-to-head number of goals scored; 5) goal difference.
(H) Hosts
Notes:

20 January 2020; 18:00	South Korea	27–34	Qatar	Shaikh Saad Al-Abdullah Sports Hall Complex, Kuwait City; Referees: Al-Mawt, Marhoon (BHR)
20 January 2020; 18:00	Park J., Park S. 5	(13–18)	Frankis, Sami 6	Shaikh Saad Al-Abdullah Sports Hall Complex, Kuwait City; Referees: Al-Mawt, Marhoon (BHR)
20 January 2020; 18:00	1× (yellow card) 1× (suspension)	Report	1× (yellow card) 7× (suspension)	Shaikh Saad Al-Abdullah Sports Hall Complex, Kuwait City; Referees: Al-Mawt, Marhoon (BHR)

20 January 2020; 20:00	Kuwait	24–28	Iran	Shaikh Saad Al-Abdullah Sports Hall Complex, Kuwait City
20 January 2020; 20:00		(13–13)		Shaikh Saad Al-Abdullah Sports Hall Complex, Kuwait City

21 January 2020; 18:00	Iran	25–31	Qatar	Shaikh Saad Al-Abdullah Sports Hall Complex, Kuwait City
21 January 2020; 18:00		(13–11)		Shaikh Saad Al-Abdullah Sports Hall Complex, Kuwait City

21 January 2020; 20:00	Kuwait	27–34	South Korea	Shaikh Saad Al-Abdullah Sports Hall Complex, Kuwait City; Referees: Lah, Sok (SLO)
21 January 2020; 20:00	Al-Baloul, M. Al-Gharaballi 5	(12–17)	Kim D. 7	Shaikh Saad Al-Abdullah Sports Hall Complex, Kuwait City; Referees: Lah, Sok (SLO)
21 January 2020; 20:00	1× (yellow card) 3× (suspension)	Report	2× (yellow card) 3× (suspension)	Shaikh Saad Al-Abdullah Sports Hall Complex, Kuwait City; Referees: Lah, Sok (SLO)

23 January 2020; 18:00	Iran	24–24	South Korea	Shaikh Saad Al-Abdullah Sports Hall Complex, Kuwait City; Referees: Lah, Sok (SLO)
23 January 2020; 18:00	Heidarpour 7	(14–11)	Ha 11	Shaikh Saad Al-Abdullah Sports Hall Complex, Kuwait City; Referees: Lah, Sok (SLO)
23 January 2020; 18:00	1× (yellow card) 4× (suspension) 1× (red card)	Report	1× (suspension)	Shaikh Saad Al-Abdullah Sports Hall Complex, Kuwait City; Referees: Lah, Sok (SLO)

23 January 2020; 20:00	Qatar	29–23	Kuwait	Shaikh Saad Al-Abdullah Sports Hall Complex, Kuwait City; Referees: Koo, Lee (KOR)
23 January 2020; 20:00		(13–14)		Shaikh Saad Al-Abdullah Sports Hall Complex, Kuwait City; Referees: Koo, Lee (KOR)

== Final round ==
=== Bracket ===
Semi-finals
25 January
Japan	32
South Korea (ET)	34
25 January
Qatar	28
Bahrain	24

Final
27 January
South Korea	21
Qatar	33
Third place
27 January
Japan	27
Bahrain	26

=== Semifinals ===
25 January 2020
18:00
Japan
32–34 (ET)
South Korea
Shaikh Saad Al-Abdullah Sports Hall Complex, Kuwait City
Referees: Kleven, Jørum (NOR)
Watanabe 6
(19–16)
Kim J. 9
2× (yellow card) 7× (suspension)
Report
1× (yellow card) 5× (suspension)

FT: 29–29 ET: 3–5

25 January 2020; 20:00	Qatar	28–24	Bahrain	Shaikh Saad Al-Abdullah Sports Hall Complex, Kuwait City
25 January 2020; 20:00		(14–11)		Shaikh Saad Al-Abdullah Sports Hall Complex, Kuwait City

=== Seventh place game ===
25 January 2020; 14:00	Saudi Arabia	24–19	Kuwait	Shaikh Saad Al-Abdullah Sports Hall Complex, Kuwait City
25 January 2020; 14:00		(12–7)		Shaikh Saad Al-Abdullah Sports Hall Complex, Kuwait City

=== Fifth place game ===
25 January 2020; 16:00	United Arab Emirates	29–26	Iran	Shaikh Saad Al-Abdullah Sports Hall Complex, Kuwait City
25 January 2020; 16:00		(13–14)		Shaikh Saad Al-Abdullah Sports Hall Complex, Kuwait City

=== Third place game ===
27 January 2020; 16:30	Japan	27–26	Bahrain	Shaikh Saad Al-Abdullah Sports Hall Complex, Kuwait City; Referees: Kleven, Jørum (NOR)
27 January 2020; 16:30		(14–15)		Shaikh Saad Al-Abdullah Sports Hall Complex, Kuwait City; Referees: Kleven, Jørum (NOR)

=== Final ===
27 January 2020; 18:30	South Korea	21–33	Qatar	Shaikh Saad Al-Abdullah Sports Hall Complex, Kuwait City; Referees: Kolahdouzan, Mousavian (IRI)
27 January 2020; 18:30	Park S. 5	(11–14)	Frankis 8	Shaikh Saad Al-Abdullah Sports Hall Complex, Kuwait City; Referees: Kolahdouzan, Mousavian (IRI)
27 January 2020; 18:30	1× (yellow card) 1× (suspension)	Report	1× (yellow card) 6× (suspension)	Shaikh Saad Al-Abdullah Sports Hall Complex, Kuwait City; Referees: Kolahdouzan, Mousavian (IRI)

== Final ranking ==
Rank	Team
1st place, gold medalist(s)	Qatar
2nd place, silver medalist(s)	South Korea
3rd place, bronze medalist(s)	Japan
4	Bahrain
5	United Arab Emirates
6	Iran
7	Saudi Arabia
8	Kuwait
9	Iraq
10	Hong Kong
11	China
12	Australia
13	New Zealand

Qualified for the 2021 World Championship

== Awards ==
The all-star team and MVP were announced on 30 January 2020.

Position	Player
Goalkeeper	Mohamed Ali (BHR)
Right wing	Saleh Ali (KUW)
Right back	Ha Tae-hyun (KOR)
Centre back	Ahmed Al-Maqabi (BHR)
Left back	Frankis Carol (QAT)
Left wing	Remi Anri Doi (JPN)
Pivot	Youssef Benali (QAT)
Most Valuable Player	Yuto Agarie (JPN)

== Top goalscorers ==
Rank	Name	Goals
1	(New Zealand) Luke Ireland	40
2	(Iraq) Hussein Ali Hussein	39
3	(Qatar) Frankis Carol	38
4	(China) Sun Fangwei	35
4	(China) Wang Xiaofeng	35
6	(South Korea) Kim Jin-young	33
7	(Australia) Timothy Anderson	32
7	(Australia) Caleb Gahan	32
9	(Japan) Tatsuki Yoshino	30
9	(Qatar) Rafael Capote	30

Source: AHF
