= Sasa Sestic =

Australian handball player and barista

Sasa Sestic (born 24 October 1978) is a Bosnian-Australian barista from Canberra, Australian Capital Territory who won the 2015 World Barista Championship.

== Australian champion barista ==
Sestic won the Australian Barista Championship run by the Australian Specialty Coffee Association in March 2015, at his seventh attempt.

Sestic pays attention to the freshness of his coffee beans. "I've looked at a calendar and seen when coffee will ripen in each country." "Seasonality is very important and we knew that the season would finish in Colombia from September to October." "Just like fruit and vegetables, when they're in season they taste great. It's the same thing with coffee."

== World Barista Championship ==
As Australian champion, Sestic won the right to compete in the 2015 World Barista Championship conducted by the Specialty Coffee Association of America in Seattle, United States.

Sestic was selected into the final six, then won the finals round of four espressos, four cappuccinos and four signature drinks judged by sensory and technical judges plus a head judge.

The specialty coffee presented by Sestic contained a dash of Shiraz Viognier unfermented must from Clonakilla winery near Canberra.

== Documentary film ==
The Coffee Man (2016), directed by Jeff Hann, was widely screened, and has been available on DVD.

== Commercial ==
Sestic founded Project Origin, a green bean trading company, and owns Ona Coffee outlets at 5 locations:

- The Cupping Room (University Avenue)
- Ona Fyshwick (Wollongong Street) including a wholesale bean outlet
- Highroad, Dickson
- Ona Sydney
- Ona Melbourne

== Sport ==
Sestic represented Australia in Men's competition for Handball at the 2000 Summer Olympics in Sydney. He is the brother of Dragan Sestic.
