= French Polynesia men's national handball team =

French Polynesia

Information
- Association: Federation Tahitienne de Handball

Colours
1st	2nd

Results

Summer Olympics
- Appearances: Not eligible

World Championship
- Appearances: Not eligible

Pacific Handball Cup
- Appearances: 1 (First in 2004)
- Best result: 3rd place, bronze medalist(s)
- Last updated on 6 January 2016.

The French Polynesia national handball team is the national handball team of French Polynesia.

== Pacific Handball Cup record ==
Year	Position
Sydney 2004	3rd
Total	1/2
