= 2014 Oceania Handball Championship =

Tournament details
- Host country: New Zealand
- Venue(s): 1 (in 1 host city)
- Dates: 25–26 April
- Teams: 2 (from 1 confederation)

Final positions
- Champions: Australia (8th title)
- Runners-up: New Zealand

Tournament statistics
- Matches played: 2
- Goals scored: 90 (45 per match)

The 2014 Oceania Handball Nations Cup was the ninth edition of the Oceania Handball Nations Cup, held from 25 to 26 April 2014 in Auckland, New Zealand. It acted originally as the qualifying competition for the 2015 World Men's Handball Championship, securing one vacancy for the World Championship. The spot was taken away by the IHF on 8 July 2014.

Australia and New Zealand played a two-game series to determine the winner.

== Overview ==
Team 1	Agg.	Team 2	1st leg	2nd leg
New Zealand	36–54	Australia	18–22	18–32

All times are local (UTC+12).

== Game 1 ==
25 April 2014; 17:00	New Zealand	18–22	Australia	ASB Stadium, Auckland; Referees: Ridley, Ridley (AUS)
25 April 2014; 17:00	Fitzpatrick 8	(8–15)	Kelly 5	ASB Stadium, Auckland; Referees: Ridley, Ridley (AUS)
25 April 2014; 17:00	3× (yellow card) 1× (suspension)	Report	3× (yellow card) 3× (suspension)	ASB Stadium, Auckland; Referees: Ridley, Ridley (AUS)

== Game 2 ==
26 April 2014; 17:00	New Zealand	18–32	Australia	ASB Stadium, Auckland
26 April 2014; 17:00		(7–19)		ASB Stadium, Auckland
