= Cook Islands men's national handball team =

Cook Islands

Information
- Association: Cook Islands Handball Association

Colours
| 1st | 2nd |

Results

Oceania Nations Cup
- Appearances: 5 (First in 2002)
- Best result: (bronze) (2002, 2004, 2006, 2010)
- Last updated on December 2011.

The Cook Islands national handball team is the national handball team of Cook Islands.

== Results ==
=== Oceania Nations Cup ===
| Year | Position |
|---|---|
| Australia 2002 | 3rd |
| Australia 2004 | 3rd |
| Australia 2006 | 3rd |
| New Zealand 2008 | 3rd |
| New Zealand 2010 | 3rd |
| Total | 5/9 |

=== Pacific Handball Cup ===
| Year | Position |
|---|---|
| Sydney 2004 | 5th |
| Sydney 2006 | 4th |
| Total | 2/2 |
