= Vanuatu men's national handball team =

Vanuatu

Information

Colours
1st	2nd

Results

Oceania Nations Cup
- Appearances: 1 (First in 2002)
- Best result: 2nd (2002)
- Last updated on 3 January 2016.

The Vanuatu national handball team is the national handball team of Vanuatu.

== Oceania Nations Cup record ==
Year	Position
Australia 2002	2nd
Total	1/9
