= Australia men's national handball team =

Australia

Information
- Nickname: Crocs
- Association: Australian Handball Federation
- Coach: Taip Ramadani
- Assistant coach: Tomasz Szklarski; Ognjen Latinović
- Captain: Timothy Anderson; Caleb Gahan
- Most caps: Darryl McCormack (71)
- Most goals: Darryl McCormack (269)

Colours
1st	2nd

Results

Summer Olympics
- Appearances: 1 (First in 2000)
- Best result: 12th (2000)

World Championship
- Appearances: 9 (First in 1999)
- Best result: 21st (2003)

Oceania Nations Cup
- Appearances: 9 (First in 1994)
- Best result: 1st (1994, 1996, 2002, 2004, 2006, 2010, 2012, 2014)
- Last updated on Unknown.

The Australia national handball team is the national handball team of Australia, representing the country in international matches. Handball Australia is the national governing body for the Olympic Sport of Handball and for the sport of Beach Handball. Australia has consistently won the Oceania championships in both men's and women's division. In 2014 the International Handball Federation (IHF) decided to exclude Australia from the 2015 World Men's Handball Championship.

== Tournament record ==
=== Olympic Games ===
Year	Position
Sydney 2000	12th
Total	1/14

=== World Championship ===
Year	Rank	M	W	D	L	GF	GA	GD
Egypt 1999	24th							
Portugal 2003	21st							
Tunisia 2005	24th							
Germany 2007	24th							
Croatia 2009	24th							
Sweden 2011	24th							
Spain 2013	24th							
Qatar 2015	Qualified did not attend							
Total	9/32	-	-	-	-	-	-	-

=== Oceania Nations Cup ===
Year	Position
Australia 1994	1st
New Zealand 1996	1st
Australia 2002	1st
Australia 2004	1st
Australia 2006	1st
New Zealand 2008	2nd
New Zealand 2010	1st
Australia 2012	1st
New Zealand 2014	1st
Total	9/9

=== Asian Championship ===
Year	Position
South Korea 2018	11th
Kuwait 2020	12th
Saudi Arabia 2022	16th
Bahrain 2024	Withdrew
Kuwait 2026	14th
Total	4/5

=== Pacific Cup ===
Year	Position
Sydney 2004	1st
Sydney 2006	1st
Total	2/2

=== IHF Emerging Nations Championship ===
Year	Position
Kosovo 2015	12th
Bulgaria 2023	6th
Total	2/4

== Kit suppliers ==
Kit supplier	Period
(Denmark) Hummel	1999–2011
(United States) Nike	Sydney 2000
(Spain) Joma	2013-2019
(Australia) AKU Teamwear	2020–present

== Team ==
=== Current squad ===
The following is the squad for the 2026 Asian Men's Handball Championship.

As of 1 April 2026

No.	Pos.	Player	Date of birth (Age)	Age	Caps	Goals	Club
1	GK	Daniel Reid	20 June 2003	22	11	0	(Australia) UQ HC
3	LW	Christopher Fallah	21 November 2003	22	11	9	(Germany) HRW Laupheim
5	RB	Harry Boyd	4 March 2005	20	5	0	(Australia) UNSW HC
6	PV	Matias Clowes	19 October 2006	19	7	22	(Norway) Asker SK
7	RB	Timothy Anderson	17 August 1991	34	53	179	(Germany) HRW Laupheim
8	LB	Caleb Gahan	2 August 1989	36	50	167	(United Kingdom) London GD
10	PV	Christopher Bajraktarević	14 January 1991	35	4	0	(Australia) Canberra HC
15	LB	Ryan Mayer	13 January 1997	29	6	0	(Australia) Canberra HC
16	GK	Bjørn McCourt	3 May 2000	25	11	0	(Norway) Oslo Studentenes
18	LW	Pavle Prokić	24 July 1999	26	24	25	(Australia) UQ HC
19	CB	Dexter McGowan	15 December 2007	18	7	14	(Sweden) Mölndals Handboll
21	GK	Avery Edmunds	21 July 1994	31	25	0	(Norway) Lillehammer FH09
22	CB	Otto Koehler	19 September 2005	20	6	7	(Australia) UQ HC
24	RW	Liam Hewitt	24 October 2003	22	7	9	(Australia) UTS HC
41	RW	Jack Neubecker	6 January 1998	28	7	8	(Australia) UQ HC
42	CB	James Yates	12 December 2000	25	6	12	(Australia) UTS HC
44	PV	Alix Verdier	27 December 1997	28	7	11	(Australia) UQ HC
47	CB	Lucas Velasquez	27 August 2005	20	4	0	(Australia) UNSW HC

=== Notable players ===
- Bevan Calvert
- Darryl McCormack
- Taip Ramadani
- Lee Schofield
- Ognjen Latinović
- Milan Slavujević
- Saša Šestić

=== Individual records ===
==== Coaches ====
No.	Name	Period
1.	(Poland) Eddie Grant	1984–1988
2.	(Poland) Jozef Pzyzbylo	1989–1993
3.	(Bosnia and Herzegovina) Nenad Maksimović	1994–1997
4.	(Hungary) Zoltan Marczinka	1998–2000
5.	(North Macedonia) Dragan Marinković	2000-2003
6.	(Australia) Karim Shehab	2004-2005
7.	(Norway) Morten Fjeldstad	2005-2009
8.	(Australia) Taip Ramadani	2009-2013
9.	(Denmark) Jan Ottosen	2013-2015
10.	(Croatia) Ante Jelićić → (United Arab Emirates) Mohamed Abdel Wahed	2016-2020; 2020
11.	(Australia) Taip Ramadani	2021-

==== Captains ====
No.	Name	Period
1.	Gerard Morrison	1987–1995
2.	Karim Shehab	1995–2000
3.	Jean Claude Ziade	1998-1999
4.	Darryl McCormack	2000-2007
5.	Lee Schofield	2007-2009
6.	Joshua Parmenter	2009-2011
7.	Bevan Calvert	2011-2015
8.	Tomasz Szklarski	2015-2022
9.	Timothy Anderson	2026-

==== Most matches played ====
As of 1 April 2026
Total number of international matches.

Rank	Player	Years	Matches	Goals
1	Darryl McCormack	1994 - 2007	71	269
2	Taip Ramadani	1994 - 2009	68	191
3	Lee Schofield	1996 - 2012	68	109
4	Timothy Anderson	2013 -	53	179
5	Bevan Calvert	2005 - 2015	52	166
6	Ognjen Latinović	2004 - 2014	50	6
6	Caleb Gahan	2013 -	50	167
8	Milan Slavujević	1995 - 2007	47	159
9	Saša Šestić	1998 - 2022	43	118
10	Tommy Fletcher	2009 - 2016	39	175

==== Most goals scored ====
As of 1 April 2026
Total number of international goals.

Rank	Player	Years	Goals	Matches
1	Darryl McCormack	1994 - 2007	269	71
2	Taip Ramadani	1994 - 2009	191	68
3	Timothy Anderson	2013 -	179	53
4	Tommy Fletcher	2009 - 2016	175	39
5	Caleb Gahan	2013 -	167	50
6	Bevan Calvert	2005 - 2015	166	52
7	Milan Slavujević	1995 - 2007	159	47
8	Tomasz Szklarski	2015 - 2022	122	29
9	Saša Šestić	1998 - 2022	118	43
10	Lee Schofield	1996 - 2012	109	68

== International matches ==
- List of Australian national handball team games

== Notes and references ==
=== Notes ===
1. Mohamed Abdel Wahed was named as stand-in coach for the 2020 Asian Men's Championship in Kuwait, following the withdrawal of Ante Jelićić
