= New Zealand men's national handball team =

New Zealand

Information
- Association: New Zealand Handball Federation
- Coach: Roland van der Tillar
- Captain: James Cochrane
- Most caps: James Cochrane (20)
- Most goals: Luke Ireland (66)

Colours
1st	2nd

Results

Oceania Nations Cup
- Appearances: 8 (First in 1994)
- Best result: 2nd (1994, 1996, 2004, 2006, 2010, 2012, 2014)
- Last updated on Unknown.

The New Zealand national handball team is the national handball team of New Zealand and is controlled by the New Zealand Handball Federation.

== Results ==
=== Oceania Nations Cup ===
Year	Position
Australia 1994	2nd
New Zealand 1996	2nd
Australia 2004	2nd
Australia 2006	2nd
New Zealand 2008	4th
New Zealand 2010	2nd
Australia 2012	2nd
New Zealand 2014	2nd
Total	8/9

=== Asian Championship ===
Year	Position	Pld	W	D	L	GF	GA	GD
South Korea 2018	14th of 14	6	0	0	6	107	233	-126
Kuwait 2020	13th of 13	6	0	0	6	148	252	-104
Bahrain 2024	15th of 16	7	1	0	6	144	267	-123
Total	3/4	19	1	0	18	399	752	-353

=== Pacific Cup ===
Year	Position
Australia 2004	4th
Australia 2006	3rd
Total	2/2

== Team ==
=== Current squad ===
Squad for the 2024 Asian Men's Handball Championship.

Head Coach: Roland van den Tillar

No.	Pos.	Name	Club
1	Goalkeeper	Alexanda Brown	Canterbury Quakes HC
2	Centre Back	Karl Fitzpatrick	Auckland HC
3	Left Wing	James Cochrane	Otago HC
4	Right Wing	Jun Burden	Auckland HC
6	Pivot	Leo Gatti	Otago HC
8	Right Back	Luke Ireland	Antibes Handball (FRA)
12	Goalkeeper	James Nixon	
14	Centre Back	Luke Naylor	HV Hellas (NED)
15	Left Wing	Willy Makea	UTS HC (AUS)
20	Left Back	Paul Ireland	Vikings HC
22	Right Wing	Matt Cropp	UTS HC (AUS)
24	Left Back	Aston Lang	Otago HC
27	Pivot	Cameron Ross	Purple Goannas HC
34	Pivot	Harry Ireland	Vikings HC
42	Left Back	Paul Pringot	Canterbury Quakes HC

=== Coaching/supporting staff ===
Role	Name
Head coach	Roland van den Tillar
Manager	David Ireland
Media Officer	Jun Tanlayco
