= Queensland women's state handball team =

Queensland

Information
- Association: Queensland Team Handball Association

Colours
1st	2nd

Results

Oceania Handball Nations Cup
- Appearances: 1 (First in 2009)
- Best result: 2nd
- Last updated on 3 January 2016.

The Queensland women's state handball team is the state handball team of Queensland which played in the 2009 Women's Oceania Handball Championship and finished runners-up to the Australian national team.

== Tournament results ==
=== Oceania Handball Nations Cup record ===
Year	Position
Brisbane 2009	2nd
Total	1/9

=== Australian National Handball Championship ===
Year	Position
Melbourne 2010	1st
Adelaide 2012	2nd
Melbourne 2013	1st
Brisbane 2014	1st
Perth 2015	2nd
Sydney 2016	2nd
Sydney 2017	1st
Sydney 2018	3rd
Sydney 2019	2nd
2020-21 No finals due to COVID-19
Melbourne 2022	1st
Melbourne 2023	1st
