= Jose Correa =

Jose Correa may refer to

- José Correa Quesney (1904–1996), Chilean agronomist and politician
- Jose Luis Correa (born 1958), U.S. businessman and politician, known as Lou Correa
- José Correa (boxer) (1980–2015), Puerto Rican boxer
- José Erick Correa (born 1992), Colombian footballer
- Ginásio José Corrêa, an indoor sporting arena located in Barueri, São Paulo, Brazil

== See also ==
- José Correia da Serra (1750–1823), Portuguese polymath, also cited as "Correa"
