= Daniela Borelli Dos Santos =

Australian handball player

Daniela Borelli dos Santos
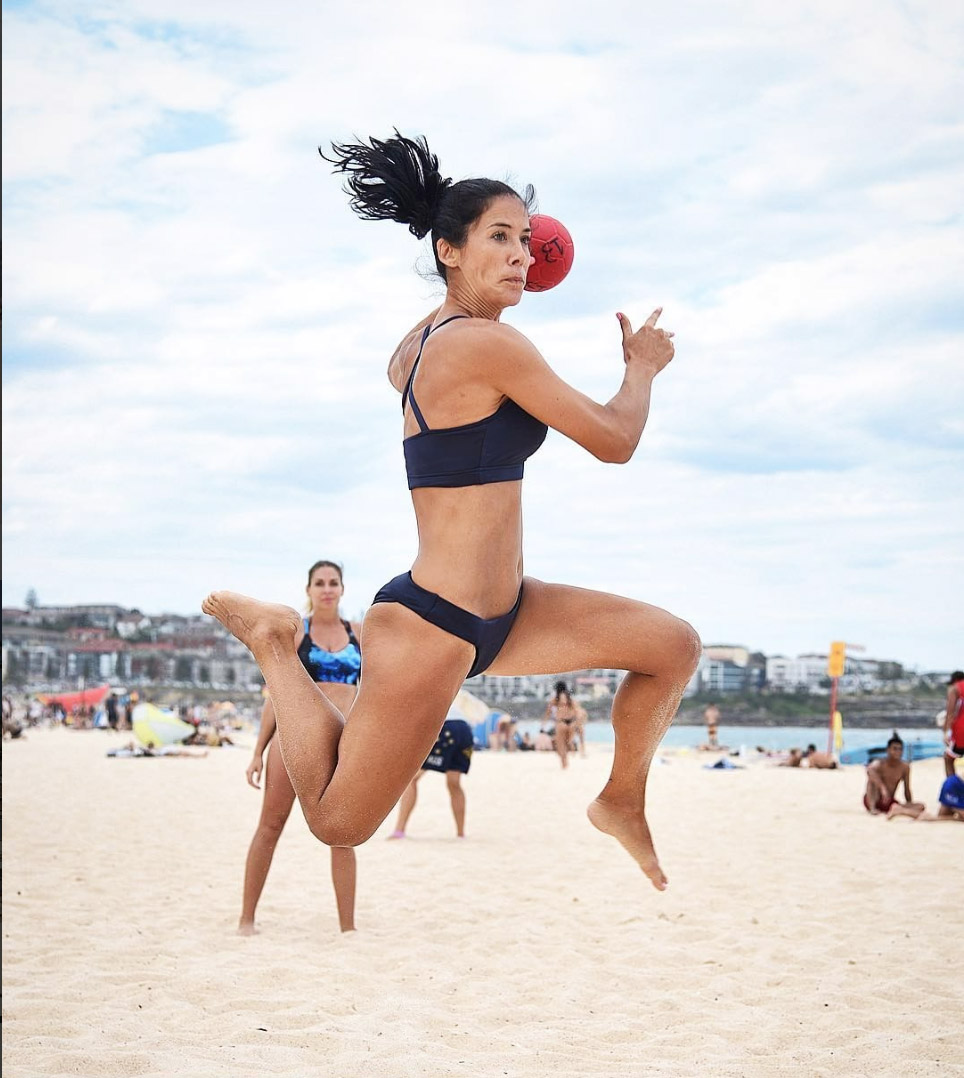

Personal information
- Full name: Daniela Borelli dos Santos
- Nationality: Australian
- Born: 16 March 1978 (age 48)
- Height: 1.76 m (5 ft 9 in)

Sport
- Sport: Handball
- Position: Right wing
- Current club: Maroubra Blue Bottles and Sydney University
National team
Years	Team	Apps	(Gls)
–	Australia	10	(30)

Daniela Borelli dos Santos (born 1978), also known as Daniela Cook, is an Australian team handball player. She part of the Australian national team, and participated at the 2011 World Women's Handball Championship in Hungary and Brazil.

== Indoor handball career ==
She was part of the New South Wales state team for the Australian National Handball Championship and contributed to obtaining a gold medal in 2005, 2006 and 2008.

== Beach handball career ==
She was part of one of New South Wales team that won the Australian Championship silver medal in 2010, 2015 and gold medal in 2011, 2014, 2016.

== Achievements ==
- 2015 : Australian Beach Handball Championships - All Star Team (Best Right Wing player)
- 2016 : Australian Beach Handball Championships - All Star Team (Best Right Wing player)
- 2017: Australian Beach Handball Championships - Most Valuable Player & Best Scorer

== International indoor handball career ==
She was selected and represented Australia at the 2011 World Women's Handball Championship in Brazil and the 2013 World Women's Handball Championship in Serbia, she also represented Australia for the Oceanian Qualifiers in 2016.

== International Beach Handball Career ==
She was selected to represent Australia for the World Championships 2018 in Russia. She was vice captain of the Australian team.

She also represented Australia for the following events:

- 2017 World Games (Beach Handball) - Poland
- 2014 Beach Handball World Championships - Brazil
- 2013 World Games (Beach Handball) - Colombia
- 2012 Beach Handball World Championships - Oman
