= Handball New Zealand =

Former governing body of handball in New Zealand

Handball New Zealand HNZ
- IOC nation: New Zealand
- Sport: Handball

HISTORY
- Year of formation: 1994; 32 years ago

AFFILIATIONS
- International federation: International Handball Federation (IHF)
- Continental association: Oceania Handball Federation (OHF)
- National Olympic Committee: New Zealand Olympic Committee
- Address: Wellington
- Country: New Zealand

Handball New Zealand (HNZ) was the governing body for the sport of handball in New Zealand, which was later in competition to the New Zealand Handball Federation (NZHF). The latter was a member of the Oceania Handball Federation (OHF) and the International Handball Federation (IHF).

== History ==
Handball New Zealand (HNZ) was founded in 1994. In 2005 a second federation, the New Zealand Handball Federation (NZHF), was founded. In 2006 the New Zealand Olympic Committee (NZOC) suspended the HNZ. Later on, the International Handball Federation (IHF) did the same. They suspended the HNZ because the HNZ was closely aligned with Vern Winitana, president of the Oceania Handball Federation (OHF). He was kicked off the IHF Council in 2009. One week later the IHF Congress recognised the NZHF. In 2010 the Sports Tribunal of New Zealand dismissed the lawsuit of the HNZ against the NZOC for the suspension.

== National teams ==
- New Zealand men's national handball team
- New Zealand women's national handball team
