= 2011 Women's Oceania Handball Championship =

Tournament details
- Host country: New Zealand
- Venue(s): 1 (in 1 host city)
- Dates: 28–29 May
- Teams: 2 (from 1 confederation)

Final positions
- Champions: Australia (5th title)
- Runner-up: New Zealand

Tournament statistics
- Matches played: 2
- Goals scored: 75 (37.5 per match)

The 2011 Women's Oceania Handball Championship was the fifth edition of the Oceania Handball Nations Cup, held on 28 and 29 May 2011 at Wellington, New Zealand.

Australia and New Zealand played in a two-legged game against each other, the aggregate winner qualified for the 2011 World Women's Handball Championship in Brazil.

== Overview ==
Team 1	Agg.	Team 2	1st leg	2nd leg
New Zealand	28–47	Australia	13–22	15–25

All times are local (UTC+13).

== Game 1 ==
28 May 2011; 17:00	New Zealand	13–22	Australia	Te Rauparaha Arena, Porirua; Referees: Arntsen, Gullaksen (NOR)
28 May 2011; 17:00	Odermatt 6	(5–11)	Potocki 8	Te Rauparaha Arena, Porirua; Referees: Arntsen, Gullaksen (NOR)
28 May 2011; 17:00		Report		Te Rauparaha Arena, Porirua; Referees: Arntsen, Gullaksen (NOR)

== Game 2 ==
29 May 2011; 17:00	Australia	25–15	New Zealand	Te Rauparaha Arena, Porirua; Referees: Arntsen, Gullaksen (NOR)
29 May 2011; 17:00	Potocki 6	(11–7)	Winitana 5	Te Rauparaha Arena, Porirua; Referees: Arntsen, Gullaksen (NOR)
29 May 2011; 17:00		Report		Te Rauparaha Arena, Porirua; Referees: Arntsen, Gullaksen (NOR)
