= Kamimachi =

Kamimachi (written: 上町) may refer to:

- Shiori Kamimachi (上町 史織) (born 1981), Japanese handball player
- Kamimachi Station (上町駅, Kamimachi-eki), train station in Segataya, Tokyo, Japan
