= Arena Santos =

Sporting venue in Brazil

Coordinates: 23°56′31.8″S 46°19′59.8″W

- Interactive map of Arena Santos
- Location: Santos, São Paulo, Brazil.
- Owner: City Government
- Operator: City Government
- Capacity: 5,000

Construction
- Opened: 27 October 2010

Arena Santos is an indoor sporting arena located in Santos in São Paulo, Brazil, used for table tennis. The seating capacity of the arena is 5,000 people, and it was opened on 27 October 2010.

Arena Santos was the location for some of the matches of the 2011 World Women's Handball Championship.
