= 1997 Women's Oceania Handball Championship =

Tournament details
- Host country: Australia
- Venue: 1 (in 1 host city)
- Dates: 22–23 March
- Teams: 2 (from 1 confederation)

Final positions
- Champions: Australia (1st title)
- Runners-up: New Zealand

Tournament statistics
- Matches played: 2
- Goals scored: 70 (35 per match)

The 1997 Oceania Women's Handball Championship was the first edition of the Oceania Handball Nations Cup, which took place in Melbourne, Australia from 22 to 23 March 1997. Entered nations were Australia, Vanuatu and New Zealand, but Vanuatu did not compete. Australia won the right to play Slovenia for a spot in the World Cup.

== Table ==
Team	Pld	W	D	L	GF	GA	GD	Pts
Australia (H)	2	2	0	0	48	22	+26	4
New Zealand	2	0	0	2	22	48	−26	0
Vanuatu	0	0	0	0	0	0	0	0

(H) Hosts

== Results ==
All times are local (UTC+10).

22 March 1997; 20:10	Australia	27–11	New Zealand
22 March 1997; 20:10		(14–5)

23 March 1997; 11:35	New Zealand	11–22	Australia
23 March 1997; 11:35		(9–11)
