= 2016 Women's Oceania Handball Championship =

Tournament details
- Host country: Australia
- Venue: 1 (in 1 host city)
- Dates: 5–6 October
- Teams: 2 (from 1 confederation)

Final positions
- Champions: Australia (7th title)
- Runners-up: New Zealand

Tournament statistics
- Matches played: 2
- Goals scored: 78 (39 per match)

The 2016 Women's Oceania Handball Championship was the seventh edition of the Oceania Handball Nations Cup, held on 5 and 6 October at Blacktown Leisure Centre, Stanhope Gardens, Sydney, Australia.

Australia and New Zealand played in a two-legged game against each other, the aggregate winner would be the Oceania Champion. Australia won the two-game series. The next step in the qualification process for the 2017 World Women's Handball Championship was the Asian Championships in Korea in March 2017.

== Results ==
Team 1	Agg.	Team 2	1st leg	2nd leg
Australia	57–21	New Zealand	26–12	31–9

All times are local (UTC+10).

== Game 1 ==
5 October 2016; 17:00	Australia	26–12	New Zealand	Blacktown Leisure Centre, Stanhope Gardens
5 October 2016; 17:00		(14–5)		Blacktown Leisure Centre, Stanhope Gardens

== Game 2 ==
6 October 2016; 12:30	Australia	31–9	New Zealand	Blacktown Leisure Centre, Stanhope Gardens
6 October 2016; 12:30		(15–4)		Blacktown Leisure Centre, Stanhope Gardens
