= 2013 Women's Oceania Handball Championship =

Tournament details
- Host country: New Zealand
- Venue(s): 1 (in 1 host city)
- Dates: 26–27 April
- Teams: 2 (from 1 confederation)

Final positions
- Champions: Australia (6th title)
- Runner-up: New Zealand

Tournament statistics
- Matches played: 2
- Goals scored: 85 (42.5 per match)

The 2013 Women's Oceania Handball Championship was the sixth edition of the Oceania Handball Nations Cup, held on 26 and 27 April 2013 at Wellington, New Zealand.

Australia and New Zealand played in a two-legged game against each other, the aggregate winner qualified for the 2013 World Women's Handball Championship in Serbia.

== Results ==
Team 1	Agg.	Team 2	1st leg	2nd leg
New Zealand	35–50	Australia	19–24	16–26

All times are local (UTC+13).

== Game 1 ==
26 April 2013; 17:30	New Zealand	19–24	Australia
26 April 2013; 17:30		(8–14)

== Game 2 ==
27 April 2013; 16:30	Australia	26–16	New Zealand
27 April 2013; 16:30		(13–7)
