= 2016 Australian National Handball Championship season =

The Australian National Handball Championship consists of four different tournaments across various age groups, including a Junior Section, Schools Tournament, and Australian University Games. In 2016, the Championship ran from 31 August until 9 October.

The Junior Section was the first tournament ever in the Championship. It ran from 29 July to 31 July, and was held at Runaway Bay on the Gold Coast in Queensland. Teams from New South Wales, Queensland, the Australian Capital Territory, and Wellington, New Zealand all took part in the tournament.

The Schools Tournament was the second tournament in the championship. It was held in Canberra and ran from 31 August to 2 September. This was the first Schools tournament held since the late 1980s. Turramurra High School won both the girls and boys tournament. Other schools competing included Narrabundah College, Canberra Combined Schools, and Cheltenham Secondary College. This tournament replaced the Youth Nationals.

The Australian University Games was the third tournament in the championship. It was held in Perth, Western Australia. Division One was won by Deakin University, beating the Queensland University of Technology. The University of Technology Sydney took the bronze medal. In Division Two, Griffith University beat the University of Canberra, with Flinders University taking the bronze medal.

The Senior Tournament was the fourth tournament in the championship. It was held in Sydney from the 6th to 9 October 2016. The winners of the men's section were South Australia, who defeated hosts New South Wales. Victoria won the women's section, defeating Queensland.

== Senior Indoor results ==
=== Men ===
==== Final ====
9 October 2016; 13:30	New South Wales	23–26	South Australia	Blacktown Leisure Centre, Stanhope Gardens

==== 3rd/4th play-off ====
9 October 2016; 10:30	Victoria	27–20	Western Australia	Blacktown Leisure Centre, Stanhope Gardens

==== 5th/6th play-off ====
9 October 2016; 09:00	Australian Capital Territory	26–23	Queensland	Blacktown Leisure Centre, Stanhope Gardens

=== Women ===
==== Final ====
9 October 2016; 12:00	Victoria	19–18	Queensland	Blacktown Leisure Centre, Stanhope Gardens

==== 3rd/4th play-off ====
9 October 2016; 09:00	New South Wales	23–28	South Australia	Blacktown Leisure Centre, Stanhope Gardens

==== 5th/6th play-off ====
9 October 2016; 10:30	Australian Capital Territory	12–20	New Zealand	Blacktown Leisure Centre, Stanhope Gardens

== Junior Indoor Results ==
=== Under 21 Men's ===
==== Final ====
31 July 2016; 4:00pm	Queensland	26–23	Wellington (NZ)	Runaway Bay Sports Super Centre

- Third placed team – New South Wales

=== Under 21 Women's ===
==== Final ====
31 July 2016	Queensland	17–8	Australian Capital Territory	Runaway Bay Sports Super Centre

- Third placed team – New South Wales

=== Under 18 Boys ===
31 July 2016	New South Wales	28–17	Wellington (NZ)	Runaway Bay Sports Super Centre

- Third placed team – Queensland

=== Under 18 Girls ===
31 July 2016	Wellington (NZ)	27–15	New South Wales	Runaway Bay Sports Super Centre

== Schools Championship ==
=== Boys ===
2 September 2016	Turramurra High School	25–13	Narrabundah College	Australian Institute of Sport, Canberra

=== Girls ===
2 September 2016	Turramurra High School	9–8	Narrabundah College	Australian Institute of Sport, Canberra

== University Games ==
=== Mixed Division 1 ===
==== Gold Medal playoff ====
30 September 2016	Deakin University	27–24	Queensland University of Technology	John XXIII College, Mount Claremont

==== Bronze Medal playoff ====
30 September 2016	University of Technology Sydney	41–31	University of Adelaide	John XXIII College, Mount Claremont

==== Final ranking ====
1st place, gold medalist(s)	Deakin University
2nd place, silver medalist(s)	Queensland University of Technology
3rd place, bronze medalist(s)	University of Technology Sydney
4	Australian College of Physical Education
5	University of Adelaide
6	Monash University
7	Sydney University
8	University of New South Wales

=== Mixed Division 2 ===
==== Gold Medal playoff ====
30 September 2016	Griffith University	37–28	University of Canberra	John XXIII College, Mount Claremont

==== Bronze Medal playoff ====
30 September 2016	Flinders University	26–22	University of Wollongong	John XXIII College, Mount Claremont

==== Final ranking ====
1st place, gold medalist(s)	Griffith University
2nd place, silver medalist(s)	University of Canberra
3rd place, bronze medalist(s)	Flinders University
4	University of Wollongong
5	Western Sydney University
6	University of Notre Dame Australia
7	University of Western Australia
