= 2007 Women's Oceania Handball Championship =

Tournament details
- Host country: Australia
- Venue: 1 (in 1 host city)
- Dates: 5–6 June
- Teams: 3 (from 1 confederation)

Final positions
- Champions: Australia (3rd title)
- Runners-up: (New Zealand) NZ Handball Federation
- Third place: Handball New Zealand

Tournament statistics
- Matches played: 4
- Goals scored: 166 (41.5 per match)
- Top scorer: (Australia) Katia Boyd (18)

The 2007 Oceania Handball Nations Cup was the third edition of the Oceania Handball Nations Cup, held from 5 to 6 June 2007, in Sydney, Australia. The winner qualified for the 2007 World Women's Handball Championship.

Australia and New Zealand played a four-game series to determine the winner. New Zealand played with two teams. This was a part of a Handball exhibition tournament at State Sports Centre, Sydney.

== Overview ==
Team	Pld	W	D	L	GF	GA	GD	Pts	Qualification
Australia (H)	4	4	0	0	112	54	+58	8	2007 World Championship
(New Zealand) NZ Handball Federation	2	0	0	2	25	49	−24	0	
Handball New Zealand	2	0	0	2	29	63	−34	0	

Source: Results
(H) Hosts

All times are local (UTC+10).

== Games ==
5 June 2007; 20:00	Australia	33–14	Handball New Zealand	State Sports Centre, Sydney; Referees: Tomaszewski, Adams
5 June 2007; 20:00	Petersen 8	(15–8)	Winitana 6	State Sports Centre, Sydney; Referees: Tomaszewski, Adams
5 June 2007; 20:00	3× (yellow card) 4× (suspension)	Report	3× (yellow card) 2× (suspension)	State Sports Centre, Sydney; Referees: Tomaszewski, Adams

6 June 2007; 20:00	Handball New Zealand	15–30	Australia	State Sports Centre, Sydney; Referees: Tomaszewski, Adams
6 June 2007; 20:00	Randall & Winitana 5	(9–11)	Boyd 6	State Sports Centre, Sydney; Referees: Tomaszewski, Adams
6 June 2007; 20:00	3× (yellow card) 2× (suspension) 2× (red card)	Report	3× (yellow card) 6× (suspension)	State Sports Centre, Sydney; Referees: Tomaszewski, Adams

8 June 2007; 20:00	Australia	27–11	(New Zealand) NZ Handball Federation	State Sports Centre, Sydney; Referees: Tomaszewski, Adams
8 June 2007; 20:00	Mather& Thomas 6	(17–4)	Odermatt & Fenwick Grangård 4	State Sports Centre, Sydney; Referees: Tomaszewski, Adams
8 June 2007; 20:00	3× (yellow card) 5× (suspension)	Report	3× (yellow card) 1× (suspension)	State Sports Centre, Sydney; Referees: Tomaszewski, Adams

9 June 2007; 20:00	NZ Handball Federation (New Zealand)	14–22	Australia	State Sports Centre, Sydney; Referees: Tomaszewski, Adams
9 June 2007; 20:00	Odermatt 8	(6–8)	Boyd 6	State Sports Centre, Sydney; Referees: Tomaszewski, Adams
9 June 2007; 20:00	3× (yellow card) 2× (suspension)	Report	3× (yellow card) 9× (suspension)	State Sports Centre, Sydney; Referees: Tomaszewski, Adams
