= 2005 Women's Oceania Handball Championship =

Tournament details
- Host country: Australia
- Venue: 1 (in 1 host city)
- Dates: 24–28 May
- Teams: 2 (from 1 confederation)

Final positions
- Champions: Australia (2nd title)
- Runners-up: New Zealand

Tournament statistics
- Matches played: 2
- Goals scored: 98 (49 per match)

The 2005 Oceania Handball Nations Cup was the second edition of the Oceania Handball Nations Cup, held from 24–28 May in Sydney, Australia. The winner qualified for the 2005 World Women's Handball Championship.

Australia and New Zealand played a two-game series to determine the winner.

== Overview ==
Team 1	Agg.	Team 2	1st leg	2nd leg
Australia	69–29	New Zealand	38–12	31–17

All times are local (UTC+10).

== Game 1 ==
24 May 2005; 20:00	Australia	38–12	New Zealand
24 May 2005; 20:00		(16–5)

== Game 2 ==
27 May 2005	New Zealand	17–31	Australia
27 May 2005		(12–17)
