= Lan Chunlei =

Chinese handball player (born 1989)

Personal information
- Nationality: Chinese
- Born: 1989 (age 36–37)
- Height: 177 cm (70 in)

Sport
- Sport: Handball
- Position: Right back
National team
- Years: Team
- –: China

Lan Chunlei (born 1989) is a Chinese team handball player. She plays on the Chinese national team, and participated at the 2011 World Women's Handball Championship in Brazil.
