= New Zealand women's national handball team =

New Zealand

Information
- Association: Handball New Zealand (HNZ) (1994-2009); New Zealand Handball Federation (NZHF) (2007-)
- Coach: Cyprien Pesques; Ezer Hendleson

Colours
1st	2nd

Results

Oceania Cup
- Appearances: 7 (First in 1997)
- Best result: 2nd (1997, 2005, 2007, 2011, 2013, 2016)
- Last updated on Unknown.

The New Zealand Women's National Handball team is the national handball team of New Zealand and is controlled by the New Zealand Handball Federation.

== History ==
The Handball New Zealand (HNZ) was founded in 1994. In 2005 a second federation the New Zealand Handball Federation (NZHF) was found. Both federations had teams at the Oceania Nations Cup 2007 and 2009. In 2006 the New Zealand Olympic Committee (NZOC) suspended the HNZ. Later by the International Handball Federation (IHF). They suspended the HNZ because the HNZ was closely aligned with Vern Winitana president of the Oceania Handball Federation (OHF). He was kicked off the IHF Council in 2009. One week later the IHF Congress recognized the NZHF. In 2010 the Sports Tribunal of New Zealand dismissed the lawsuit of the HNZ against the NZOC for the suspension.

== Results ==
=== Oceania Nations Cup ===
Year	HNZ	NZHF
(Australia) 1997 Melbourne	2nd	
(Australia) 2005 Sydney	2nd	
(Australia) 2007 Sydney	3rd	2nd
(Australia) 2009 Brisbane	4th	3rd
(New Zealand) 2011 Wellington		2nd
(New Zealand) 2013 Wellington		2nd
(Australia) 2016 Sydney		2nd
Total	4/7	5/7

=== Asian Championship ===
Year	Round	Position	GP	W	D	L	GS	GA	GD
(Japan) 2018	Ninth place game	10th	6	0	0	6	68	178	-110
Total	1/1	0 Titles	6	0	0	6	68	178	-110

=== Pacific Cup ===
Year	Position
Sydney 2005	4th
Auckland 2007	2nd
Total	2/2

== Current squad ==
The Team for the 2026 Oceania Trophy in Wellington, New Zealand.

- Rowan Moloughney (Captain)
- Kianna Dawson (Co-captain)
- Florence Gachet
- Jillian James
- Taylor Noble
- Bridget Ireland
- Cassandra Dawson
- Sarah Matthews
- Annalise Wilson
- Lucy Mayers
- Esther Cocker
- Mia Page
- Kristina Hames
- Eva Woodhouse
- Anika Franklin
- Louise Pringot

=== 2018 ===
The team for the 2018 Asian Women's Handball Championship in Japan.

Name	Position
Hannah Chapman	Wing
Daniela Conforte Vasconcellos	Centre/Back
Josephine Dixon	Pivot
Francesca Graham	Back
Madeleine Hazelton	Centre/Wing
Alexandra Mair	Wing
Rowan Moloughney	Pivot
Christine Mulitalo	Goalkeeper
Jaclyn Parker	Back (Captain)
Erin Roxburgh	Wing
Madeleine Stephen	Pivot
Jordan Thorstensen	Wing/Goalkeeper
Te Rangi Winitana	Wing/Back
Tahndae Wyatt	Goalkeeper
Ben Birkenhake	Head coach
Eoin Murray	Coach
Daniel Triebsch	Assistant coach
Stefan Jendersie	Goalkeeper coach
Lynda Hagen	Manager
