= 2011 World Women's Handball Championship =

2011 edition of the World Women's Handball Championship

XX Mundial Feminino de Handebol Brasil 2011

Tournament details
- Host country: Brazil
- Venues: 4 (in 4 host cities)
- Dates: 2–18 December
- Teams: 24 (from 5 confederations)

Final positions
- Champions: Norway (2nd title)
- Runners-up: France
- Third place: Spain
- Fourth place: Denmark

Tournament statistics
- Matches played: 88
- Goals scored: 4,643 (52.76 per match)
- Attendance: 65,750 (747 per match)
- Top scorer: (Brazil) Alexandra do Nascimento (57 goals)

The 2011 World Women's Handball Championship was the 20th edition of the international championship tournament in women's Team sport handball that is governed by the International Handball Federation (IHF). Brazil hosted the event from 2–18 December 2011.

On 18 December 2011, Norway successfully contested France 32–24 in the final. Norway was the second team to achieve a triple title cache all in the same tournament by winning the World Championship, European Championship and Olympic Games titles. Denmark had made this achievement previously. France lost, its second consecutive World Championship final (2009), to Russia.

Norway automatically qualified for the 2012 Olympic Handball tournament and 2013 World Championship. When Norway vacated their European Championship and that tournament's second place team, Sweden, automatically qualifying for the Olympics.

Spain successfully contested Denmark 24–18 in the final for the bronze and won their inaugural tournament medal. For fifth place, host nation Brazil achieved their best place at any previous tournament successfully knocking out the 2009 defending champions, Russia, 36–20.

== Venues ==
The competition took place in the Brazilian state of São Paulo. It is the third women's World Championship organized outside of Europe, after South Korea in 1990 and China in 2009.

Initially, the matches had to take place in the state of Santa Catarina.

Four cities had been selected to host the matches:

City	Stadium	Capacity	Matches
São Paulo	Ginásio do Ibirapuera	11,000	Group C, Round of 16, President's Cup, Final Round
São Bernardo do Campo	Ginásio Adib Moyses Dib	7,000	Group D, Round of 16, President's Cup
Santos	Arena Santos	5,000	Group A, Round of 16
Barueri	Ginásio José Corrêa	5,000	Group B, Round of 16

== Qualification ==
Host nation

- Brazil

Defending champions

- Russia

Qualified from the 2010 African Championship

- Angola
- Ivory Coast
- Tunisia

Qualified from the 2010 European Championship

- Norway
- Sweden
- Romania

Qualified from the 2010 Asian Championship

- China
- Japan
- Kazakhstan
- South Korea

Qualified from the 2011 American Championship

- Argentina
- Cuba
- Uruguay

Qualified from the 2011 Oceania Championship

- Australia

Qualified from European play-offs

- Croatia
- Denmark
- France
- Germany
- Iceland
- Montenegro
- Netherlands
- Spain

Eight European teams qualified for the World Championships through play-offs. The draw was made on 19 December. The first match leg were played on 4–5 June with the second legs on 11–12 June.

Team 1	Agg.	Team 2	1st leg	2nd leg
Czech Republic	52–75	Montenegro	26–42	26–33
Netherlands	78–62	Turkey	40–28	38–34
Spain	58–46	Macedonia	37–22	21–24
France	56–39	Slovenia	28–19	28–20
Croatia	66–56	Serbia	36–25	30–31
Iceland	61–42	Ukraine	37–18	24–24
Germany	53–46	Hungary	26–24	27–22
Poland	35–47	Denmark	16–23	19–24

== Group draw ==
The draw was held on 2 July 2011 at 21:00 local time.

=== Seeding ===
The seeding was announced on 24 June.

Pot 1	Pot 2	Pot 3	Pot 4	Pot 5	Pot 6
Russia (TH); Norway; Sweden; Romania	Denmark; Kazakhstan; France; Montenegro	Netherlands; Croatia; Brazil (Host); Angola	South Korea; Germany; Tunisia; Argentina	China; Spain; Ivory Coast; Cuba	Japan; Iceland; Uruguay; Australia

- TH = Title Holder

== Group stage ==
A provisional scheduled was released on 24 June. Brazil played the opening game on 2 December. On 7 July the venues for each preliminary round were announced by the IHF. The detailed match schedule was released on 31 August. As all Handball world championships, the tie-breakers in case of point tie betwin two or more teams were: 1.Points in matches between tied teams 2. Goal difference in matches between tied teams 3. Goaldifference in all group matches 4. Most scored goals in all group matches, 5. Draw.

All times are local (UTC−2).

=== Group A ===
Angola won the tie-break for second place due to a better record in matches between them, Montenegro and Iceland. In those direct encounters all three got 2 points but Angola's +2 goal difference beat Montenegro's +1 and Iceland's –3.

Pos	Team	Pld	W	D	L	GF	GA	GD	Pts	Qualification
1	Norway	5	4	0	1	152	108	+44	8	Round of 16
2	Angola	5	3	0	2	129	129	0	6	Round of 16
3	Montenegro	5	3	0	2	143	115	+28	6	Round of 16
4	Iceland	5	3	0	2	109	112	−3	6	Round of 16
5	Germany	5	2	0	3	120	126	−6	4	
6	China	5	0	0	5	98	161	−63	0	

3 December 2011; 15:00	Montenegro	21 – 22	Iceland	Arena Santos, Santos; Attendance: 1,200; Referees: Menezes, Pinto (BRA)
3 December 2011; 15:00	Popović, Bulatović 6	(10–11)	Knútsdóttir 6	Arena Santos, Santos; Attendance: 1,200; Referees: Menezes, Pinto (BRA)
3 December 2011; 15:00	3× (yellow card) 6× (suspension)	Report	4× (yellow card) 1× (suspension) 1× (red card)	Arena Santos, Santos; Attendance: 1,200; Referees: Menezes, Pinto (BRA)

3 December 2011; 17:15	Norway	28 – 31	Germany	Arena Santos, Santos; Attendance: 1,200; Referees: Gubica, Milošević (CRO)
3 December 2011; 17:15	Sulland 6	(14–13)	Mietzner 8	Arena Santos, Santos; Attendance: 1,200; Referees: Gubica, Milošević (CRO)
3 December 2011; 17:15	1× (yellow card)	Report	3× (yellow card) 2× (suspension)	Arena Santos, Santos; Attendance: 1,200; Referees: Gubica, Milošević (CRO)

3 December 2011; 19:30	Angola	30 – 29	China	Arena Santos, Santos; Attendance: 200; Referees: Kliko, Johansson (SWE)
3 December 2011; 19:30	four players 5	(10–12)	Zhao Jiaqin 6	Arena Santos, Santos; Attendance: 200; Referees: Kliko, Johansson (SWE)
3 December 2011; 19:30	2× (yellow card) 2× (suspension)	Report	3× (yellow card) 3× (suspension)	Arena Santos, Santos; Attendance: 200; Referees: Kliko, Johansson (SWE)

4 December 2011; 14:30	Germany	24 – 25	Montenegro	Arena Santos, Santos; Attendance: 400; Referees: Kliko, Johansson (SWE)
4 December 2011; 14:30	Mietzner 8	(10–12)	Bulatović 8	Arena Santos, Santos; Attendance: 400; Referees: Kliko, Johansson (SWE)
4 December 2011; 14:30	3× (yellow card) 3× (suspension)	Report	3× (yellow card) 2× (suspension)	Arena Santos, Santos; Attendance: 400; Referees: Kliko, Johansson (SWE)

4 December 2011; 17:15	China	16 – 43	Norway	Arena Santos, Santos; Attendance: 1,000; Referees: Bonaventura, Bonaventura (FRA)
4 December 2011; 17:15	Lan Chunlei 7	(7–20)	Løke 7	Arena Santos, Santos; Attendance: 1,000; Referees: Bonaventura, Bonaventura (FRA)
4 December 2011; 17:15	3× (yellow card) 5× (suspension)	Report	3× (yellow card)	Arena Santos, Santos; Attendance: 1,000; Referees: Bonaventura, Bonaventura (FRA)

4 December 2011; 19:30	Iceland	24 – 28	Angola	Arena Santos, Santos; Attendance: 450; Referees: Gubica, Milošević (CRO)
4 December 2011; 19:30	Sigurðardóttir 7	(12–15)	M. Kiala 6	Arena Santos, Santos; Attendance: 450; Referees: Gubica, Milošević (CRO)
4 December 2011; 19:30	3× (yellow card) 3× (suspension)	Report	2× (yellow card) 4× (suspension)	Arena Santos, Santos; Attendance: 450; Referees: Gubica, Milošević (CRO)

6 December 2011; 15:00	Montenegro	28 – 26	Angola	Arena Santos, Santos; Attendance: 350; Referees: Bonaventura, Bonaventura (FRA)
6 December 2011; 15:00	Popović 6	(14–13)	M. Kiala 7	Arena Santos, Santos; Attendance: 350; Referees: Bonaventura, Bonaventura (FRA)
6 December 2011; 15:00	3× (yellow card) 2× (suspension)	Report	2× (yellow card) 3× (suspension)	Arena Santos, Santos; Attendance: 350; Referees: Bonaventura, Bonaventura (FRA)

6 December 2011; 17:15	Norway	27 – 14	Iceland	Arena Santos, Santos; Attendance: 700; Referees: Kliko, Johansson (SWE)
6 December 2011; 17:15	Sulland 6	(14–7)	Sigurðardóttir 5	Arena Santos, Santos; Attendance: 700; Referees: Kliko, Johansson (SWE)
6 December 2011; 17:15	3× (yellow card) 4× (suspension)	Report	3× (yellow card) 5× (suspension)	Arena Santos, Santos; Attendance: 700; Referees: Kliko, Johansson (SWE)

6 December 2011; 19:30	Germany	23 – 22	China	Arena Santos, Santos; Attendance: 400; Referees: Menezes, Pinto (BRA)
6 December 2011; 19:30	Mietzner, Langkeit 4	(7–12)	Li Yao 5	Arena Santos, Santos; Attendance: 400; Referees: Menezes, Pinto (BRA)
6 December 2011; 19:30	3× (yellow card) 6× (suspension)	Report	3× (yellow card) 5× (suspension)	Arena Santos, Santos; Attendance: 400; Referees: Menezes, Pinto (BRA)

7 December 2011; 15:00	Montenegro	42 – 15	China	Arena Santos, Santos; Attendance: 200; Referees: Gubica, Milošević (CRO)
7 December 2011; 15:00	Radičević 9	(19–7)	Chunlei 4	Arena Santos, Santos; Attendance: 200; Referees: Gubica, Milošević (CRO)
7 December 2011; 15:00	3× (yellow card) 2× (suspension)	Report	3× (yellow card) 4× (suspension)	Arena Santos, Santos; Attendance: 200; Referees: Gubica, Milošević (CRO)

7 December 2011; 17:15	Angola	20 – 26	Norway	Arena Santos, Santos; Attendance: 800; Referees: Menezes, Pinto (BRA)
7 December 2011; 17:15	M. Kiala 7	(10–16)	Sulland 10	Arena Santos, Santos; Attendance: 800; Referees: Menezes, Pinto (BRA)
7 December 2011; 17:15	3× (yellow card) 5× (suspension) 2× (red card)	Report	3× (yellow card) 6× (suspension)	Arena Santos, Santos; Attendance: 800; Referees: Menezes, Pinto (BRA)

7 December 2011; 19:30	Iceland	26 – 20	Germany	Arena Santos, Santos; Attendance: 500; Referees: Bonaventura, Bonaventura (FRA)
7 December 2011; 19:30	Knútsdóttir 9	(13–12)	Mietzner 8	Arena Santos, Santos; Attendance: 500; Referees: Bonaventura, Bonaventura (FRA)
7 December 2011; 19:30	3× (yellow card) 5× (suspension)	Report	3× (yellow card) 5× (suspension)	Arena Santos, Santos; Attendance: 500; Referees: Bonaventura, Bonaventura (FRA)

9 December 2011; 15:00	Angola	25 – 22	Germany	Arena Santos, Santos; Attendance: 400; Referees: Gubica, Milošević (CRO)
9 December 2011; 15:00	L. Kiala 8	(14–10)	Mellbeck 7	Arena Santos, Santos; Attendance: 400; Referees: Gubica, Milošević (CRO)
9 December 2011; 15:00	2× (yellow card) 3× (suspension)	Report	2× (yellow card) 6× (suspension)	Arena Santos, Santos; Attendance: 400; Referees: Gubica, Milošević (CRO)

9 December 2011; 17:15	Norway	28 – 27	Montenegro	Arena Santos, Santos; Attendance: 800; Referees: Bonaventura, Bonaventura (FRA)
9 December 2011; 17:15	Sulland 9	(15–11)	Popović, Bulatović 7	Arena Santos, Santos; Attendance: 800; Referees: Bonaventura, Bonaventura (FRA)
9 December 2011; 17:15	3× (yellow card) 4× (suspension)	Report	3× (yellow card) 10× (suspension)	Arena Santos, Santos; Attendance: 800; Referees: Bonaventura, Bonaventura (FRA)

9 December 2011; 19:30	China	16 – 23	Iceland	Arena Santos, Santos; Referees: Kliko, Johansson (SWE)
9 December 2011; 19:30	Wu Yin 5	(9–12)	Skúladóttir 8	Arena Santos, Santos; Referees: Kliko, Johansson (SWE)
9 December 2011; 19:30	4× (yellow card) 5× (suspension)	Report	4× (yellow card) 6× (suspension)	Arena Santos, Santos; Referees: Kliko, Johansson (SWE)

=== Group B ===
Pos	Team	Pld	W	D	L	GF	GA	GD	Pts	Qualification
1	Russia	5	5	0	0	181	99	+82	10	Round of 16
2	Spain	5	4	0	1	151	108	+43	8	Round of 16
3	South Korea	5	3	0	2	164	124	+40	6	Round of 16
4	Netherlands	5	2	0	3	164	142	+22	4	Round of 16
5	Kazakhstan	5	1	0	4	113	133	−20	2	
6	Australia	5	0	0	5	52	219	−167	0	

3 December 2011; 15:45	Kazakhstan	37 – 9	Australia	Ginásio José Corrêa, Barueri; Attendance: 200; Referees: Abid, Chaouch (TUN)
3 December 2011; 15:45	Volnukhina 7	(20–6)	Hudson-Gofers 3	Ginásio José Corrêa, Barueri; Attendance: 200; Referees: Abid, Chaouch (TUN)
3 December 2011; 15:45	3× (yellow card) 4× (suspension)	Report	3× (yellow card) 4× (suspension)	Ginásio José Corrêa, Barueri; Attendance: 200; Referees: Abid, Chaouch (TUN)

3 December 2011; 18:00	Russia	39 – 24	South Korea	Ginásio José Corrêa, Barueri; Attendance: 300; Referees: Gjeding, Hansen (DEN)
3 December 2011; 18:00	Bliznova, Khmyrova 6	(19–13)	Woo Sun-Hee 7	Ginásio José Corrêa, Barueri; Attendance: 300; Referees: Gjeding, Hansen (DEN)
3 December 2011; 18:00	3× (yellow card) 4× (suspension)	Report	2× (yellow card) 2× (suspension)	Ginásio José Corrêa, Barueri; Attendance: 300; Referees: Gjeding, Hansen (DEN)

3 December 2011; 20:15	Netherlands	27 – 34	Spain	Ginásio José Corrêa, Barueri; Attendance: 300; Referees: Coulibaly, Diabate (CIV)
3 December 2011; 20:15	van der Wissel 6	(15–18)	three players 6	Ginásio José Corrêa, Barueri; Attendance: 300; Referees: Coulibaly, Diabate (CIV)
3 December 2011; 20:15	3× (yellow card) 6× (suspension)	Report	3× (yellow card) 5× (suspension)	Ginásio José Corrêa, Barueri; Attendance: 300; Referees: Coulibaly, Diabate (CIV)

4 December 2011; 15:45	South Korea	31 – 19	Kazakhstan	Ginásio José Corrêa, Barueri; Attendance: 300; Referees: Coulibaly, Diabate (CIV)
4 December 2011; 15:45	three players 4	(16–4)	Nedopekina 5	Ginásio José Corrêa, Barueri; Attendance: 300; Referees: Coulibaly, Diabate (CIV)
4 December 2011; 15:45	2× (yellow card) 2× (suspension)	Report	2× (yellow card) 2× (suspension)	Ginásio José Corrêa, Barueri; Attendance: 300; Referees: Coulibaly, Diabate (CIV)

4 December 2011; 18:00	Spain	22 – 28	Russia	Ginásio José Corrêa, Barueri; Attendance: 300; Referees: Marina, Minore (ARG)
4 December 2011; 18:00	Martín 5	(9–14)	Levina 7	Ginásio José Corrêa, Barueri; Attendance: 300; Referees: Marina, Minore (ARG)
4 December 2011; 18:00	4× (yellow card) 5× (suspension)	Report	2× (yellow card) 5× (suspension)	Ginásio José Corrêa, Barueri; Attendance: 300; Referees: Marina, Minore (ARG)

4 December 2011; 20:15	Australia	15 – 53	Netherlands	Ginásio José Corrêa, Barueri; Attendance: 300; Referees: Gjeding, Hansen (DEN)
4 December 2011; 20:15	Fletcher 4	(6–27)	Polman 11	Ginásio José Corrêa, Barueri; Attendance: 300; Referees: Gjeding, Hansen (DEN)
4 December 2011; 20:15	2× (yellow card) 4× (suspension) 1× (red card)	Report	2× (yellow card) 2× (suspension)	Ginásio José Corrêa, Barueri; Attendance: 300; Referees: Gjeding, Hansen (DEN)

6 December 2011; 15:45	Russia	45 – 8	Australia	Ginásio José Corrêa, Barueri; Attendance: 500; Referees: Coulibaly, Diabate (CIV)
6 December 2011; 15:45	Bliznova 8	(21–4)	Cook 2	Ginásio José Corrêa, Barueri; Attendance: 500; Referees: Coulibaly, Diabate (CIV)
6 December 2011; 15:45	3× (yellow card) 2× (suspension)	Report	2× (yellow card) 2× (suspension)	Ginásio José Corrêa, Barueri; Attendance: 500; Referees: Coulibaly, Diabate (CIV)

6 December 2011; 18:00	Kazakhstan	20 – 32	Netherlands	Ginásio José Corrêa, Barueri; Attendance: 200; Referees: Marina, Minore (ARG)
6 December 2011; 18:00	Baranovskaya 6	(8–18)	Abbingh 7	Ginásio José Corrêa, Barueri; Attendance: 200; Referees: Marina, Minore (ARG)
6 December 2011; 18:00	4× (yellow card) 6× (suspension) 1× (red card)	Report	3× (yellow card) 5× (suspension)	Ginásio José Corrêa, Barueri; Attendance: 200; Referees: Marina, Minore (ARG)

6 December 2011; 20:15	South Korea	26 – 29	Spain	Ginásio José Corrêa, Barueri; Attendance: 200; Referees: Gjeding, Hansen (DEN)
6 December 2011; 20:15	Choi Im-Jeong 8	(12–13)	Mangué 6	Ginásio José Corrêa, Barueri; Attendance: 200; Referees: Gjeding, Hansen (DEN)
6 December 2011; 20:15	1× (yellow card) 2× (suspension)	Report	3× (yellow card) 4× (suspension)	Ginásio José Corrêa, Barueri; Attendance: 200; Referees: Gjeding, Hansen (DEN)

7 December 2011; 15:45	Netherlands	26 – 35	Russia	Ginásio José Corrêa, Barueri; Attendance: 400; Referees: Gjeding, Hansen (DEN)
7 December 2011; 15:45	van der Wissel 7	(10–18)	Bodnieva 7	Ginásio José Corrêa, Barueri; Attendance: 400; Referees: Gjeding, Hansen (DEN)
7 December 2011; 15:45	2× (yellow card) 6× (suspension)	Report	3× (yellow card) 3× (suspension)	Ginásio José Corrêa, Barueri; Attendance: 400; Referees: Gjeding, Hansen (DEN)

7 December 2011; 18:00	Kazakhstan	18 – 27	Spain	Ginásio José Corrêa, Barueri; Attendance: 450; Referees: Coulibaly, Diabate (CIV)
7 December 2011; 18:00	Volnukhina 6	(8–11)	Alonso 6	Ginásio José Corrêa, Barueri; Attendance: 450; Referees: Coulibaly, Diabate (CIV)
7 December 2011; 18:00	1× (yellow card) 5× (suspension)	Report	3× (yellow card) 1× (suspension)	Ginásio José Corrêa, Barueri; Attendance: 450; Referees: Coulibaly, Diabate (CIV)

7 December 2011; 20:15	Australia	11 – 45	South Korea	Ginásio José Corrêa, Barueri; Attendance: 200; Referees: Abid, Chaouch (TUN)
7 December 2011; 20:15	Cook 5	(3–24)	Yoon Hyun-Kyung 7	Ginásio José Corrêa, Barueri; Attendance: 200; Referees: Abid, Chaouch (TUN)
7 December 2011; 20:15	3× (yellow card) 4× (suspension)	Report	3× (yellow card) 1× (suspension)	Ginásio José Corrêa, Barueri; Attendance: 200; Referees: Abid, Chaouch (TUN)

9 December 2011; 15:45	Spain	39 – 9	Australia	Ginásio José Corrêa, Barueri; Attendance: 300; Referees: Coulibaly, Diabate (CIV)
9 December 2011; 15:45	Alonso 7	(18–5)	three players 3	Ginásio José Corrêa, Barueri; Attendance: 300; Referees: Coulibaly, Diabate (CIV)
9 December 2011; 15:45	3× (yellow card)	Report	2× (yellow card) 5× (suspension)	Ginásio José Corrêa, Barueri; Attendance: 300; Referees: Coulibaly, Diabate (CIV)

9 December 2011; 18:00	Netherlands	26 – 38	South Korea	Ginásio José Corrêa, Barueri; Attendance: 300; Referees: Marina, Minore (ARG)
9 December 2011; 18:00	Abbingh 4	(10–18)	Kim Cha-Youn, Choi Im-jeong 8	Ginásio José Corrêa, Barueri; Attendance: 300; Referees: Marina, Minore (ARG)
9 December 2011; 18:00	4× (yellow card) 3× (suspension)	Report	3× (yellow card) 2× (suspension)	Ginásio José Corrêa, Barueri; Attendance: 300; Referees: Marina, Minore (ARG)

9 December 2011; 20:15	Russia	34 – 19	Kazakhstan	Ginásio José Corrêa, Barueri; Attendance: 200; Referees: Abid, Chaouch (TUN)
9 December 2011; 20:15	Turey 7	(13–13)	Volnukhina 6	Ginásio José Corrêa, Barueri; Attendance: 200; Referees: Abid, Chaouch (TUN)
9 December 2011; 20:15	4× (yellow card) 6× (suspension)	Report	2× (yellow card) 10× (suspension)	Ginásio José Corrêa, Barueri; Attendance: 200; Referees: Abid, Chaouch (TUN)

=== Group C ===
Pos	Team	Pld	W	D	L	GF	GA	GD	Pts	Qualification
1	Brazil	5	5	0	0	162	128	+34	10	Round of 16
2	France	5	4	0	1	165	103	+62	8	Round of 16
3	Romania	5	2	1	2	139	155	−16	5	Round of 16
4	Japan	5	2	1	2	138	156	−18	5	Round of 16
5	Tunisia	5	1	0	4	141	150	−9	2	
6	Cuba	5	0	0	5	119	172	−53	0	

2 December 2011; 21:00	Brazil	37 – 21	Cuba	Ginásio do Ibirapuera, São Paulo; Attendance: 3,000; Referees: Arntsen, Gullaksen (NOR)
2 December 2011; 21:00	da Silva 8	(17–11)	Ramírez 9	Ginásio do Ibirapuera, São Paulo; Attendance: 3,000; Referees: Arntsen, Gullaksen (NOR)
2 December 2011; 21:00	2× (yellow card) 3× (suspension)	Report	3× (yellow card) 4× (suspension)	Ginásio do Ibirapuera, São Paulo; Attendance: 3,000; Referees: Arntsen, Gullaksen (NOR)

3 December 2011; 15:00	Romania	30 – 28	Tunisia	Ginásio do Ibirapuera, São Paulo; Attendance: 500; Referees: Al Suwaidi, Bamatraf (QAT)
3 December 2011; 15:00	Fiera 8	(14–15)	three players 5	Ginásio do Ibirapuera, São Paulo; Attendance: 500; Referees: Al Suwaidi, Bamatraf (QAT)
3 December 2011; 15:00	3× (yellow card) 4× (suspension)	Report	3× (yellow card) 1× (suspension)	Ginásio do Ibirapuera, São Paulo; Attendance: 500; Referees: Al Suwaidi, Bamatraf (QAT)

3 December 2011; 17:15	France	41 – 22	Japan	Ginásio do Ibirapuera, São Paulo; Attendance: 500; Referees: Cohen, Peretz (ISR)
3 December 2011; 17:15	Ayglon 6	(18–13)	Fujii 6	Ginásio do Ibirapuera, São Paulo; Attendance: 500; Referees: Cohen, Peretz (ISR)
3 December 2011; 17:15	2× (yellow card)	Report	2× (yellow card) 1× (suspension)	Ginásio do Ibirapuera, São Paulo; Attendance: 500; Referees: Cohen, Peretz (ISR)

5 December 2011; 15:00	Cuba	27 – 33	Romania	Ginásio do Ibirapuera, São Paulo; Attendance: 300; Referees: Liu, Liu (CHN)
5 December 2011; 15:00	Lusson 8	(14–20)	four players 5	Ginásio do Ibirapuera, São Paulo; Attendance: 300; Referees: Liu, Liu (CHN)
5 December 2011; 15:00	2× (yellow card) 2× (suspension)	Report	3× (yellow card) 2× (suspension)	Ginásio do Ibirapuera, São Paulo; Attendance: 300; Referees: Liu, Liu (CHN)

5 December 2011; 17:15	Tunisia	17 – 25	France	Ginásio do Ibirapuera, São Paulo; Attendance: 500; Referees: García, Marin (ESP)
5 December 2011; 17:15	Chebbah 6	(9–12)	Deroin 6	Ginásio do Ibirapuera, São Paulo; Attendance: 500; Referees: García, Marin (ESP)
5 December 2011; 17:15	3× (yellow card) 4× (suspension)	Report	3× (yellow card) 4× (suspension)	Ginásio do Ibirapuera, São Paulo; Attendance: 500; Referees: García, Marin (ESP)

5 December 2011; 19:45	Japan	24 – 32	Brazil	Ginásio do Ibirapuera, São Paulo; Attendance: 1,500; Referees: Gatelis, Mazeika (LTU)
5 December 2011; 19:45	Kamimachi 7	(12–16)	do Nascimento 7	Ginásio do Ibirapuera, São Paulo; Attendance: 1,500; Referees: Gatelis, Mazeika (LTU)
5 December 2011; 19:45	2× (yellow card) 4× (suspension)	Report	3× (yellow card) 5× (suspension)	Ginásio do Ibirapuera, São Paulo; Attendance: 1,500; Referees: Gatelis, Mazeika (LTU)

6 December 2011; 15:00	Tunisia	32 – 29	Cuba	Ginásio do Ibirapuera, São Paulo; Attendance: 200; Referees: Arntsen, Gullaksen (NOR)
6 December 2011; 15:00	Khouildi 8	(18–11)	Gómez 9	Ginásio do Ibirapuera, São Paulo; Attendance: 200; Referees: Arntsen, Gullaksen (NOR)
6 December 2011; 15:00	2× (yellow card) 8× (suspension)	Report	2× (yellow card) 5× (suspension)	Ginásio do Ibirapuera, São Paulo; Attendance: 200; Referees: Arntsen, Gullaksen (NOR)

6 December 2011; 17:15	Romania	28 – 28	Japan	Ginásio do Ibirapuera, São Paulo; Attendance: 600; Referees: García, Marin (ESP)
6 December 2011; 17:15	Ardean-Elisei 9	(13–12)	Fujii 11	Ginásio do Ibirapuera, São Paulo; Attendance: 600; Referees: García, Marin (ESP)
6 December 2011; 17:15	3× (yellow card) 7× (suspension)	Report	3× (yellow card) 4× (suspension)	Ginásio do Ibirapuera, São Paulo; Attendance: 600; Referees: García, Marin (ESP)

6 December 2011; 19:45	France	22 – 26	Brazil	Ginásio do Ibirapuera, São Paulo; Attendance: 3,500; Referees: Al Suwaidi, Bamatraf (QAT)
6 December 2011; 19:45	Pineau 5	(17–10)	Rodrigues 6	Ginásio do Ibirapuera, São Paulo; Attendance: 3,500; Referees: Al Suwaidi, Bamatraf (QAT)
6 December 2011; 19:45	3× (yellow card) 1× (suspension)	Report	1× (yellow card) 4× (suspension)	Ginásio do Ibirapuera, São Paulo; Attendance: 3,500; Referees: Al Suwaidi, Bamatraf (QAT)

8 December 2011; 15:00	Japan	32 – 31	Tunisia	Ginásio do Ibirapuera, São Paulo; Attendance: 500; Referees: Gatelis, Mazeika (LTU)
8 December 2011; 15:00	Fujii 11	(16–16)	Toumi 12	Ginásio do Ibirapuera, São Paulo; Attendance: 500; Referees: Gatelis, Mazeika (LTU)
8 December 2011; 15:00	3× (yellow card) 4× (suspension)	Report	3× (yellow card) 7× (suspension) 1× (red card)	Ginásio do Ibirapuera, São Paulo; Attendance: 500; Referees: Gatelis, Mazeika (LTU)

8 December 2011; 17:15	France	38 – 18	Cuba	Ginásio do Ibirapuera, São Paulo; Attendance: 1,000; Referees: Hizaki, Ikebuchi (JPN)
8 December 2011; 17:15	Spincer 6	(17–8)	Ramírez 5	Ginásio do Ibirapuera, São Paulo; Attendance: 1,000; Referees: Hizaki, Ikebuchi (JPN)
8 December 2011; 17:15	3× (yellow card)	Report	2× (yellow card) 6× (suspension)	Ginásio do Ibirapuera, São Paulo; Attendance: 1,000; Referees: Hizaki, Ikebuchi (JPN)

8 December 2011; 19:45	Brazil	33 – 28	Romania	Ginásio do Ibirapuera, São Paulo; Attendance: 3,000; Referees: Cohen, Peretz (ISR)
8 December 2011; 19:45	do Nascimento 8	(14–11)	Brădeanu, Curea 5	Ginásio do Ibirapuera, São Paulo; Attendance: 3,000; Referees: Cohen, Peretz (ISR)
8 December 2011; 19:45	3× (yellow card) 7× (suspension)	Report	4× (yellow card) 6× (suspension)	Ginásio do Ibirapuera, São Paulo; Attendance: 3,000; Referees: Cohen, Peretz (ISR)

9 December 2011; 15:00	Cuba	24 – 32	Japan	Ginásio do Ibirapuera, São Paulo; Attendance: 200; Referees: Liu, Liu (CHN)
9 December 2011; 15:00	Fernández 9	(9–16)	Kamimachi 10	Ginásio do Ibirapuera, São Paulo; Attendance: 200; Referees: Liu, Liu (CHN)
9 December 2011; 15:00	3× (yellow card) 5× (suspension)	Report	3× (yellow card) 1× (suspension)	Ginásio do Ibirapuera, São Paulo; Attendance: 200; Referees: Liu, Liu (CHN)

9 December 2011; 17:15	Romania	20 – 39	France	Ginásio do Ibirapuera, São Paulo; Attendance: 600; Referees: García, Marin (ESP)
9 December 2011; 17:15	Manea 4	(12–20)	Baudouin 10	Ginásio do Ibirapuera, São Paulo; Attendance: 600; Referees: García, Marin (ESP)
9 December 2011; 17:15	3× (yellow card) 3× (suspension)	Report	3× (yellow card) 5× (suspension)	Ginásio do Ibirapuera, São Paulo; Attendance: 600; Referees: García, Marin (ESP)

9 December 2011; 19:45	Brazil	34 – 33	Tunisia	Ginásio do Ibirapuera, São Paulo; Attendance: 1,500; Referees: Al Suwaidi, Bamatraf (QAT)
9 December 2011; 19:45	Moraes 8	(16–20)	Marzouk 10	Ginásio do Ibirapuera, São Paulo; Attendance: 1,500; Referees: Al Suwaidi, Bamatraf (QAT)
9 December 2011; 19:45	3× (yellow card) 6× (suspension)	Report	3× (yellow card) 4× (suspension)	Ginásio do Ibirapuera, São Paulo; Attendance: 1,500; Referees: Al Suwaidi, Bamatraf (QAT)

=== Group D ===
Pos	Team	Pld	W	D	L	GF	GA	GD	Pts	Qualification
1	Denmark	5	5	0	0	148	78	+70	10	Round of 16
2	Croatia	5	4	0	1	150	102	+48	8	Round of 16
3	Sweden	5	3	0	2	141	97	+44	6	Round of 16
4	Ivory Coast	5	2	0	3	118	145	−27	4	Round of 16
5	Uruguay	5	1	0	4	82	159	−77	2	
6	Argentina	5	0	0	5	77	135	−58	0	

3 December 2011; 13:00	Sweden	37 – 11	Argentina	Ginásio Adib Moyses Dib, São Bernardo do Campo; Referees: Hizaki, Ikebuchi (JPN)
3 December 2011; 13:00	Boson, Fogelström 5	(19–7)	Mendoza 3	Ginásio Adib Moyses Dib, São Bernardo do Campo; Referees: Hizaki, Ikebuchi (JPN)
3 December 2011; 13:00	4× (yellow card) 2× (suspension)	Report	2× (yellow card) 3× (suspension)	Ginásio Adib Moyses Dib, São Bernardo do Campo; Referees: Hizaki, Ikebuchi (JPN)

3 December 2011; 15:15	Denmark	36 – 10	Uruguay	Ginásio Adib Moyses Dib, São Bernardo do Campo; Attendance: 400; Referees: Liu, Liu (CHN)
3 December 2011; 15:15	Kristiansen 7	(20–6)	Falco 3	Ginásio Adib Moyses Dib, São Bernardo do Campo; Attendance: 400; Referees: Liu, Liu (CHN)
3 December 2011; 15:15	3× (yellow card) 3× (suspension)	Report	3× (yellow card) 2× (suspension)	Ginásio Adib Moyses Dib, São Bernardo do Campo; Attendance: 400; Referees: Liu, Liu (CHN)

3 December 2011; 17:30	Croatia	36 – 20	Ivory Coast	Ginásio Adib Moyses Dib, São Bernardo do Campo; Attendance: 400; Referees: Gatelis, Mazeika (LTU)
3 December 2011; 17:30	Penezić 7	(20–10)	Mambo 5	Ginásio Adib Moyses Dib, São Bernardo do Campo; Attendance: 400; Referees: Gatelis, Mazeika (LTU)
3 December 2011; 17:30	3× (yellow card) 6× (suspension)	Report	2× (yellow card) 3× (suspension)	Ginásio Adib Moyses Dib, São Bernardo do Campo; Attendance: 400; Referees: Gatelis, Mazeika (LTU)

5 December 2011; 15:15	Ivory Coast	25 – 28	Sweden	Ginásio Adib Moyses Dib, São Bernardo do Campo; Attendance: 500; Referees: Al Suwaidi, Bamatraf (QAT)
5 December 2011; 15:15	Mambo 8	(14–15)	Gulldén 5	Ginásio Adib Moyses Dib, São Bernardo do Campo; Attendance: 500; Referees: Al Suwaidi, Bamatraf (QAT)
5 December 2011; 15:15	2× (yellow card) 2× (suspension)	Report	3× (yellow card) 2× (suspension)	Ginásio Adib Moyses Dib, São Bernardo do Campo; Attendance: 500; Referees: Al Suwaidi, Bamatraf (QAT)

5 December 2011; 17:45	Argentina	13 – 31	Denmark	Ginásio Adib Moyses Dib, São Bernardo do Campo; Attendance: 500; Referees: Arntsen, Gullaksen (NOR)
5 December 2011; 17:45	Salvado 4	(5–18)	Kristiansen 6	Ginásio Adib Moyses Dib, São Bernardo do Campo; Attendance: 500; Referees: Arntsen, Gullaksen (NOR)
5 December 2011; 17:45	2× (yellow card) 3× (suspension)	Report	1× (yellow card) 3× (suspension)	Ginásio Adib Moyses Dib, São Bernardo do Campo; Attendance: 500; Referees: Arntsen, Gullaksen (NOR)

5 December 2011; 20:00	Uruguay	15 – 45	Croatia	Ginásio Adib Moyses Dib, São Bernardo do Campo; Attendance: 500; Referees: Hizaki, Ikebuchi (JPN)
5 December 2011; 20:00	Castro 5	(9–21)	Jovetić 6	Ginásio Adib Moyses Dib, São Bernardo do Campo; Attendance: 500; Referees: Hizaki, Ikebuchi (JPN)
5 December 2011; 20:00	3× (yellow card) 2× (suspension)	Report	1× (yellow card)	Ginásio Adib Moyses Dib, São Bernardo do Campo; Attendance: 500; Referees: Hizaki, Ikebuchi (JPN)

6 December 2011; 15:15	Sweden	31 – 14	Uruguay	Ginásio Adib Moyses Dib, São Bernardo do Campo; Attendance: 400; Referees: Hizaki, Ikebuchi (JPN)
6 December 2011; 15:15	Roberts 6	(13–7)	three players 3	Ginásio Adib Moyses Dib, São Bernardo do Campo; Attendance: 400; Referees: Hizaki, Ikebuchi (JPN)
6 December 2011; 15:15	2× (yellow card) 4× (suspension)	Report	3× (yellow card) 1× (suspension)	Ginásio Adib Moyses Dib, São Bernardo do Campo; Attendance: 400; Referees: Hizaki, Ikebuchi (JPN)

6 December 2011; 17:45	Denmark	23 – 19	Croatia	Ginásio Adib Moyses Dib, São Bernardo do Campo; Attendance: 500; Referees: Gatelis, Mazeika (LTU)
6 December 2011; 17:45	Troelsen 6	(10–8)	Penezić 9	Ginásio Adib Moyses Dib, São Bernardo do Campo; Attendance: 500; Referees: Gatelis, Mazeika (LTU)
6 December 2011; 17:45	3× (yellow card) 7× (suspension)	Report	4× (yellow card) 5× (suspension)	Ginásio Adib Moyses Dib, São Bernardo do Campo; Attendance: 500; Referees: Gatelis, Mazeika (LTU)

6 December 2011; 20:00	Argentina	19 – 25	Ivory Coast	Ginásio Adib Moyses Dib, São Bernardo do Campo; Attendance: 500; Referees: Cohen, Peretz (ISR)
6 December 2011; 20:00	Decilio, Mendoza 5	(8–14)	Gondo, Toualy 5	Ginásio Adib Moyses Dib, São Bernardo do Campo; Attendance: 500; Referees: Cohen, Peretz (ISR)
6 December 2011; 20:00	2× (yellow card) 4× (suspension)	Report	2× (yellow card) 6× (suspension)	Ginásio Adib Moyses Dib, São Bernardo do Campo; Attendance: 500; Referees: Cohen, Peretz (ISR)

8 December 2011; 15:00	Croatia	27 – 26	Sweden	Ginásio Adib Moyses Dib, São Bernardo do Campo; Attendance: 500; Referees: García, Marin (ESP)
8 December 2011; 15:00	Franić 7	(14–12)	Torstenson 10	Ginásio Adib Moyses Dib, São Bernardo do Campo; Attendance: 500; Referees: García, Marin (ESP)
8 December 2011; 15:00	4× (yellow card) 5× (suspension)	Report	4× (yellow card) 5× (suspension)	Ginásio Adib Moyses Dib, São Bernardo do Campo; Attendance: 500; Referees: García, Marin (ESP)

8 December 2011; 17:15	Denmark	38 – 17	Ivory Coast	Ginásio Adib Moyses Dib, São Bernardo do Campo; Attendance: 300; Referees: Arntsen, Gullaksen (NOR)
8 December 2011; 17:15	Bille 8	(22–7)	Mambo, Courcelles 3	Ginásio Adib Moyses Dib, São Bernardo do Campo; Attendance: 300; Referees: Arntsen, Gullaksen (NOR)
8 December 2011; 17:15	3× (yellow card)	Report	3× (yellow card) 3× (suspension)	Ginásio Adib Moyses Dib, São Bernardo do Campo; Attendance: 300; Referees: Arntsen, Gullaksen (NOR)

8 December 2011; 19:30	Uruguay	19 – 16	Argentina	Ginásio Adib Moyses Dib, São Bernardo do Campo; Attendance: 200; Referees: Liu, Liu (CHN)
8 December 2011; 19:30	Castro 6	(11–11)	Mendoza 6	Ginásio Adib Moyses Dib, São Bernardo do Campo; Attendance: 200; Referees: Liu, Liu (CHN)
8 December 2011; 19:30	2× (yellow card) 3× (suspension)	Report	3× (yellow card) 4× (suspension)	Ginásio Adib Moyses Dib, São Bernardo do Campo; Attendance: 200; Referees: Liu, Liu (CHN)

9 December 2011; 15:00	Ivory Coast	31 – 24	Uruguay	Ginásio Adib Moyses Dib, São Bernardo do Campo; Attendance: 300; Referees: Hizaki, Ikebuchi (JPN)
9 December 2011; 15:00	Mambo 9	(12–12)	Castro 8	Ginásio Adib Moyses Dib, São Bernardo do Campo; Attendance: 300; Referees: Hizaki, Ikebuchi (JPN)
9 December 2011; 15:00	3× (yellow card) 2× (suspension)	Report	3× (yellow card) 2× (suspension)	Ginásio Adib Moyses Dib, São Bernardo do Campo; Attendance: 300; Referees: Hizaki, Ikebuchi (JPN)

9 December 2011; 17:15	Sweden	19 – 20	Denmark	Ginásio Adib Moyses Dib, São Bernardo do Campo; Attendance: 1,500; Referees: Gatelis, Mazeika (LTU)
9 December 2011; 17:15	Ahlm 8	(8–9)	Jørgensen, Nørgaard 4	Ginásio Adib Moyses Dib, São Bernardo do Campo; Attendance: 1,500; Referees: Gatelis, Mazeika (LTU)
9 December 2011; 17:15	3× (yellow card) 4× (suspension)	Report	3× (yellow card) 5× (suspension)	Ginásio Adib Moyses Dib, São Bernardo do Campo; Attendance: 1,500; Referees: Gatelis, Mazeika (LTU)

9 December 2011; 19:30	Croatia	23 – 18	Argentina	Ginásio Adib Moyses Dib, São Bernardo do Campo; Attendance: 400; Referees: Cohen, Peretz (ISR)
9 December 2011; 19:30	Zebić 6	(9–11)	Decilio 4	Ginásio Adib Moyses Dib, São Bernardo do Campo; Attendance: 400; Referees: Cohen, Peretz (ISR)
9 December 2011; 19:30	3× (yellow card) 10× (suspension)	Report	3× (yellow card) 4× (suspension)	Ginásio Adib Moyses Dib, São Bernardo do Campo; Attendance: 400; Referees: Cohen, Peretz (ISR)

== President's Cup ==
=== 17–20th place semifinals ===
11 December 2011; 11:45	Germany	37 – 14	Kazakhstan	Ginásio do Ibirapuera, São Paulo; Attendance: 100; Referees: Arntsen, Gullaksen (NOR)
11 December 2011; 11:45	Nadgornaja 6	(15–6)	Volnukhina 6	Ginásio do Ibirapuera, São Paulo; Attendance: 100; Referees: Arntsen, Gullaksen (NOR)
11 December 2011; 11:45	2× (yellow card)	Report	3× (yellow card) 5× (suspension) 1× (red card)	Ginásio do Ibirapuera, São Paulo; Attendance: 100; Referees: Arntsen, Gullaksen (NOR)

11 December 2011; 14:30	Tunisia	34 – 17	Uruguay	Ginásio do Ibirapuera, São Paulo; Attendance: 100; Referees: García, Marin (ESP)
11 December 2011; 14:30	Elghaoui 9	(14–10)	Palla 4	Ginásio do Ibirapuera, São Paulo; Attendance: 100; Referees: García, Marin (ESP)
11 December 2011; 14:30	3× (yellow card)	Report	3× (yellow card) 4× (suspension)	Ginásio do Ibirapuera, São Paulo; Attendance: 100; Referees: García, Marin (ESP)

=== 21st–24th place semifinals ===
11 December 2011; 17:15	China	45 – 11	Australia	Ginásio do Ibirapuera, São Paulo; Attendance: 100; Referees: Hizaki, Ikebuchi (JPN)
11 December 2011; 17:15	Lan Chunlei 11	(22–4)	Cook 4	Ginásio do Ibirapuera, São Paulo; Attendance: 100; Referees: Hizaki, Ikebuchi (JPN)
11 December 2011; 17:15	2× (yellow card) 2× (suspension)	Report	3× (yellow card) 2× (suspension)	Ginásio do Ibirapuera, São Paulo; Attendance: 100; Referees: Hizaki, Ikebuchi (JPN)

11 December 2011; 19:30	Cuba	25 – 20	Argentina	Ginásio do Ibirapuera, São Paulo; Attendance: 100; Referees: Al Suwaidi, Bamatraf (QAT)
11 December 2011; 19:30	Lusson 9	(12–11)	Mendoza 4	Ginásio do Ibirapuera, São Paulo; Attendance: 100; Referees: Al Suwaidi, Bamatraf (QAT)
11 December 2011; 19:30	2× (yellow card) 11× (suspension)	Report	3× (yellow card) 7× (suspension)	Ginásio do Ibirapuera, São Paulo; Attendance: 100; Referees: Al Suwaidi, Bamatraf (QAT)

=== 23rd place game ===
12 December 2011; 11:45	Australia	12 – 30	Argentina	Ginásio Adib Moyses Dib, São Bernardo do Campo; Attendance: 100; Referees: Liu, Liu (CHN)
12 December 2011; 11:45	Hudson-Gofers 4	(4–12)	Ferrea 7	Ginásio Adib Moyses Dib, São Bernardo do Campo; Attendance: 100; Referees: Liu, Liu (CHN)
12 December 2011; 11:45	3× (yellow card) 3× (suspension)	Report	3× (yellow card) 1× (suspension)	Ginásio Adib Moyses Dib, São Bernardo do Campo; Attendance: 100; Referees: Liu, Liu (CHN)

=== 21st place game ===
12 December 2011; 20:00	China	30 – 29	Cuba	Ginásio Adib Moyses Dib, São Bernardo do Campo; Attendance: 200; Referees: Abid, Chaouch (TUN)
12 December 2011; 20:00	Li Yao 8	(15–13)	Lusson 10	Ginásio Adib Moyses Dib, São Bernardo do Campo; Attendance: 200; Referees: Abid, Chaouch (TUN)
12 December 2011; 20:00	3× (yellow card) 1× (suspension)	Report	3× (yellow card) 2× (suspension)	Ginásio Adib Moyses Dib, São Bernardo do Campo; Attendance: 200; Referees: Abid, Chaouch (TUN)

=== 19th place game ===
12 December 2011; 11:45	Kazakhstan	31 – 22	Uruguay	Ginásio do Ibirapuera, São Paulo; Attendance: 100; Referees: Menezes, Pinto (BRA)
12 December 2011; 11:45	Volnukhina 12	(17–9)	Castro 8	Ginásio do Ibirapuera, São Paulo; Attendance: 100; Referees: Menezes, Pinto (BRA)
12 December 2011; 11:45	3× (yellow card) 4× (suspension)	Report	3× (yellow card) 4× (suspension)	Ginásio do Ibirapuera, São Paulo; Attendance: 100; Referees: Menezes, Pinto (BRA)

=== 17th place game ===
12 December 2011; 17:15	Germany	33 – 25	Tunisia	Ginásio do Ibirapuera, São Paulo; Attendance: 800; Referees: Marina, Minore (ARG)
12 December 2011; 17:15	Nadgornaja 11	(16–14)	Chebbah 5	Ginásio do Ibirapuera, São Paulo; Attendance: 800; Referees: Marina, Minore (ARG)
12 December 2011; 17:15	2× (yellow card) 3× (suspension)	Report	3× (yellow card) 2× (suspension)	Ginásio do Ibirapuera, São Paulo; Attendance: 800; Referees: Marina, Minore (ARG)

== Knockout stage ==
Championship bracket

Round of 16
11 December
Russia	30
Iceland	19
12 December
Sweden	23
France	26
11 December
Angola	30
South Korea	29
12 December
Japan	22
Denmark	23
11 December
Norway	34
Netherlands	22
12 December
Romania	27
Croatia	28
11 December
Spain	23
Montenegro	19
12 December
Ivory Coast	22
Brazil	35

Quarter-finals
14 December
Russia	23
France	25
14 December
Angola	23
Denmark	28
14 December
Norway	30
Croatia	25
14 December
Spain	27
Brazil	26

Semi-finals
16 December
France	28
Denmark	23
16 December
Norway	30
Spain	22

Final
18 December
France	24
Norway	32
Third place
18 December
Denmark	18
Spain	24

5th place bracket

Semi-finals
16 December
Russia	41
Angola	31
16 December
Croatia	31
Brazil	32

Fifth place
18 December
Russia	20
Brazil	36
Seventh place
18 December
Angola	29
Croatia	32

=== Round of 16 ===
11 December 2011; 14:30	South Korea	29 – 30	Angola	Arena Santos, Santos; Attendance: 600; Referees: Bonaventura, Bonaventura (FRA)
11 December 2011; 14:30	Choi Im-jeong 10	(13–13)	L. Kiala 7	Arena Santos, Santos; Attendance: 600; Referees: Bonaventura, Bonaventura (FRA)
11 December 2011; 14:30	2× (yellow card) 7× (suspension)	Report	3× (yellow card) 2× (suspension)	Arena Santos, Santos; Attendance: 600; Referees: Bonaventura, Bonaventura (FRA)

11 December 2011; 14:30	Russia	30 – 19	Iceland	Ginásio José Corrêa, Barueri; Attendance: 400; Referees: Marina, Minore (ARG)
11 December 2011; 14:30	Postnova 7	(15–12)	Knútsdóttir 4	Ginásio José Corrêa, Barueri; Attendance: 400; Referees: Marina, Minore (ARG)
11 December 2011; 14:30	4× (yellow card) 5× (suspension)	Report	4× (yellow card) 5× (suspension)	Ginásio José Corrêa, Barueri; Attendance: 400; Referees: Marina, Minore (ARG)

11 December 2011; 17:15	Norway	34 – 22	Netherlands	Arena Santos, Santos; Attendance: 700; Referees: Menezes, Pinto (BRA)
11 December 2011; 17:15	Løke 8	(15–11)	van der Heijden, Bont 5	Arena Santos, Santos; Attendance: 700; Referees: Menezes, Pinto (BRA)
11 December 2011; 17:15	3× (yellow card) 4× (suspension)	Report	3× (yellow card) 4× (suspension)	Arena Santos, Santos; Attendance: 700; Referees: Menezes, Pinto (BRA)

11 December 2011; 17:15	Montenegro	19 – 23	Spain	Ginásio José Corrêa, Barueri; Attendance: 400; Referees: Gjeding, Hansen (DEN)
11 December 2011; 17:15	Jovanović 5	(9–11)	E. Pinedo 7	Ginásio José Corrêa, Barueri; Attendance: 400; Referees: Gjeding, Hansen (DEN)
11 December 2011; 17:15	4× (yellow card) 3× (suspension)	Report	2× (yellow card) 2× (suspension)	Ginásio José Corrêa, Barueri; Attendance: 400; Referees: Gjeding, Hansen (DEN)

12 December 2011; 14:30	Sweden	23 – 26	France	Ginásio do Ibirapuera, São Paulo; Attendance: 400; Referees: Gubica, Milošević (CRO)
12 December 2011; 14:30	Torstenson, Gulldén 5	(15–12)	Baudouin 6	Ginásio do Ibirapuera, São Paulo; Attendance: 400; Referees: Gubica, Milošević (CRO)
12 December 2011; 14:30	3× (yellow card) 2× (suspension)	Report	3× (yellow card) 3× (suspension)	Ginásio do Ibirapuera, São Paulo; Attendance: 400; Referees: Gubica, Milošević (CRO)

12 December 2011; 14:30	Romania	27 – 28	Croatia	Ginásio Adib Moyses Dib, São Bernardo do Campo; Attendance: 300; Referees: Kliko, Johansson (SWE)
12 December 2011; 14:30	Șoit 6	(18–15)	Penezić 6	Ginásio Adib Moyses Dib, São Bernardo do Campo; Attendance: 300; Referees: Kliko, Johansson (SWE)
12 December 2011; 14:30	3× (yellow card) 5× (suspension)	Report	4× (yellow card) 4× (suspension)	Ginásio Adib Moyses Dib, São Bernardo do Campo; Attendance: 300; Referees: Kliko, Johansson (SWE)

12 December 2011
17:15
Denmark
23 – 22 (ET)
Japan
Ginásio Adib Moyses Dib, São Bernardo do Campo
Attendance: 500
Referees: Cohen, Peretz (ISR)
Troelsen 6
(9–11)
Fujii 8
4× (yellow card) 4× (suspension)
Report
3× (yellow card) 1× (suspension)

FT: 19–19 ET: 4–3

12 December 2011; 20:00	Brazil	35 – 22	Ivory Coast	Ginásio do Ibirapuera, São Paulo; Attendance: 4,000; Referees: Hizaki, Ikebuchi (JPN)
12 December 2011; 20:00	do Nascimento 10	(15–8)	Mambo 8	Ginásio do Ibirapuera, São Paulo; Attendance: 4,000; Referees: Hizaki, Ikebuchi (JPN)
12 December 2011; 20:00	2× (yellow card) 1× (suspension)	Report	3× (yellow card) 1× (suspension) 1× (red card)	Ginásio do Ibirapuera, São Paulo; Attendance: 4,000; Referees: Hizaki, Ikebuchi (JPN)

=== Quarterfinals ===
14 December 2011; 11:45	Russia	23 – 25	France	Ginásio do Ibirapuera, São Paulo; Attendance: 2,000; Referees: García, Marin (ESP)
14 December 2011; 11:45	Turey 7	(12–13)	Lacrabère 5	Ginásio do Ibirapuera, São Paulo; Attendance: 2,000; Referees: García, Marin (ESP)
14 December 2011; 11:45	3× (yellow card) 5× (suspension)	Report	3× (yellow card) 4× (suspension)	Ginásio do Ibirapuera, São Paulo; Attendance: 2,000; Referees: García, Marin (ESP)

14 December 2011; 14:30	Angola	23 – 28	Denmark	Ginásio do Ibirapuera, São Paulo; Attendance: 2,000; Referees: Gatelis, Mazeika (LTU)
14 December 2011; 14:30	Carlos 7	(11–15)	Nørgaard 7	Ginásio do Ibirapuera, São Paulo; Attendance: 2,000; Referees: Gatelis, Mazeika (LTU)
14 December 2011; 14:30	1× (yellow card) 2× (suspension)	Report	4× (yellow card) 4× (suspension)	Ginásio do Ibirapuera, São Paulo; Attendance: 2,000; Referees: Gatelis, Mazeika (LTU)

14 December 2011; 17:15	Croatia	25 – 30	Norway	Ginásio do Ibirapuera, São Paulo; Attendance: 1,300; Referees: Al Suwaidi, Bumatraf (QAT)
14 December 2011; 17:15	Penezić 4	(12–16)	Løke 8	Ginásio do Ibirapuera, São Paulo; Attendance: 1,300; Referees: Al Suwaidi, Bumatraf (QAT)
14 December 2011; 17:15	4× (yellow card) 5× (suspension) 1× (red card)	Report	3× (yellow card) 5× (suspension)	Ginásio do Ibirapuera, São Paulo; Attendance: 1,300; Referees: Al Suwaidi, Bumatraf (QAT)

14 December 2011; 20:00	Spain	27 – 26	Brazil	Ginásio do Ibirapuera, São Paulo; Attendance: 6,000; Referees: Gjeding, Hansen (DEN)
14 December 2011; 20:00	Martín 8	(19–17)	do Nascimento, Cavaleiro 7	Ginásio do Ibirapuera, São Paulo; Attendance: 6,000; Referees: Gjeding, Hansen (DEN)
14 December 2011; 20:00	3× (yellow card) 5× (suspension)	Report	4× (yellow card) 6× (suspension)	Ginásio do Ibirapuera, São Paulo; Attendance: 6,000; Referees: Gjeding, Hansen (DEN)

=== 5th–8th semifinals ===
16 December 2011; 11:45	Russia	41 – 31	Angola	Ginásio do Ibirapuera, São Paulo; Attendance: 200; Referees: Coulibaly, Diabate (CIV)
16 December 2011; 11:45	Shipilova 6	(17–18)	Calandula 5	Ginásio do Ibirapuera, São Paulo; Attendance: 200; Referees: Coulibaly, Diabate (CIV)
16 December 2011; 11:45	1× (yellow card) 5× (suspension)	Report	3× (yellow card) 5× (suspension)	Ginásio do Ibirapuera, São Paulo; Attendance: 200; Referees: Coulibaly, Diabate (CIV)

16 December 2011; 14:30	Croatia	31 – 32	Brazil	Ginásio do Ibirapuera, São Paulo; Attendance: 200; Referees: Kliko, Johansson (SWE)
16 December 2011; 14:30	Penezić 10	(15–14)	do Nascimento 7	Ginásio do Ibirapuera, São Paulo; Attendance: 200; Referees: Kliko, Johansson (SWE)
16 December 2011; 14:30	3× (yellow card) 4× (suspension)	Report	3× (yellow card) 4× (suspension)	Ginásio do Ibirapuera, São Paulo; Attendance: 200; Referees: Kliko, Johansson (SWE)

=== Semifinals ===
16 December 2011; 17:15	France	28 – 23	Denmark	Ginásio do Ibirapuera, São Paulo; Attendance: 1,500; Referees: Gubica, Milošević (CRO)
16 December 2011; 17:15	Lacrabère 10	(14–12)	Jørgensen 7	Ginásio do Ibirapuera, São Paulo; Attendance: 1,500; Referees: Gubica, Milošević (CRO)
16 December 2011; 17:15	3× (yellow card) 3× (suspension)	Report	2× (yellow card) 5× (suspension)	Ginásio do Ibirapuera, São Paulo; Attendance: 1,500; Referees: Gubica, Milošević (CRO)

16 December 2011; 20:00	Norway	30 – 22	Spain	Ginásio do Ibirapuera, São Paulo; Attendance: 2,500; Referees: Gatelis, Mazeika (LTU)
16 December 2011; 20:00	Løke 7	(16–9)	Aguilar 6	Ginásio do Ibirapuera, São Paulo; Attendance: 2,500; Referees: Gatelis, Mazeika (LTU)
16 December 2011; 20:00	3× (yellow card) 4× (suspension)	Report	4× (yellow card) 3× (suspension)	Ginásio do Ibirapuera, São Paulo; Attendance: 2,500; Referees: Gatelis, Mazeika (LTU)

=== Seventh place game ===
18 December 2011; 11:45	Angola	29 – 32	Croatia	Ginásio do Ibirapuera, São Paulo; Attendance: 500; Referees: Arntsen, Gullaksen (NOR)
18 December 2011; 11:45	L. Kiala, Carlos 7	(12–14)	Zebić 11	Ginásio do Ibirapuera, São Paulo; Attendance: 500; Referees: Arntsen, Gullaksen (NOR)
18 December 2011; 11:45	3× (yellow card) 2× (suspension)	Report	2× (yellow card) 3× (suspension)	Ginásio do Ibirapuera, São Paulo; Attendance: 500; Referees: Arntsen, Gullaksen (NOR)

=== Fifth place game ===
18 December 2011; 09:00	Russia	20 – 36	Brazil	Ginásio do Ibirapuera, São Paulo; Attendance: 1,500; Referees: Bonaventura, Bonaventura (FRA)
18 December 2011; 09:00	Bliznova 5	(11–18)	do Nascimento 8	Ginásio do Ibirapuera, São Paulo; Attendance: 1,500; Referees: Bonaventura, Bonaventura (FRA)
18 December 2011; 09:00	3× (yellow card) 3× (suspension)	Report	2× (yellow card) 3× (suspension)	Ginásio do Ibirapuera, São Paulo; Attendance: 1,500; Referees: Bonaventura, Bonaventura (FRA)

=== Third place game ===
18 December 2011; 14:30	Denmark	18 – 24	Spain	Ginásio do Ibirapuera, São Paulo; Attendance: 2,000; Referees: Cohen, Peretz (ISR)
18 December 2011; 14:30	Nørgaard 4	(9–9)	Martín 10	Ginásio do Ibirapuera, São Paulo; Attendance: 2,000; Referees: Cohen, Peretz (ISR)
18 December 2011; 14:30	4× (yellow card) 4× (suspension)	Report	3× (yellow card) 3× (suspension)	Ginásio do Ibirapuera, São Paulo; Attendance: 2,000; Referees: Cohen, Peretz (ISR)

=== Final ===
18 December 2011; 17:15	France	24 – 32	Norway	Ginásio do Ibirapuera, São Paulo; Attendance: 4,000; Referees: Gubica, Milošević (CRO)
18 December 2011; 17:15	Spincer, Mendy 4	(13–19)	Lunde-Borgersen 6	Ginásio do Ibirapuera, São Paulo; Attendance: 4,000; Referees: Gubica, Milošević (CRO)
18 December 2011; 17:15	3× (yellow card) 5× (suspension)	Report	3× (yellow card) 2× (suspension)	Ginásio do Ibirapuera, São Paulo; Attendance: 4,000; Referees: Gubica, Milošević (CRO)

== Statistics ==
=== Top goalscorers ===
Rank	Name	Goals	Shots	%
1	Alexandra do Nascimento (BRA)	57	78	73%
2	Linn Jørum Sulland (NOR)	51	75	68%
3	Andrea Penezić (CRO)	49	77	64%
4	Shio Fujii (JPN)	46	72	64%
5	Carmen Martín (ESP)	45	57	79%
6	Luisa Kiala (ANG)	44	87	51%
6	Emiliya Turey (RUS)	44	58	76%
8	Heidi Løke (NOR)	43	51	84%
9	Suleiky Gómez (CUB)	42	79	53%
9	Xeniya Volnukhina (KAZ)	42	63	67%

Source: IHF.info

=== Top goalkeepers ===
Rank	Name	%	Saves	Shots
1	Silvia Navarro (ESP)	46%	108	237
2	Clara Wöltering (GER)	44%	64	146
3	Katrine Lunde (NOR)	43%	124	290
3	Karin Mortensen (DEN)	43%	27	63
5	Chana Masson (BRA)	42%	90	216
6	Sonja Barjaktarović (MNE)	40%	34	86
6	Cléopâtre Darleux (FRA)	40%	48	121
6	Christina Pedersen (DEN)	40%	79	198
6	Anna Sedoykina (RUS)	40%	77	192
10	Cecilia Grubbström (SWE)	38%	44	117
10	Gabriella Kain (SWE)	38%	31	81
10	Maria Sidorova (RUS)	38%	59	154

Source: IHF.info

== Ranking and awards ==
No placement matches for places 9 to 16 were played, but as those places might be decisive for qualification to the Olympics, the regulations ranked those teams. The losing teams of the Round of 16 were ranked based on a their group stage record (points, goal-difference, goals scored) against teams placed 1st to 4th (those advancing to the Round of 16).

=== Final ranking ===
Gold medal	Norway
Silver medal	France
Bronze medal	Spain
4	Denmark
5	Brazil
6	Russia
7	Croatia
8	Angola
9	Sweden
10	Montenegro
11	South Korea
12	Iceland
13	Romania
14	Japan
15	Netherlands
16	Ivory Coast
17	Germany
18	Tunisia
19	Kazakhstan
20	Uruguay
21	China
22	Cuba
23	Argentina
24	Australia

2011 Women's World Champions

Norway
First title

Team roster: Marit Malm Frafjord, Kari Aalvik Grimsbø, Mari Molid, Stine Bredal Oftedal, Ida Alstad, Heidi Løke, Tonje Nøstvold, Karoline Dyhre Breivang, Kristine Lunde-Borgersen, Kari Mette Johansen, Gøril Snorroeggen, Katrine Lunde Haraldsen, Linn Jørum Sulland, Linn-Kristin Riegelhuth Koren, Amanda Kurtović, Camilla Herrem.
Head coach: Thorir Hergeirsson.

=== All Star Team ===
- Goalkeeper: Chana Masson (BRA)
- Left wing: Emiliya Turey (RUS)
- Left back: Andrea Penezić (CRO)
- Pivot: Heidi Løke (NOR)
- Centre back: Allison Pineau (FRA)
- Right back: Line Jørgensen (DEN)
- Right wing: Carmen Martín (ESP)

Chosen by team officials and IHF experts: IHF.info

=== Other awards ===
- Top scorer: Alexandra do Nascimento (BRA)
