= Annabelle Courcelles =

Ivorian handball player

Personal information
- Nationality: Ivorian
- Born: 1989 (age 36–37)

Sport
- Sport: Handball
National team
- Years: Team
- –: Ivory Coast

Annabelle Courcelles (born 1989) is an Ivorian team handball player. She plays on the Ivorian national team, and participated at the 2011 World Women's Handball Championship in Brazil.
