= Manon Vernay =

Australian handball player

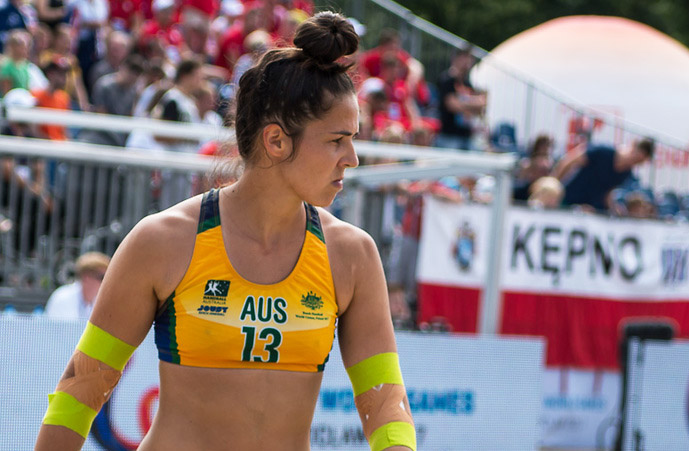

Personal information
- Nationality: French; Australian
- Born: 8 January 1989 (age 37) France
- Height: 1.74 m (5 ft 9 in)

Sport
- Sport: Handball
- Position: Goalkeeper
- Current club: HSV Solingen-Gräfrath

Senior clubs
- Years: Team
- –: West Adelaide Handball Club
- –: Melbourne Handball Club
- –: MTV 1860 Altlandsberg
- –: HSV Solingen-Gräfrath
National team
Years	Team	Apps	(Gls)
2018–	Australia	17	(0)

Manon Vernay (born 1989) is an Australian beach handball player. She plays for Sydney University and represents Australia in the women's national team. Before, Vernay played for various EBT clubs in Germany, Switzerland and France.

Before focusing fully on beach handball, Vernay was an elite basketball player. She then turned to indoor handball and played in Australia and Germany. She last played for HSV Solingen-Gräfrath in Germany and on the Australian national team .

Vernay was best goalkeeper at the Handball Asian Championships in Kumamoto (2018) and represented Australia at the IHF Handball World Championships 2019 in Japan, and 2018 in Russia as well as the World Games 2017 in Poland.

== Awards ==
Beach Handball : Australian Championships Best Goalkeeper : 2018, 2016, 2015 Australian Championships MVP (mixed cat) : 2016

Handball : Oceanian Championships Best Goalkeeper : 2019, 2015 Oceanian Open Clubs Championships Best Goalkeeper : 2017
