= Likane Julie Toualy =

Ivorian handball player

Personal information
- Nationality: Ivorian
- Born: 1976 (age 49–50)

Sport
- Sport: Handball
National team
- Years: Team
- –: Ivory Coast

Likane Julie Toualy (born 1976) is an Ivorian team handball player. She plays on the Ivorian national team, and participated at the 2011 World Women's Handball Championship in Brazil.
