= New Zealand Handball Federation =

Governing body of handball in New Zealand

New Zealand Handball Federation NZHF
- IOC nation: New Zealand
- Sport: Handball
- Other sports: Beach handball; Wheelchair handball
- Official website: www.handball.org.nz

HISTORY
- Preceding organisations: Handball New Zealand
- Year of formation: 2005; 21 years ago

AFFILIATIONS
- International federation: International Handball Federation (IHF)
- IHF member since: 5 June 2009
- Continental association: Oceania Continent Handball Federation
- National Olympic Committee: New Zealand Olympic Committee
- Other affiliation(s): Commonwealth Handball Association

GOVERNING BODY
- President: David Ireland (New Zealand)

HEADQUARTERS
- Address: Wellington
- Country: New Zealand
- Secretary General: Frank Stoltenberg (New Zealand) (Germany)

The New Zealand Handball Federation (NZHF) is the governing body for the sport of handball and beach handball in New Zealand. NZHF is member of the Oceania Continent Handball Federation (OCHF), International Handball Federation (IHF) and the Commonwealth Handball Association.

Founded in 2005, NZHF is recognised by IHF in 2009.

== National teams ==
- New Zealand men's national handball team
- New Zealand women's national handball team
- New Zealand men's national junior handball team
- New Zealand men's national youth handball team

== Region/Clubs ==
- Auckland
  - Auckland Region Handball
- Taranaki
  - Taranaki HC (Inactive)
- Manawatu
  - Massey University HC (Inactive)
- Wellington
  - Fruit Flies HC (Inactive; see Purple Goannas HC)
  - Hutt Hunters HC (Inactive)
  - Hutt Hawks HC (Inactive)
  - Northern Aguilas HC (Inactive; see Purple Goannas HC)
  - Purple Goannas HC (Merger between Northern Aguilas and Fruit Flies HC)
  - Spartanz HC
  - Vikings HC
  - Victoria University of Wellington HC
- Canterbury
  - Canterbury Quakes HC
  - Canterbury University HC (Inactive)
- Otago
  - Otago University HC
- Queenstown
  - Queenstown HC
- Southland
  - Southland HC

== NZHF Club Championships ==
=== Men competition ===
Year	Location	Final			Small Final		
2012	Wellington	Victoria University HC	n/a	Auckland Pirates HC	Vikings HC	n/a	Hutt Hawks HC
2013	Wellington	Auckland City HC	21:14	Canterbury Braves HC	Hutt Hawks HC	n/a	Auckland Pirates HC
2014	Wellington	Auckland Pirates HC	14:12	Auckland City HC	Victoria University HC	36:26	Vikings HC
2015	Wellington	Victoria University HC	n/a	Vikings HC	Canterbury Braves HC / Hutt Hawks HC	n/a	Spartanz HC
2016	Auckland	Vikings HC	36:34	Victoria University HC	Auckland Pirates HC	30:23	Auckland City HC
2017	Wellington	Northern Aguilas HC	28:16	Canterbury Quakes HC	Vikings HC	38:30	Auckland Pirates HC
2018	Wellington	Northern Aguilas HC	26:16	Auckland Region HC	Canterbury Quakes HC	21:20	Victoria University HC
2019	Wellington	Vikings HC	28:27	Northern Aguilas HC	Otago University HC	35:33	Auckland Region HC
2020	-	Didn't occur due to Pandemic					
2021	-	Didn't occur due to Pandemic					
2022	Wellington	Northern Aguilas HC	23:19	Auckland Region HC			
2023	Wellington	Otago Sheep	29:26	Purple Goannas	Canterbury Quakes HC	25:16	Vikings HC
2024	Wellington	Canterbury Quakes HC	32:31	UTS HC (AUS)	Purple Goannas	33:30	Brisbane HC (AUS)

=== Women competition ===
Year	Location	Final			Small Final		
2012	Wellington	Canterbury Braves HC	n/a	Auckland University HC	Hutt Hawks HC	n/a	Victoria University HC
2013	Wellington	Hutt Hawks HC	n/a	Victoria University HC	Spartanz HC	n/a	Vikings HC
2014	Wellington	Victoria University HC	16:13	Auckland University HC	Spartanz HC	18:5	Vikings HC
2015	Wellington	The Expandables	n/a	Hutt Hawks HC	Victoria University HC	n/a	Spartanz HC
2016	-	Didn't occur					
2017	Wellington	Victoria University HC	17:12	Spartanz HC / Canterbury Quakes HC	Hutt Hunters HC	24:13	Otago University HC
2018	Wellington	Canterbury Quakes HC	21:18	Victoria University HC	Spartanz HC	20:13	Vikings HC
2019	Wellington	Otago University HC	27:23	Auckland Region HC	Hutt Hunters HC Juniors	32:31	Vikings HC
2020	-	Didn't occur due to Pandemic					
2021	-	Didn't occur due to Pandemic					
2022	Wellington						
2023	Wellington	Hunters HC	36:31	Canterbury Quakes HC	Spartanz HC	25:15	VUW Hakawai
2024	Wellington	UTS HC (AUS)	30:26	Victoria University HC	Brisbane HC (AUS)	19:14	Auckland HC

== See also ==
- Oceania Handball Nations Cup
- Oceania Handball Challenge Trophy
- Oceania Youth Handball Championship
