= Xeniya Volnukhina =

Kazakhstani handball player

Personal information
- Nationality: Kazakhstani
- Born: November 17, 1982 (age 43)
- Height: 173 cm (68 in)

Sport
- Sport: Handball

Senior clubs
- Years: Team
- –: Astana HC
National team
- Years: Team
- –: Kazakhstan
Medal record
Asian Games
Bronze medal – third place	2014 Incheon

Xeniya Volnukhina (Russian: Ксения Андреевна Волнухина; born 17 November 1982) is a handball player from Kazakhstan. She has played on the Kazakhstan women's national handball team, and participated at the 2011 World Women's Handball Championship in Brazil.
