= Ornella Palla =

Uruguayan handball player (born 1990)

Personal information
- Nationality: Uruguayan
- Born: 30 March 1990 (age 36)
- Height: 172 cm (68 in)

Sport
- Sport: Handball
- Position: Left back

Senior clubs
- Years: Team
- –: Scuola Italiana
National team
- Years: Team
- –: Uruguay

Ornella Palla (born 30 March 1990) is a team handball player from Uruguay. She has played on the Uruguay women's national handball team, and participated at the 2011 World Women's Handball Championship in Brazil.
