= 2009 Women's Oceania Handball Championship =

Tournament details
- Host country: Australia
- Venue: 1 (in 1 host city)
- Dates: 25–30 May
- Teams: 4 (from 1 confederation)

Final positions
- Champions: Australia (4th title)
- Runners-up: Queensland
- Third place: NZ Handball Federation
- Fourth place: Handball New Zealand

Tournament statistics
- Matches played: 12
- Goals scored: 484 (40.33 per match)

The 2009 Oceania Women's Handball Championship was the fourth edition of the Oceania Handball Nations Cup, which took place in Brisbane, Australia from 25 to 30 May 2009. Australia won the right represent Oceania in the World Cup.

== Standings ==
Team	Pld	W	D	L	GF	GA	GD	Pts
Australia (H)	6	6	0	0	171	83	+88	12
Queensland	6	4	0	2	142	121	+21	8
NZ Handball Federation	6	2	0	4	102	108	−6	4
Handball New Zealand	6	0	0	6	69	172	−103	0

Source: NZHF
(H) Hosts

== Results ==
All times are local (UTC+10).

25 May 2009; 18:00	NZ Handball Federation	12–7	Handball New Zealand	Sleeman Sports Centre, Brisbane; Referees: Latta & Gavrilovic
25 May 2009; 18:00	Odermatt 6	(6–3)	Randall & Ensor 2	Sleeman Sports Centre, Brisbane; Referees: Latta & Gavrilovic
25 May 2009; 18:00	3× (yellow card) 1× (suspension)	Report	3× (yellow card) 1× (suspension)	Sleeman Sports Centre, Brisbane; Referees: Latta & Gavrilovic

25 May 2009; 20:00	Queensland	18–25	Australia
25 May 2009; 20:00		(6–10)

26 May 2009; 18:00	NZ Handball Federation	17–19	Queensland	Sleeman Sports Centre, Brisbane; Referees: Dawson & Gavrilovic
26 May 2009; 18:00	Gmur 6	(7–8)	3 players 4	Sleeman Sports Centre, Brisbane; Referees: Dawson & Gavrilovic
26 May 2009; 18:00	3× (yellow card) 2× (suspension)	Report	4× (yellow card) 4× (suspension) 1× (red card)	Sleeman Sports Centre, Brisbane; Referees: Dawson & Gavrilovic

26 May 2009; 20:00	Handball New Zealand	11–31	Australia
26 May 2009; 20:00		(6–16)

27 May 2009; 18:00	Handball New Zealand	20–32	Queensland
27 May 2009; 18:00		(7–20)

27 May 2009; 18:00	Australia	24–14	NZ Handball Federation	Sleeman Sports Centre, Brisbane; Referees: Dawson & Latta
27 May 2009; 18:00	Brunsberg 6	(13–6)	Odermatt 6	Sleeman Sports Centre, Brisbane; Referees: Dawson & Latta
27 May 2009; 18:00	1× (yellow card) 1× (suspension)	Report	2× (suspension)	Sleeman Sports Centre, Brisbane; Referees: Dawson & Latta

28 May 2009; 15:00	Handball New Zealand	8–26	NZ Handball Federation	Sleeman Sports Centre, Brisbane; Referees: Dawson & Gavrilovic
28 May 2009; 15:00	Randall 3	(4–12)	Odermatt 10	Sleeman Sports Centre, Brisbane; Referees: Dawson & Gavrilovic
28 May 2009; 15:00	3× (yellow card) 7× (suspension) 1× (red card)	Report	3× (yellow card) 4× (suspension) 1× (red card)	Sleeman Sports Centre, Brisbane; Referees: Dawson & Gavrilovic

28 May 2009; 20:00	Queensland	19–24	Australia
28 May 2009; 20:00		(9–13)

29 May 2009; 18:00	Queensland	21–18	NZ Handball Federation	Sleeman Sports Centre, Brisbane; Referees: Dawson & Sanchez
29 May 2009; 18:00	Steinsland 10	(10–8)	Odermatt & Barwick 5	Sleeman Sports Centre, Brisbane; Referees: Dawson & Sanchez
29 May 2009; 18:00	1× (yellow card) 1× (red card)	Report	3× (yellow card) 3× (suspension)	Sleeman Sports Centre, Brisbane; Referees: Dawson & Sanchez

29 May 2009; 20:00	Handball New Zealand	38–6	Australia
29 May 2009; 20:00		(26–3)

30 May 2009; 18:00	Handball New Zealand	17–33	Queensland
30 May 2009; 18:00		(16–8)

30 May 2009; 20:00	Australia	29–15	NZ Handball Federation	Sleeman Sports Centre, Brisbane; Referees: Dawson & Gavrilovic
30 May 2009; 20:00	Brunsberg 9	(13–9)	Gmur 8	Sleeman Sports Centre, Brisbane; Referees: Dawson & Gavrilovic
30 May 2009; 20:00	3× (yellow card) 2× (suspension)	Report	3× (yellow card) 3× (suspension)	Sleeman Sports Centre, Brisbane; Referees: Dawson & Gavrilovic
