= José Correa (boxer) =

Puerto Rican boxer

José Correa González (December 27, 1980 in Río Piedras, Puerto Rico - April 23, 2015 in Reading, Pennsylvania) was a Puerto Rican professional boxer.

== Professional career ==
On March 23, 2007, Correa lost to Edwin Vázquez Galíndez in a fight for the WBA Fedecaribe welterweight title.
