= 2014 Australian National Handball Championship season =

The 2014 Australian National Handball Championship was split into three stages. Stage one was held in Sydney during July for Under 21 & Under 18 titles. Stage two took place in Brisbane during October for the Open titles. Stage three was in Sydney during November for the Under 14 and Under 16 titles.

The Under 18 Boy's was won by Queensland over New South Wales in a three leg tournament as only two teams entered. The Under 21 Women was won by New South Wales over Queensland. Third place was the Australian Capital Territory. The Under 21 Men was won by New South Wales over Australian Capital Territory. Third was Queensland.

In the Men's Open Championship, Queensland defeated Victoria in the final. It was Queensland's first title since 2005. Third place was New South Wales. followed by Australian Capital Territory fourth, South Australia fifth and Western Australia sixth.

In the Women's Open Championship Queensland defended their title, this time over New South Wales. Third was South Australia followed by Victoria fourth, Australian Capital Territory fifth and Western Australia sixth.

The final sector held in Ryde, Sydney was swept by New South Wales winning the Under 14 Boys and Girls and Under 16 Boys and Girls. The only other state participating was Queensland.

== Junior Handball Results ==
=== Under 21 Women ===
==== Final ====
July	New South Wales	23 – 14	Queensland	Sydney

- Third placed team - Australian Capital Territory

=== Under 21 Men ===
==== Final ====
July	New South Wales	28 – 26	Australian Capital Territory	Sydney

- Third placed team - Queensland

=== Under 18 Boys ===
July	Queensland	3 legs 0	New South Wales	Sydney
July		(64 – 45)		Sydney

== Youth Handball Results ==
=== Under 16 Boys ===
8–9 November	New South Wales	2 legs 1	Queensland	Sydney
8–9 November		(74 - 88)		Sydney

=== Under 16 Girls ===
8–9 November	New South Wales	2 legs 1	Queensland	Sydney
8–9 November		(46 - 42)		Sydney

=== Under 14 Boys ===
8–9 November	New South Wales	3 legs 0	Queensland	Sydney
8–9 November		(71 - 54)		Sydney

=== Under 14 Girls ===
8–9 November	New South Wales	2 legs 0 (1 draw)	Queensland	Sydney
8–9 November		(34 - 30)		Sydney

== Open Handball Results ==
=== Men's Handball ===
==== Final ====
12 October	Queensland	32 – 22	Victoria	Brisbane
12 October		(13-9)		Brisbane

==== 3rd place play off ====
12 October	New South Wales	33 – 23	Australian Capital Territory	Brisbane

==== 5th place play off ====
12 October	South Australia	24 – 19	Western Australia	Brisbane

=== Women's Handball ===
==== Final ====
12 October	Queensland	26 – 20	New South Wales	Brisbane
12 October		(12-11)		Brisbane

==== 3rd place play off ====
12 October	South Australia	21 – 16	Victoria	Brisbane

==== 5th place play off ====
12 October	Australian Capital Territory	26 – 11	Western Australia	Brisbane
