= Shiori Kamimachi =

Japanese handball player (born 1981)

Personal information
- Nationality: Japanese
- Born: 21 January 1981 (age 45)
- Height: 1.65 m (5 ft 5 in)

Sport
- Sport: Handball
- Position: Left wing
- Current club: Gjøvik håndballklubb
- Number: 41
National team
Years	Team	Apps	(Gls)
–	Japan	56	(220)

Shiori Kamimachi (上町 史織, Kamimachi Shiori; born 1981) is a Japanese team handball player. She plays on the Japanese national team, and participated at the 2011 World Women's Handball Championship in Brazil.
