= Sally Potocki =

Australian handball player

Personal information
- Nationality: Australian
- Born: 8 February 1989 (age 37) Melbourne, Australia
- Height: 1.78 m (5 ft 10 in)

Sport
- Sport: Handball
- Position: Left back
- Current club: Bayer Leverkusen

Senior clubs
- Years: Team
- 2012: HSG Blomberg-Lippe
- 2012–2016: Borussia Dortmund
- 2016–2019: Bayer Leverkusen
National team
Years	Team	Apps	(Gls)
2013–2019	Australia	41	(253)

Sally Potocki (born 8 February 1989) is an Australian beach handball player and a retired indoor handball player who last played professionally for Bayer Leverkusen in 1. Bundesliga and the Australian national team.

== Handball career ==
=== Club career ===
Potocki played professionally in the German Handball-Bundesliga, from 2012 for the club HSG Blomberg-Lippe, from autumn 2012 for Borussia Dortmund, and later several seasons for the club TSV Bayer 04 Leverkusen.

During her time at BVB Dortmund Potocki captained the team. She was co-captained of Bayer Leverkusen.

=== International ===
Potocki competed for the Australian team at the 2007 World Women's Handball Championship in France.

She participated in the 2013 World Women's Handball Championship in Serbia, where she scored 48 goals and was listed tied third among the top goal scorers, and was awarded player of the game against Germany. She represented and captained Australia at the 2019 IHF world championships in Japan.

In 2018, after a 6 years break from playing for Australia, she returned to the squad for the Asian Championships in Japan where she was the top scorer of the tournament and largely contributed to helping Australia qualify for their first World Championships since 2013. Potocki returned to Japan with the Australian team for the IHF World Championships 2019. She retired from Indoor Handball at the end of the world championships 2019 after receiving the Player of the Game award on Australia's last game against China.

== Basketball ==
Potocki previously played basketball professionally. Between 2007 and 2011, she played for the Sydney Uni Flames of the Australian Women's National Basketball League. Potocki was also part of the Australian squad.

== Beach handball ==
In 2022, Potocki started playing beach handball for Brest Bretagne Handball at the EHF Beach Handball Champions Cup held in Madeira, Portugal. She later represented Australia at the Oceanian Beach Handball Championships 2023. In 2024 Potocki was elected MVP at the Australian Beach Handball Club Championships she later Captained the Australian Beach Handball Team at the IHF World Championship 2024 in China.

== Statistics ==
Year	League	Club	Games played	7m (scored/shot)	Total Goals	Yellow card	2 minutes	Red card
2018–2019	German Premier League (Bundesliga)	Bayer Leverkusen	25	43/50	115	7	9	0
2017–2018	German Premier League (Bundesliga)	Bayer Leverkusen	25 - v. captain	45/53	105	6	8	0
2016–2017	German Premier League (Bundesliga)	Bayer Leverkusen	25	8/12	58	14	11	0
2015–2016	German Premier League (Bundesliga)	BVB Dortmund 09	26 - Captain	1/1	29	12	13	0
2014–2015	German Second League (2. Bundesliga)	BVB Dortmund 09	22 - Captain	20/26	100	7	10	0
2013–2014	German Second League (2. Bundesliga)	BVB Dortmund 09	27	1/1	89	20	12	0
