= Australian National Handball Championship =

The Australian National Handball Championship is a competition run each year by the Australian Handball Federation. It features teams from each state and territory in Australia.

== Champions ==
=== Men's indoor - Aleksandar (Sasha) Dimitric Cup ===
Year	Venue	Final			Third Place Match		
Year	Venue	Winner	Score	Runner-up	3rd Place	Score	4th Place
2005	Sydney	Queensland	unknown	unknown	unknown	unknown	Auckland (NZ)
2006	Shepparton	New South Wales	unknown	Victoria	Queensland	unknown	Western Australia
2007	unknown	unknown	unknown	Australian Capital Territory	unknown	unknown	unknown
2009	Perth	New South Wales	unknown	unknown	unknown	unknown	unknown
2010	Melbourne	New South Wales	17 - 17; 23-20 (ot)	Queensland	South Australia	unknown	unknown
2011	Sydney	New South Wales	unknown	Queensland	Victoria	33:31	Wellington (NZL)
2012	Adelaide	Victoria	16 - 15	New South Wales	Queensland	unknown	South Australia
2013	Adelaide	Victoria	34 - 29	New South Wales	unknown	unknown	unknown
2014	Brisbane	Queensland	32 - 22	Victoria	New South Wales	33 - 23	Australian Capital Territory
2015	Perth	Victoria	24 - 19	Western Australia	New South Wales	28 - 23	South Australia
2016	Sydney	South Australia	26 - 23	New South Wales	Victoria	27 - 24	Western Australia
2017	Sydney	New South Wales	24 - 20	Victoria	Australian Capital Territory	unknown	Queensland
2018	Sydney	Queensland	24 - 22	Victoria	New South Wales	only 3 teams	
2019	Sydney	Victoria	-	New South Wales	Queensland	-	New Caledonia
2022	Melbourne	Victoria	26 - 25	New South Wales	Queensland	29 - 20	South Australia
2023	Melbourne	Victoria	41 - 18	South Australia	Australian Capital Territory	37 - 21	New South Wales
2025	Sydney	Queensland	36 - 30	Australian Capital Territory	New South Wales	34 - 32	NZ Barbarians
2026	Sydney	New South Wales	27 - 22	Australian Capital Territory	Queensland	32 - 18	New South Wales 2

=== Women's indoor ===
Year	Venue	Final			Third Place Match		
Year	Venue	Winner	Score	Runner-up	3rd Place	Score	4th Place
2006	Shepparton	New South Wales	unknown	unknown	unknown	unknown	unknown
2009	Perth	unknown	unknown	New South Wales	unknown	unknown	unknown
2010	Melbourne	Queensland	22 - 20	New South Wales	unknown	unknown	unknown
2011	Sydney	New South Wales	unknown	unknown	unknown	unknown	unknown
2012	Adelaide	Victoria	23 - 20	Queensland	New South Wales	unknown	South Australia
2013	Adelaide	Queensland	unknown	Australian Capital Territory	New South Wales	unknown	Victoria
2014	Brisbane	Queensland	26 - 20	New South Wales	South Australia	21 - 16	Victoria
2015	Perth	Victoria	unknown	South Aust./QLD	Western Australia	27 - 23	New South Wales
2016	Sydney	Victoria	19 - 18	Queensland	South Aust.	28 - 23	New South Wales
2017	Sydney	Queensland	24 - 20	Victoria	New Zealand	22 - 20	Western Australia
2018	Sydney	New Caledonia	26 - 25	Victoria	Queensland	18 - 16	Australian Capital Territory
2019	Sydney	New South Wales	-	Victoria / Queensland	Only 2 teams		
2022	Melbourne	Queensland	22 - 21	Victoria	New South Wales	only 3 teams	
2023	Melbourne	Queensland	22 - 20	Victoria	New South Wales	only 3 teams	
2025	Sydney	New South Wales	23 - 20	Queensland	Australian Capital Territory	26 - 25	Western Australia
2026	Sydney	New South Wales	33 - 24	Queensland	Victoria	28 - 11	Australian Capital Territory

=== Men's Under 21 indoor ===
Year	Venue	Final			Third Place Match		
Year	Venue	Winner	Score	Runner-up	3rd Place	Score	4th Place
1992	unknown	New South Wales	unknown	unknown	unknown	unknown	unknown
2006	unknown	New South Wales	unknown	unknown	unknown	unknown	unknown
2007	unknown	New South Wales	unknown	unknown	unknown	unknown	unknown
2008	unknown	New South Wales	unknown	unknown	unknown	unknown	unknown
2009	Brisbane	New South Wales	unknown	unknown	unknown	unknown	unknown
2010	Canberra	New South Wales	unknown	Australian Capital Territory	unknown	unknown	unknown
2011	Brisbane	New South Wales	unknown	unknown	unknown	unknown	unknown
2013	Brisbane	New South Wales	unknown	Queensland	only two teams		
2014	Sydney	New South Wales	28 - 26	Australian Capital Territory	Queensland	only three teams	
2015	Brisbane	Queensland U21	18 - 14	New South Wales	Queensland U18	only three teams	
2016	Gold Coast	Queensland	26 - 23	Wellington (NZ)	New South Wales	only three teams	
2017	Sydney	Queensland	unknown	New South Wales	only two teams		
2018	Gold Coast	Queensland	33 - 20	New South Wales	only two teams		
2022	Gold Coast	Queensland	67 - 67; 2 legs 1	New South Wales	only two teams		

=== Women's Under 21 indoor ===
Year	Venue	Final			Third Place Match		
Year	Venue	Winner	Score	Runner-up	3rd Place	Score	4th Place
2009	Brisbane	New South Wales	unknown	unknown	unknown	unknown	unknown
2010	Canberra	New South Wales	unknown	unknown	unknown	unknown	unknown
2011	Brisbane	New South Wales	unknown	unknown	unknown	unknown	unknown
2013	Brisbane	Queensland	unknown	New South Wales	only two teams		
2014	Sydney	New South Wales	23 - 14	Queensland	Australian Capital Territory	only three teams	
2015	Brisbane	New Zealand	unknown	Queensland	Australian Capital Territory	only three teams	
2016	Gold Coast	Queensland	17 - 8	Australian Capital Territory	New South Wales	only three teams	
2017	Sydney	New South Wales	unknown	Queensland	only two teams		
2018	Gold Coast	New South Wales	20 - 19	Queensland	only two teams		
2022	Gold Coast	Queensland	53 - 51 (3 legs)	New South Wales	only two teams		

=== Boy's Under 18 indoor ===
Year	Venue	Final			Third Place Match		
Year	Venue	Winner	Score	Runner-up	3rd Place	Score	4th Place
1988	Sydney	New South Wales	29 - 21	Australian Capital Territory	Only two teams		
2009	Brisbane	New South Wales	unknown	unknown	unknown	unknown	unknown
2010	Canberra	New South Wales	unknown	unknown	unknown	unknown	unknown
2011	Brisbane	New South Wales	unknown	unknown	unknown	unknown	unknown
2013	Brisbane	Queensland	unknown	New South Wales	only two teams		
2014	Sydney	Queensland	64 - 45 (3 legs)	New South Wales	Only two teams		
2015	Brisbane	Queensland	Other entered teams did not show. They played in the Under 21 tournament				
2016	Gold Coast	New South Wales	28 - 17	Wellington (NZ)	Queensland	only three teams	
2017	Sydney	Queensland	unknown	New South Wales	only two teams		
2018	Gold Coast	New South Wales	28 - 20	Queensland	only two teams		
2022	Gold Coast	Queensland	85 - 64 (3 legs)	New South Wales	only two teams		

=== Girls Under 18 indoor ===
Year	Venue	Final			Third Place Match		
Year	Venue	Winner	Score	Runner-up	3rd Place	Score	4th Place
2009	Brisbane	New South Wales	unknown	unknown	unknown	unknown	unknown
2010	Canberra	New South Wales B	unknown	New South Wales A	unknown	unknown	unknown
2011	Brisbane	Australian Capital Territory	unknown	unknown	unknown	unknown	unknown
2013	Brisbane	Queensland	unknown	New South Wales	only two teams		
2014	No titles contested						
2015	Brisbane	Queensland	1 leg all goal diff.	Australian Capital Territory	only two teams		
2016	Gold Coast	Wellington (NZ)	27 - 15	New South Wales	only two teams		
2017	Sydney	New South Wales	unknown	Queensland	only two teams		
2018	Gold Coast	New South Wales	21 - 12	Queensland	only two teams		

=== Boy's Under 16 indoor ===
Year	Venue	Final			Third Place Match		
Year	Venue	Winner	Score	Runner-up	3rd Place	Score	4th Place
2009	Brisbane	New South Wales	unknown	unknown	unknown	unknown	unknown
2010	Canberra	New South Wales	unknown	Australian Capital Territory	Queensland	Only three teams	
2011	Canberra	New South Wales	21 - 14	Queensland	Australian Capital Territory	Only three teams	
2013	unknown	Queensland	unknown	unknown	unknown	unknown	unknown
2014	Sydney	New South Wales	2 legs 1	Queensland	Only two teams		
2015	Canberra	Queensland	3 legs 0	New South Wales	Only two teams		
2016-18	No titles contested						

=== Girls Under 16 indoor ===
Year	Venue	Final			Third Place Match		
Year	Venue	Winner	Score	Runner-up	3rd Place	Score	4th Place
2009	Brisbane	New South Wales	unknown	unknown	unknown	unknown	unknown
2010	Canberra	New South Wales	unknown	Queensland	Australian Capital Territory	Only three teams	
2011	Canberra	Queensland	21 - 14	New South Wales	Australian Capital Territory	Only three teams	
2014	Sydney	New South Wales	2 legs 1	Queensland	Only two teams		
2015	Canberra	New South Wales	13 - 12	Australian Capital Territory A	Queensland	Round Robin	Australian Capital Territory B
2016-18	No titles contested						

=== Boy's Under 14 indoor ===
Year	Venue	Final			Third Place Match		
Year	Venue	Winner	Score	Runner-up	3rd Place	Score	4th Place
2010	Coffs Harbour	New South Wales	3 legs 0	Queensland	Only two teams		
2011	Canberra	Australian Capital Territory	unknown	Queensland	New South Wales	Only three teams	
2013	unknown	Queensland	unknown	unknown	unknown	unknown	unknown
2014	Sydney	New South Wales	3 legs 0	Queensland	Only two teams		
2015	Canberra	No titles held					
2016-19	No titles contested						

=== Girls Under 14 indoor ===
Year	Venue	Final			Third Place Match		
Year	Venue	Winner	Score	Runner-up	3rd Place	Score	4th Place
2010	Coffs Harbour	New South Wales	2 legs 1	Queensland	Only two teams		
2011	Canberra	No titles held					
2014	Sydney	New South Wales	2 legs 0	Queensland	Only two teams		
2015	Canberra	No titles held					
2016-19	No titles contested						

=== Australian University Championship ===
==== Men ====
Year	Gold	Silver	Bronze	4th place
2007	Griffith University	The University of New South Wales	The University of Sydney	University of South Australia
2008	Macquarie University	Royal Melbourne Institute of Technology	Victoria University	The University of Melbourne
2009	Bond University	Macquarie University	Victoria University	The University of Sydney
2010	Curtin University	The University of Western Australia	Monash University	Edith Cowan University

==== Mixed Division 1 ====
Year	Gold	Silver	Bronze	4th place
2011	The University of Sydney	The University of Western Australia	Edith Cowan University	University of New South Wales
2012	University of Technology Sydney	The University of Sydney	Monash University	University of Ballarat
2013	University of Technology Sydney	University of Queensland	University of Western Australia	The University of Sydney
2014	The University of Sydney	Deakin University	University of Western Australia	University of Technology Sydney
2015	University of Technology Sydney	Deakin University	Australian College of Physical Education	The University of Sydney
2016	Deakin University	Queensland University of Technology	The University of Sydney	University of Adelaide
2017	Griffith University	University of Canberra	Queensland University of Technology	University of Western Sydney
2018	University of Queensland	University of Technology Sydney	Queensland University of Technology	Australian College of Physical Education
2019	University of Queensland	University of Technology Sydney	University of New South Wales	University of the Sunshine Coast

==== Mixed Division 2 ====
Year	Gold	Silver	Bronze	4th place
2011	University of Technology Sydney	Bond University	University of Queensland	Deakin University
2012	Victoria University	University of Wollongong	Griffith University	University of Newcastle
2013	Deakin University	Griffith University	Australian College of Physical Education	Queensland University of Technology
2014	Australian College of Physical Education	University of Adelaide	Queensland University of Technology	Griffith University
2015	Queensland University of Technology	University of Canberra	Griffith University	RMIT University
2016	Griffith University	University of Canberra	Flinders University	University of Wollongong

See main article - Australian University Games

=== Australian Schools Championship ===
==== Boy's indoor ====
Year	Venue	Final		
Year	Venue	Winner	Score	Runner-up
1988	Sydney	Barker College (NSW)	21 - 19	North Sydney Boys High School (NSW)
2016	Canberra	Turramurra High School (NSW)	25 - 19	Narrabundah College (ACT)

==== Girl's indoor ====
Year	Venue	Final		
Year	Venue	Winner	Score	Runner-up
2016	Canberra	Turramurra High School (NSW)	9 - 8	Narrabundah College (ACT)

== See also ==
- Australian Handball Federation
- Handball League Australia
