= Ginásio José Corrêa =

Indoor sporting arena in São Paulo, Brazil

- Interactive map of Ginásio José Corrêa
- Full name: Ginásio Poliesportivo José Corrêa
- Location: Barueri, SP, Brazil
- Coordinates: 23°30′26″S 46°52′03″W
- Owner: Prefeitura de Barueri
- Capacity: 5,000

Ginásio Poliesportivo José Corrêa is an indoor sporting arena that is located in Barueri, São Paulo, Brazil. The capacity of the arena is 5,000 people for basketball and volleyball games.

== History ==
The arena was used for some of the preliminary games of the 2006 FIBA World Championship for Women. In December 2011, it was one of the venues of the World Women's Handball Championship. The arena also hosted the 2013 edition of the Intercontinental Basketball Cup. The arena has hosted two UFC events, UFC Fight Night: Maia vs. Shields on October 9, 2013, and UFC Fight Night: Machida vs. Dollaway on December 20, 2014. In May 2018, it hosted the 3 games of the preliminary round of the inaugural edition of the FIVB Volleyball Women's Nations League.

| Preceded by Newell's Old Boys; Rosario / O.A.C.A. Indoor Hall; Maroussi, Athens | FIBA Intercontinental Cup; Final Venue; 2013 | Succeeded by HSBC Arena; Rio de Janeiro |
