= 2015 Australian National Handball Championship season =

The 2015 Australian National Handball Championship is split into three stages. Stage one was held in Brisbane early August for Under 21 & Under 18 titles. Stage two in Canberra mid August for the Youth Championships. Stage three will be in Perth during October for the Open titles.

The Under 18 Boy's was won by Queensland as no other teams turned up. They ended up playing in the Under 21 men's competition which was won by Queensland Under 21 over New South Wales with the Queensland Under 18's third. The Under 18's women saw Queensland beat the Australian Capital Territory on goal difference after they were locked at one win each and two draw's.

The Under 16 Boy's was won easily by Queensland three legs to zero over New South Wales. In the Under 16 Girl's, New South Wales won a tense final against Australian Capital Territory A. Queensland came third with Australian Capital Territory B fourth.

The senior nationals took place in Perth, Western Australia. Victoria defeated hosts Western Australia in the men's Gold Medal match with New South Wales taking the bronze. Current champions Queensland did not compete. In the women's, Victoria defeated a combined Queensland and South Australian team in the gold medal match. In the bronze medal match, hosts Western Australia defeated New South Wales.

== Senior Nationals ==
=== Men ===
Team	Pld	W	D	L	GF	GA	GD	Pts
Victoria	3	3	0	0	96	66	+30	6
Western Australia	3	2	0	1	65	59	+6	4
New South Wales	3	1	0	2	59	78	−19	2
South Australia	3	0	0	3	57	74	−17	0

==== Final ====
11 October 2015; 13:00	Victoria	unknown	Western Australia	Perth

==== Bronze playoff ====
11 October 2015; 10:00	New South Wales	28 - 23	South Australia	Perth

=== Women ===
Team	Pld	W	D	L	GF	GA	GD	Pts
Victoria	3	3	0	0	70	40	+30	6
SA/QLD	3	2	0	1	56	54	+2	4
Western Australia	3	1	0	2	47	62	−15	2
New South Wales	3	0	0	3	48	65	−17	0

==== Final ====
11 October 2015; 11:30	Victoria	12 - 10	South Australia/Queensland	Perth

==== Bronze playoff ====
11 October 2015; 08:30	Western Australia	27 - 23	New South Wales	Perth

== Junior Indoor Results ==
=== Under 21 Women ===
==== Final ====
2 August 2015	New Zealand	11 – 10	Queensland	Brisbane

- Third placed team - Australian Capital Territory

=== Under 21 Men ===
==== Final ====
2 August 2015	Queensland Under 21	28 – 26	New South Wales	Brisbane

- Third placed team - Queensland Under 18's

=== Under 18 Girls ===
August, 2015	Queensland	1 leg all goal diff.	Australian Capital Territory	Brisbane

== Youth Championship ==
=== Under 16 Boy's ===
August, 2015	Queensland	3 legs 0	New South Wales	Canberra

=== Under 16 Girls ===
==== Final ====
August, 2015	New South Wales	13 - 12	Australian Capital Territory A	Canberra
August, 2015		(5-6)		Canberra

- Third placed team - Queensland
- Fourth placed team - Australian Capital Territory B
