= Sports Tribunal of New Zealand =

The Sports Tribunal of New Zealand, originally the Sports Disputes Tribunal of New Zealand, is an independent arbitration body that rules on certain types of sports disputes.

The Sports Tribunal of New Zealand was set up in 2003 by Sport and Recreation New Zealand (SPARC; since renamed to Sport New Zealand). The governing legislation is the Sport and Recreation New Zealand Act 2002 and section 8(i) was the genesis of the tribunal, with the legislation as originally enacted stating:

The functions of the Agency are to facilitate the resolution of disputes between persons or organisations involved in physical recreation and sport.

The Fifth Labour Government passed the Sports Anti-Doping Act 2006, which came into effect on 1 July 2007. At the time, Trevor Mallard was the Minister for Sports. Since then, the scope of the tribunal is three-fold:

- doping matters
- appeals against national sports organisations or the New Zealand Olympic Committee (NZOC) with regards to selection to a New Zealand team
- any other sports-related disputes when all parties agree to be bound by the tribunal's ruling

The current members of the tribunal are:

- John Macdonald (chairperson), a former district court judge and New Zealand representative in basketball
- Warwick Smith (deputy chairperson), a barrister and a former member of the Copyright Tribunal
- Ruth Aitken, former netball player and coach
- Paula Tesoriero, former Paralympic racing cyclist
- Helen Tobin, orthopaedic surgeon
- Pippa Hayward, former New Zealand representative field hockey player

== See also ==
- National Sports Tribunal, the Australian equivalent body
