= Australia women's national handball team =

Australia

Information
- Association: Australian Handball Federation
- Coach: Heba Aly
- Assistant coach: Kamel Badr; Amgad Teleb
- Captain: Sally Potocki

Colours
1st	2nd

Results

Summer Olympics
- Appearances: 1 (First in 2000)
- Best result: 10th (2000)

World Championship
- Appearances: 8 (First in 1999)
- Best result: 23rd (1999, 2003)

Oceania Nations Cup
- Appearances: 7 (First in 1997)
- Best result: 1st (1997, 2005, 2007, 2009, 2011, 2013, 2016)
- Last updated on Unknown.

The Australia women's national handball team is the national handball team of Australia. It is governed by the Australian Handball Federation, and takes part in international handball competitions.

== Tournaments ==
=== Olympic Games ===
Year	Round	Position	GP	W	D	L	GS	GA	GD
(Australia) 2000	1st Round	10th	5	0	0	5	77	163	−86
Total	1/11	0 Titles	5	0	0	5	77	163	−86

=== World Championship ===
Year	Round	Rank	M	W	D	L	GF	GA	GD
(Denmark) / (Norway) 1999	1st round	23rd	5	0	0	5	75	166	−91
(Italy) 2001	did not qualify								
(Croatia) 2003	1st round	23rd	5	0	0	5	74	178	−104
(Russia) 2005	1st round	24th	5	0	0	5	58	236	−182
(France) 2007	1st round	24th	6	0	0	6	66	179	−113
(China) 2009	1st round	24th	8	0	0	8	128	373	−245
(Brazil) 2011	1st round	24th	7	0	0	7	75	294	−219
(Serbia) 2013	1st round	24th	7	0	0	7	115	215	−100
(Denmark) 2015	did not qualify								
(Germany) 2017	did not qualify								
(Japan) 2019	1st round	24th	7	0	0	7	93	260	−163
(Spain) 2021	did not qualify								
(Denmark) / (Norway) / (Sweden) 2023	did not qualify								
(Germany) / (Netherlands) 2025	did not qualify								
(Hungary) 2027	to be determined								
(Spain) 2029	to be determined								
(Czech Republic) / (Poland) 2031	to be determined								
Total	8/30	0 Titles	50	0	0	50	684	1901	−1213

=== Asian Championship ===
Year	Round	Position	GP	W	D	L	GS	GA	GD
(Japan) 2018	Fifth place game	5th	6	4	0	2	160	156	+4
(Jordan) 2021	did not compete								
(South Korea) 2022	Ninth place game	10th	5	0	0	5	106	197	−91
(India) 2024	did not compete								
(Kazakhstan) 2026	qualified								
Total	3/21	0 Titles	11	4	0	7	266	353	−87

=== Oceania Nations Cup ===
Year	Round	Position	GP	W	D	L	GS	GA	GD
(Australia) 1997	Final	1st	2	2	0	0	48	22	26
(Australia) 2005	Final	1st	2	2	0	0	69	29	40
(Australia) 2007	Final	1st	2	2	0	0	63	29	34
(Australia) 2009	Final	1st	6	6	0	0	171	83	88
(New Zealand) 2011	Final	1st	2	2	0	0	47	28	19
(New Zealand) 2013	Final	1st	2	2	0	0	50	35	15
(Australia) 2016	Final	1st	2	2	0	0	57	21	26
Total	7/7	7 Titles	16	16	0	0	460	247	203

== Current squad ==
Squad for the 2019 World Women's Handball Championship.

Head coach: Heba Aly

No.	Pos.	Name	Date of birth (age)	Height	App.	Goals	Club
1	GK	Jemima Harbort	4 September 1987 (age 39)	1.80 m	47	1	(Australia) Queensland HC
5	LB	Jessica Fallah	10 July 1999 (age 27)	1.70 m	11	13	(Australia) UTS Handball Club
7	P	Ana Meded	19 March 1996 (age 30)	1.77 m	25	28	(Australia) Melbourne Handball Club
8	CB	Sally Potocki	11 February 1989 (age 37)	1.78 m	32	157	(Germany) Bayer Leverkusen
11	CB	Emma Guignard	2 May 1989 (age 37)	1.65 m	31	46	(Australia) Harbourside HC
12	P	Laura Player	25 July 1991 (age 35)	1.75 m	15	10	(Australia) Harbourside HC
13	GK	Manon Vernay	7 January 1989 (age 37)	1.74 m	17	0	(Germany) HSV Solingen-Gräfrath
14	CB	Madeleine McAfee	5 February 1993 (age 33)	1.70 m	48	175	(Australia) UTS Handball Club
16	P	Rosalie Boyd	21 October 1987 (age 39)	1.78 m	55	37	(Australia) Queensland HC
17	LW	Jessie Wood	17 March 1997 (age 29)	1.55 m	13	10	(Australia) UTS Handball Club
19	GK	Amy Thomas	2 September 2000 (age 26)	1.76 m	12	0	(Australia) UTS-UC Hawks
21	LB	Manon Livingstone	28 January 1997 (age 29)	1.63 m	12	6	(France) Pays de Grasse Handball ASPTT
22	LW	Heather Cooper	9 May 1995 (age 31)	1.67 m	18	23	(Australia) Queensland HC
25	RB	Olivia Mowat	2 May 1994 (age 32)	1.68 m	14	6	(Australia) UTS Handball Club
27	RW	Theresa Fitzgerald	6 August 1995 (age 31)	1.65 m	4	0	(Australia) Melbourne Handball Club
30	RW	Brianna Keyes	30 September 1993 (age 33)	1.63 m	14	11	(Australia) UTS Handball Club
